= UCI Mountain Bike World Cup =

Annual mountain bike racing series

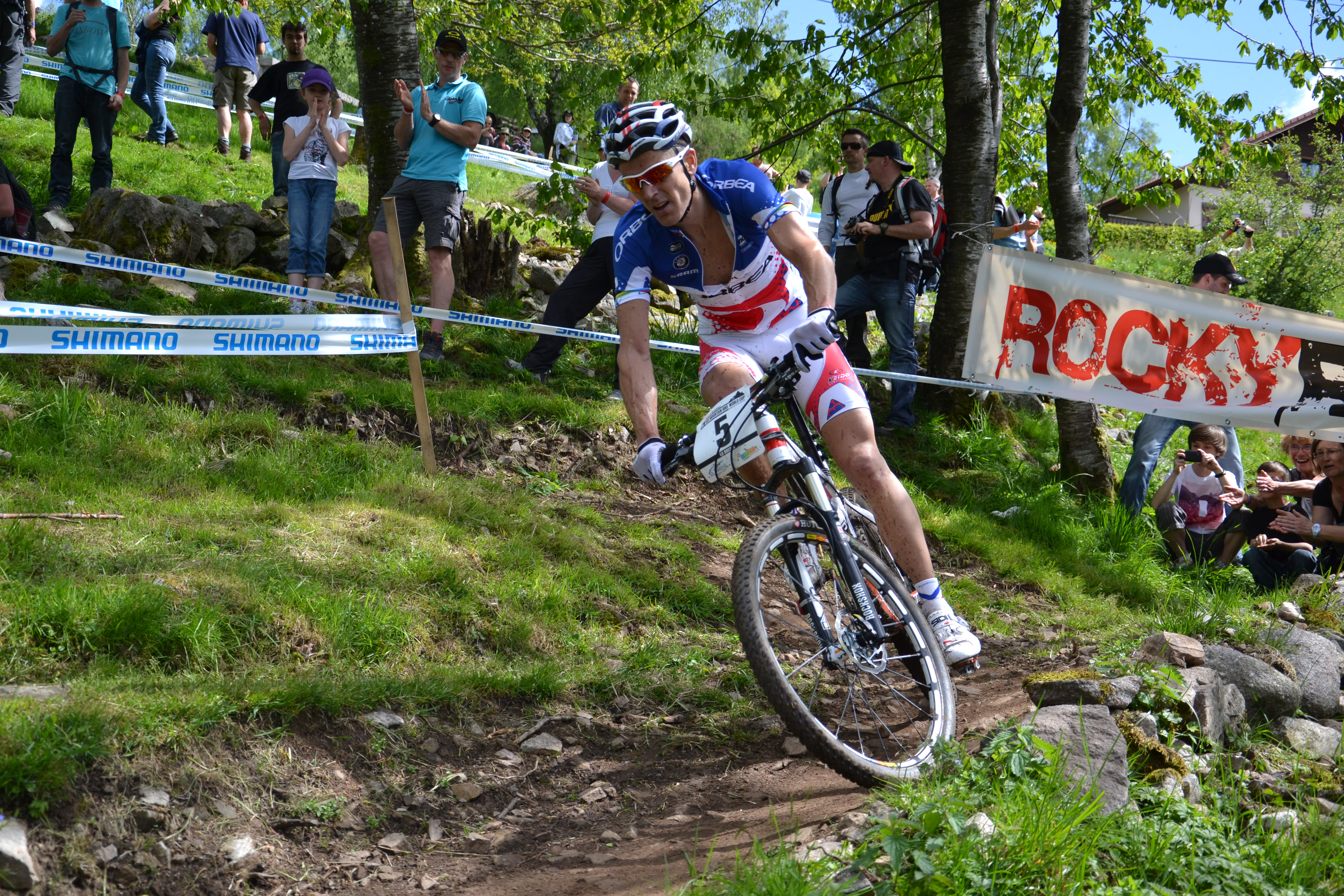
- Frenchman Julien Absalon is a seven-time winner of the overall cross-country series.
- Status: active
- Genre: sports event
- Date: midyear
- Frequency: annual
- Inaugurated: 1991
- Organiser: UCI

The UCI Mountain Bike World Cup is a multi-round mountain bike racing series that is sanctioned by the Union Cycliste Internationale. The reigning series leaders in each class are identified by a special jersey.

== History ==
The first World Cup series – which was composed of cross-country events – was held in 1989. The Downhill World Cup was inaugurated two years later, and the Dual Slalom World Cup was launched in 1998. The dual-slalom format – which involved knock-out heats with two riders on the parallel courses in each heat – evolved into four-cross (with four riders on a single course per heat) in 2002 before being dropped after the 2011 season. Riders win points according to their placing in each event. In 2023, enduro was added to the UCI World Cup series. UCI Mountain Bike E-Enduro World Cup races have been held since June 2023. In 2023, Enduro World Series (EWS) was renamed to UCI Mountain Bike Enduro World Cup (EDR), EWS events are renamed to EDR World Cups.

The replacement world series for 4X World Cup is the 4X Pro Tour and for XCM World Cup is UCI MTB Marathon series.

== Overall series winners ==
=== Cross-country (XCO) ===
==== Men ====
Season	Winner	Runner-up	Third
1990	(United States) Ned Overend	(Switzerland) Thomas Frischknecht	(United Kingdom) Tim Gould
1991	(United States) John Tomac	(Austria) Gerhard Zadrobilek	(United States) David Wiens
1992	(Switzerland) Thomas Frischknecht	(United States) John Tomac	(United States) Ned Overend
1993	(Switzerland) Thomas Frischknecht	(United States) John Tomac	(Slovakia) Peter Hric
1994	(Netherlands) Bart Brentjens	(United States) Ned Overend	(United States) Tinker Juarez
1995	(Switzerland) Thomas Frischknecht	(Norway) Rune Hoydahl	(Denmark) Jan Erik Østergaard
1996	(France) Christophe Dupouey	(Switzerland) Thomas Frischknecht	(France) Miguel Martinez
1997	(France) Miguel Martinez	(France) Christophe Dupouey	(Australia) Cadel Evans
1998	(Australia) Cadel Evans	(France) Miguel Martinez	(Norway) Rune Hoydahl
1999	(Australia) Cadel Evans	(France) Miguel Martinez	(Switzerland) Christoph Sauser
2000	(France) Miguel Martinez	(Netherlands) Bas van Dooren	(France) Christophe Dupouey
2001	(Canada) Roland Green	(Spain) José Antonio Hermida	(France) Miguel Martinez
2002	(Belgium) Filip Meirhaeghe	(Switzerland) Christoph Sauser	(Switzerland) Thomas Frischknecht
2003	(France) Julien Absalon	(Switzerland) Christoph Sauser	(Belgium) Filip Meirhaeghe
2004	(Switzerland) Christoph Sauser	(Belgium) Roel Paulissen	(Belgium) Filip Meirhaeghe
2005	(Switzerland) Christoph Sauser	(Spain) José Antonio Hermida	(France) Julien Absalon
2006	(France) Julien Absalon	(Switzerland) Christoph Sauser	(Spain) José Antonio Hermida
2007	(France) Julien Absalon	(Spain) José Antonio Hermida	(Switzerland) Christoph Sauser
2008	(France) Julien Absalon	(Switzerland) Christoph Sauser	(Spain) José Antonio Hermida
2009	(France) Julien Absalon	(Spain) José Antonio Hermida	(South Africa) Burry Stander
2010	(Switzerland) Nino Schurter	(France) Julien Absalon	(Czech Republic) Jaroslav Kulhavý
2011	(Czech Republic) Jaroslav Kulhavý	(Switzerland) Nino Schurter	(France) Julien Absalon
2012	(Switzerland) Nino Schurter	(South Africa) Burry Stander	(Czech Republic) Jaroslav Kulhavý
2013	(Switzerland) Nino Schurter	(Australia) Daniel McConnell	(France) Julien Absalon
2014	(France) Julien Absalon	(Switzerland) Nino Schurter	(Australia) Daniel McConnell
2015	(Switzerland) Nino Schurter	(France) Julien Absalon	(Czech Republic) Jaroslav Kulhavý
2016	(France) Julien Absalon	(Switzerland) Nino Schurter	(France) Maxime Marotte
2017	(Switzerland) Nino Schurter	(France) Stephane Tempier	(France) Maxime Marotte
2018	(Switzerland) Nino Schurter	(Netherlands) Mathieu van der Poel	(France) Maxime Marotte
2019	(Switzerland) Nino Schurter	(Netherlands) Mathieu van der Poel	(Brazil) Henrique Avancini
2020	UCI decided to not award World Cup standings points as just two races were run.		
2021	(Switzerland) Mathias Flückiger	(France) Victor Koretzky	(Czech Republic) Ondřej Cink
2022	(Switzerland) Nino Schurter	(France) Titouan Carod	(Italy) Luca Braidot
2023	(Switzerland) Nino Schurter	(France) Jordan Sarrou	(Switzerland) Mathias Flückiger
2024	(South Africa) Alan Hatherly	(France) Victor Koretzky	(Switzerland) Filippo Colombo
2025	(United States) Christopher Blevins	(Chile) Martín Vidaurre	(France) Luca Martin
2026	(France) Luca Martin	(France) Adrien Boichis	(Chile) Martín Vidaurre

- Medals:

Rank	Nation	Gold	Silver	Bronze	Total
1	Switzerland	15	8	4	27
2	France	10	10	9	29
3	United States	3	3	3	9
4	Australia	2	1	2	5
5	Netherlands	1	3	0	4
6	Belgium	1	1	2	4
7	South Africa	1	1	1	3
8	Czech Republic	1	0	3	4
9	Canada	1	0	0	1
10	Spain	0	4	2	6
11	Norway	0	1	1	2
12	Austria	0	1	0	1
13	Brazil	0	0	1	1
13	Chile	0	0	1	1
13	Denmark	0	0	1	1
13	Great Britain	0	0	1	1
13	Italy	0	0	1	1
13	Slovakia	0	0	1	1
Totals (18 entries)		35	33	33	101

==== Women ====
Season	Winner	Runner-up	Third
1991	(United States) Sara Ballantyne	(United States) Juli Furtado	(Germany) Regina Stiefl
1992	(United States) Ruthie Matthes	(United States) Juli Furtado	(Switzerland) Chantal Daucourt
1993	(United States) Juli Furtado	(United States) Ruthie Matthes	(Canada) Alison Sydor
1994	(United States) Juli Furtado	(United Kingdom) Caroline Alexander	(Canada) Alison Sydor
1995	(United States) Juli Furtado	(Canada) Alison Sydor	(Italy) Paola Pezzo
1996	(Canada) Alison Sydor	(Norway) Gunn-Rita Dahle	(United States) Juli Furtado
1997	(Italy) Paola Pezzo	(Canada) Alison Sydor	(Switzerland) Chantal Daucourt
1998	(Canada) Alison Sydor	(France) Laurence Leboucher	(Italy) Paola Pezzo
1999	(Canada) Alison Sydor	(Norway) Gunn-Rita Dahle	(Italy) Annabella Stropparo
2000	(Switzerland) Barbara Blatter	(United States) Alison Dunlap	(Canada) Alison Sydor
2001	(Switzerland) Barbara Blatter	(United Kingdom) Caroline Alexander	(Spain) Margarita Fullana
2002	(United States) Alison Dunlap	(Germany) Sabine Spitz	(Spain) Margarita Fullana
2003	(Norway) Gunn-Rita Dahle	(Germany) Sabine Spitz	(Russia) Irina Kalentieva
2004	(Norway) Gunn-Rita Dahle	(Canada) Marie-Hélène Prémont	(Italy) Annabella Stropparo
2005	(Norway) Gunn-Rita Dahle	(Germany) Sabine Spitz	(Canada) Marie-Hélène Prémont
2006	(Norway) Gunn-Rita Dahle	(Canada) Marie-Hélène Prémont	(Germany) Sabine Spitz
2007	(Russia) Irina Kalentieva	(Canada) Marie-Hélène Prémont	(China) Ren Chengyuan
2008	(Canada) Marie-Hélène Prémont	(Canada) Catharine Pendrel	(Spain) Margarita Fullana
2009	(Austria) Elisabeth Osl	(Norway) Lene Byberg	(Canada) Catharine Pendrel
2010	(Canada) Catharine Pendrel	(United States) Willow Koerber	(Italy) Eva Lechner
2011	(France) Julie Bresset	(Canada) Catharine Pendrel	(Russia) Irina Kalentieva
2012	(Canada) Catharine Pendrel	(Norway) Gunn-Rita Dahle Flesjå	(Czech Republic) Kateřina Nash
2013	(Slovenia) Tanja Žakelj	(Italy) Eva Lechner	(Czech Republic) Kateřina Nash
2014	(Switzerland) Jolanda Neff	(Canada) Catharine Pendrel	(Slovenia) Tanja Žakelj
2015	(Switzerland) Jolanda Neff	(Norway) Gunn-Rita Dahle Flesjå	(United States) Lea Davison
2016	(Canada) Catharine Pendrel	(Denmark) Annika Langvad	(Canada) Emily Batty
2017	(Ukraine) Yana Belomoyna	(Poland) Maja Włoszczowska	(Denmark) Annika Langvad
2018	(Switzerland) Jolanda Neff	(Denmark) Annika Langvad	(Canada) Emily Batty
2019	(United States) Kate Courtney	(Switzerland) Jolanda Neff	(France) Pauline Ferrand-Prévot
2020	UCI decided to not award World Cup standings points as just two races were run.		
2021	(France) Loana Lecomte	(United Kingdom) Evie Richards	(Sweden) Jenny Rissveds
2022	(Switzerland) Alessandra Keller	(Australia) Rebecca McConnell	(Netherlands) Anne Terpstra
2023	(Netherlands) Puck Pieterse	(France) Loana Lecomte	(Austria) Mona Mitterwallner
2024	(Switzerland) Alessandra Keller	(Austria) Laura Stigger	(South Africa) Candice Lill
2025	(New Zealand) Sammie Maxwell	(Sweden) Jenny Rissveds	(Switzerland) Alessandra Keller
2026	(Sweden) Jenny Rissveds	(Switzerland) Sina Frei	(Italy) Martina Berta

- Medals:

Rank	Nation	Gold	Silver	Bronze	Total
1	Canada	7	8	7	22
2	United States	7	5	2	14
3	Switzerland	7	2	3	12
4	Norway	4	5	0	9
5	France	2	1	1	4
6	Italy	1	1	6	8
7	Sweden	1	1	1	3
8	Austria	1	1	0	2
9	Russia	1	0	2	3
10	Netherlands	1	0	1	2
10	Slovenia	1	0	1	2
12	New Zealand	1	0	0	1
12	Ukraine	1	0	0	1
14	Germany	0	3	2	5
15	Denmark	0	3	1	4
16	Great Britain	0	2	0	2
17	Australia	0	1	0	1
17	Poland	0	1	0	1
19	Spain	0	0	3	3
20	Czech Republic	0	0	2	2
21	China	0	0	1	1
21	South Africa	0	0	1	1
Totals (22 entries)		35	34	34	103

=== Short Track (XCC) ===
==== Men ====
Year	1st	2nd	3rd
2022	(South Africa) Alan Hatherly	(Switzerland) Filippo Colombo	(France) Titouan Carod
2023	(Germany) Luca Schwarzbauer	(France) Jordan Sarrou	(France) Joshua Dubau
2024	(France) Victor Koretzky	(South Africa) Alan Hatherly	(Germany) Luca Schwarzbauer
2025	(United States) Christopher Blevins	(France) Luca Martin	(United Kingdom) Charlie Aldridge
2026	(France) Luca Martin	(France) Adrian Boichis	(France) Mathis Azzaro

==== Women ====
Year	1st	2nd	3rd
2022	(Switzerland) Alessandra Keller	(Australia) Rebecca McConnell	(Switzerland) Jolanda Neff
2023	(Netherlands) Puck Pieterse	(Switzerland) Alessandra Keller	(United Kingdom) Evie Richards
2024	(Switzerland) Alessandra Keller	(United Kingdom) Evie Richards	(Australia) Rebecca Henderson
2025	(United Kingdom) Evie Richards	(Sweden) Jenny Rissveds	(Switzerland) Alessandra Keller
2026	(Switzerland) Sina Frei	(Sweden) Jenny Rissveds	(Italy) Martina Berta

=== Cross-country time-trial ===
==== Men ====
Year	1st	2nd	3rd
2001	(Italy) Marco Bui	(Canada) Roland Green	(Denmark) Michael Rasmussen

==== Women ====
Year	1st	2nd	3rd
2001	(Switzerland) Barbara Blatter	(Italy) Annabella Stropparo	(Spain) Margarita Fullana

=== Marathon (XCM) ===
==== Men ====
Year	1st	2nd	3rd
2005	(Italy) Mauro Bettin	(Austria) Alban Lakata	(Italy) Dario Acquaroli
2006	(Colombia) Leonardo Páez	(France) Thomas Dietsch	(Italy) Roland Stauder
2007	(France) Thomas Dietsch	(Italy) Massimo de Bertolis	(Austria) Alban Lakata
2008	(Colombia) Leonardo Páez	(France) Thomas Dietsch	(Austria) Alban Lakata

==== Women ====
Year	1st	2nd	3rd
2005	(Switzerland) Daniela Louis	(Switzerland) Esther Süss	(Sweden) Anna Enocsson
2006	(Finland) Pia Sundstedt	(Switzerland) Esther Süss	(Italy) Elena Giacomuzzi
2007	(Finland) Pia Sundstedt	(Switzerland) Esther Süss	(Germany) Ivonne Kraft
2008	(Finland) Pia Sundstedt	(Switzerland) Esther Süss	(Slovenia) Blaža Klemenčič

=== Downhill (DHI) ===
==== Men ====
Season	Winner	Runner-up	Third
1993	(Germany) Jürgen Beneke	(United States) John Tomac	(Italy) Stefano Migliorini
1994	(France) François Gachet	(Germany) Jürgen Beneke	(France) Nicolas Vouilloz
1995	(France) Nicolas Vouilloz	(United States) Mike King	(United States) Myles Rockwell
1996	(France) Nicolas Vouilloz	(Germany) Marcus Klausmann	(Spain) Tomás Misser
1997	(Italy) Corrado Herin	(Germany) Jürgen Beneke	(Spain) Tomás Misser
1998	(France) Nicolas Vouilloz	(Spain) David Vázquez López	(France) Cédric Gracia
1999	(France) Nicolas Vouilloz	(United Kingdom) Steve Peat	(Netherlands) Gerwin Peters
2000	(France) Nicolas Vouilloz	(United Kingdom) Steve Peat	(Spain) David Vázquez López
2001	(South Africa) Greg Minnaar	(France) Nicolas Vouilloz	(France) Mickael Pascal
2002	(United Kingdom) Steve Peat	(France) Cédric Gracia	(Australia) Chris Kovarik
2003	(Australia) Nathan Rennie	(France) Cédric Gracia	(France) Mickael Pascal
2004	(United Kingdom) Steve Peat	(Australia) Sam Hill	(Australia) Nathan Rennie
2005	(South Africa) Greg Minnaar	(Australia) Sam Hill	(Australia) Nathan Rennie
2006	(United Kingdom) Steve Peat	(Australia) Sam Hill	(South Africa) Greg Minnaar
2007	(Australia) Sam Hill	(Finland) Matti Lehikoinen	(United Kingdom) Steve Peat
2008	(South Africa) Greg Minnaar	(Australia) Sam Hill	(United Kingdom) Gee Atherton
2009	(Australia) Sam Hill	(South Africa) Greg Minnaar	(United Kingdom) Steve Peat
2010	(United Kingdom) Gee Atherton	(South Africa) Greg Minnaar	(United States) Aaron Gwin
2011	(United States) Aaron Gwin	(South Africa) Greg Minnaar	(United Kingdom) Gee Atherton
2012	(United States) Aaron Gwin	(South Africa) Greg Minnaar	(United Kingdom) Gee Atherton
2013	(Canada) Steve Smith	(United Kingdom) Gee Atherton	(South Africa) Greg Minnaar
2014	(United Kingdom) Josh Bryceland	(United States) Aaron Gwin	(Australia) Troy Brosnan
2015	(United States) Aaron Gwin	(France) Loïc Bruni	(Australia) Troy Brosnan
2016	(United States) Aaron Gwin	(United Kingdom) Danny Hart	(Australia) Troy Brosnan
2017	(United States) Aaron Gwin	(Australia) Troy Brosnan	(South Africa) Greg Minnaar
2018	(France) Amaury Pierron	(United Kingdom) Danny Hart	(Australia) Troy Brosnan
2019	(France) Loïc Bruni	(France) Amaury Pierron	(Australia) Troy Brosnan
2020	(United Kingdom) Matt Walker	(France) Loïc Bruni	(South Africa) Greg Minnaar
2021	(France) Loïc Bruni	(France) Thibaut Dapréla	(France) Loris Vergier
2022	(France) Amaury Pierron	(France) Loris Vergier	(Canada) Finn Iles
2023	(France) Loïc Bruni	(Canada) Jackson Goldstone	(France) Loris Vergier
2024	(France) Loïc Bruni	(Australia) Troy Brosnan	(France) Amaury Pierron
2025	(Canada) Jackson Goldstone	(France) Loïc Bruni	(United States) Luca Shaw
2026	(United States) Asa Vermette	(United Kingdom) Jordan Williams	(France) Amaury Pierron

- Medals by rider:

Rank	Rider	Gold	Silver	Bronze	Total
1	(France) Nicolas Vouilloz	5	1	1	7
1	(United States) Aaron Gwin	5	1	1	7
3	(France) Loïc Bruni	4	3	–	7
4	(South Africa) Greg Minnaar	3	4	4	11
5	(United Kingdom) Steve Peat	3	2	2	7
6	(Australia) Sam Hill	2	4	–	6
7	(France) Amaury Pierron	2	1	2	5
8	(Germany) Jürgen Beneke	1	2	–	3
9	(United Kingdom) Gee Atherton	1	1	3	5
10	(Australia) Nathan Rennie	1	–	2	3
11	(Canada) Jackson Goldstone	1	1	-	2
12	(United Kingdom) Josh Bryceland	1	–	–	1
12	(Canada) Steve Smith	1	–	–	1
12	(Italy) Corrado Herin	1	–	–	1
12	(France) François Gachet	1	–	–	1
12	(United Kingdom) Matt Walker	1	–	–	1
12	(United States) Asa Vermette	1	–	–	1
17	(Australia) Troy Brosnan	–	2	5	7
18	(France) Cédric Gracia	–	2	1	3
19	(United Kingdom) Danny Hart	–	2	–	2
20	(United Kingdom) Jordan Williams		1	–	1
Total		33	26	20	79

- Medals by country:

Rank	Nation	Gold	Silver	Bronze	Total
1	France	12	9	8	29
2	Great Britain	6	6	5	17
3	United States	6	3	3	12
4	Australia	3	6	8	17
5	South Africa	3	4	4	11
6	Canada	2	1	1	4
7	Germany	1	3	0	4
8	Italy	1	0	1	2
9	Spain	0	1	3	4
10	Finland	0	1	0	1
11	Netherlands	0	0	1	1
Totals (11 entries)		34	34	34	102

- Total stages won by rider (after Leogang) ^{+ world champs}

Rank	Rider	Wins	2nd	3rd
1	(South Africa) Greg Minnaar	22^{+4}	26^{+4}	18^{+3}
2	(United States) Aaron Gwin	20	7	4^{+1}
3	(United Kingdom) Steve Peat	17^{+1}	11^{+4}	11
4	(France) Nicolas Vouilloz	16^{+7}	13	9
5	(Australia) Sam Hill	13^{+3}	8^{+1}	9^{+2}
6	(France) Amaury Pierron	13	5^{+1}	3^{+1}
7	(France) Loïc Bruni	12^{+5}	14	9
8	(United Kingdom) Gee Atherton	8^{+2}	12^{+1}	10^{+1}
9	(France) Loris Vergier	7^{+1}	6	6^{+1}
10	(Canada) Jackson Goldstone	7^{+1}	1	1
11	(France) Fabien Barel	5^{+2}	2^{+1}	4^{+1}
12	(United Kingdom) Danny Hart	4^{+2}	6	10^{+1}
13	(Australia) Chris Kovarik	4	5	1^{+1}
14	(Germany) Jürgen Beneke	4	5	-
15	(Spain) David Vázquez López	4	3	4
16	(Canada) Steve Smith	4	3^{+1}	1^{+1}
17	(France) François Gachet	4^{+1}	1^{+1}	-
18	(Australia) Troy Brosnan	3	7^{+1}	9^{+2}
19	(France) Cédric Gracia	3	7	2^{+1}
20	(United Kingdom) Josh Bryceland	3	3^{+1}	2^{+1}
21	(United States) John Tomac	3	1^{+2}	2
22	(Italy) Corrado Hérin	3	-	2^{+1}
23	(Spain) Tomás Misser	3	-	1
24	(France) Mickael Pascal	2	5^{+2}	6^{+2}
25	(Canada) Finn Iles	2	5	3^{+1}
26	(France) Thibaut Dapréla	2	3	3
27	(France) Benoit Coulanges	2	1^{+1}	-
28	(Republic of Ireland) Rónán Dunne	2	1	0^{+1}
29	(United Kingdom) Marc Beaumont	2	-	1
30	(Finland) Matti Lehikoinen	2	-	-
31	(Australia) Nathan Rennie	1	5	8^{+1}
32	(United States) Mike King	1^{+1}	4	0^{+1}
33	(Austria) Andreas Kolb	1	3^{+1}	4
34	(United States) Luca Shaw	1	3	-
35	(Australia) Michael Hannah	1	2^{+2}	6^{+1}
36	(United Kingdom) Laurie Greenland	1	2^{+1}	5^{+1}
37	(New Zealand) Brook MacDonald	1	1	4
37	(United States) Myles Rockwell	1^{+1}	1	4^{+1}
39	(United Kingdom) Matt Walker	1	1	2
39	(New Zealand) Sam Blenkinsop	1	1	2^{+1}
41	(France) Rémi Thirion	1	1	1^{+1}
Podiums active	Reece Wilson(2)^{+1}, Martin Maes(2), Jordan Williams(3), Oisin O'Callaghan(2), Luke Meier-Smith, Asa Vermette, Henri Kiefer(4)^{+1}, Max Hartenstein, Bernard Kerr, Dakotah Norton(4), Ethan Craik, Angel Suarez Alonso(2), Baptiste Pierron, Lachlan Stevens-McNab (2)			

==== Women ====
Season	Winner	Runner-up	Third
1993	(Germany) Regina Stiefl	(Italy) Giovanna Bonazzi	(United States) Missy Giove
1994	(United States) Kim Sonier	(France) Anne-Caroline Chausson	(United States) Missy Giove
1995	(Germany) Regina Stiefl	(Italy) Giovanna Bonazzi	(United States) Kim Sonier
1996	(United States) Missy Giove	(France) Anne-Caroline Chausson	(United States) Leigh Donovan
1997	(United States) Missy Giove	(France) Anne-Caroline Chausson	(United States) Leigh Donovan
1998	(France) Anne-Caroline Chausson	(United States) Missy Giove	(France) Nolvenn Le Caer
1999	(France) Anne-Caroline Chausson	(United States) Missy Giove	(Finland) Katja Repo
2000	(France) Anne-Caroline Chausson	(United States) Missy Giove	(United States) Leigh Donovan
2001	(France) Anne-Caroline Chausson	(United States) Missy Giove	(France) Sabrina Jonnier
2002	(France) Anne-Caroline Chausson	(France) Sabrina Jonnier	(United Kingdom) Tracy Moseley
2003	(France) Sabrina Jonnier	(United Kingdom) Fionn Griffiths	(United Kingdom) Tracy Moseley
2004	(France) Céline Gros	(France) Sabrina Jonnier	(Switzerland) Marielle Saner
2005	(France) Sabrina Jonnier	(United Kingdom) Tracy Moseley	(United Kingdom) Rachel Atherton
2006	(United Kingdom) Tracy Moseley	(France) Sabrina Jonnier	(United Kingdom) Rachel Atherton
2007	(France) Sabrina Jonnier	(United Kingdom) Tracy Moseley	(Australia) Tracey Hannah
2008	(United Kingdom) Rachel Atherton	(France) Sabrina Jonnier	(United Kingdom) Tracy Moseley
2009	(France) Sabrina Jonnier	(United Kingdom) Tracy Moseley	(France) Emmeline Ragot
2010	(France) Sabrina Jonnier	(France) Floriane Pugin	(France) Myriam Nicole
2011	(United Kingdom) Tracy Moseley	(France) Floriane Pugin	(United Kingdom) Rachel Atherton
2012	(United Kingdom) Rachel Atherton	(France) Emmeline Ragot	(France) Myriam Nicole
2013	(United Kingdom) Rachel Atherton	(France) Emmeline Ragot	(United Kingdom) Manon Carpenter
2014	(United Kingdom) Manon Carpenter	(United Kingdom) Rachel Atherton	(France) Emmeline Ragot
2015	(United Kingdom) Rachel Atherton	(United Kingdom) Manon Carpenter	(United Kingdom) Tahnee Seagrave
2016	(United Kingdom) Rachel Atherton	(United Kingdom) Manon Carpenter	(Australia) Tracey Hannah
2017	(France) Myriam Nicole	(United Kingdom) Tahnee Seagrave	(Australia) Tracey Hannah
2018	(United Kingdom) Rachel Atherton	(United Kingdom) Tahnee Seagrave	(Australia) Tracey Hannah
2019	(Australia) Tracey Hannah	(France) Marine Cabirou	(Italy) Veronica Widmann
2020	(France) Marine Cabirou	(France) Myriam Nicole	(Germany) Nina Hoffmann
2021	(Austria) Valentina Höll	(France) Myriam Nicole	(Switzerland) Camille Balanche
2022	(Switzerland) Camille Balanche	(France) Myriam Nicole	(Austria) Valentina Höll
2023	(Austria) Valentina Höll	(Germany) Nina Hoffmann	(France) Marine Cabirou
2024	(Austria) Valentina Höll	(France) Marine Cabirou	(United Kingdom) Tahnée Seagrave
2025	(Austria) Valentina Höll	(Canada) Gracey Hemstreet	(United Kingdom) Tahnée Seagrave
2026	(Austria) Valentina Höll	(United Kingdom) Harriet Harnden	(Canada) Gracey Hemstreet

- Medals by rider:

Rank	Rider	Gold	Silver	Bronze	Total
1	(United Kingdom) Rachel Atherton	6	1	3	10
2	(France) Sabrina Jonnier	5	4	1	10
3	(France) Anne-Caroline Chausson	5	3	–	8
4	(Austria) Valentina Höll	5	–	1	6
5	(United States) Missy Giove	2	4	2	8
6	(United Kingdom) Tracy Moseley	2	3	3	8
7	(Germany) Regina Stiefl	2	–	–	2
8	(France) Myriam Nicole	1	3	2	6
9	(United Kingdom) Manon Carpenter	1	2	1	4
9	(France) Marine Cabirou	1	2	1	4
11	(Australia) Tracey Hannah	1	–	4	5
12	(Switzerland) Camille Balanche	1	–	1	2
12	(Canada) Kim Sonier	1	–	1	2
14	(France) Céline Gros	1	–	–	1
15	(United Kingdom) Tahnee Seagrave	–	2	3	5
16	(France) Emmeline Ragot	–	2	2	4
17	(France) Floriane Pugin	–	2	–	2
17	(Italy) Giovanna Bonazzi	–	2	–	2
19	(Germany) Nina Hoffmann	–	1	1	2
20	(United Kingdom) Fionn Griffiths	–	1	–	1
20	(Canada) Gracey Hemstreet	–	1	–	1
22	(United States) Leigh Donovan	–	–	3	3
23	(Finland) Katja Repo	–	–	1	1
23	(Switzerland) Marielle Saner	–	–	1	1
23	(France) Nolvenn Le Caer	–	–	1	1
23	(Italy) Veronica Widmann	–	–	1	1
Total		33	33	33	99

- Medals by country:

Rank	Nation	Gold	Silver	Bronze	Total
1	France	13	16	7	36
2	(United Kingdom) Great Britain	9	9	10	28
3	Austria	4	–	1	5
4	United States	2	4	5	11
5	Germany	2	1	1	4
6	Canada	1	1	1	3
7	Australia	1	–	4	5
8	Switzerland	1	–	2	3
9	Italy	–	2	1	3
10	Finland	–	–	1	1
Totals (10 entries)		33	33	33	99

==== Junior Men ====
Year	1st	2nd	3rd
2010	(Australia) Troy Brosnan	(New Zealand) George Brannigan	(United Kingdom) Lewis Buchanan
2011	(Australia) Troy Brosnan	(France) Loïc Bruni	(United States) Neko Mulally
2012	(France) Loïc Bruni	(Australia) Connor Fearon	(United States) Richard Rude Jr
2013	(United States) Richie Rude	(France) Loris Vergier	(United Kingdom) Michael Jones
2014	(France) Loris Vergier	(United States) Luca Shaw	(United Kingdom) Taylor Vernon
2015	(United Kingdom) Laurie Greenland	(Australia) Andrew Crimmins	(Republic of Ireland) Jacob Dickson
2016	(Canada) Finnley Iles	(France) Gaëtan Vige	(United Kingdom) Elliott Heap
2017	(Canada) Finnley Iles	(France) Sylvain Cougoureux	(United Kingdom) Matt Walker
2018	(France) Thibaut Dapréla	(United Kingdom) Henry Kerr	(United Kingdom) Kade Edwards
2019	(France) Thibaut Dapréla	(Australia) Kie A'Hern	(Canada) Lucas Cruz
2020	(United Kingdom) Ethan Craik	(Republic of Ireland) Oisin O'Callaghan	(Portugal) Nuno Reis
2021	(Canada) Jackson Goldstone	(United Kingdom) Jordan Williams	(Spain) Pau Menoyo Busquets
2022	(Canada) Jackson Goldstone	(United Kingdom) Jordan Williams	(New Zealand) Lachlan Stevens-McNab
2023	(United States) Ryan Pinkerton	(France) Nathan Pontvianne	(Canada) Bodhi Kuhn
2024	(France) Max Alran	(New Zealand) Luke Wayman	(United States) Asa Vermette
2025	(France) Max Alran	(United States) Asa Vermette	(New Zealand) Tyler Waite
2026	(New Zealand) Jonty Williamson	(New Zealand) Malik Boatwright	(New Zealand) Camden Rutherfurd

=== Dual-slalom ===
==== Men ====
Year	1st	2nd	3rd
1998	(United States) Brian Lopes	(United States) Dave Cullinan	(United States) Eric Carter
1999	(United States) Eric Carter	(United States) Brian Lopes	(France) Cédric Gracia
2000	(United States) Brian Lopes	(France) Cédric Gracia	(Australia) Wade Bootes
2001	(United States) Brian Lopes	(United States) Eric Carter	(France) Mickael Deldycke

==== Women ====
Year	1st	2nd	3rd
1998	(Australia) Katrina Miller	(Switzerland) Sari Jörgensen	(France) Sabrina Jonnier
1999	(Australia) Katrina Miller	(United States) Leigh Donovan	(United States) Tara Llanes
2000	(France) Anne-Caroline Chausson	(United States) Tara Llanes	(United States) Leigh Donovan
2001	(United States) Leigh Donovan	(Australia) Katrina Miller	(United States) Tara Llanes

=== Four-cross (4X) ===
==== Men ====
Year	1st	2nd	3rd
2002	(United States) Brian Lopes	(France) Cédric Gracia	(United States) Mike King
2003	(United States) Eric Carter	(Czech Republic) Michal Prokop	(United States) Mike King
2004	(Czech Republic) Michal Prokop	(United States) Brian Lopes	(Germany) Guido Tschugg
2005	(United States) Brian Lopes	(Czech Republic) Michal Prokop	(France) Cédric Gracia
2006	(Czech Republic) Michal Prokop	(Australia) Jared Graves	(Czech Republic) Kamil Tatarkovič
2007	(United States) Brian Lopes	(Czech Republic) Michal Prokop	(Australia) Jared Graves
2008	(Spain) Rafael Alvarez De Lara Lucas	(Germany) Guido Tschugg	(United Kingdom) Dan Atherton
2009	(Australia) Jared Graves	(Netherlands) Joost Wichman	(France) Romain Saladini
2010	(Australia) Jared Graves	(Czech Republic) Tomáš Slavík	(Netherlands) Joost Wichman
2011	(Australia) Jared Graves	(Switzerland) Roger Rinderknecht	(Czech Republic) Tomáš Slavík

==== Women ====
Year	1st	2nd	3rd
2002	(France) Anne-Caroline Chausson	(France) Sabrina Jonnier	(Australia) Katrina Miller
2003	(Australia) Katrina Miller	(France) Sabrina Jonnier	(Japan) Mio Suemasa
2004	(France) Sabrina Jonnier	(United States) Tara Llanes	(United States) Jill Kintner
2005	(United States) Jill Kintner	(Netherlands) Anneke Beerten	(Czech Republic) Jana Horáková
2006	(United States) Jill Kintner	(Australia) Katrina Miller	(United States) Tara Llanes
2007	(Netherlands) Anneke Beerten	(United States) Jill Kintner	(Japan) Mio Suemasa
2008	(Netherlands) Anneke Beerten	(Austria) Anita Molcik	(United States) Melissa Buhl
2009	(Netherlands) Anneke Beerten	(United Kingdom) Fionn Griffiths	(United States) Jill Kintner
2010	(Austria) Anita Molcik	(Netherlands) Anneke Beerten	(Czech Republic) Jana Horáková
2011	(Netherlands) Anneke Beerten	(United States) Melissa Buhl	(Switzerland) Lucia Oetjen
