= 1999 UCI Mountain Bike World Cup =

- Date: May–August 1999

The 1999 UCI Mountain Bike World Cup were the 1999 mountain biking world cup races and were held in three disciplines: Cross-country, Downhill and Dual for both men and women.

== Cross country ==
Schedule
nr	date	venue	host nation
1	27–28 March 1999	Napa, CA	USA
2	10–11.04.1999	Sydney	Australia
3	24–25 February 1999	Madrid	Spain
4	8–9.05.1999	St. Wendel	Germany
5	15–16 May 1999	Plymouth	Great Britain
6	19–20 June 1999	Conyers, GA	USA
7	3–4.07.1999	Canmore, Alberta	Canada
8	4–5.09.1999	Houffalize	Belgium

== Downhill ==
=== Schedule ===
nr	date	venue	host nation	results
1	22.-23.05.1999	Les Gets	France	n/a
2	29.-30.05.1999	Maribor	Slovenia	n/a
3	05.-06.06.1999	Nevegal	Italy	n/a
4	26.-27.06.1999	Big Bear	United States	n/a
5	10.-11.07.1999	Squaw Valley	United States	n/a
6	31.07–01.08.1999	Mont Sainte Anne	Canada	n/a
7	07.-08.08.1999	Bromont	Canada	n/a
8	14.-15.08.1999	Kaprun	Austria	n/a

=== Men's final table ===
place	name	nat	birth	age	team	total	1	2	3	4	5	6	7	8
1	Nicolas Vouilloz	France	8 February 1976	24	TEAM SUNN	1493	170	250	250	95	250	200	250	28
2	Steve Peat	Great Britain	17 June 1974	25	TEAM GT	1276	250	200	170	200	95	250	52	59
3	Gerwin Peters	Netherlands	9 April 1977	22	BE-ONE TEAM	1100	80	170	150	170	150	63	67	250
4	Mickael Pascal	France	11 October 1979	20	TEAM SUNN	1005	95	90	200	90	85	170	200	75
5	Cédric Gracia	France	23 March 1978	21	VOLVO CANNONDALE	773	200	46	85	43	59	95	150	95
6	Shaun Palmer	United States	14 November 1968	31	MT DEW SPECIALIZ	638	150	71	0	250	63	22	63	19
7	David Vazquez-López	Spain	10 February 1979	21	MT DEW SPECIALIZ	625	0	43	90	150	170	71	71	30
8	Johan Engström	Sweden	2 August 1977	22	VOLVO CANNONDALE	608	90	85	67	40	80	25	21	200
9	Eric Carter	United States	6 March 1970	30	TEAM GT	519	52	0	19	52	9	150	170	67
10	Myles Rockwell	United States	22 August 1972	27	GIANT	514	21	80	130	63	90	130	0	0
11	Guillaume Koch	France	5 June 1973	26	SCOTT ONE LIFE L	511	130	63	32	67	0	34	130	55
12	Kirt Voreis	United States	31 May 1974	25	MT DEW SPECIALIZ	474	34	130	24	130	71	12	49	24
13	Kristian Eriksson	Sweden	26 October 1976	23	SCOTT ONE LIFE L	407	30	75	63	18	0	55	95	71
14	Jan Lundman	Sweden	12 March 1978	22		402	0	49	80	0	28	40	55	150
15	Bas de Bever	Netherlands	16 April 1968	31	BE-ONE TEAM	394	71	67	0	32	130	90	4	0
16	Markus Klausmann	Germany	8 August 1977	22	BE-ONE TEAM	390	12	95	59	0	0	30	24	170
17	Robert Warner	Great Britain	16 September 1970	29	GIANT	375	0	55	95	75	0	49	80	21
18	Sean McCarroll	Australia	5 November 1977	22	GIANT	369	63	34	40	71	55	85	3	18
19	Crawford Carrick-Anderson	Great Britain	26 May 1970	29	GIANT UK DOWN HI	367	55	52	3	30	46	6	90	85
20	Oscar Saiz	Spain	28 August 1973	26	MT DEW SPECIALIZ	342	0	150	75	37	0	80	0	0
21	John Kirkcaldie	New Zealand	30 April 1976	23	SCHWINN TOYOTA R	321	75	18	28	55	37	28	0	80
22	Christopher Kovarik	Australia	1 March 1978	22	QRANC/GT PRO JRX	303	0	0	0	28	200	0	75	0
23	Markolf Erasmus Berchtold	Brazil	9 February 1980	20	SCOTT-MERCEDES	299	67	40	8	0	49	24	85	26
24	Corrado Herin	Italy	4 August 1966	33	SINTESI VERLICCH	295	37	8	71	13	25	59	30	52
25	Mike King	United States	30 June 1969	30	HARO	282	0	30	49	59	67	23	14	40
26	Greg Minnaar	South Africa	13 November 1981	18	KONA	213	0	19	20	85	34	32	0	23
27	Pau Misser	Spain	7 August 1976	23	MISSER BROS	198	49	59	0	0	23	0	40	27
28	Tomas Misser	Spain	30 September 1974	25	MISSER BROS	194	24	0	55	0	0	52	0	63
29	Iván Oulego-Moreno	Spain	4 June 1976	23	KASTLE	189	46	23	52	0	0	37	18	13
30	Michael Ronning	Australia	23 June 1975	24	OAKLEY, TROY LEE	180	0	0	0	34	75	43	28	0
31	Nathan Rennie	Australia	31 May 1981	18	QRANC/GT PRO JRX	166	0	0	0	10	30	67	59	0
32	Jürgen Beneke	Germany	23 February 1972	28	GIANT	150	85	0	25	0	40	0	0	0
33	Florent Poussin	France	6 March 1977	23	TEAM SUNN	149	19	0	0	0	0	0	0	130
34	Filip Polc	Slovakia	10 April 1982	17	SEAT MERIDA KCK	145	0	20	18	0	24	17	23	43
35	Karim Amour	France	18 January 1975	25	GT FRANCE	137	4	32	46	23	0	0	0	32
36	Cyril Lagneau	France	19 July 1976	23	SCOTT/ONE LIFE L	135	0	28	7	0	10	0	0	90
37	Colin Bailey	United States	9 August 1979	20	DANGER ULTD TROY	123	0	0	0	80	43	0	0	0
38	Brian Lopes	United States	9 September 1971	28	VOLVO CANNONDALE	121	59	15	0	24	7	16	0	0
39	Scott Sharples	Australia	23 October 1967	32	TREK/VOLKSWAGEN	107	5	0	22	49	18	13	0	0
40	Nathan Rankin	New Zealand	30 April 1979	20	FOES/AZONIC	104	0	0	0	7	0	75	22	0
41	Will Longden	Great Britain	23 November 1974	25	MBUK SPECIALIZED	103	0	7	0	0	52	4	25	15
42	Bruno Zanchi	Italy	10 November 1973	26	BIKE O'CLOCK	102	0	0	30	0	4	0	43	25
43	Shaums March	United States	16 February 1974	26	SCHWINN TOYOTA R	99	0	0	0	21	32	0	46	0
44	Cesar Rojo	Spain	17 April 1981	18	CORONAS-BH	93	0	22	23	0	0	0	2	46
45	Andrew Shandro	Canada	20 May 1971	28	K2 BIKE	86	28	0	0	0	19	20	19	0
46	Jason Sigfrid	United States	23 February 1973	27	STORM CYCLES	85	0	0	0	22	21	10	32	0
47	Tim Ponting	Great Britain	10 October 1972	27	ANIMAL PLAYSTATI	80	20	9	0	17	0	0	0	34
48	Gary Houseman	United States	3 September 1980	19	TROY LEE/DEVO	77	0	0	0	19	17	21	20	0
49	Jacky Sery	France	16 June 1981	18	TEAM SUNN	75	7	25	37	0	0	0	0	6
50	Chris O'Driscoll	United States	8 March 1973	27	SOLID-ELLSWORTH	75	0	0	21	16	16	7	15	0
51	William Balaud	France	17 February 1977	23	GT FRANCE	74	0	10	16	20	15	8	5	0
52	Ed Moseley	Great Britain	21 April 1977	22		68	0	16	14	0	0	1	37	0
53	Michel Joseph	Switzerland	9 November 1976	23	VEVEY CYCLE TEAM	66	15	6	0	0	13	18	0	14
54	Nigel Page	Great Britain	1 February 1972	28	INTENSE/KAWASKI	65	25	21	0	11	8	0	0	0
55	Andreas Steffen	Switzerland	23 September 1975	24	LION/CYCLECRAFT/	61	0	0	0	0	11	0	34	16
56	Guido Tschugg	Germany	14 May 1976	23	NPJ-DUAL SLALMON	57	40	17	0	0	0	0	0	0
57	René Wildhaber	Switzerland	23 October 1976	23	SCHWINN HOMEGROW	56	0	0	0	0	0	0	7	49
58	Mickaël Deldycke	France	26 August 1980	19	SCHWINN FRANCE	54	17	0	0	0	0	0	0	37
59	Claudio Caluori	Switzerland	16 September 1977	22	TEAM TOMAC SWITZ	52	0	0	6	0	0	46	0	0
60	Adrian Vesenbeck	Germany	11 July 1979	20	DIAMOND-STEPPENW	51	3	24	12	0	0	0	0	12
61	Philip Tinstman	United States	16 August 1974	25	VANS/IRON HORSE	51	0	0	0	46	5	0	0	0
62	Rob Sears	United States	29 July 1970	29	DIRTWORKS	47	0	0	15	15	3	14	0	0
63	Derin Stockton	United States	30 October 1968	31	MAXXIS TIRES	43	0	0	43	0	0	0	0	0
64	Thomas Ryser	Switzerland	9 May 1978	21		43	43	0	0	0	0	0	0	0
65	David Cullinan	United States	29 October 1969	30	SCHWINN/TOYOTA	37	0	37	0	0	0	0	0	0
66	Michel Kruiper	Netherlands	20 September 1973	26	DUTCH NATIONAL T	36	16	0	0	0	0	0	0	20
67	Randy Lawrence	United States	8 October 1967	32	INTENSE CYCLES	36	13	0	0	9	14	0	0	0
68	Jeremy Purdy	United States	26 November 1969	30	FOX	34	0	0	0	12	22	0	0	0
69	Robin Kitchin	Great Britain	3 September 1972	27	ANIMAL PLAYSTATI	34	0	0	34	0	0	0	0	0
70	Christian Taillefer	France	29 August 1970	29		32	32	0	0	0	0	0	0	0
71	John Waddell	Australia	2 September 1980	19	GT/QRANC PRO JRX	31	0	0	0	0	0	19	12	0
72	Jared Rando	Australia	22 June 1981	18	MOUNTAIN CYCLE/D	28	0	0	0	0	12	0	16	0
73	Daniel Šimčík	Czech Republic	9 January 1978	22	ROCK MACHINE	28	23	0	5	0	0	0	0	0
74	Olivier Ochin	France	4 April 1977	22	ANCILLOTTI	26	0	0	0	0	0	15	1	10
75	Stéphane Jany	France	17 July 1973	26	GT FRANCE	25	0	0	0	25	0	0	0	0
76	Frank Schneider	Germany	3 October 1978	21	RSV NEUSTADT M	24	0	0	2	0	0	0	0	22
77	Johan Dovemark	Sweden	30 June 1975	24		24	0	4	17	0	0	3	0	0
78	Jacobo Santana	Spain	17 July 1972	27	CC SANT JORDI	24	11	13	0	0	0	0	0	0
79	Wilfred van der Haterd	Netherlands	25 January 1972	28	BE-ONE TEAM	23	0	14	0	0	0	9	0	0
80	Samuel Peridy	France	2 April 1968	31		22	22	0	0	0	0	0	0	0
81	Glyn O'Brien	Ireland	6 September 1977	22	ANIMAL/ORANGE	21	0	0	0	0	2	0	8	11
82	Todd Snider	United States	13 July 1976	23	ODI	21	0	0	0	1	20	0	0	0
83	Tobias Westman	Sweden	22 June 1979	20		19	0	0	0	0	0	2	13	4
84	Carlos Barcons	Spain	28 April 1970	29	SCOTT	18	8	0	10	0	0	0	0	0
85	Nicolas Pierre	France	12 January 1976	24		18	18	0	0	0	0	0	0	0
86	John Tomac	United States	3 November 1967	32	TOMAC/MANITOU	17	0	0	0	0	0	0	0	17
87	Rob Hewitt	Canada	20 November 1978	21	DEEP COVE/ANSWER	17	0	0	0	0	0	0	17	0
88	Steve Geall	Great Britain	6 May 1970	29	SPOOKY	17	0	0	9	8	0	0	0	0
89	Richard Warner	Great Britain	19 February 1976	24	GIANT UK DOWN HI	15	0	5	1	0	0	0	0	9
90	Richard Houseman	United States	20 March 1978	22	TOMAC/MANITOU	15	0	0	0	6	0	0	9	0
91	Girard Meloncon	United States	11 February 1974	26	TEAM MONGOOSE	14	0	0	0	14	0	0	0	0
92	Aniti-Pekka Laiho	Finland	2 March 1976	24	FINLAND	14	14	0	0	0	0	0	0	0
93	Markus Stindl	Austria	11 February 1976	24	OAMTC RS GEROS	13	0	0	13	0	0	0	0	0
94	David Watson	Canada	23 May 1976	23	ROCKY MOUNTAIN	12	0	1	0	0	0	11	0	0
95	Alexandre Balaud	France	27 February 1975	25		12	0	12	0	0	0	0	0	0
96	Chad Onyschuk	Canada	1 June 1975	24	FORD-DEVINCI	11	0	0	0	0	0	0	11	0
97	José Ángel Gutiérrez-Boe	Spain	11 June 1977	22	KASTLE	11	0	0	11	0	0	0	0	0
98	Michal Maroši	Czech Republic	21 May 1972	27	ROCK MACHINE	11	0	11	0	0	0	0	0	0
99	Jimmy Coll	Canada	15 November 1972	27	MARIN	10	0	0	0	0	0	0	10	0
100	Alexandre Vahie-Cordero	France	1 March 1979	21		10	10	0	0	0	0	0	0	0
101	Andy Büler	Switzerland	9 June 1978	21	FIAT ROTWILD	9	0	0	0	2	0	0	0	7
102	Stefan Herrmann	Germany	13 February 1964	36	FIAT ROTWILD	9	9	0	0	0	0	0	0	0
103	Franck Parolin	France	20 March 1981	19	SCOTT/LA CLUSAZ	8	0	0	0	0	0	0	0	8
104	Olivier Antelme	France	22 July 1980	19		6	0	0	0	0	0	0	6	0
105	Francisco Pizarro	Chile	5 July 1980	19	CHILE NATIONAL	6	0	0	0	0	6	0	0	0
106	Lewis King	Great Britain	31 October 1969	30	GIANT UK DOWN HI	6	6	0	0	0	0	0	0	0
107	Adam Vágner	Czech Republic	25 April 1981	18	GRAFOBAL-ZAMO	5	0	0	0	0	0	0	0	5
108	Eddy Mollier	France	27 October 1971	28	EGS	5	0	0	0	0	0	5	0	0
109	Joe Lawwill	United States	6 May 1970	29	ELLSWORTH/NO FEA	5	0	0	0	5	0	0	0	0
110	Joel Panozzo	Australia	15 July 1979	20	SANTA CRUZ ARNET	4	0	0	0	4	0	0	0	0
111	Janez Grašič	Slovenia	13 January 1969	31	UNI TEAM	4	0	0	4	0	0	0	0	0
112	Jonathon Cheetham	Great Britain	28 February 1981	19	ROTEC	3	0	0	0	0	0	0	0	3
113	Trevor Porter	Canada	29 June 1972	27	RADIAL EDGE	3	0	0	0	3	0	0	0	0
114	John Lawlor	Ireland	5 June 1979	20		3	0	3	0	0	0	0	0	0
115	Denis Bonnet	France	23 June 1977	22		2	0	2	0	0	0	0	0	0
116	Damien Mermoud	Switzerland	20 January 1981	19		2	2	0	0	0	0	0	0	0
117	Ryan White	United States			GIANT	1	0	0	0	0	1	0	0	0
118	Pascal Closset	Belgium	5 December 1973	26	DIESEL-BIANCHI	1	1	0	0	0	0	0	0	0

=== Women's final table ===
place	name	nat	birth	age	team	total	1	2	3	4	5	6	7	8
1	Anne-Caroline Chausson	France	8 October 1977	22	VOLVO CANNONDALE	1950	250	250	250	200	250	250	250	250
2	Missy Giove	United States	2 January 1972	28	FOES/AZONIC	1250	200	75	200	250	95	200	150	80
3	Katja Repo	Finland	4 March 1973	27	FINLAND	1085	130	170	95	95	170	130	200	95
4	Leigh Donovan	United States	12 November 1971	28	INTENSE CYCLES	882	85	200	150	150	32	170	95	0
5	Mercedes González	Spain	11 July 1963	36	TEAM GT	871	67	95	130	130	200	150	67	32
6	Marla Streb	United States	24 June 1965	34	YETI	849	170	0	75	170	130	71	170	63
7	Elke Brutsaert	United States	8 May 1968	31	SCHWINN TOYOTA R	693	75	150	90	67	150	90	71	0
8	Sari Jörgensen	Switzerland	25 July 1980	19	TOMAC MANITOU	684	150	59	59	59	59	43	55	200
9	Marielle Saner	Switzerland	22 March 1977	22	HOT CHILI	609	40	90	170	30	75	85	85	34
10	Lisa Sher	United States	19 April 1969	30	FOES/AZONIC	578	52	130	67	71	43	95	80	40
11	Sarah Stieger	Switzerland	25 August 1979	20	FIAT ROTWILD	565	0	63	63	49	55	55	130	150
12	Giovanna Bonazzi	Italy	24 July 1966	33	DH RACING KASTLE	500	95	30	80	0	67	75	63	90
13	Helen Mortimer	Great Britain	1 August 1976	23	MBUK SPECIALIZED	496	71	85	0	80	40	63	90	67
14	Malin Lindgren	Sweden	24 August 1974	25	SCOTT ONE LIFE L	409	55	80	85	63	0	67	59	0
15	Nolvenn Le Caer	France	23 February 1978	22	TEAM GT	340	0	71	71	90	49	59	0	0
16	Tara Llanes	United States	28 November 1976	23	MT DEW SPECIALIZ	275	0	49	55	34	85	52	0	0
17	Sabrina Jonnier	France	19 August 1981	18	SUNN	260	90	0	0	0	0	0	0	170
18	Cheri Elliott	United States	17 April 1970	29	MAXXIS/TOMAC	255	0	0	0	85	90	80	0	0
19	Tracy Moseley	Great Britain	12 April 1979	20	VOLVO CANNONDALE	250	63	0	0	0	80	32	75	0
20	Florentina Möser	Austria	6 January 1967	33	BANK AUSTRIA NAT	216	34	0	52	0	0	0	0	130
21	Katrina Miller	Australia	15 September 1975	24	TEAM JAMIS/SMITH	210	80	55	0	75	0	0	0	0
22	Céline Gros	France	28 January 1983	17	SCOTT/LA CLUSAZ	165	37	0	43	0	0	0	0	85
23	Maren Jüllich	Germany	5 July 1977	22	MONGOOSE	160	46	43	0	0	0	0	0	71
24	Emma Guy	Great Britain	3 May 1970	29	TEAM RALEIGH	156	59	67	0	0	0	0	0	30
25	Britta Kobes	Germany	31 December 1968	31	WHEELER	138	0	52	37	0	0	0	0	49
26	Sandra Walker	Switzerland	19 July 1981	18		129	49	37	0	0	0	0	0	43
27	Adele Croxon	Great Britain	5 October 1975	24	ANIMAL/ORANGE	127	0	28	28	0	34	0	0	37
28	April Lawyer	United States	1 April 1975	24	MAXXIS/FOES	126	0	0	0	46	52	28	0	0
29	Petra Winterhalder	Germany	19 April 1975	24	CYCLE-CRAFT-BUTT	124	32	46	0	0	0	0	0	46
30	Vanessa Quin	New Zealand	15 October 1976	23	GIANT	118	0	0	0	55	63	0	0	0
31	Daamiann Skelton	Canada	5 June 1971	28	ROCKY MOUNTAIN	103	0	0	0	32	71	0	0	0
32	Tai-Lee Muxlow	Australia	2 May 1973	26	GT/HUTCHINSON	98	0	0	0	52	46	0	0	0
33	Helena Kurandová	Czech Republic	21 June 1978	21	KANGAROO/DIRT	93	0	34	0	0	0	0	0	59
34	Stefanie Hasselbeck	Germany	6 December 1973	26	DIAMOND/STEPPENW	89	0	40	49	0	0	0	0	0
35	Miriam Blas-Otondo	Spain	4 July 1979	20	SUNN SPAIN	87	0	0	32	0	0	0	0	55
36	Sylvie Allen	Canada	8 August 1973	26	GIANT	86	0	0	0	0	0	34	52	0
37	Annie Girard	Canada	13 November 1974	25	ROCKY MOUNTAIN	83	0	0	0	0	0	46	37	0
38	Gale Dahlager	United States	31 May 1969	30	BIG CRANK RACING	80	0	0	0	37	0	0	43	0
39	Melissa Buhl	United States	25 January 1982	18	ROCK SHOX DEVO	80	0	0	0	43	0	37	0	0
40	Kathy Pruitt	United States	26 December 1983	16	AZONIC SANTA CRU	77	0	0	0	40	37	0	0	0
41	Karen van Meerbeck	Great Britain	6 December 1971	28	GIANT UK DOWN HILL	75	0	0	0	0	0	0	0	75
42	Tera Meade	Canada	17 March 1974	26	ELLSWORTH/JAVA R	70	0	0	0	0	0	30	40	0
43	Anneke Beerten	Netherlands	7 July 1982	17	BE-ONE TEAM	66	0	32	34	0	0	0	0	0
44	Cecile Gambin	Canada	13 July 1966	33	SCHWINN/TOYOTA	62	0	0	0	0	28	0	34	0
45	Johanna Rübel	Germany	8 December 1980	19	FIAT ROTWILD	52	0	0	0	0	0	0	0	52
46	Lorranie Blancher	Canada	29 October 1975	24	SCHWINN HOMEGROW	49	0	0	0	0	0	0	49	0
47	Danielle Connoly	United States	10 April 1982	17	ROCKSHOX/DEVO	49	0	0	0	0	0	49	0	0
48	Kim Huard	Canada	13 July 1979	20	BALFA	46	0	0	0	0	0	0	46	0
49	Regina Stiefl	Germany	11 October 1966	33	FIAT-ROTWILD	46	0	0	46	0	0	0	0	0
50	Carole Vuillaume	Switzerland	13 June 1977	22		43	43	0	0	0	0	0	0	0
51	Mami Masuda	Japan	6 June 1974	25	MX/HARO	40	0	0	0	0	0	40	0	0
52	Sofia Fagerström	Sweden	7 July 1977	22	BE-ONE TEAM	40	0	0	40	0	0	0	0	0
53	Jen Ashton	Canada	15 July 1972	27	NORCO	32	0	0	0	0	0	0	32	0
54	Heather Schmitz	United States	27 July 1972	27	AMAZON/INTENSE	30	0	0	0	0	30	0	0	0
55	Anja Rees-Jones	Great Britain	25 January 1977	23		30	0	0	30	0	0	0	0	0
56	Carole Grange	France	16 February 1975	25	ANCILLOTTI BIKE	30	30	0	0	0	0	0	0	0
57	Helen Gaskell	Great Britain	16 January 1983	17	HOPE	28	0	0	0	0	0	0	0	28
58	Patricia Loureiro	Brazil	26 January 1980	20	BRAZIL	28	0	0	0	28	0	0	0	0
59	Johanna Rübel-Tödt	Germany	8 December 1980	19	FIAT-ROTWILD	28	28	0	0	0	0	0	0	0

== See also ==
- 1999 UCI Mountain Bike World Championships
- UCI Mountain Bike World Cup
