= 2001 UCI Mountain Bike World Cup =

- Date: April–August 2001

The 2001 UCI Mountain Bike World Cup included four disciplines: cross-country, cross-country time-trial, downhill, and dual-slalom. It was sponsored by Tissot.

The cross-country, downhill and dual-slalom events on 7 and 8 July were originally scheduled to be held at Whistler, but were moved to Grouse Mountain.

== Cross country ==
Date	Venue	Winner (Men)	Winner (Women)
8 April 2001	(United States) Napa Valley	(Spain) José Antonio Hermida	(Switzerland) Barbara Blatter
13 May 2001	(Italy) Sarntal	(France) Miguel Martinez	(Spain) Margarita Fullana
20 May 2001	(Belgium) Houffalize	(Canada) Roland Green	(Spain) Margarita Fullana
8 July 2001	(Canada) Grouse Mountain	(Switzerland) Christoph Sauser	(Switzerland) Barbara Blatter
15 July 2001	(United States) Durango	(France) Julien Absalon	(Australia) Mary Grigson
5 August 2001	(Switzerland) Leysin	(France) Miguel Martinez	(France) Laurence Leboucher
12 August 2001	(Austria) Kaprun	(Switzerland) Thomas Frischknecht	(Spain) Margarita Fullana
26 August 2001	(Canada) Mont Sainte-Anne	(Canada) Roland Green	(Canada) Chrissy Redden
Final Standings	UCI World Cup; Cross Country Championship	(Canada) Roland Green	(Switzerland) Barbara Blatter
Final Standings	UCI World Cup; Cross Country Championship	(Spain) José Antonio Hermida	(United Kingdom) Caroline Alexander
Final Standings	UCI World Cup; Cross Country Championship	(France) Miguel Martinez	(Spain) Margarita Fullana

== Cross-country time-trial ==
Date	Venue	Winner (Men)	Winner (Women)
7 April 2001	(United States) Napa Valley	(Italy) Marco Bui	(Canada) Chrissy Redden
12 May 2001	(Italy) Sarntal	(France) Miguel Martinez	(Spain) Margarita Fullana
19 May 2001	(Belgium) Houffalize	(Italy) Marco Bui	(Spain) Margarita Fullana
4 August 2001	(Switzerland) Leysin	(France) Julien Absalon	(Spain) Margarita Fullana
11 August 2001	(Austria) Kaprun	cancelled due to rain	
Final Standings	UCI World Cup; Cross Country Time-Trial Championship	(Italy) Marco Bui	(Switzerland) Barbara Blatter
Final Standings	UCI World Cup; Cross Country Time-Trial Championship	(Canada) Roland Green	(Italy) Annabella Stropparo
Final Standings	UCI World Cup; Cross Country Time-Trial Championship	(Denmark) Michael Rasmussen	(Spain) Margarita Fullana

== Downhill ==
Date	Venue	Winner (Men)	Winner (Women)
10 June 2001	(Slovenia) Maribor	(United Kingdom) Steve Peat	(France) Anne-Caroline Chausson
17 June 2001	(France) Vars	(United Kingdom) Steve Peat	(France) Anne-Caroline Chausson
8 July 2001	(Canada) Grouse Mountain	(France) Fabien Barel	(France) Anne-Caroline Chausson
15 July 2001	(United States) Durango	(France) Mickael Pascal	(France) Anne-Caroline Chausson
29 July 2001	(Japan) Arai	(France) Nicolas Vouilloz	(France) Anne-Caroline Chausson
5 August 2001	(Switzerland) Leysin	(France) Mickael Pascal	(Finland) Katja Repo
12 August 2001	(Austria) Kaprun	(South Africa) Greg Minnaar	(France) Anne-Caroline Chausson
26 August 2001	(Canada) Mont Sainte-Anne	(Australia) Chris Kovarik	(France) Sabrina Jonnier
Final Standings	UCI World Cup; Downhill Championship	(South Africa) Greg Minnaar	(France) Anne-Caroline Chausson
Final Standings	UCI World Cup; Downhill Championship	(France) Nicolas Vouilloz	(United States) Missy Giove
Final Standings	UCI World Cup; Downhill Championship	(France) Mickael Pascal	(France) Sabrina Jonnier

== Dual-slalom ==
Date	Venue	Winner (Men)	Winner (Women)
9 June 2001	(Slovenia) Maribor	(United States) Brian Lopes	(France) Anne-Caroline Chausson
16 June 2001	(France) Vars	cancelled due to rain	
7 July 2001	(Canada) Grouse Mountain	(United States) Brian Lopes	(United States) Leigh Donovan
14 July 2001	(United States) Durango	(United States) Brian Lopes	(United States) Leigh Donovan
28 July 2001	(Japan) Arai	(Australia) Wade Bootes	(United States) Leigh Donovan
4 August 2001	(Switzerland) Leysin	(United States) Brian Lopes	(Australia) Katrina Miller
11 August 2001	(Austria) Kaprun	(United States) Brian Lopes	(Australia) Katrina Miller
25 August 2001	(Canada) Mont Sainte-Anne	(United States) Eric Carter	(United States) Leigh Donovan
Final Standings	UCI World Cup; Dual-Slalom Championship	(United States) Brian Lopes	(United States) Leigh Donovan
Final Standings	UCI World Cup; Dual-Slalom Championship	(United States) Eric Carter	(Australia) Katrina Miller
Final Standings	UCI World Cup; Dual-Slalom Championship	(Switzerland) Mickael Deldycke	(United States) Tara Llanes

== See also ==
- 2001 UCI Mountain Bike & Trials World Championships
