= Thomas Frischknecht =

Swiss cyclist (born 1970)

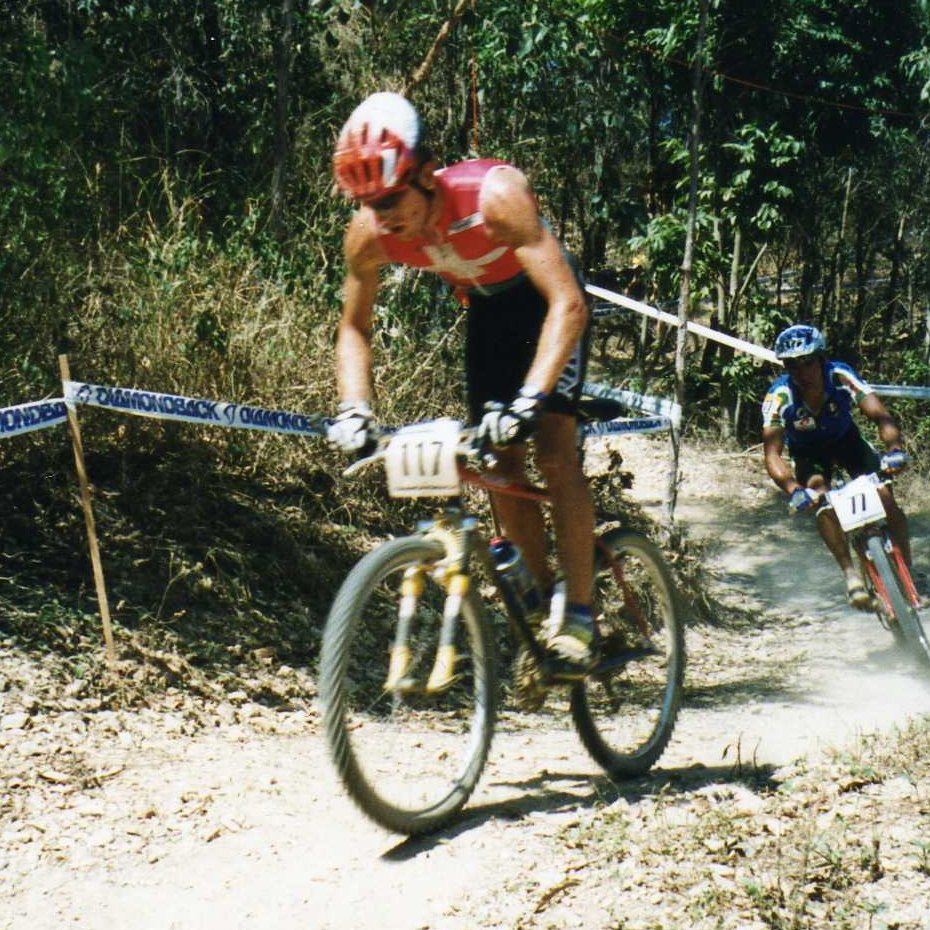
- Frischknecht in 1996

Personal information
- Full name: Thomas Frischknecht
- Nickname: Frischi
- Born: 17 February 1970 (age 56) Feldbach, Switzerland
- Height: 1.76 m (5 ft 9 in)
- Weight: 69 kg (152 lb)

Cycling career
- Sport: Cycling
- Current team: Retired
- Disciplines: MTB; Cyclo-cross
- Role: Rider

Professional teams
- 1990–2000: Ritchey
- 2001–2008: Swisspower

Major wins
- Cyclo-cross National Championships (1997, 1999, 2002) World Cup 1 individual win (1998–99) Mountain bike World XC Championships (1996) World Marathon Championships (2003, 2005) National XC Championships (1994, 1996–1998) XC World Cup (1992, 1993, 1995) 17 individual wins (1992–1999, 2001)
Medal record
Representing Switzerland
Men's mountain bike racing
Olympic Games
Silver medal – second place	1996 Atlanta	Cross-country
World Championships
Gold medal – first place	1996 Cairns	Cross-country
Gold medal – first place	2003 Lugano	Marathon
Gold medal – first place	2005 Lillehammer	Marathon
Silver medal – second place	1990 Durango	Cross-country
Silver medal – second place	1991 Ciocco	Cross-country
Silver medal – second place	1992 Bromont	Cross-country
Silver medal – second place	2001 Vail	Cross-country
Bronze medal – third place	2002 Kaprun	Cross-country
Bronze medal – third place	2004 Les Gets	Cross-country
Men's cyclo-cross
World Championships
Silver medal – second place	1997 Munich	Elite

Thomas Frischknecht (born 17 February 1970 in Feldbach, Switzerland) is a former Swiss mountain bike and cyclo-cross racer, often called Europe's Elder Statesman of mountain biking, because of his extraordinarily long career at the top level of the sport. A professional since 1990, he was on top of the Mountain Bike World Championship podium for the first time in 1996 and most recently in 2004.

== Biography ==
Frischi (as he is called) advocates staying 'fit for life' and dope free racing. He is considered an excellent example of a clean sportsman.

In 1996 he was second at the World Cross-country Mountain Bike Championships, but after France's Jérôme Chiotti confessed having used EPO when he won the title that year, he got the rainbow jersey from Chiotti, handed over as a friendly act in an unofficial ceremony.

He won the Olympic silver medal in 1996. The next day he competed in the men's road race on a Ritchey cyclocross bike after fellow Swiss team member Tony Rominger fell ill. He finished the race in the middle of the pack.

Frischknecht also competes in cyclo-cross, where he won an Amateur World Champion title, was Vice World Champion in 1997 and is a multiple-time Swiss Champion.

Thomas first traveled to America in 1990 to compete in the then new genre of mountain biking. He became closely linked to Tom Ritchey, a major bike-components producer, who provided support and became a mentor and a good friend. Ritchey has sponsored him ever since. Ritchey's Swiss Cross frame draws its name from Fischknecht. Other major sponsors include Swisspower, an electric utility consortium, and Scott bicycles.

Frischknecht was author of a book on mountain biking, Richtig Mountainbiken. He is currently involved with the Frischi Bike School in the Engadin/St. Moritz area of Switzerland.

== Major results ==
=== Mountain bike ===
1990
2nd Cross-country, UCI World Championships
2nd Overall XC World Cup
1991
2nd Cross-country, UCI World Championships
3rd Cross-country, UEC European Championships
1992
1st Overall XC World Cup

1st Mont-Sainte-Anne
1st Landgraaf
1st Strathpeffer
1st Mount Snow
2nd Hunter Mountain

2nd Cross-country, UCI World Championships
1993
1st Cross-country, UEC European Championships
1st Overall XC World Cup

1st Barcelona
1st Mount Snow
2nd Bassano del Grappa
2nd Mont-Sainte-Anne
3rd Bromont

1994
1st Cross-country, National Championships
UCI XC World Cup

1st Mount Snow
1st Mont-Sainte-Anne
2nd Madrid
3rd Lenzerheide

1995
1st Overall XC World Cup

1st Vail
1st Mammoth Lakes
2nd Houffalize
3rd Cairns
3rd Budapest

1996
1st Cross-country, UCI World Championships
1st Cross-country, National Championships
2nd Overall UCI XC World Cup

1st Lisbon
1st Sankt Wendel
1st Kualoa Ranch
2nd Mount Helen
3rd Bromont

2nd Cross-country, Olympic Games
2nd Overall XC World Cup
1997
1st Cross-country, National Championships
UCI XC World Cup

1st Sankt Wendel

1998
1st Cross-country, National Championships
UCI XC World Cup

1st Budapest
3rd Napa Valley

3rd Cross-country, UEC European Championships
1999
UCI XC World Cup

1st Canmore

2000
UCI XC World Cup

2nd Lausanne

2001
UCI XC World Cup

1st Kaprun

2nd Cross-country, UCI World Championships
2002
2nd Cross-country, National Championships
3rd Cross-country, UCI World Championships
3rd Overall XC World Cup
2003
1st Marathon, UCI World Championships
UCI XC World Cup

2nd Kaprun

2004
3rd Cross-country, UCI World Championships
2005
1st Marathon, UCI World Championships
2nd Cross-country, National Championships
2017
1st Overall Mixed Cape Epic (with Jenny Rissveds)

=== Cyclo-cross ===
1987–1988
1st UCI World Junior Championships
1989–1990
Superprestige

1st Rome
3rd Zürich-Waid

1st Eschenbach
3rd UCI World Amateur Championships
1990–1991
1st UCI World Amateur Championships
1st Meilen
Superprestige

2nd Zarautz
2nd Wetzikon
3rd Rome
3rd Overijse

2nd Eschenbach
2nd Steinmaur
1991–1992
Superprestige

1st Overijse
1st Wetzikon
2nd Zarautz
3rd Harnes

1st Berlin
2nd Volketswil
2nd Muntelier
2nd Vossem
3rd UCI World Amateur Championships
3rd Eschenbach
3rd Leeds
1992–1993
2nd Overall Superprestige

1st Rome
2nd Plzeň
2nd Zarautz
2nd Overijse
2nd Asper-Gavere
2nd Zillebeke

1st Sankt-Gallen
1st Berlin
1st Liestal
1st Lyss
1st Gansingen
1st Dagmersellen
1st Solbiate Olona
2nd National Championships
2nd Brouilly
2nd Meilen
3rd Zürich
1993–1994
3rd Overall Superprestige

1st Asper-Gavere
1st Wetzikon
2nd Diegem
2nd Milan
2nd Westouter-Zillebeke

1st Berlin
2nd National Championships
2nd Sankt-Gallen
3rd Hombrechtikon
1994–1995
1st Dagmersellen
2nd Hombrechtikon
1995–1996
2nd Solbiate Olona
2nd Volketswil
2nd Sankt-Gallen
3rd National Championships
3rd Langenthal
3rd Dagmersellen
3rd Hombrechtikon
3rd Liestal
UCI World Cup

5th Pontchâteau

1996–1997
1st National Championships
1st Gansingen
2nd UCI World Championships
Superprestige

2nd Wetzikon

2nd Sankt-Gallen
2nd Uster
UCI World Cup

3rd Heerlen
4th Koksijde
4th Nommay

3rd Meilen
3rd Hombrechtikon
1997–1998
2nd Magstadt
2nd Volketswil
3rd National Championships
UCI World Cup

4th Solbiate Olona

1998–1999
1st National Championships
UCI World Cup

1st Zeddam
4th Nommay

1st Hombrechtikon
1st Meilen
1st Magstadt
2nd Rüti
3rd Uster
5th UCI World Championships
1999–2000
1st Liestal
1st Obergösgen
2nd National Championships
2nd Hittnau
2nd Hombrechtikon
2nd Dagmersellen
2000–2001
1st Magstadt
1st Safenwil
2nd Obergösgen
2nd Hombrechtikon
2001–2002
1st National Championships
1st Castelnuovo
1st Dagmersellen
2nd Obergösgen
2002–2003
1st Hittnau
1st Dagmersellen
1st Hombrechtikon
1st Rennen Russikon
2nd Meilen
2nd Zürich
3rd Frenkendorf
2003–2004
2nd National Championships
2nd Magstadt
2nd Frenkendorf
2nd Hittnau
2nd Rüti
2nd Steinmaur
3rd Uster
2004–2005
1st San Mateo I
1st San Mateo II
2nd Steinmaur
3rd Sint-Niklaas
3rd Rüti
3rd Dagmersellen
2005–2006
1st Magstadt
2nd Steinmaur
2006–2007
2nd Frenkendorf
2nd Rüti
3rd Dagmersellen
3rd Dübendorf
2007–2008
2nd National Championships
2nd Dagmersellen
2nd Dübendorf
3rd Schmerikon
2008–2009
1st Steinmaur

Olympic Games
Preceded by Stefan Schärer	Flagbearer for Switzerland; Sydney 2000	Succeeded by Roger Federer
