= David Vázquez (cyclist) =

Spanish mountain biker

Personal information
- Full name: David Vázquez López
- Born: 10 February 1979 (age 47) Cerdanyola del Vallès, Spain

Cycling career
- Sport: Cycling
- Discipline: Downhill
- Role: Rider

Professional teams
- 1998: Volvo–Cannondale
- 1999: Mountain Dew–Specialized
- 2000: Subaru–Specialized
- 2001–2002: Giant
- 2003–2007: MSC Bikes
- 2008–2009: Lapierre–DH–Saab Salomon

David Vázquez López (born 10 February 1979) is a Spanish former professional downhill mountain biker. He most notably won four rounds of the UCI Downhill World Cup in addition to placing second overall in 1998 and third in 2000. He also won the national championships in 2000, 2003, 2006 and 2007 and the European Championships in 2007.

== Major results ==
1997
1st European Junior Downhill Championships
2nd UCI Junior Downhill World Championships
2nd Nevegal, UCI Downhill World Cup
1998
2nd Overall UCI Downhill World Cup

1st Big Bear Lake
2nd Kaprun
2nd Stellenbosch
3rd Snoqualmie Pass

1999
4th UCI Downhill World Championships
2000
1st National Downhill Championships
3rd Overall UCI Downhill World Cup

1st Les Gets
3rd Kaprun

4th European Downhill Championships
2003
1st National Downhill Championships
4th European Downhill Championships
5th Overall UCI Downhill World Cup

1st Kaprun

2004
1st Calgary, UCI Downhill World Cup
2006
1st National Downhill Championships
2007
1st European Downhill Championships
1st National Downhill Championships
2nd Vigo, UCI Downhill World Cup
