= Downhill Domination =

2003 racing video game

- North American box art
- Developer: Incog Inc. Entertainment (Note: Santa Monica Studio assisted on development.)
- Publishers: NA: Sony Computer Entertainment; EU/AU: Codemasters
- Director: Scott Campbell
- Producers: Scott Campbell; Rick Kane
- Designer: Scott Campbell
- Programmer: Karl Loveridge
- Artist: Karl Loveridge
- Platform: PlayStation 2
- Release: NA: July 22, 2003; EU: February 13, 2004; AU: February 20, 2004
- Genres: Racing, vehicular combat
- Modes: Single-player, multiplayer

Downhill Domination is a racing video game developed by Incog Inc. Entertainment and published by Sony Computer Entertainment for the PlayStation 2. It was released in North America in 2003 and in Europe by Codemasters in 2004.

== Gameplay ==
There are three options available at the main menu: single-player, multiplayer, and an options menu that allows players to modify gameplay elements such as difficulty and view unlocked items achieved during gameplay.

Initially, the player is introduced to six fictional racers displayed at the top of a mountain once single-player mode is selected from the main menu. By pressing the select button over an unlocked racer, additional information about the racer will be displayed; pressing the select button over a locked character, represented by a statue, will show information on how to unlock the racer, typically by completing a specific career. In addition to two other fictional racers, players can also unlock real-life professional racers such as Eric Carter, Tara Llanes, Brian Lopes, Richie Schley, and Missy Giove by completing specific tournaments during gameplay.

Combat is also integrated into the game, allowing the player to use two buttons to attack other racers—one for a left attack and the other for a right. These attacks can be upgraded to more powerful versions by performing tricks, taking out opponents, or collecting power-ups (known in-game as "pickups"). A bike shop with several unlockable items to purchase is available but is only accessible in single-player mode. Up to four players can play the game, but when playing with more than two, the available tracks and modes are limited.

== Reception ==
Reception

Aggregate score
Aggregator	Score
Metacritic	79/100

Review scores
Publication	Score
Edge	6/10
Electronic Gaming Monthly	7.83/10
Famitsu	30/40
Game Informer	8.25/10
GamePro	4/5
GameRevolution	B
GameSpot	7.5/10
GameSpy	4/5
GameZone	8.5/10
IGN	8/10
Official U.S. PlayStation Magazine	4/5
Maxim	8/10
The Times	3/5

Downhill Domination received "generally favorable reviews" according to the review aggregation website Metacritic. In Japan, where the game was ported for release on May 20, 2004, under the name Bakusō Mountain Bikers (爆走マウンテンバイカーズ, Bakusō Maunten Baikāzu; lit. "Roaring Mountain Bikers"), Famitsu gave it a score of 30 out of 40.
