= 1990 UCI Mountain Bike World Championships =

Annual worldwide mountain biking competition

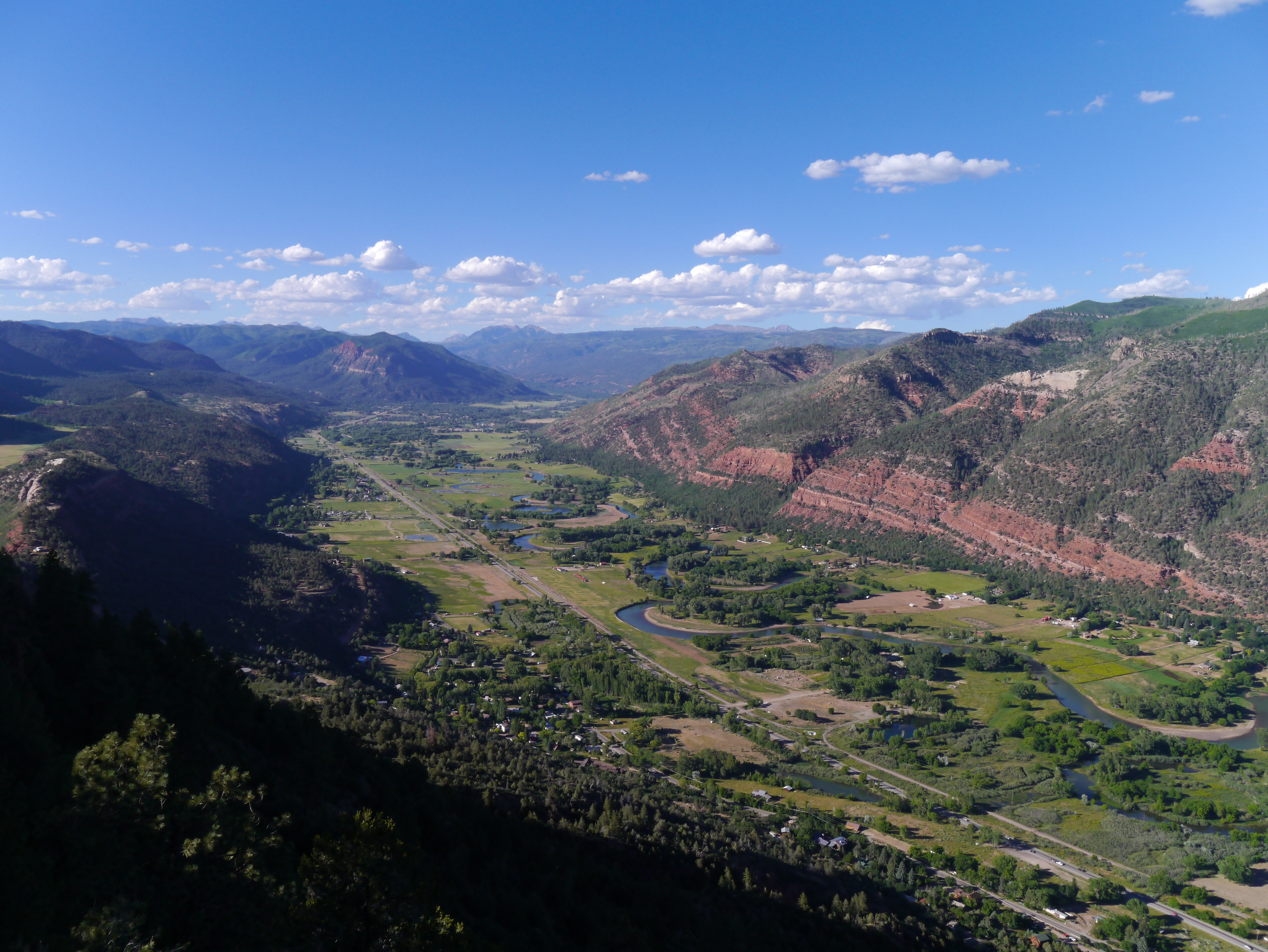
- Venue: Durango, United States
- Date: 14–15 September 1990

The 1990 UCI Mountain Bike World Championships were held in Durango, Colorado, United States. These were the first World Championships in mountain biking to be organised by the Union Cycliste Internationale (UCI). The disciplines included were cross-country and downhill.

Mountain biking world championships had been held since 1986, but without the sanction of the UCI. There had in fact been multiple 'world championships' before 1990, with the United States and Europe holding rival events and each crowning a 'world champion' in each discipline. The UCI decided to host its inaugural world championships in the United States as it was the birthplace of mountain biking. On the recommendation of the United States Cycling Federation, the UCI chose Durango to host the event.

== Medal summary ==
=== Men's events ===
Event	Gold	Silver	Bronze
Cross-country	Ned Overend (USA)	Thomas Frischknecht (SUI)	Tim Gould (GBR)
Downhill	Greg Herbold (USA)	Mike Kloser (USA)	Paul Thomasberg (USA)
Junior downhill	Joey Irwin (USA)	David Hemming (GBR)	Dwayne Norris (NZL)

=== Women's events ===
Event	Gold	Silver	Bronze
Cross-country	Juli Furtado (USA)	Sara Ballantyne (USA)	Ruthie Matthes (USA)
Downhill	Cindy Devine (CAN)	Elladee Brown (CAN)	Penny Davidson (USA)

=== Medal table ===
Rank	Nation	Gold	Silver	Bronze	Total
1	United States (USA)	4	2	3	9
2	Canada (CAN)	1	1	0	2
3	Great Britain (GBR)	0	1	1	2
4	Switzerland (SUI)	0	1	0	1
5	New Zealand (NZL)	0	0	1	1
Totals (5 entries)		5	5	5	15
