= Christophe Dupouey =

French cyclist

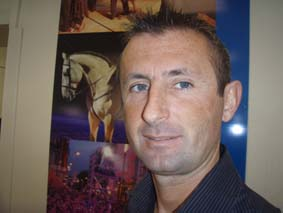
- Dupouey in 2008

Personal information
- Born: 8 August 1968 Tarbes, France
- Died: 4 February 2009 (aged 40) Tarbes, France

Cycling career
- Sport: Cycling
- Disciplines: Mountain bike Road
- Role: Rider
Medal record
Representing France
Men's mountain bike racing
World Championships
Gold medal – first place	1998 Mont Sainte-Anne	Cross-country
European Championships
Gold medal – first place	1996 Bassano del Grappa	Cross-country
Gold medal – first place	1998 Aywaille	Cross-country
Bronze medal – third place	1995 Špindlerův Mlýn	Cross-country

Christophe Dupouey (8 August 1968 – 4 February 2009) was a French mountain biker. In 1996, he won the gold medal in the men's cross country section of the UCI Mountain Bike World Cup. In 1998, he won the gold medal in the same section of the UCI Mountain Bike & Trials World Championships. Dupouey also competed in the 1996 and 2000 Summer Olympics, placing 4th in 1996. In 2000, riding Commencal's first-ever production bike, he finished first at the Roc d'Azur XC race; however, because he did not have an official race contract, his win was never officially recorded.

In 2006, he was given a suspended three-month prison sentence for participating in a trafficking network for "pot belge", a mix of cocaine, caffeine, pain killers, sometimes amphetamines, and heroin. Dupouey committed suicide on 4 February 2009 at the age of 40.
