= Marco Bui =

Italian cyclist

Marco Bui (born 17 October 1977) is an Italian professional mountain biker. Bui won the 2001 UCI Mountain Bike World Cup in the Cross-country time-trial. During that season he recorded two wins - one at Napa Valley and one at Houffalize.

Bui also represented Italy at the Olympics.
