= Juli Furtado =

American cyclist

Personal information
- Born: April 4, 1967 (age 59) New York City, New York, U.S.

Cycling career
- Sport: Cycling
- Current team: Retired
- Discipline: Mountain biking
- Role: Rider

Professional team
- USA Olympic Cycling Team: 1996

Major wins
- US National Road Championship (1989)
Medal record
Representing United States
World Mountain Bike Championships
Gold medal – first place	1990 Durango	Cross-country
Pan American Games
Silver medal – second place	1995 Mar del Plata	Mountain bike

Juliana "Juli" Furtado (born April 4, 1967, in New York City) is a retired American professional mountain biker, who began her sports career in skiing.

After knee injuries dashed her hopes of ski success, she took up cycling and won the US National Road Championship, and then went on to be very successful at mountain bike events - during her short 6-year career in MTB Furtado won five national titles and represented her country at the Olympics.

== Early life ==
Born on April 4, 1967, her father's parents were Portuguese from São Miguel Island. She started skiing at age two, and racing at age 9 after her family moved to Vermont, where Furtado attended the Stratton Mountain School.

At age 15 she became the youngest member of the U.S. National ski team, for which she competed from 1982 to 1987. After undergoing several knee operations, Furtado's hopes of competing in the Olympics were forced to an end, and she attended University of Colorado Boulder on a skiing scholarship, where she received her BA in marketing. While racing for CU her knee injuries forced her to retire from competitive skiing, and Juliana switched to cycling.

== Cycling ==
In 1989, her first year competing, Furtado won the US National Road Championship. She was then introduced to mountain biking, and in 1990, again her first year competing, she won the cross-country event (along with Ned Overend) in the first official Mountain Bike World Championship, held in Durango, Colorado. In 1992, she won the downhill world championship. In 1996, Furtado won both the World Cup (her 3rd WC championship) and the NORBA (U.S. National race authority) cross-country championships. She also participated in the Atlanta Olympics. Unfortunately, though she was the overwhelming favorite to win, she suffered in the severe Atlanta sun and heat due to the as yet undetected Lupus in her system and finished with an uncharacteristically slow 7th place. Soon after her Lupus was diagnosed, and again Furtado was forced into early retirement from her sport due to physical conditions. Her disease is currently under control, and she still rides.

== Women's bikes ==
After retiring, Furtado started a company to design and produce female specific MTB components, such as smaller diameter handlebars and grips, stems, and seats.

Her designs were eventually picked up by Santa Cruz Bikes. At the same time, Santa Cruz developed the first female-specific cross-country aluminum MTB called the "Juliana". Furtado became the director of grass-roots sponsorship and marketing for Santa Cruz Bicycles, in Santa Cruz, California. In 2013, Furtado developed the concept for turning the single Juliana frame and associated components into a complete line of fully outfitted women's mountain bikes, which would be a first for Santa Cruz, primarily a frame producer. The Juliana line has 5 models comprising one of the world's largest women's MTB ranges in the industry.

== Legacy ==
In 1998, the book Rugged Racer was written about Juliana's struggles and successes, overcoming injuries in pursuit of her dream to compete in the Olympics. Despite a short MTB career of 6 years, Juliana held a Guinness World Record for most career 1st-place finishes in MTB (male or female) and, at that time, her career total wins exceeded the combined total wins of the most successful man (Ned Overend) and next most successful woman.

She became the mother of a son in 2008 and is currently working again with the U.S. National ski team, as an advocate for retiring athletes.

Furtado was inducted into the Mountain Bike Hall of Fame in 1993 and the United States Bicycling Hall of Fame in 2005.
