= Jürgen Beneke =

German mountain biker

Personal information
- Born: 23 February 1972 (age 54)

Cycling career
- Sport: Cycling
- Discipline: Downhill
- Role: Rider

Jürgen Beneke (born 23 February 1972) is a German former professional downhill mountain biker. He most notably won the overall title for downhill racing at the 1993 UCI Mountain Bike World Cup, the first year it was held. He also finished second in 1994 and 1997 and won four rounds total in his career. He also won the national championships in 1994, 1995 and 1996. Since retiring, he moved to the United States and has continued to compete as an amateur in road and cyclo-cross racing. He also designed and created various bike hanging products which are available for purchase through is company: DaHÄNGER.
