= Greg Minnaar =

South African cyclist

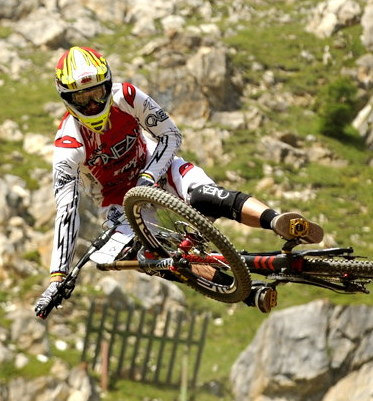
- Greg Minnaar at Val d'Isère (2012 World Cup 6th round)

Personal information
- Full name: Greg Minnaar
- Nickname: G.O.A.T.
- Born: 13 November 1981 (age 44) Pietermaritzburg, South Africa
- Height: 1.88 m (6 ft 2 in)
- Weight: 87 kg (192 lb)

Cycling career
- Sport: Cycling
- Current team: Norco Race Division
- Discipline: MTB
- Role: Rider
- Rider type: DH & 4X

Professional teams
- 1999: Local bike shop
- 2000: Animal Orange
- 2001–2002: Global Racing
- 2003: Haro Lee Dungarees
- 2004–2007: Team G Cross Honda
- 2008–2023: Santa Cruz Syndicate
- 2024-: Norco Factory Racing

Major wins
- UCI DH World Champion (4 Wins); UCI DH World Cup Overall (3 Wins); NORBA Champion (2 Wins)
Medal record
Men's mountain bike racing
Representing South Africa
World Championships
Gold medal – first place	2003 Lugano	Downhill
Gold medal – first place	2012 Leogang-Saalfelden	Downhill
Gold medal – first place	2013 Pietermaritzburg	Downhill
Gold medal – first place	2021 Val Di Sole	Downhill
Silver medal – second place	2004 Les Gets	Downhill
Silver medal – second place	2006 Rotorua	Downhill
Silver medal – second place	2009 Canberra	Downhill
Silver medal – second place	2015 Vallnord	Downhill
Bronze medal – third place	2001 Vail	Downhill
Bronze medal – third place	2005 Livigno	Downhill
Bronze medal – third place	2010 Mont-Sainte-Anne	Downhill

Greg Minnaar (born 13 November 1981) is a retired South African World Champion mountain bike racer competing in downhill cycling. He won four world championships. Minnaar is regarded as one of the most dominant DH racers ever, with a record 22 career victories and 86 podiums in 167 starts. Since retirement, he is the team manager for Norco Race Division.

== Career ==
Minnaar first began getting noticed as a world class downhill racer at the age of 17, in 1999, racing select World Cups (including one in his home country of South Africa, in Stellenbosch) on a local shop team, aboard a Kona Stab Dee-Lux bike with a Marzocchi Monster T. fork. In 2000, he was picked up as a junior by British international team Animal Orange, which used Orange frames (222 for downhill and Ms. Isle for dual slalom) and RockShox suspension. That year Greg podiumed at a World Cup points series race for the first time.

The following two years Greg rode for the Global Racing team, aboard similar bikes as the previous years, and on this team, at the age of 19, he won the overall World Cup points series in the Elite downhill. In 2003 Greg switched to the Haro Lee Dungarees team, which used Intense designed and built DHR frames for the downhill and their own short travel Werx trail bike frames for Four Cross, with Manitou suspension. It was aboard this team that, at the age of 21, Greg became World Champion of downhill.

In 2004, Greg was offered a spot on Team G Cross Honda, which used one-off internally geared frames made by Honda, with a Showa suspension. He accepted and stayed for four years, winning his second World Cup points series overall victory in 2005. The 2007 season ended on a bittersweet note with a dislocated and fractured shoulder early in his winning World Championship final run, although Greg got back on the bike to salvage a painful 4th-place finish. In addition, Greg was forced to switch teams yet again when Honda pulled out of the sport, and he chose the Santa Cruz Syndicate team, alongside riders Steve Peat, Nathan Rennie, and Josh Bryceland for the 2008 season.

Minnaar was appointed as a member of the inaugural UCI Athletes' Commission in 2011.

Minnaar's last race for Norco Factory Racing as the team captain for the 2024 UCI World Cup Downhill season.

After racing at the highest level for 25 years, Minnaar officially retired from World Cup racing 6 October 2024 at the final round of the UCI World Cup Downhill season in Mont-Sainte-Anne, Canada.

He continues to be involved in the sport as the director of the Norco Race Division.

=== UCI Downhill World Champions ===
Minnaar has won the UCI Downhill World Championship four times - in 2003, 2012, 2013, and 2021. He has finished second four times (2004, 2006, 2009, and 2015) and taken the bronze three times (2001, 2005, and 2010).

=== Downhill World Cup ===
Minnaar has been crowned Downhill World Cup champion three times (2001, 2005 and 2008) for winning the Mountain Bike World Cup points series. He was also crowned Downhill World Champion in 2003 for winning the season ending event. He has also done well in the Four Cross event, with one win in the 2003 World Cup points series, in Fort William, Scotland, and a fourth-place finish at the 2005 World Championships.

In the 2008 World Cup, Minnaar podiumed at every one of the seven events in the series, taking the win at Fort William, Mont-Sainte-Anne and Canberra. This gave him a comfortable lead going into the finals at Schladming, Austria, where he placed fifth and clenched his overall lead to take the well-deserved title.

In the 2009 World Cup series, Minnaar took first place at Pietermaritzburg South Africa, Fort William Scotland and Bromont Canada. He also came 6th at La Bresse in France, 3rd at Vallnord in Andorra, Maribor in Slovenia and in Schladming Austria. Greg also came 22nd in Mont-Sainte-Anne leaving him with a 2nd place overall. In the World Championships at Canberra Australia he lost the 1st place to his teammate Steve Peat by 0.05 seconds.

In the 2015 World Cup series, Minnaar took first place at Lenzerheide, Switzerland, earning him his 18th career win and setting the record for most world cup wins in the history of downhill racing. Until this victory, Minnaar had shared the record for most overall world cup race wins with Santa Cruz Syndicate teammate Steve Peat, after a victory earlier in the 2015 season.

=== NORBA (USA Cycling) ===
Minnaar was twice (2003, 2004) crowned champion of the NORBA (now USA Cycling) points series.

== Results ==
1998
1st DH, South African National Mountain Biking Championships

1999
1st DH, All African National Mountain Biking Championships

2000
5th DH, UCI Mountain Bike World Cup, Vail, United States

2001
1st DH, UCI Mountain Bike World Cup, Kaprun, Austria
1st DH, UCI Mountain Bike World Cup, Series Overall
3rd DH, UCI Mountain Bike & Trials World Championships, Vail, United States

2002
3rd 4X, UCI Mountain Bike World Cup, Telluride, United States

2003
1st DH, UCI Mountain Bike & Trials World Championships, Lugano, Switzerland
1st NORBA, Series Overall

2004
2nd DH, UCI Mountain Bike & Trials World Championships, Les Gets, France
1st NORBA, Series Overall

2005
1st DH, UCI Mountain Bike World Cup, Series Overall
3rd DH, UCI Mountain Bike & Trials World Championships, Livigno, Italy

2006
2nd DH, UCI Mountain Bike & Trials World Championships, Rotorua, New Zealand
3rd DH, UCI Mountain Bike World Cup, Series Overall

2007
4th DH, UCI Mountain Bike & Trials World Championships, Fort William, Scotland

^{rode half the race with a broken scapular and dislocated shoulder}

2008
1st DH, UCI Mountain Bike World Cup, Series Overall

^{podium every single round}

2009
1st DH, UCI Mountain Bike World Cup, Pietermaritzburg, South Africa; Fort William, Scotland; Bromont, Canada
2nd DH, UCI Mountain Bike & Trials World Championships, Canberra, Australia

2010
2nd DH, UCI Mountain Bike World Cup, Series Overall
3rd DH, UCI Mountain Bike & Trials World Championships, Mont-Sainte-Anne, Canada

2011
2nd DH, UCI Mountain Bike World Cup, Pietermaritzburg, South Africa
1st DH, UCI Mountain Bike World Cup, Fort William, Scotland
1st DH, UCI Mountain Bike World Cup, La Bresse, France

2012
1st DH, UCI Mountain Bike World Cup, Pietermaritzburg, South Africa
1st DH, UCI Mountain Bike & Trials World Championships, Leogang, Austria

2013
1st DH, UCI Mountain Bike & Trials World Championships, Pietermaritzburg, South Africa
3rd DH, UCI Mountain Bike World Cup, Series Overall

2016
4th DH, UCI Mountain Bike World Cup, Series Overall
1st DH, UCI Mountain Bike World Cup, Fort William, Scotland

3rd DH, UCI Mountain Bike World Cup, Lenzerheide, Switzerland
2nd DH, UCI Mountain Bike World Cup, Vallnord, Andorra

2017
3rd DH, UCI Mountain Bike World Cup, Series Overall
1st DH, UCI Mountain Bike World Cup, Fort William, Scotland
3rd DH, UCI Mountain Bike World Cup, Leogang, Austria
2nd DH, UCI Mountain Bike World Cup, Vallnord, Andorra
1st DH, UCI Mountain Bike World Cup, Lenzerheide, Switzerland

2019
2nd DH, UCI Mountain Bike World Cup, Leogang, Austria
2nd DH, UCI Mountain Bike World Cup, Lenzerheide, Switzerland

2021
1st DH, UCI Mountain Bike and Trials World Championships, Val di Sole, Italy

== See also ==
- Danny Hart (cyclist) joined the Norco Race Division in 2025
- Erice van Leuven joined the Norco Race Division in 2025
- Steve Peat, Minnaar's former teammate on the Santa Cruz Syndicate Team
