= Annabella Stropparo =

Italian cyclist

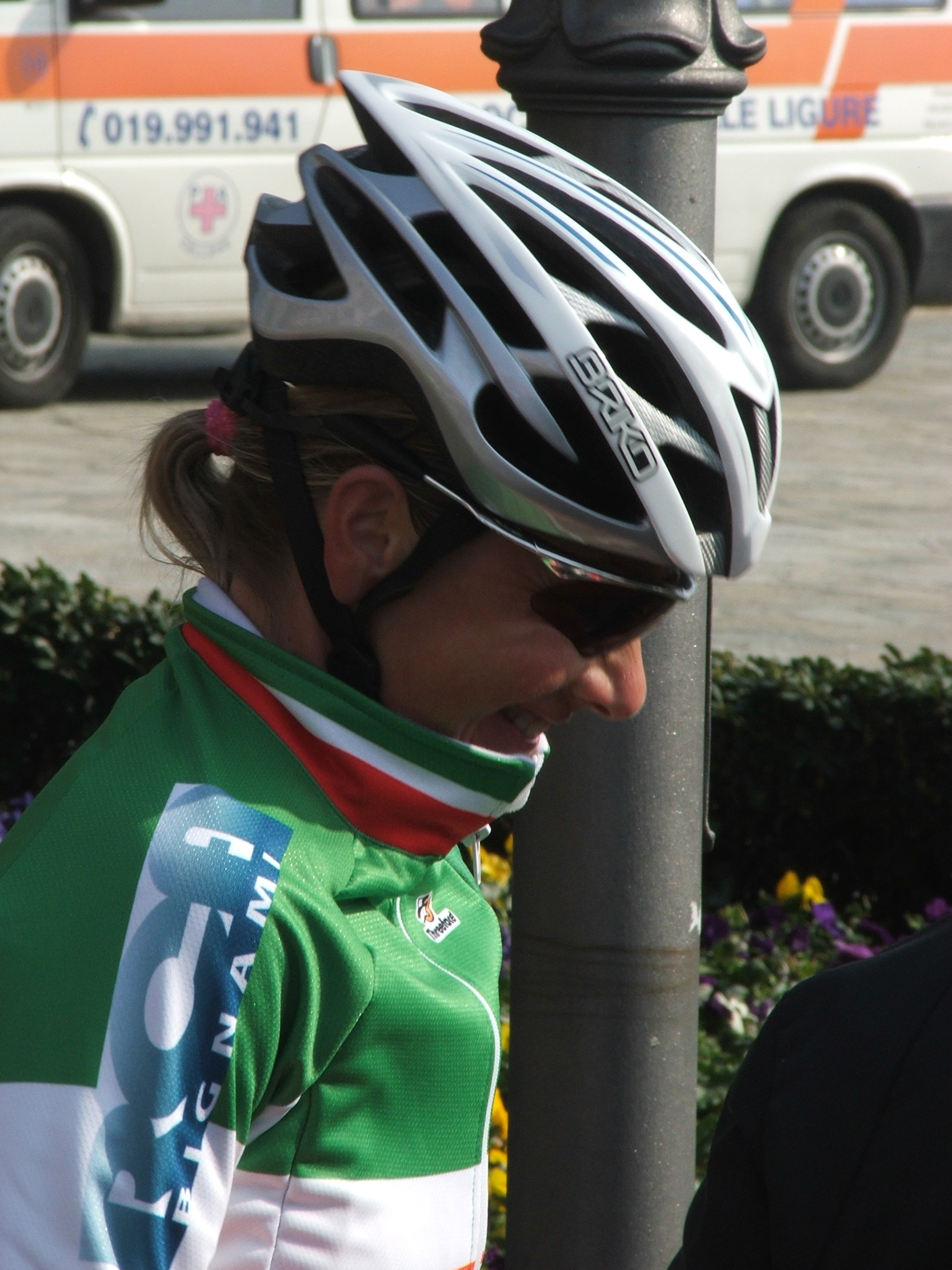
- Annabella Stropparo in 2008

Personal information
- Born: 4 July 1968 (age 58)

Cycling career
- Sport: Cycling

Annabella Stropparo (born 4 July 1968) is an Italian former cyclist. She competed in the women's cross-country event at the 1996 Summer Olympics.
