= Tara Llanes =

American-Canadian bicycle motocross rider and wheelchair basketball player (born 1976)

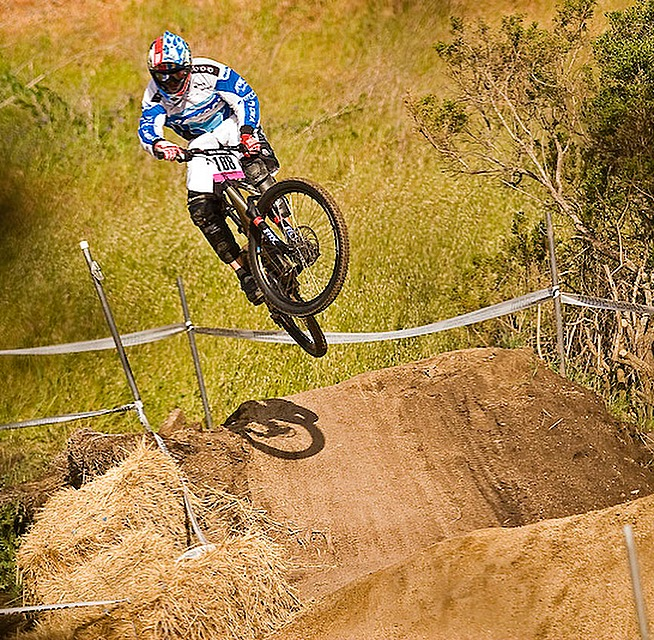
- Llanes jumping doubles at Sea Otter Classic DH race

Personal information
- Full name: Tara Janelle Llanes
- Nickname: T or T-Rock
- Born: November 28, 1976 (age 49) West Covina, California, U.S.
- Height: 5 ft 4 in (1.63 m)
- Weight: 108 lb (49 kg)

Cycling career
- Sport: Cycling
- Disciplines: Bicycle Motocross (BMX); Mountain bike racing (MTB)
- Role: Racer
- Rider type: BMX: Off road MTB: Cross-country, downhill

Amateur teams
- 1989–1990: Aussie Wear
- 1990–1991: Haro/Crupi
- 1991–1994: Haro Factory Team
- 1994–1996: Rotech

Professional teams
- 1997-2000: Team Specialized / Mt. Dew
- 2000–2002: Yeti/Pearl Izumi
- 2002–2007: Giant Bicycles/Pearl Izumi

Major wins
- USA national champion 4X (2004); USA national champion downhill (2006)
Medal record
Women's wheelchair basketball
Representing Canada
World Championship
Silver medal – second place	2026 Ottawa	Team
Commonwealth Games
Gold medal – first place	2022 Birmingham	3x3
Parapan American Games
Gold medal – first place	2019 Lima	Team
Silver medal – second place	2023 Santiago	Team

Tara Janelle Llanes (born November 28, 1976) is a former Bicycle Motocross (BMX) and mountain bike (MTB) racer, and a wheelchair basketball player. Her prime competitive years in BMX were between 1990 to 1993. She went on to became a national champion MTB racer and later played wheelchair tennis and wheelchair basketball for Canada. Her surname is pronounced "Yaw-ness" but for obvious reasons it is often mispronounced "lanes" as in the type of division of a pathway.

== BMX racing career milestones ==
Note: Professional first are on the national level unless otherwise indicated.

Milestone	Event details
Started Racing:	In February 1988 at 11 years old. Her mother took her to a BMX race after she repeatedly asked to stop and watch one at the Orange "Y" BMX track one weekend and she started racing the following weekend. Her name first appears in the Girls California District 3 (CA-03) listing for February 1988 in the May 1988 issue of American BMXer. She had only 4 points, indicating a last place finish in her first race.
Sanctioning body:	American Bicycle Association (ABA)
Sanctioning body district(s):	ABA: California District 3 (CA-3) 1988-1995
First race bike:	CW Racing.
First race result:	3rd place
First win (local):	
First sponsor:	Aussie Wear, early April 1989
First national win:	In 12 Girls at the ABA Supernationals in Jenks, Oklahoma, on June 24, 1989 (Day 1)
Turned Professional:	1996 in Mountain Biking. By that time she had retired from BMX competition, doing so in 1994, but in hopes of making the 2008 Summer Olympics US BMX Team she had returned to BMX competition in late 2006 racing in the NBL/UCI's Elite Women division.
First Professional race result:	Fourth place in Women's Elite at the National Bicycle League Silver State National in Las Vegas, Nevada, on November 4, 2006. She had previously turned pro in mountain Bike racing. This was her first race back in BMX competition with an intent to qualify for the then upcoming 2008 Summer Olympics in Beijing, China.
First Professional win:	None in BMX.
First Junior Women* race result:	None. Went directly to Elite Women after return to BMX racing.
First Junior Women win:	See "First Junior Women Pro race result"
First Senior Pro/Elite Women** race result:	See "First Professional race result."
First Senior Pro/Elite Women win:	None.
Height and weight at height of her career (1990–1993):	Ht:5'4" Wt:125 lbs (approximately).

Retired: Originally in 1995 to focus on Mountain Bike racing full time. She restarted in late 2006 with an eye toward making the 2008 Olympic Team. See "First professional race result". According to Llanes USA Cycling asked her tor restart her BMX career:

"USA Cycling approached me and said 'Now that it's an Olympic event do think (sic) you'd want to try try (sic) and compete...' and I said no. They kept talking to me, talking to me, until I entered a race and got fourth with the fastest girls that were there. So that had me rethinking things."

However, an apparent career-ending injury in MTB eliminated that possibility for 2008. She has however, stated her goal to be to return to racing competition.

*In the NBL Junior Women; No comparable level existed in the ABA.
**In the NBL it was/is Supergirls/Elite Women; in the ABA it is Pro Girls.

=== Career factory and major bike shop sponsors ===
Note: This listing only denotes the racer's primary sponsors. At any given time a racer could have numerous ever changing co-sponsors. Primary sponsorships can be verified by BMX press coverage and sponsor's advertisements at the time in question. When possible exact dates are used.

==== Amateur/Junior Women ====
- Aussie Wear Early April 1989-December 1990
- Haro Designs: December 1990-December 1991 The ABA Silverdollar nationals in Reno, Nevada, held on January 12, 1991, was Llanes's first race for Haro/Crupi.
- Haro/Crupi: December 1991-December 1994

==== Professional/Elite Women ====
- Giant Bicycles/Pearl Izumi: 2006–Present

=== Career bicycle motocross titles ===
Note: Listed are District, State/Provincial/Department, Regional, National and International titles. Only sanctioning bodies that were active during the racer's career are listed.

==== Amateur/Junior Women ====
National Bicycle League (NBL)

- 1992 15 Girls Grandnational Champion

American Bicycle Association (ABA)

- 1989 12 Girls and 12 & Under Girls Cruiser National No.2
- 1990 California District 3 (CA-3) Girls No.1
- 1990 13 Girls Grand National Champion
- 1990 13 Girls National No.1
- 1991 and 1992 CA-3 Girls Cruiser No.1

=== BMX press magazine interviews and articles ===
- "1990 District Number Ones" One of several profiles of the ABA's 1990 district number ones written in an autobiographical tense.

== Mountain Bike Career Record ==
In 1993 while still racing BMX for Haro Bicycles, she asked that sponsor for a mountain bike and to go to a mountain bike race. She liked it and soon transitioned from BMX to MTB, with cross country and dual slalom, and after dual slalom was abolished by NORBA the four-cross downhill events. During her mountain bike years she acquired the nickname of "T", the first letter of her given name. Unlike in BMX she turned pro in 1996. She almost immediately started doing well on the pro circuit but it was not until 1999 that she won her first title. In the now discontinued dual slalom downhill event of that year's ESPN Winter Extreme Games (also known Winter "X" Games), Tara took a gold medal. She would go on to win a further 14 medals in the next seven years of her career including five championships. During this time she also suffered numerous injuries including punctured lungs and a broken foot. Then in September 2007, the most devastating of all: a crash that left her paralyzed from the waist down.

== Mountain Bike career milestones ==
Started racing: According to her website In 1993 at 16 years old. She asked the BMX team manager of Haro Designs who was sponsoring her repeatedly to try it and he finally relented. but in a May 2007 Mountain Bike Action interview it was Haro Bicycles that asked her to give it a try.

Sub Discipline(s): Downhill, Four-Cross, Dual Slalom and Cross Country

First race result: According to Llanes's website. First in Junior Women in Dual Slalom at the Big Bear Lake, California. According to her Mountain Bike Action May 2000 interview it was a 2nd place in Junior Women in Dual Slalom at the 1993 NORBA Finals at Mammouth Mountain Resort in Mammoth Lakes, California.

Sanctioning body: National Off-Road Bicycle Association (NORBA)

Turned Professional: 1996

Retired: Her career has been on hold since her paralyzing injury suffered at the Jeep King of the Mountain finals event in Beaver Creek, Colorado, on September 1, 2007.

=== Career MTB factory and major Non-factory sponsors ===
Note: This listing only denotes the racer's primary sponsors. At any given time a racer could have numerous co-sponsors. Primary sponsorships can be verified by MTB press coverage and sponsor's advertisements at the time in question. When possible exact dates are given.

==== Amateur/Junior Women ====
- Haro Bicycles: 1994-1996
- Rotech: 1996-December 1997 She turned pro with this sponsor

==== Professional/Elite Women ====
- Rotech: 1996-December 1997
- Specialized: December 1997-December 2000
- Yeti/Pearl Izumi: December 2000-October 2002 The Yeti/Pearl Izumi team was dissolved after the 2002 season.
- Giant Bicycles/Pearl Izumi: December 2002–Present Despite her devastating injury Giant Bicycles renewed her contract and they will be working with her on her efforts to recover.

=== Career Mountain Bike Racing (MTB) titles ===
==== Amateur/Junior Women ====
National Off-Road Bicycle Association (NORBA)

- 1995 Junior National Downhill Champion

USA Cycling

==== Professional/Elite Women ====
ESPN Extreme (X) Games:

- 1999 Biker X Winter X Games Champion (Gold Medal)

Union Cycliste Internationale (UCI)

- 1999 Bronze Medal Dual Slalom World Cup Champion
- 2000 Silver Medal Dual Slalom World Cup Champion
- 2001 Bronze Medal Dual Slalom World Cup Champion
- 2000 Dual Silver Medal World Champion
- 2001 Dual Bronze Medal World Champion
- 2001 4-Cross World Cup Champion
- 2004, 2005 4-Cross Bronze Medal World Champion
- 2004 4-Cross Silver Medal World Cup Champion
- 2006 4-Cross Bronze Medal World Cup Champion

National Off-Road Bicycle Association (NORBA)

- 2002 Dual Slalom National Champion
- 2002, 2004 U.S. National 4-Cross Champion
- 2006 National Downhill Champion

USA Cycling

- 2006 National Champion.

=== Significant MTB injuries ===
- Broke Collar Bone in 1996 at Washington National.
- Broke Collar Bone in the Downhill at the UCI World Cup Canmore, Alberta, Canada on the weekend of July 3–4, 1999. She came back only a few weeks after the accident, albeit she missed two World Cup events during her lay up.
- She suffered two concussions in 2000.
- She suffered numerous injuries during a practice run at the NORBA mountain cross race on Chapman Hill in Durango, Colorado, on August 3, 2002. She crashed on one of the very large double jumps. She suffered a broken left collarbone, three fractured ribs, two partially collapsed lungs one of which was severely bruised, a torn MCL in her right knee.
- Suffered a broken left foot in an automobile accident on June 16, 2003, on a road in Pennsylvania. She was traveling in the Giant Team truck a Ford F350 which was towing the 30-foot (9.1 m) team trailer on her way to Vermont for the third stop in the NORBA NCS series. Rescue had to cut Tara out of the vehicle. Three other occupants in the automobile Jared Rando and Dustin Adams had only minor scrapes. The team mechanic, Matt Duniho who was driving needed stitches. Llanes's foot got jammed under the seat in front of her breaking it. She went to the hospital to be treated and flew back to Southern California the next day while her teammates continued onto Vermont in the team's backup vehicle. Llanes said of her injury:

“I went back to my foot specialist and he looked over the CT Scan,”she wrote. “It looks as though it's just the one bone in my foot. The cuneiform2 and 3 bone. I also told him my two smaller toes were hurting pretty badso he x-rayed them again and sure enough they were both broken. Not that it makes much of a difference. They were aligned just fine so he didn't'have to reset anything. It will still take 4-6 weeks."

==== 2007 Spinal cord injury ====
On September 1, 2007, Llanes crashed at Beaver Creek, Colorado, host to the Jeep King of the Mountain Finale. The accident happened on the second to last straight down the Dual Slalom course as she raced head-to-head against Jill Kintner in the semifinals. Llanes hit an obstacle wrong and the bicycle landed nose first on the ground. She was thrown over the handlebars and onto her head and then landed on her back, suffering massive and severe lower back trauma, suffering a C-7 fracture and L-1 damage to her vertebrae, and paralyzing her lower extremities. She was first rushed to Vail Valley Medical Center and then was airlifted to Denver Health Hospital. She underwent seven hours of surgery but still had no feeling from the waist down. According to the surgeons who worked on her, the condition is most likely permanent. Llanes recalls the moment of the accident:

"This was my job and I was blessed. Then my life and everything I had dreamed of and accomplished flashed before my eyes as I laid there on the ground trying to understand why I was in such pain and why my legs just wouldn't move."

Llanes continues to undergo intensive rehabilitation and as of late 2008 she could move her left leg. Her stated goal is to get back into competitive racing again. As she stated in an interview with pedalpushersonline.com:

PPO: "You seem so positive to me and so gung ho. What drives you? Is it just in you?"
Tara: "I think it just all has to do with me wanting to walk again. When this happened I was completely devastated. I mean, this has been my life since I was 11-years-old. This is what I know and it's what I love. It's what I absolutely, without a doubt love. I mean, not being able to ride my bike again for the rest of my life... It would crush me. And so for me, I can't have a negative thought in my mind. I can't because you know doctors can come in, and they can walk in... and say, "you're never going to walk again." But, you know what, to me so much of it is mind over matter. They do a test the first week that you're here in Craig and in the test they deemed me "complete". What complete means is that basically you're not going to walk again. You know what? My legs have started to move again, especially my left leg. One of my doctors was like, "holy shit!". I said, "you can take your 'complete' and shove it!" Not to her of course..."

== Wheelchair basketball ==
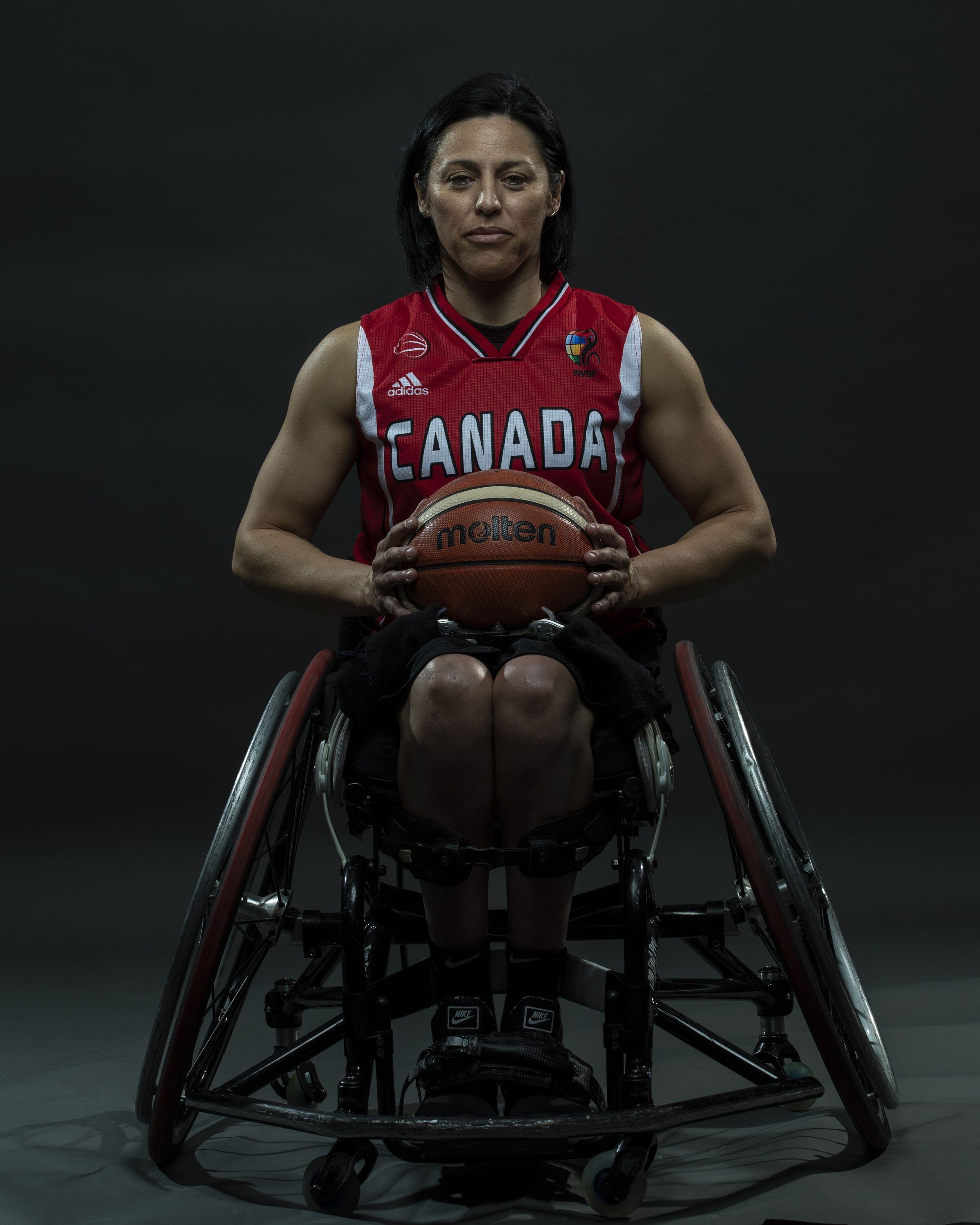
Michael P. Hall Photo / WBC

Llanes took a new career selling adaptive mountain bikes, and began playing wheelchair tennis. She met Amanda Yan who suggested that she might try wheelchair basketball. Her friend, Richard Peter encouraged this, in the belief that it would improve her performance on the tennis court. She took up the sport in 2016, playing for the BC Royals and BC Breakers, and two years later was chosen as part of the Canadian national team for the 2018 Wheelchair Basketball World Championship in Hamburg, Germany.

Llanes was a member of the Canadian women's wheelchair basketball team at the Paralympic Games in 2020 and 2024. She won medals with the Canadian team at the Parapan American Games in 2019 and 2023.

== Media appearances ==
Llanes was featured as one of the five real-life professional riders unlockable in the 2003 PlayStation 2 racing game Downhill Domination, alongside Eric Carter, Richie Schley, Missy Giove, and Brian lopes.

== Personal life ==
Llanes came out as a lesbian at age 17.

== See also ==
Motocross World Championship
