= Barbara Blatter =

Swiss Olympic mountain biker (born 1970)

Personal information
- Born: 22 December 1970 (age 55) Wattwil, Switzerland

Cycling career
- Sport: Cycling
- Discipline: Mountain bike racing
- Role: Rider
- Rider type: Cross-country
Medal record
Women's mountain bike racing
Representing Switzerland
Olympic Games
Silver medal – second place	2000 Sydney	Cross-country

Barbara Blatter (born 22 December 1970) is a Swiss mountain biker. She won the silver medal in Mountainbike in 2000 Summer Olympics.
