= Nathan Rennie =

Australian racing cyclist (born 1981)

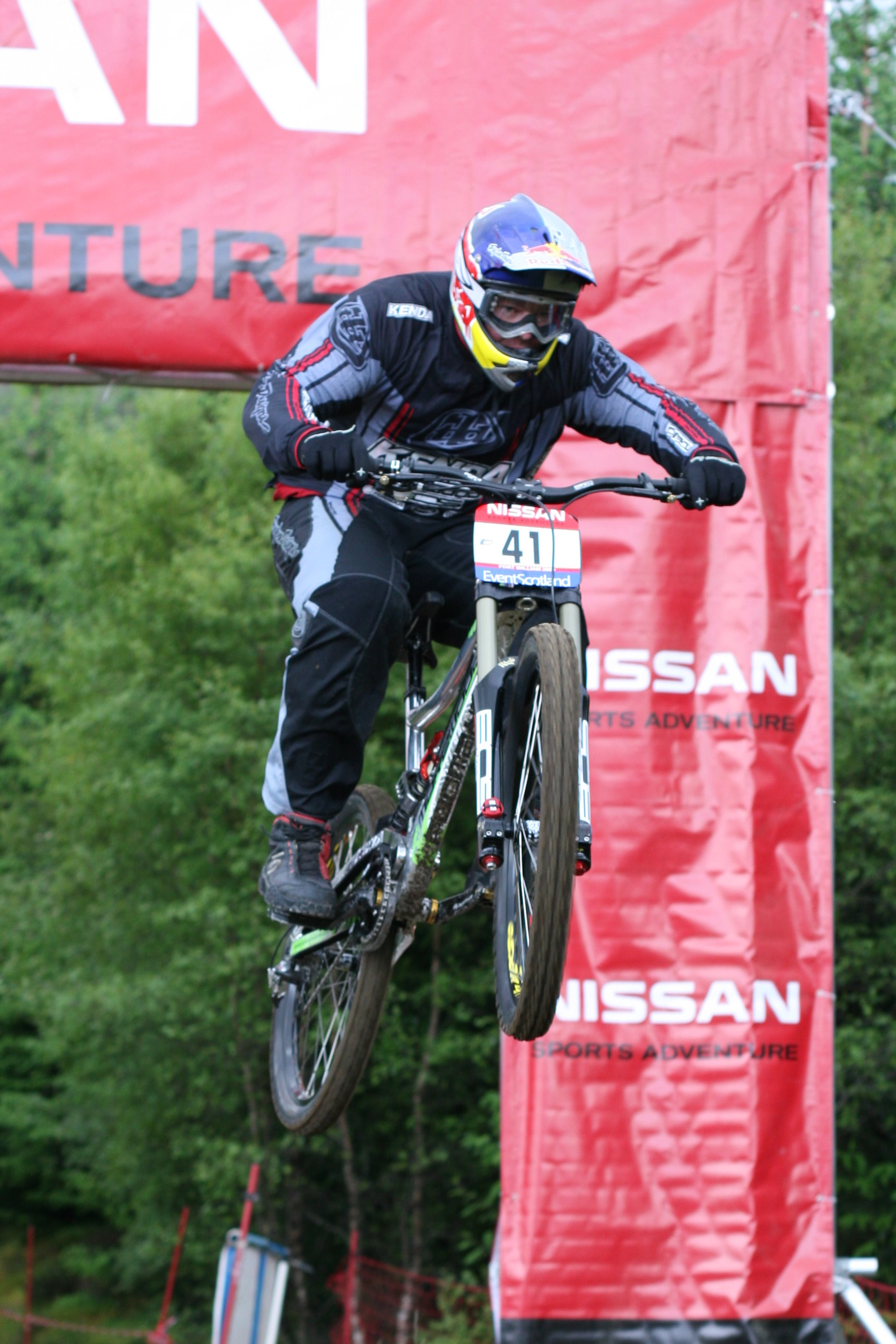
- Nathan Rennie (2009)

Personal information
- Born: 31 May 1981 (age 45) Penrith, NSW, Australia
- Height: 191 cm (6 ft 3 in)
- Weight: 108 kg (238 lb)

Cycling career
- Sport: Cycling
- Current team: Retired
- Discipline: Downhill mountain biking
- Role: Professional rider

Professional teams
- Avanti
- GT
- Yeti
- Ironhorse
- Santa Cruz Syndicate

Major wins
- 5x Australian Elite Downhill Champion; 1999 Junior World Champion; 2003 Overall World Cup Champion; 2003 World Cup Round Win; 2004 Bronze Downhill World Championships; 2006 Bronze Downhill World Championships; 1998 Bronze Junior Downhill World Championships; Over 20 World Cup Podiums
Medal record
Representing Australia
Men's mountain bike racing
World Championships
Gold medal – first place	1999 Åre	Junior downhill
Bronze medal – third place	2006 Rotorua	Downhill

Nathan Rennie (born 31 May 1981) is an Australian professional downhill mountain bike racer. He started riding at the age of 5. He was junior downhill world champion in 1999 and won the bronze medal in the elite category at the 2006 world championships. In the UCI Mountain Bike World Cup, Rennie won the downhill category overall in 2003 and came third in 2004 and 2005. In 2008, he was Australian national downhill champion. In 2020, Rennie was inducted into the Mountain Bike Hall of Fame.

In 2006, Rennie attempted to break the World Record Distance Jump Record on a bike (towed); he cleared 121.2 feet (36.9 metres).
