= Jared Rando =

Australian downhill mountain biker

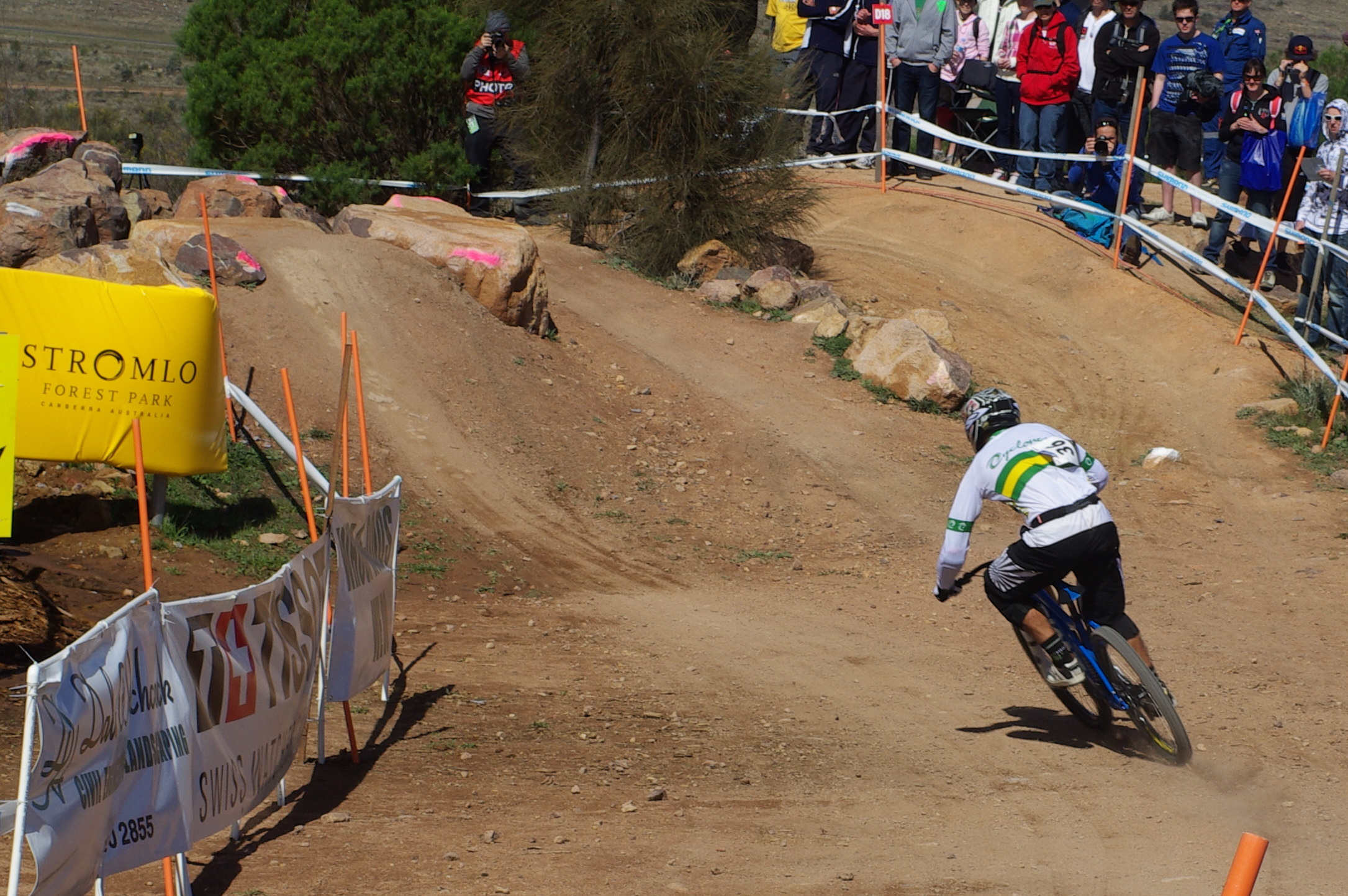
Jared Rando in a timed session at the 2009 world championships in Canberra, Australia.

Jared Rando (born 1981) is an Australian downhill mountain biker, signed to Giant Bicycles. Rando has competed at every UCI Mountain Bike & Trials World Championships from 1999 to 2009, participating in both downhill and fourcross events. At the 2009 championships, he finished 16th, 6 seconds behind winner Steve Peat. Previous highlights include 1st at the 2006 Australian mountain bike championships, and 1st in the 2001 Oceania mountain bike championships.
