= Missy Giove =

American mountain biker

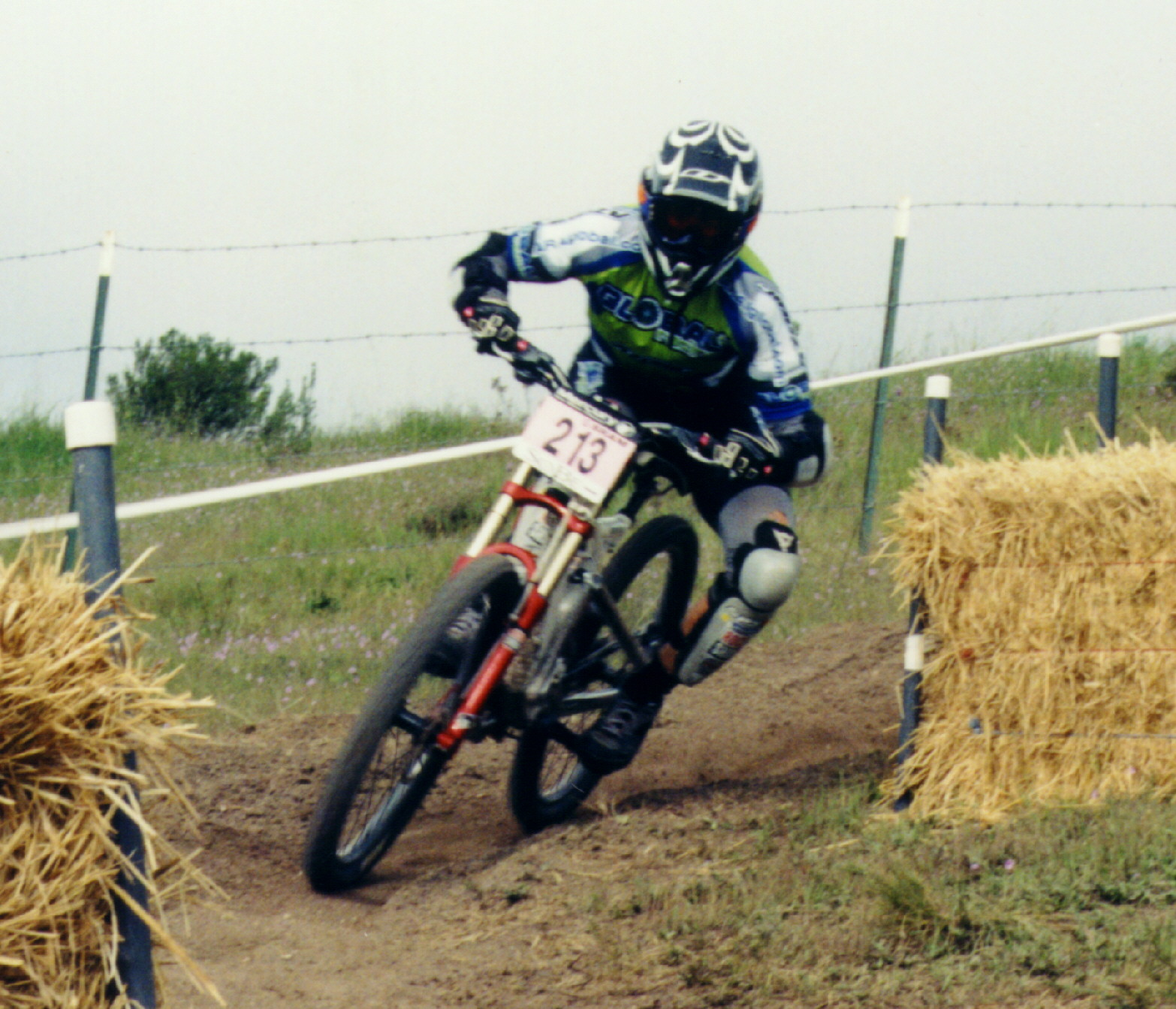

Personal information
- Full name: Melissa Giove
- Nickname: 'The Missile'
- Born: January 20, 1972 (age 54) New York City, New York, U.S.
Medal record
Women's mountain bike racing
Representing the United States
World Championships
Gold medal – first place	1994 Vail, Colorado USA	Downhill (DH)
Bronze medal – third place	1993 Métabief, France	Downhill (DH)
Bronze medal – third place	1996 Cairns, Australia	Downhill (DH)
Bronze medal – third place	2002 Kaprun, Austria	Downhill (DH)
World Cup
Gold medal – first place	1996	Downhill (DH)
Gold medal – first place	1997	Downhill (DH)
Silver medal – second place	1998	Downhill (DH)
Silver medal – second place	1999	Downhill (DH)
Silver medal – second place	2000	Downhill (DH)
Silver medal – second place	2001	Downhill (DH)
Bronze medal – third place	1993	Downhill (DH)
Bronze medal – third place	1994	Downhill (DH)

Melissa "Missy" Giove (born January 20, 1972) is a former American professional downhill mountain bike racer. Nicknamed The Missile, she won 14 NORBA national downhill titles and 11 World Cup medals. Giove's other accomplishments include three overall NORBA downhill crowns, two World Cup overalls, and the 1994 World Championship title.

== Career ==
Giove raced for Yeti Cycles, along with other racers: Myles Rockwell, Jimmy Deaton, John Tomac and Johnny O'Mara, managed by former owner of Yeti Cycles, John Parker, the Volvo-Cannondale USA cycling team.

She was one of the first international female mountain biking stars in the 1990s. She won bronze medals in the downhill event at the UCI Mountain Bike World Championships in 1993 in Métabief, France; 1996 in Cairns, Australia; and 2002 in Kaprun, Austria. In 1994, she became world champion in Vail, United States. In August 2003, she retired from full-time racing.

In 2015, Giove returned to competition at the UCI Mountain Bike World Cup downhill round at Windham, New York, qualifying 17th, 36.558 seconds behind Rachel Atherton's time of 3:05.135. She finished 16th in the final after a crash at the road gap.

Giove was inducted into the Mountain Bike Hall of Fame in 2016, and into the U.S. Bicycling Hall of Fame in 2022. She was also an honorary inductee into the Italian Hall of Fame in 2017.

She was known for her eccentric style, often racing with the desiccated body of her deceased pet piranha, Gonzo, hanging from a necklace and the ashes of her dog, Ruffian, tucked into her bra.

== Media appearances ==
Giove has made appearances in television talk shows such as Late Night with Conan O'Brien and The Jon Stewart Show.

She was also featured as one of the five real-life professional riders unlockable in the 2003 PlayStation 2 game Downhill Domination, alongside Eric Carter, Tara Llanes, Richie Schley, and Brian Lopes.

Giove appeared in an episode of the sports animated series Rocket Power titled "Missile Crisis" in March 2004.

In 2022, she was featured as a main character in the book Pressure: A Memoir, by Eric Canori.

== Legal issues ==
=== Civil litigation ===
In 1999, Giove, along with Amazon Inc., filed a lawsuit against Cannondale and Dirt Camp, Inc. over a 1999 Cannondale Product Catolog and sought $2 million in damages. During the summer and early fall of 1998, while Giove was still a member of the team, Cannondale designed, published, and distributed its 1999 products catalog with several photographs of Giove. Subsequently, Giove and Team Sports Mountain Inc. (TMSI) failed to renegotiate a contract, and the TSMI/Amazon contract expired on December 31, 1998. Cannondale continued to distribute the 1999 catalog containing Giove's photographs after the TSMI/Amazon contract expired.

=== Criminal matters ===
In June 2009, Giove was arrested in Wilton, New York on charges of conspiring to possess and distribute near 334 pounds of marijuana found hidden in a car trailer during a routine traffic stop. The case netted over $12,515,738 assets seized in the conspiracy. Giove pleaded guilty in the case and was sentenced to five years on probation and six months under house arrest.

== Personal life ==
Giove is openly lesbian. In 2003, she appeared on the cover of the lesbian magazine Girlfriends.

In 2009, she was ranked the 10th greatest LGBT athlete of all time by the Finnish sports magazine Urheilulehti.
