= Mickaël Pascal =

French mountain biker

Personal information
- Born: 11 October 1979 (age 47) Chambéry, France

Cycling career
- Sport: Cycling
- Discipline: Downhill
- Role: Rider
Medal record
Representing France
Mountain bike racing
World Championships
Gold medal – first place	1997 Château-d'Œx	Junior downhill
Silver medal – second place	1999 Åre	Downhill
Silver medal – second place	2003 Lugano	Downhill
Bronze medal – third place	1998 Mont Sainte-Anne	Downhill
Bronze medal – third place	2000 Sierra Nevada	Downhill
European Championships
Silver medal – second place	2003 Graz	Downhill

Mickaël Pascal (born 11 October 1979) is a French former professional downhill mountain biker. He finished second at the UCI Downhill World Championships in 1999 and 2003 and third in 1998 and 2000. He also won the National Downhill Championships in 2008 and 2011. He also finished third overall and won two events at the 2001 UCI Downhill World Cup.
