= Chris Kovarik =

Mountain bike racer

Personal information
- Born: 1 March 1978 (age 48) Dandenong, Victoria, Australia

Cycling career
- Sport: Cycling
- Disciplines: Downhill and four cross mountain biking
- Role: Rider

Professional team
- 2008-present: Chain Reaction Cycles/Intense Cycle

Chris Kovarik (born 1 March 1978 in Dandenong, Victoria, Australia) is an Australian professional racing cyclist specialising in downhill mountain biking and four cross mountain bike racing. He has earned the title of Australian national champion multiple times and he also won multiple World Cups.

== Cycling career ==
Kovarik started competitive cycling when he was 17 years old and has been a member of the Chain Reaction Cycles/Intense Cycle's MTB Race team since its creation in 2008. Kovarik was joined by fellow Intense rider Finland's Matti Lehikoinen for the 2010 race season.

In 2004, Kovarik shattered his ankle, broke the tibia on the same leg and spent 4½ months with a metal cage around his leg, leading to 7 months off the bike and missing the 2004 World Cup/Championship season. At the time, doctors had said that he may never ride again, however, he went on to place 5th in the World Championships in New Zealand in 2005.

Chris won the Australian National Downhill Championships in January 2010 at the SRAM Corporation Australian Mountain Bike Championships in Adelaide.

Kovarik's career highlights include:

- 2000 - Australian National Champ
- 2001 - Australian National Champ
- 2002 - Australian National Champ
- 2002 - 1st World Cup : Fort William (won by 14 secs)
- 2005 - 5th World Championships : New Zealand
- 2006 - 1st World Cup : Mont Saint Anne

== Major wins ==
1998
DH MTB National Series

1st - Round VIC
2nd - Round NSW

1999
1st DH MTB Norba Series Mammoth Mountain USA
DH Norba Series

1st - Deer Valley USA
2nd - Mount Snow USA

DH MTB World Cup

2nd - USA
10th - USA

DH MTB Australian Titles

2nd - VIC
3rd - NSW

2nd DH MTB National Series Round VIC

2000
1st DH MTB Australian Titles QLD
1st DH MTB Norba Series Round USA
DH MTB National Series

1st - Round QLD
1st - Round VIC

2nd DH MTB Norba Series Round USA
3rd DL MTB National Series Round VIC
7th DH MTB World Cup
8th DH MTB World Cup USA
10th DH MTB World Championships ESP
11th DH MTB World Cup CAN

2001
1st DH MTB Australian Titles VIC
1st DH MTB World Cup CAN
1st DH MTB National Series Round VIC
DH MTB World Cup

2nd - CAN
2nd - FRA
4th - CAN
4th - #1

DH MTB Norba

3rd - Series #1 USA
3rd - Series #3 USA
5th - Series 2 USA

4th DH MTB World Championships USA
2002
DH MTB World Cup

1st - USA
1st - GBR
1st - SLO
8th - FRA
9th - CAN

1st DH MTB Australian Titles NSW
1st DH MTB Championships Series USA
3rd DH MTB World Championships AUT
3rd DH MTB National Points Series GBR
4th National MTB Series USA
5th DH MTB Mercury Sea Otter Classic USA
5th 4X MTB Mercury Sea Otter Classic USA
17th 4X MTB World Championships AUT

2003
1st DH Norba Series #2 USA
2nd DH MTB World Cup FRA
4X Norba

2nd - Series #3 USA
5th - Series #2 USA

4th DH MTB World Championships SUI
6th DH MTB World Cup GBR

2005
DH MTB World Cup

2nd - #3 AUT
3rd - #6 USA
4th - #8 GBR
4th - #2 GER
5th - #4 CAN

17th - Championships ITA
41st - #7 ITA
8th DH Australian MTB Championships VIC
9th 4X MTB World Cup #6 USA
11th 4X MTB World Cup #4 CAN

2006
DH MTB World Cup

1st - #4 CAN
5th - Championships NZL
5th - #3 GER
8th - #1 ESP
9th - #6 AU
15th - #5 BRA
20th - #4 SCO

3rd 4X MTB World Cup #4 SCO
3rd Australian DH MTB Championships VIC
49th 4X MTB World Cup #1 ESP

2007
7th 4X MTB World Cup #4 AUT
DH MTB World Cup

23rd - #4 AUT
38th - #1 ESP

86th DH MTB World Championships GBR

2008
6th MTB World Cup DH #2 Andorra

- 12th DH MTB World Championships ITA
