= Leigh Donovan =

American cyclist

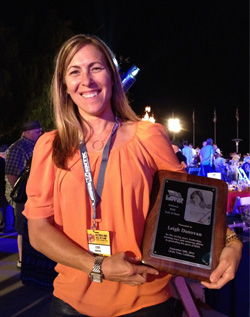
- Donovan at the 2013 BMX hall of fame induction ceremony

Personal information
- Full name: Leigh I. Donovan
- Nickname: Booty
- Born: December 11, 1971 (age 54) Orange, California, U.S.
- Height: 1.65 m (5 ft 5 in)
- Weight: 143 lb (65 kg)

Cycling career
- Sport: Cycling
- Disciplines: Mountain bike BMX
- Role: Racer-Ambassador-Coach
- Rider type: Off-road

Major wins
- (United States) Norba National Championship (8 Titles); UCI World Cup (7 Wins); UCI World Championship (1 win)
Medal record
Women's mountain bike racing
Representing United States
World Championships
Gold medal – first place	1995 Kirchzarten	Downhill
Silver medal – second place	1996 Cairns	Downhill
Bronze medal – third place	2001 Vail	Downhill

Leigh Donovan
- Occupation: self-employed
- Years active: 1993–present
- Partner: Craig Stikman Glaspell
- Children: 1

Leigh Donovan (born December 11, 1971, in Orange, California) is an American former professional downhill mountain bike and BMX racer and current cycling ambassador and mountain bike skills instructor and based out of Colorado Springs, Colo.

== Cycling career ==
Leigh Donovan is a retired American professional mountain bike racer and coach. From 1992 to 2001, she was among the most decorated U.S. downhill and slalom riders, winning the UCI Downhill World Championship in Germany in 1995 and capturing eight USA Cycling National Championship titles over the course of her career. She concluded her professional racing career at the 2001 UCI World Championships in Vail, Colorado, where she placed third in the downhill.

After retiring, Donovan transitioned into sports marketing with Hansen’s Energy (later rebranded as Monster Energy). In 2002, she founded and operated Tangerine, a clothing boutique in Temecula, California, which she managed for nearly a decade. The store thrived during its first several years before closing in 2011 following changes in the retail market after the 2008–2009 economic downturn.

In 2010, nine years after her retirement and at the age of 38, Donovan made a return to competition. Balancing training with raising her five-year-old daughter and running her retail store, she earned fourth place at the USA Cycling National Championships, securing a spot on the U.S. National Downhill Team. At the UCI World Championships in Mont-Sainte-Anne, Quebec, she finished eighth, making her the top-placed American and the oldest competitor in the field. During the opening ceremonies, she and her daughter carried the U.S. flag. As of 2025, Donovan remains the last American Elite Downhill rider to win a UCI World Championship, with her 1995 gold medal marking the end of a three-decades drought for the United States in the discipline.

Donovan married her longtime partner and race mechanic, Craig “Stikman” Glaspell, in 2000; the couple has one daughter. Since retiring, she has become a respected coach and advocate for the sport, hosting clinics and events for riders of all levels, with a special focus on women’s programs. In 2014, she founded iChooseBikes, a skills-based coaching business dedicated to helping riders of all ages and abilities develop strong foundations and confidence on the bike.

From 2022 to 2023, Donovan worked with SRAM as the senior sales representative for Southern California, overseeing accounts across Southern California and Southern Nevada and working directly with more than 150 retailers. Her role focused on sales and marketing support for the company’s cycling products. She left the position in July 2023.

In 2025, Donovan returned to college to pursue a Psychology degree, graduating in 2029.

She remains the only cyclist, male or female, to be inducted into all three major U.S. cycling halls of fame: the USA BMX Hall of Fame, the Mountain Bike Hall of Fame, and the U.S. Bicycling Hall of Fame.

== Career highlights ==
• 2020 USA Bicycling Hall of fame inductee

• 2013 BMX Hall of fame inductee

• 2014 MTB Hall of fame inductee

• Only female in all 3 major HOF’s: MTB Hall of fame, USA Bicycling Hall of fame and BMX Hall of fame

• 39 UCI World Cup Podiums

• 8-time U.S. NORBA USA Cycling National Champion

• 1995 UCI Mountain Bike World Championships- Good Medalist & Crowned Downhill World Champion

• 1996 UCI Mountain Bike World Championships- Silver Medalist

• 2001 UCI Mountain Bike World Championships- Bronze Medalist

• 2001 UCI World Cup Dual Champion

• 3-time UCI World Championship medalist

• 1987 & 1988 USABMX National Girls Cruiser Champion

• 1985 USABMX National #1 Age Group Champion

• 1987 USABMX National #1 Age Group Champion

• In the 25 years of the official UCI World Downhill Championships, Leigh is 1 of only 3 American women to have won the title, and no American female has been World Champion since Leigh Donovan.
