= 2015 UCI Mountain Bike World Cup =

Series of races for all-terrain bicyclists

- Date: April–August 2015

The 2015 UCI Mountain Bike World Cup included two disciplines: Olympic Cross-Country (XCO) and Downhill (DHI).

The overall World Cup titles in cross-country were won by Nino Schurter and Jolanda Neff. The downhill titles were won by Aaron Gwin and Rachel Atherton. The junior men's downhill title was won by Laurie Greenland.

== Cross-country ==
=== Elite ===
Date	Venue	Podium (Men)	Podium (Women)
24 May	(Czech Republic) Nové Město na Moravě	(Czech Republic) Jaroslav Kulhavý	(Switzerland) Jolanda Neff
24 May	(Czech Republic) Nové Město na Moravě	(Switzerland) Nino Schurter	(Norway) Gunn-Rita Dahle Flesjå
24 May	(Czech Republic) Nové Město na Moravě	(France) Julien Absalon	(France) Pauline Ferrand-Prévot
31 May	(Germany) Albstadt	(France) Julien Absalon	(Switzerland) Jolanda Neff
31 May	(Germany) Albstadt	(Switzerland) Nino Schurter	(Norway) Gunn-Rita Dahle Flesjå
31 May	(Germany) Albstadt	(Czech Republic) Jaroslav Kulhavý	(Canada) Catharine Pendrel
5 July	(Switzerland) Lenzerheide	(Czech Republic) Jaroslav Kulhavý	(Norway) Gunn-Rita Dahle Flesjå
5 July	(Switzerland) Lenzerheide	(Switzerland) Nino Schurter	(United States) Lea Davison
5 July	(Switzerland) Lenzerheide	(Czech Republic) Ondřej Cink	(Canada) Catharine Pendrel
2 August	(Canada) Mont-Sainte-Anne	(Switzerland) Nino Schurter	(Switzerland) Jolanda Neff
2 August	(Canada) Mont-Sainte-Anne	(France) Julien Absalon	(Canada) Catharine Pendrel
2 August	(Canada) Mont-Sainte-Anne	(Switzerland) Florian Vogel	(France) Pauline Ferrand-Prévot
9 August	(United States) Windham	(Switzerland) Nino Schurter	(France) Pauline Ferrand-Prévot
9 August	(United States) Windham	(France) Julien Absalon	(Switzerland) Jolanda Neff
9 August	(United States) Windham	(Germany) Manuel Fumic	(Denmark) Annika Langvad
23 August	(Italy) Val di Sole	(Switzerland) Nino Schurter	(Denmark) Annika Langvad
23 August	(Italy) Val di Sole	(France) Julien Absalon	(Switzerland) Jolanda Neff
23 August	(Italy) Val di Sole	(Switzerland) Florian Vogel	(Russia) Irina Kalentieva

== Downhill ==
Date	Venue	Podium (Men)	Podium (Women)	Podium (Juniors)
12 April 2015	(France) Lourdes	(United States) Aaron Gwin	(France) Emelline Ragot	(Australia) Andrew Crimmins
12 April 2015	(France) Lourdes	(France) Loïc Bruni	(United Kingdom) Rachel Atherton	(United Kingdom) Laurie Greenland
12 April 2015	(France) Lourdes	(United Kingdom) Michael Jones	(France) Myriam Nicole	(Australia) Jackson Frew
7 June 2015	(United Kingdom) Fort William	(South Africa) Greg Minnaar	(United Kingdom) Rachel Atherton	(United Kingdom) Laurie Greenland
7 June 2015	(United Kingdom) Fort William	(United States) Aaron Gwin	(United Kingdom) Tahnee Seagrave	(Australia) Andrew Crimmins
7 June 2015	(United Kingdom) Fort William	(Colombia) Marcelo Gutierrez Villegas	(France) Emmeline Ragot	(Belgium) Martin Maes
14 June 2015	(Austria) Leogang	(United States) Aaron Gwin	(United Kingdom) Rachel Atherton	(Australia) Andrew Crimmins
14 June 2015	(Austria) Leogang	(Australia) Connor Fearon	(United Kingdom) Tahnee Seagrave	(Republic of Ireland) Jacob Dickson
14 June 2015	(Austria) Leogang	(France) Remi Thirion	(France) Emmeline Ragot	(United Kingdom) Laurie Greenland
5 July 2015	(Switzerland) Lenzerheide	(South Africa) Greg Minnaar	(United Kingdom) Rachel Atherton	(United Kingdom) Laurie Greenland
5 July 2015	(Switzerland) Lenzerheide	(France) Loïc Bruni	(United Kingdom) Manon Carpenter	(Australia) Andrew Crimmins
5 July 2015	(Switzerland) Lenzerheide	(Australia) Dean Lucas	(Australia) Tracey Hannah	(Spain) Alex Marin Trillo
1 August 2015	(Canada) Mont-Sainte-Anne	(United Kingdom) Josh Bryceland	(United Kingdom) Rachel Atherton	(United Kingdom) Laurie Greenland
1 August 2015	(Canada) Mont-Sainte-Anne	(France) Loïc Bruni	(United Kingdom) Manon Carpenter	(Spain) Alex Marin Trillo
1 August 2015	(Canada) Mont-Sainte-Anne	(Australia) Troy Brosnan	(France) Myriam Nicole	(Australia) Andrew Crimmins
8 August 2015	(United States) Windham	(United States) Aaron Gwin	(United Kingdom) Rachel Atherton	(United Kingdom) Laurie Greenland
8 August 2015	(United States) Windham	(South Africa) Greg Minnaar	(United Kingdom) Manon Carpenter	(Australia) Andrew Crimmins
8 August 2015	(United States) Windham	(France) Loris Vergier	(United Kingdom) Tahnee Seagrave	(United Kingdom) Neil Stewart
22 August 2015	(Italy) Val di Sole	(United States) Aaron Gwin	(United Kingdom) Rachel Atherton	(Italy) Loris Revelli
22 August 2015	(Italy) Val di Sole	(France) Loïc Bruni	(France) Myriam Nicole	(Republic of Ireland) Jacob Dickson
22 August 2015	(Italy) Val di Sole	(Australia) Troy Brosnan	(United Kingdom) Manon Carpenter	(United Kingdom) Laurie Greenland
		Podium (Men)	Podium (Women)	Podium (Juniors)
Final Standings	UCI World Cup; Downhill Championship	(United States) Aaron Gwin	(United Kingdom) Rachel Atherton	(United Kingdom) Laurie Greenland
Final Standings	UCI World Cup; Downhill Championship	(France) Loïc Bruni	(United Kingdom) Manon Carpenter	(Australia) Andrew Crimmins
Final Standings	UCI World Cup; Downhill Championship	(Australia) Troy Brosnan	(United Kingdom) Tahnee Seagrave	(Republic of Ireland) Jacob Dickson

== Series Classification ==
=== Men's ===
CROSS-COUNTRY – ELITE
Pos	Rider	Points
1.	(Switzerland) Nino Schurter	850
2.	(Czech Republic) Jaroslav Kulhavý	740
3.	(France) Julien Absalon	710
4.	(Switzerland) Mathias Flückiger	560
5.	(Switzerland) Florian Vogel	524
6.	(Germany) Manuel Fumic	450
7.	(Switzerland) Ralph Näf	420
8.	(Czech Republic) Ondrej Cink	392
9.	(France) Maxime Marotte	374
10.	(Italy) Andrea Tiberi	355

DOWNHILL – Senior
Pos	Athletes	Points
1.	(United States) Aaron Gwin	1329
2.	(France) Loïc Bruni	1059
3.	(Australia) Troy Brosnan	1013
4.	(South Africa) Greg Minnaar	1006
5.	(United Kingdom) Josh Bryceland	836
6.	(United Kingdom) Gee Atherton	760
7.	(United Kingdom) Danny Hart	624
8.	(Colombia) Marcelo Gutierrez Villegas	604
9.	(New Zealand) Samuel Blenkinsop	546
10.	(New Zealand) Brook McDonald	542

DOWNHILL – Junior
Pos	Athletes	Points
1.	(United Kingdom) Laurie Greenland	320
2.	(Australia) Andrew Crimmins	245
3.	(Republic of Ireland) Jacob Dickson	168
4.	(Spain) Alex Marin Trillo	144
5.	(Italy) Loris Revelli	141
6.	(United Kingdom) Neil Stewart	112
7.	(France) Thibault Laly	113
8.	(Australia) Jackson Frew	90
9.	(United States) Charlie Harrison	70
10.	(Belgium) Martin Maes	60

=== Women's ===
CROSS-COUNTRY – ELITE
Pos	Rider	Points
1.	(Switzerland) Jolanda Neff	900
2.	(Norway) Gunn-Rita Dahle Flesjå	790
3.	(Canada) Catharine Pendrel	670
4.	(United States) Lea Davison	550
5.	(Canada) Emily Batty	505
6.	(Russia) Irina Kalentieva	500
7.	(Poland) Maja Włoszczowska	460
8.	(Germany) Helen Grobert	381
9.	(Italy) Eva Lechner	344
10.	(France) Pauline Ferrand-Prévot	320

DOWNHILL
Pos	Athletes	Points
1.	(United Kingdom) Rachel Atherton	1660
2.	(United Kingdom) Manon Carpenter	1079
3.	(United Kingdom) Tahnee Seagrave	986
4.	(Australia) Tracey Hannah	907
5.	(France) Emmeline Ragot	785
6.	(France) Myriam Nicole	670
7.	(France) Morgane Charre	642
8.	(Canada) Casey Brown	536
9.	(Switzerland) Emelie Siegenthaler	521
10.	(United Kingdom) Katy Curd	489

== See also ==
- 2015 UCI Mountain Bike & Trials World Championships
