= 2017 UCI Mountain Bike World Cup =

Series of races for all-terrain bicyclists

- Date: April–October 2017

The 2017 UCI Mountain Bike World Cup was a series of races in Olympic Cross-Country (XCO), Cross-Country Eliminator (XCE), and Downhill (DHI). Each discipline had an Elite Men and an Elite Women category. There were also men's and women's under-23 categories in the XCO and junior men's and women's categories in the DHI. The cross-country series had six rounds and the downhill series had seven rounds.

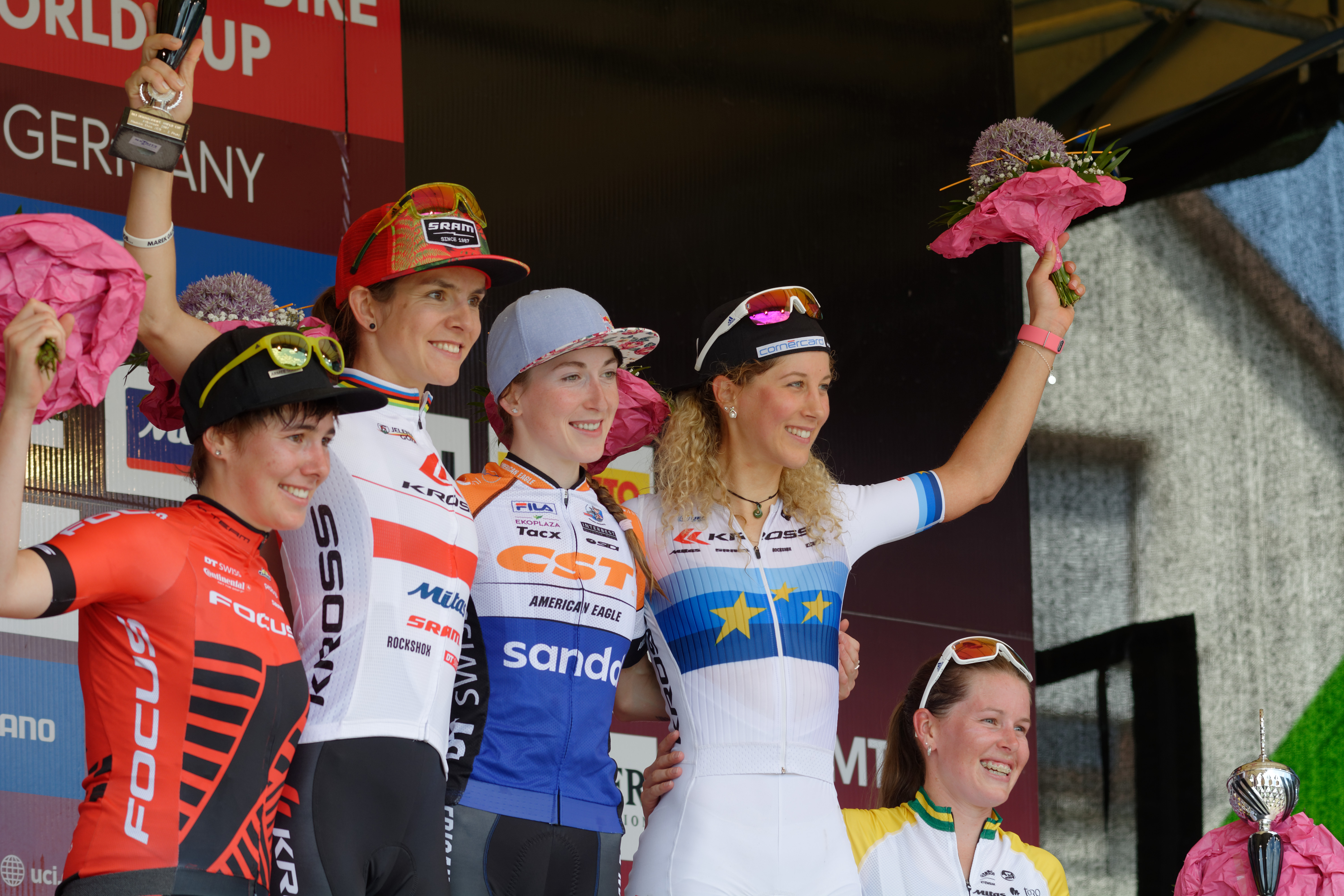
Women's cross country elite podium in Albstadt (from left): Linda Indergand, Maja Włoszczowska, Yana Belomoyna, Jolanda Neff, Rebecca Henderson

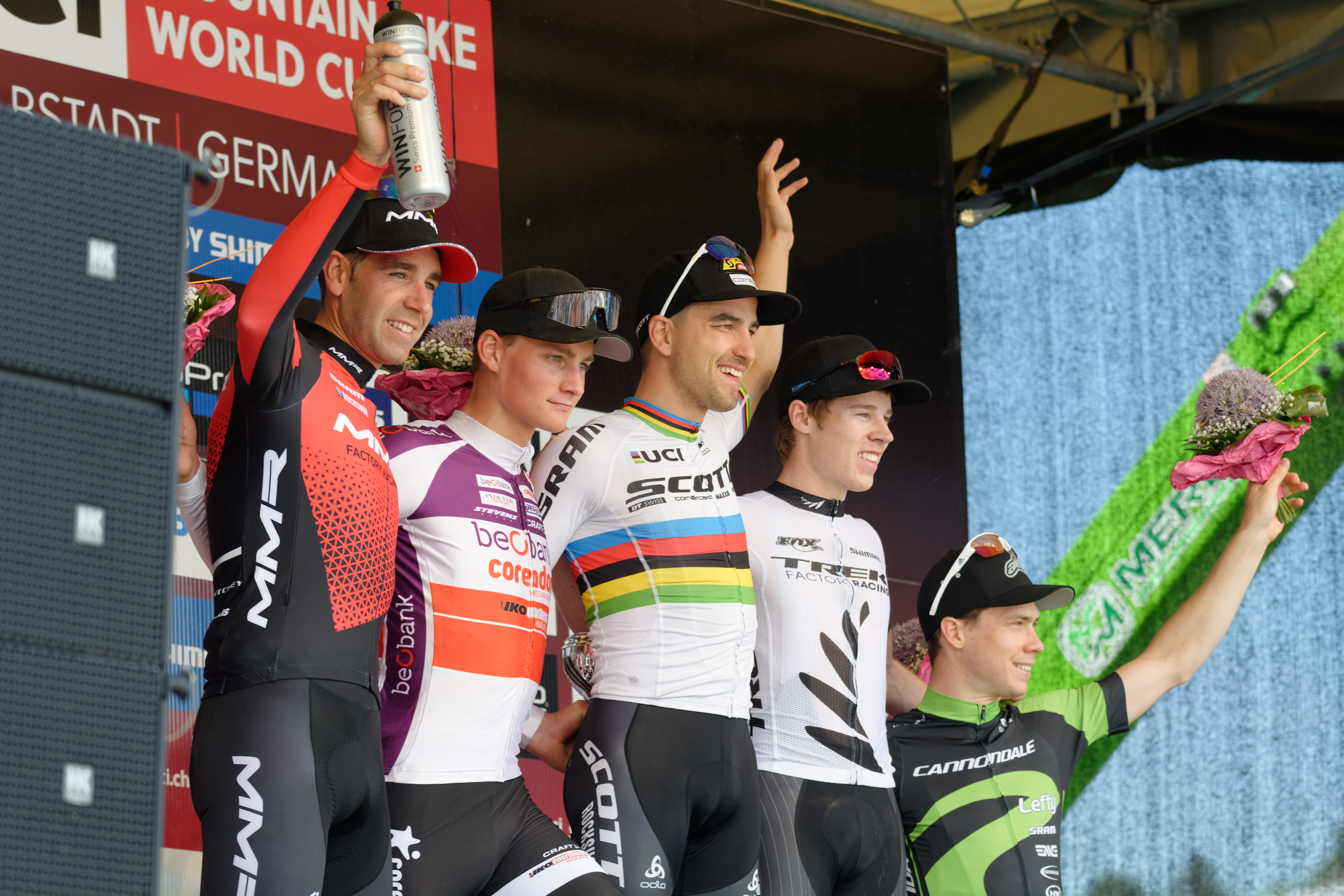
Men's cross country elite podium in Albstadt (from left): David Valero, Mathieu van der Poel, Nino Schurter, Anton Cooper, Maxime Marotte

The Cross-Country Eliminator (XCE) was included as a UCI World Cup discipline for the first time since 2014. The XCE schedule for 2017 had six rounds. The XCE World Cup events had previously been held alongside the XCO and DHI races, but in 2017 they were held as separate events.

The Junior Women's Downhill category was included as a World Cup discipline for the first time in 2017.

New regulations were introduced in 2017 to reduce the numbers of competitors in the UCI World Cup downhill events. The minimum number of UCI points required to compete in a World Cup was increased from 30 to 40. The field sizes for the downhill finals were reduced from 20 to 15 (plus protected riders) for the Elite Women and from 30 to 20 for the Junior Men.

== Cross-country ==
=== Elite ===
Date	Venue	Podium (Men)	Podium (Women)
20–21 May	(Czech Republic) Nové Město na Moravě	(Switzerland) Nino Schurter	(Denmark) Annika Langvad
20–21 May	(Czech Republic) Nové Město na Moravě	(Spain) David Valero Serrano	(Germany) Sabine Spitz
20–21 May	(Czech Republic) Nové Město na Moravě	(France) Julien Absalon	(Switzerland) Linda Indergand
27–28 May	(Germany) Albstadt	(Switzerland) Nino Schurter	(Ukraine) Yana Belomoyna
27–28 May	(Germany) Albstadt	(Netherlands) Mathieu van der Poel	(Poland) Maja Włoszczowska
27–28 May	(Germany) Albstadt	(New Zealand) Anton Cooper	(Switzerland) Jolanda Neff
1–2 July	(Andorra) Vallnord	(Switzerland) Nino Schurter	(Ukraine) Yana Belomoyna
1–2 July	(Andorra) Vallnord	(Switzerland) Mathias Flückiger	(Denmark) Annika Langvad
1–2 July	(Andorra) Vallnord	(France) Jordan Sarrou	(Norway) Gunn-Rita Dahle Flesjå
8–9 July	(Switzerland) Lenzerheide	(Switzerland) Nino Schurter	(United Kingdom) Annie Last
8–9 July	(Switzerland) Lenzerheide	(Czech Republic) Jaroslav Kulhavý	(Norway) Gunn-Rita Dahle Flesjå
8–9 July	(Switzerland) Lenzerheide	(Russia) Anton Sintsov	(Ukraine) Yana Belomoyna
5–6 August	(Canada) Mont-Sainte-Anne	(Switzerland) Nino Schurter	(Ukraine) Yana Belomoyna
5–6 August	(Canada) Mont-Sainte-Anne	(France) Stéphane Tempier	(France) Pauline Ferrand-Prévot
5–6 August	(Canada) Mont-Sainte-Anne	(Italy) Gerhard Kerschbaumer	(Canada) Catharine Pendrel
26–27 August	(Italy) Val di Sole	(Switzerland) Nino Schurter	(Switzerland) Jolanda Neff
26–27 August	(Italy) Val di Sole	(France) Stéphane Tempier	(Ukraine) Yana Belomoyna
26–27 August	(Italy) Val di Sole	(France) Julien Absalon	(Poland) Maja Włoszczowska

Nino Schurter was the first Cross-country mountain biker to accomplish a Perfect season. Additionally he won at the World Championships the gold medal at the single and at the mixed race and the Cape Epic.

=== Under 23 ===
Date	Venue	Podium (Men)	Podium (Women)
20–21 May	(Czech Republic) Nové Město na Moravě	(Norway) Petter Fagerhaug	(United States) Kate Courtney
20–21 May	(Czech Republic) Nové Město na Moravě	(Latvia) Mārtiņš Blūms	(United Kingdom) Evie Richards
20–21 May	(Czech Republic) Nové Město na Moravě	(Denmark) Sebastian Fini Carstensen	(Switzerland) Sina Frei
27–28 May	(Germany) Albstadt	(Italy) Nadir Colledani	(United Kingdom) Evie Richards
27–28 May	(Germany) Albstadt	(Germany) Georg Egger	(United States) Kate Courtney
27–28 May	(Germany) Albstadt	(Canada) Peter Disera	(Switzerland) Sina Frei
1–2 July	(Andorra) Vallnord	(Denmark) Simon Andreassen	(Switzerland) Sina Frei
1–2 July	(Andorra) Vallnord	(South Africa) Alan Hatherly	(United States) Kate Courtney
1–2 July	(Andorra) Vallnord	(Latvia) Mārtiņš Blūms	(United Kingdom) Evie Richards
8–9 July	(Switzerland) Lenzerheide	(Latvia) Mārtiņš Blūms	(United States) Kate Courtney
8–9 July	(Switzerland) Lenzerheide	(Germany) Maximilian Brandl	(Switzerland) Sina Frei
8–9 July	(Switzerland) Lenzerheide	(Italy) Nadir Colledani	(United Kingdom) Evie Richards
5–6 August	(Canada) Mont-Sainte-Anne	(Latvia) Mārtiņš Blūms	(United States) Kate Courtney
5–6 August	(Canada) Mont-Sainte-Anne	(Italy) Nadir Colledani	(Switzerland) Sina Frei
5–6 August	(Canada) Mont-Sainte-Anne	(Denmark) Simon Andreassen	(France) Lucie Urruty
26–27 August	(Italy) Val di Sole	(Italy) Nadir Colledani	(United States) Kate Courtney
26–27 August	(Italy) Val di Sole	(Latvia) Mārtiņš Blūms	(Switzerland) Sina Frei
26–27 August	(Italy) Val di Sole	(Norway) Petter Fagerhaug	(United Kingdom) Evie Richards

=== Eliminator ===
Date	Venue	Podium (Men)
5–6 May	(Italy) Volterra	(France) Lorenzo Serres
5–6 May	(Italy) Volterra	(Spain) Alberto Mingorance
5–6 May	(Italy) Volterra	(Netherlands) Jeroen Van Eck
3–4 June	(United States) Columbus	(France) Simon Rogier
3–4 June	(United States) Columbus	(Spain) Alberto Mingorance
3–4 June	(United States) Columbus	(United States) Seth Kemp
24–25 June	(Belgium) Waregem	(Germany) Simon Gegenheimer
24–25 June	(Belgium) Waregem	(France) Titouan Perrin-Ganier
24–25 June	(Belgium) Waregem	(Czech Republic) Dominik Prudek
26–27 August	(Germany) Winterberg	(Norway) Torjus Bern Hansen
26–27 August	(Germany) Winterberg	(France) Titiouan Perrin-Ganier
26–27 August	(Germany) Winterberg	(Netherlands) Jeroen Van Eck
2–3 September	(Netherlands) Apeldoorn	(Germany) Simon Gegenheimer
2–3 September	(Netherlands) Apeldoorn	(Spain) Alberto Mingorance
2–3 September	(Netherlands) Apeldoorn	(Netherlands) Lehvi Braam
23–24 September	(Belgium) Antwerp	(France) Hugo Briatta
23–24 September	(Belgium) Antwerp	(Germany) Simon Gegenheimer
23–24 September	(Belgium) Antwerp	(France) Lorenzo Serres

== Downhill ==
=== Elite ===
Date	Venue	Podium (Men)	Podium (Women)
29–30 April	(France) Lourdes	(France) Alexandre Fayolle	(United Kingdom) Rachel Atherton
29–30 April	(France) Lourdes	(Canada) Mark Wallace	(Australia) Tracey Hannah
29–30 April	(France) Lourdes	(Colombia) Marcelo Gutiérrez Villegas	(United Kingdom) Tahnée Seagrave
3–4 June	(United Kingdom) Fort William	(South Africa) Greg Minnaar	(Australia) Tracey Hannah
3–4 June	(United Kingdom) Fort William	(Australia) Jack Moir	(France) Myriam Nicole
3–4 June	(United Kingdom) Fort William	(United States) Aaron Gwin	(Switzerland) Emilie Siegenthaler
10–11 June	(Austria) Leogang	(United States) Aaron Gwin	(United Kingdom) Tahnée Seagrave
10–11 June	(Austria) Leogang	(France) Loris Vergier	(Australia) Tracey Hannah
10–11 June	(Austria) Leogang	(South Africa) Greg Minnaar	(France) Myriam Nicole
1–2 July	(Andorra) Vallnord	(Australia) Troy Brosnan	(France) Myriam Nicole
1–2 July	(Andorra) Vallnord	(South Africa) Greg Minnaar	(United Kingdom) Tahnée Seagrave
1–2 July	(Andorra) Vallnord	(United Kingdom) Danny Hart	(France) Marine Cabirou
8–9 July	(Switzerland) Lenzerheide	(South Africa) Greg Minnaar	(France) Myriam Nicole
8–9 July	(Switzerland) Lenzerheide	(Australia) Troy Brosnan	(United Kingdom) Rachel Atherton
8–9 July	(Switzerland) Lenzerheide	(United Kingdom) Danny Hart	(Switzerland) Emilie Siegenthaler
5–6 August	(Canada) Mont-Sainte-Anne	(United States) Aaron Gwin	(United Kingdom) Tahnee Seagrave
5–6 August	(Canada) Mont-Sainte-Anne	(Australia) Dean Lucas	(France) Myriam Nicole
5–6 August	(Canada) Mont-Sainte-Anne	(United Kingdom) Danny Hart	(Australia) Tracey Hannah
26–27 August	(Italy) Val di Sole	(United States) Aaron Gwin	(United Kingdom) Tahnee Seagrave
26–27 August	(Italy) Val di Sole	(France) Amaury Pierron	(France) Myriam Nicole
26–27 August	(Italy) Val di Sole	(France) Loïc Bruni	(Australia) Tracey Hannah

=== Junior ===
Date	Venue	Podium (Men)	Podium (Women)
29–30 April	(France) Lourdes	(Canada) Finnley Iles	(France) Mélanie Chappaz
29–30 April	(France) Lourdes	(United Kingdom) Kaos Seagrave	(France) Flora Lesoin
29–30 April	(France) Lourdes	(France) Sylvain Cougoureux	(Italy) Alessia Missiaggia
3–4 June	(United Kingdom) Fort William	(United Kingdom) Matt Walker	(United Kingdom) Megan James
3–4 June	(United Kingdom) Fort William	(Canada) Finnley Iles	(France) Mélanie Chappaz
3–4 June	(United Kingdom) Fort William	(France) Sylvain Cougoureux	(France) Flora Lesoin
10–11 June	(Austria) Leogang	(Canada) Finnley Iles	(Latvia) Paula Zibasa
10–11 June	(Austria) Leogang	(United Kingdom) Matt Walker	(France) Mélanie Chappaz
10–11 June	(Austria) Leogang	(United Kingdom) Kade Edwards	(Italy) Alessia Missiaggia
1–2 July	(Andorra) Vallnord	(Canada) Finnley Iles	(United Kingdom) Megan James
1–2 July	(Andorra) Vallnord	(United Kingdom) Matt Walker	(France) Mélanie Chappaz
1–2 July	(Andorra) Vallnord	(United Kingdom) Kade Edwards	(Italy) Beatrice Migliorini
8–9 July	(Switzerland) Lenzerheide	(Canada) Finnley Iles	(Latvia) Paula Zibasa
8–9 July	(Switzerland) Lenzerheide	(United Kingdom) Joe Breeden	(France) Mélanie Chappaz
8–9 July	(Switzerland) Lenzerheide	(France) Sylvain Cougoureux	(New Zealand) Shania Rawson
5–6 August	(Canada) Mont-Sainte-Anne	(Canada) Finnley Iles	(France) Mélanie Chappaz
5–6 August	(Canada) Mont-Sainte-Anne	(France) Sylvain Cougoureux	(United States) Mazie Hayden
5–6 August	(Canada) Mont-Sainte-Anne	(United Kingdom) Joe Breeden	(United States) Kaytlin Melvin
26–27 August	(Italy) Val di Sole	(Canada) Finnley Iles	(France) Mélanie Chappaz
26–27 August	(Italy) Val di Sole	(United Kingdom) Matt Walker	(Latvia) Paula Zibasa
26–27 August	(Italy) Val di Sole	(France) Sylvain Cougoureux	(Italy) Beatrice Migliorini

== Series classification ==
=== Men ===
Cross-country
Pos	Rider	Points
1.	(Switzerland) Nino Schurter	1500
2.	(France) Stéphane Tempier	850
3.	(France) Maxime Marotte	772
4.	(Spain) David Valero	691
5.	(France) Jordan Sarrou	685
6.	(France) Titouan Carod	592
7.	(New Zealand) Anton Cooper	530
8.	(France) Julien Absalon	520
9.	(Germany) Manuel Fumic	507
10.	(Switzerland) Florian Vogel	496

Under-23 cross-country
Pos	Rider	Points
1.	(Latvia) Martins Blums	420
2.	(Italy) Nadir Colledani	363
3.	(Norway) Petter Fagerhaug	207
4.	(Germany) Georg Egger	180
5.	(South Africa) Alan Hatherly	153
6.	(Denmark) Simon Andreassen	151
7.	(Canada) Peter Disera	151
8.	(Italy) Gioele Bertolini	125
9.	(Romania) Vlad Dascalu	120
10.	(Denmark) Sebastian Carstensen	120

Downhill
Pos	Athletes	Points
1.	(United States) Aaron Gwin	1149
2.	(Australia) Troy Brosnan	990
3.	(South Africa) Greg Minnaar	974
4.	(France) Loïc Bruni	752
5.	(France) Loris Vergier	700
6.	(United Kingdom) Danny Hart	692
7.	(Australia) Jack Moir	682
8.	(Canada) Mark Wallace	641
9.	(United Kingdom) Laurie Greenland	587
10.	(France) Alexandre Fayoll	490

=== Women ===
Cross-country
Pos	Rider	Points
1.	(Ukraine) Yana Belomoyna	1250
2.	(Poland) Maja Włoszczowska	770
3.	(Denmark) Annika Langvad	744
4.	(Switzerland) Jolanda Neff	715
5.	(Switzerland) Linda Indergand	711
6.	(Norway) Gunn-Rita Dahle Flesjå	704
7.	(United Kingdom) Annie Last	653
8.	(Russia) Irina Kalentieva	652
9.	(Canada) Emily Batty	649
10.	(Netherlands) Anne Tauber	601

Under-23 cross-country
Pos	Rider	Points
1.	(United States) Kate Courtney	500
2.	(Switzerland) Sina Frei	420
3.	(United Kingdom) Evie Richards	340
4.	(United States) Haley Batten	192
5.	(Italy) Martina Berta	177
6.	(Denmark) Malene Degn	173
7.	(Spain) Rocio Del Alba Garcia Martinez	172
8.	(Switzerland) Nicole Koller	163
9.	(France) Lena Gerault	153
10.	(United Kingdom) Isla Short	147

Downhill
Pos	Athletes	Points
1.	(France) Myriam Nicole	1375
2.	(United Kingdom) Tahnée Seagrave	1284
3.	(Australia) Tracey Hannah	1270
4.	(United Kingdom) Rachel Atherton	932
5.	(Switzerland) Emilie Siegenthaler	852
6.	(United Kingdom) Manon Carpenter	644
7.	(Italy) Eleonora Farina	638
8.	(France) Marine Cabirou	567
9.	(Canada) Miranda Miller	387
10.	(Switzerland) Carina Cappellari	295

== See also ==
- 2017 UCI Mountain Bike World Championships
