= 2012 UCI Mountain Bike World Cup =

Series of races for all-terrain bicyclists

- Date: March–September 2012

The 2012 UCI Mountain Bike World Cup included two disciplines: cross-country and downhill.

== Cross-country ==
| Date | Venue | Podium (Men) | Podium (Women) |
|---|---|---|---|
| 17 March 2012 | (South Africa) Pietermaritzburg | (Switzerland) Nino Schurter | (Poland) Maja Włoszczowska |
| 17 March 2012 | (South Africa) Pietermaritzburg | (South Africa) Burry Stander | (Canada) Emily Batty |
| 17 March 2012 | (South Africa) Pietermaritzburg | (Germany) Manuel Fumic | (Canada) Catharine Pendrel |
| 15 April 2012 | (Belgium) Houffalize | (France) Julien Absalon | (Canada) Catharine Pendrel |
| 15 April 2012 | (Belgium) Houffalize | (Switzerland) Nino Schurter | (France) Julie Bresset |
| 15 April 2012 | (Belgium) Houffalize | (Italy) Marco Aurelio Fontana | (Poland) Maja Włoszczowska |
| 13 May 2012 | (Czech Republic) Nové Město na Moravě | (Switzerland) Nino Schurter | (Canada) Catharine Pendrel |
| 13 May 2012 | (Czech Republic) Nové Město na Moravě | (Czech Republic) Jaroslav Kulhavý | (Russia) Irina Kalentieva |
| 13 May 2012 | (Czech Republic) Nové Město na Moravě | (South Africa) Burry Stander | (Czech Republic) Kateřina Nash |
| 20 May 2012 | (France) La Bresse | (France) Julien Absalon | (Norway) Gunn-Rita Dahle Flesjå |
| 20 May 2012 | (France) La Bresse | (Czech Republic) Jaroslav Kulhavý | (Czech Republic) Kateřina Nash |
| 20 May 2012 | (France) La Bresse | (Switzerland) Ralph Näf | (France) Julie Bresset |
| 23 June 2012 | (Canada) Mont-Sainte-Anne | (Switzerland) Nino Schurter | (Canada) Catharine Pendrel |
| 23 June 2012 | (Canada) Mont-Sainte-Anne | (Spain) José Antonio Hermida | (United States) Georgia Gould |
| 23 June 2012 | (Canada) Mont-Sainte-Anne | (Czech Republic) Jaroslav Kulhavý | (Canada) Marie-Hélène Prémont |
| 30 June 2012 | (United States) Windham | (South Africa) Burry Stander | (Canada) Catharine Pendrel |
| 30 June 2012 | (United States) Windham | (Spain) Sergio Mantecon Gutiérrez | (Czech Republic) Kateřina Nash |
| 30 June 2012 | (United States) Windham | (Italy) Marco Aurelio Fontana | (United States) Georgia Gould |
| 28 July 2012 | (France) Val d'Isère | (Switzerland) Nino Schurter | (Norway) Gunn-Rita Dahle Flesjå |
| 28 July 2012 | (France) Val d'Isère | (Switzerland) Lukas Flückiger | (France) Julie Bresset |
| 28 July 2012 | (France) Val d'Isère | (Italy) Marco Aurelio Fontana | (United Kingdom) Annie Last |
| | | Podium (Men) | Podium (Women) |
| Final Standings | UCI World Cup; Cross Country Championship | (Switzerland) Nino Schurter | (Canada) Catharine Pendrel |
| Final Standings | UCI World Cup; Cross Country Championship | (South Africa) Burry Stander | (Norway) Gunn-Rita Dahle Flesjå |
| Final Standings | UCI World Cup; Cross Country Championship | (Czech Republic) Jaroslav Kulhavý | (Czech Republic) Kateřina Nash |

== Downhill ==
| Date | Venue | Podium (Men) | Podium (Women) |
|---|---|---|---|
| 18 March 2012 | (South Africa) Pietermaritzburg | (South Africa) Greg Minnaar | (Australia) Tracey Hannah |
| 18 March 2012 | (South Africa) Pietermaritzburg | (United States) Aaron Gwin | (United Kingdom) Manon Carpenter |
| 18 March 2012 | (South Africa) Pietermaritzburg | (Australia) Michael Hannah | (France) Emmeline Ragot |
| 3 June 2012 | (Italy) Val di Sole | (United States) Aaron Gwin | (United Kingdom) Rachel Atherton |
| 3 June 2012 | (Italy) Val di Sole | (South Africa) Greg Minnaar | (France) Myriam Nicole |
| 3 June 2012 | (Italy) Val di Sole | (United Kingdom) Gee Atherton | (France) Emmeline Ragot |
| 10 June 2012 | (United Kingdom) Fort William | (United States) Aaron Gwin | (France) Emmeline Ragot |
| 10 June 2012 | (United Kingdom) Fort William | (United Kingdom) Danny Hart | (United Kingdom) Rachel Atherton |
| 10 June 2012 | (United Kingdom) Fort William | (United Kingdom) Gee Atherton | (France) Myriam Nicole |
| 24 June 2012 | (Canada) Mont-Sainte-Anne | (United States) Aaron Gwin | (United Kingdom) Rachel Atherton |
| 24 June 2012 | (Canada) Mont-Sainte-Anne | (South Africa) Greg Minnaar | (France) Myriam Nicole |
| 24 June 2012 | (Canada) Mont-Sainte-Anne | (United Kingdom) Danny Hart | (France) Emmeline Ragot |
| 1 July 2012 | (United States) Windham | (United States) Aaron Gwin | (United Kingdom) Rachel Atherton |
| 1 July 2012 | (United States) Windham | (Canada) Steve Smith | (Australia) Tracey Hannah |
| 1 July 2012 | (United States) Windham | (United Kingdom) Gee Atherton | (France) Emmeline Ragot |
| 29 July 2012 | (France) Val d'Isère | (New Zealand) Brook MacDonald | (United Kingdom) Rachel Atherton |
| 29 July 2012 | (France) Val d'Isère | (United Kingdom) Gee Atherton | (France) Emmeline Ragot |
| 29 July 2012 | (France) Val d'Isère | (United Kingdom) Josh Bryceland | (France) Floriane Pugin |
| 16 September 2012 | (Norway) Hafjell | (Canada) Steve Smith | (United Kingdom) Rachel Atherton |
| 16 September 2012 | (Norway) Hafjell | (New Zealand) George Brannigan | (France) Emmeline Ragot |
| 16 September 2012 | (Norway) Hafjell | (South Africa) Greg Minnaar | (France) Morgane Charre |
| | | Podium (Men) | Podium (Women) |
| Final Standings | UCI World Cup; Downhill Championship | (United States) Aaron Gwin | (United Kingdom) Rachel Atherton |
| Final Standings | UCI World Cup; Downhill Championship | (South Africa) Greg Minnaar | (France) Emmeline Ragot |
| Final Standings | UCI World Cup; Downhill Championship | (United Kingdom) Gee Atherton | (France) Myriam Nicole |

== See also ==
- 2012 UCI Mountain Bike & Trials World Championships
