= 2011 UCI Mountain Bike World Cup =

Series of races for all-terrain bicyclists

- Date: April–August 2011

The 2011 UCI Mountain Bike World Cup included three disciplines: cross-country, downhill and four-cross.

== Cross-country ==
Date	Venue	Podium (Men)	Podium (Women)
24 April 2011	(South Africa) Pietermaritzburg	(Switzerland) Nino Schurter	(China) Ren Chengyuan
24 April 2011	(South Africa) Pietermaritzburg	(France) Julien Absalon	(France) Julie Bresset
24 April 2011	(South Africa) Pietermaritzburg	(Czech Republic) Jaroslav Kulhavý	(Russia) Irina Kalentieva
22 May 2011	(United Kingdom) Dalby Forest	(Czech Republic) Jaroslav Kulhavý	(France) Julie Bresset
22 May 2011	(United Kingdom) Dalby Forest	(France) Julien Absalon	(Denmark) Annika Langvad
22 May 2011	(United Kingdom) Dalby Forest	(Italy) Marco Aurelio Fontana	(Germany) Sabine Spitz
29 May 2011	(Germany) Offenburg	(France) Julien Absalon	(France) Julie Bresset
29 May 2011	(Germany) Offenburg	(Czech Republic) Jaroslav Kulhavý	(Canada) Catharine Pendrel
29 May 2011	(Germany) Offenburg	(France) Maxime Marotte	(Italy) Eva Lechner
2 July 2011	(Canada) Mont-Sainte-Anne	(Czech Republic) Jaroslav Kulhavý	(Canada) Catharine Pendrel
2 July 2011	(Canada) Mont-Sainte-Anne	(Switzerland) Nino Schurter	(Russia) Irina Kalentieva
2 July 2011	(Canada) Mont-Sainte-Anne	(Spain) José Antonio Hermida	(France) Julie Bresset
10 July 2011	(United States) Windham	(Czech Republic) Jaroslav Kulhavý	(France) Julie Bresset
10 July 2011	(United States) Windham	(Switzerland) Nino Schurter	(Canada) Catharine Pendrel
10 July 2011	(United States) Windham	(Switzerland) Christoph Sauser	(Denmark) Annika Langvad
14 August 2011	(Czech Republic) Nové Město na Moravě	(Czech Republic) Jaroslav Kulhavý	(Canada) Catharine Pendrel
14 August 2011	(Czech Republic) Nové Město na Moravě	(Switzerland) Nino Schurter	(France) Julie Bresset
14 August 2011	(Czech Republic) Nové Město na Moravě	(France) Julien Absalon	(Russia) Irina Kalentieva
21 August 2011	(Italy) Val di Sole	(Czech Republic) Jaroslav Kulhavý	(Canada) Catharine Pendrel
21 August 2011	(Italy) Val di Sole	(Switzerland) Nino Schurter	(Poland) Maja Włoszczowska
21 August 2011	(Italy) Val di Sole	(Switzerland) Florian Vogel	(Norway) Gunn-Rita Dahle Flesjå
		Podium (Men)	Podium (Women)
Final Standings	UCI World Cup; Cross Country Championship	(Czech Republic) Jaroslav Kulhavý	(France) Julie Bresset
Final Standings	UCI World Cup; Cross Country Championship	(Switzerland) Nino Schurter	(Canada) Catharine Pendrel
Final Standings	UCI World Cup; Cross Country Championship	(France) Julien Absalon	(Russia) Irina Kalentieva

== Downhill ==
Date	Venue	Podium (Men)	Podium (Women)
24 April 2011	(South Africa) Pietermaritzburg	(United States) Aaron Gwin	(United Kingdom) Tracy Moseley
24 April 2011	(South Africa) Pietermaritzburg	(South Africa) Greg Minnaar	(United Kingdom) Fionn Griffiths
24 April 2011	(South Africa) Pietermaritzburg	(United Kingdom) Gee Atherton	(France) Emmeline Ragot
5 June 2011	(United Kingdom) Fort William	(South Africa) Greg Minnaar	(United Kingdom) Tracy Moseley
5 June 2011	(United Kingdom) Fort William	(United Kingdom) Danny Hart	(United Kingdom) Rachel Atherton
5 June 2011	(United Kingdom) Fort William	(New Zealand) Brook MacDonald	(France) Floriane Pugin
12 June 2011	(Austria) Leogang	(United States) Aaron Gwin	(France) Floriane Pugin
12 June 2011	(Austria) Leogang	(United Kingdom) Gee Atherton	(United Kingdom) Rachel Atherton
12 June 2011	(Austria) Leogang	(South Africa) Greg Minnaar	(United Kingdom) Tracy Moseley
3 July 2011	(Canada) Mont Sainte Anne	(United States) Aaron Gwin	(United Kingdom) Tracy Moseley
3 July 2011	(Canada) Mont Sainte Anne	(United Kingdom) Josh Bryceland	(France) Floriane Pugin
3 July 2011	(Canada) Mont Sainte Anne	(New Zealand) Brook MacDonald	(United Kingdom) Rachel Atherton
10 July 2011	(United States) Windham	(United States) Aaron Gwin	(United Kingdom) Rachel Atherton
10 July 2011	(United States) Windham	(United Kingdom) Steve Peat	(France) Floriane Pugin
10 July 2011	(United States) Windham	(South Africa) Andrew Neethling	(United Kingdom) Tracy Moseley
7 August 2011	(France) La Bresse	(South Africa) Greg Minnaar	(United Kingdom) Tracy Moseley
7 August 2011	(France) La Bresse	(United Kingdom) Gee Atherton	(France) Floriane Pugin
7 August 2011	(France) La Bresse	(United States) Aaron Gwin	(France) Sabrina Jonnier
21 August 2011	(Italy) Val di Sole	(United States) Aaron Gwin	(France) Myriam Nicole
21 August 2011	(Italy) Val di Sole	(United Kingdom) Danny Hart	(France) Floriane Pugin
21 August 2011	(Italy) Val di Sole	(United Kingdom) Gee Atherton	(United Kingdom) Rachel Atherton
		Podium (Men)	Podium (Women)
Final Standings	UCI World Cup; Downhill Championship	(United States) Aaron Gwin	(United Kingdom) Tracy Moseley
Final Standings	UCI World Cup; Downhill Championship	(South Africa) Greg Minnaar	(France) Floriane Pugin
Final Standings	UCI World Cup; Downhill Championship	(United Kingdom) Gee Atherton	(United Kingdom) Rachel Atherton

== Four-Cross ==
Date	Venue	Podium (Men)	Podium (Women)
23 April 2011	(South Africa) Pietermaritzburg	(Australia) Jared Graves	(Netherlands) Anneke Beerten
23 April 2011	(South Africa) Pietermaritzburg	(Czech Republic) Michal Prokop	(United Kingdom) Fionn Griffiths
23 April 2011	(South Africa) Pietermaritzburg	(Germany) Johannes Fischbach	(France) Céline Gros
4 June 2011	(United Kingdom) Fort William	(Switzerland) Roger Rinderknecht	(Netherlands) Anneke Beerten
4 June 2011	(United Kingdom) Fort William	(Switzerland) David Graf	(United Kingdom) Joey Gough
4 June 2011	(United Kingdom) Fort William	(Czech Republic) Tomas Slavik	(Switzerland) Lucia Oetjen
11 June 2011	(Austria) Leogang	(Australia) Jared Graves	(Czech Republic) Romana Labounková
11 June 2011	(Austria) Leogang	(Switzerland) David Graf	(United States) Melissa Buhl
11 June 2011	(Austria) Leogang	(Czech Republic) Tomas Slavik	(Netherlands) Anneke Beerten
2 July 2011	(Canada) Mont Sainte Anne	(Australia) Jared Graves	(Netherlands) Anneke Beerten
2 July 2011	(Canada) Mont Sainte Anne	(Switzerland) Roger Rinderknecht	(United States) Melissa Buhl
2 July 2011	(Canada) Mont Sainte Anne	(Germany) Guido Tschugg	(United Kingdom) Fionn Griffiths
21 August 2011	(Italy) Val di Sole	(Czech Republic) Tomas Slavik	(Netherlands) Anneke Beerten
21 August 2011	(Italy) Val di Sole	(Germany) Johannes Fischbach	(Switzerland) Lucia Oetjen
21 August 2011	(Italy) Val di Sole	(Czech Republic) Kamil Tatarkovic	(United States) Melissa Buhl
		Podium (Men)	Podium (Women)
Final Standings	UCI World Cup; Four-Cross Championship	(Australia) Jared Graves	(Netherlands) Anneke Beerten
Final Standings	UCI World Cup; Four-Cross Championship	(Switzerland) Roger Rinderknecht	(United States) Melissa Buhl
Final Standings	UCI World Cup; Four-Cross Championship	(Czech Republic) Tomas Slavik	(Switzerland) Lucia Oetjen

== See also ==
- 2011 UCI Mountain Bike & Trials World Championships
