= Jaroslav Kulhavý =

Czech cyclist

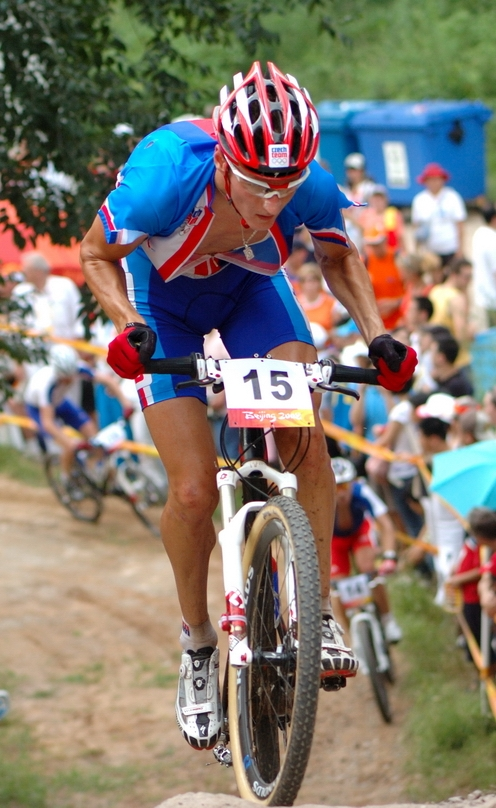
- Kulhavý at the 2008 Summer Olympics

Personal information
- Born: 8 January 1985 (age 41) Ústí nad Orlicí, Czech Republic
- Height: 1.87 m (6 ft 2 in)
- Weight: 76 kg (168 lb)

Cycling career
- Sport: Cycling
- Current team: Specialized Racing
- Discipline: Mountain bike racing
- Role: Rider
- Rider type: Cross-country

Major wins
- Mountain bike Olympic Games XC (2012) World XC Championships (2011) World Marathon Championships (2014) XC World Cup (2011) 9 individual wins (2010, 2011, 2013, 2015) Cape Epic (2013, 2015, 2018)
Medal record
Representing the Czech Republic
Men's mountain bike racing
Olympic Games
| Gold medal – first place | 2012 London | Cross-country |
| Silver medal – second place | 2016 Rio de Janeiro | Cross-country |
World Championships
| Gold medal – first place | 2011 Champery | Cross-country |
| Silver medal – second place | 2010 Mont Sainte-Anne | Cross-country |
| Silver medal – second place | 2016 Nove Mesto | Cross-country |
| Silver medal – second place | 2017 Cairns | Cross-country |
World Cup
| Gold medal – first place | 2011 Overall | Cross-country |
| Bronze medal – third place | 2010 Overall | Cross-country |
| Bronze medal – third place | 2012 Overall | Cross-country |
Men's Mountain bike marathon
World Championships
| Gold medal – first place | 2014 Pietermaritzburg | Men's race |
| Silver medal – second place | 2011 Montello | Men's race |

Jaroslav Kulhavý (Czech pronunciation: [ˈjaroslaf ˈkulɦaviː]; born 8 January 1985 in Ústí nad Orlicí), is a Czech mountain biker

== Career ==
For the first time, he became more aware of himself in 2003, when he became junior champion of the world and Europe. As a result, he also looked at the 2004 Olympics in Athens, but the Olympic race did not finish due to the defect. In 2008 he entered the Elite category and gradually began to overcome the best results of the Czech bikers. At the World Championships in St. Petersburg, Wendel finished eleventh, improving three places to the best Czech result of Miloslav Kvasnička in 1991.In 2009, he finished the 11th European Championship, at the World Cup in Canberra, Australia, the ninth. The medal position in the World Cup race has not been successful yet. In 2010, the first major medal successes came. In July, he won the title of European Champion in Israeli Haifa.At the Olympic Games in Rio in 2016 he defended the gold in the cross country race. Shortly after the start, he entered the front group and gradually formed a leading couple along with Nino Schurter, who was slowly passing by. In the penultimate sixth lap, Kulhavý was unable to respond to the arrival of a Swiss cyclist and a gap grew gradually between the two rivals. Jaroslav Kulhavý, however, watched his second place and won the silver medal.

He won the gold medal in the cross-country event at the 2012 Summer Olympics and the silver medal four years later at the 2016 Summer Olympics. He is the overall winner of the UCI World Cup in 2011, along with taking 3rd place in 2010 and 2012. In 2013 and 2015 Kulhavy partnered with Christoph Sauser to win the Absa Cape Epic mountain bike stage race ("Tour de France of mountain biking") Kulhavy raced the Absa Cape Epic with Sauser again in March, 2017, but their bid for a third win together was foiled by Nino Schurter and Matthias Stirnemann (Scott-Sram), who eventually prevailed by eight minutes. In June 2014 he took the world title in mountain bike marathon. At the Olympic Games in Rio in 2016 he came in second in the cross country race. Shortly after the start, he entered the front group and gradually formed a leading couple along with Nino Schurter, who was slowly passing by. In the penultimate sixth lap, Kulhavý was unable to respond to the arrival of a Switzerland cyclist and a gap grew gradually between the two rivals. Jaroslav Kulhavý, however, watched his second place and won the silver medal.

== Major results ==
2003
1st Cross-country, UCI World Junior Championships
1st Cross-country, UEC European Junior Championships
2007
2nd Cross-country, UEC European Under-23 Championships
3rd Overall UCI Under-23 XCO World Cup
2008
1st Cross-country, National Championships
2010
1st Cross-country, UEC European Championships
1st Marathon, National Championships
2nd Cross-country, UCI World Championships
3rd Overall UCI XCO World Cup

1st Windham
2nd Champéry
3rd Offenburg

2011
1st Cross-country, UCI World Championships
1st Cross-country, UEC European Championships
1st Overall UCI XCO World Cup

1st Dalby Forest
1st Mont-Sainte-Anne
1st Windham
1st Nové Město
1st Val di Sole
2nd Offenburg
3rd Pietermaritzburg

2nd Marathon, UCI World Championships
2012
1st Cross-country, Olympic Games
3rd Overall UCI XCO World Cup

2nd Nové Město
2nd La Bresse
3rd Mont-Sainte-Anne

2013
1st Overall Cape Epic (with Christoph Sauser)
UCI XCO World Cup

1st Hafjell
3rd Albstadt
3rd Val di Sole

2014
1st Marathon, UCI World Championships
2nd Marathon, UEC European Championships
2015
1st Marathon, UEC European Championships
1st Overall Cape Epic (with Christoph Sauser)
2nd Overall UCI XCO World Cup

1st Nové Město
1st Lenzerheide
3rd Albstadt

2016
2nd Cross-country, Olympic Games
2nd Cross-country, UCI World Championships
2017
UCI XCO World Cup

2nd Lenzerheide

2018
1st Overall Cape Epic (with Howard Grotts)
2019
1st Overall Outcast Rider, Cape Epic
2022
1st Marathon, National Championships
3rd Marathon, UEC European Championships

== World Cup of Mountain Bikes XCO ==
| 2013 | Germany | Czech Republic | Italy | Andorra | Canada | Norway | |
| | 3 | 26 | 3 | 34 | 16 | 1 | |
| 2014 | South Africa | Australia | Czech Republic | Germany | Canada | United States | France |
| | 10 | DNF | 87 | 6 | 36 | DNF | 30 |
| 2015 | Czech Republic | Germany | Switzerland | Canada | United States | Italy | |
| | 1 | 3 | 1 | 13 | 32 | 4 | |
