= Julien Absalon =

French cyclist(born 1980)

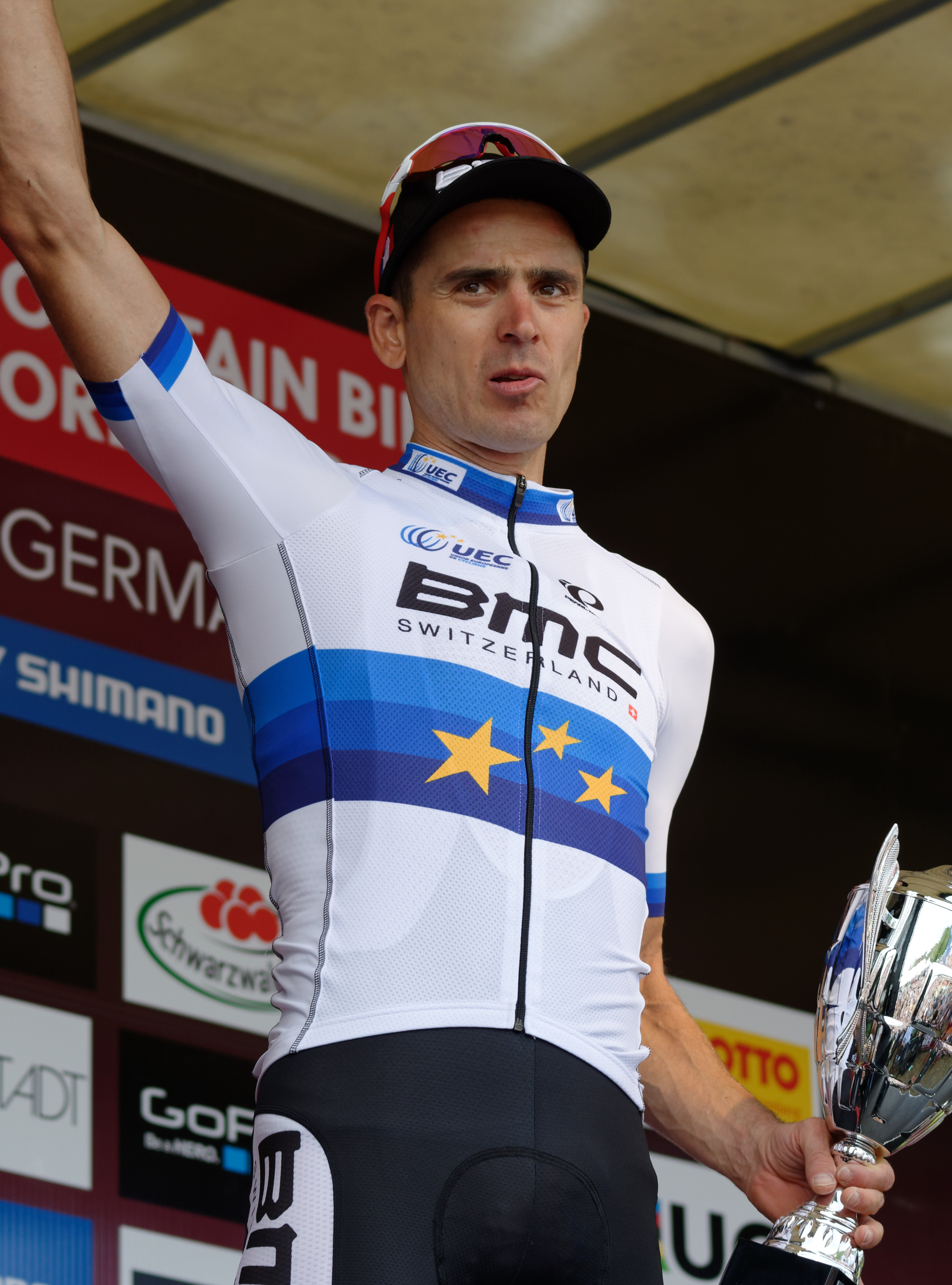
- Absalon at the Albstadt round of the 2016 UCI Mountain Bike World Cup

Personal information
- Full name: Julien Absalon
- Born: 16 August 1980 (age 46) Remiremont, France
- Height: 1.80 m (5 ft 11 in)
- Weight: 70 kg (154 lb)

Cycling career
- Sport: Cycling
- Discipline: Mountain bike racing
- Role: Rider
- Rider type: Cross-country

Amateur team
- 1996–2000: Scott France

Professional teams
- 2001–2006: Bianchi
- 2007–2012: Orbea
- 2013–2018: BMC Mountainbike Racing Team

Major wins
- Mountain bike Olympic Games XC (2004, 2008) World XC Championships (2004, 2005, 2006, 2007, 2014) European XC Championships (2006, 2013, 2014, 2015, 2016) National XC Championships (2003–2016) XC World Cup (2003, 2006–2009, 2014, 2016) 33 individual wins (2001, 2003–2016)
Medal record
Men's mountain bike racing
Representing France
Event	1st	2nd	3rd
Olympic Games	2	0	0
World Championships	5	2	2
World Cup	7	2	3
European Championships	5	4	0
Total	19	8	5
Olympic Games
Gold medal – first place	2004 Athens	Cross-country
Gold medal – first place	2008 Beijing	Cross-country
World Championships
Gold medal – first place	2004 Les Gets	Cross-country
Gold medal – first place	2005 Livigno	Cross-country
Gold medal – first place	2006 Rotorua	Cross-country
Gold medal – first place	2007 Fort William	Cross-country
Gold medal – first place	2014 Hafjell	Cross-country
Silver medal – second place	2009 Canberra	Cross-country
Silver medal – second place	2015 Vallnord	Cross-country
Bronze medal – third place	2011 Champéry	Cross-country
Bronze medal – third place	2016 Nové Město	Cross-country
World Cup
Gold medal – first place	2003 Overall	Cross-country
Gold medal – first place	2006 Overall	Cross-country
Gold medal – first place	2007 Overall	Cross-country
Gold medal – first place	2008 Overall	Cross-country
Gold medal – first place	2009 Overall	Cross-country
Gold medal – first place	2014 Overall	Cross-country
Gold medal – first place	2016 Overall	Cross-country
Silver medal – second place	2010 Overall	Cross-country
Silver medal – second place	2015 Overall	Cross-country
Bronze medal – third place	2005 Overall	Cross-country
Bronze medal – third place	2011 Overall	Cross-country
Bronze medal – third place	2013 Overall	Cross-country
Bronze medal – third place	2019 Leogang	E-MTB Cross-country
European Championships
Gold medal – first place	2006 Lamosano	Cross-country
Gold medal – first place	2013 Bern	Cross-country
Gold medal – first place	2014 St. Wendel	Cross-country
Gold medal – first place	2015 Alpago	Cross-country
Gold medal – first place	2016 Huskvarna	Cross-country
Silver medal – second place	2003 Graz	Cross-country
Silver medal – second place	2005 Kluisbergen	Cross-country
Silver medal – second place	2007 Göreme	Cross-country
Silver medal – second place	2011 Dohňany	Cross-country
Silver medal – second place	2017 Darfo Boario Terme	Cross-country

Julien Arnaud Absalon (born 16 August 1980) is a French former cross-country mountain biker, who competed as a professional from 2001 to 2018. He is considered to be one of the most successful cross-country cyclists of all time. Throughout his career, Absalon won gold medals at the 2004 and 2008 Summer Olympics, five World Championships (2004–2007, 2014), seven UCI World Cup overall titles (2003, 2006–2009, 2014, 2016) and 33 World Cup rounds, which was an all-time record before being broken by Nino Schurter in 2023. He also won all fourteen French cross-country championships between 2003 and 2016, and five European Championships (2006, 2013–2016).

== Career highlights ==
Source: 2003: Absalon won his first UCI Mountain Bike World Cup.

2004: Gold at World Champions and the Athens Olympic Games.

2005: Absalon again won the World Championships.

2006: Winner at the World Championships, European Championships, French Championships and the overall World Cup.

2007: World Champion and World Cup Champion

2008: Won 2nd Gold Medal at the Beijing Olympic Games, World Cup Champion

2009: Number 1 World Ranking for all but 5 days of the year. Winner of UCI MTB World Cup for the 5th time, silver at the World Championships

2010: 2nd Overall at World Championships

2011: 3rd at the World Championships and World Cup

2012: At the 2012 Summer Olympics cross-country race, he suffered a tyre puncture in the opening lap. After changing tyre and noticing that he was trailing the leader by 55 seconds, he decided to abandon the race, seeing that his chances of winning a medal had disappeared.

2013: Won European Championships

2014: Wins 5th World Championship title, French and European Championships. His season was cut short when, that November, he suffered a broken collarbone during a cyclocross race.

2015: Absalon wins the European Championships, French Championships, and finished second overall in the World Championships. Completed the season ranked world number 1.

2016: Finishes the Rio Olympic Games in 8th place.

== Major results ==
1998
1st Cross-country, UCI World Junior Championships
1st Cross-country, UEC European Junior Championships
1st Cross-country, National Junior Championships
1999
2nd Cross-country, UEC European Under-23 Championships
2nd Cross-country, National Under-23 Championships
5th Cross-country, UCI World Under-23 Championships
2000
2nd Team relay, UCI World Championships
4th Cross-country, UCI World Under-23 Championships
2001
1st Cross-country, UCI World Under-23 Championships
UCI XCO World Cup

1st Durango

1st Cross-country, UEC European Under-23 Championships
1st Team relay, UEC European Championships
1st Cross-country, National Under-23 Championships
2002
1st Cross-country, UCI World Under-23 Championships
1st Cross-country, UEC European Under-23 Championships
1st Cross-country, National Under-23 Championships
2nd Team relay, UCI World Championships
2003
1st Cross-country, National Championships
1st Overall UCI XCO World Cup

1st Mont-Sainte-Anne
3rd Kaprun
3rd Sankt Wendel
3rd Fort William
3rd Grouse Mountain

2nd Cross-country, UEC European Championships
2004
1st Cross-country, Olympic Games
1st Cross-country, UCI World Championships
1st Cross-country, National Championships
UCI XCO World Cup

1st Schladming
3rd Houffalize
3rd Madrid

5th Cross-country, UEC European Championships
2005
1st Cross-country, UCI World Championships
1st Cross-country, National Championships
2nd Cross-country, UEC European Championships
3rd Overall UCI XCO World Cup

1st Spa-Francorchamps
1st Madrid
3rd Willingen

2006
1st Cross-country, UCI World Championships
1st Cross-country, National Championships
1st Overall UCI XCO World Cup

1st Spa-Francorchamps
1st Fort William
1st Madrid
2nd Curaçao
3rd Mont-Sainte-Anne

2007
1st Cross-country, UCI World Championships
1st Cross-country, National Championships
1st Overall UCI XCO World Cup

1st Saint-Félicien
1st Offenburg
1st Mont-Sainte-Anne
1st Champéry
2nd Houffalize

2nd Cross-country, UEC European Championships
2008
1st Cross-country, Olympic Games
1st Cross-country, National Championships
1st Overall UCI XCO World Cup

1st Madrid
1st Mont-Sainte-Anne
1st Houffalize
1st Offenburg
1st Bromont

2009
1st Cross-country, National Championships
1st Overall UCI XCO World Cup

1st Madrid
1st Mont-Sainte-Anne
1st Houffalize
1st Offenburg
2nd Champéry
2nd Pietermaritzburg

2nd Cross-country, UCI World Championships
2010
1st Cross-country, National Championships
2nd Overall UCI XCO World Cup

1st Offenburg
2nd Val di Sole
2nd Dalby Forest

5th Cross-country, UCI World Championships
2011
1st Cross-country, National Championships
2nd Cross-country, UEC European Championships
3rd Cross-country, UCI World Championships
3rd Overall UCI XCO World Cup

1st Offenburg
2nd Pietermaritzburg
2nd Dalby Forest
3rd Nové Město

2012
1st Cross-country, National Championships
UCI XCO World Cup

1st Houffalize
1st La Bresse

4th Cross-country, UCI World Championships
4th Cross-country, UEC European Championships
2013
1st Cross-country, UEC European Championships
1st Cross-country, National Championships
3rd Overall UCI XCO World Cup

1st Mont-Sainte-Anne
2nd Nové Město
2nd Val di Sole

2014
1st Cross-country, UCI World Championships
1st Cross-country, UEC European Championships
1st Cross-country, National Championships
1st Overall UCI XCO World Cup

1st Pietermaritzburg
1st Cairns
1st Albstadt
2nd Mont-Sainte-Anne
2nd Méribel
2nd Windham

2015
1st Cross-country, UEC European Championships
1st Cross-country, National Championships
2nd Cross-country, UCI World Championships
2nd Overall UCI XCO World Cup

1st Albstadt
2nd Val di Sole
2nd Windham
2nd Mont-Sainte-Anne
3rd Nové Město

2016
1st Cross-country, UEC European Championships
1st Cross-country, National Championships
1st Overall UCI XCO World Cup

1st La Bresse
1st Vallnord
1st Mont-Sainte-Anne
2nd Albstadt
2nd Lenzerheide
3rd Cairns

3rd Cross-country, UCI World Championships
2017
2nd Cross-country, UEC European Championships
UCI XCO World Cup

3rd Nové Město
3rd Vallnord

2018
1st Cross-country, National E-MTB Championships
2019
2nd Cross-country, National E-MTB Championships
3rd Cross-country, UCI World E-MTB Championships
