= Rachel Atherton =

English cyclist

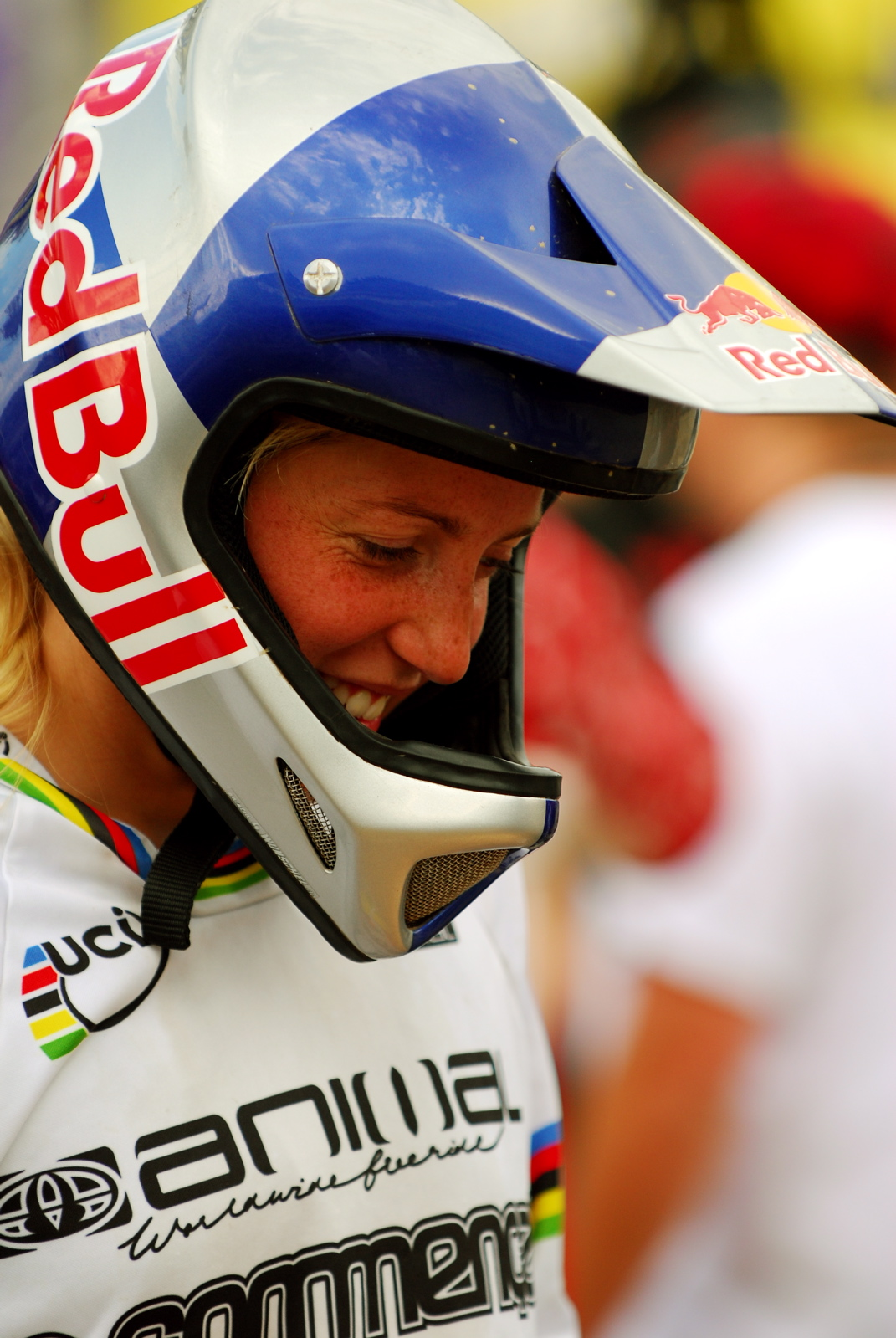
- Rachel Atherton in August 2008

Personal information
- Full name: Rachel Laura Atherton
- Nickname: Waynehead
- Born: 6 December 1987 (age 38) Salisbury, England, United Kingdom
- Height: 1.70 m (5 ft 7 in)
- Weight: 65 kg (143 lb)

Cycling career
- Sport: Cycling
- Current team: Atherton Racing
- Disciplines: BMX & MTB
- Role: Rider
- Rider type: DH

Professional teams
- 2007–2011: Animal Commençal
- 2011–2015: GT
- 2015–2018: Trek Factory Racing
- 2018–: Atherton Bikes

Major wins
- DH World Champion (x5); DH World Cup (x6 overall, 40 rounds); DH European Champion; DH National Champion (x6); DH Junior World Champion; DH Junior European Champion
Medal record
Women's mountain bike racing
Representing Great Britain
World Championships
Gold medal – first place	2008 Val Di Sol	Downhill
Gold medal – first place	2013 Pietermaritzburg	Downhill
Gold medal – first place	2015 Vallnord	Downhill
Gold medal – first place	2016 Val di Sole	Downhill
Gold medal – first place	2018 Lenzerheide	Downhill
Silver medal – second place	2007 Fort William	Downhill
Silver medal – second place	2011 Champery	Downhill
Silver medal – second place	2014 Hafjell	Downhill
Bronze medal – third place	2006 Rotorua	Downhill
Gold medal – first place	2005 Livigno	Downhill (junior)
Silver medal – second place	2004 Les Gets	Downhill (junior)

Rachel Laura Atherton (born 6 December 1987) is a British professional downhill mountain bike racer, and is a multiple time UCI World Champion.

Atherton began riding BMX at the age of 8 and mountain biking at the age of 11. She was both Sunday Times' Sportswoman of the Year and BBC Midlands Junior Sportswoman of the Year in 2005, and then BBC Midlands Sportswoman of the Year in 2008. In October 2015, a video of Atherton overtaking 91 competitors in five minutes during a race went viral.

== Career ==
For 5 years from 2007, Atherton was part of the Animal Commençal race team along with brothers Dan Atherton and Gee Atherton. In 2012, Atherton, along with her brothers Dan, Gee and Marc Beaumont, signed with GT Bicycles. In 2015, Atherton and her brothers signed with Trek Bicycle Corporation to race for Trek Atherton Racing.

In June 2008 Atherton became the first British woman to win the Elite UCI Downhill World Championship, defeating second placed Sabrina Jonnier by 11.99 seconds in the final.

Atherton was involved in a collision with a pickup truck whilst on a time trial training ride with her brothers Dan and Gee in Santa Cruz, California, on 18 January 2009. She sustained a dislocated shoulder which, after later needing a nerve graft, ruled her out of the 2009 racing season, including the September World Championships in Canberra.

In September 2012, Atherton took the final World Cup round on a diverse and testing Norwegian track and clinched the overall title, despite missing the opening race of the season. The Norwegian race was the final round of a seven-round series in which Atherton claimed a win in 5 of the 6 events she raced.

In June 2016, Atherton became the first woman to win 10 consecutive rounds of the World Cup, surpassing the record previously held by Anne-Caroline Chausson. In September that same year, she also achieved the unprecedented feat of winning every round in a World Cup season.

In 2019, Atherton suffered an injury to her Achilles tendon during a practice session, necessitating a prolonged period of recovery that sidelined her for the entirety of the 2020 season opener.

In 2023, Atherton made a comeback to competitive riding at the UCI Downhill World Cup in Lenzerheide, clinching the first-place victory.

== Personal life ==
Atherton keeps the rainbow jerseys she won for being world champion in a birdcage, so that she can "take them out, touch them and remember those races.".

Atherton is married and has two daughters, born in 2021 and 2026.

== Palmarès ==
2002
1st British National Mountain Biking Championships (DH) – Youth
2004
1st British National Mountain Biking Championships (DH)
2nd UCI Mountain Bike & Trials World Championships (DH) – Junior
2005
1st British National Mountain Biking Championships (DH)
1st UCI Mountain Bike & Trials World Championships (DH) – Junior
1st European Mountain Bike Championships (DH) - Junior
2006
1st European Mountain Bike Championships (DH)
1st Lisboa Downtown Championships
3rd Overall UCI Mountain Bike World Cup (DH)

1st Round 5 (Balneário Camboriú, Brazil)

2nd British National Mountain Biking Championships (DH)
3rd UCI Mountain Bike & Trials World Championships (DH)
2007
1st UCI Mountain Bike World Cup (DH), Round 5 (Maribor, Slovenia)
1st Maxxis Cup DH Round 1
1st Sea Otter Classic
1st NPS DH, Round 1
1st NPS DH, Round 3 (Moelfre)
1st NPS DH, Round 4 (Caersws)
1st Fat Face Night Race
1st Street Race, Edinburgh
2nd UCI Mountain Bike & Trials World Championships (DH)
2nd NPS DH, Round 5 (Innerleithen)
3rd DS, Sea Otter Classic
2008
1st UCI Mountain Bike & Trials World Championships (DH)
1st Overall UCI Mountain Bike World Cup (DH)

2nd Round 1 (Maribor, Slovenia)
1st Round 2 (Vallnord, Andorra)
3rd Round 3 (Fort William, Scotland)
1st Round 4 (Mont-Sainte-Anne, Canada)
1st Round 5 (Bromont, Canada)
2nd Round 6 (Canberra, Australia)
1st Round 7 (Schladming, Austria)

1st Maxxis Cup DH (Gouveia, Portugal)
1st Alpine Bikes Winter series DH (Scotland)
1st Canadian Open DH (Whistler, Canada)
1st Monster Energy Garbanzo Downhill (Whistler, Canada)
2010
UCI Mountain Bike World Cup (DH)

1st Round 1 (Maribor, Slovenia)
2nd Round 2 (Fort William, Scotland)
1st Round 6 (Windham, United States)

2011
2nd UCI Mountain Bike & Trials World Championships (DH)
3rd Overall UCI Mountain Bike World Cup (DH)

2nd Round 2 (Fort William, Scotland)
2nd Round 3 (Leogang, Austria)
3rd Round 4 (Mont-Sainte-Anne, Canada)
1st Round 5 (Windham, United States)
3rd Round 7 (Val di Sole, Italy)

2012
1st British National Mountain Biking Championships (DH)
1st Overall UCI Mountain Bike World Cup (DH)

1st Round 2 (Val di Sole, Italy)
2nd Round 3 (Fort William, Scotland)
1st Round 4 (Mont-Sainte-Anne, Canada)
1st Round 5 (Windham, United States)
1st Round 6 (Val d'Isère, France)
1st Round 7 (Hafjell, Norway)

1st European Downhill Cup round 1 (Monte Tamaro, Switzerland)
1st European Downhill Cup round 2 (Leogang, Austria)
2nd British Downhill Series, Round 1 (Combe Sydenham, England)
2nd British Downhill Series, Round 2 (Fort William, Scotland)
2013
1st UCI Mountain Bike & Trials World Championships (DH)
1st Overall UCI Mountain Bike World Cup (DH)

1st Round 1 (Fort William, Scotland)
1st Round 2 (Val di Sole, Italy)
1st Round 3 (Vallnord, Andorra)
2nd Round 4 (Mont-Sainte-Anne, Canada)
1st Round 5 (Hafjell, Norway)
2nd Round 6 (Leogang, Austria)

2014
2nd UCI Mountain Bike & Trials World Championships (DH)
2nd Overall UCI Mountain Bike World Cup (DH)

2nd Round 1 (Pietermaritzburg, South Africa)
1st Round 2 (Cairns, Australia)
2nd Round 4 (Leogang, Austria)
2nd Round 5 (Mont-Sainte-Anne, Canada)
2nd Round 6 (Windham, United States)
1st Round 7 (Méribel, France)

2015
1st UCI Mountain Bike & Trials World Championships (DH)
1st British National Mountain Biking Championships (DH)
1st Overall UCI Mountain Bike World Cup (DH)

2nd Round 1 (Lourdes, France)
1st Round 2 (Fort William, Scotland)
1st Round 3 (Leogang, Austria)
1st Round 4 (Lenzerheide, Switzerland)
1st Round 5 (Mont-Sainte-Anne, Canada)
1st Round 6 (Windham, United States)
1st Round 7 (Val di Sole, Italy)

1st British Downhill Series, Round 2 (Fort William, Scotland)
2016
1st UCI Mountain Bike & Trials World Championships (DH)
1st British National Mountain Biking Championships (DH)
1st Overall UCI Mountain Bike World Cup (DH)

1st Round 1 (Lourdes, France)
1st Round 2 (Cairns, Australia)
1st Round 3 (Fort William, Scotland)
1st Round 4 (Leogang, Austria)
1st Round 5 (Lenzerheide, Switzerland)
1st Round 6 (Mont-Sainte-Anne, Canada)
1st Round 7 (Vallnord, Andorra)

2017
1st British National Mountain Biking Championships (DH)
UCI Mountain Bike World Cup (DH)

1st Round 1 (Lourdes, France)
2nd Round 5 (Lenzerheide, Switzerland)

2018
1st UCI Mountain Bike World Championships (DH)
1st Overall UCI Mountain Bike World Cup (DH)

2nd Round 1 (Lošinj, Croatia)
3rd Round 2 (Fort William, Scotland)
1st Round 3 (Leogang, Austria)
2nd Round 4 (Val di Sole, Italy)
2nd Round 5 (Vallnord, Andorra)
1st Round 6 (Mont-Sainte-Anne, Canada)
1st Round 7 (La Bresse, France)

2019
UCI Mountain Bike World Cup (DH)

2nd Round 1 (Maribor, Slovenia)
1st Round 2 (Fort William, Scotland)
1st Round 4 (Vallnord, Andorra)

2023
UCI Mountain Bike World Cup (DH)

1st Round 1 (Lenzerheide, Switzerland)
