= Aaron Gwin =

American racing cyclist

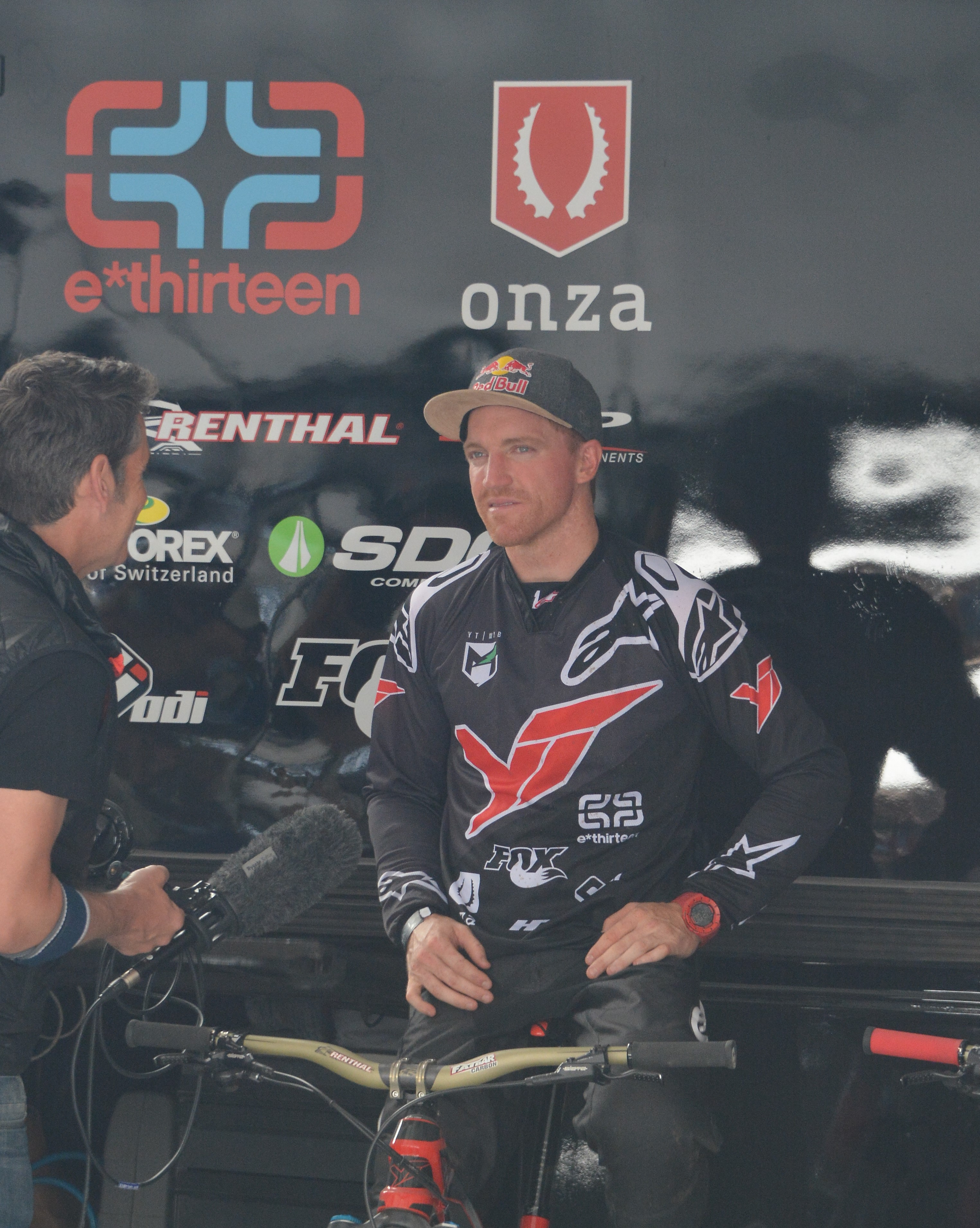
- Five time UCI MTB DH World Cup Champion

Personal information
- Full name: Aaron Holmes Gwin
- Born: December 24, 1987 (age 38) San Bernardino, California
- Height: 178 cm (5 ft 10 in)
- Weight: 90 kg (198 lb)

Cycling career
- Sport: Cycling
- Current team: Gwin Racing
- Discipline: Downhill mountain biking
- Rider type: Downhill

Professional teams
- 2008-2010: Yeti Cycles
- 2011-2012: Trek World Racing
- 2013-2015: Specialized Gravity
- 2016-2018: The YT Mob
- 2019-2023: Intense Factory Racing
- 2024- 2025: Gwin Racing
- 2026 -: Frameworks Racing

Major wins
- UCI Downhill World Cup Champion (x5); USAC Downhill National Champion (x8)

Aaron Holmes Gwin (born December 24, 1987) is an American professional downhill mountain biker from Morongo Valley, California. He is a five-time World Cup overall champion.

== Race career ==
Aaron Gwin started his cycling career racing BMX from the age of 4. By age 8, Gwin was racing at a national level. At age 12, Gwin moved on to motocross and raced up until he was 17, when he quit due to constant injuries. In 2008, at age 20, Gwin was loaned a bike by fellow professional downhill racer and good friend Cody Warren and was encouraged to compete in a race. In his first race in the Fontana Winter Series, he placed 3rd, and began racing from then on, quickly signing with Yeti Cycles. He became well known for breaking into the international World Cup scene after only 8 months of riding downhill.

Many saw Gwin as the savior for US downhill racing on the international scene, since his 10th-place finish at the Mont Sainte-Anne World Cup in 2008 was the first American top 10 finish since 2004. He has since won eight United States National Championships for Downhill, in 2009, 2010, 2012, 2013, 2014, 2015, 2016, and 2017.

In 2011 and 2012, Gwin dominated the UCI World Cup downhill series. Gwin won 5 out of 7 World Cup races in 2011, and finished 13th at the UCI World Championships in Champery. In 2012, Gwin once again dominated the circuit, taking first place in 4 out of 6 World Cup races. He finished in 128th at World Championships in Leogang.

The year 2013 was a disappointing one for Gwin, with unexpected poor results culminating in an accident involving a tree at the World Championships.

In 2014, Gwin's racing improved from 2013, although with only one 1st in the World Cup along with the USA National Championships. His racing showed recovery from his 2013 setbacks, but suffered several mechanical accidents, such as his run in Leogang at the UCI MTB World Cup in 2014, where he suffered a flat tire as he left the start gate, which resulted in the tire coming off of the rim; or his 2015 race run at the Leogang UCI MTB World Cup where his chain broke on the start line, and he raced without pedaling for his race run, managing to hold his speed and win the race.

== Riding style ==
Much of Gwin's style and skill come from his motocross experience. His BMX racing experience has also contributed to his ability to ride smoothly, bringing him success in Dual Slalom and Mountain Cross.

== Teams ==
Gwin was sponsored in 2008 by Yeti Cycles. He left the Yeti team in November 2010 to join the Trek World Racing Team after relocating to Temecula, CA. During his time at Trek World Racing, he won two World Cup Overall titles, in 2011 and 2012. On January 7, 2013, it was announced that Aaron would be riding for Specialized Racing, replacing Sam Hill on the team. His teammate at Specialized was Troy Brosnan.

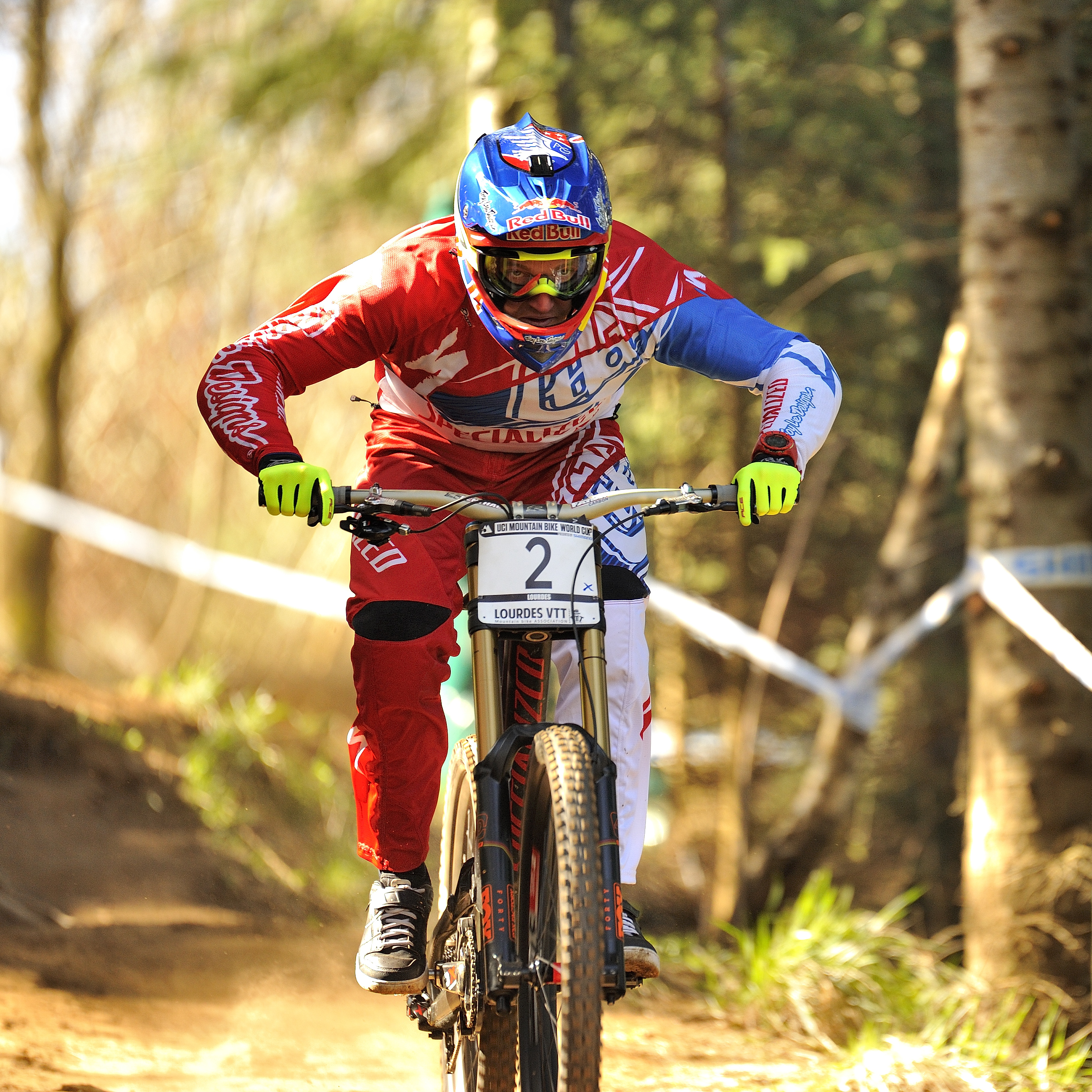
Aaron Gwin racing at Lourdes (2015 World Cup 1st round)

After a successful season with Specialized, Gwin announced that he would be leaving the big brand to ride for up and coming brand YT Industries for the 2016 season. In 2019, Gwin signed with Intense Factory Racing. In 2024, Gwin left Intense Factory Racing and formed an independent team, Gwin Factory Racing. In 2026 Gwin joined Neko Mullay's Frameworks Racing, signing a two year contract with an optional third year extension. He'll be racing with and mentoring first year elite athlete, Asa Vermette.

== Results ==
2008

10th place, Sea Otter Classic Downhill
7th place, MSC #2 Chalk Creek Stampede Mountain Cross
1st place, MSC #2 Chalk Creek Stampede Dual Slalom
4th place, Deer Valley National Dual Slalom
4th place, Deer Valley National Downhill
1st place, MSC #5 Blast the Mass Downhill

10th place, 2008 UCI Mountain Bike World Cup #4 Mont Sainte-Anne, Quebec Canada
34th place, 2008 UCI Mountain Bike World Cup #5 Bromont, Quebec, Canada

1st place, MSC #7 Snowmass G3 Downhill
1st place, MSC #9 MSC Gravity Finals Downhill

8th place, 2008 UCI Mountain Bike World Cup #8 Schladming, Austria

2009
17th place, 2009 UCI Mountain Bike World Cup #1 Pietermaritzburg, South Africa
14th place, 2009 UCI Mountain Bike World Cup #2 La Bresse France
16th place, 2009 UCI Mountain Bike World Cup #3 Vallnord Andorra
9th place, 2009 UCI Mountain Bike World Cup #4 Fort William, Scotland
14th place, 2009 UCI Mountain Bike World Cup #5 Maribor Slovenia
1st place, USAC National Downhill Championships, Sol Vista Colorado United States
3rd place, 2009 UCI Mountain Bike World Cup #6 Mont Sainte-Anne, Quebec, Canada
5th place, 2009 UCI Mountain Bike World Cup #7 Bromont, Quebec, Canada

1st place, MSC #3 Blast the Mass Downhill, Snowmass Village, Colorado, United States

21st place, 2009 UCI Mountain Bike World Championships Stromlo, Canberra, Australia
4th place, 2009 UCI Mountain Bike World Cup #8 Schladming, Austria

2010

2nd place, Sea Otter Classic Downhill

7th place, 2010 UCI Mountain Bike World Cup #1 Maribor, Slovenia

1st place, IXS German Cup, Winterberg, Germany

4th place, 2010 UCI Mountain Bike World Cup #2 Fort William, Scotland
3rd place, 2010 UCI Mountain Bike World Cup #3 Leogang, Austria

24th place, MSC #3 Blast the Mass Downhill, Snowmass Village, Colorado, United States
1st place, MSC #4 Blast the Mass Downhill, Snowmass Village, Colorado, United States

1st place, USAC National Downhill Championships, Sol Vista Colorado United States
8th place, 2010 UCI Mountain Bike World Cup #4 Champéry [Switzerland]
14th place, 2010 UCI Mountain Bike World Cup #5 Val di Sole, [Italy]
4th place, 2010 UCI Mountain Bike World Cup #6 Windham, New York State, United States
4th place, 2010 UCI Mountain Bike World Championships Mont Sainte-Anne, Quebec, Canada

2011
1st place overall for the 2011 UCI Mountain Bike World Cup Series, the first American to ever win a World Cup Overall Title and the first man to win 5 World Cup DH races in one season:
1st place, 2011 UCI Mountain Bike World Cup #1 Pietermaritzburg, South Africa
5th place, 2011 UCI Mountain Bike World Cup #2 Fort William, Scotland
1st place, 2011 UCI Mountain Bike World Cup #3 Leogang, Austria
1st place, 2011 UCI Mountain Bike World Cup #4 Mont Sainte-Anne, Quebec
1st place, 2011 UCI Mountain Bike World Cup #5 Windham, New York, USA
3rd place, 2011 UCI Mountain Bike World Cup #6 La Bresse, FRA
1st place, 2011 UCI Mountain Bike World Cup #7 Val di Sole, ITA

1st place, US Open

2012
1st place overall for the 2012 UCI Mountain Bike World Cup Series
2nd place, 2012 UCI Mountain Bike World Cup #1 Pietermaritzburg, South Africa

3rd place, Sea Otter Classic Downhill
2nd place, Port Angeles Grand Prix Downhill

1st place, 2012 UCI Mountain Bike World Cup #2 Val Di Sole, Italy
1st place, 2012 UCI Mountain Bike World Cup #3 Fort William, Scotland
1st place, 2012 UCI Mountain Bike World Cup #4 Mont Saint Anne, Canada
1st place, 2012 UCI Mountain Bike World Cup #5 Windham, United States
5th place, 2012 UCI Mountain Bike World Cup #6 Val D'Isere, France (After this race he clinched his 2nd UCI Mountain Bike World Cup championship)
83rd place, Leogang, UCI MTB World Championships 2012 Austria
DNF, 2012 UCI Mountain Bike World Cup #7 Hafjell Bike Park, Norway

2013

1st place, Sea Otter Classic Downhill Monterey, California, United States

20th place, 2013 UCI Mountain Bike World Cup #1 Fort William,
6th place, 2013 UCI Mountain Bike World Cup #2 Val di Sole, [Italy]
10th place, 2013 UCI Mountain Bike World Cup #3 Vallnord Andorra
1st place, USAC National Downhill Pro Championships, Angel Fire New Mexico United States
5th place, 2013 UCI Mountain Bike World Cup #4 Mont Saint Anne, Canada
67th place, UCI MTB World Championships 2013 Pietermaritzburg, South Africa

2014
1st place, 2014 UCI Mountain Bike World Cup #1 Pietermaritzburg, South Africa
4th place, 2014 UCI Mountain Bike World Cup #2 Cairns, Australia
4th place, 2014 UCI Mountain Bike World Cup #3 Fort William,
78thplace, 2014 UCI Mountain Bike World Cup #4 Leogang, Austria
1st place, USAC National Downhill Pro Championships, Angel Fire New Mexico United States
6th place, 2014 UCI Mountain Bike World Cup #5 Mont Saint-Anne, Canada
2nd place, 2014 UCI Mountain Bike World Cup #6 Windham, New York State, United States
6th place, 2014 UCI Mountain Bike World Cup #7 Meribel, France
14th place, UCI MTB World Championships 2014 Hafjell Bike Park, Norway

2015
1st place overall for the 2015 UCI Mountain Bike World Cup Series
1st place, 2015 UCI Mountain Bike World Cup #1 Lourdes, France

1st place, Sea Otter Classic Downhill Monterey, California, United States

2nd place, 2015 UCI Mountain Bike World Cup #2 Fort William,
1st place, 2015 UCI Mountain Bike World Cup #3 Leogang, Austria
8th place, 2015 UCI Mountain Bike World Cup #4 Lenzerheide switzerland
1st place, USAC National Downhill Pro Championships, Mammouth California United States
7th place, 2015 UCI Mountain Bike World Cup #5 Mont Saint-Anne, Canada
1st place, 2015 UCI Mountain Bike World Cup #6 Windham, New York State, United States
1st place, 2015 UCI Mountain Bike World Cup #7 Val di Sole, [Italy]

2016
1st place, Overall for the 2016 UCI Mountain Bike World Cup
1st place, 2016 UCI Mountain Bike World Cup #1 Lourdes, France
4th place, 2016 UCI Mountain Bike World Cup #2 Cairns, Australia
2nd place, 2016 UCI Mountain Bike World Cup #3 Fort William, Scotland
1st place, 2016 UCI Mountain Bike World Cup #4 Leogang, Austria
2nd place, 2016 UCI Mountain Bike World Cup #6 Mont Sainte-Anne, Quebec
1st place, National Mountain Bike Championships - Downhill
55th place, 2016 UCI Mountain Bike World Cup #7 Vallnord, Andorra

2017
1st place overall for the 2017 UCI Mountain Bike World Cup Series
DQ, 2017 UCI Mountain Bike World Cup #1 Lourdes, France
3rd place, 2017 UCI Mountain Bike World Cup #2 Fort William,
1st place, 2017 UCI Mountain Bike World Cup #3 Leogang, Austria,
5th place, 2017 UCI Mountain Bike World Cup #4 Vallnord Andorra,
51st place, 2017 UCI Mountain Bike World Cup #5 Lenzerheide switzerland,
1st place, 2017 USAC National Downhill Pro Championships Snowshoe West Virginia United States
1st place, 2017 UCI Mountain Bike World Cup #6 Mont Saint Anne, Canada
1st place, 2017 UCI Mountain Bike World Cup #7 Val di Sole, [Italy]
3rd place, 2017 UCI Mountain Bike World Championships Cairns, [Australia]
2018
1st place, Mercedes-Benz UCI Mountain Bike Downhill World Cup Lošinj 2018
