= Malghetto Lakes =

Lakes in Val di Sole, Italy

- Location: Mezzana, Trentino, Trentino-Alto Adige/Südtirol, Italy
- Coordinates: 46°16′39″N 10°48′36″E

The Malghetto Lakes are two lakes of glacial origin located in Val di Sole, in the municipality of Mezzana.

== Morphology ==
With the end of the Würm glaciation, moraine deposits retained the meltwater from the glacier that overlooked the area upstream. The main lakes found in the Malghetto locality are the Low Malghetto lake and the Upper Malghetto lake. Both are of glacial origin and were created by a moraine barrage.

One can reach the Panciana Valley, Malghette Lake (m. 1891), by taking a different route.

== Naturalistic aspects ==
The lakes have attracted the interest of naturalists and limnologists since at least the early 20th century when some diatom species were found there and studied with those found in Lago di Tovel.

== Activities ==
The lakes during the winter period become covered with ice and are suitable for winter sports. During the summer period, they are tourist excursion destinations and are also suitable for sport fishing.

== Bibliography ==
- Gorfer, Aldo (1975). Le valli del Trentino-Trentino occidentale [The valleys of western Trentino] (in Italian). Calliano (Trento): Manfrini. ISBN 978-88-7024-118-1.
- Bezzi, Quirino; Covi, Italo; Scaglia, Antonio (2005). Valle di Sole (in Italian). Trento: Panorama. ISBN 9788873890683.
