= Laurie Greenland =

British mountain biker

Personal information
- Born: 18 February 1997 (age 29)

Cycling career
- Sport: Cycling
- Current team: Santa Cruz Syndicate
- Discipline: Downhill
- Role: Rider
Medal record
Representing Great Britain
Mountain bike racing
World Championships
Gold medal – first place	2015 Vallnord	Junior downhill
Silver medal – second place	2016 Val di Sole	Downhill
Silver medal – second place	2014 Hajfell	Junior downhill

Laurie Greenland (born 18 February 1997) is a British downhill mountain biker. In 2016, he finished second at the UCI Downhill World Championships in Val di Sole, Italy. He also won round 6 of the 2019 UCI Mountain Bike World Cup in Val di Sole, Italy.

Laurie Greenland has raced for Pysclewerx (2009 to 2013), Team Wideopenmountainbike.com (2013), Trek World Racing (2014, 2015), MS Mondraker Team (2016 - 2021), SC Syndicate (joined 2022). He was signed as a Red Bull athlete in 2019.

Greenland raced his first UCI Mountain Bike World Cup at Cairns, Australia, 2014.

In 2021, Greenland designed and opened the "Vanta" trail at BikePark Wales.

Notable results include:

- UK DH National Champion, Junior (Innerleithen, 2014)
- 1st UCI DH World Cup, Junior (Lenzerheide, 2015)
- 1st UCI DH World Cup, Junior (Windham, 2015)
- 1st UCI DH World Cup, Junior (Val Di Sole, 2015)
- UCI Junior DH World Champion (Vallnord, 2015)
- 2nd UCI DH World Championships (Val Di Sole, 2016)
- 2nd UCI DH World Cup (Val Di Sole, 2018)
- 3rd UCI DH World Cup (Les Gets, 2019)
- 1st UCI DH World Cup (Val Di Sole, 2019)
- 2nd Red Bull Hardline (2021)
