= Catharine Pendrel =

Canadian cross-country mountain biker

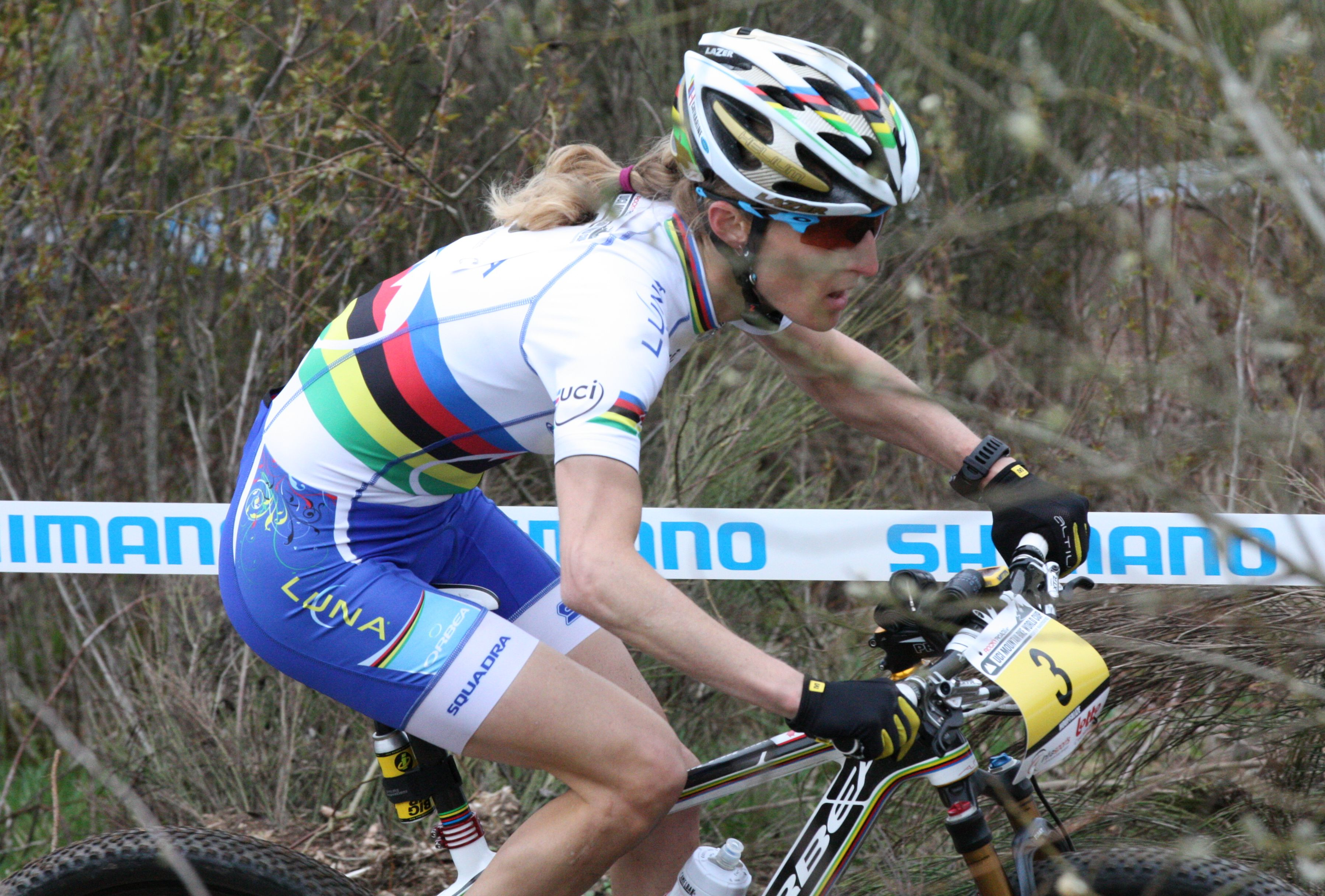
- Pendrel at the World Cup in Houffalize (Belgium) on April 15, 2012

Personal information
- Born: September 30, 1980 (age 46) Fredericton , New Brunswick
- Height: 5 ft 5 in (165 cm)
- Weight: 50 kg (110 lb)

Cycling career
- Sport: Cycling
- Current team: Luna Chix Pro Team
- Discipline: Mountain bike racing
- Role: Rider
- Rider type: Cross-country

Amateur team
- Norco Factory

Professional team
- 2008–: Luna Chix Pro Team
Medal record
Women's cycling
Representing Canada
Olympic Games
Bronze medal – third place	2016 Rio de Janeiro	Cross-country
World Championships
Gold medal – first place	2011 Champery	Cross-country
Gold medal – first place	2014 Hafjell	Cross-country
Commonwealth Games
Gold medal – first place	2014 Glasgow	Cross-country
Pan American Games
Gold medal – first place	2007 Rio de Janeiro	Cross-country
Silver medal – second place	2015 Toronto	Cross-country

Catharine Pendrel (born September 30, 1980) is a Canadian cross-country mountain biker from Harvey, New Brunswick. A member of the Canadian National team since 2004, Pendrel was the world champion in cross-country mountain biking in 2011 and 2014 and the 2007 Pan American Games champion. She is also the current reigning Commonwealth Games champion when she won gold in Glasgow. Additionally, Pendrel is the 2010 World Cup Champion as well as the winner of the 2012 UCI and 2016 World Cup Series. She won a bronze medal at the 2016 Summer Olympics in Rio de Janeiro.

== Career ==
Pendrel was a competitive horse rider in eventing prior to selecting mountain biking as her primary sport. Her brother Geoff Pendrel is an elite downhill mountain bike racer. He introduced her to the sport as a child through the trails he built on their horse farm. Pendrel's first race was on a bike borrowed from her brother. She noted that she got into mountain biking because she "sucked at all the school sports." She recounts that her first rides on her bike were often quite nervous ones ruled by fear, especially on descents where she would walk her bike down, she said that "what I remember from starting is falling and crashing a lot."

She then headed from the East Coast to the West Coast where she began riding at the University of Victoria. There she had to convince future coach Dan Proulx into taking her on, as he was quoted "Catharine and I often joke because, no, I didn't see (world champion potential) in her at first. It took a lot of persistence and hard work over time. She had to bug me a bit to get me to coach her at first and luckily it all worked out. It just goes to show you, you can work hard and make something happen."

=== Olympic disappointment ===
Her first international competition was at the 2004 World Championships in Les Gets, France where she finished 46th. Prior to competing at the 2008 Summer Olympics, Pendrel competed at the 2007 Pan Am Games where she won gold. She finished 4th at the 2008 Beijing Olympics in the cross-country event just 9 seconds out of a medal position. Pendrel was not as notable a rider at the time as her hero, teammate, and gold medal favourite Marie-Hélène Prémont who did not finish after a lingering and unknown illness caused her to retire from the race.

This near Olympic success helped launch Pendrel's most successful period. She won the 2010 UCI World Cup Series before winning the 2011 World Championships. These achievements put her as one of Canada's top medal favourites for the 2012 Summer Olympics. In advance of the London games, she had won an online fan poll to be selected as Canada's flag bearer, though the Canadian Olympic Committee eventually selected Simon Whitfield as the flag bearer. In response she tweeted "Thank you Canada & cycling fans for voting me as people's choice for flag bearer. You honor and inspire me!" She was also put into a favoured position to win at the London Olympics by winning the test event prior to the games. At the Olympics Pendrel finished back in 9th place, disappointing the high expectations of her. After the race a tearful Pendrel said that "I felt so strong yesterday and today just didn't happen. You know I'm sorry because I know everyone in B.C. got up at 4:30 [a.m.] to watch me. It's just what I had in the day and unfortunately this only comes every four years. Maybe in Rio."

=== Commonwealth and Pan Am success ===
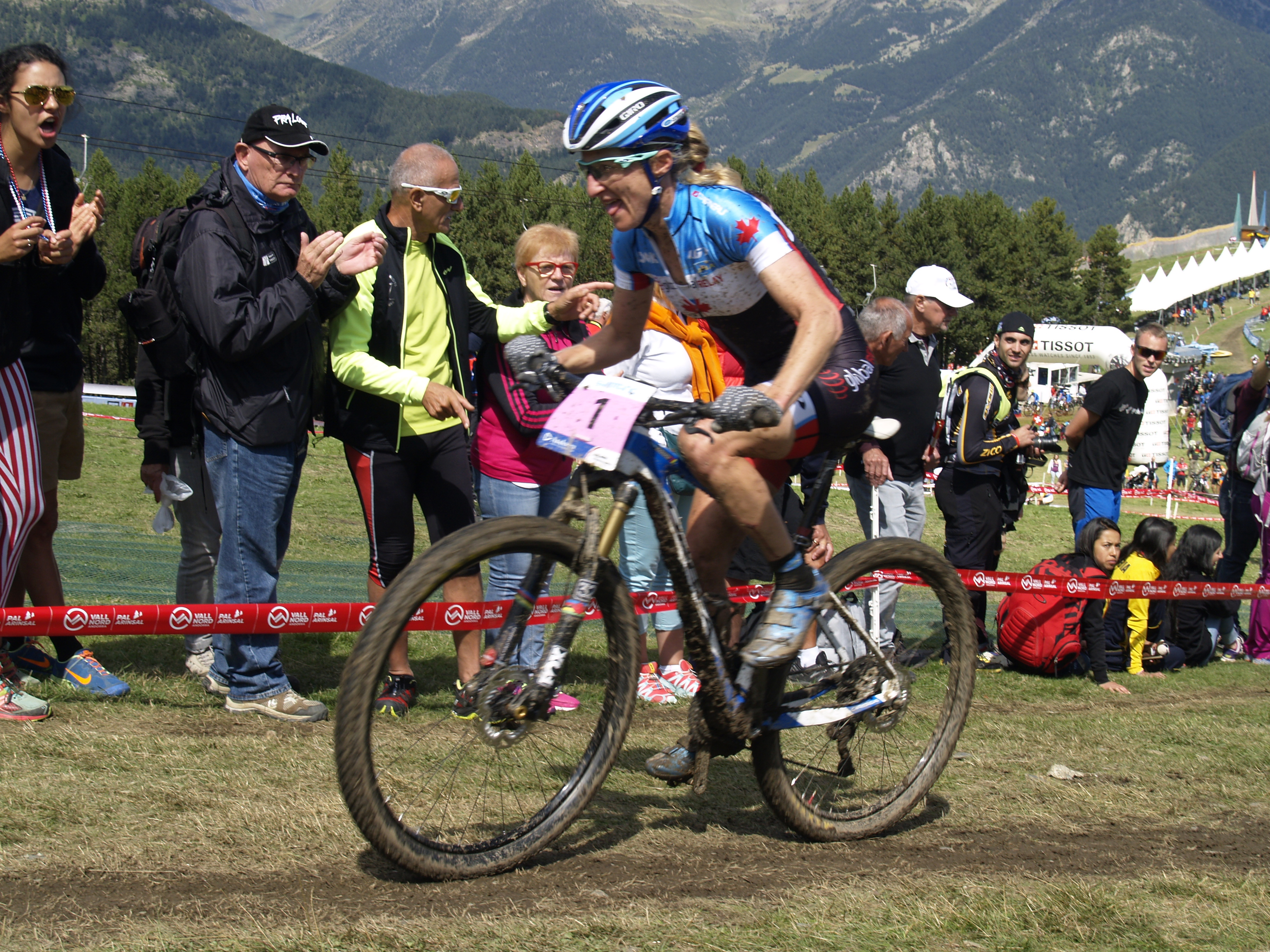
Pendrel at the 2015 UCI Mountain Bike & Trials World Championships.

Pendrel followed up Olympic disappointment with a great result in her next major multi-sport event the 2014 Commonwealth Games in Glasgow. There she won the gold medal in the women's mountain bike event while teammate Emily Batty followed her for a Canadian one-two finish on the podium. She then took her second World Championship title that September in Hafjell, Norway.

At the 2015 Pan American Games in Toronto Pendrel and Batty again battled for the top podium spot with the two Canadians taking an early lead on the same course they had raced in 2014 Nationals competition. This time it was Silver for Pendrel and gold for Emily Batty.

=== 2016 Olympic success at last ===
Pendrel met cycling Canada's automatic selection Criteria to represent Canada at the Olympic Games in Rio de Janeiro in 2016, and she did participate as part of Canada's Olympic team. At the mountain bike event she crashed early on one of the first turns but would battle back into the main chase pack, together with Emily Batty and would later pull away in the third position, holding it for the bronze medal over Batty. After Pendrel described the race saying "It's unbelievable. Before the race I would have been happy with my career if I didn't have an Olympic medal, but I'm sure happy that I do. At the beginning of the race with getting in a crash at the start and then my shifting stopped working and it was just like: 'Everything is going wrong. I'm used to having bad starts, luckily, and I know I can work through a field. We had prepared for every scenario. I knew that I could close a gap and that's what I set about doing today." Two weeks after the Games she won her third overall World Cup title.

=== 2020 Olympics ===
In July 2021, Pendrel was named to Canada's 2020 Olympic team, just seven months after giving birth.

== Honours ==
In 2012 Pendrel was awarded the Queen Elizabeth II Diamond Jubilee Medal.

== Personal ==
She was born in Fredericton, New Brunswick, and grew up outside the small community of Harvey Station, New Brunswick. Listed as her personal heroes are Gunn-Rita Dahle and Marie-Hélène Prémont.
