= Gunn-Rita Dahle Flesjå =

Norwegian cyclist (born 1973)

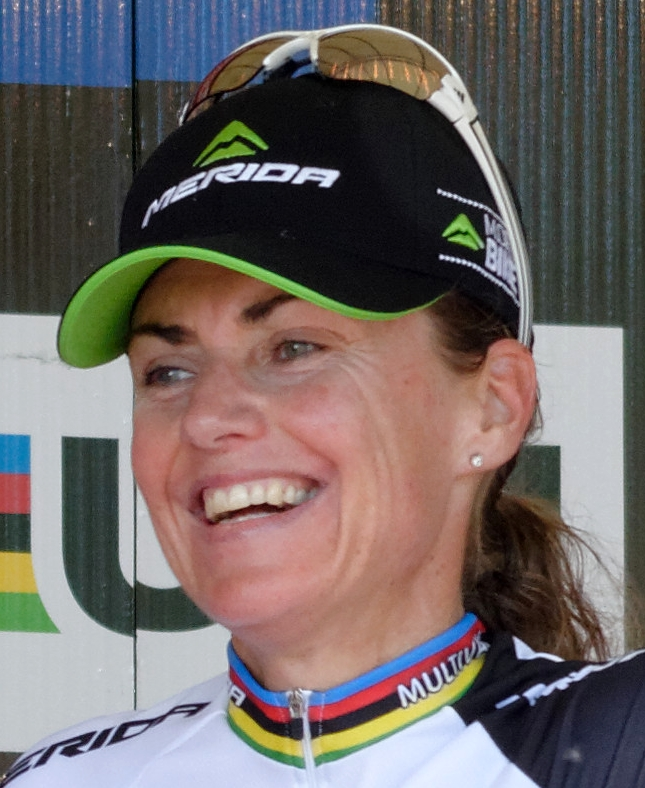
- Dahle Flesjå in 2016

Personal information
- Full name: Gunn-Rita Dahle Flesjå
- Nicknames: Cat Woman, The Iron Woman, Mountain-bike Queen
- Born: 10 February 1973 (age 53) Stavanger, Norway
- Height: 173 cm (5 ft 8 in)
- Weight: 62 kg (137 lb)

Cycling career
- Sport: Cycling
- Discipline: Mountain bike
- Role: Rider
Medal record
Women's Mountain bike racing
Representing Norway
Olympic Games
Gold medal – first place	2004 Athens	Women's cross-country

Gunn-Rita Dahle Flesjå (born 10 February 1973) is a Norwegian cross-country and marathon mountain biker. She won the women's cross-country gold medal at the 2004 Olympic Games and is a multiple World Champion. She has won six World Championships and six European championships. Dahle has also won four UCI World Cup XC in a row. She was on the start list of 2018 Cross Country European Championships.

== Biography ==
Gunn-Rita grew up in the village of Bjørheimsbygd in Strand Municipality, Rogaland. She had her first MTB ride in April 1995 at 22 years old. Gunn-Rita has won a total of 18 Olympic, World- and European Championship Gold Medals. She currently rides for the German-based MTB Team, Multivan Mérida Biking Team. She has been riding on Mérida bikes since January 2002 and has been a professional cyclist for 20 years. She has won the overall World Cup 4 consecutive years (2003–06) and has a total of 30 World Cup wins, beating Juliana Furtado's seemingly unbeatable record set in the 90s. Some of her greatest achievements are the Olympic gold medal in 2004 in Athens, 9 World Championship Gold medals, 8 European Championship Gold medals, and many silver medals. The last rainbow jersey she won in 2013, Worlds Marathon in Kirchberg (AUS).

== Personal information ==
Coach	Kenneth Flesjå
Education	Journalism, University of Stavanger, 1994–96
Civil status	married to Kenneth Flesjå. One son together (born March 2009)
Official website	www.gunnrita.com

== Team information ==
Current team: Multivan Mérida Biking Team Discipline: Mountain Bike, Cross-Country Olympic Distance Professional teams: American Eagle (Netherlands) 1995–1998, Øgland-DBS (Norway) 1998–2001, Multivan Mérida Biking Team (Germany/Taiwan), 2002–2016

== Major wins ==
Olympic gold medal: Athens, Greece (2004)

World Champion XCO Gold Medals: Rotorua, New Zealand (2006), Livigno, Italy (2005), Les Gets, France (2004), Kaprun, Austria (2002).

World Champion Marathon Gold Medals: Selva Val Gardena, Italy (2015), Kirchberg, Austria (2013), Villabassa, Italy (2008), Oisans, France (2006), Lillehammer, Norway (2005), Bad Goisern, Austria (2004).

European Championship XCO Gold Medals: Moscow, Russia (2012), Dohnany, Slovakia (2011), Kluisbergen, Belgium (2005), Walbrzych Ksiaz, Poland (2004), Kaprun, Austria (2003), Zürich, Switzerland (2002)

European Championship Marathon Gold Medals: Tartu, Estonia (2009), Alpago, Italy (2006).

World Championship XCO Silver Medals: Leogang, Austria (2012), Mont-Sainte-Anne, Canada (1998).

World Championship Marathon Silver Medal: Ornans, France (2012)

European Championship XCO Silver Medals: Alpago, Italy (2006), Étalle, Belgium (1998).

European Championship XC Marathon Silver Medals: Montebelluna, Italy (2010), Kaprun, Austria (2003), Kaprun, Austria (2002).

European Championship XCO Bronze Medal: St. Wendel, Germany (2008).

Overall World Cup Winner: 2003, 2004, 2005, 2006.

Overall World Cup second place: 1996, 1999, 2012.

World Cup races 1st place: 1st place Vallnord, Andorra (2018), 1st place Lenzerheide, Switzerland (2015), 1st place Val-d'Isère, France (2012), 1st place La Bresse, France (2012), 1st place Madrid, Spain (2008), 1st place Curaçao, Venezuela (2006), 1st place Spa, Belgium (2006), 1st place Fort William, Scotland (2006), 1st place Madrid, Spain (2006), 1st place Willingen, Germany (2005), 1st place Madrid, Spain (2005), 1st place Santa Catarina, Brazil (2005), 1st place New Mexico, USA (2005), 1st place Houffalize, Belgium (2005), 1st place Livigno, Italy (2004), 1st place Calgary, Canada (2004), 1st place Mont-Sainte-Anne, Canada (2004), 1st place Fort William, Scotland (2004), 1st place Houffalize, Belgium (2004), 1st place Madrid, Spain (2004), 1st place Grouse Mountain, Canada (2003), 1st place Mont-Sainte-Anne, Canada (2003), 1st place Fort William, Scotland (2003), 1st place St. Wendel, Germany (2003), 1st place Kaprun, Austria (2003), 1st place Canmore, Canada (1999), 1st place Bromont, Canada (1998), 1st place St. Wendel, Germany (1998), 1st place Kristiansand, Norway (1996), 1st place Hawaii, USA (1996).

== Awards ==
2007: Norwegian Sports Gala ceremony: award for Female Athlete of the Year ("Årets kvinnelige idrettsutøver"). 2005: Nominated for Laureus World Sports Awards, "Alternative Sportsperson of the Year" category. 2005: "Aftenpostens gullmedalje", one of the most coveted awards within Norwegian sports since 1933. 2005: Norwegian Sports Gala ceremony: the Title for Endurance ("Utholdenhetsprisen"), Name of the Year ("Årets navn"), and The Athletes' Own Award ("Utøvernes egen pris"). 2004: Norwegian Sports Gala ceremony: the Title for Endurance ("Utholdenhetsprisen"), Name of the Year ("Årets navn"), and The Athletes' Own Award ("Utøvernes egen pris"). 2003: Tabuprisen (The Taboo Award), a Norwegian award for high-profile individuals, awarded for openness concerning psychological issues.

== Professional career in detail ==
1995: Gunn-Rita Dahle Flesjå entered the world mountain bike racing scene summer 1995 after having her first off-road training ever in April the same year. She got a 3rd place in her first World Cup race in Plymouth (GBR), and signed up with American Eagle, a Dutch bicycle team and manufacturer, in October -95.

1996: In 1996 Gunn-Rita ended number 2 overall in the World Cup, winning her first WC race in Kristiansand, Norway, this season, as well as the World Cup Final in Haiway. She was also Nordic Champion in Finland this year. At the Atlanta Olympics she got 4th place. This all placed her firmly in the searchlight of the Norwegian media. 1996 was the first year that Mountain Biking was an Olympic discipline.

1997: The season of 1997 was unfortunately ruined by a virus. She was more or less not racing this summer, but finished of the season at the World Championship with a 12th place (må sjekke dette da jet er litt usikker- mulig en 14 plass!!!)

1998: In 1998 Gunn-Rita won a Grundig World Cup 1st place in Germany, and a Grundig World Cup 1st place in Canada. She also won the silver medal in the XCO (Cross-country Olympic distance) World Championships in Canada, and the silver medal in the XCO European championships in the Netherlands. She got 4th place overall in the World Cup series, which consisted of 12-14 races during the season these years, with 10 of them counting on the total WC score. Gunn-Rita signed a contract with Øgland/DBS, a small Norwegian bicycle manufacturer which used to be located in Sandnes, Norway, where Gunn-Rita lives. DBS used to be one of the big brands on the Nordic market and were the main sponsors for the Norwegian national cycling teams. Gunn-Rita also won one of the stages in the Tour de France Féminin road this year, and came in number 8 in a sprint at the women's Road Racing World Championships in Falkenburg, Belgium.

1999: The autumn of 1999 was a fantastic season for Gunn-Rita. She won 1st place in the World Cup race in Canmore, Canada, and ended 2nd overall in the World Cup. Gunn-Rita was among the top 5 in every single World Cup race this year, and she was missing a mere 5 points to win the World Cup overall, which was won my Allison Sydor. Gunn-Rita's efforts contributed enormously to qualifying the Norwegian Road National Team for the Sydney Olympics in 2000. In the autumn, she had an altitude simulation room built in the basement of her home, simulating 2500–3000 meters above sea level. She now embarked on a period of extremely hard training. A whole range of different experts and coaches made their entry onto the scene, leading to what can only be described as an unfortunate degree of confusion. As autumn progressed, Gunn-Rita grew increasingly fatigued. As the preparations for the Olympic season started up (Sydney 2000), she was pressed into a training regime that was simply too extreme. Combined with her fatigue after the taxing season between road and MTB racing of 1999, it became too much.

2000: The season of 2000 was an extremely tough one for Gunn-Rita as she struggled with the effects of overtraining. She ended in the top ten of the first WC race of the season in Mexico, but had to quit the second WC race as her legs simply weren't up to it. She became very ill after this. She made a huge effort to make it in time for the Sydney Olympics, but without luck. She was quite simply overtrained, which also ruined her winter training for 2000–01. She tried a range of different treatments to remedy the situation, and visited many experts to try to document what had happened. From being a contender for the Olympic gold medal, she went to a complete lack of energy, just sitting on the couch. The experience was very tough on her, mentally. DBS was experiencing financial problems at this time and was cutting down on positions, and this was difficult for Gunn-Rita too, because a lot of the DBS cycling team was built up around her. Many wondered what had become of Gunn-Rita, and wherever she went, people would ask her what was going on. At this point in time, Gunn-Rita was dropped as an athlete. Everyone gave up on her, and it took a long time before her muscles started to work properly again.

2001: In the spring of 2001, Kenneth Flesjå took over has Gunn-Rita's coach and trainer. He helped her to start right from scratch and slowly build things up again. His goal was first of all to have Gunn-Rita back on her bike smiling again. Kenneth had to re-plan everything based on the way Gunn-Rita's body responded to the pressures. At the World Championship race in Vail in 2001, Gunn-Rita was leading by 45 seconds right until a short distance before the finish, but her tire was split open just before the finish, ruining her chances of the title. Without any results for almost 2 seasons, it was difficult to get a new contract for Gunn-Rita. In the end she signed a small, one-year contract with a small German team called Mérida International. There wasn't a lot of money in it at the time, but they gave her good bonus deals. Sabine Spitz and Irina Kalientieva were also signed up with the Mérida team at this time. It was a small team, but it provided Gunn-Rita with the chance she needed. Kenneth and Gunn-Rita knew that they could win more. Gunn-Rita was still under the effects of the overtraining and was still weak, so they had to continue holding back for a period.

2002: In 2002 Gunn-Rita won the gold medal in the European XCO Cross Country Championships (Olympic distance) at Zürich. One month later she became the World Champion XC for the first time (Kaprun, Austria). 2002 introduced the period in Gunn-Rita's career with the most wins. Even so, in 2002 Kenneth and Gunn-Rita had discussed seriously whether to cut out cycling and do something completely different – the life of a professional cyclist being as demanding as it is. However, they both had faith in Mérida, and they had friends who had faith in them, but it took a lot of guts. They even had to borrow money from Gunn-Rita's father to keep going. But the amazing results this year proved to them that her strength was on the return, and through the coming years she totally dominated the sport. With this spectacular return after her unfortunate absence, several teams showed interest in signing Gunn-Rita up, but she decided to remain loyal to Mérida. At the start of 2002, Team Mérida had been the only team willing to sponsor her without pressurizing her, demonstrating a high level of faith in her abilities. And so, Gunn-Rita signed a new 3-year contract with Team Mérida.

2003: 2003 was the first year Gunn-Rita was the overall winner of the World Cup with 1st place at the WC races in Austria, Scotland, Canada twice, and Germany. She won many other international races also this year. She continued to win the overall World Cup every year from 2003 to 2006. It had taken three years since the tough season of 2000 to return to the top, but now her musculature was capable of handling enormous strains. Her winter training through the following years was extremely effective. In 2003, Gunn-Rita received Tabuprisen (the "Taboo Award"). This is a Norwegian award given to high-profile individuals who are open about various psychological issues. She received the award for having been open and honest about the tough period she had been through. Admitting to weakness or problems is very much a taboo area for athletes. Gunn-Rita had several nicknames, such as the Iron Woman (Jernkvinnen) for many years, but was open about having met the wall in 2000. The Norwegian Prime Minister, Kjell Magne Bondevik, has also received this prize, in 1999.

2004: In 2004 Gunn-Rita won everything. She won the World Cup overall title with first places in the WC in Spain, Belgium, Scotland, Canada twice, and Italy. She became Olympic Champion (Gold medal) in Athens, Greece. She won the World Championship Gold medal XCO (Olympic distance) in France. She won the World Championship XCM Marathon distance gold medal in Austria. Moreover, she won Gold in the European Championship XC (cross country) Olympic distance in Poland. In other words, she took four titles this year and won two World Championship jerseys, in addition to winning many other races. Through the 2004 season she gave the mountain biking sport enormous publicity in Norway. She won three awards at the annual Norwegian Sports Gala ceremony: the Title for Endurance ("Utholdenhetsprisen"), Name of the Year ("Årets navn"), and The Athletes' Own Award ("Utøvernes egen pris"). The season of 2004 was extremely busy for Gunn-Rita and Kenneth due to a lot of promotional work for various sponsors, in Japan and Taiwan and other places.

2005: In 2005 Gunn-Rita was the overall winner of the World Cup, with 1st places in Belgium, USA, Brazil, Spain and Germany. By the end of 2005 she had won 11 WC races in a row, i.e. she had gone unbeaten for two whole seasons. She won the gold medal at the World Championship XCO (Olympic distance) in Italy. She won the gold medal at the World Championships Marathon distance in Lillehammer, Norway ("Birkebeinerrittet"). She also won the gold medal at the European World Championship XCO (Olympic distance) in Belgium, thus defending her European Championship title for the third year running. Her goal for the season of 2005 had been to defend the titles from 2004, something she managed with style. It meant especially much to her to win the World Championship XC race in Lillehammer, Norway. But this was a particularly taxing season because the seasons of 2004 and 2005 overlapped each other, and her many victories from the year before laid a lot of pressure on her shoulders. In Norway Gunn-Rita received the "Aftenpostens gullmedalje" gold medal award, one of the most coveted awards within Norwegian sports since 1933. She also received three prizes at this year's Sports Gala: "Utøverprisen", a prize voted by all of Norway's top professional athletes – a prize that really meant a lot to her – and the title for Endurance ("Utholdenhetsprisen") once again, and she was voted by the television viewers of the Sports Gala as Name of the Year ("Årets navn"). Gunn-Rita was also nominated for the Laureus World Sports Awards, in the category of "Alternative Sportsperson of the Year" in 2005. In 2005 Gunn-Rita married her coach and trainer Kenneth Flesjå, in Stavanger, Norway. She signed a new 3-year contract with Mérida which doubled her wage, but put an upper limit on her bonus money for wins.

2006: In 2006 Gunn-Rita was the overall winner of the World Cup, with 1st place in Spain, Scotland, Belgium and Venezuela. She won the World Championship XCO (Olympic distance) Gold medal in New Zealand. She also won the World Championship Marathon distance gold medal in France. She won the European Championship Marathon distance gold medal in Italy, and the European Championship XC Olympic distance silver medal in Italy. This was the first time she had won the European Championship XC Marathon distance, after two silver medals. She is the only mountain bike cyclist who has won all the gold medals. The goal for 2006 was to defend all the titles from 2005. Athletically speaking, this was one of the very best seasons ever. At her height, she won a World Cup race by four and a half minutes. A margin of this magnitude should not be possible. In the World Cup race at Fort William, Scotland, she punctured and had to run all the way to the technical zone to get a new wheel, and even so finished number 4, only a few seconds behind the winner. She was riding unbelievably fast during this period. Gunn-Rita performed much promotional work for sponsors this year, in Beijing, Estonia, Norway, etc., and took part in very many races in different time zones. For example, she won a races in Brazil and New Mexico, then took part in the European Championships XC Marathon in Italy, then the World Championships XC Marathon in France, then travelled to New Zealand and won the World Championship there, and then went back to Europe to the last World Cup race, where she ended number 2. This incredibly high level of activity led to another down-period in the season in 2007.

2007: In 2007 the effect of the high tempo of 2006 made itself evident. Despite many victories, the season was affected by a viral attack on her stomach and digestive system. Even so, the main reason for the fatigue was simply her body's need for a break. Despite these factors, she often this year, too. She won many Bundesliga races, and she won the Gunn-Rita Marathon in Monte Belluna. At the second World Cup race of the year, in Offenburg, she started to notice stomach problems and her energy levels descended. She fought her way to a third place. But she desperately needed restitution, and more or less terminated racing activities for the rest of the season. She travelled home, took many tests, and the conclusion was this virus in her digestive system. But really she was suffering the effects of having pressed her body so hard for so long. Her body simply needed a break. All athletes meet the wall once in a while, and in 2007 it happened for Gunn-Rita.

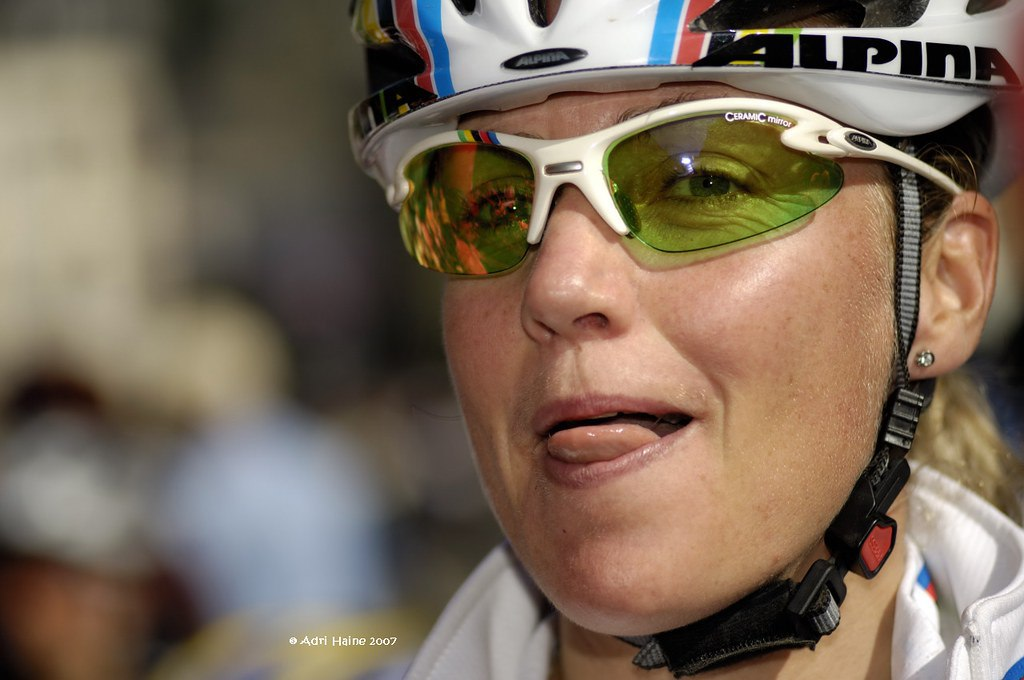
Gunn-Rita Dahle at the start of the 2007 World Cup in Houffalize, Belgium

In 2007 Gunn-Rita placed second in the first World Cup race, and third in the second World Cup race, and she won some Italian Cup and Bundesliga races. She tried to race more, but there was simply no more energy to be had. This was a somewhat special situation, because she was the reigning World Champion and had been dominating the sport. Suddenly disappearing like this caused various theories and rumours to abound. Still, not wanting to end up where she had been in 2000, she decided to terminate the season and focus all her attention on preparations for the season of 2008. It was simply a tough year all round. In 2007 Gunn-Rita received the Norwegian Sports Gala award for "Female Athlete of the Year". Thus, she has received seven prizes from the Sports Gala. Very few athletes have received that many prizes from the Sports Gala. This was the last prize she received from the Sports Gala.

2008: Gunn-Rita won the World Championship Marathon distance gold medal in Italy in 2008. She won the European Championship XCO (Olympic distance) Bronze Medal in Germany, and she got 1st place in the World Cup race in Spain. They didn't achieve as much this year, since the season of 2007 had been ruined. Gunn-Rita was under the influence of the virus and fatigue throughout the winter and spring. She received a lot of help from experts to prepare form tops for big venues, and this led to less restitution.

The race season of 2008 was a partial comeback. Her first place in the World Cup race caused many to think that she was back on top again, but Kenneth and Gunn-Rita knew better. Gunn-Rita was struggling with injuries to her hip from a crash when racing in Houffalize, Belgium. Since the contract with Mérida was coming to an end, they decided to put all their energy into winning the World Championship Marathon. With almost a year without top level training and preparation, Kenneth and Gunn-Rita knew that top shape through the entire season would not be possible.

Gunn-Rita had to quit the race at the Olympics in Beijing due to a crash, in which she cracked her brake handle. However, she was feeling queasy due to the pregnancy, and prior to the race she had been involved in a crash and cracked a rib. She received a central anaesthetic right before the race. Her failure to win the race led to a storm of criticism back in Norway, from the media and various organizations. Gunn-Rita and Kenneth experienced very strongly that Norway turned its back on them, and they really learned whose support they could count on, and whose they could not.

2009: In 2009 Gunn-Rita won the European Championship XC Marathon distance gold medal in Estonia. Gunn-Rita and Kenneth got their first child, Bjørnar, in March this year. Gunn-Rita was keen to continue within the world of cycling, but perhaps mainly as an ambassador, as neither of them knew what it would be like to combine having a child with racing. However, only one week after the birth, they realized that racing was still an option. Therefore, Gunn-Rita went to Estonia six months after the birth to take part in the European Championships, a race track she knew well from before, and won the gold medal. She also won the Gunn-Rita Marathon in Italy, which was the Italian national championship, only three months after the birth. And she won Birkebeinerrittet in Norway.

It was a bit of a transition for the couple becoming parents. During the autumn of 2009 Gunn-Rita lost all her ranking points in the World Cup because of not having taken part, and thus she lost her good starting position in the races. The actual sport was undergoing changes during this period as well, with race time reduced by 45 minutes and shorter race tracks, in addition to more technically demanding elements in the races.

2010: In 2010 Gunn-Rita took the silver medal in the European Championship XC Marathon distance in Italy. She started racing in the World Cup again, beginning in Darby Forest in the UK, but had naturally fallen to a ranking of number 150 due to not taking part for a year. So she had to start at the very back. Her aim was primarily to use the first part of the season as a part of her training. She was troubled by a lot of sickness during the winter preceding the race season, and Kenneth got mononucleosis. The European Championships this year was the Gunn-Rita Marathon in Italy, an extremely demanding race track, and her foundation wasn't the best. Even so, she got the silver medal. She placed tenth in the European Championships XCO in Israel. She took part in the World Championships in Canada and took part in many World Cup races during the season in order to get points for her World Cup ranking. She worked her way up from number 150 to number 19 of the World Cup ranking in 2010. Many had given up on her this year. She was stamped as "too old", and was constantly bombarded by signals that she should give up her cycling career. The atmosphere amongst the riders within the Mérida team turned harshly against her, headed by two of the male riders. It was a tough year for Kenneth and Gunn-Rita.

2011: In 2011 Gunn-Rita won the gold medal in the European Championship XC Olympic distance in Slovakia. However, due to many bouts of sickness, the foundation training during the winter preceding the cycling season was more or less totally lost. This was the year they started sending Bjørnar, their son, to a nursery, and as a result, they were bombarded by viruses and bacteria. The whole family was extremely ill for three months, and Gunn-Rita was unable to do any training of value. This meant they had to use the first part of the season to generate a fitness level good enough to reach their goals. They aimed for a fitness peak during the World Championship marathon, but Gunn-Rita got sick again. However, she won the Italian cup in the spring and continued her ascent up the rankings in the World Cup.

Then she won the European Championship XC in Slovakia, a race she completely dominated. She rode alone for the whole race. This was an enormous comeback for her. Her last European Championship victory was in 2005 in Belgium, six years earlier. This was also her first victory after becoming a mother. She placed sixth in the World Cup, thanks to the winter of sickness.

2012: In 2012 Gunn-Rita was ranked number 2 in the World Cup overall. She won two WC races. She won the gold medal in the European Championship XC Olympic distance in Moscow. She got the silver medal in the World Championships XC Olympic distance in Austria. And she got the silver medal in the World Championships Marathon distance in France. This winter, the couple took Bjørnar, their son, out of the nursery, and had a good winter of training. They had their fair share of illness this winter too, but the foundation was there even so. The national Norwegian athletic organization Olympiatoppen was not interested in supporting Gunn-Rita whatsoever. Nobody believed that she would have a comeback. She won her last World Cup race two weeks before the Olympics in London. She dominated the race by two minutes. Then came the Olympics. Up the hill she had been number 7 or 8, then on the first descent she chose the B-line and her speed was too low, so she overbalanced and crashed, taking a very hard hit to the hip. She didn't want to show that this had happened, but she had lost sensation down her whole side, and lost the rhythm. Then she punctured and was forced to quit the race. The attitude from Norway was negative in the extreme, along the lines of "If you're racing for the nation in the Olympics, you do not quit the race," but the puncture happened a great distance from the technical assistance area, and there was no point continuing. This was a huge downer for Gunn-Rita. She was in extremely good shape for the race. But she didn't let this experience stop her. She mobilized her strength and got Silver in the World Championship XCO. These were her first XCO World Championship medals since 2006, 6 years earlier. After this both she and Kenneth were reasonably deflated and got ill. However, she gathered her strength once more for the World Championship Marathon race, despite great fatigue. Once again, the whole of Team Mérida got food poisoning, so her Silver Medal was a bitter experience. This year she did a lot of promotional work for Mérida in Korea and Japan. She got a new contract – she still wanted to continue cycling. It had in many ways become a lifestyle, and she was managing to combine racing with being a mother. Her chosen lifestyle actually permits more time with her son and family than a normal 9-to-5 job would. She very often has her parents along when she travels, to look after Bjørnar when she's out training or racing. In the Norwegian media, however, her season was summed up with her bad luck in the Olympics. This felt very unfair to her when she got the World Championship Silver after the Olympics, and had turned her bad luck into victory. Where other Norwegian athletes experienced a bad 2012 Olympics and stated that they were quitting sports careers, Gunn-Rita took the negative media like an adult.

2013: In 2013 Gunn-Rita won the World Championship Marathon Gold medal, in Kirchberg, Austria. She had to do a lot of promotional work for Mérida, causing her to fall somewhat behind in her winter training regime. She turned her full focus on the World Championship and didn't take part in the European Championship XC race in Bern in order to be totally ready for the World Championships. In the World Cup she finished among the top five, three times, but didn't have the foundation necessary. However, she and Kenneth timed her fitness peak perfectly for the World Championship, and putting on the Rainbow Jersey once again was wonderful for her. At the World Cup at Hafjell, Norway, this year, she had pneumonia, but her physical condition was so excellent that she ended number 5 even so.

2014: Gunn-Rita was able to achieve an excellent fitness foundation during the winter preceding the season of 2014. She showed excellent shape and performance in the first WC race in Pietermaritzburg (SA) in April, finishing second, only a few seconds behind the winner, Jolanda Neff.

Gunn-Rita won many international races and scored top three in all WC races she participated in during the season 2014. She was one of the favorites for the European Championship in St. Wendel, but became sick the week before. She was also considered one of the favourites at the end of season World Championship XCO at Hafjell, Norway, but experienced one of these terrible days on the bike and only managed a top-ten place.

Gunn-Rita was among the cyclists most active in promoting the sport in Asia during the 2000s and 2010s. In 2014, she spent five days in China in September, followed by a ten-day visit to Taiwan in November.

In 2015, Gunn-Rita signed a two-year contract with Multivan Merida, extending her career through the 2016 Summer Olympics in Rio de Janeiro. She continued to be coached by her husband, Kenneth Flesjå. This agreement allowed Dahle Flesjå to maintain her participation in international mountain bike racing for an additional two seasons.

== Achievements ==
Year	Result	Event
2001	1st	Norwegian National Cross Country Cycling Champion
2001	1st	Nordic Championship in cross country
2002	Gold	UCI Mountain Bike World Championships in cross country
2002	Gold	European Mountain Bike Championship in cross country
2002	Silver	European Mountain Bike Championship in marathon
2003	1st overall	UCI Mountain Bike World Cup in cross country
2003	Gold	European Mountain Bike Championship in cross country
2003	Silver	European Mountain Bike Championship in marathon
2003	1st	Nordic Championship in cross country
2004	1st overall	UCI Mountain Bike World Cup in cross country
2004	Gold	Olympic Games in cross country
2004	Gold	UCI Mountain Bike World Championships in cross country
2004	Gold	UCI Mountain Bike World Championships in marathon
2004	Gold	European Mountain Bike Championship in cross country
2004	1st	Norwegian National Cross Country Cycling Champion
2004	1st	Nordic Championship in cross country
2005	1st overall	UCI Mountain Bike World Cup in cross country
2005	Gold	UCI Mountain Bike World Championships in cross country
2005	Gold	UCI Mountain Bike World Championships in marathon
2005	Gold	European Mountain Bike Championship in cross country
2005	1st	Norwegian National Cross Country Cycling Champion
2005	1st	Nordic Championship in cross country
2006	1st overall	UCI Mountain Bike World Cup in cross country
2006	Gold	UCI Mountain Bike World Championships in cross country
2006	Gold	UCI Mountain Bike World Championships in marathon
2006	Gold	European Mountain Bike Championship in cross country
2006	Gold	European Mountain Bike Championship in marathon
2008	Gold	UCI Mountain Bike World Championships in marathon
2009	Gold	European Mountain Bike Championship in marathon
2013	Gold	UCI Mountain Bike Championship in marathon
2015	Gold	UCI Mountain Bike Championship in marathon
