= Val di Sole =

Valley in Italy

Coordinates: 46.3°N 10.8°E

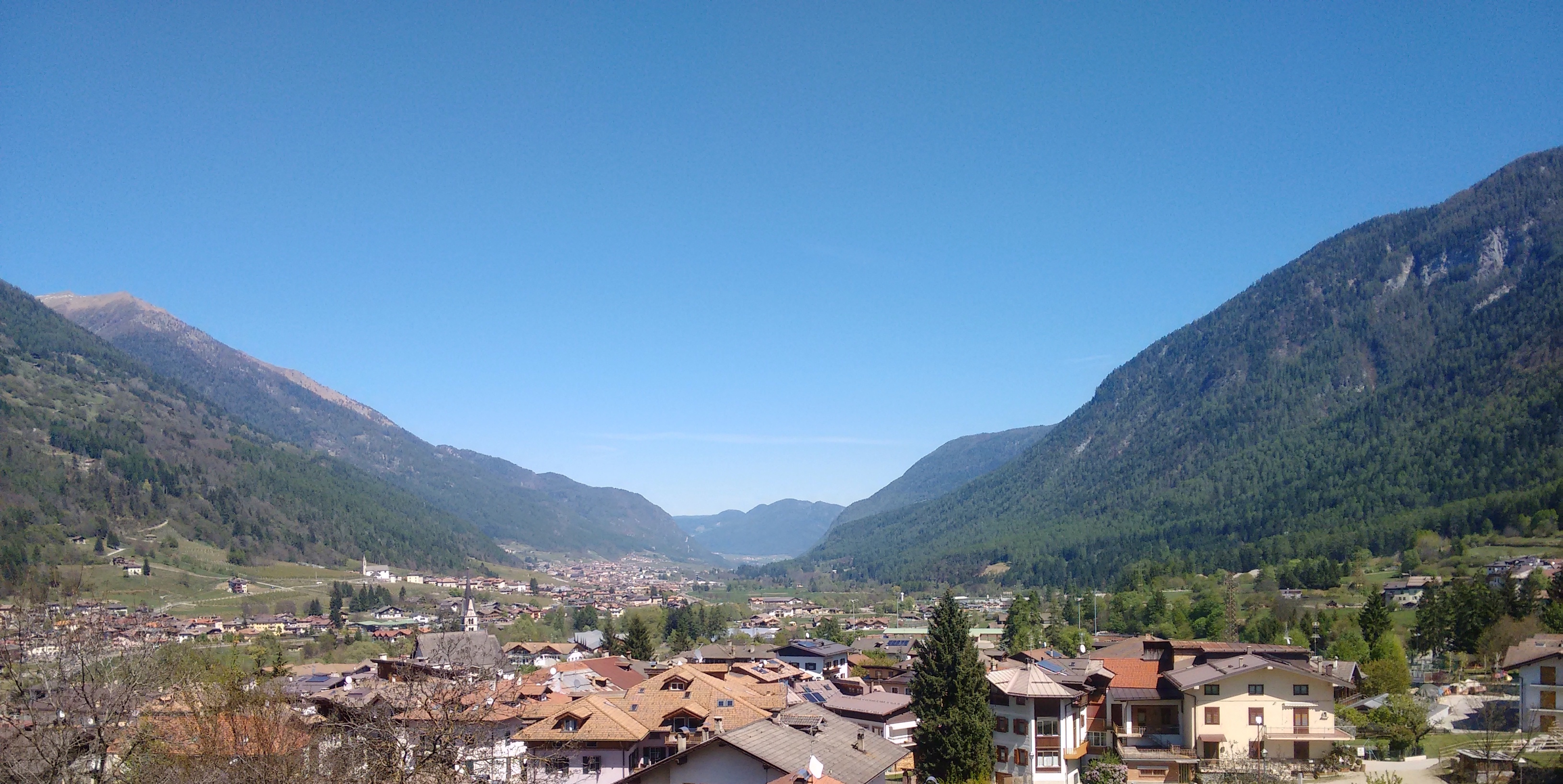
The town of Dimaro in the Sole Valley

The Sole Valley (Ladin: Val de Sól, Italian: Val di Sole or Valle di Sole, German: Sulztal) is a valley in Trentino, northern Italy.

Sole Valley applies to the Vermiglio Valley, the east-west aligned valley of the river Noce and its sidevalleys, among which the Peio Valley that heads to the Ortler. The rest of the valley from Ossana to Mostizzolo is simply called Sole Valley.

Some of the towns in the valley are Vermiglio, Peio, Dimaro, Croviana and Malè (the main town).

The Sole Valley heads to the Tonale Pass, on the other side of the pass (and in the same direction as the Vermiglio Valley) begins the valley of the river Oglio which flows to Edolo. In the northwest the region is bordered by the Ortler group with the Stelvio national park, in the southwest by the Adamello group with the nature reserve Parco Naturale Adamello Brenta. In the southern part of the region is the ski resort Madonna di Campiglio, just over the Campo Carlo Magno, a pass that leads to the Rendena Valley.

In the east the region ends at Mostizzolo, where the main valley bends south to Non Valley before joining the valley of the Adige north of Trento.

== See also ==
- Malghetto Lakes
