= 2009 UCI Mountain Bike World Cup =

Series of races for all-terrain bicyclists

- Date: April–September 2009

The 2009 UCI Mountain Bike World Cup included three disciplines: cross-country, downhill and four-cross. It was sponsored by Nissan.

== Cross-country ==
Date	Venue	Podium (Men)	Podium (Women)
11 April 2009	(South Africa) Pietermaritzburg	José Antonio Hermida (ESP)	Elisabeth Osl (AUT)
11 April 2009	(South Africa) Pietermaritzburg	Julien Absalon (FRA)	Irina Kalentieva (RUS)
11 April 2009	(South Africa) Pietermaritzburg	Burry Stander (RSA)	Lene Byberg (NOR)
26 April 2009	(Germany) Offenburg	Julien Absalon (FRA)	Chengyuan Ren (CHN)
26 April 2009	(Germany) Offenburg	Wolfram Kurschat (GER)	Margarita Fullana (ESP)
26 April 2009	(Germany) Offenburg	Jean-Christophe Péraud (FRA)	Lene Byberg (NOR)
3 May 2009	(Belgium) Houffalize	Julien Absalon (FRA)	Margarita Fullana (ESP)
3 May 2009	(Belgium) Houffalize	Wolfram Kurschat (GER)	Catharine Pendrel (CAN)
3 May 2009	(Belgium) Houffalize	Ralph Näf (SUI)	Chengyuan Ren (CHN)
24 May 2009	(Spain) Madrid	Julien Absalon (FRA)	Margarita Fullana (ESP)
24 May 2009	(Spain) Madrid	Ralph Näf (SUI)	Marie-Hélène Prémont (CAN)
24 May 2009	(Spain) Madrid	Moritz Milatz (GER)	Lene Byberg (NOR)
26 July 2009	(Canada) Mont-Sainte-Anne	Julien Absalon (FRA)	Catharine Pendrel (CAN)
26 July 2009	(Canada) Mont-Sainte-Anne	José Antonio Hermida (ESP)	Irina Kalentieva (RUS)
26 July 2009	(Canada) Mont-Sainte-Anne	Geoff Kabush (CAN)	Kateřina Nash (CZE)
2 August 2009	(Canada) Bromont	Geoff Kabush (CAN)	Lene Byberg (NOR)
2 August 2009	(Canada) Bromont	José Antonio Hermida (ESP)	Irina Kalentieva (RUS)
2 August 2009	(Canada) Bromont	Ralph Näf (SUI)	Catharine Pendrel (CAN)
13 September 2009	(Switzerland) Champéry	Burry Stander (RSA)	Elisabeth Osl (AUT)
13 September 2009	(Switzerland) Champéry	Julien Absalon (FRA)	Anna Szafraniec (POL)
13 September 2009	(Switzerland) Champéry	Ralph Näf (SUI)	Lene Byberg (NOR)
19 September 2009	(Austria) Schladming	José Antonio Hermida (ESP)	Elisabeth Osl (AUT)
19 September 2009	(Austria) Schladming	Ruben Ruzafa Cueto (ESP)	Lene Byberg (NOR)
19 September 2009	(Austria) Schladming	Mathias Flückiger (SUI)	Catharine Pendrel (CAN)
		Podium (Men)	Podium (Women)
Final Standings	UCI World Cup; Cross Country Championship	Julien Absalon (FRA)	Elisabeth Osl (AUT)
Final Standings	UCI World Cup; Cross Country Championship	José Antonio Hermida (ESP)	Lene Byberg (NOR)
Final Standings	UCI World Cup; Cross Country Championship	Burry Stander (RSA)	Catharine Pendrel (CAN)

== Downhill ==
Date	Venue	Podium (Men)	Podium (Women)
11 April 2009	(South Africa) Pietermaritzburg	Greg Minnaar (RSA)	Tracey Mosely (GBR)
11 April 2009	(South Africa) Pietermaritzburg	Michael Hannah (AUS)	Emmeline Ragot (FRA)
11 April 2009	(South Africa) Pietermaritzburg	Steve Peat (GBR)	Sabrina Jonnier (FRA)
10 May 2009	(France) La Bresse	Steve Peat (GBR)	Sabrina Jonnier (FRA)
10 May 2009	(France) La Bresse	Sam Hill (AUS)	Tracey Mosely (GBR)
10 May 2009	(France) La Bresse	Michael Hannah (AUS)	Myriam Nicole (FRA)
17 May 2009	(Andorra) Vallnord	Steve Peat (GBR)	Sabrina Jonnier (FRA)
17 May 2009	(Andorra) Vallnord	Gee Atherton (GBR)	Emmeline Ragot (FRA)
17 May 2009	(Andorra) Vallnord	Greg Minnaar (RSA)	Tracey Mosely (GBR)
6 June 2009	(United Kingdom) Fort William	Greg Minnaar (RSA)	Sabrina Jonnier (FRA)
6 June 2009	(United Kingdom) Fort William	Sam Hill (AUS)	Emmeline Ragot (FRA)
6 June 2009	(United Kingdom) Fort William	Samuel Blenkinsop (NZL)	Céline Gros (FRA)
21 June 2009	(Slovenia) Maribor	Fabien Barel (FRA)	Sabrina Jonnier (FRA)
21 June 2009	(Slovenia) Maribor	Sam Hill (AUS)	Emmeline Ragot (FRA)
21 June 2009	(Slovenia) Maribor	Greg Minnaar (RSA)	Floriane Pugin (FRA)
26 July 2009	(Canada) Mont-Sainte-Anne	Sam Hill (AUS)	Sabrina Jonnier (FRA)
26 July 2009	(Canada) Mont-Sainte-Anne	Steve Peat (GBR)	Emmeline Ragot (FRA)
26 July 2009	(Canada) Mont-Sainte-Anne	Aaron Gwin (USA)	Tracey Mosely (GBR)
2 August 2009	(Canada) Bromont, Quebec	Greg Minnaar (RSA)	Sabrina Jonnier (FRA)
2 August 2009	(Canada) Bromont, Quebec	Fabien Barel (FRA)	Floriane Pugin (FRA)
2 August 2009	(Canada) Bromont, Quebec	Sam Hill (AUS)	Mio Suemasa (JPN)
19 September 2009	(Austria) Schladming	Sam Hill (AUS)	Tracey Mosely (GBR)
19 September 2009	(Austria) Schladming	Samuel Blenkinsop (NZL)	Floriane Pugin (FRA)
19 September 2009	(Austria) Schladming	Greg Minnaar (RSA)	Céline Gros (FRA)
		Podium (Men)	Podium (Women)
Final Standings	UCI World Cup; Downhill Championship	Sam Hill (AUS)	Sabrina Jonnier (FRA)
Final Standings	UCI World Cup; Downhill Championship	Greg Minnaar (RSA)	Tracey Mosely (GBR)
Final Standings	UCI World Cup; Downhill Championship	Steve Peat (GBR)	Emmeline Ragot (FRA)

== Four-Cross ==
Date	Venue	Podium (Men)	Podium (Women)
12 April 2009	(South Africa) Pietermaritzburg	Jared Graves (AUS)	Anneke Beerten (NED)
12 April 2009	(South Africa) Pietermaritzburg	Michal Prokop (CZE)	Fionn Griffiths (GBR)
12 April 2009	(South Africa) Pietermaritzburg	Rafael Alvarez De Lara Lucas (ESP)	Romana Labounková (CZE)
3 May 2009	(Belgium) Houffalize	Jared Graves (AUS)	Jill Kintner (USA)
3 May 2009	(Belgium) Houffalize	Dan Atherton (GBR)	Jana Horáková (CZE)
3 May 2009	(Belgium) Houffalize	Roger Rinderknecht (SUI)	Anneke Beerten (NED)
17 May 2009	(Andorra) Vallnord	Joost Wichman (NED)	Fionn Griffiths (GBR)
17 May 2009	(Andorra) Vallnord	Luke Madill (AUS)	Anneke Beerten (NED)
17 May 2009	(Andorra) Vallnord	Jared Graves (AUS)	Jana Horáková (CZE)
7 June 2009	(United Kingdom) Fort William	Jared Graves (AUS)	Jill Kintner (USA)
7 June 2009	(United Kingdom) Fort William	Romain Saladini (FRA)	Caroline Buchanan (AUS)
7 June 2009	(United Kingdom) Fort William	Lukas Mechura (CZE)	Fionn Griffiths (GBR)
20 June 2009	(Slovenia) Maribor	Joost Wichman (NED)	Caroline Buchanan (AUS)
20 June 2009	(Slovenia) Maribor	Jared Graves (AUS)	Melissa Buhl (USA)
20 June 2009	(Slovenia) Maribor	Roger Rinderknecht (SUI)	Anneke Beerten (NED)
26 July 2009	(Canada) Mont-Sainte-Anne	Jared Graves (AUS)	Anneke Beerten (NED)
26 July 2009	(Canada) Mont-Sainte-Anne	Rafael Alvarez De Lara Lucas (ESP)	Fionn Griffiths (GBR)
26 July 2009	(Canada) Mont-Sainte-Anne	Tomáš Slavík (CZE)	Joanna Petterson (RSA)
2 August 2009	(Canada) Bromont	Joost Wichman (NED)	Fionn Griffiths (GBR)
2 August 2009	(Canada) Bromont	Mitch Ropelato (USA)	Anneke Beerten (NED)
2 August 2009	(Canada) Bromont	Dan Atherton (GBR)	Jill Kintner (USA)
20 September 2009	(Austria) Schladming	Jared Graves (AUS)	Anneke Beerten (NED)
20 September 2009	(Austria) Schladming	Romain Saladini (FRA)	Anita Molcik (AUT)
20 September 2009	(Austria) Schladming	Johannes Fischbach (GER)	Katy Curd (GBR)
		Podium (Men)	Podium (Women)
Final Standings	UCI World Cup; Four-Cross Championship	Jared Graves (AUS)	Anneke Beerten (NED)
Final Standings	UCI World Cup; Four-Cross Championship	Joost Wichman (NED)	Fionn Griffiths (GBR)
Final Standings	UCI World Cup; Four-Cross Championship	Romain Saladini (FRA)	Jill Kintner (USA)

== See also ==
- 2009 UCI Mountain Bike & Trials World Championships
