= 2008 UCI Mountain Bike World Cup =

Season of the mountain bike world cup today

- Date: April–September 2008

The 2008 UCI Mountain Bike World Cup included four disciplines: cross-country, downhill, marathon and four-cross. It was sponsored by Nissan.

== Cross-country ==
Date	Venue	Podium (Men)	Podium (Women)
20 April 2008	(Belgium) Houffalize	Julien Absalon (FRA)	Chengyuan Ren (CHN)
20 April 2008	(Belgium) Houffalize	Nino Schurter (SUI)	Irina Kalentieva (RUS)
20 April 2008	(Belgium) Houffalize	Christoph Sauser (SUI)	Marie-Hélène Prémont (CAN)
27 April 2008	(Germany) Offenburg	Julien Absalon (FRA)	Irina Kalentieva (RUS)
27 April 2008	(Germany) Offenburg	Christoph Sauser (SUI)	Marie-Hélène Prémont (CAN)
27 April 2008	(Germany) Offenburg	Florian Vogel (SUI)	Chengyuan Ren (CHN)
4 May 2008	(Spain) Madrid	Julien Absalon (FRA)	Gunn-Rita Dahle (NOR)
4 May 2008	(Spain) Madrid	José Antonio Hermida (ESP)	Marie-Hélène Prémont (CAN)
4 May 2008	(Spain) Madrid	Jean-Christophe Péraud (FRA)	Margarita Fullana (ESP)
31 May 2008	(Andorra) Vallnord	Christoph Sauser (SUI)	Margarita Fullana (ESP)
31 May 2008	(Andorra) Vallnord	Burry Stander (RSA)	Eva Lechner (ITA)
31 May 2008	(Andorra) Vallnord	Geoff Kabush (CAN)	Marie-Hélène Prémont (CAN)
7 June 2008	(United Kingdom) Fort William	Florian Vogel (SUI)	Marie-Hélène Prémont (CAN)
7 June 2008	(United Kingdom) Fort William	Nino Schurter (SUI)	Margarita Fullana (ESP)
7 June 2008	(United Kingdom) Fort William	Christoph Sauser (SUI)	Sabine Spitz (GER)
27 July 2008	(Canada) Mont-Sainte-Anne	Julien Absalon (FRA)	Marie-Hélène Prémont (CAN)
27 July 2008	(Canada) Mont-Sainte-Anne	Geoff Kabush (CAN)	Catharine Pendrel (CAN)
27 July 2008	(Canada) Mont-Sainte-Anne	Burry Stander (RSA)	Lene Byberg (NOR)
3 August 2008	(Canada) Bromont	Julien Absalon (FRA)	Catharine Pendrel (CAN)
3 August 2008	(Canada) Bromont	Lukas Flückiger (SUI)	Marie-Hélène Prémont (CAN)
3 August 2008	(Canada) Bromont	Adam Craig (USA)	Kateřina Nash (CZE)
30 August 2008	(Australia) Canberra	Ralph Näf (SUI)	Irina Kalentieva (RUS)
30 August 2008	(Australia) Canberra	José Antonio Hermida (ESP)	Rosara Joseph (NZL)
30 August 2008	(Australia) Canberra	Geoff Kabush (CAN)	Catharine Pendrel (CAN)
14 September 2008	(Austria) Schladming	Christoph Sauser (SUI)	Maja Włoszczowska (POL)
14 September 2008	(Austria) Schladming	José Antonio Hermida (ESP)	Irina Kalentieva (RUS)
14 September 2008	(Austria) Schladming	Ivan Alvarez Gutierrez (ESP)	Marie-Hélène Prémont (CAN)
		Podium (Men)	Podium (Women)
Final Standings	UCI World Cup; Cross Country Championship	Julien Absalon (FRA)	Marie-Hélène Prémont (CAN)
Final Standings	UCI World Cup; Cross Country Championship	Christoph Sauser (SUI)	Catharine Pendrel (CAN)
Final Standings	UCI World Cup; Cross Country Championship	José Antonio Hermida (ESP)	Margarita Fullana (ESP)

== Downhill ==
Date	Venue	Podium (Men)	Podium (Women)
11 May 2008	(Slovenia) Maribor	Sam Hill (AUS)	Sabrina Jonnier (FRA)
11 May 2008	(Slovenia) Maribor	Julien Camellini (FRA)	Rachel Atherton (GBR)
11 May 2008	(Slovenia) Maribor	Steve Peat (GBR)	Emmeline Ragot (FRA)
1 June 2008	(Andorra) Vallnord	Gee Atherton (GBR)	Rachel Atherton (GBR)
1 June 2008	(Andorra) Vallnord	Sam Hill (AUS)	Sabrina Jonnier (FRA)
1 June 2008	(Andorra) Vallnord	Greg Minnaar (RSA)	Floriane Pugin (FRA)
8 June 2008	(United Kingdom) Fort William	Greg Minnaar (RSA)	Tracey Mosely (GBR)
8 June 2008	(United Kingdom) Fort William	Gee Atherton (GBR)	Sabrina Jonnier (FRA)
8 June 2008	(United Kingdom) Fort William	Steve Peat (GBR)	Rachel Atherton (GBR)
27 July 2008	(Canada) Mont-Sainte-Anne	Greg Minnaar (RSA)	Rachel Atherton (GBR)
27 July 2008	(Canada) Mont-Sainte-Anne	Sam Hill (AUS)	Sabrina Jonnier (FRA)
27 July 2008	(Canada) Mont-Sainte-Anne	Gee Atherton (GBR)	Tracey Mosely (GBR)
3 August 2008	(Canada) Bromont	Sam Hill (AUS)	Rachel Atherton (GBR)
3 August 2008	(Canada) Bromont	Greg Minnaar (RSA)	Sabrina Jonnier (FRA)
3 August 2008	(Canada) Bromont	Steve Peat (GBR)	Tracey Mosely (GBR)
31 August 2008	(Australia) Canberra	Greg Minnaar (RSA)	Tracey Mosely (GBR)
31 August 2008	(Australia) Canberra	Nathan Rennie (AUS)	Rachel Atherton (GBR)
31 August 2008	(Australia) Canberra	Gee Atherton (GBR)	Sabrina Jonnier (FRA)
14 September 2008	(Austria) Schladming	Sam Blenkinsop (NZ)	Rachel Atherton (GBR)
14 September 2008	(Austria) Schladming	Sam Hill (AUS)	Floriane Pugin (FRA)
14 September 2008	(Austria) Schladming	Gee Atherton (GBR)	Sabrina Jonnier (FRA)
		Podium (Men)	Podium (Women)
Final Standings	UCI World Cup; Downhill Championship	Greg Minnaar (RSA)	Rachel Atherton (GBR)
Final Standings	UCI World Cup; Downhill Championship	Sam Hill (AUS)	Sabrina Jonnier (FRA)
Final Standings	UCI World Cup; Downhill Championship	Gee Atherton (GBR)	Tracey Mosely (GBR)

== Marathon ==
Date	Venue	Podium (Men)	Podium (Women)
16 March 2008	(Turkey) Manavgat	Thomas Dietsch (FRA)	Pia Sundstedt (FIN)
16 March 2008	(Turkey) Manavgat	Alban Lakata (AUT)	Annabella Stropparo (ITA)
16 March 2008	(Turkey) Manavgat	Karl Platt (GER)	Esther Süss (SUI)
5 October 2008	(France) Ornans	Leonardo Páez (COL)	Petra Heinzi (SUI)
5 October 2008	(France) Ornans	Lukas Buchli (SUI)	Esther Süss (SUI)
5 October 2008	(France) Ornans	Karl Platt (GER)	Blaža Klemenčič (SLO)
		Podium (Men)	Podium (Women)
Final Standings	UCI World Cup; Marathon Championship	Leonardo Páez (COL)	Pia Sundstedt (FIN)
Final Standings	UCI World Cup; Marathon Championship	Thomas Dietsch (FRA)	Esther Süss (SUI)
Final Standings	UCI World Cup; Marathon Championship	Alban Lakata (AUT)	Blaža Klemenčič (SLO)

== Four-cross ==
Date	Venue	Podium (Men)	Podium (Women)
10 May 2008	(Slovenia) Maribor	Rafael Alvarez De Lara Lucas (ESP)	Anneke Beerten (NED)
10 May 2008	(Slovenia) Maribor	Guido Tschugg (GER)	Anita Molcik (AUT)
10 May 2008	(Slovenia) Maribor	Johannes Fischbach (GER)	Fionn Griffiths (GBR)
1 June 2008	(Andorra) Vallnord	Dan Atherton (GBR)	Anneke Beerten (NED)
1 June 2008	(Andorra) Vallnord	Brian Lopes (USA)	Mio Suemasa (JPN)
1 June 2008	(Andorra) Vallnord	Guido Tschugg (GER)	Fionn Griffiths (GBR)
7 June 2008	(United Kingdom) Fort William	Jared Graves (AUS)	Jana Horáková (CZE)
7 June 2008	(United Kingdom) Fort William	Joost Wichman (NED)	Rachel Seydoux (SUI)
7 June 2008	(United Kingdom) Fort William	Dan Atherton (GBR)	Anneke Beerten (NED)
27 July 2008	(Canada) Mont-Sainte-Anne	Rafael Alvarez De Lara Lucas (ESP)	Melissa Buhl (USA)
27 July 2008	(Canada) Mont-Sainte-Anne	Romain Saladini (FRA)	Mio Suemasa (JPN)
27 July 2008	(Canada) Mont-Sainte-Anne	Guido Tschugg (GER)	Fionn Griffiths (GBR)
3 August 2008	(Canada) Bromont	Rafael Alvarez De Lara Lucas (ESP)	Anneke Beerten (NED)
3 August 2008	(Canada) Bromont	Cédric Gracia (FRA)	Anita Molcik (AUT)
3 August 2008	(Canada) Bromont	Guido Tschugg (GER)	Mio Suemasa (JPN)
30 August 2008	(Australia) Canberra	Jared Graves (AUS)	Caroline Buchanan (AUS)
30 August 2008	(Australia) Canberra	Sam Willoughby (AUS)	Anneke Beerten (NED)
30 August 2008	(Australia) Canberra	Luke Madill (AUS)	Julia Boer (HUN)
13 September 2008	(Austria) Schladming	Romain Saladini (FRA)	Romana Labounková (CZE)
13 September 2008	(Austria) Schladming	Dan Atherton (GBR)	Anneke Beerten (NED)
13 September 2008	(Austria) Schladming	Joost Wichman (NED)	Jana Horáková (CZE)
		Podium (Men)	Podium (Women)
Final Standings	UCI World Cup; Four-Cross Championship	Rafael Alvarez De Lara Lucas (ESP)	Anneke Beerten (NED)
Final Standings	UCI World Cup; Four-Cross Championship	Guido Tschugg (GER)	Anita Molcik (AUT)
Final Standings	UCI World Cup; Four-Cross Championship	Dan Atherton (GBR)	Melissa Buhl (USA)

== See also ==
- 2008 UCI Mountain Bike & Trials World Championships
