= 2010 UCI Mountain Bike World Cup =

Series of races for all-terrain bicyclists

- Date: April–August 2010

The 2010 UCI Mountain Bike World Cup included three disciplines: cross-country, downhill and four-cross.

== Cross-country ==
| Date | Venue | Podium (Men) | Podium (Women) |
|---|---|---|---|
| 25 April 2010 | (United Kingdom) Dalby Forest | Nino Schurter (SUI) | Irina Kalentieva (RUS) |
| 25 April 2010 | (United Kingdom) Dalby Forest | Julien Absalon (FRA) | Willow Koerber (USA) |
| 25 April 2010 | (United Kingdom) Dalby Forest | Burry Stander (RSA) | Kateřina Nash (CZE) |
| 2 May 2010 | (Belgium) Houffalize | José Antonio Hermida (ESP) | Eva Lechner (ITA) |
| 2 May 2010 | (Belgium) Houffalize | Manuel Fumic (GER) | Willow Koerber (USA) |
| 2 May 2010 | (Belgium) Houffalize | Wolfram Kurschat (GER) | Elisabeth Osl (AUT) |
| 23 May 2010 | (Germany) Offenburg | Julien Absalon (FRA) | Catharine Pendrel (CAN) |
| 23 May 2010 | (Germany) Offenburg | Nino Schurter (SUI) | Georgia Gould (USA) |
| 23 May 2010 | (Germany) Offenburg | Jaroslav Kulhavý (CZE) | Esther Süss (SUI) |
| 25 July 2010 | (Switzerland) Champéry | Florian Vogel (SUI) | Nathalie Schneitter (SUI) |
| 25 July 2010 | (Switzerland) Champéry | Jaroslav Kulhavý (CZE) | Eva Lechner (ITA) |
| 25 July 2010 | (Switzerland) Champéry | Nino Schurter (SUI) | Willow Koerber (USA) |
| 31 July 2010 | (Italy) Val di Sole | Nino Schurter (SUI) | Maja Włoszczowska (POL) |
| 31 July 2010 | (Italy) Val di Sole | Julien Absalon (FRA) | Catharine Pendrel (CAN) |
| 31 July 2010 | (Italy) Val di Sole | Florian Vogel (SUI) | Irina Kalentieva (RUS) |
| 28 August 2010 | (United States) Windham | Jaroslav Kulhavý (CZE) | Catharine Pendrel (CAN) |
| 28 August 2010 | (United States) Windham | Nino Schurter (SUI) | Marie-Hélène Prémont (CAN) |
| 28 August 2010 | (United States) Windham | Florian Vogel (SUI) | Georgia Gould (USA) |
| | | Podium (Men) | Podium (Women) |
| Final Standings | UCI World Cup; Cross Country Championship | Nino Schurter (SUI) | Catharine Pendrel (CAN) |
| Final Standings | UCI World Cup; Cross Country Championship | Julien Absalon (FRA) | Willow Koerber (USA) |
| Final Standings | UCI World Cup; Cross Country Championship | Jaroslav Kulhavý (CZE) | Eva Lechner (ITA) |

== Downhill ==
| Date | Venue | Podium (Men) | Podium (Women) |
|---|---|---|---|
| 16 May 2010 | (Slovenia) Maribor | Greg Minnaar (RSA) | Rachel Atherton (GBR) |
| 16 May 2010 | (Slovenia) Maribor | Gee Atherton (GBR) | Sabrina Jonnier (FRA) |
| 16 May 2010 | (Slovenia) Maribor | Brendan Fairclough (GBR) | Floriane Pugin (FRA) |
| 6 June 2010 | (United Kingdom) Fort William | Gee Atherton (GBR) | Sabrina Jonnier (FRA) |
| 6 June 2010 | (United Kingdom) Fort William | Cameron Cole (NZL) | Rachel Atherton (GBR) |
| 6 June 2010 | (United Kingdom) Fort William | Greg Minnaar (RSA) | Floriane Pugin (FRA) |
| 20 June 2010 | (Austria) Leogang | Greg Minnaar (RSA) | Sabrina Jonnier (FRA) |
| 20 June 2010 | (Austria) Leogang | Gee Atherton (GBR) | Emmeline Ragot (FRA) |
| 20 June 2010 | (Austria) Leogang | Aaron Gwin (USA) | Floriane Pugin (FRA) |
| 25 July 2010 | (Switzerland) Champery | Gee Atherton (GBR) | Emmeline Ragot (FRA) |
| 25 July 2010 | (Switzerland) Champery | Greg Minnaar (RSA) | Sabrina Jonnier (FRA) |
| 25 July 2010 | (Switzerland) Champery | Brendan Fairclough (GBR) | Myriam Nicole (FRA) |
| 1 August 2010 | (Italy) Val di Sole | Marc Beaumont (GBR) | Emmeline Ragot (FRA) |
| 1 August 2010 | (Italy) Val di Sole | Greg Minnaar (RSA) | Sabrina Jonnier (FRA) |
| 1 August 2010 | (Italy) Val di Sole | Gee Atherton (GBR) | Tracey Mosely (GBR) |
| 29 August 2010 | (United States) Windham | Gee Atherton (GBR) | Rachel Atherton (GBR) |
| 29 August 2010 | (United States) Windham | Greg Minnaar (RSA) | Tracey Mosely (GBR) |
| 29 August 2010 | (United States) Windham | Samuel Blenkinsop (NZL) | Emmeline Ragot (FRA) |
| | | Podium (Men) | Podium (Women) |
| Final Standings | UCI World Cup; Downhill Championship | Gee Atherton (GBR) | Sabrina Jonnier (FRA) |
| Final Standings | UCI World Cup; Downhill Championship | Greg Minnaar (RSA) | Floriane Pugin (FRA) |
| Final Standings | UCI World Cup; Downhill Championship | Aaron Gwin (USA) | Myriam Nicole (FRA) |

== Four-Cross ==
| Date | Venue | Podium (Men) | Podium (Women) |
|---|---|---|---|
| 1 May 2010 | (Belgium) Houffalize | Jared Graves (AUS) | Jana Horáková (CZE) |
| 1 May 2010 | (Belgium) Houffalize | Tomáš Slavík (CZE) | Anita Molcik (AUT) |
| 1 May 2010 | (Belgium) Houffalize | Michal Prokop (CZE) | Emmeline Ragot (FRA) |
| 15 May 2010 | (Slovenia) Maribor | Michal Maroši (CZE) | Fionn Griffiths (GBR) |
| 15 May 2010 | (Slovenia) Maribor | Jared Graves (AUS) | Sarsha Huntington (AUS) |
| 15 May 2010 | (Slovenia) Maribor | Joost Wichman (NED) | Anneke Beerten (NED) |
| 5 June 2010 | (United Kingdom) Fort William | Jared Graves (AUS) | Jana Horáková (CZE) |
| 5 June 2010 | (United Kingdom) Fort William | Joost Wichman (NED) | Anita Molcik (AUT) |
| 5 June 2010 | (United Kingdom) Fort William | Michal Prokop (CZE) | Romana Labounková (CZE) |
| 19 June 2010 | (Austria) Leogang | Jared Graves (AUS) | Anneke Beerten (NED) |
| 19 June 2010 | (Austria) Leogang | Tomáš Slavík (CZE) | Joanna Petterson (RSA) |
| 19 June 2010 | (Austria) Leogang | Michal Maroši (CZE) | Romana Labounková (CZE) |
| 31 July 2010 | (Italy) Val di Sole | Roger Rinderknecht (SUI) | Anneke Beerten (NED) |
| 31 July 2010 | (Italy) Val di Sole | Tomáš Slavík (CZE) | Anita Molcik (AUT) |
| 31 July 2010 | (Italy) Val di Sole | Michal Prokop (CZE) | Katy Curd (GBR) |
| 28 August 2010 | (United States) Windham | Jared Graves (AUS) | Anita Molcik (AUT) |
| 28 August 2010 | (United States) Windham | Michal Prokop (CZE) | Caroline Buchanan (AUS) |
| 28 August 2010 | (United States) Windham | Tomáš Slavík (CZE) | Jana Horáková (CZE) |
| | | Podium (Men) | Podium (Women) |
| Final Standings | UCI World Cup; Four-Cross Championship | Jared Graves (AUS) | Anita Molcik (AUT) |
| Final Standings | UCI World Cup; Four-Cross Championship | Tomáš Slavík (CZE) | Anneke Beerten (NED) |
| Final Standings | UCI World Cup; Four-Cross Championship | Joost Wichman (NED) | Jana Horáková (CZE) |

== See also ==
- 2010 UCI Mountain Bike & Trials World Championships
