= UCI Mountain Bike & Trials World Championships – Women's four-cross =

The women's four-cross is an event at the annual UCI Mountain Bike & Trials World Championships. It has been held since the 2002 championships, having replaced the dual event. In 2014 and 2015 the four-cross events were held separately from the UCI Mountain Bike & Trials World Championships as the UCI Four-cross World Championships.

Championships	Gold	Silver	Bronze
2002 Kaprun	Anne-Caroline Chausson; France	Katrina Miller; Australia	Sabrina Jonnier; France
2003 Lugano	Anne-Caroline Chausson; France	Sabrina Jonnier; France	Jill Kintner; United States
2004 Les Gets	Jana Horáková; Czech Republic	Jill Kintner; United States	Tara Llanes; United States
2005 Livigno	Jill Kintner; United States	Katrina Miller; Australia	Tara Llanes; United States
2006 Rotorua	Jill Kintner; United States	Anneke Beerten; Netherlands	Anita Molcik; Austria
2007 Fort William	Jill Kintner; United States	Anneke Beerten; Netherlands	Melissa Buhl; United States
2008 Val Di Sole	Melissa Buhl; United States	Jana Horáková; Czech Republic	Romana Labounková; Czech Republic
2009 Canberra	Caroline Buchanan; Australia	Jill Kintner; United States	Melissa Buhl; United States
2010 Mont-Sainte-Anne	Caroline Buchanan; Australia	Jana Horáková; Czech Republic	Romana Labounková; Czech Republic
2011 Champery	Anneke Beerten; Netherlands	Fionn Griffiths; Great Britain	Céline Gros; France
2012 Leogang-Saalfelden	Anneke Beerten; Netherlands	Romana Labounková; Czech Republic	Céline Gros; France
2013 Leogang-Saalfelden	Caroline Buchanan; Australia	Katy Curd; Great Britain	Céline Gros; France
2014 Leogang-Saalfelden	Katy Curd; Great Britain	Anneke Beerten; Netherlands	Steffi Marth; Germany
2015 Val Di Sole	Anneke Beerten; Netherlands	Lucia Oetjen; Switzerland	Steffi Marth; Germany
2016 Val Di Sole	Caroline Buchanan; Australia	Franziska Meyer; Germany	Anneke Beerten; Netherlands
2017 Val Di Sole	Caroline Buchanan; Australia	Romana Labounková; Czech Republic	Helene Fruhwirth; Austria
2018 Val Di Sole	Romana Labounková; Czech Republic	Natasha Bradley; Great Britain	Raphaela Richter; Germany
2019 Val Di Sole	Romana Labounková; Czech Republic	Natasha Bradley; Great Britain	Mathilde Bernard; France

== Medal table ==
Rank	Nation	Gold	Silver	Bronze	Total
1	Australia	5	2	0	7
2	United States	4	2	5	11
3	Czech Republic	3	4	2	9
4	Netherlands	3	3	1	7
5	France	2	1	5	8
6	Great Britain	1	4	0	5
7	Germany	0	1	3	4
8	Switzerland	0	1	0	1
9	Austria	0	0	2	2
Totals (9 entries)		18	18	18	54
