= 2006 UCI Mountain Bike World Cup =

- Date: April–September 2006

The 2006 UCI Mountain Bike World Cup included four disciplines: marathon, cross-country, downhill and 4-cross.

== Cross-country ==
| Date | Venue | Winner (Men) | Winner (Women) |
|---|---|---|---|
| 1 April 2006 | (Netherlands Antilles) Curaçao | (Netherlands) Bart Brentjens | (Norway) Gunn-Rita Dahle |
| 14 May 2006 | (Spain) Madrid | (France) Julien Absalon | (Norway) Gunn-Rita Dahle |
| 21 May 2006 | (Belgium) Spa Francorchamps | (France) Julien Absalon | (Norway) Gunn-Rita Dahle |
| 27 May 2006 | (United Kingdom) Fort William | (France) Julien Absalon | (Germany) Nina Göhl |
| 24 June 2006 | (Canada) Mont-Sainte-Anne | (Switzerland) Christoph Sauser | (Canada) Marie-Helene Prémont |
| 9 September 2006 | (Austria) Schladming | (Switzerland) Christoph Sauser | (Canada) Marie-Helene Prémont |
| Final Standings | UCI World Cup; Cross Country Championship | (France) Julien Absalon | (Norway) Gunn-Rita Dahle |
| Final Standings | UCI World Cup; Cross Country Championship | (Switzerland) Christoph Sauser | (Canada) Marie-Helene Prémont |
| Final Standings | UCI World Cup; Cross Country Championship | (Spain) José Antonio Hermida | (Russia) Irina Kalentieva |

== Downhill ==
| Date | Venue | Winner (Men) | Winner (Women) |
|---|---|---|---|
| 7 May 2006 | (Spain) Vigo | (Australia) Michael Hannah | (United Kingdom) Tracy Moseley |
| 28 May 2006 | (United Kingdom) Fort William | (Australia) Sam Hill | (United Kingdom) Tracy Moseley |
| 4 June 2006 | (Germany) Willingen | (United Kingdom) Steve Peat | (United Kingdom) Tracy Moseley |
| 24 June 2006 | (Canada) Mont-Sainte-Anne | (Australia) Chris Kovarik | (France) Sabrina Jonnier |
| 1 July 2006 | (Brazil) Balneário Camboriú | (Finland) Matti Lehikoinen | (United Kingdom) Rachel Atherton |
| 10 September 2006 | (Austria) Schladming | (Australia) Sam Hill | (France) Sabrina Jonnier |
| Final Standings | UCI World Cup; Downhill Championship | (United Kingdom) Steve Peat | (United Kingdom) Tracy Moseley |
| Final Standings | UCI World Cup; Downhill Championship | (Australia) Sam Hill | (France) Sabrina Jonnier |
| Final Standings | UCI World Cup; Downhill Championship | (South Africa) Greg Minnaar | (United Kingdom) Rachel Atherton |

== Marathon ==
| Date | Venue | Winner (Men) | Winner (Women) |
|---|---|---|---|
| 6 May 2006 | (Greece) Naousa | (Colombia) Leonardo Páez | (Switzerland) Daniela Louis |
| 17 June 2006 | (Canada) Mont-Sainte-Anne | (Austria) Alban Lakata | (Finland) Pia Sundstedt |
| 9 July 2006 | (Italy) Niederdorf | (Colombia) Leonardo Páez | (Switzerland) Esther Süss |
| 29 July 2006 | (France) Val Thorens | (New Zealand) Kashi Leuchs | (Finland) Pia Sundstedt |
| Final standings | UCI World Cup; Marathon Championship | (Colombia) Leonardo Páez | (Finland) Pia Sundstedt |
| Final standings | UCI World Cup; Marathon Championship | (France) Thomas Dietsch | (Switzerland) Esther Süss |
| Final standings | UCI World Cup; Marathon Championship | (Italy) Roland Stauder | (Italy) Elena Giacomuzzi |

== Four-cross ==
| Date | Venue | Winner (Men) | Winner (Women) |
|---|---|---|---|
| 6 May 2006 | (Spain) Vigo | (Czech Republic) Michal Prokop | (United States) Jill Kintner |
| 27 May 2006 | (United Kingdom) Fort William | (Czech Republic) Michal Prokop | (United States) Jill Kintner |
| 3 June 2006 | (Germany) Willingen | (Australia) Jared Graves | (United States) Jill Kintner |
| 24 June 2006 | (Canada) Mont-Sainte-Anne | (Czech Republic) Michal Prokop | (Australia) Katrina Miller |
| 1 July 2006 | (Brazil) Balneário Camboriú | (Czech Republic) Michal Prokop | (United States) Jill Kintner |
| 9 September 2006 | (Austria) Schladming | (Czech Republic) Kamil Tatarkovic | (United Kingdom) Fionn Griffiths |
| Final Standings | UCI World Cup; Four-Cross Championship | (Czech Republic) Michal Prokop | (United States) Jill Kintner |
| Final Standings | UCI World Cup; Four-Cross Championship | (Australia) Jared Graves | (Australia) Katrina Miller |
| Final Standings | UCI World Cup; Four-Cross Championship | (Czech Republic) Kamil Tatarkovic | (United States) Tara Llanes |

== See also ==
- 2006 UCI Mountain Bike & Trials World Championships
