= 2005 UCI Mountain Bike World Cup =

Biking competition

- Date: April–September 2005

The 2005 UCI Mountain Bike World Cup included four disciplines: marathon, cross-country, downhill and 4-cross.

== Cross-country ==
Date	Venue	Winner (Men)	Winner (Women)
24 April 2005	(Belgium) Spa Francorchamps	(France) Julien Absalon	(Canada) Marie-Hélène Prémont
8 May 2005	(Spain) Madrid	(France) Julien Absalon	(Norway) Gunn-Rita Dahle
29 May 2005	(Belgium) Houffalize	(Italy) Marco Bui	(Norway) Gunn-Rita Dahle
4 June 2005	(Germany) Willingen	(Switzerland) Christoph Sauser	(Norway) Gunn-Rita Dahle
25 June 2005	(Canada) Mont-Sainte-Anne	(Switzerland) Christoph Sauser	(Canada) Marie-Hélène Prémont
3 July 2005	(Brazil) Balneário Camboriú	(Spain) José Antonio Hermida	(Norway) Gunn-Rita Dahle
9 July 2005	(United States) Angel Fire Resort	(Switzerland) Christoph Sauser	(Norway) Gunn-Rita Dahle
10 September 2005	(United Kingdom) Fort William	(Switzerland) Ralph Naef	(Norway) Gunn-Rita Dahle
Final Standings	UCI World Cup; Cross Country Championship	(Switzerland) Christoph Sauser	(Norway) Gunn-Rita Dahle
Final Standings	UCI World Cup; Cross Country Championship	(Spain) José Antonio Hermida	(Germany) Sabine Spitz
Final Standings	UCI World Cup; Cross Country Championship	(France) Julien Absalon	(Canada) Marie-Hélène Prémont

== Downhill ==
Date	Venue	Winner (Men)	Winner (Women)
30 April 2005	(Spain) Vigo	(United Kingdom) Steve Peat	(France) Sabrina Jonnier
5 June 2005	(Germany) Willingen	(South Africa) Greg Minnaar	(France) Anne-Caroline Chausson
12 June 2005	(Austria) Schladming	(Australia) Sam Hill	(France) Anne-Caroline Chausson
26 June 2005	(Canada) Mont-Sainte-Anne	(France) Fabien Barel	(United Kingdom) Tracy Mosely
3 July 2005	(Brazil) Balneário Camboriú	(South Africa) Greg Minnaar	(United Kingdom) Tracy Mosely
10 July 2005	(United States) Angel Fire Resort	(South Africa) Greg Minnaar	(France) Sabrina Jonnier
21 August 2005	(Italy) Pila Vallée d'Aoste	(Australia) Sam Hill	(France) Anne-Caroline Chausson
11 September 2005	(United Kingdom) Fort William	(United Kingdom) Steve Peat	(United Kingdom) Tracy Mosely
Final Standings	UCI World Cup; Downhill Championship	(South Africa) Greg Minnaar	(France) Sabrina Jonnier
Final Standings	UCI World Cup; Downhill Championship	(Australia) Sam Hill	(United Kingdom) Tracy Mosely
Final Standings	UCI World Cup; Downhill Championship	(Australia) Nathan Rennie	(United Kingdom) Rachel Atherton

== Marathon ==
Date	Venue	Winner (Men)	Winner (Women)
10 April 2005	(Cyprus) Limassol	(Italy) Massimo de Bertolis	(Switzerland) Petra Henzi
1 May 2005	(Italy) Garda Trentino	(Netherlands) Bart Brentjens	(Italy) Paola Pezzo
18 June 2005	(Canada) Mont-Sainte-Anne	(United Kingdom) Liam Killeen	(Brazil) Jaqueline Mourão
10 July 2005	(Austria) Bad Goisern	(Germany) Moritz Milatz	(Sweden) Anna Enocsson
7 August 2005	(France) Oisans	(France) Thomas Dietsch	(Switzerland) Esther Süss
13 August 2005	(Sweden) Falun	(Sweden) Fredrik Kessiakoff	(Sweden) Anna Enocsson
1 October 2005	(Germany) St. Wendel	(Italy) Yader Zoli	(Slovenia) Blaza Klemencic
14 October 2005	(France) Fréjus	(Belgium) Roel Paulissen	(Canada) Alison Sydor
Final Standings	UCI World Cup; Marathon Championship	(Italy) Mauro Bettin	(Switzerland) Daniela Louis
Final Standings	UCI World Cup; Marathon Championship	(Austria) Alban Lakata	(Switzerland) Esther Süss
Final Standings	UCI World Cup; Marathon Championship	(Italy) Dario Acquaroli	(Sweden) Anna Enocsson

== Four-cross ==
Date	Venue	Winner (Men)	Winner (Women)
1 May 2005	(Spain) Vigo	(Czech Republic) Michal Prokop	(United States) Jill Kintner
5 June 2005	(Germany) Willingen	cancelled	(Netherlands) Anneke Beerten
11 June 2005	(Austria) Schladming	(United States) Brian Lopes	(Netherlands) Anneke Beerten
25 June 2005	(Canada) Mont-Sainte-Anne	(Czech Republic) Michal Prokop	(United States) Jill Kintner
4 July 2005	(Brazil) Balneário Camboriú	(Switzerland) Roger Rinderknecht	(United States) Jill Kintner
9 July 2005	(United States) Angel Fire Resort	(United States) Brian Lopes	(United States) Jill Kintner
21 August 2005	(Italy) Pila Vallée d'Aoste	(Czech Republic) Michal Prokop	(United States) Jill Kintner
10 September 2005	(United Kingdom) Fort William	(Norway) Leiv Ove Nordmark	(United States) Jill Kintner
Final Standings	UCI World Cup; Four-Cross Championship	(United States) Brian Lopes	(United States) Jill Kintner
Final Standings	UCI World Cup; Four-Cross Championship	(Czech Republic) Michal Prokop	(Netherlands) Anneke Beerten
Final Standings	UCI World Cup; Four-Cross Championship	(France) Cédric Gracia	(Austria) Anita Molcik

== See also ==
- 2005 UCI Mountain Bike & Trials World Championships
