= 4-cross =

4-cross may refer to:

- Four-cross bike racing
- 4-orthoplex polytope
