= Geoff Kabush =

Canadian cyclist

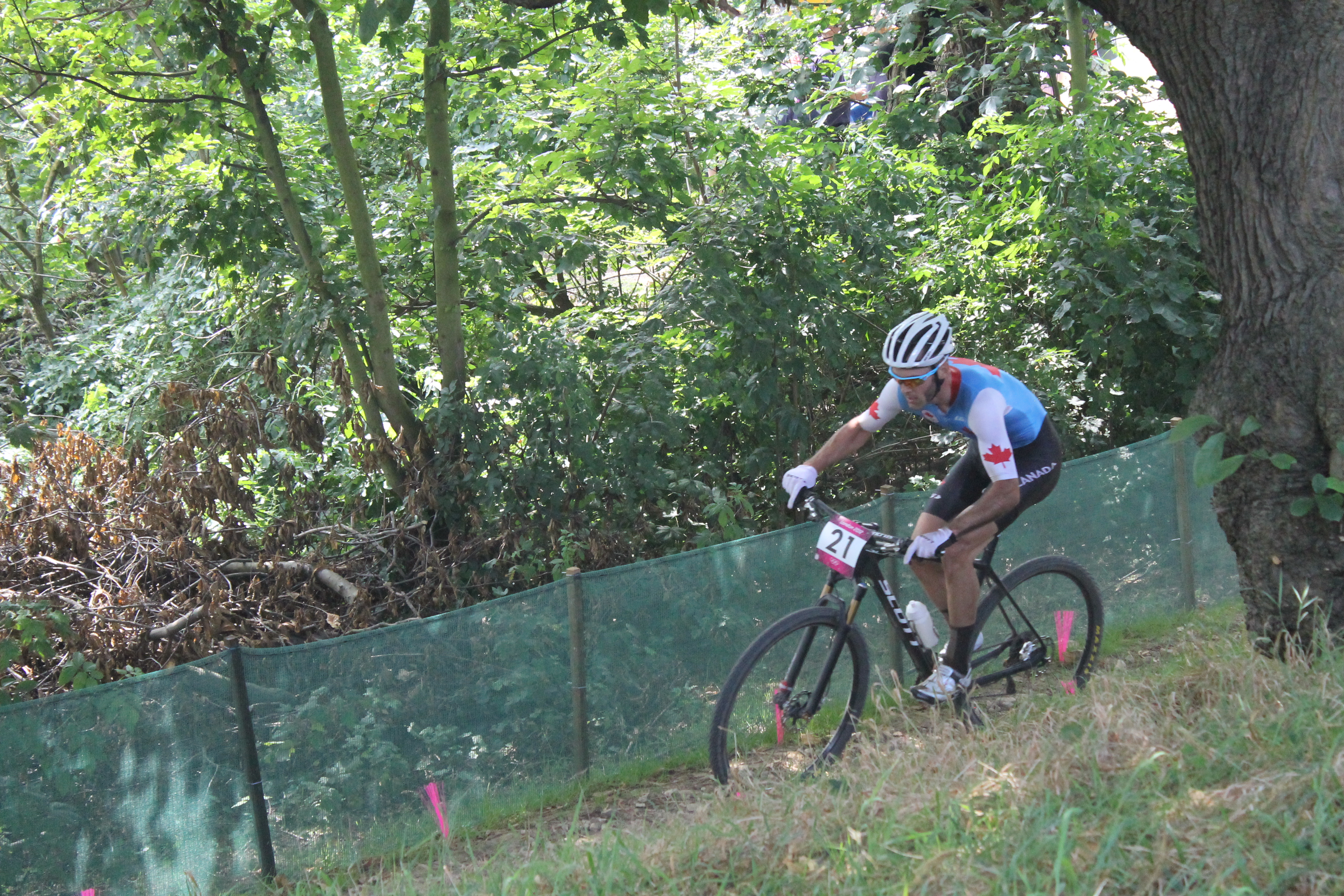
- Geoff Kabush at the 2012 Summer Olympics

Personal information
- Born: 14 April 1977 (age 49) Courtenay, British Columbia, Canada
- Height: 1.88 m (6 ft 2 in)
- Weight: 76 kg (168 lb)

Cycling career
- Sport: Cycling
- Disciplines: Cyclo-cross; Mountain bike; Road
- Role: Rider

Professional teams
- 2005: Jittery Joe's–Kalahari
- 2007–2008: Symmetrics
- 2008–2011: Maxxis
- 2012–2014: Scott–3rox Racing

Major wins
- Mountain bike XC World Cup 1 individual win (2009)

Geoff David Kabush is a Canadian cyclo-cross cyclist and cross-country mountain biker. At the 2000 Summer Olympics, he finished in 9th place in the cross-country race. He then competed in the same event at the 2008 Summer Olympics, finishing in 20th place. At the 2012 Summer Olympics, he again competed in the Men's cross-country at Hadleigh Farm, finishing in 8th place. He has also been successful in cyclo-cross, having won the Canadian national cyclo-cross championship five times.

== Major results ==
=== Cyclo-cross ===
2004–2005
1st National Championships
1st Gran Prix of Gloucester 1
2nd Gran Prix of Gloucester 2
2nd Beacon Cyclo-cross
3rd Clif Bar Grand Prix
3rd Star-Crossed
2005–2006
3rd Star-Crossed
2006–2007
2nd National Championships
2nd Scion Stumptown Cup
3rd Star-Crossed
2007–2008
2nd Fort Lewis College SquawkerCross
2008–2009
1st National Championships
1st Jim Horner Grand Prix
2009–2010
1st National Championships
1st Jim Horner Grand Prix
2010–2011
USGP of Cyclocross

1st Mercer Cup Day 1
3rd Mercer Cup Day 2

2011–2012
USGP of Cyclocross

2nd Fort Collins Cup Day 1
3rd Fort Collins Cup Day 2
3rd Derby City Cup Day 2
3rd Bend Day 2

2012–2013
1st National Championships
1st BC Grand Prix
USGP of Cyclocross

3rd New Belgium Cup Day 2

2013–2014
1st National Championships
1st BC Grand Prix
2nd Deschutes Brewery Cup
3rd CrossVegas
2014–2015
1st Manitoba Grand Prix
2nd National Championships
2015–2016
2nd National Championships
2nd Manitoba Grand Prix
2016–2017
2nd National Championships
2017–2018
2nd National Championships
2018–2019
2nd National Championships

=== Mountain bike ===
2005
1st Cross-country, National Championships
2006
1st Cross-country, National Championships
2007
1st Cross-country, Pan American Championships
1st Cross-country, National Championships
2008
UCI XC World Cup

2nd Vallnord
2nd Mont-Sainte-Anne
3rd Canberra

2009
1st Cross-country, National Championships
UCI XC World Cup

1st Bromont
3rd Mont-Sainte-Anne

2nd Team relay, UCI World Championships
2010
1st Cross-country, National Championships
2014
1st Cross-country, National Championships
2016
1st Marathon, National Championships

=== Road ===
2017
1st Tour de Nez
