= Tomáš Slavík (cyclist) =

Czech mountain biker

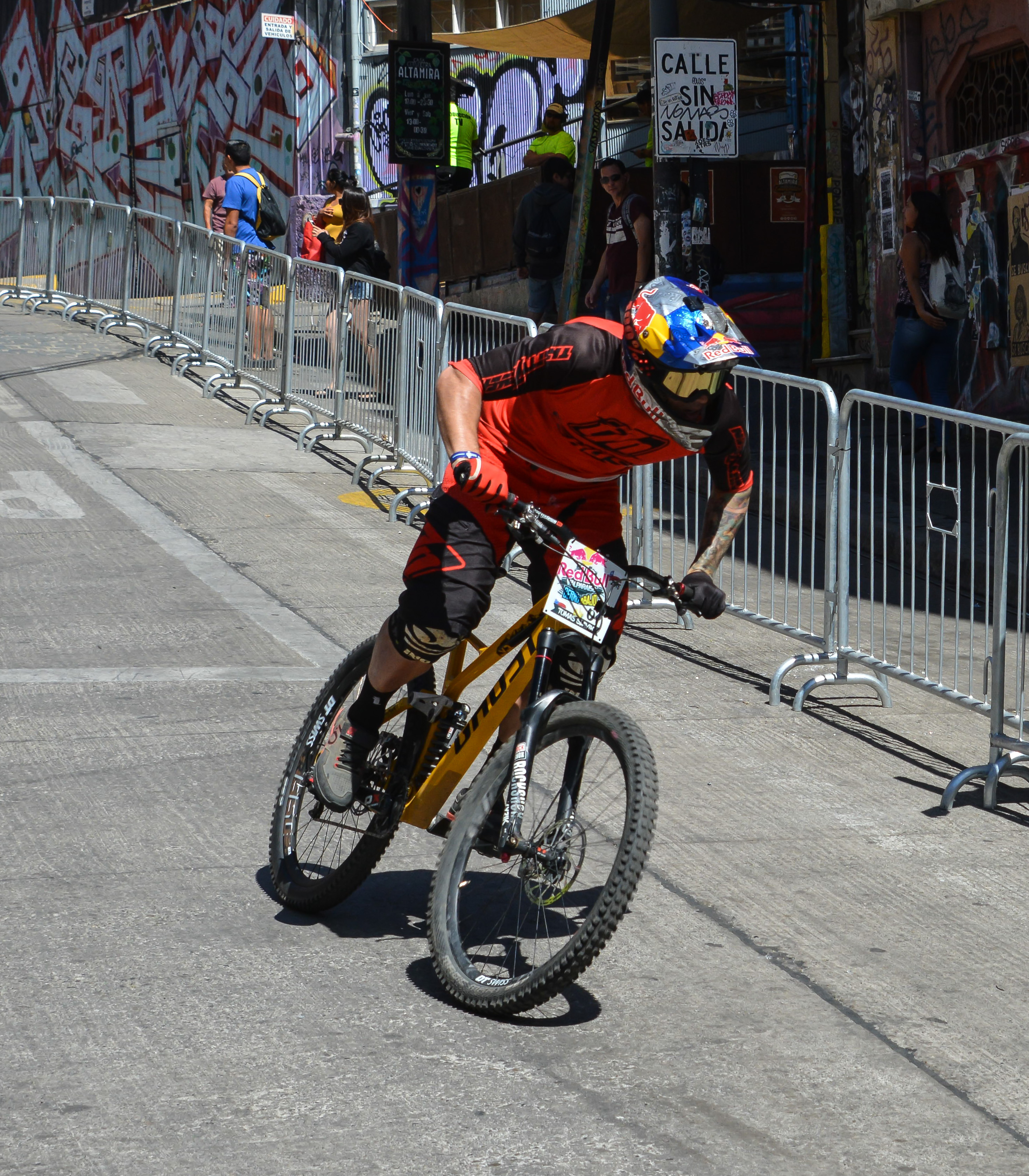
- Slavík at the 2018 Valparaíso Cerro Abajo

Personal information
- Born: 12 June 1987 (age 39) Brno, Czechoslovakia

Cycling career
- Sport: Cycling
- Discipline: Mountain bike
- Role: Rider
- Rider type: Four-cross
Medal record
Representing Czech Republic
Mountain bike racing
World Championships
Gold medal – first place	2010 Mont Sainte-Anne	Four-cross
Gold medal – first place	2014 Leogang	Four-cross
Gold medal – first place	2021 Val di Sole	Four-cross
Silver medal – second place	2018 Val di Sole	Four-cross
Bronze medal – third place	2012 Leogang-Saalfelden	Four-cross
European Championships
Silver medal – second place	2010 Willingen	Four-cross
Bronze medal – third place	2009 Ajdovščina	Four-cross

Tomáš Slavík (born 12 June 1987) is a Czech professional mountain biker, who specializes in four-cross. He won the UCI Four-Cross World Championships in 2010, 2014 and 2021 and finished second in 2018. He also finished second overall and at the 2010 UCI Four-Cross World Cup and third the following year.
