= José Antonio Hermida =

Spanish cyclist (born 1978)

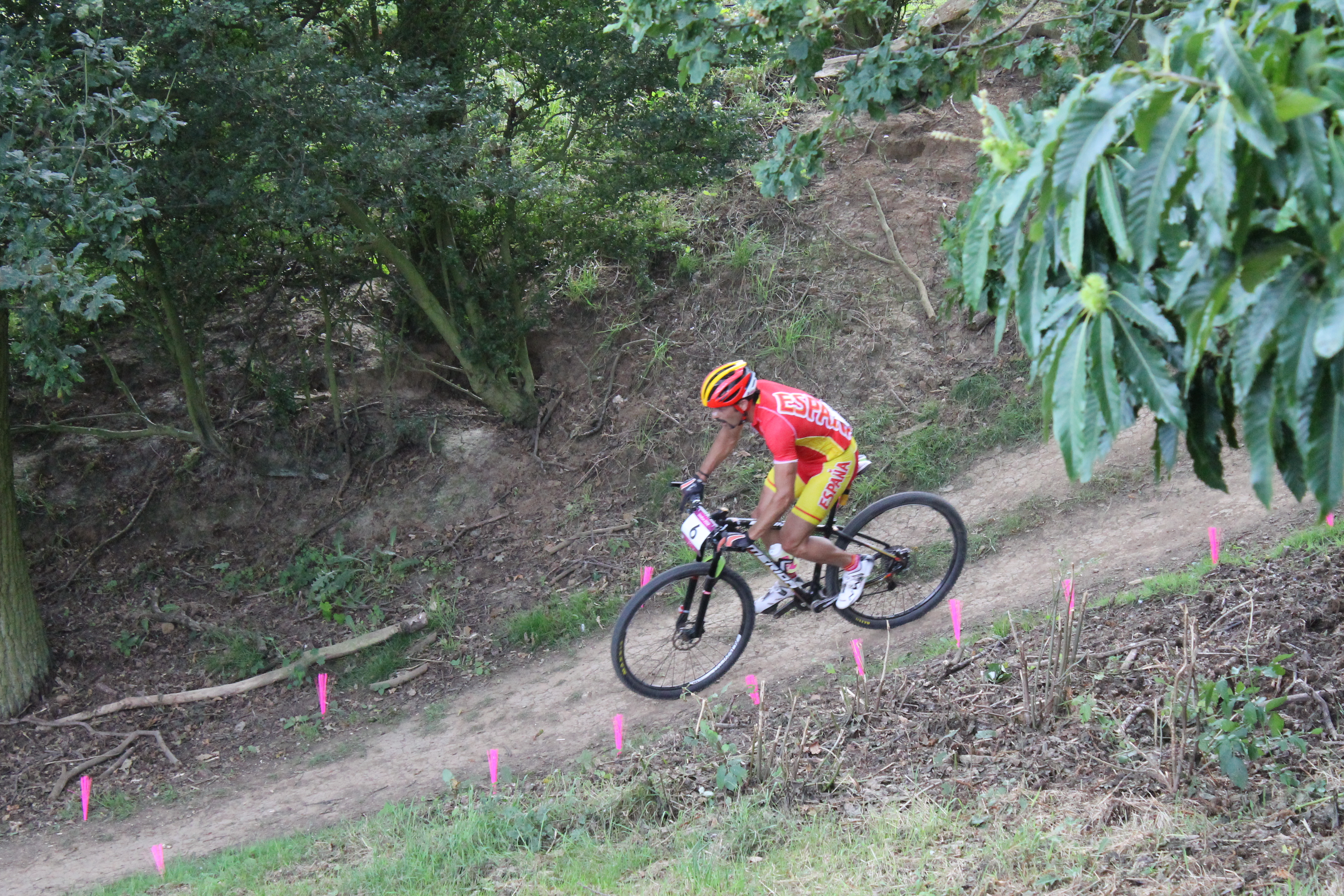
- Hermida at the 2012 Summer Olympics

Personal information
- Full name: José Antonio Hermida Ramos
- Born: 24 August 1978 (age 48) Puigcerdà, Spain

Cycling career
- Sport: Cycling
- Discipline: Mountain bike racing
- Role: Rider
- Rider type: Cross-country

Major wins
- Cyclo-cross National Championships (2007, 2008) Mountain bike World XC Championships (2010) European XC Championships (2002, 2004, 2007) National XC Championships (2009, 2011, 2013, 2014) XC World Cup 6 individual wins (2001, 2005, 2007, 2009, 2010)
Medal record
Representing Spain
Men's mountain bike racing
Olympic Games
Silver medal – second place	2004 Athens	Cross-country
World Championships
Gold medal – first place	2010 Mont Sainte-Anne	Cross-country
Bronze medal – third place	2005 Livigno	Cross-country
Bronze medal – third place	2013 Pietermaritzburg	Cross-country

José Antonio Hermida Ramos (born 24 August 1978 in Puigcerdà, Girona) is a Spanish cyclist of Catalan origin specializing in competitive mountain biking. He won the silver medal at the 2004 Summer Olympics in Athens, Greece after having finished in fourth place in the 2000 Summer Olympics.

== Major results ==
=== Cyclo-cross ===
2006–2007
1st National Championships
2007–2008
1st National Championships
2nd Ispaster
2009–2010
1st Valencia
2nd National Championships
2010–2011
2nd National Championships
2011–2012
1st Valencia
3rd Asteasu
2014–2015
3rd National Championships

=== Mountain bike ===
1996
1st Cross-country, UCI World Junior Championships
2000
1st Cross-country, UCI World Under-23 Championships
UCI XC World Cup

3rd Houffalize

2001
2nd Overall UCI XC World Cup

1st Napa Valley
3rd Houffalize

2002
1st Cross-country, UEC European Championships
2003
UCI XC World Cup

2nd Grouse Mountain

2004
1st Cross-country, UEC European Championships
2nd Cross-country, Olympic Games
3rd Overall UCI XC World Cup

3rd Schladming
3rd Mont Sainte-Anne

2005
2nd Overall UCI XC World Cup

1st Santa Catarina
2nd Madrid
3rd Houffalize

3rd Cross-country, UCI World Championships
2006
3rd Overall UCI XC World Cup

2nd Spa-Francorchamps
2nd Fort William

2007
1st Cross-country, UEC European Championships
2nd Overall UCI XC World Cup

1st Houffalize
2nd Mont Sainte-Anne
2nd Saint-Félicien

2008
3rd Overall UCI XC World Cup
2009
1st Cross-country, National Championships
2nd Cross-country, UEC European Championships
2nd Overall UCI XC World Cup

1st Pietermaritzburg
1st Schladming
2nd Mont Sainte-Anne
2nd Bromont

4th Cross-country, UCI World Championships
2010
1st Cross-country, UCI World Championships
UCI XC World Cup

1st Houffalize

5th Cross-country, UEC European Championships
2011
1st Cross-country, National Championships
UCI XC World Cup

3rd Mont-Sainte-Anne
4th Pietermaritzburg
4th Nové Město

2012
UCI XC World Cup

2nd Mont-Sainte-Anne
5th Val-d'Isère

4th Cross-country, Olympic Games
2013
1st Cross-country, National Championships
2014
1st Cross-country, National Championships
