= Lene Byberg =

Norwegian cyclist

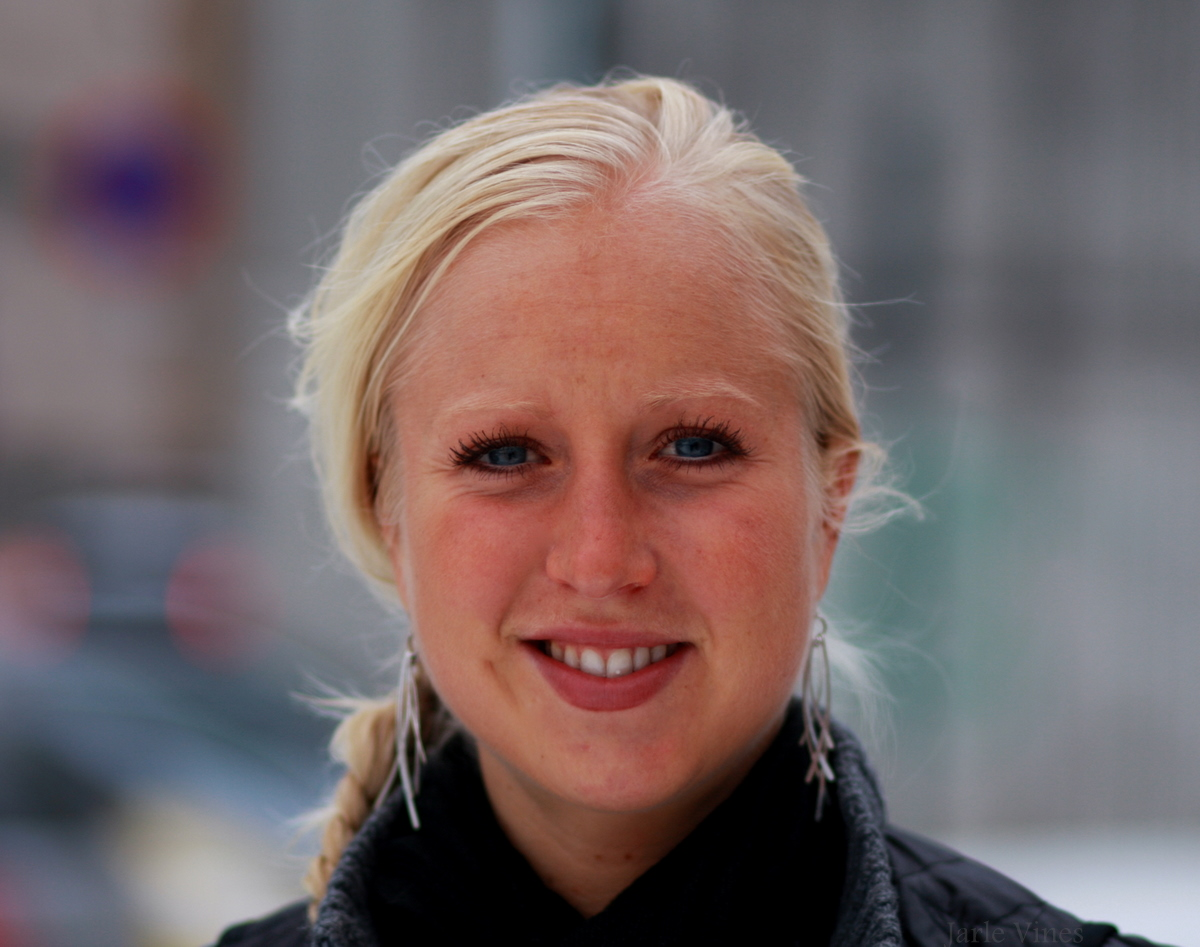
Lene Byberg in Sandnes 2010

Lene Byberg (born 25 November 1982) is a Norwegian cross-country mountain biker, and former road bicycle racer. She has participated in the Olympic Games in both road cycling and mountain biking.

== Olympic games ==
Byberg competed in road cycling at the 2004 Summer Olympic Games in Athens. She competed in mountain biking at the 2008 Summer Olympic Games in Beijing, where she finished 13th in the cross country event.

== World championships ==
Byberg won the silver medal in the 2009 cross country world championships in Canberra, Australia.

== UCI World Cup ==
Lene Byberg came in second overall in the 2009 UCI cross-country World Cup.

== National championships ==
Byberg became national champion in road cycling in 2004. In mountain biking, she won the Norwegian championship in cross country in 2006 and again in 2007, and became national champion in marathon in 2005 and 2006.
