= Ralph Näf =

Swiss cyclist

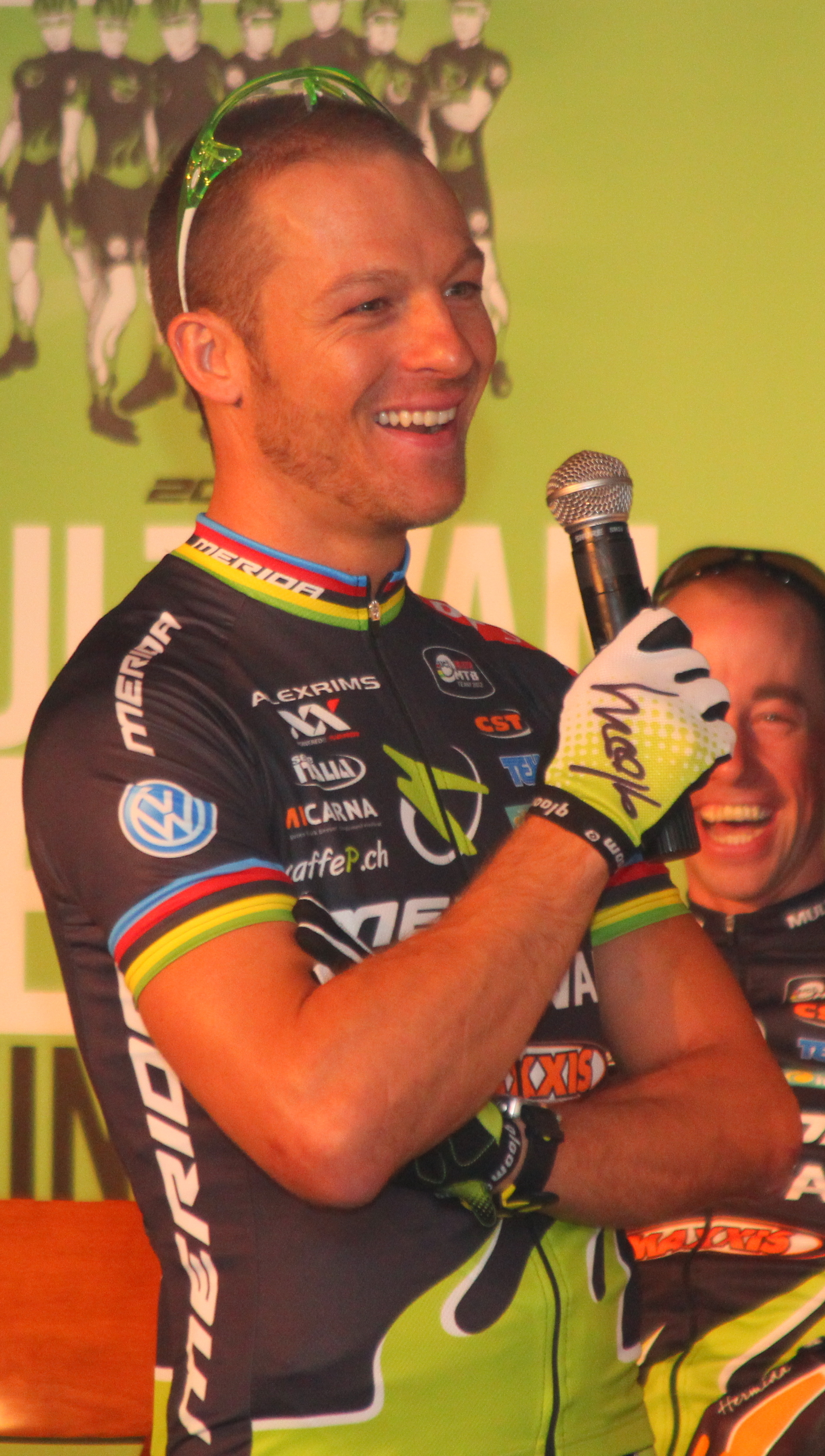
- Näf in 2012

Personal information
- Full name: Ralph Näf
- Born: 10 May 1980 (age 46) Birwinken, Switzerland

Cycling career
- Sport: Cycling
- Discipline: Mountain bike racing
- Role: Rider
- Rider type: Cross-country

Major wins
- XC World Cup 2 individual wins (2005, 2008)
Medal record
Representing Switzerland
Men's mountain bike racing
World Championships
Gold medal – first place	2006 Oisans	Marathon
Gold medal – first place	2012 Leogang-Saalfelden	Cross-country eliminator
Gold medal – first place	2010 Mont Sainte-Anne	Team relay
Silver medal – second place	2007 Fort William	Cross-country
Bronze medal – third place	2008 Val di Sole	Cross-country
European Championships
Gold medal – first place	2003 Graz	Cross-country
Gold medal – first place	2009 Zoetermeer	Cross-country
Gold medal – first place	2006 Tambre	Marathon
Gold medal – first place	2010 Montebelluna	Marathon
Gold medal – first place	2003 Graz	Team relay
Gold medal – first place	2004 Wałbrzych	Team relay
Gold medal – first place	2006 Lamosano	Team relay
Gold medal – first place	2010 Haifa	Team relay
Silver medal – second place	2014 Sankt Wendel	Cross-country eliminator
Silver medal – second place	2009 Zoetermeer	Team relay
Bronze medal – third place	2004 Wałbrzych	Cross-country
Bronze medal – third place	2006 Lamosano	Cross-country
Bronze medal – third place	2012 Moscow	Cross-country

Ralph Näf (born 10 May 1980) is a retired Swiss cross-country mountain biker. At the 2004 Summer Olympics, he competed in the men's cross-country, finishing in 6th place. At the 2012 Summer Olympics, he competed in the Men's cross-country at Hadleigh Farm, finishing in 18th place.
