= Dual slalom =

Mountain bike racing discipline

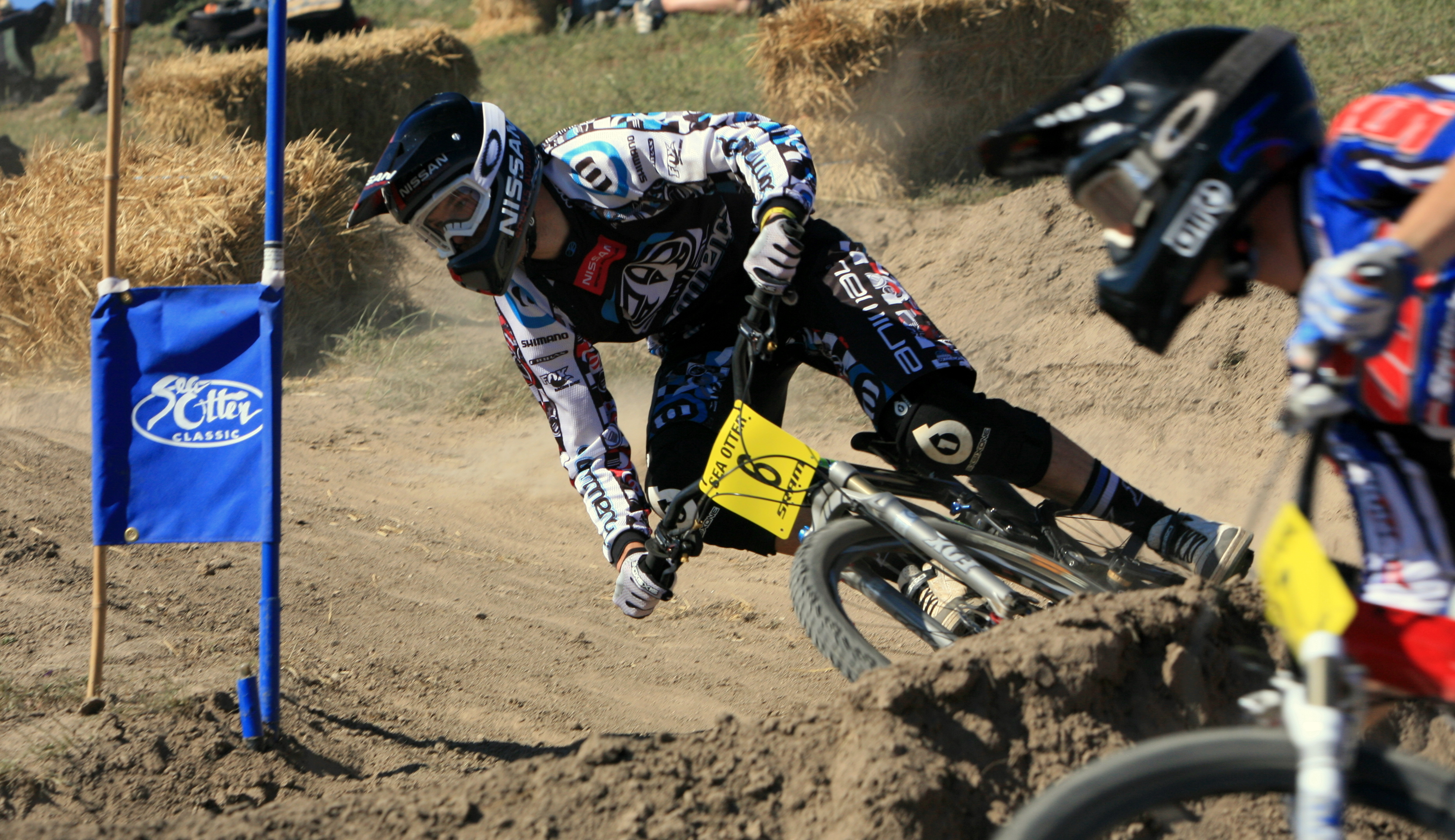
Dan Atherton in Sea Otter

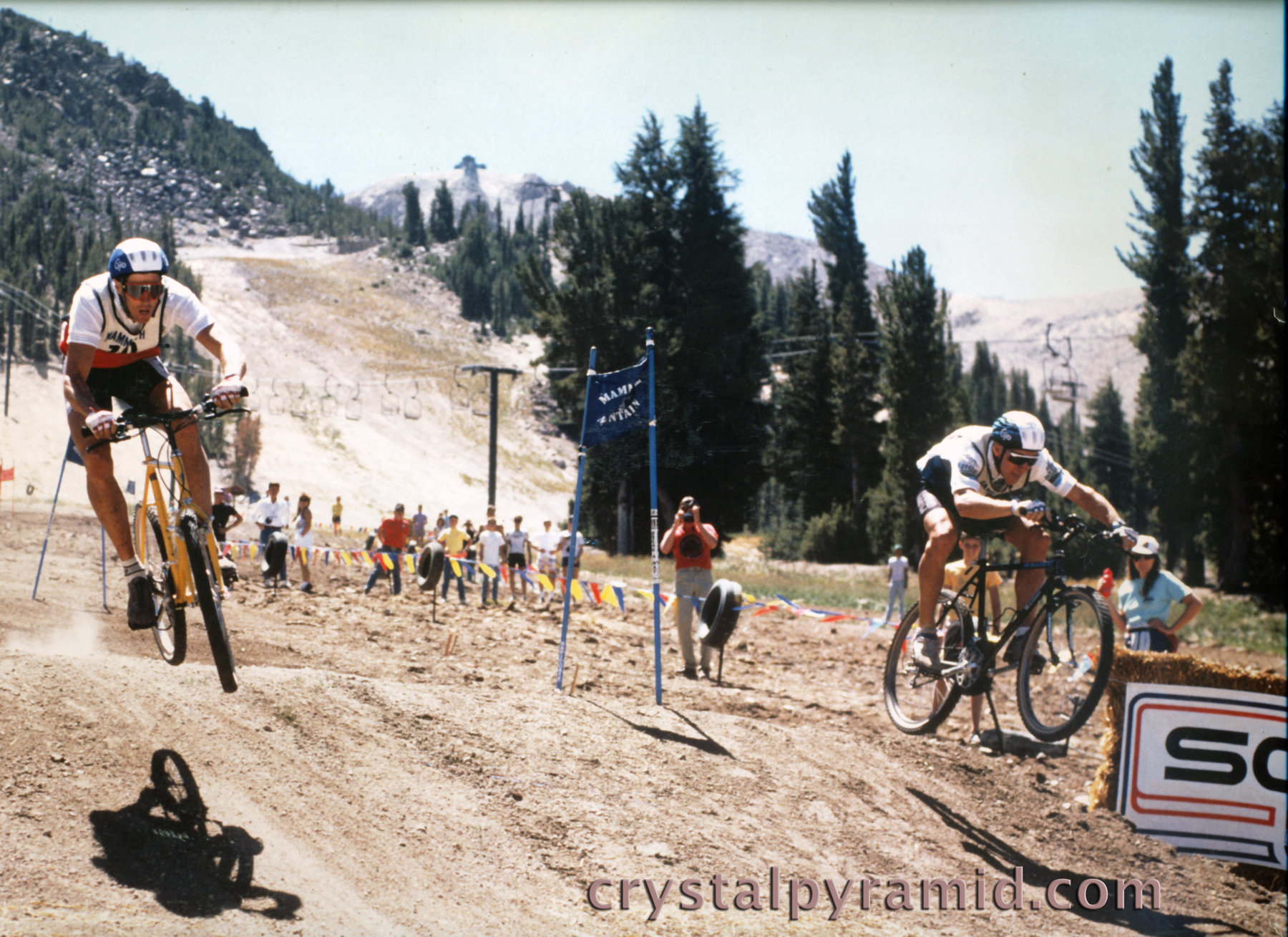
Jimmy Deaton and John Tomac Compete in the Dual Slalom, Mammoth Mountain, 1988

Dual slalom is a mountain bike racing discipline similar to 4X racing.

It consists of two racers racing two almost identical tracks next to each other down a slope. The courses are usually short, one run lasting about 30 seconds. It is filled with tabletop jumps, doubles and bermed turns. Both riders' times are taken, and then they switch tracks for another round, whereafter, the combined times are counted, and the slowest rider is eliminated. The winner moves on to the next round until they have 2 riders left racing in the final.

The first dual slalom race occurred at Mammoth Mountain, California 1987. In the first few heats, the fastest riders were pitted against the slowest, thus eliminating the slowest riders almost immediately. Greg Herbold won the 1987 inaugural Dual Slalom. In 1988, Jimmy Deaton and John Tomac were the last male riders to compete, with Tomac emerging as the winner.
