= Melissa Buhl =

American racing cyclist (born 1982)

Personal information
- Full name: Melissa Buhl
- Nickname: Top Fuel Buhl
- Born: January 25, 1982 (age 44) Chandler, Arizona
- Height: 5 ft 5 in (165 cm)
- Weight: 140 lb (64 kg)

Cycling career
- Sport: Cycling
- Disciplines: Downhill, four-cross, dual slalom
- Role: Rider

Professional teams
- 1997–2000: Rock Shox Devo
- 2001–2012: KHS Factory Racing
Medal record
Representing United States
Women's Mountain bike racing
World Championships
| Gold medal – first place | 2008 Val Di Sole | Four-cross |
| Bronze medal – third place | 2007 Fort William | Four-cross |
| Bronze medal – third place | 2009 Canberra | Four-cross |

Melissa Buhl (born January 25, 1982) is an American former professional downhill and mountain-cross racer who has been racing as pro since 1998. She was the 2005 USAC (USA Cycling) National Pro Downhill Champion and 2002 USAC National Pro Mountain Cross Champion, and 2008 4-X World Champion, NMBS DH Champion, NMBS 4-X Champion. Buhl started racing for KHS Factory Racing in 2001 and retired in 2012.

== Achievements ==
Incomplete list

1998
Junior US National DH Champion
2002
1st USAC National Pro Mountain Cross Championships
2005
1st USAC National Pro Downhill (Pro Women's)
2006
1st NORBA National Mountain Bike Series
4th UCI Mountain Bike World Championships (Elite Women's)

2007
US National Dual Slalom Champion
NMBS Overall Downhill Champion
NMBS Overall Gated Racing Champion
USA Cycling Gravity Racer of the Year

2008
US National Downhill Champion
NMBS Overall Gated Racing Champion
US National Dual Slalom Champion
US National Four Cross Champion
NMBS DS Champion
JKOM Series Champion
UCI 4-X World Champion

2009
US National DH Champion
