= Elisabeth Osl =

Austrian cross-country mountain biker

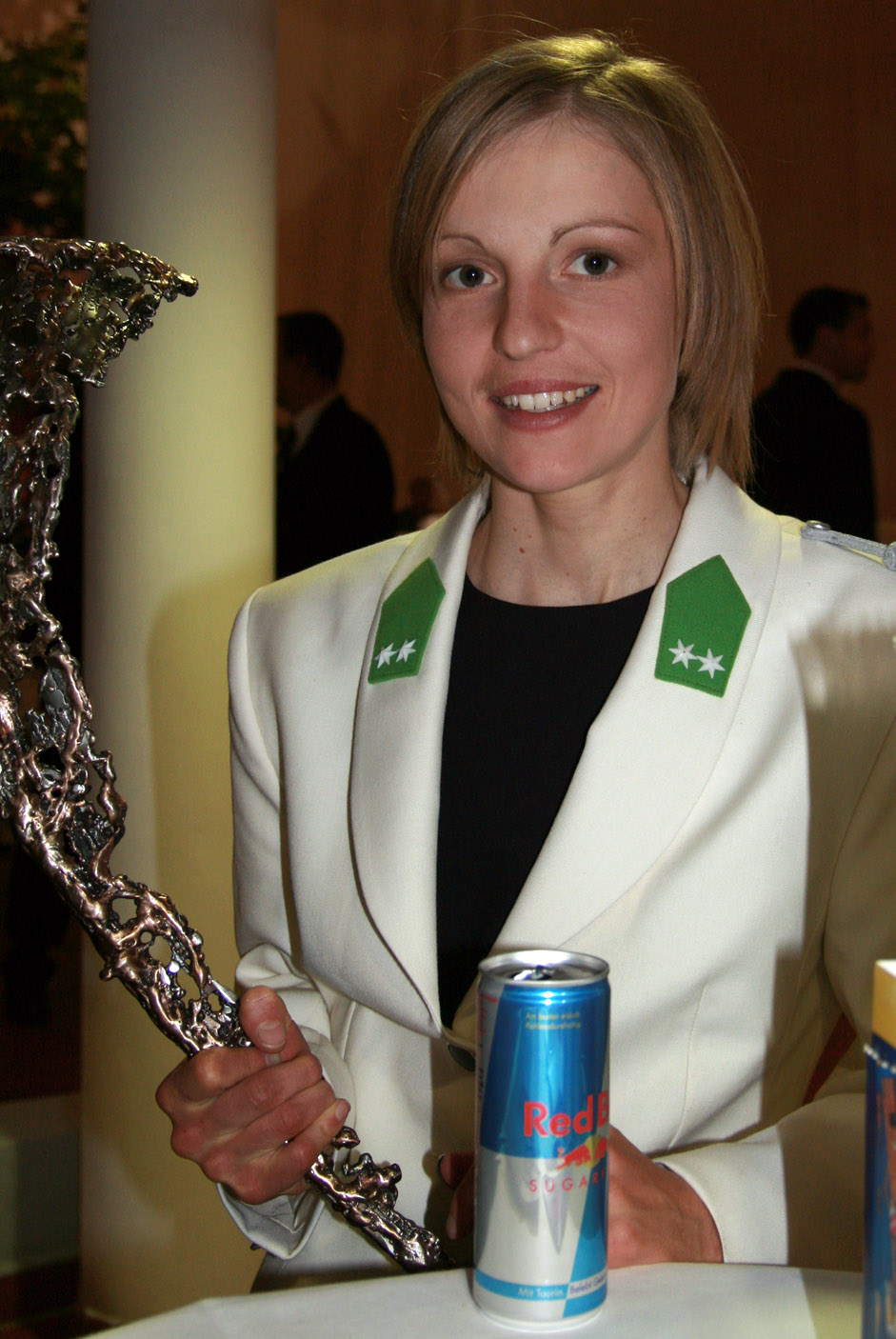
- Osl came third in the 2009 Austrian Sports Personality of the Year

Personal information
- Full name: Elisabeth Osl
- Born: 21 November 1985 (age 40) Kitzbühel, Austria

Cycling career
- Sport: Cycling
- Discipline: Mountain bike racing
- Role: Rider
- Rider type: Cross-country

Elisabeth Osl (born 21 November 1985) is an Austrian cross-country mountain biker. She competed at the 2008 Summer Olympics, she finished in 11th. At the 2012 Summer Olympics, she competed in the Women's cross-country at Hadleigh Farm, finishing in 15th place.
