= Jana Horáková =

Czech professional BMX cyclist

Personal information
- Full name: Jana Horáková
- Born: 4 September 1983 (age 43) Prostějov, Czechoslovakia
- Height: 1.72 m (5 ft 7 1/2 in)
- Weight: 65 kg (143 lb)

Cycling career
- Sport: Cycling
- Current team: Duratec
- Discipline: Bicycle motocross (BMX)
- Role: Rider
- Rider type: Off road

Professional teams
- 2003–2009: Suzuki-RB Team
- 2010–: Duratec
Medal record
Women's BMX racing
Representing Czech Republic
UCI World Championships
Bronze medal – third place	2002 Paulínia	BMX
Bronze medal – third place	2007 Victoria	BMX
Bronze medal – third place	2005 UCI Mountain Bike World Cup	Four-cross

Jana Horáková (born 4 September 1983 in Prostějov) is a Czech professional BMX cyclist. Having started BMX racing at age fifteen, Horakova has claimed numerous Czech national titles, eight European championship titles (a conglomerate of under-12, junior, and elite), and more importantly, two bronze medals in the women's elite category at the UCI World Championships (2002 and 2007). She also represented her nation Czech Republic at the 2008 Summer Olympics, and has been racing professionally for most of her sporting career on the Suzuki-RB Team, before signing an exclusive, three-year sponsorship contract with Duratec in 2010.

Horakova qualified for the Czech squad, as a lone female rider, in women's BMX cycling at the 2008 Summer Olympics in Beijing by receiving an automatic berth from the Czech Cycling Union based on her top-ten performance at the UCI BMX World Rankings. After she surprisingly grabbed an eighth seed on the morning prelims with a time of 38.077, Horakova could not match a stellar ride in her semifinal heat with 16 positioning points and a fifth-place finish, narrowly missing out the top-eight final by a two-point deficit.

In September 2011, Horakova had tested positive for the banned substance clenbuterol while participating in fourcross mountain biking at the World Championships. On 28 June 2012 the Union Cycliste Internationale had officially decided to order Horakova a two-year suspension from the UCI World Championships, and more importantly, from the Olympic Games in London, despite being appealed by the Czech Cycling Union earlier of that year.
