= Sabrina Jonnier =

French downhill mountain biker

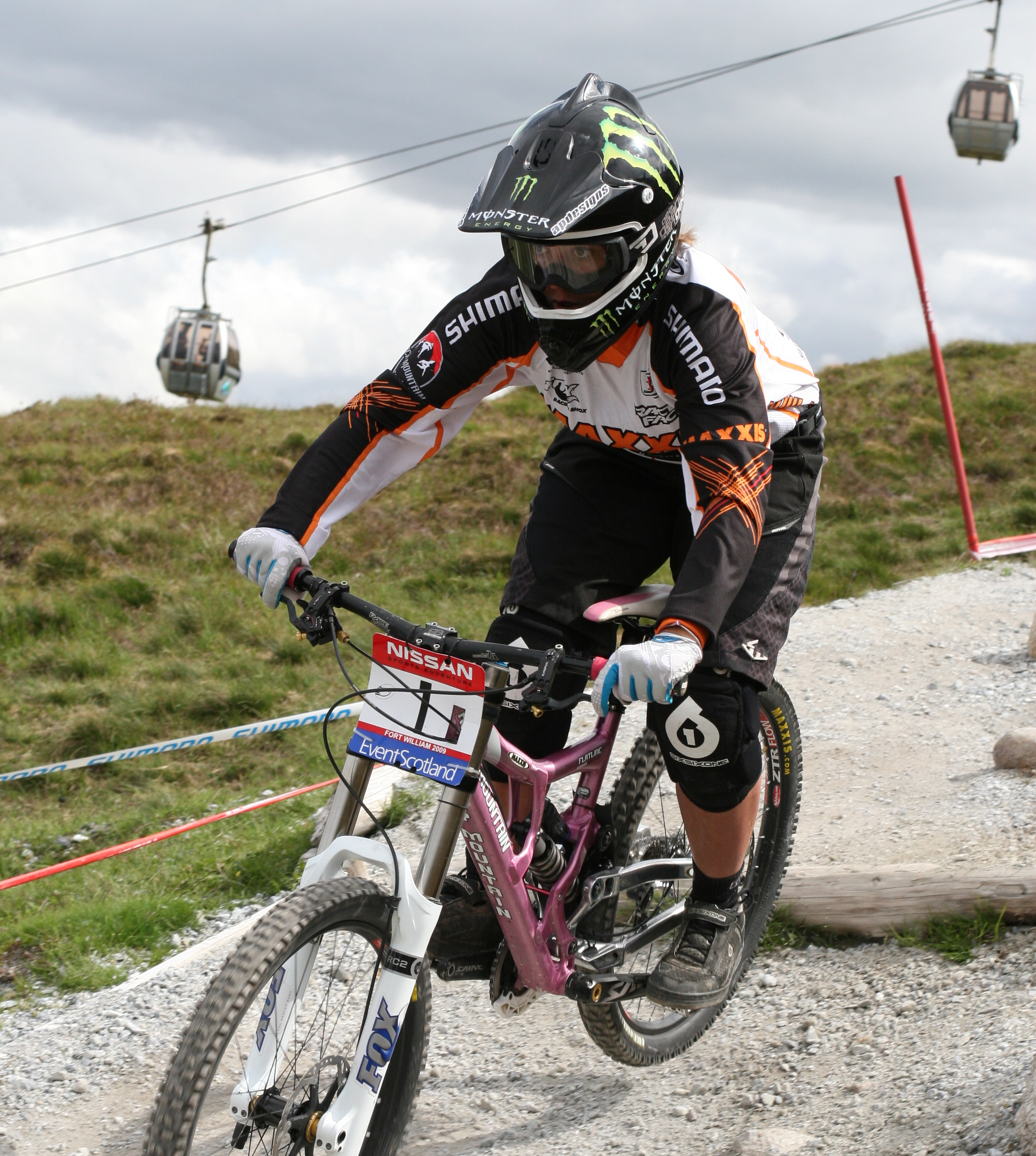
- Sabrina Jonnier in 2009.

Personal information
- Born: 19 August 1981 (age 45) Hyères, France

Cycling career
- Sport: Cycling
- Current team: Retired
- Discipline: Downhill
- Role: Rider
Medal record
Representing France
Women's mountain bike racing
World Championships
Gold medal – first place	2006 Rotorua	Downhill
Gold medal – first place	2007 Fort William	Downhill
Silver medal – second place	2003 Lugano	Downhill
Silver medal – second place	2005 Livigno	Downhill
Silver medal – second place	2008 Val di Sole	Downhill
Silver medal – second place	2010 Mont Sainte-Anne	Downhill
European Championships
Gold medal – first place	2001 Livigno	Dual slalom
Gold medal – first place	2007 Elatochori	Downhill
Gold medal – first place	2008 Caspoggio	Downhill

Sabrina Jonnier (born 19 August 1981) is a French former professional downhill mountain biker. She won the general classification of the UCI Downhill World Cup five times: in 2003, 2005, 2007, 2009 and 2010. She was also the world downhill champion in 2006 and 2007, in addition to four second-place finishes.

She retired in 2012 after the national championships, largely due to a crash sustained while practicing for the World Cup event in Pietermaritzburg, South Africa.
