= Roger Rinderknecht =

Swiss cyclist

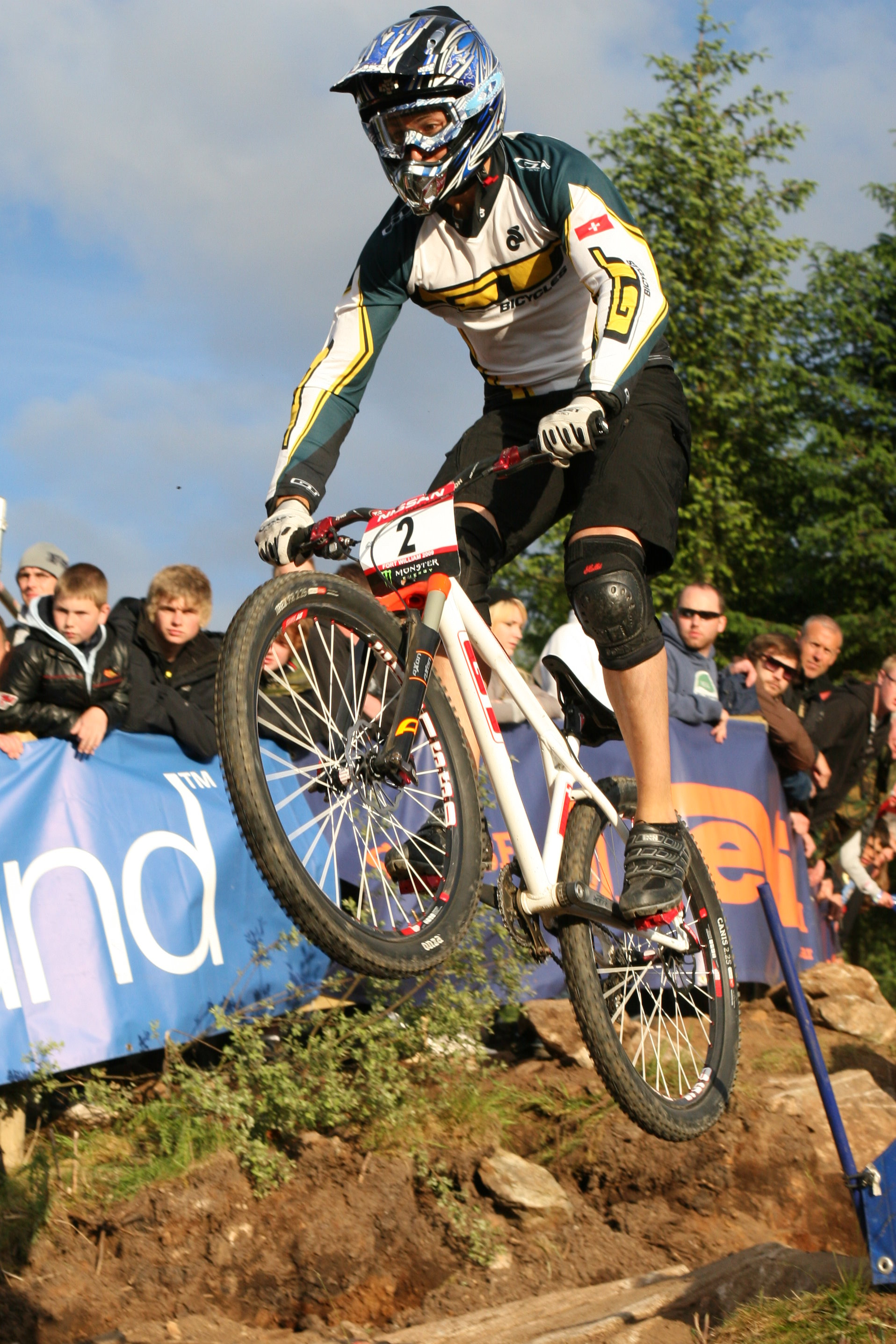
- Rinderknecht at the Fort William round of the 2009 UCI Mountain Bike World Cup

Personal information
- Born: 4 May 1981 (age 45) Winterthur, Switzerland

Cycling career
- Sport: Cycling
- Disciplines: Mountain bike racing and BMX
- Role: Rider
- Rider type: MTB: Four-cross
Medal record
Representing Switzerland
Men's mountain bike racing
World Championships
Gold medal – first place	2012 Leogang-Saalfelden	Four-cross
Silver medal – second place	2006 Rotorua	Four-cross
Silver medal – second place	2008 Val Di Sole	Four-cross
Silver medal – second place	2011 Champéry	Four-cross

Roger Rinderknecht (born 4 May 1981 in Winterthur) is a Swiss racing cyclist who represents Switzerland in BMX and mountain bike racing. He was selected to represent his country at the 2012 Summer Olympics in the men's BMX event, where he reached the semi-finals. He had previously reached the semi-finals at the 2008 Summer Olympics.

Rinderknecht was appointed as a member of the inaugural UCI Athletes' Commission in 2011.
