= Ren Chengyuan =

Chinese cyclist

Ren Chengyuan (Chinese: 任成远; born 20 September 1986 in Jiangsu) is a female Chinese Olympic cyclist, who competed for Team China at the 2008 Summer Olympics.

== Sports career ==
- 2001 Xuzhou Spare-time Sports School;
- 2002 Jiangsu Provincial Mountain Bike Team;
- 2005 National Team
- 2011 Specialized Racing
- 2016 China Jiangsu ZGL MTB Team

== Major performances ==
- 2004 Mountain Bike XC National Championships - 2nd place;
- 2005 Mountain Bike XC National Championships - 1st place;
- 2005 Asian Championships MTB XC - 1st place;
- 2006 Mountain Bike World Championships U23 XC - 1st place;
- 2007 Mountain Bike World Cup XC Round 1 - Houffalize, Belgium - 1st;
- 2007 Mountain Bike World Cup XC Round 2 - Offenburg, Germany - 7th;
- 2007 Mountain Bike World Cup XC Round 3 - Champery, SUI - 14th
- 2007 Mountain Bike World Cup XC Women's Elite Round 4 - Mont Sainte Anne, CAN - 2nd place
- 2007 Mountain Bike World Cup XC Women's Elite Round 5 - St Felicien, CAN - 6th place
- 2007 Mountain Bike World Cup XC Women's Elite Round 6 (Final Round) - Maribor, SLO - 5th place
- 2007 UCI Mountain Bike World Cup XC Women's U23 World Cup overall winner;
- 2007 UCI Mountain Bike World Cup XC Women's ELITE World Cup overall 3rd place, with 918 points. Marie-Helen Premont was 2nd place with 1040 points, and Irina Kalentyeva was the overall winner with 1174 points.;
- 2008 Mountain Bike World Cup XC Round 1 - Houffalize, Belgium - 1st;
- 2008 Mountain Bike World Cup XC Round 2 - Offenburg, Germany - 3rd
- 2008 Olympic Games - MTB XC - 5th place;
- 2009 Mountain Bike World Cup XC Round 2 - Offenburg, Germany - 1st;
- 2009 Mountain Bike World Cup XC Round 3 - Houffalize, Belgium - 3rd;
- 2009 Mountain Bike XC National Championships - 1st place;
- 2009 National Games - 1st women's cycling mountain cross-country;
- 2009 Asian Championships - MTB XC - 1st place Held in Malacca, Malaysia
- 2010 Asian Championships - MTB XC - 1st place. Held in Jecheon City, Korea
- 2011 Mountain Bike World Cup XC Women's Elite Round 1 - Pietermaritzburg, South Africa - 1st place;
- 2011 Mountain Bike World Cup XC Women's Elite Round 2 - Yorkshire, Dalby Forest, UK - 5th place
- 2014 Asian Championships - MTB XC Team Relay - 1st place: (4 Team China members: BIEKEN, Nazaerbieke; REN, Chengyuan; GU, Bingcheng; YIN, Siyuan) Held in Lubuklinggau City, Indonesia
- 2014 Asian Championships - MTB XC Women's Elite - 2nd place.
- 2015 Mountain Bike World Cup XC Women's Elite Round 1 - Nove Mesto, CZE: 24th place
- 2015 Asian Championships - MTB XC Women's Elite - 1st place
- 2016 Asian Championships in Chai Nat, Thailand - MTB XC Women's Elite - 1st place
- 2016 International Kamptal Klassik Trophy in Langenlois, Austria - MTB XC Women's Elite - 2nd place
- 2016 Mountain Bike World Cup XC Women's Elite Round 1 - Cairns, AUS: 25th place
- 2016 Mountain Bike World Cup XC Women's Elite Round 2 - Albstadt, GER: 38th place
- 2016 Mountain Bike World Cup XC Women's Elite Round 3 - La Bresse, FRA: 26th place
