= Fionn Griffiths =

British downhill mountain bike rider

Personal information
- National team: British
- Born: 27 August 1982 (age 43) Shrewsbury, Shropshire

Sport
- Sport: Downhill & 4X Mountain Biking + Motorcycle Racing
- Event(s): Downhill, 4X Mountain Biking + Enduro (motorcycles)

Achievements and titles
- Personal best(s): Two times - Downhill World Cup winner. (Foes Racing) Four times - 4X World Cup Winner. (Norco World Team) She holds a total of 57x UCI World Cup Podiums; European Motorcycle Enduro Champion; Three time World Championship silver medalist; Two time World championship bronze medalist; Five times UK National DH Champion

Fionn Griffiths (born 27 August 1982 in Shrewsbury, Shropshire) is a British downhill mountain bike racer and sports team manager, with an athletic career spanning 18 years. She claimed six World Cup victories across Downhill (DH) and Four-Cross (4X) disciplines, and stood on the UCI World Cup podium 57 times.

In 2001, she founded GR Management, a sports marketing agency. Throughout her career, she owned and managed several professional World Cup teams, including The NORCO World Team, GR Orange, GR INTENSE, and GR Evil. Under her leadership, these teams earned multiple overall team podium finishes in the UCI Elite Team standings. Griffiths also represented a number of elite athletes across various disciplines, many of whom achieved World Championship titles and World Cup victories.

Griffiths is one of the most experienced DH racers in the world, currently ranked second on the UCI World Cup career starts list, which tracks the total number of races she has participated in over her 18-year career.

Griffiths is a six-time UCI World Cup winner and one of the most successful British athletes in downhill mountain biking. Over the course of her career, she earned two bronze and three silver medals at the UCI World Championships, and was crowned UK National Downhill Champion five times.

In addition to her mountain biking achievements, Griffiths also competed for several years on the Great Britain off-road motorcycle team, where she claimed the title of European Enduro Champion.

Her racing career was brought to an early end in 2015, following a crash during the Fort William World Cup, where she sustained a compression fracture of the lower spine. The injury later required spinal fusion surgery.

Following her retirement from competition, Griffiths relocated to Asolo, Italy, where she worked with long-time sponsor Alpinestars, contributing to the design and development of their MX and mountain bike technical product lines.

In 2017, she returned to the UK and joined Husqvarna Motorcycles as National Marketing and Events Coordinator. She has since transitioned into public service and is now serving as a firefighter in the West Midlands.

== History ==
Griffiths first got into mountain biking when she had a car accident and used it to help her recovery from injuries sustained from the crash. She then continued to bike and at a local training day collected information from Mid Shropshire Wheelers club.

Over her career she set up and ran a number of World Cup UCI teams starting with The NORCO World Team, Intense and then KTM.

== Injuries ==
In 2004 Griffiths broke her ankle at the start of the season. In an interview with BBC Wales she talked about the incident: "It was one of the biggest mistakes I've ever made. I'm only now beginning to realize how to mentally put myself back together." She ended up breaking her ankle 7 times in a year and a half after trying to continue her race season despite her injuries. over her career she also sustained other multiple major injuries including, concussions, broken wrists, hip injury, fractured neck, fractured thoracic spine, multiple dislocated shoulders, ribs and fingers and Internal bleeding.
