= Emmeline Ragot =

French bicycle racer

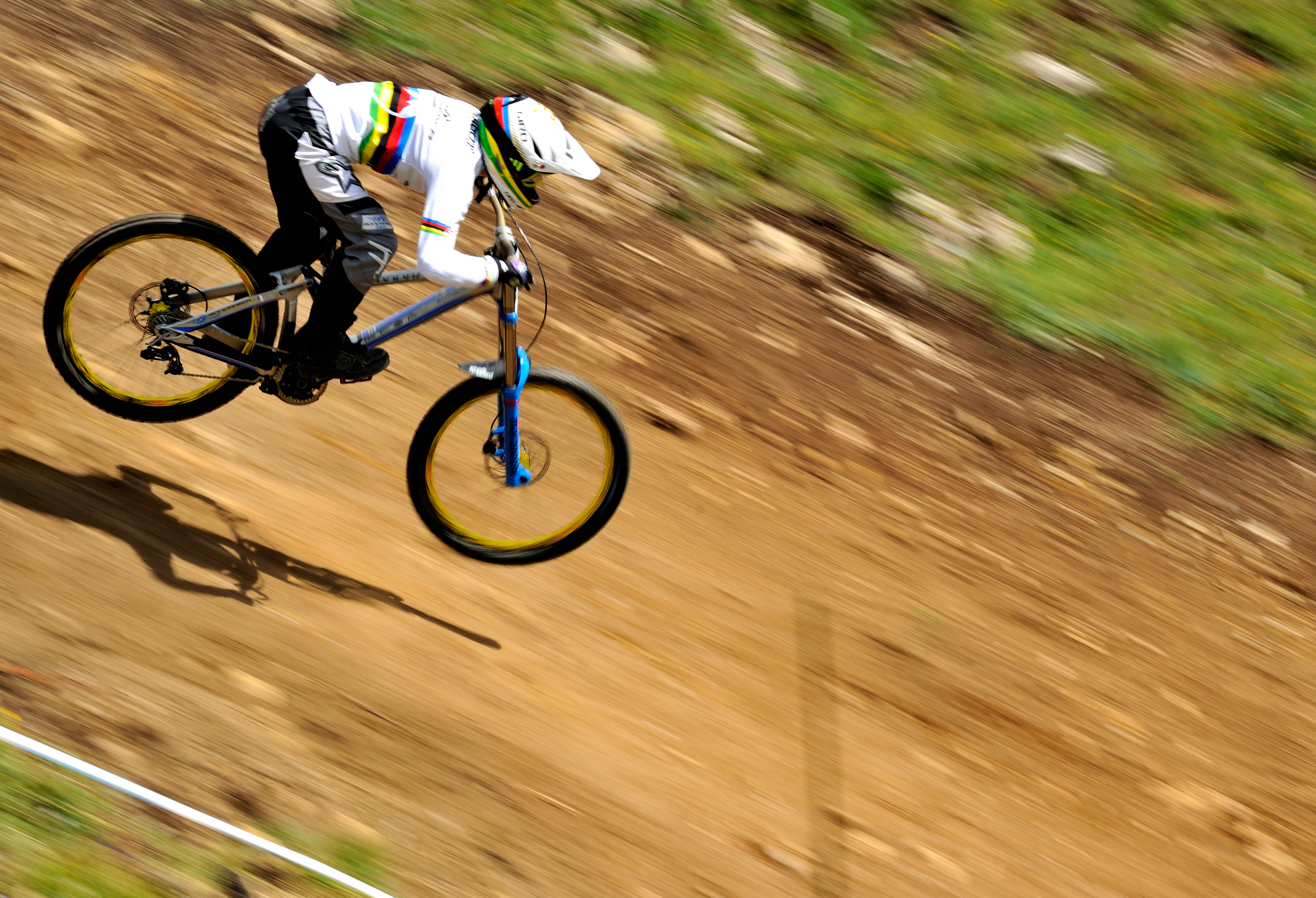
- Emmeline Ragot racing in 2011.

Personal information
- Born: 27 May 1986 (age 40) Angoulême, France

Cycling career
- Sport: Cycling
- Current team: Retired
- Discipline: Downhill
- Role: Rider
Medal record
Representing France
Women's mountain bike racing
World Championships
| Gold medal – first place | 2009 Canberra | Downhill |
| Gold medal – first place | 2011 Champéry | Downhill |
| Silver medal – second place | 2012 Leogang-Saalfelden | Downhill |
| Silver medal – second place | 2013 Pietermaritzburg | Downhill |
| Bronze medal – third place | 2005 Livigno | Downhill |
| Bronze medal – third place | 2008 Val di Sole | Downhill |
| Bronze medal – third place | 2010 Mont Sainte-Anne | Downhill |
European Championships
| Gold medal – first place | 2013 Pamporovo | Four-cross |
| Gold medal – first place | 2013 Pamporovo | Downhill |
| Silver medal – second place | 2009 Ajdovščina | Downhill |

Emmeline Ragot (born 27 May 1986) is a French former professional downhill mountain biker.

She was the world downhill champion in 2009 and 2011, in addition to two second place finishes and three third place finishes. Although she never won the general classification of the UCI Downhill World Cup, she finished second overall three times and third twice. Ragot was also a six time national champion, and won the four-cross and downhill events at the 2013 European Championships.

She announced her retirement from the sport on 22 August 2015 during the UCI World Cup, in order to focus on working as a physiotherapist.
