= Joost Wichman =

Dutch professional mountainbiker (born 1978)

Medal record

Representing Netherlands

Men's mountain bike racing

World Championships
Gold medal – first place	2013 Leogang	Four-cross
Bronze medal – third place	2011 Champery	Four-cross

Joost Wichman on Megavalanche 2014

Joost Wichman (born 19 May 1978, Lichtenvoorde) is a Dutch professional mountainbiker, whose main discipline is four-cross (4X). He is founder and team manager of the Radon Flow Team. He won the UCI World Championship in 2013.

== Biography ==
Joost was 4 when he got his first BMX-bike. After a successful career, resulting in 4 National Pro Titles, 2 victories in the European Championship Rounds and a longtime membership of the National BMX Team, he started his 4X career in 2006. In 2009 he won round 3, 5 and 7 of the UCI Mountain Bike World Cup. In 2010 he won the European Championships for the third time. In 2011 he was 3rd at the World Championships Mountainbike in Champéry. In 2013 he won the 4X UCI World Championship in Leogang, Austria. Just before that event he announced his retirement.

== Sponsors ==
Joost is currently sponsored by Radon Bikes, Magura, Thirty7even, IXS, SRAM Corporation, DT Swiss AG, Carbocage, Continental, SR Suntour Inc., Bikeparkitect, Crankbrothers, Fi'zi:k.
