= Marie-Hélène Prémont =

Canadian mountain bike racer

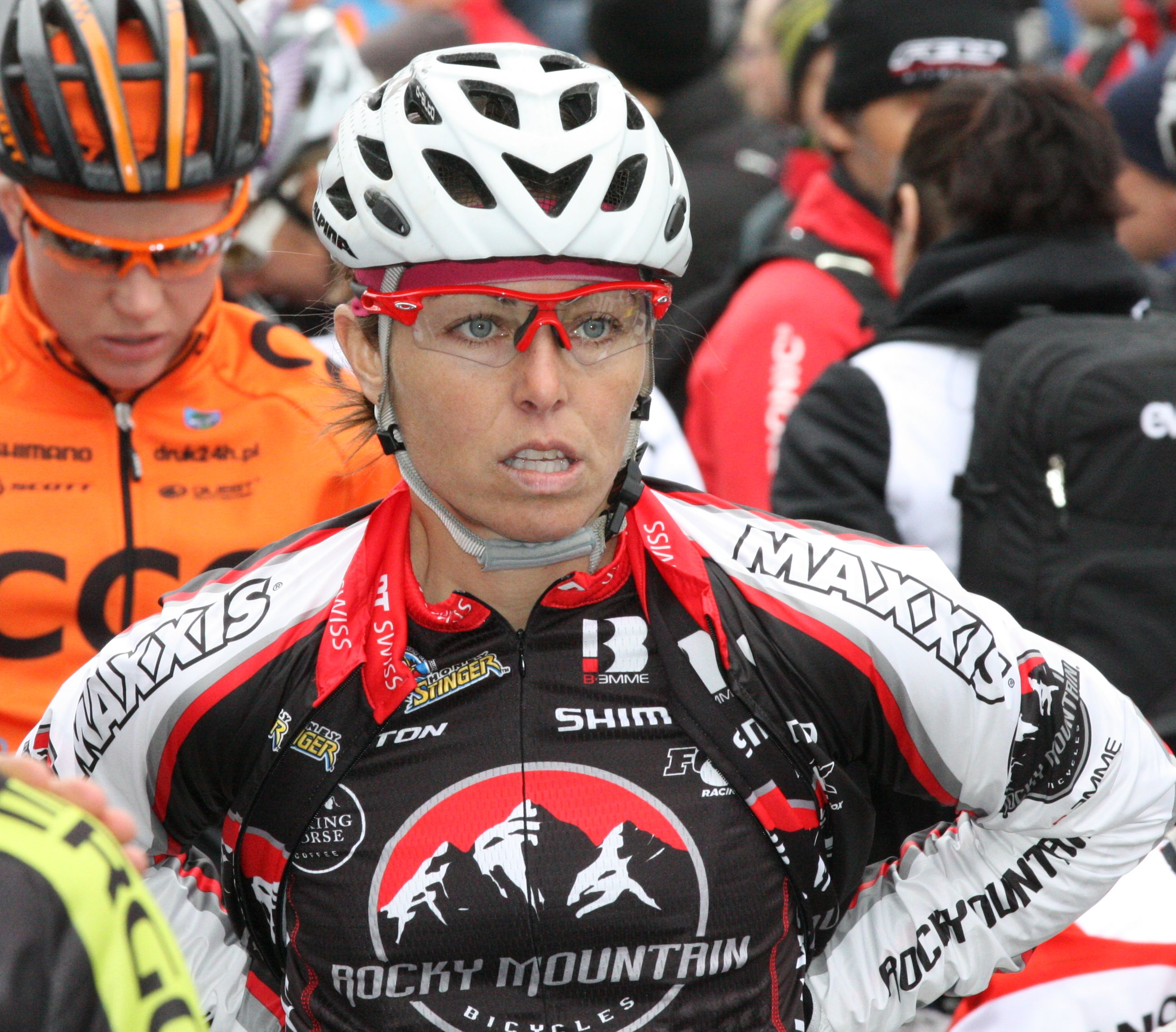

Personal information
- Full name: Marie-Hélène Prémont
- Born: October 24, 1977 (age 48) Quebec City, Quebec, Canada

Cycling career
- Sport: Cycling
- Discipline: Mountain bike racing
- Role: Rider
- Rider type: Cross-country
Medal record
Representing Canada
Women's mountain bike racing
Olympic Games
Silver medal – second place	2004 Athens	Mountain Bike
World Championships
Bronze medal – third place	2006 Rotorua	Cross-country
Commonwealth Games
Gold medal – first place	2006 Melbourne	Mountain Bike

Marie-Hélène Prémont (born October 24, 1977) is a Canadian cross-country mountain biker. She is a 6-time Canadian Champion, represented Canada twice at the Olympics (2004, winning a silver medal, and 2008), a Commonwealth Games gold medalist, and from 2004 to 2008 was a regular medal winner on the UCI Mountain Bike World Cup cross country circuit.

== Career ==
Born in Quebec City, Quebec, Prémont rode for Oryx/Procycle from 1999–2004, and Mont-Velo/Liken. From June 2004 through 2008, and in 2012 she rode for the Rocky Mountain Bikes race team. For the 2009-2011 seasons, she rode for the Maxxis-Rocky Mountain Team. She has been a member of the Canadian National team since 2000.

She has won the Canadian National Elite Women's Championship in 2003, 2004, 2005, 2006, 2007, and 2008.

She won a bronze in the 2003 World Cup circuit in Kaprun, Austria. At the 2004 Summer Olympics, she won a silver medal. She won three silver medals in the 2004 World Cup Circuit in Mont-Sainte-Anne, Quebec, Fort William, Scotland and Livigno, Italy. She won two gold medals in the 2005 World Cup circuit in Spa Francorchamps, Belgium and Mont-Sainte-Anne, Quebec. She won two gold medals in the 2006 World Cup circuit at Mont-Sainte-Anne, Quebec and Schladming, Austria, and a bronze medal in the 2006 World Championships in Rotorua, New Zealand. At the 2006 Commonwealth Games in Melbourne, she won the gold medal. She won 3 silver medals in the 2007 World Cup season at Offenburg, Germany, St. Felicien, Quebec, and Maribor, Slovenia, and finished the 2007 World Cup season in 2nd place overall.

She had her best season ever in 2008 with two gold medals at Fort William and Mont-Sainte-Anne, three silver and three bronze medals and claiming first place overall after eight of the nine races of the 2008 WC season. She was the only woman to win a medal in every World Cup race she entered. At the 2008 Summer Olympics, she was forced to retire from the race due to hyperventilation.

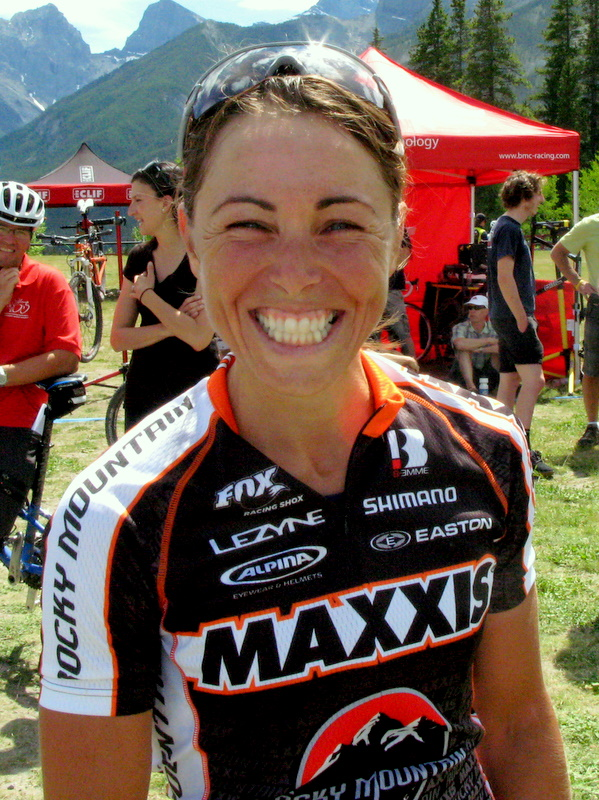
Marie-Hélène Prémont, representing the Maxxis-Rocky Mountain Team in 2009, after finishing second at the Canadian National MTB Championships in Canmore, Alberta

She decided to postpone retirement and race again in 2009. By Madrid, she was back to her usual pace, finishing second just 4 seconds back after swapping the lead with Marga Fullana throughout the race. At Mont-Sainte-Anne in the 5th race of 2009, Marie was the victim of a flat and a fork lockout problem that resulted in a 10th-place finish, and a 13th place in XCO#6 at Bromont after some breathing difficulties limited her climbing ability. Marie finished on the podium again in 5th at the final 2009 World Cup Race in Schladming, finishing the World Cup season in 6th place overall.

After a battery of breathing tests in early August 2009, Marie was diagnosed with exercise induced asthma, first occurring at the Beijing Olympics in 2008 (likely ozone induced since the onset was sudden), and continuing to be a problem through most of the 2009 season. She now has a therapeutic use exception for the use of a Ventolin inhaler in competition.

2010 was a season that combined good fitness and performance with bad luck. There were podium finishes with a 4th at Offenburg and a silver medal in a tightly contested battle at Windham, NY.

At an April 2011 Rocky Mountain Bicycles press conference in Quebec City, Marie-Hélène announced that she would continue to compete on the World Cup circuit through the 2012 season with a goal of competing at the 2012 London Olympic Games.

2011 saw three podium finishes, in Offenburg, Mont-Sainte-Anne and Windham.

She did not compete in the 2012 Olympics.

On 27 February 2013, she announced that she would be taking a sabbatical from mountain bike racing as she was pregnant with her first child.

She returned to competitive racing in 2014 for two races, the Canada Cup, taking Bronze, and the World Cup in August.

On 5 August 2016, it was announced that Premont will be inducted into The Canadian Cycling Hall of Fame.

She formally announced her retirement from competition on 16 October 2016.

== Personal life ==
She lives in Château-Richer, QC.

The 55 km Véloroute Marie-Hélène-Prémont bike trail between Boischatel and Saint-Ferréol-les-Neiges is named for Prémont.

== Major achievements ==
2000

- 59th in World Cup MTB XCO#1, Napa Valley, CA
- 33rd in World Cup MTB XCO#2, Mazatlan, Mexico
- 9th in Canada Cup MTB XC#1, Hardwood Hills, ON
- 5th in Canada Cup MTB XC#2, Mont-Tremblant, QC
- 33rd in World Championships, Sierra Nevada, Spain
- 21st in World Cup MTB XCO#6, Mont Sainte-Anne, QC
- 16th in World Cup MTB XCO#7, Canmore, AB
- 5th in National Championships MTB, Camp Fortune, QC
- 1st in Women's, Raid Pierre Harvey, MTB Marathon, QC
- 1st in Pan American Championships, MTB, Puerto Rico
- 4th in Canada Cup MTB XC#5, Silverstar, BC

2001

- 23rd in World Cup MTB XCO#1, Napa Valley, CA
- 1st in Camp Fortune/Quebec Cup #3, Camp Fortune, QC
- 2nd in Canada Cup MTB XC#1, Hardwood Hills, ON
- 2nd in Canada Cup MTB XC#2, Mont-Tremblant, QC
- 13th in World Cup MTB XCO#4, Grouse Mountain, BC
- 1st in Canada Cup MTB XC#3, Fernie, BC
- 2nd in Canada Cup MTB XC#4, Calgary, AB
- 5th in National Championships MTB, Kamloops, BC
- DNF in Canada Cup MTB XC#5, Sun Peaks, BC
- 15th in World Cup MTB XCO#8, Mont Sainte-Anne, QC
- 1st in Quebec Cup, MTB XC, Bromont, QC
- 1st in Pan American Championships, MTB, Brazil

2002

- 29th in World Cup MTB XCO#1, Madrid, Spain
- 16th in World Cup MTB XCO#2, Houffalize, Belgium
- 1st in Canada Cup MTB XC#2, Hardwood Hills, ON
- 5th in Canada Cup MTB XC#3, Mont-Tremblant, QC
- 2nd in National Championships MTB, Kamloops, BC
- 7th in World Cup MTB XCO#3, Mont Sainte-Anne, QC
- DNF World Cup MTB XCO#4, Grouse Mountain, BC
- 4th in Commonwealth Games MTB, Manchester, UK
- 16th in World Championships MTB, Kaprun, Austria
- 9th in World Cup MTB XCO#5, Les Gets, France
- 3rd in Canadian Championship Cyclo-Cross, Elite Women, St. Augustin, QC

2003

- 1st in Canada Cup MTB XC#1, Bromont, QC
- 22nd in World Cup MTB XCO#1, St. Wendel, Germany
- 9th in World Cup MTB XCO#2, Fort William, Scotland
- 1st in Canada Cup MTB XC#3, Mont-Tremblant, QC
- 5th in World Cup MTB XCO#3, Mont Sainte-Anne, QC
- n/a in World Cup MTB XCO#4 Telluride, CO, (event cancelled)
- 4th in World Cup MTB XCO#5, Grouse Mountain, BC
- 1st in National Championship, MTB, Whistler, BC
- 5th in World Championships MTB, Lugano, Switzerland
- 3rd in World Cup MTB XCO#6, Kaprun, Austria
- 4th in World Cup series overall, Elite Women MTB

2004

- 10th in World Cup MTB XCO#1, Madrid, Spain
- 6th in World Cup MTB XCO#2, Houffalize, Belgium
- 2nd in World Cup MTB XCO#3, Fort William, Scotland
- no entry in World Cup MTB XCO#4, Schladming, Austria
- 2nd in World Cup MTB XCO#5, Mont Sainte-Anne, QC
- 1st in National Championship MTB, Mont Sainte-Anne, QC
- 4th in World Cup MTB XCO#6, Calgary, Alberta
- 2nd in Olympic Games, MTB, Athens, Greece
- 4th in World Championships MTB, Les Gets, France
- 2nd in World Cup MTB XCO#7, Livigno, Italy
- 2nd in World Cup series overall, Elite Women MTB

2005

- 1st in World Cup MTB XCO#1, Spa-Francorchamps, Belgium
- 1st in Canada Cup MTB XC#1, Bromont, QC
- 2nd in World Cup MTB XCO#2, Madrid, Spain
- 4th in World Cup MTB XCO#3, Houffalize, Belgium
- 3rd in World Cup MTB XCO#4, Willingen, Germany
- 1st in National Championship, MTB, Mont Sainte-Anne, QC
- 1st in World Cup MTB XCO#5, Mont Sainte-Anne, QC
- no entry in World Cup MTB XCO#6, Santa Catarina, Brazil
- 2nd in World Cup MTB XCO#7, Angel Fire Resort, USA
- 4th in World Championships MTB, Livigno, Italy
- DNF in World Cup MTB XCO#8, Fort William, Scotland (illness)
- 3rd in World Cup series overall, Elite Women MTB

2006

- 4th in World Cup MTB XCO#1, Curaçao
- 1st in Commonwealth Games, MTB, Melbourne, Australia
- 10th in World Cup MTB XCO#2, Madrid, Spain
- 3rd in World Cup MTB XCO#3, Spa-Francorchamps, Belgium
- 2nd in World Cup MTB XCO#4, Fort William, Scotland
- 1st in Canada Cup MTB XC#3, Hardwood Hills, ON
- 1st in World Cup MTB XCO#5, Mont Sainte-Anne, QC
- 1st in Canada Cup MTB XC#4, Whistler, BC
- 1st in National Championship, MTB, Sun Peaks Resort, BC
- 3rd in World Championship, MTB, XC Elite, Rotorua, New Zealand
- 1st in World Cup MTB XCO#6, Schladming, Austria
- 2nd in World Cup series overall, Elite Women MTB

2007

- 6th in World Cup MTB XCO#1, Houffalize, Belgium
- 1st in Canada Cup MTB XC#1, Baie-Saint-Paul, QC
- 1st in Canada Cup MTB XC#2, Bromont, QC
- 2nd in World Cup MTB XCO#2, Offenburg, Germany
- 3rd in World Cup MTB XCO#3, Champery, Switzerland
- 4th in World Cup MTB XCO#4, Mont Sainte-Anne, QC
- 2nd in World Cup MTB XCO#5, Saint-Félicien, QC
- 1st in National Championship, MTB, Mt. Washington, BC
- 4th in World Championships MTB, Fort William, Scotland
- 2nd in World Cup MTB XCO#6, Maribor, Slovenia
- 2nd in World Cup series overall, Elite Women MTB

2008

- 3rd in World Cup MTB XCO#1, Houffalize, Belgium
- 2nd in World Cup MTB XCO#2, Offenburg, Germany
- 2nd in World Cup MTB XCO#3, Madrid, Spain
- 3rd in World Cup MTB XCO#4, Vallnord, Andorra
- 1st in World Cup MTB XCO#5, Fort William, Scotland
- 4th in World Championships MTB, Val di Sole, Italy
- 1st in National Championship, MTB, Mont Sainte-Anne, QC
- 1st in World Cup MTB XCO#6, Mont Sainte-Anne, QC
- 2nd in World Cup MTB XCO#7, Bromont, QC
- DNF in Olympic Games, MTB, Beijing, China (asthma)
- no entry in World Cup MTB XCO#8, Canberra, Australia
- 3rd in World Cup MTB XCO#9, Schladming, Austria
- 1st in World Cup series overall, Elite Women MTB

2009

- no entry in World Cup MTB XCO#1, Pietermaritzburg, RSA
- 14th in World Cup MTB XCO#2, Offenburg, Germany
- 6th in World Cup MTB XCO#3, Houffalize, Belgium
- 2nd in World Cup MTB XCO#4, Madrid, Spain
- 2nd in National Championship, MTB, Saint-Félicien, QC
- 10th in World Cup MTB XCO#5, Mont Sainte-Anne, QC
- 13th in World Cup MTB XCO#6, Bromont, QC
- 12th in World Championships MTB, Canberra, Australia
- 11th in World Cup MTB XCO#7, Champery, Switzerland
- 5th in World Cup MTB XCO#8, Schladming, Austria
- 6th in World Cup series overall, Elite Women MTB

2010

- 8th in World Cup MTB XCO#1, Dalby Forest, Yorkshire, UK
- DNF in World Cup MTB XCO#2, Houffalize, Belgium (mechanical)
- 4th in World Cup MTB XCO#3, Offenburg, Germany
- 13th in World Cup MTB XCO#4, Champery, Switzerland
- 8th in World Cup MTB XCO#5, Val di Sole, Italy
- 2nd in World Cup MTB XCO#6, Windham, NY
- 8th in World Cup series overall, Elite Women MTB
- 9th in World Championships MTB, Mont Sainte-Anne, QC

2011

- 9th in World Cup MTB XCO#1, Pietermaritzburg, RSA
- 11th in World Cup MTB XCO#2, Dalby Forest, Yorkshire, UK
- 4th in World Cup MTB XCO#3, Offenburg, Germany
- 5th in World Cup MTB XCO#4, Mont Sainte-Anne, QC
- 4th in World Cup MTB XCO#5, Windham, NY
- 2nd in National Championship, MTB, Canmore, AB
- 9th in World Cup MTB XCO#6, Nove Mesto Na Morave, CR
- 11th in World Cup MTB XCO#7, Val di Sole, Italy
- 4th in World Cup series overall, Elite Women MTB
- 9th in World Championships MTB, Champery, Switzerland

2012

- 21st in World Cup MTB XCO#1, Pietermaritzburg, RSA
- 14th in World Cup MTB XCO#2, Houffalize, Belgium
- 9th in World Cup MTB XCO#3, Nove Mesto Na Morave, CR
- 21st in World Cup MTB XCO#4, La Bresse, France
- 2nd in National Championship, Saint-Félicien, QC
- 3rd in World Cup MTB XCO#5, Mont Sainte-Anne, QC
- 4th in World Cup MTB XCO#6, Windham, NY
- 14th in World Cup MTB XCO#7, Val D'Isère, France
- 8th in World Cup series overall, Elite Women MTB
- 38th in World Championships MTB, Saalfelden, Austria
