= Michal Prokop =

Czech biker and Olympic athlete (born 1981)

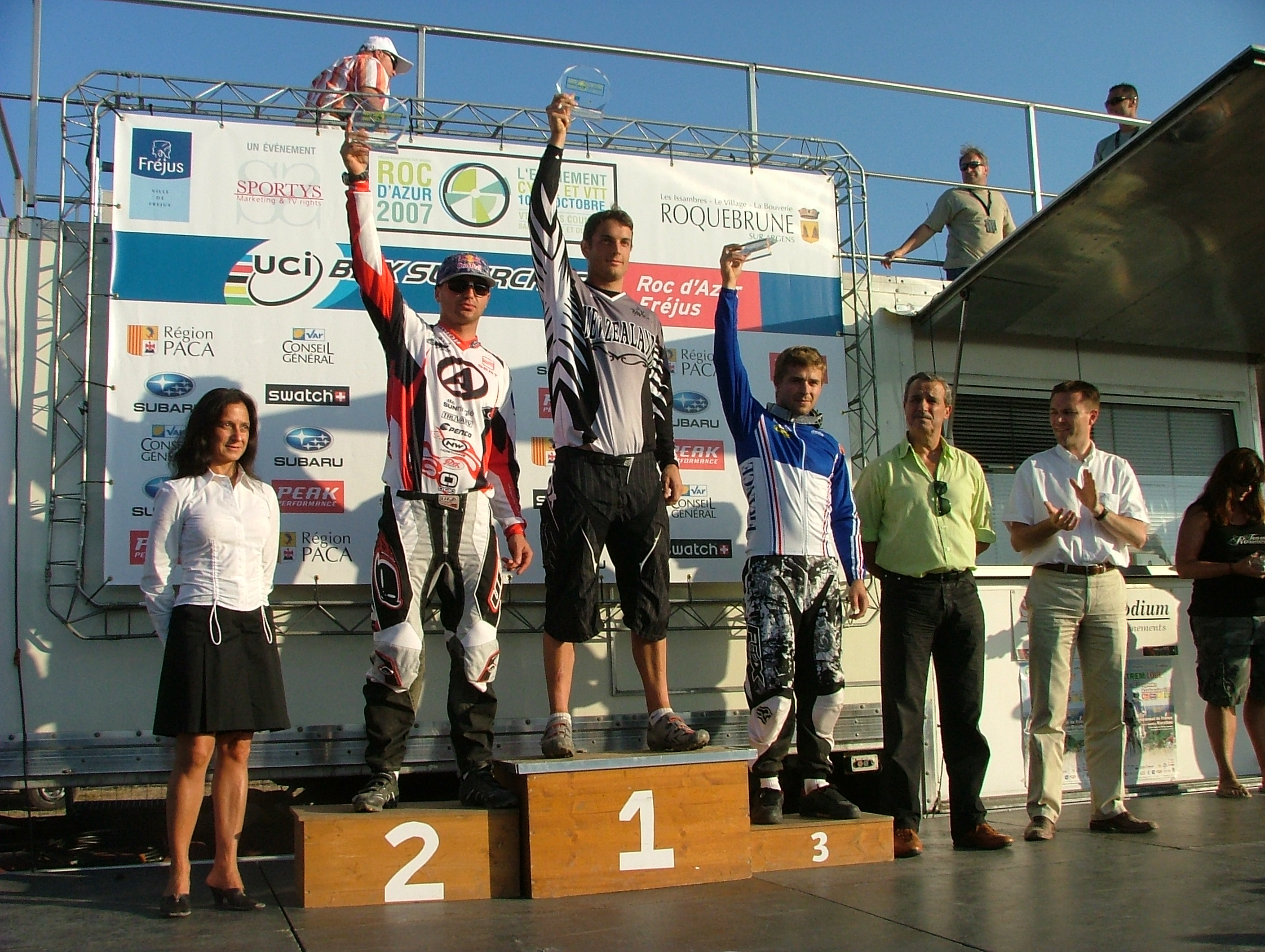
- Prokop (left) at the 2007 Supercross World Cup

Personal information
- Full name: Michal Prokop
- Born: 1 April 1981 (age 45) Prague, Czechoslovakia
- Height: 1.80 m (5 ft 11 in)
- Weight: 83 kg (183 lb)

Cycling career
- Sport: Cycling
- Current team: Specialized
- Discipline: Bicycle motocross (BMX)
- Role: Rider
- Rider type: Fourcross, Enduro

Professional teams
- 2000–2001: Specialized 69
- 2002: Be One
- 2003–2009: Author
- 2010: Author Gang
- 2011–: Specialized
Medal record
Men's BMX racing
Representing Czech Republic
World Cup
Silver medal – second place	2006	BMX racing
Bronze medal – third place	2003	BMX racing
Bronze medal – third place	2004	BMX racing

Michal Prokop (born 1 April 1981 in Prague) is a Czech professional BMX and Mountain Bike Four-cross rider. Started his sporting career at the age of five, Prokop has claimed two World Cup circuit gold medals, and three World Championship jerseys (2003, 2004, and 2011) in the men's elite category, emerging him as one of the most successful fourcross riders in the sport's brief history.

In BMX racing, Prokop has been named an eight-time Czech champion, and collected three gold medals to his career resume at the European Championships. Moreover, he mounted numerous top-three finishes at the UCI BMX World Championships, including his men's cruiser bronze medal in 2002. Prokop also represented his nation Czech Republic at the 2008 Summer Olympics, and more recently, earned his only prestigious title in the men's elite category at the 2012 Red Bull Pump Riders tournament in his home turf Prague. Because of his ample successes in both BMX and fourcross racing, Prokop has been named the "King of the Czech Cycling" by the nation's governing sport union in 2006. Since he turned himself professional in 1995, Prokop currently races for the Specialized BMX and Fourcross Racing Team.

Prokop qualified for the Czech squad, as the nation's sole male rider, in men's BMX cycling at the 2008 Summer Olympics in Beijing by receiving an automatic berth from the Union Cycliste Internationale (UCI) based on his top-ten performance from the BMX World Rankings. After he grabbed a twentieth seed on the morning prelims with a time of 36.689, Prokop scored a total of 18 placing points to take the sixth spot in his quarterfinal heat, thus eliminating him from the tournament.
