= Jared Graves =

Australian cyclist (born 1982)

Personal information
- Born: 16 December 1982 (age 43) Toowoomba, Queensland, Australia
- Height: 1.78 m (5 ft 10 in)
- Weight: 79 kg (174 lb)

Cycling career
- Sport: Cycling
- Current team: Yeti Cycles
- Disciplines: Mountain bike (Enduro, Downhill and 4X) BMX

Professional teams
- 2002: Orange/Madcatz
- 2003: Ironhorse/Madcatz
- 2004–2015: Yeti/Fox Racing Shox Factory team
- 2016–2019: Specialized Factory Racing
- 2020-Current: Yeti/Fox Racing Shox Factory team
Medal record
Men's mountain bike racing
Representing Australia
World Championships
Gold medal – first place	2009 Canberra	Four-cross
Silver medal – second place	2005 Livigno	Four-cross
Silver medal – second place	2010 Mont-Sainte-Anne	Four-cross
Bronze medal – third place	2013 Pietermaritzburg	Downhill

Jared Graves (born 16 December 1982 in Toowoomba, Queensland) is an Australian cyclist who has represented Australia in BMX, four-cross (4X), and downhill mountain biking. In 2006, he finished second in the mountain bike 4x world cup series. In 2008 he finished second in the BMX world cup series and was selected to compete at the 2008 Summer Olympics in Beijing, where he finished sixth.

Graves became 4X World Cup champion in 2009, winning 5 from 8 rounds. On 4 September 2009 he won the UCI 4X World Championship in Canberra, Australia. He won the 2010 UCI 4X World Cup series winning 4 from 6 rounds, then won the silver medal at the 2010 4X World Championships At Mont-Sainte-Anne, Canada after leading the final all the way until making a mistake and being passed on the final corner. Graves also won the 2011 4X World Cup title winning 3 from 5 Rounds. Graves rides for Yeti Cycles. Graves is widely regarded as the best four-cross racer of all time.

In 2013, Graves turned his focus to enduro racing. He opened the season with wins at the Sea Otter Classic in California. He placed highly at most rounds of the 2013 Enduro World Series, including a win at round 5 during the Crankworx festival in Whistler, and finished the season ranked second overall. At the end of the season he returned to downhill racing and placed third at the UCI Mountain Bike & Trials World Championships in Pietermaritzburg, South Africa.

In 2014 Graves won 3 of the 7 rounds of the Enduro World Series (Valloire, France, round 3 – Winter Park, USA, round 5 – and whistler, Canada, round 6) as well as 2 second-place finishes (round 1 and 7), a 5th (round 4) and a 9th (round 2) to become the 2014 Enduro World Champion.

In December 2015 it was announced that Graves would join the Specialized Racing Factory Enduro Team for 2016.
