= Irina Kalentieva =

Russian cyclist (born 1977)

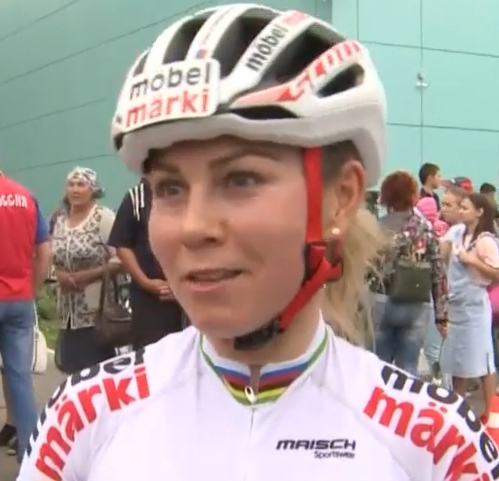
- Kalentieva in 2018

Personal information
- Full name: Irina Nikolayevna Kalentieva
- Born: 10 November 1977 (age 48) Batyrevsky District, Chuvashia, Russian SFSR, Soviet Union

Cycling career
- Sport: Cycling
- Disciplines: Cyclo-cross & MTB
- Role: Rider
Medal record
Representing Russia
Women's Mountain bike racing
Olympic Games
Bronze medal – third place	2008 Beijing	Cross-country
World Championships
Gold medal – first place	2007 Fort William	Cross-country
Gold medal – first place	2009 Canberra	Cross-country
Silver medal – second place	2006 Rotorua	Cross-country
Silver medal – second place	2010 Mont-Sainte-Anne	Cross-country
Silver medal – second place	2014 Lillehammer	Cross-country
Silver medal – second place	2015 Vallnord	Cross-country
Bronze medal – third place	2003 Lugano	Cross-country
Bronze medal – third place	2008 Val di Sole	Cross-country

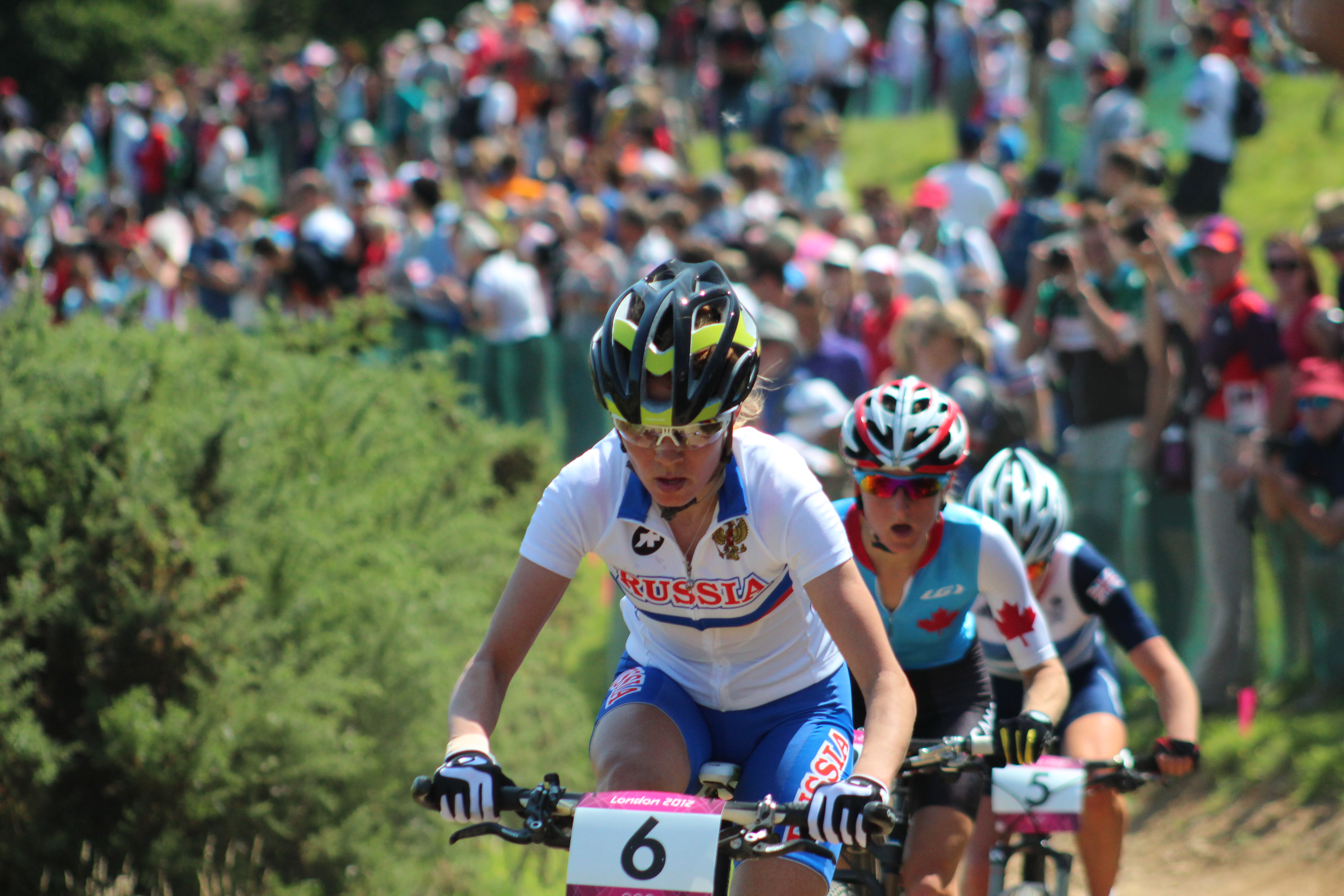
Kalentieva racing in the 2012 Summer Olympics

Irina Nikolayevna Kalentieva (Russian: Ирина Николаевна Калентьева) (née Yagupova, Ягупова; born 10 November 1977 in Batyrevsky District, Chuvashia) is a retired professional cross-country mountain bike racer from Russia. She won the UCI Mountain Bike & Trials World Championships in 2007 and 2009.

She also won a bronze medal at the 2008 Summer Olympics in Beijing and finished fourth at the 2012 Summer Olympics in London and 13th at the 2004 Summer Olympics.
