= Anneke Beerten =

Dutch bicycle racer

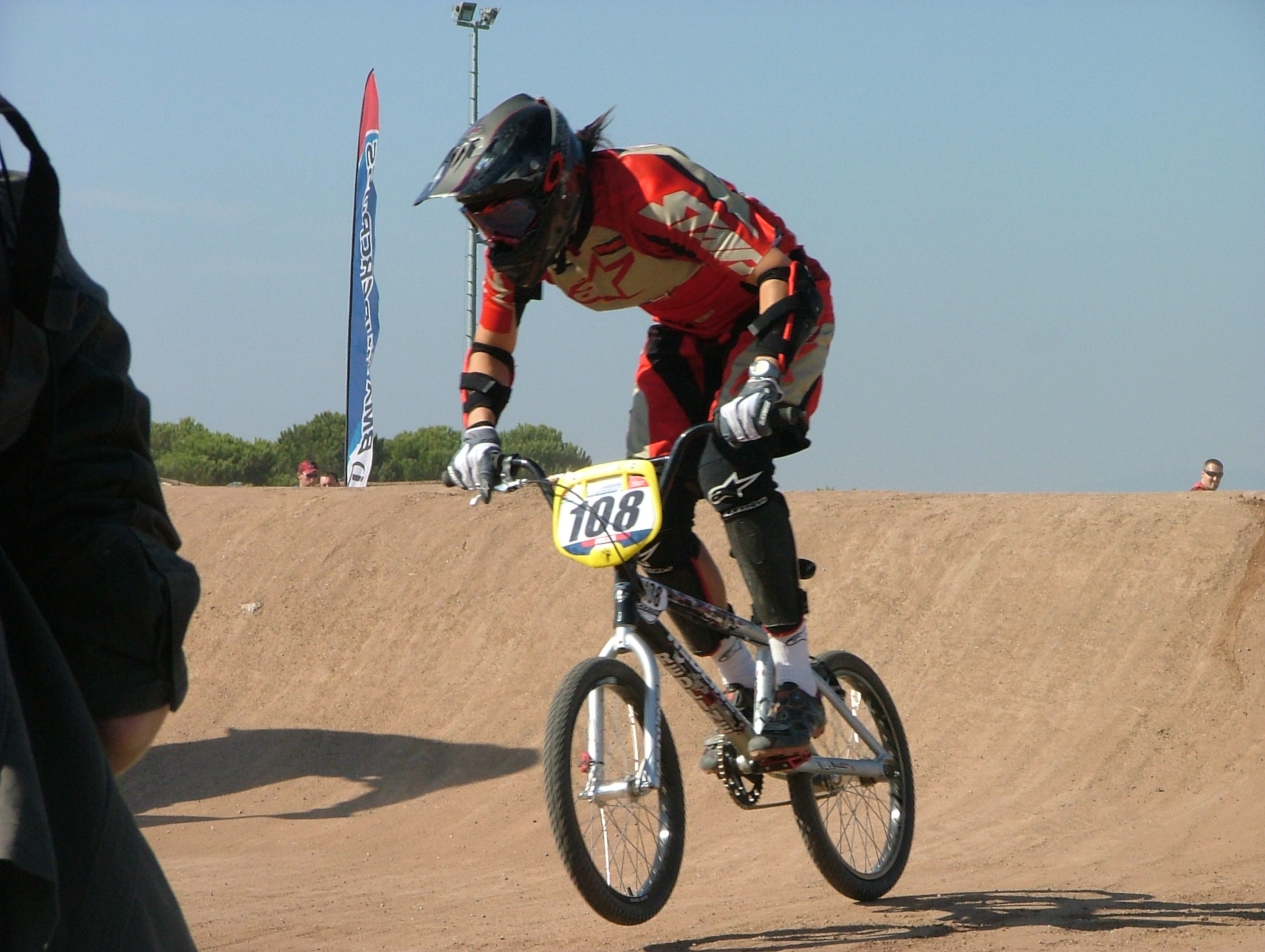
- cycling

Personal information
- Born: 7 July 1982 (age 44) Mariënvelde

Cycling career
- Sport: Cycling
- Disciplines: Four-Cross, Downnhill (DH), BMX Racing

Anneke Beerten (born 7 July 1982) is a Dutch Mountain bike racer and BMX racer. Specializing in Four-cross she was world champion in this discipline in 2011, 2012, 2015, and 2016.

== Life ==
Beerten was born in 1982 in Mariënvelde and she was riding a mountain bike at age four.

She has competed regularly each year as an amateur. She gave up work in retail when she was 22 to become a full time four-cross cyclist. She won the world championships in 2011 and 2012 and she has topped the rankings every year bar one from 2007 to 2011.

== Results ==
UCI Mountain Bike World Championships
Year	Venue	Medal	Competition
2006	Rotorua (New Zealand)	2	Four Cross
2007	Fort William, Highland (United Kingdom)	2	Four Cross
2011	Champéry (Switzerland)	1	Four Cross
2012	Leogang/Saalfelden (Austria)	1	Four Cross
2014	Leogang/Saalfelden (Austria)	2	Four Cross
2015	Val di Sole (Italy)	1	Four Cross
2016	Val di Sole (Italy)	1	Four Cross
