= Four-cross =

Style of mountain bike racing

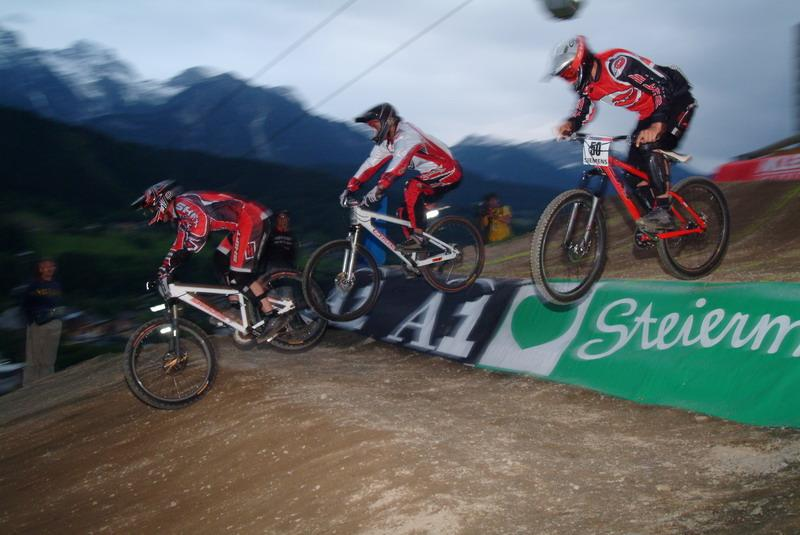
Four-cross race

Four-cross (4X), also called mountain-cross, not to be confused with fourcross, is a relatively new style of mountain bike racing where four bikers race downhill on a prepared, BMX-like track, simply trying to get down first. These bikes are generally either full suspension with 140mm to 160mm of travel, or hardtails, and typically have relatively strong frames. They run a chainguide on front and gears on the back. They have slack head angles, short chainstays and low bottom brackets for good cornering and acceleration. In recent years the tracks raced on have been rougher and less like those used in BMX.

Four-cross was added to the UCI Mountain Bike World Cup and the UCI Mountain Bike & Trials World Championships in 2002, replacing dual slalom. It was removed from the World Cup following the 2011 series. A replacement world series, the 4X Pro Tour, was launched in 2012. The four-cross events were removed from the World Championship after the 2021 edition.

== See also ==
- Mountain biking
- Cross-country cycling
- Freeride (mountain biking)
- Dirt jumping
- Trials
- Downhill
- Snowboard cross
- Ice cross downhill
- Kayak cross
- Ski cross
- Skate cross

== Notable riders ==
- Dan Atherton
- Anneke Beerten
- Melissa Buhl
- Eric Carter
- Cédric Gracia
- Jared Graves
- Mike King
- Jill Kintner
- Brian Lopes
- Michal Prokop
- Roger Rinderknecht
- Joost Wichman
