= List of professional mountain bikers =

A list of Professional Mountain Bikers.

== Visionaries ==
- Keith Bontrager
- Joe Breeze
- Charlie Cunningham
- Gary Fisher
- Charlie Kelly
- Jacquie Phelan
- Tom Ritchey
- John Tomac

== Cross Country ==
- Julien Absalon (Team BMC)
- Henrique Avancini (Cannondale Factory Team)
- Warren Carne (huffy factory team)
- Gunn-Rita Dahle Flesjå
- Susan DeMattei
- Alison Dunlap
- Manuel Fumic (Cannondale Factory Team)
- Juli Furtado
- Sam Gaze (Specialized)
- Sue Haywood
- Gerhard Kerschbaumer (Torpado)
- Maxime Marotte (Cannondale Factory Team)
- Jolanda Neff (Trek Factory)
- Ned Overend (Specialized)
- Paola Pezzo
- Jacquie Phelan
- Nino Schurter (Team Scott)
- Stephane Tempier (Trek Factory)
- David Wiens

== Downhill Racers ==
- Gee Atherton (Atherton bikes)
- Rachel Atherton (Atherton bikes)
- Scott Beaumont
- Loïc Bruni (Specialized S-works)
- Jackson Goldstone (Santa Cruz)
- Eric Carter
- Anne-Caroline Chausson (Turner)
- Missy Giove
- Cedric Gracia (CG Racing Brigade/Santa Cruz)
- Jared Graves (Yeti Cycles)
- Aaron Gwin (YT Industry)
- Tracey Hannah (Hutchinson United)
- Danny Hart (Mondraker)
- Greg Herbold
- Sam Hill (cyclist) (Nukeproof/Chain Reaction Cycles)
- Charlie Kelly (malvern star)
- Chris Kovarik (Nukeproof/Chain Reaction Cycles)
- Matti Lehikoinen (Intense/Chain Reaction Cycles)
- Tara Llanes
- Brian Lopes (Ibis)
- Mark Matthews
- Greg Minnaar (Santa Cruz Syndicate)
- Shaun Palmer (Intense)
- Steve Peat (Santa Cruz Syndicate)
- Jacquie Phelan
- Filip Polc (Evil MS-Racing)
- Tom Ritchey
- Joey Schusler
- John Tomac (Tomac)
- Nicolas Vouilloz (Lapierre/BOS)
- Rob Warner
- Nathan Rennie (Santa Cruz Syndicate)

== Trials Riders ==
- Martyn Ashton
- Kenny Belaey
- Jack Carthy
- Gilles Coustellier
- Vincent Hermance
- Danny MacAskill (Santa Cruz)
- Abel Mustieles
- Hans Rey (GT)

== Dirt Jumpers/ Freeriders ==
- Darren Berrecloth (Canyon)
- Robbie Bourdon (Intense)
- Ryan Howard (Trek)
- Matt Hunter (Specialized)
- Andreu Lacondeguy (Commencal)
- Anthony Messere (Morpheus/Red Bull)
- Sam Reynolds (Polygon Bikes)
- Brett Rheeder (Trek)
- Nicholi Rogatkin (Specialized)
- Brandon Semenuk (Trek)
- Wade Simmons (Rocky Mountain)
- Martin Söderström (Specialized/Red Bull)
- Kurt Sorge (Evil Bikes)
- Cameron Zink (YT/Monster Energy)

== Top mountain bike coaches ==
- Andrew Shandro (Trek)
