= YT Industries =

German mountain bike manufacturer

- Company type: Private
- Industry: Bicycles
- Founded: 2006; 20 years ago
- Headquarters: Hausen, Upper Franconia, Germany
- Key people: Markus Flossmann, Founder & CEO
- Owner: Ardian
- Website: yt-industries.com

YT Industries is a German mountain bike manufacturer. Founded in 2006, the company operates in a direct-to-consumer model. YT also has showrooms at their headquarters in Hausen, Germany, and "YT Mills" in San Clemente, California; Guildford, Surrey, England; and Bentonville, Arkansas. With its origins in dirt jumping and freeriding, YT has expanded its lineup to include all forms of mountain biking and gravel biking.

== History ==
YT Industries traces its roots to a marketing company founded in 2006 by Markus Flossman called Sponsoree Deutschland. Flossman and Stefan Willared built and sold their first bike, a dirt jumper, under the Sponsoree name in 2008, and in 2011 the company was renamed YT (Young Talent) Industries.

YT soon moved into mountain bikes, producing the downhill Tues, Wicked enduro bike, and the park-oriented Norton. In 2014, they launched their first carbon fiber bike, the Capra enduro bike. YT expanded their linup with the all-mountain Jeffsy in 2017, the Decoy e-bike in 2019, the Izzo trail bike in 2020, and the Szepter gravel bike in 2022.

In 2021, private equity firm Ardian acquired a majority stake in the company.

== Model range ==
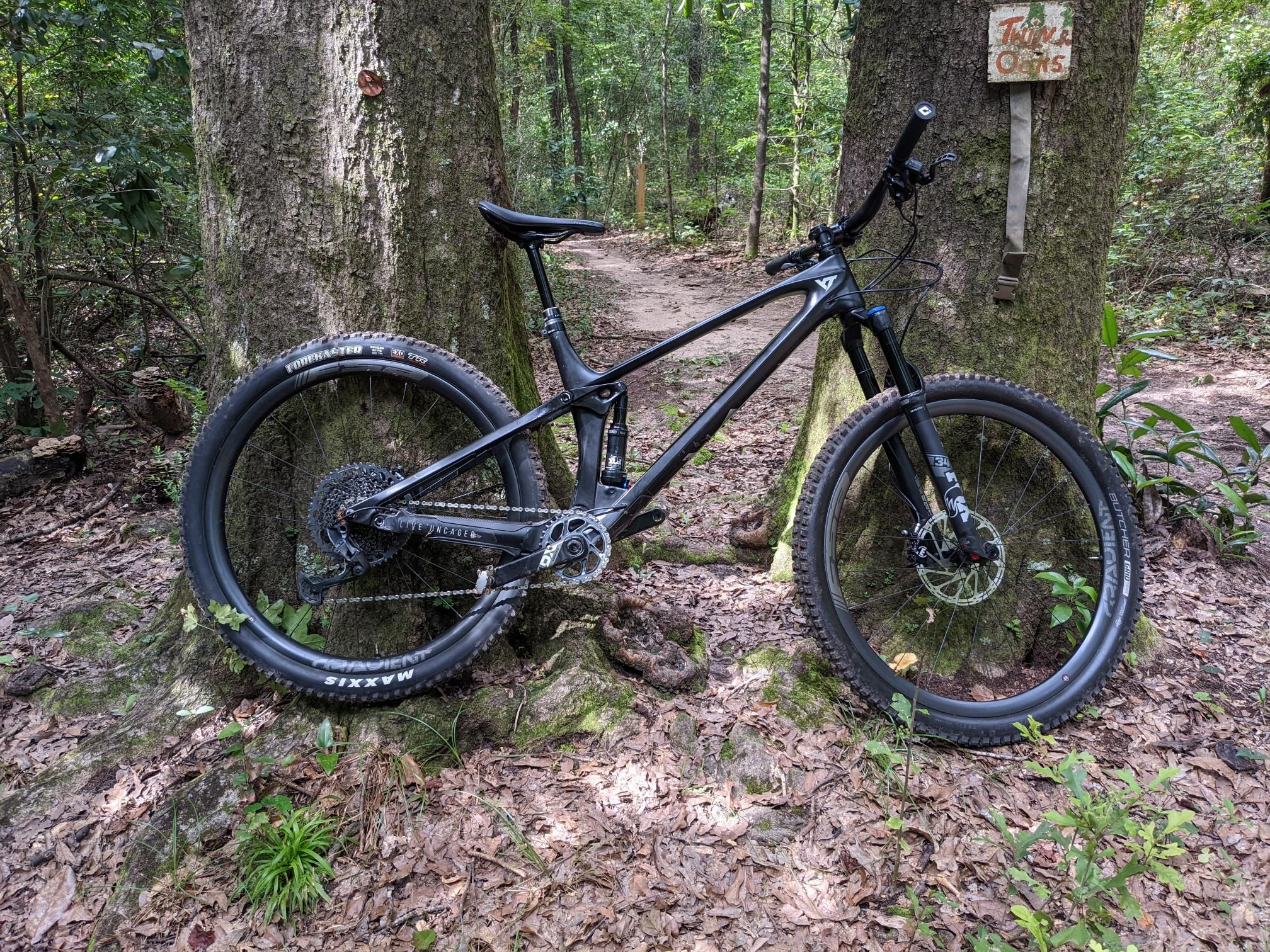
A YT Izzo, photographed in Mobile, Alabama.

- Dirtlove: Dirt Jumper
- Tues: Downhill 200mm travel
- Capra: Enduro 170/170mm travel
- Jeffsy: All - mountain 150mm/145
- Izzo: Trail 130mm
- Szepter: Gravel 40mm
- Decoy: enduro/all mountain e-bike

== Racing ==
YT began sponsoring a professional race team, the YT Mob, in 2012 with freerider Andreu Lacondeguy. Cameron Zink joined the squad in 2014; that year, Lacondeguy and Zink finished first and second at Red Bull Rampage. Aaron Gwin won the 2016 & 2017 downhill UCI Mountain Bike World Cup while a member of the YT Mob.
