= Red Bull Joyride =

Global tour of mountain bike festivals

Crankworx is a global tour of mountain bike festivals that take place in Australia, New Zealand, Austria, and Canada. The final stop of the Crankworx World Tour is a 10-day festival in Whistler, British Columbia celebrating several gravity-fed disciplines within mountain biking. Each summer the Canadian stop otherwise known as Crankworx Whistler is hosted by Whistler-Blackcomb in Whistler, British Columbia at Whistler Mountain Bike Park.

Each festival hosts a number of established competition formats such as downhill mountain biking, Dual Slalom, pump track racing and Slopestyle.

Since its inception in 2004, Crankworx has become one of Whistler's largest annual festivals. It has been called the Super Bowl of the sport, and is the biggest annual gathering of the mountain biking community.

== Festival ==
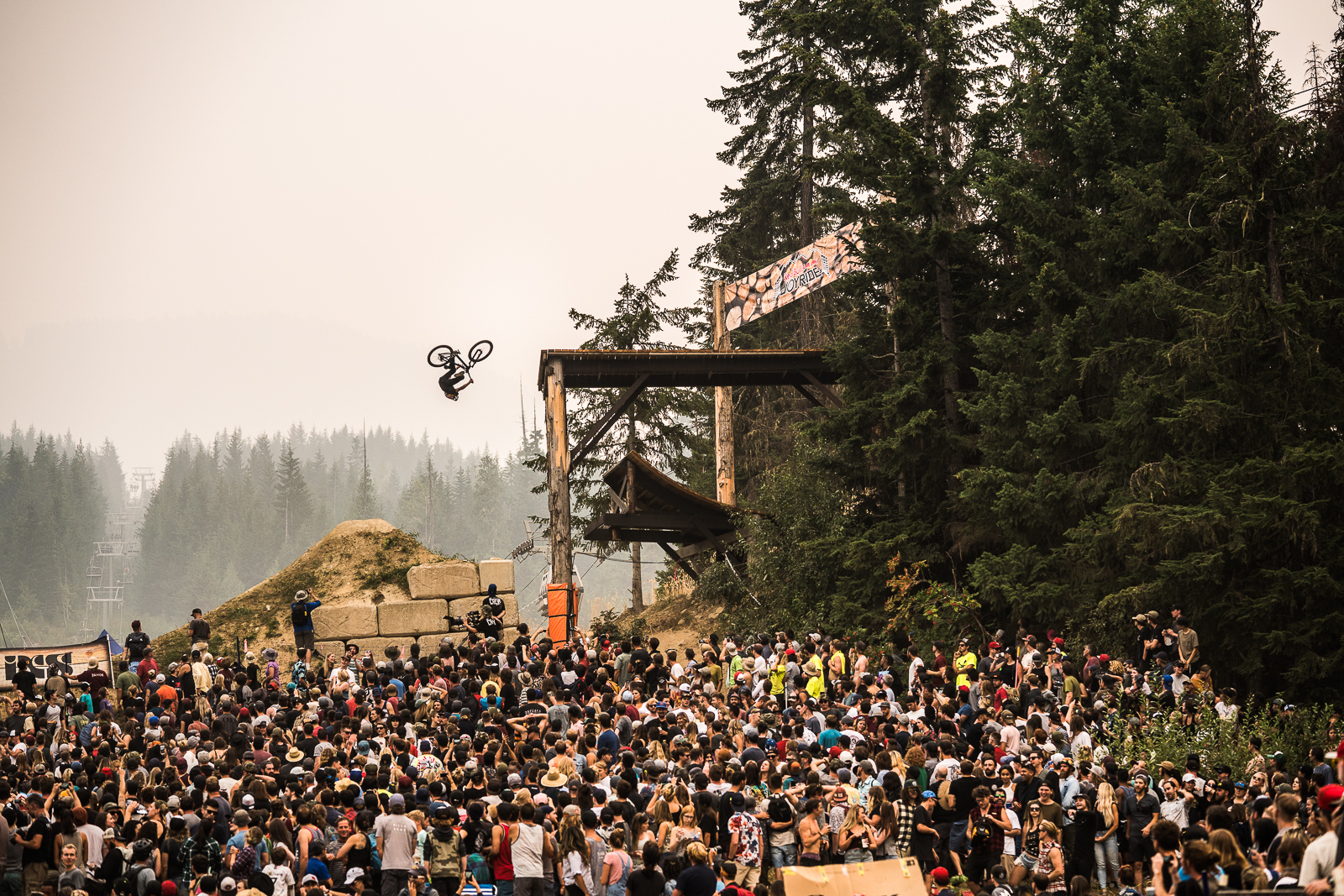
Red Bull Joyride, an event during Crankworx Whistler 2018

A central aspect of Crankworx Whistler is a series of village-wide promotional displays and activities pertaining to extreme-style mountain biking. Many events happen throughout the week including demonstrations of bicycle tricks, racing and other entertainment. There is also a collection of manufacturers' booths, and the festival serves as a cycling industry gathering. Prominent display-type advertising, for a very wide variety of products, is present throughout all events. The festival has attracted major sponsors including CLIF Bar, Dose.ca, SRAM Corporation, Redbull and various other corporate entities.

== Competitions ==
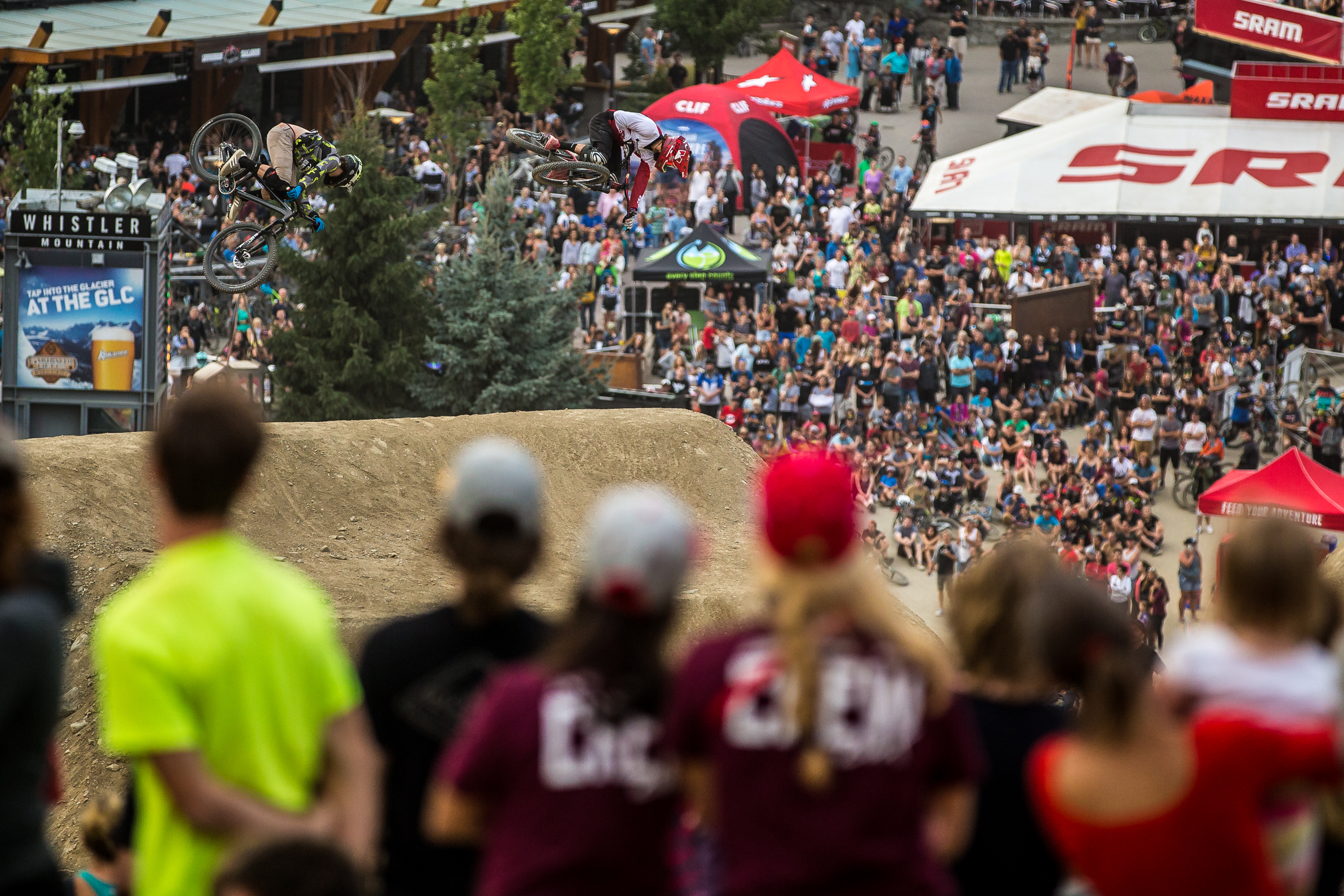

The tour includes three series events – the Crankworx Downhill World Tour, the Crankworx Pump Track World Tour and the Dual Speed & Style World Tour. Athletes accumulate points all season long en route to the coronation in Whistler, while taking on as many events as possible in an attempt to secure the toughest titles in mountain biking, the King and Queen of the Crankworx World Tour.

== Results ==
=== 2024 Results ===
Gender M	Competition	1st place	2nd place	3rd place
-	Slopestyle	Dawid Godziek	Timothy Bringer	Max Fredriksson

Gender F	Competition	1st place	2nd place	3rd place
First inaugural slopestyle event for female's	Slopestyle	Alma Wiggberg	Natasha Miller	Shealen Reno

=== 2022 Results ===
Gender	Competition	1st place	2nd place	3rd place
-	Slopestyle	Emil Johansson	Timothy Bringer	Tomas Lemoine

=== 2021 Results ===
(Crankworx BC, Silverstar Bike Park)

Gender	Competition	1st place	2nd place	3rd place
-	Slopestyle	Emil Johansson	Erik Fedko	Dawid Godziek

=== 2019 Results ===
Gender	Competition	1st place	2nd place	3rd place
-	Slopestyle	Emil Johansson	Brett Rheeder	Dawid Godziek

=== 2018 Results ===
Gender	Competition	1st place	2nd place	3rd place
-	Slopestyle	Nicholi Rogatkin	Brett Rheeder	Erik Fedko

=== 2017 Results ===
Gender	Competition	1st place	2nd place	3rd place
-	Slopestyle	Brandon Semenuk	Emil Johansson	Ryan Nyquist

=== 2016 Results ===
Gender	Competition	1st place	2nd place	3rd place
-	Slopestyle	Brett Rheeder	Thomas Genon	Max Fredriksson

=== 2015 Results ===
Gender	Competition	1st place	2nd place	3rd place
-	Slopestyle	Brandon Semenuk	Nicholi Rogatkin	Thomas Genon

=== 2014 Results ===
Gender	Competition	1st place	2nd place	3rd place
-	Slopestyle	Brandon Semenuk	Brett Rheeder	Anthony Messere

=== 2013 Results ===
Gender	Competition	1st place	2nd place	3rd place
-	Slopestyle	Brandon Semenuk	Martin Soderstrom	Sam Pilgrim

=== 2012 Results ===
Gender	Competition	1st place	2nd place	3rd place
-	Slopestyle	Thomas Genon	Martin Söderström	Cameron Mccaul

=== 2011 Results ===
Gender	Competition	1st place	2nd place	3rd place
-	Slopestyle	Brandon Semenuk	Cameron Zink	Anthony Messere

=== 2010 Results ===
Gender	Competition	1st place	2nd place	3rd place
-	Slopestyle	Cameron Zink	Mike Montgomery	Casey Groves

=== 2009 Results ===
Gender	Competition	1st place	2nd place	3rd place
-	Slopestyle	Greg Watts	Brandon Semenuk	Martin Soderstrom

=== 2008 Results ===
Gender	Competition	1st place	2nd place	3rd place
M	Dual Slalom	JD Swanguen	Nico Vink	Chris Herndon
F	Dual Slalom	Anneke Beerten	Rachel Atherton	Fionn Griffiths
M	Monster Energy Garbonzo Downhill	Gee Atherton	Sam Hill	Marc Beaumont
F	Monster Energy Garbonzo Downhill	Rachel Atherton	Fionn Griffiths	Danice Uyesugi
F	Womenzworx	Lorraine Blancher	Stephanie Nychka	Casey Brown
M	Jim Beam Air Downhill	Brian Lopes	Greg Minnaar	Chris Kovarik
F	Jim Beam Air Downhill	Rebecca McQueen	Micayla Gatto	Stephanie Nychka
M	VW Trick Showdown Session 1	Casey Groves		
M	VW Trick Showdown Session 2	Greg Watts		
M	Slopestyle	Andreu Lacondeguy	Lance McDermit	Brandon Semenuk

=== 2007 Results ===
Gender	Competition	1st place	2nd place	3rd place
-	Slopestyle	Ben Boyko	Andreu Lacondeguy	Brandon Semenuk
M	Biker X	Cedric Gracia	Michal Marosi	Andrew Neethling
F	Biker X	Jill Kinter	Fionn Griffiths	Joanna Petterson
M	Dual Slalom	Greg Minnaar	Sam Hill	JD Swanguen
F	Dual Slalom	Tracy Moseley	Joanna Petterson	Lisa Myklak
M	Air Downhill	Brian Lopes	Nathan Rennie	Greg Minnaar
F	Air Downhill	Tracy Moseley	Micayla Gatto	Fionn Griffiths
M	Canadian Open Downhill	Fabien Barel	Sam Hill	Greg Minnaar
F	Canadian Open Downhill	Tracy Moseley	Claire Buchar	Jennifer Ashton
M	Enduro Downhill	Sam Hill	Justin Leov	Andrew Neethling
F	Enduro Downhill	Tracy Moseley	Fionn Griffiths	Joanna Petterson
F	Women's Worx	Claire Buchar	Gale Dahlager	Kathy Pruitt

=== 2006 Results ===
Gender	Competition	1st place	2nd place	3rd place
-	Slopestyle	Cameron Zink	Cameron McCaul	Kyle Strait
M	Biker X	Jared Graves	Cedric Gracia	Mick Hannah
F	Biker X	Jill Kinter	Fionn Griffiths	Leana Gerrard
M	Air Downhill	Brian Lopes	Cedric Gracia	Bryn Atkinson
F	Air Downhill	Jen Ashton	Fionn Griffiths	Danika Schroter
M	Super D	Adam Craig		
F	Super D	Charlotte Klein		
M	Enduro Downhill	Sam Hill	Steve Peat	Chris Kovarik
F	Enduro Downhill	Mio Suemasa	Fionn Griffiths	Danika Schroeter

=== 2005 Results ===
Gender	Competition	1st place	2nd place	3rd place
-	Slopestyle	Paul Basagoitia	Darren Berrecloth	Cameron Zink
M	Biker X	Brian Lopes	Cedric Gracia	Bas De Bever
F	Biker X	Jill Kintner	Anneke Beerten	Fionn Griffiths
M	Air Downhill	Cedric Gracia	Brian Lopes	Steve Peat
F	Air Downhill	Sabrina Jonnier	Jennifer Ashton	Fionn Griffiths
M	Enduro Downhill	Brian Lopes	Steve Peat	Nathan Rennie
F	Enduro Downhill	Marla Streb	Fionn Griffiths	Lisa Myklak

=== 2004 Results ===
Gender	Competition	1st place	2nd place	3rd place
-	Slopestyle	Paul Basagoitia	Timo Pritzel	Kyle Strait
M	Enduro Downhill	Cedric Gracia	Tyler Morland	Nathan Rennie
F	Enduro Downhill	Kathie Pruitt	Anka Martin	Angela Tang
