= Kelly McGarry =

New Zealand freeride mountain biker (1982–2016)

- Kelly McGarry at Red Bull Rampage 2013

Personal information
- Nickname: McGazza
- Nationality: New Zealand
- Born: April 17, 1982; Wakefield, New Zealand
- Died: 1 February 2016 (aged 33); Otago, New Zealand

Sport
- Sport: Freeride Mountain Bike
- Event(s): X Games, Crankworx, Red Bull Rampage, Red Bull Joyride, Red Bull District Ride.

Kelly McGarry (17 April 1982 – 1 February 2016) was a professional New Zealand freeride mountain biker and X-Games Athlete. He was known for his best trick award in the 2013 Red Bull Rampage when he backflipped a 72-foot canyon gap. The video of the flip went viral on YouTube, getting over 200 million views. McGarry was one of the most prolific and recognised participants in the sport of freeride mountain biking. His participation in Crankworx events made him a recognisable figure in the sport, and in 2015, McGarry held the record for most consecutive appearances at the event.

== Early life and career ==
McGarry was born in Wakefield, a small settlement near Nelson. McGarry started off BMX biking and later in his career in 2006 racing in four-cross. He later moved on to freeride mountain biking. McGarry had a reputation for sending some of the biggest features and attempting some of the most daring stunts in mountain biking. His most famous and most watched feat was his massive 72-foot backflip over a canyon gap during Red Bull Rampage in 2013. With over 220 million views to date on YouTube, the trick earned McGarry the silver medal at that year’s Rampage, as well as Peoples Choice award gaining the admiration of mountain bikers and extreme sport athletes around the world. McGarry was also known to participate in daring events that pushed the sport of freeride in events like Red Bull Sky Gate. He took a heavy crash in Sky Gate that took him out for a couple of months. Many that knew McGarry knew him to be "one of the nicest and funniest guys to ever meet."

== Death ==
He was biking on the Fernhill Loop Track in Central Otago when he suffered a cardiac arrest at 4:14 pm on 1 February 2016. Two paramedics from Queenstown were taken by air to the remote part of the track, approximately 45 minutes walk from the top of the Skyline Gondola, after reports of a mountain biker suffering a "medical event". St. John Central Lakes territory manager Kelvin Perriman said that "it is understood McGarry died at the scene".

== See also ==
- List of racing cyclists and pacemakers with a cycling-related death
