= Shandro =

Shandro is a surname. Notable people with the surname include:

- Andrew Shandro (politician) (1886–1942), Canadian provincial legislator
- Andrew Shandro (born 1971), Canadian professional mountain biker
- Daryl Janet Shandro, Canadian social activist and unsuccessful candidate for Parliament, 2000
- Tyler Shandro, Alberta Minister of Labour and Immigration

== See also ==
- Shandro, Alberta, community in Canada
