= Sam Pilgrim =

British mountain biker

Personal information
- Born: 4 June 1990 (age 36) Colchester, Essex, England

Cycling career
- Sport: Cycling
- Current team: Canyon
- Disciplines: Slopestyle mountain bikes, dirt jumping
- Role: Freestyle
- Rider type: Slopestyle, dirt, freeride

Sam Pilgrim (born 4 June 1990) is a professional freeride mountain biker who also makes YouTube videos. He was an FMB World Tour overall winner in 2013, becoming the first European athlete to win the competition since its establishment in 2010.

== Early life ==
Pilgrim was born in Colchester, Essex, England and began riding mountain bikes at the age of 9 and quickly won his first competition, the Filthy 48. In 2007, he competed in his first international competition season, and at only 17 years old, he quickly became a fan favorite winning his first major competition at King of Dirt in Austria.

== Sponsors ==
He is sponsored by Canyon, Motul, GoPro, Swatch, TSG, Halo Wheels, Aertime and Ergon.

== Achievement ==
Pilgrim has won dozens of FMB competitions such as Red Bull District Ride in 2011, competing in Dew Tour, various Crankworx events, and the X-Games. He placed 3rd overall in 2011 in the FMB World Tour. He placed 5th overall in 2012 in the FMB World Tour Rankings and 6th overall in 2010.

- Won FMB World Tour (1st overall)
- 1st 26Trix
- 1st NS Bikes Slopestyle
- 1st FISE Slopestyle Montpellier
- 1st Swatch Rocket Air
- 1st Teva Slopestyle
- 2nd Bearclaw Invitational
- 2nd at Crankworx L2A
- 2nd Red Bull Berg Line
- 3rd Red Bull Joyride (Diamond Series)
- 5th at Colorado Freeride Festival
- 14th Overall at X-Games Munich
- Placed 29th at Red Bull Rampage
- Ridden at Bemerton Heath Pump Track
