= Jeff Lenosky =

American racing cyclist (born 1971)

Personal information
- Born: USA

Cycling career
- Sport: Cycling
- Discipline: Freeride

Professional team
- 1993–present: –

Major wins
- Teva Mountain Games Champion (2006)

Jeff Lenosky (born April 19, 1971) is an American professional freeride rider.

== Personal information ==
He lives in Sparta Township, New Jersey with his wife Amy and their children. He is a graduate of East Stroudsburg University of Pennsylvania.
