= Robin Goomes =

New Zealand mountain biker

Robin Goomes is a New Zealand mountain biker. In 2024, 2025 and 2026 she won the women's section of the Red Bull Rampage freeride mountain bike event.

== Biography ==
Goomes was born in Christchurch and grew up on the Chatham Islands, where her mother was a Department of Conservation ranger. She attended high school in Christchurch, returning to the Chatham Islands for term holidays. Towards the end of her high school years the family moved to Auckland, where she attended Takapuna Grammar School.

In 2021, Goomes won the Crankworx Innsbruck Whip-Off. In 2024, she competed in the Red Bull Rampage downhill mountain bike event in Utah, USA. She performed two back-flips to win the Best Trick Award, and also won the women's section of the event.

In 2025, Goomes won the Red Bull Rampage women's competition again with a run that included two backflips.
