= Dawid Godziek =

Polish cyclist (born 1994)

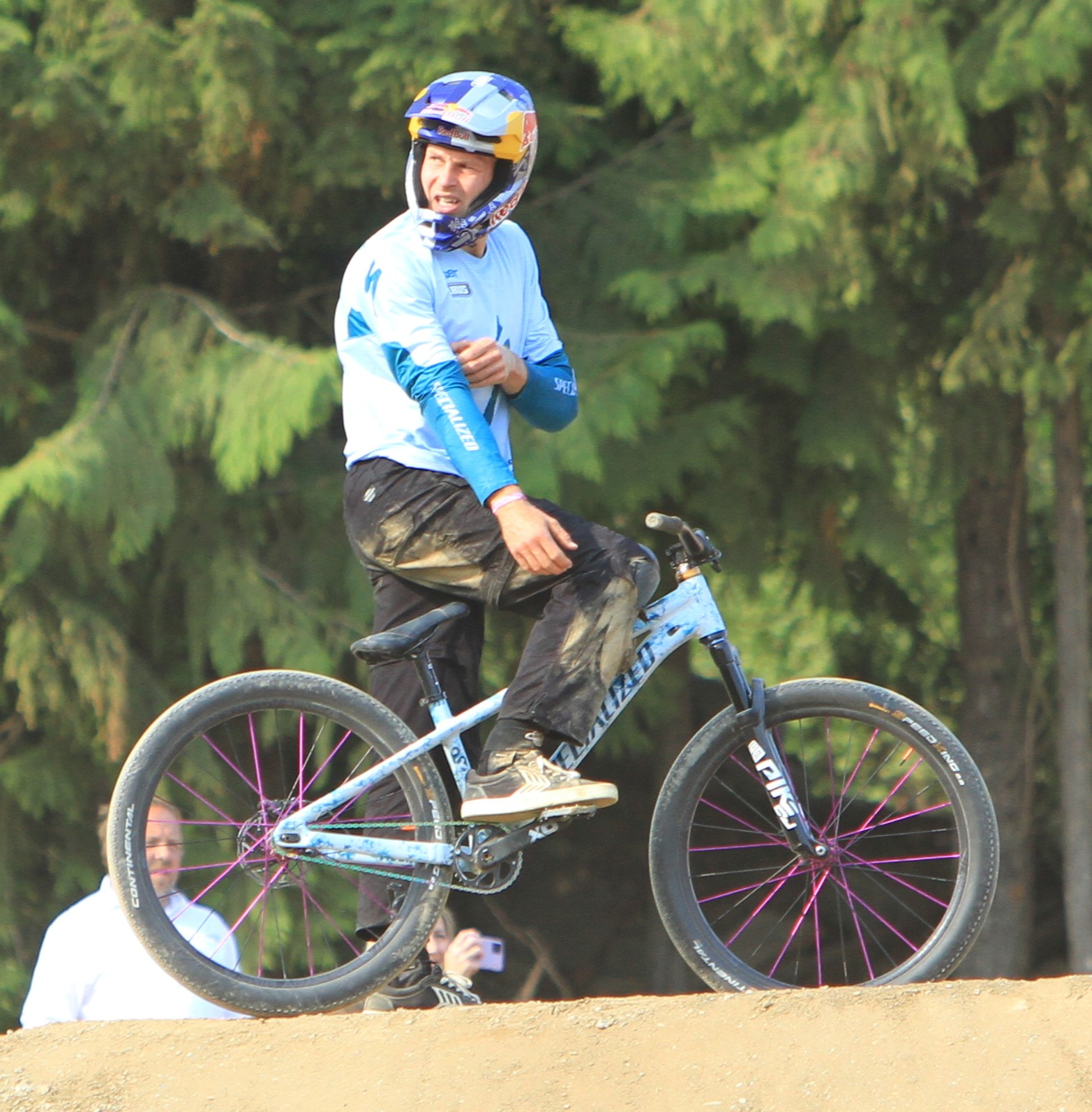
- Godziek in 2024

Personal information
- Born: 10 August 1994 (age 32) Suszec, Poland

Sport
- Country: Poland
- Sport: Freeride, BMX
- Events: X Games, Red Bull Joyride, Crankworx
Medal record
Competition
Gold medal – first place	Red Bull Joyride 2024	MTB Slopestyle
Gold medal – first place	2022 X-Games	BMX Dirt
Gold medal – first place	X Games Sydney 2018	BMX Dirt
Bronze medal – third place	X-Games California 2023	BMX Dirt Best Trick
Bronze medal – third place	X Games Minneapolis 2019	BMX Dirt Best Trick
Bronze medal – third place	Red Bull Joyride 2021	MTB Slopestyle
Bronze medal – third place	Red Bull Joyride 2019	MTB Slopestyle

Dawid Godziek (born 10 August 1994) is a Polish cyclist BMX and Freeride Mountain biker. He is a two-time X-Games gold medalist (2018 and 2022) in the BMX Dirt competition. He has also won the Freeride Mountain Bike 2024 Crankworx Triple Crown.

== Career ==
He first competed at X Games Minneapolis 2018 in BMX Dirt but didn't podium. However, later in 2018, he was the first Pole to win the X-Games gold medal in the BMX Dirt competition. In 2019, he took the bronze medal in the X Games BMX Dirt. In 2019, he took (bronze medal) in X Games BMX Dirt. After a three-year break, during which he focused on MTB Slopestyle, he won an X-Games Gold again in 2022.

In 2018, he was the first in the world to perform a trick on MTB called Quad Tailwhip, as well as 720* Frontflip Nohand to Barspin (also known as Twister Nohand to Barspin), which he earned a bronze medal in the X-Games California competition for.

In 2024, Godziek emerged victorious in the Crankworx FMBA Slopestyle World Championships.

In 2026, Godziek won the inaugural Crankworx Slopestyle Super League World Championship.
