= Mark Matthews (mountain biker) =

Mountain biker

- Born: 1987 (age 38–39); Victoria, British Columbia
- Occupation: Mountain biker
- Notable work: Barred for Life; Alchemy; A Hard Tale; Changing Seasons; Moment; Hometown
- Website: www.markymath.com

Mark Matthews (born 1987) is a professional mountain biker.

== See also ==
- List of professional mountain bikers
