= Nelson, British Columbia =

Nelson
- City
- City of Nelson
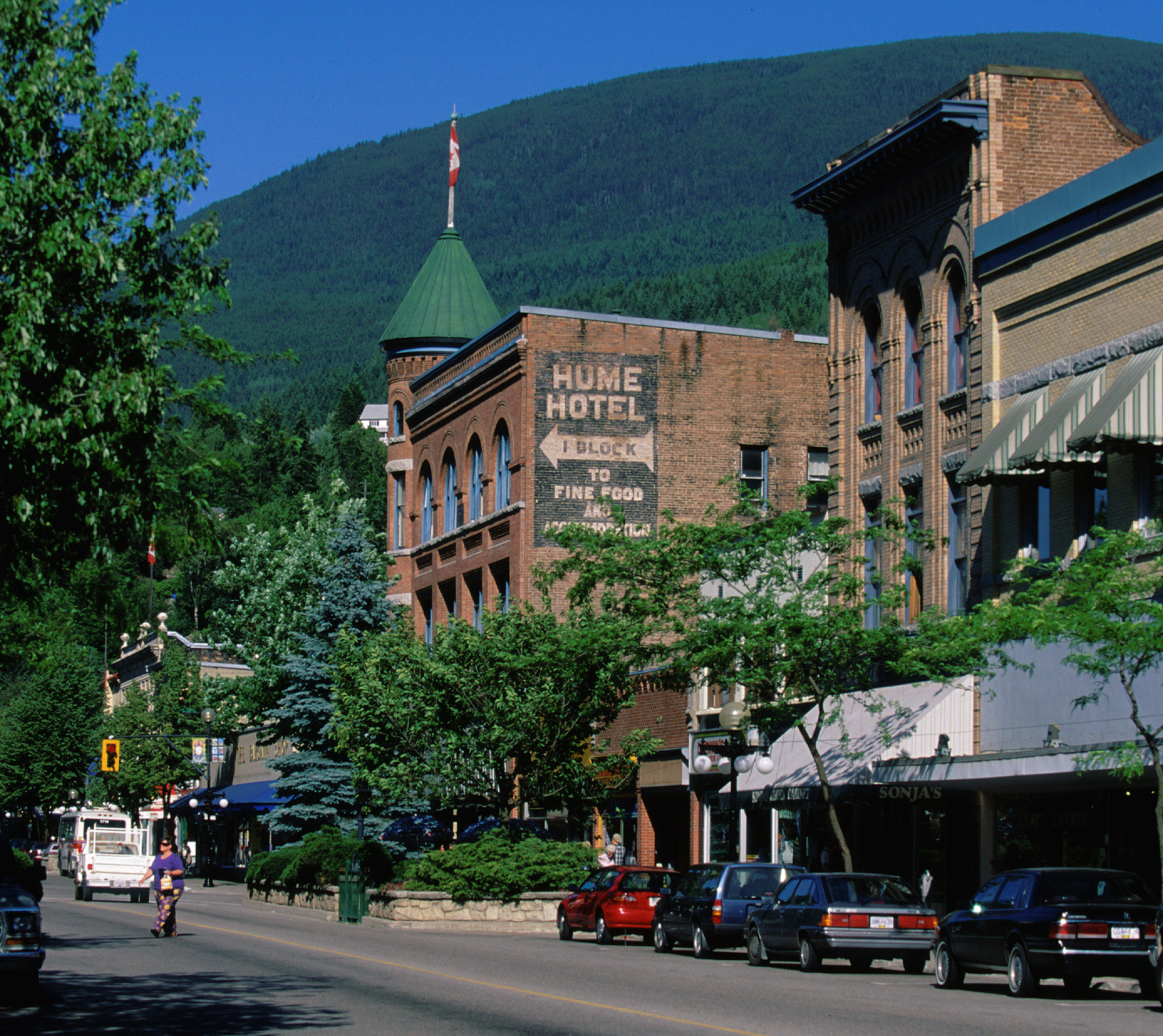
- Historic Baker Street

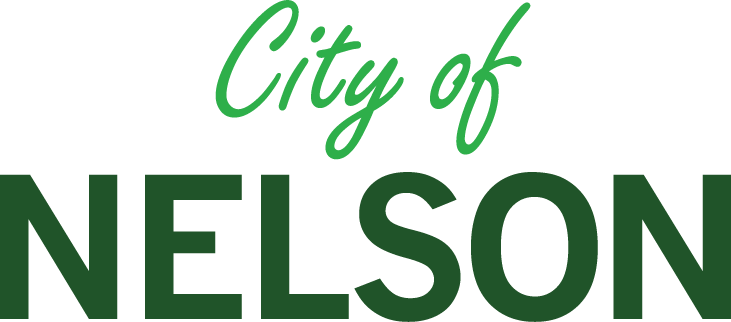
- Coat of arms
- Nickname: The Queen City
- Motto: "Forge Ahead"
- Location of City of Nelson within British Columbia, Canada
- Coordinates: 49°30′0″N 117°17′0″W
- Country: Canada
- Province: British Columbia
- Region: Kootenays
- Regional district: Central Kootenay
- Incorporated: 1897
- Named for: Hugh Nelson

Government
  - Type: Elected city council
  - Mayor: Janice Morrison
  - Governing body: Nelson City Council
  - MP: Rob Morrison (CPC)
  - MLA: Brittny Anderson (BC NDP)

Area
  - Land: 11.93 km^{2} (4.61 sq mi)
- Elevation: 535 m (1,755 ft)

Population (2021)
  - Total: 11,198
  - Density: 938.6/km^{2} (2,431/sq mi)
- Time zone: UTC−07:00 (PT)
- Forward sortation area: V1L
- Area codes: 250, 778, 236, 672
- Highways: Highway 6 Highway 3A
- Website: nelson.ca

Nelson is a city in British Columbia, Canada. The city serves as the seat of the Regional District of Central Kootenay. It is represented in the provincial legislature by the riding of Nelson-Creston and in the Parliament of Canada by the riding of Columbia-Kootenay-Southern Rockies. The city contains numerous heritage buildings constructed during the regional silver rush of 1886. Along with Castlegar and Trail, Nelson is one of three cities forming the commercial and population centers of the West Kootenay region.

== History ==
=== Founding and early history ===
In 1867, gold and silver deposits were discovered in the area. Additional silver deposits were discovered at Toad Mountain in 1886, leading to rapid population growth and the town's incorporation in 1897.

To support the growing community, two railways were constructed through Nelson. The town developed into a transportation and distribution hub. Its proximity to major transportation routes also made it an important supply centre for regional mining operations.

Nelson was founded in 1889 and named in honour of Hugh Nelson, then Lieutenant-Governor of British Columbia. A steamboat dock was constructed in 1892. In 1896, the newly built hydroelectric plant at Cottonwood Falls began generating electricity for the city, becoming the first hydroelectric plant in British Columbia.

=== Early 20th century ===
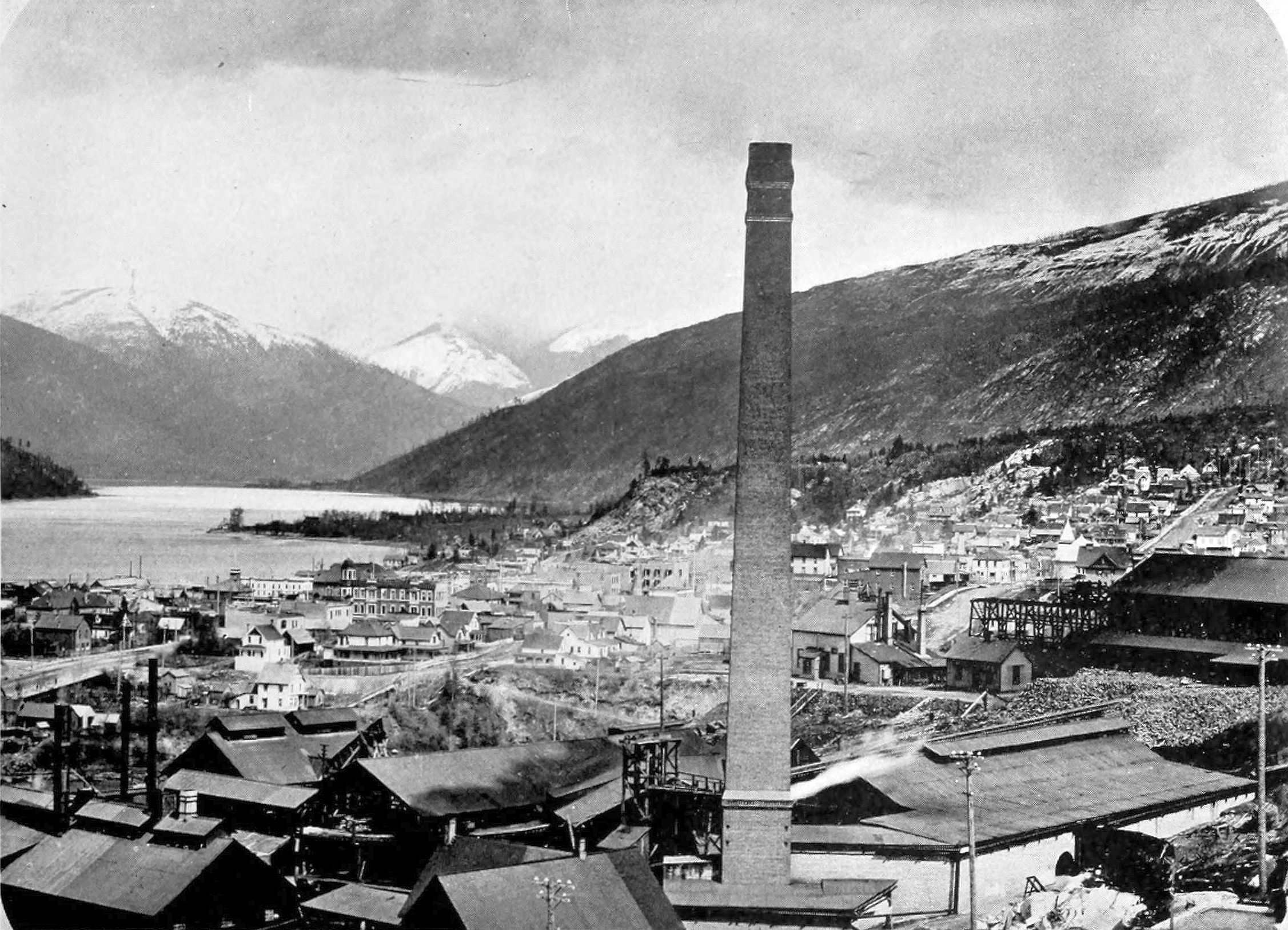
Nelson, 1903

Architect Francis Rattenbury designed the granite courthouse and other civic buildings. By the 1900s, Nelson possessed several hotels, a Hudson's Bay Company store, and an electric streetcar system. Mining and forestry also contributed to the town's economy.

English immigrants planted lakeside orchards, and Doukhobors from Russia, sponsored by Tolstoy and the Quakers, farmed the flat lands between the mountains, known as benchlands. The Doukhobor museum is located nearby, close to the neighbouring town of Castlegar.

From 1917 to 1919, Nelson used single transferable vote (STV), a form of proportional representation, to elect its councillors. Councillors were elected in one at-large district. Each voter cast a single vote using a ranked ballot.

During the Vietnam War, many American draft evaders settled in Nelson and the surrounding area. The town took on the nickname "Resisterville." Those U.S. draft evaders organized several intentional communities in the Nelson area: Harmony's Gate, The Reds and the Blues, and New Family. As a successor to those intentional communities, the Middle Road Community commune was founded in Nelson in 1996.

Nelson's mountainous geography kept growth confined to the narrow valley bottom, except for specific hillside structures such as the local high school and the former Notre Dame University College (NDU) campus. Throughout the 1960s and 1970s, when more prosperous cities were demolishing and rebuilding their downtown areas according to contemporary design trends, Nelson merchants clad their buildings in aluminum siding.

=== Baker Street ===
Baker Street is located in Nelson's historic district. In the early 1980s, Nelson faced an economic downturn when the local Kootenay Forest Products sawmill was closed. Downtown merchants had begun competing with a large regional shopping centre, the Chahko Mika Mall, on Nelson's central waterfront. At the time, larger cities such as Victoria and Vancouver were undergoing historical restorations of their oldest areas. Nelson began similar work, removing the aluminum exteriors and restoring buildings. American immigrant and designer Robert Inwood provided consulting services to the city.

== Geography ==
=== Climate ===
Nelson has a humid continental climate (Köppen Dfb) with four distinct seasons. Winters are cold and snowy, while summers are warm and drier, with cool temperatures during the night.

Climate data for South Slocan (approximately 20 km west of Nelson)
Month	Jan	Feb	Mar	Apr	May	Jun	Jul	Aug	Sep	Oct	Nov	Dec	Year
Record high °C (°F)	10.0 (50.0)	14.5 (58.1)	22.5 (72.5)	30.0 (86.0)	35.5 (95.9)	38.0 (100.4)	41.0 (105.8)	39.5 (103.1)	36.1 (97.0)	26.1 (79.0)	17.2 (63.0)	11.7 (53.1)	41.0 (105.8)
Mean daily maximum °C (°F)	−0.2 (31.6)	3.6 (38.5)	9.3 (48.7)	15.5 (59.9)	20.4 (68.7)	24.2 (75.6)	28.0 (82.4)	28.5 (83.3)	21.7 (71.1)	13.8 (56.8)	4.8 (40.6)	0.2 (32.4)	14.1 (57.4)
Daily mean °C (°F)	−3.7 (25.3)	−0.6 (30.9)	3.5 (38.3)	8.3 (46.9)	12.7 (54.9)	16.4 (61.5)	19.1 (66.4)	19.3 (66.7)	13.8 (56.8)	7.6 (45.7)	1.5 (34.7)	−2.9 (26.8)	7.9 (46.2)
Mean daily minimum °C (°F)	−7.1 (19.2)	−4.9 (23.2)	−2.3 (27.9)	1.0 (33.8)	4.9 (40.8)	8.5 (47.3)	10.1 (50.2)	10.0 (50.0)	5.8 (42.4)	1.4 (34.5)	−1.9 (28.6)	−5.9 (21.4)	1.6 (34.9)
Record low °C (°F)	−31.7 (−25.1)	−30.6 (−23.1)	−22.2 (−8.0)	−7.8 (18.0)	−6.1 (21.0)	0.0 (32.0)	2.8 (37.0)	2.2 (36.0)	−4.4 (24.1)	−11.0 (12.2)	−23.5 (−10.3)	−35.0 (−31.0)	−35.0 (−31.0)
Average precipitation mm (inches)	94.0 (3.70)	69.8 (2.75)	62.4 (2.46)	61.0 (2.40)	68.2 (2.69)	71.1 (2.80)	54.4 (2.14)	49.4 (1.94)	51.4 (2.02)	61.6 (2.43)	104.0 (4.09)	105.9 (4.17)	853.2 (33.59)
Average rainfall mm (inches)	39.0 (1.54)	48.4 (1.91)	56.5 (2.22)	60.3 (2.37)	68.2 (2.69)	71.1 (2.80)	54.4 (2.14)	49.4 (1.94)	51.4 (2.02)	59.8 (2.35)	78.9 (3.11)	42.7 (1.68)	680.0 (26.77)
Average snowfall cm (inches)	55.1 (21.7)	21.3 (8.4)	5.9 (2.3)	0.7 (0.3)	0 (0)	0 (0)	0 (0)	0 (0)	0 (0)	1.8 (0.7)	25.2 (9.9)	63.3 (24.9)	173.2 (68.2)
Average precipitation days (≥ 0.2 mm)	14.1	12.7	13.3	12.5	13.7	13.2	10.0	8.8	8.6	11.3	15.1	14.6	147.8
Average rainy days (≥ 0.2 mm)	6.8	8.9	12.4	12.5	13.7	13.2	10.0	8.8	8.6	11.2	12.2	5.7	123.9
Average snowy days (≥ 0.2 cm)	9.2	4.8	1.8	0.24	0	0	0	0	0	0.38	4.9	10.2	31.5
Source: Environment Canada

== Demographics ==
In the 2021 Census of Population conducted by Statistics Canada, Nelson had a population of 11,198. Of its 5,314 total private dwellings, 4,948 were occupied, an increase of 5.1% from the 2016 population of 10,572. With a land area of 11.93 km^{2} (4.61 sq mi), it had a population density of 938.6/km^{2} (2,431.1/sq mi) in 2021.

According to the Nelson Star, Nelson's poverty rate is nearly double the provincial and national averages.

=== Ethnicity ===
Panethnic groups in the City of Nelson (2001–2021)
Panethnic group	2021		2016		2011		2006		2001	
Panethnic group	Pop.	%	Pop.	%	Pop.	%	Pop.	%	Pop.	%
European (Note: Statistic includes all persons that did not makeup part of a visible minority or an Indigenous identity.)	9,135	85.17%	9,160	89.32%	9,270	92.89%	8,440	92.9%	8,690	94.82%
Indigenous	585	5.45%	560	5.46%	425	4.26%	300	3.3%	175	1.91%
East Asian (Note: Statistic includes total responses of "Chinese", "Korean", and "Japanese" under visible minority section on census.)	275	2.56%	210	2.05%	165	1.65%	165	1.82%	165	1.8%
South Asian	245	2.28%	85	0.83%	55	0.55%	90	0.99%	35	0.38%
Southeast Asian (Note: Statistic includes total responses of "Filipino" and "Southeast Asian" under visible minority section on census.)	215	2%	70	0.68%	0	0%	10	0.11%	10	0.11%
Latin American	90	0.84%	60	0.59%	25	0.25%	30	0.33%	10	0.11%
African	80	0.75%	60	0.59%	15	0.15%	30	0.33%	25	0.27%
Middle Eastern (Note: Statistic includes total responses of "West Asian" and "Arab" under visible minority section on the census.)	10	0.09%	10	0.1%	0	0%	0	0%	35	0.38%
Other/multiracial (Note: Statistic includes total responses of "Visible minority, n.i.e." and "Multiple visible minorities" under visible minority section on census.)	75	0.7%	55	0.54%	0	0%	25	0.28%	30	0.33%
Total responses	10,725	96.57%	10,255	97%	9,980	97.56%	9,085	98.13%	9,165	98.57%
Total population	11,106	100%	10,572	100%	10,230	100%	9,258	100%	9,298	100%
Note: Totals greater than 100% due to multiple origin responses.

=== Religion ===
According to the 2021 census, religious groups in Nelson included:

- Irreligion (7,415 persons or 69.1%)
- Christianity (2,675 persons or 24.9%)
- Buddhism (150 persons or 1.4%)
- Judaism (115 persons or 1.1%)
- Sikhism (70 persons or 0.7%)
- Hinduism (65 persons or 0.6%)
- Islam (20 persons or 0.2%)
- Indigenous Spirituality (10 persons or 0.1%)

== Economy ==
Nelson's economy has traditionally been shaped by forestry and other extractive industries. Although these sectors play a smaller role than they once did, they remain part of the local economic base. Nelson also functions as an administrative centre for the Kootenays, with regional offices of both provincial and federal governments located in the city. Tourism has grown and contributes to the local economy.

Nelson has several retailers specializing in natural and organic foods. The Kootenay Co-op operates a year-round market and grocery store focused on natural foods, while the local Save-On-Foods includes an expanded selection of organic products. Local manufacturing includes the Nelson Brewing Company, a microbrewery based in the city.

In the late 20th and early 21st centuries, Nelson and the surrounding region were reported as centres of illegal marijuana production. In 2010, The Guardian reported that marijuana cultivation contributed to a shift in the local economy toward arts, culture, and outdoor recreation.

== Arts and culture ==
=== Education ===
Nelson has a history of offering art education programs; art education has always been part of the local secondary school curriculum. An independent Nelson School of Fine Art (NSFA), led by Yugoslavian immigrant Zeljko Kujundzic, began offering two-week programs on a provisional fashion in 1960. When the NSFA expanded its program to offer a diploma, it was renamed Kootenay School of Art. The school received support from the provincial government. In 1969, the school's studio training was relocated to the city's Notre Dame University campus. In 1972, direct support from the province for its programs ended. Soon thereafter, while remaining at the Notre Dame campus, the school was steered into a "trial" merger with the regional Selkirk College. Once the school was fully merged into Selkirk College, it began offering graduate internships and became affiliated with Eastern Washington University, then known as Eastern Washington State College.

When Notre Dame University closed in 1977, so did the Kootenay School of Art. It was succeeded in 1979 by offerings of the University of Victoria–sponsored David Thompson University Centre in the former Notre Dame buildings. In 1991, an independent institution emphasizing fine crafts, Kootenay School of the Arts, was founded. A few years later, the school secured possession of a stone heritage building in Nelson's central area. In 2006, the school was absorbed by Selkirk College as a department, remaining in its own building but renamed Kootenay Studio Arts. (In addition, since the 1990s, Selkirk College has offered its School of Music & Media programs in the former Notre Dame buildings.)

In 2002, former writing and visual-art faculty from the Kootenay School of the Arts (KSA) founded the independent, artist-run Nelson Fine Art Centre Society. In 2005, the Society opened the Oxygen Art Centre in downtown Nelson, offering classes, exhibitions, and residencies.

In 2025, Selkirk College decided to terminate the KSA programs at the end of June 2026. However, it was announced on April 29, 2026 that the Nelson City Council decided the KSA Victoria Street building's new leaseholder will be the Nelson Community Land Trust, working in collaboration with "key partners and anchor tenants". Among them is the newly formed Kootenay School of the Arts Society (KSAS), a non-profit organization established to carry forward KSA's educational programming.

=== Exhibitions ===
The former post office building at 502 Vernon Street, home to the Nelson Museum, Archives & Gallery (NMAG), provides gallery space for travelling exhibitions and for works by regional artists.

The Nelson & District Arts Council holds an annual ArtWalk event in downtown Nelson to promote the work of regional visual and performing artists. Exhibitions take place for ten weeks from July to September.

=== Films ===
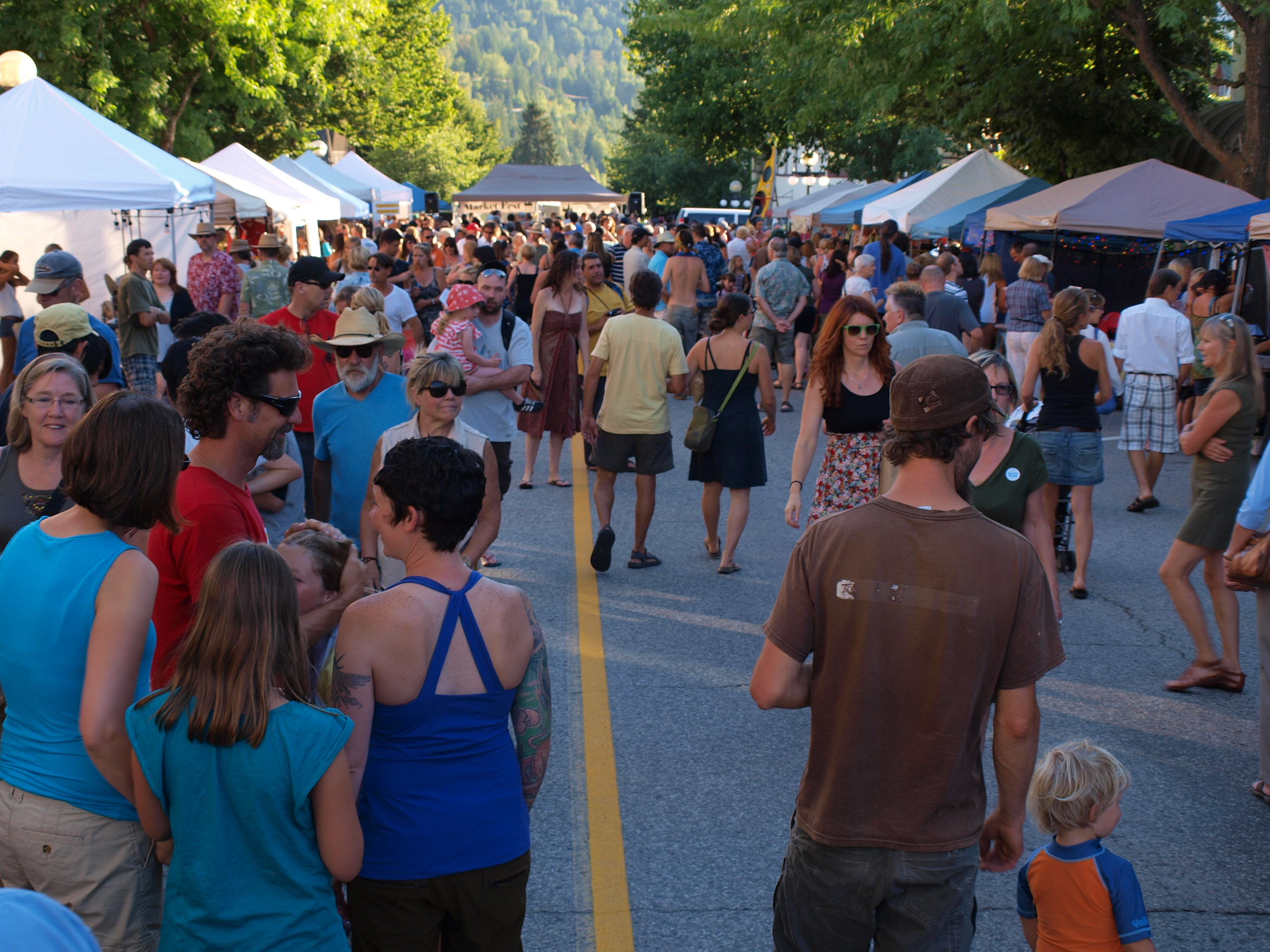
Nelson Marketfest

In 1986, producer Steve Martin chose to film the feature film Roxanne primarily in Nelson, using the local fire hall as a filming location.

In 1986, the film director Bill Forsyth filmed the movie Housekeeping, starring Christine Lahti, in Nelson.

== Sports ==
Club	League	Sport	Venue	Established	Championships
Nelson Leafs	KIJHL	Ice Hockey	Nelson Community Complex	1932	5
Kootenay Chill	Thompson-Okanawgan Basketball League	Basketball	Lavelle Rojers Gym	2017, created by the Nelson Hoops Association	1

== Infrastructure ==
=== Transportation ===
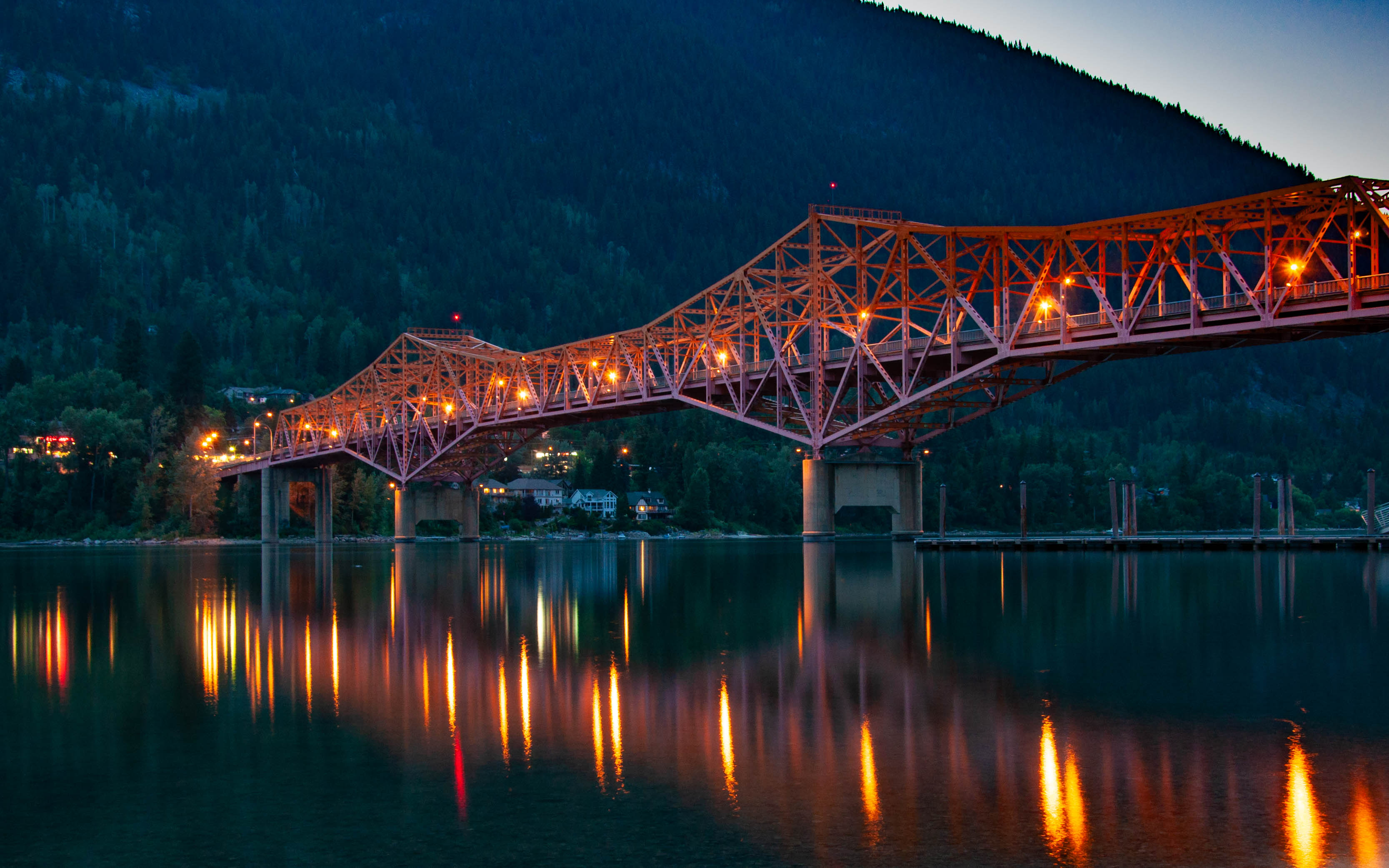
The "Big Orange Bridge" carries Highway 3A over the west arm of Kootenay Lake, just north of downtown Nelson.

Highways 3A and 6 pass through Nelson. Scheduled commercial airline service is available at the West Kootenay Regional Airport in Castlegar, approximately 43 kilometres (27 mi) southwest of the city. Trail Airport is another nearby facility, while Nelson Airport (which does not provide scheduled service) is located several blocks from downtown. Public transit in Nelson is provided by the West Kootenay Transit System, which operates several routes within the city and to neighbouring communities.

Both Level 2 and Level 3 (DC fast-charging) electric vehicle charging stations have been installed in the city. A carsharing service is available in the town through the Kootenay Carshare Co-operative.

Nelson Pier is a lake pier designed by Matthew Stanley in Nelson. The pier was designed to symbolize the connection between the city and the lake.

Nelson is served by the freight-only Kootenay Valley Railway, an internal business unit of the Canadian Pacific Railway. Nelson is the historic headquarters of the CPR Kootenay Division, serving as the meeting point of the CPR Boundary subdivision running towards Castlegar, British Columbia, and the CPR Nelson subdivision running towards Cranbrook.

== Education ==
School District 8 Kootenay Lake (often called SB8) operates public schools in Nelson and the surrounding communities.

Schools include Nelson Christian Community School (NCCS), K-Gr. 8, and St. Joseph's Catholic School.

The Conseil scolaire francophone de la Colombie-Britannique operates one French-language school: école des Sentiers-alpins.

Nelson is home to the Tenth Street and Silver King campuses of Selkirk College, which absorbed Kootenay School of the Arts as a department and was renamed Kootenay Studio Arts.

Kootenay Columbia College of Integrative Health Sciences has three campuses on Baker Street in Nelson.

== Media ==
=== Radio ===
- CJLY-FM 93.5 (Kootenay Co-op Radio)
- CBYN-FM 98.7 (CBC Radio One; repeats CBTK-FM Kelowna)
- CHNV-FM 103.5 ("The Bridge")
- CKKC-FM 106.9 ("EZ Rock")

=== Print ===
The Nelson Daily News was a local newspaper that began publishing in 1902. In 2010, it was announced that the paper would cease publication, with the final edition published on July 16, 2010. The closure occurred shortly after Black Press acquired the Nelson Daily News, which purchased the paper from Glacier Media Inc.

Black Press prioritized the publication and circulation of the Nelson Star, which is published twice weekly, on Wednesdays and Fridays. It began publishing twice weekly in 2010. The Nelson Star now circulates to over 9,000 recipients.

== Notable people ==
- Greg Adams, former professional hockey player
- Sarah Allen, actress
- Edward Applewhaite, politician
- Nancy Argenta, soprano singer
- Beth, drag queen
- Selwyn G. Blaylock, mining official
- Robbie Bourdon, freeride mountain biker
- Margaret Catley-Carlson, civil servant
- Anne DeGrace, writer and illustrator
- Alana DeLong, politician
- Syd Desireau, professional hockey player
- Benno Friesen, politician, professor
- Danny Gare, former professional hockey player and coach
- James E. Gill, geologist, engineer
- Ona Grauer, actress
- Robert Hampton Gray, naval officer and pilot, Victoria Cross recipient
- John Greyson, director and writer
- Ted Hargreaves, professional hockey player and coach
- Lillian Hickey, All-American Girls Professional Baseball League player
- John Houston, newspaper editor and politician
- Levi William Humphrey, politician
- Tim Hus, country and folk singer
- Martin Michael Johnson, bishop
- Lionel Kearns, poet and teacher
- Geoff Kinrade, professional hockey player
- Laurelee Kopeck, field hockey player
- Patrick Lane, poet
- Mike Laughton, professional hockey player
- Edna Malone, dancer
- Thomas Middleditch, actor, writer
- Kliph Nesteroff, writer
- John Newlove, poet
- Frederick Niven, writer
- Bri Price, musician
- Pat Price, professional hockey player
- Sandy Santori, politician
- Adham Shaikh, composer, sound designer
- Kurt Sorge, freeride mountain biker
- Norman Symonds, musician
- Daniel C. Van Norman, educator, clergyman, school founder
- Tom Velisek, snowboarder
- Padma Viswanathan, playwright
- Jack Wright, tennis player

== See also ==
- Nelson City (provincial electoral district)
- Kootenay Central, a provincial electoral district, formerly Nelson-Creston
- List of electoral districts in the Kootenays
- List of francophone communities in British Columbia
