= Graham Agassiz =

Canadian cyclist

Personal information
- Nationality: Canadian
- Born: 8 January 1990 (age 36) Kamloops, British Columbia, Canada

Sport
- Sport: Freeride (mountain biking), Freestyle motocross, Snowbike

Achievements and titles
- Highest world ranking: 12th (FBM World ranking)
Medal record
Competition
Bronze medal – third place	Red Bull Rampage 2015	Freeride

Graham Agassiz (born 8 January 1990) is a Canadian freeride mountain biker from Kamloops, British Columbia.

Agassiz travels internationally, and has participated in mountain bike films and competitions. He is a bronze medalist from 2015 Red Bull Rampage event. He was also the top qualifier at the Red Bull Rampage in 2014. He also began hosting a mountain bike competition at the Kamloops Bike Ranch in 2014. In 2010 he had the best year in Freeride Mountain Bike World Tours placing 12th overall in rankings. He also had a special documentary film featured by X-Games called from "Ashes to Agassiz" the film debuted on 25 August, of 2015.

Agassiz' sponsors include Monster Energy, YT Bicycles, RockShox, Dakine, SRAM, Giro, and We Are One Composites.
