= Andreu Lacondeguy =

Spanish cyclist (born 1989)

Personal information
- Full name: Andreu Lacondeguy
- Nationality: España
- Born: 12 January 1989 (age 37) Barcelona, Catalonia, Spain
- Occupation(s): Freeride & Freestyle motocross rider
- Other interests: BMX

Sport
- Country: Spain
- Events: X Games; Red Bull Rampage; Masters of Dirt; Farm Jam Festival; Crankworx
- Team: Fox Racing, YT Industries, Commencal
Medal record
Competition
Gold medal – first place	Red Bull Rampage 2014	Freeride
Gold medal – first place	Red Bull Berg Line 2012	Slopestyle
Gold medal – first place	Red Bull District Ride 2011	Best Trick
Gold medal – first place	Red Bull Joyride 2008	Freeride
Silver medal – second place	Red Bull Rampage 2018	Freeride
Silver medal – second place	Red Bull Rampage 2015	Freeride
Silver medal – second place	Red Bull Joyride 2007	Slopestyle
Bronze medal – third place	2013 Munich X-Games	Slopestyle MTB
Bronze medal – third place	Masters of Dirt 2012	FMX
- Updated on 26 November 2020

Andreu Lacondeguy is a Freeride Mountain biker and Freestyle motocross athlete from Barcelona, Catalonia, Spain, born 12 January 1989. He is a 2013 Munich X-Games bronze medalist in the Mountain Bike Slopestyle event and a Red Bull Rampage Winner in 2014.

== Personal ==
Andreu Lacondeguy grew up in Montseny, near Barcelona, and began Four-Cross racing at the age of 10 and became regional champion; he then moved to BMX and downhill mountain biking racing, and won a contract with Team Maxxis when he was 15. He and his brother Lluís, who is also a professional mountain bike racer, hone their skills in California. Andreau has also competed in Freestyle Motocross himself and often takes his FMX experience and tricks to the Freeride Mountain Bike world.

He has "Love Dirt" tattooed on his fingers.

== Career ==
In 2008 he won Crankworx Whistler and also became one of the first to land a double backflip on a mountain bike in competition; he was the first to land a backflip from a snow-covered big air ramp. In 2012 he won the Red Bull Berg Line event in Winterberg, In 2013 Lacondeguy earned a Bronze medal in the Munich X-Games Slopestyle event, and in 2014 he won the Red Bull Rampage. He came second in 2015 and 2018. He also placed Fourth in 2010, 2012, and 2013, just shy of the podium.

In 2015, he and Kurt Sorge, Graham Aggasiz, Nico Vink, Makken Haugen and Nick Pescetto launched the Fest series of one-week invitational Freeride meets at locations all around the world.

In 2013, Farm Jam Festival he would win the MTB "Dirt Jam" contest. He, would compete in both the FMX and BMX Dirt contest; being the first to ever compete in all three events.
