= Brett Rheeder =

Canadian cyclist (born 1993)

Personal information
- Nationality: Canada
- Born: February 16, 1993 (age 33) Mount Albert, Ontario Canada

Sport
- Sport: Freeride/Slopestyle Mountain Bike
- Rank: 4x Crankworx overall FMBA Slopestyle World Champion
- Events: X Games, Crankworx, Red Bull Rampage, Red Bull Joyride

Brett Rheeder (born February 16, 1993) is a professional freeride mountain bike rider from Mount Albert, Ontario. Rheeder is an X-Games athlete and gold medalist winner of the 2013 Munich Slopestyle Mountain Bike event. He is often regarded as the greatest slopestyle rider in mountain biking. Rheeder is a 4x FMB World Tour Champion, the most in event history. He's also a x7 Crankworx event champion, which includes his 2016 Red Bull Joyride win.

== Career ==
In 2013, he won the first gold medal in Slopestyle at the X-Games in Munich, and in 2013 and 2014 he won the Vienna Air King. In 2014, he won the Bearclaw Invitational and came second at Red Bull Joyride in Whistler and Red Bull District Ride in Nuremberg. In 2015, he won the Munich Mash, and won the first two events in the Crankworx World Tour in Rotorua, New Zealand and Les Deux Alpes, France. In 2016, he won Red Bull Joyride in Whistler and in 2017 he won Crankworx Les Gets and came second at Crankworx Innsbruck. In 2018, he won Crankworx Rotorua and Red Bull Rampage on October 26, 2018, after five Rampages, as well as coming second at Red Bull Joyride and Crankworx Les Gets and Innsbruck. In 2019, he won at Crankworx Rotorua for a record third time and also won at Innsbruck, as well as placing second at Red Bull Joyride in Whistler and Red Bull Rampage. In October 2022 he placed first in Red Bull Rampage

With Brandon Semenuk, Rheeder was part of the Trek C3 Project, which came first in the Freeride Mountain Bike Factory Team Rankings in 2014, 2015 and 2017. In January 2022 it was announced that Brett Rheeder and Trek part ways. Later that year it became public that his new bike sponsor is Commencal Bicycles. In January 2023, Rheeder announced he was retiring from competitions, "focusing time on progressing [his] riding in new ways, creating new media, having fun with social media, and ... helping develop the next generation of slopestyle and freeride as a whole; its courses, its athletes, its training grounds, its products."

== Personal life ==
Rheeder is from Mount Albert, Ontario. He originally played hockey, then switched first to cross-country cycling and then to slopestyle.

In 2020, Rheeder announced that he would be temporarily stepping away from the Crankworx Freeride Mountain Bike World Tour. In an Instagram post Rheeder cited that regaining his creativity in slopestyle riding and stepping back from the stresses and injuries associated with competition would be the best option to preserve the longevity of his career.

== Sponsors ==
Rheeder's bike sponsor is Commencal. His other sponsors include Kenda tires, Clif bar, Shimano, cbdMD, and Smith Optics.
