= Red Bull Rampage =

Mountain bike competition

Red Bull Rampage logo (2025)

The Red Bull Rampage is an invitation-only freeride mountain bike competition held near Zion National Park in Virgin, Utah, United States, just to the north of Gooseberry Mesa. From 2001 until 2004, it was held off the Kolob Terrace Road, on the western boundary of Zion National Park.

== History ==
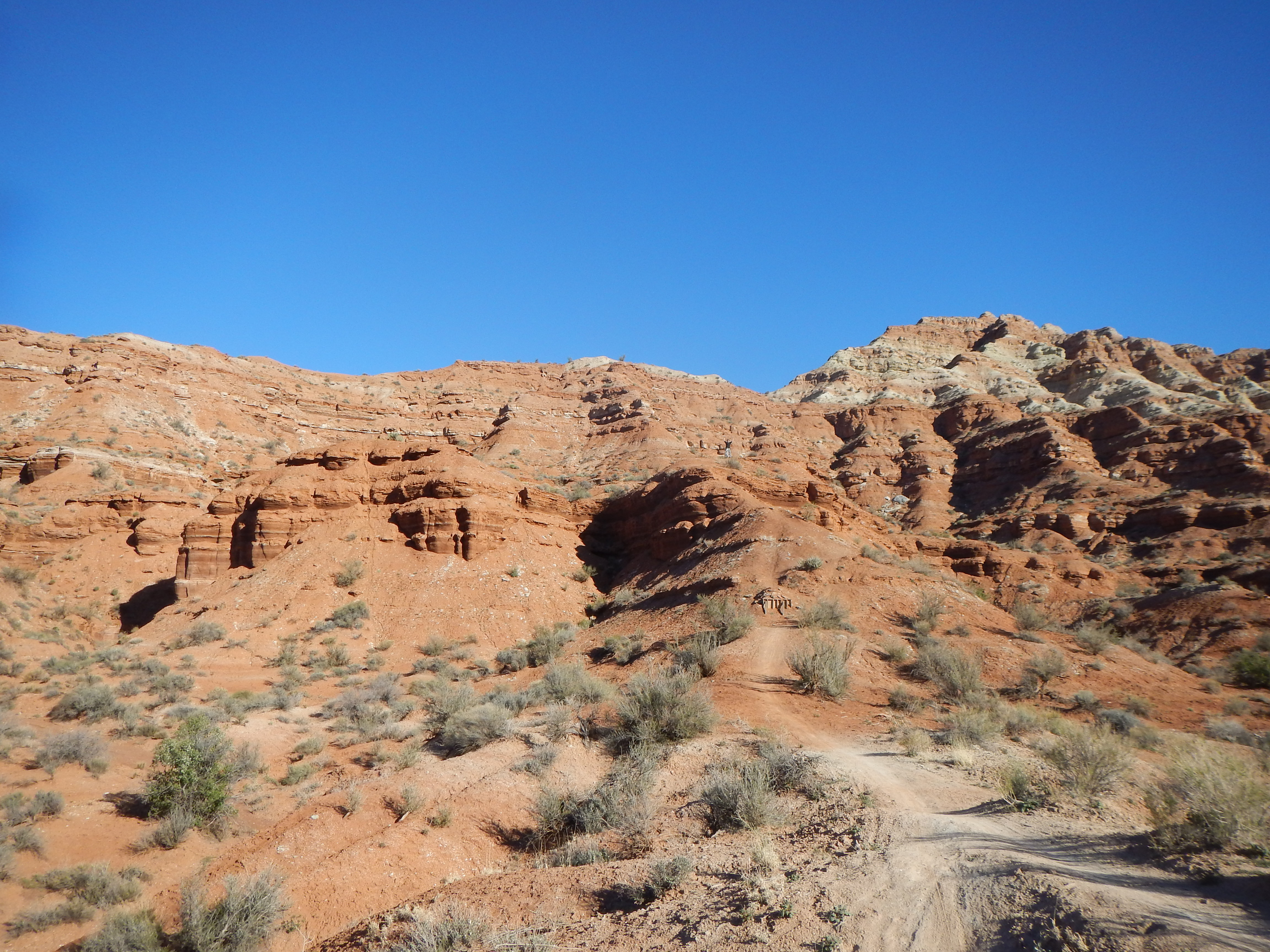
Old Red Bull Rampage Course, part of the mountain used in Virgin, Utah

The competition took place from 2001 until 2004. However, by 2005 the organizers put the event on hold to try to find a new venue. After a three-year hiatus, Rampage returned in 2008 at a new venue. The organizers introduced wooden features for the 2008 event. Previously, the competition took place on a natural piste, meaning it was devoid of manmade features.

The event usually occurs in October. Its format is similar to freestyle skiing and freestyle snowboarding, where competitors are judged on their choice of lines down the hill, their technical ability and the complexity and amplitude of tricks. Since its inception, Red Bull Rampage has become the super bowl of Freeride MTB.

At the first ever Rampage in 2001, the prize money for the event was $8,000. In 2025, first place takes home $250,000 and a Ford Ranger Raptor. This makes Rampage the most lucrative MTB event.

In 2024, women were invited to compete at Rampage for the first time.

== Results ==
=== 2026 Women ===
Date: 8 October 2026

Pl.	Rider	Score
1	(New Zealand) Robin Goomes	93.50
2	(United States) Hannah Bergemann	92.75
3	(Canada) Kirsten Van Horne	86.50
4	(New Zealand) Vinny Armstrong	82.75
5	(Australia) Harriet Burbidge-Smith	82.51
6	(United States) Chelsea Kimball	81.87
7	(Scotland) Mikayla Parton	81.75
8	(Canada) Georgia Astle	80.37
9	(Canada) Casey Brown	76.00
10	(United States) Janelle Soukup	73.50

- People's Choice Award: Robin Goomes
- Anker Moment of the Day: Chelsea Kimball
- Utah Sports Commission Best Trick Award: Robin Goomes - Flat spin
- BFGoodrich Tires Toughness Award: Hannah Bergemann
- Cat Compact Digger Award: Georgia Astle's Team - Jacob Tooke Jarrod Anderson
- Oakley Meta Style Award: Vinny Armstrong
- Kelly McGarry 'McGazza' Spirit Award: Janelle Soukup

=== 2025 Men ===
Date: 19 October 2025

Pl.	Rider	Score
1	(Canada) Hayden Zablotny	96.00
2	(Belgium) Thomas Genon	94.35
3	(Canada) Tom Van Steenbergen	94.00
4	(France) Tomas Lemoine	93.66
5	(United States) Reed Boggs	90.33
6	(United States) Talus Turk	88.50
7	(United States) Cam Zink	87.00
8	(United States) Finley Kirschenmann	85.90
9	(Sweden) Emil Johansson	85.50
10	(United Kingdom) Tom Isted	85.33
11	(United States) Carson Storch	85.25
12	(United States) Jaxson Riddle	84.50
13	(United States) Luke Whitlock	69.00
14	(Spain) Bienve Aguado Alba	DNF
15	(United States) Dylan Stark	DNF
16	(Spain) Adolf Silva	DNF
17	(Poland) Szymon Godziek	DNF

- GoPro Moment: Jaxson Riddle
- Best Trick: Jaxson Riddle – Backflip Heel Clicker
- Toughness Award: Adolf Silva
- Digger Award: Team Hayden Zablotny – Dakoda Osusky & Harper Simon
- Kelly McGarry 'McGazza' Spirit Award: Aiden Parish

=== 2025 Women ===
Date: 17 October 2025

Pl.	Rider	Score
1	(New Zealand) Robin Goomes	89.50
2	(United States) Hannah Bergemann	89.33
3	(Canada) Georgia Astle	87.66
4	(Argentina) Cami Nogueira	87.33
5	(Canada) Kirsten Van Horne	84.50
6	(New Zealand) Vinny Armstrong	80.00
7	(United States) Janelle Soukup	75.66

- GoPro Moment: Cami Nogueira
- Best Trick: Kirsten Van Horne - Suicide No Hander Drop
- Toughness Award: Cami Nogueira
- Digger Award: Team Chelsea Kimball - Aric Duncan & Ryan Rodriguez
- Kelly McGarry 'McGazza' Spirit Award: Hannah Bergemann

=== 2024 ===
Date: 10-12 October 2024

Pl.	Rider	Score
1	(Canada) Brandon Semenuk	92.73
2	(Poland) Szymon Godziek	91.66
3	(United States) Tyler McCaul	90.66
4	(Canada) Tom Van Steenbergen	89.33
5	(Canada) Kurt Sorge	87.16
6	(Belgium) Thomas Genon	85.83
7	(United States) Carson Storch	85.00
8	(Spain) Adolf Silva	83.50
9	(United States) Ethan Nell	82.33
10	(United States) Kyle Strait	78.66
11	(United Kingdom) Brendan Fairclough	76.00
12	(United States) Reed Boggs	74.66
13	(United States) Talus Turk	72.00
14	(United States) Luke Whitlock	70.66
15	(United Kingdom) Tom Isted	50.53
16	(Spain) Bienvenido Aguado Alba	DNF
17	(United States) Cameron Zink	DNF

- Best Trick Award: Tom Van Steenbergen (front flip)
- Samsung Trailblazer Award: Brendan Fairclough
- BFGoodrich Toughness Award: Bienvenido Aguado Alba
- Kelly McGarry 'McGazza' Spirit Award: Ethan Nell
- DECKED Digger Award: team of Brandon Semenuk

=== 2023 ===
Date: 13 October 2023

Pl.	Rider	Score
1	(United States) Cameron Zink	95.00
2	(Canada) Tom Van Steenbergen	89.00
3	(United States) Carson Storch	87.00
4	(United Kingdom) Brendan Fairclough	86.66
5	(United States) Talus Turk	84.00
6	(United States) Kyle Strait	83.58
7	(Sweden) Emil Johansson	82.83
8	(Spain) Bienvenido Aguado Alba	79.44
9	(Belgium) Thomas Genon	77.41
10	(United States) Reed Boggs	76.731
11	(United States) DJ Brandt	73.51
12	(Canada) Alex Volokhov	72.00
13	(Canada) Kurt Sorge	69.66
14	(United States) Jaxson Riddle	68.00
15	(Spain) Adolf Silva	51.33
16	(Poland) Szymon Godziek	dnf
17	(Austria) Clemens Kaudela	dnf

- Kelly McGarry Spirit Award: Bienvenido Aguado Alba
- Best Style Award: Emil Johansson
- Best Digger Award: Reed Boggs' team of Caleb Holonko and Alan Mandel
- Best trick: Bienvenido Aguado Alba for the front flip canyon gap
- Toughness Award: Kyle Strait
- People's choice: Bienvenido Aguado Alba

=== 2022 ===
Date: 21 October 2022

Pl.	Rider	Score
1	(Canada) Brett Rheeder	90.66
2	(Poland) Szymon Godziek	86.33
3	(Canada) Brandon Semenuk	84.00
4	(United States) Reed Boggs	82.66
5	(Belgium) Thomas Genon	81.00
6	(United States) Carson Storch	77.00
7	(Canada) Kurt Sorge	74.00
8	(Spain) Andreu Lacondeguy	73.00
9	(United States) Jaxson Riddle	67.00
10	(United States) Cameron Zink	66.00
11	(United States) Ethan Nell	65.33
12	(Canada) Tom van Steenbergen	63.66
13	(United States) DJ Brandt	62.33
14	(France) William Robert	58.00
15	(United States) Dylan Stark	53.00
16	(United States) Tyler McCaul	37.66

- Kelly McGarry Spirit Award: Tom van Steenbergen
- Best Style Award: Jaxson Riddle
- Best Digger Award: Brett Rheeder (team of Phil Mclean and Austin Davignon)
- Best trick: Brandon Semenuk (acid drop start)
- Toughness Award: Cameron Zink

=== 2021 ===
Date: 15 October 2021

Pl.	Rider	Score
1	(Canada) Brandon Semenuk	89.00
2	(Canada) Kurt Sorge	88.33
3	(United States) Reed Boggs	87.00
4	(United States) Cameron Zink	86.33
5	(United States) Tyler McCaul	78.33
6	(United States) Kyle Strait	77.66
7	(Belgium) Thomas Genon	77.00
8	(United States) Ethan Nell	73.33
9	(United States) Jaxson Riddle	72.66
10	(Poland) Szymon Godziek	54.33
11	(Canada) Tom van Steenbergen	00.00
11	(France) Vincent Tupin	00.00

- Kelly McGarry Spirit Award: Brage Vestavik
- Best Style Award: Jaxson Riddle
- Best Digger Award: Jaxson Riddle and his team
- Best trick: Tom van Steenbergen (flat drop frontflip)
- Toughness Award: Cameron Zink

=== 2019 ===
Dates: 22–25 October 2019

Pl.	Rider	Score
1	(Canada) Brandon Semenuk	92.33
2	(Canada) Brett Rheeder	91.00
3	(Canada) Tom van Steenbergen	89.66
4	(United Kingdom) Brendan Fairclough	87.66
5	(United States) Tyler McCaul	87.00
6	(Poland) Szymon Godziek	86.66
7	(United States) Ethan Nell	86.00
8	(United States) Carson Storch	85.66
9	(United States) Kyle Strait	83.33
10	(France) Vincent Tupin	81.33
11	(United States) Reed Boggs	80.00
12	(Sweden) Emil Johansson	79.00
13	(Canada) Graham Agassiz	76.33
14	(Belgium) Thomas Genon	74.00
15	(Canada) Reece Wallace	72.00
16	(United States) DJ Brandt	70.33
17	(Spain) Andreu Lacondeguy	52.33
18	(Canada) Kurt Sorge	51.66
19	(Spain) Bienvenido Aguado Alba	45.33
20	(United States) Cameron Zink	36.66

- People's Choice Award: Szymon Godziek
- Kelly McGarry Spirit Award: Tyler McCaul
- Best trick: Brett Rheeder (can-can backflip)

=== 2018 ===
Dates: 23–26 October 2018

Pl.	Rider	Score
1	(Canada) Brett Rheeder	89.66
2	(Spain) Andreu Lacondeguy	87.33
3	(United States) Ethan Nell	86.33
4	(Canada) Tom van Steenbergen	84.66
5	(Belgium) Thomas Genon	83.33
6	(United States) Tyler McCaul	82.00
7	(United States) Kyle Strait	80.33
8	(Poland) Szymon Godziek	75.00
9	(Canada) Kurt Sorge	74.00
10	(United Kingdom) Brendan Fairclough	67.66
11	(Spain) Adolf Silva	64.33
12	(France) Vincent Tupin	63.00
13	(United States) Reed Boggs	59.66
14	(France) Rémy Métailler	55.66
15	(Canada) Graham Agassiz	50.00
16	(Canada) Brandon Semenuk	36.00
17	(United States) DJ Brandt	33.33
18	(United States) Carson Storch	00.00
18	(Canada) Jordie Lunn	00.00

- People's Choice Award: Adolf Silva
- Kelly McGarry Spirit Award: Brendan Fairclough
- Best trick: Tom van Steenbergen (flat drop backflip)
- Cameron Zink and Bas van Steenbergen withdrew before the start.

=== 2017 ===
Dates: 26–27 October 2017

Pl.	Rider	Score
1	(Canada) Kurt Sorge	92.66
2	(United States) Cameron Zink	90.33
3	(United States) Ethan Nell	90.00
4	(Canada) Brandon Semenuk	89.66
5	(Canada) Brett Rheeder	89.33
6	(Belgium) Thomas Genon	89.00
7	(United States) Carson Storch	87.66
8	(United States) Kyle Strait	87.33
9	(United States) Tyler McCaul	87.00
10	(Canada) Tom van Steenbergen	84.33
11	(Spain) Andreu Lacondeguy	83.00
12	(France) Antoine Bizet	81.66
13	(Canada) Darren Berrecloth	81.00
14	(France) Vincent Tupin	78.00
15	(France) Pierre Edouard Ferry	76.33
16	(United States) Logan Binggeli	69.66
17	(Canada) Bas van Steenbergen	68.66
18	(United States) Ryan Howard	67.66

- People's Choice Award: Antoine Bizet (44% votes)
- Kelly McGarry Spirit Award: Pierre-Edouard Ferry

=== 2016 ===
Dates: 12–14 October 2016

Pl.	Rider	Score
1	(Canada) Brandon Semenuk	84.33
2	(France) Antoine Bizet	81.00
3	(United States) Carson Storch	79.00
4	(Canada) Kurt Sorge	78.66
5	(United States) Kyle Strait	78.33
6	(Belgium) Thomas Genon	77.66
7	(United States) Tyler McCaul	76.00
8	(Spain) Andreu Lacondeguy	75.33
9	(France) Pierre-Edouard Ferry	74.33
10	(Canada) Tom Van Steenbergen	73.33
11	(Canada) Darren Berrecloth	70.66
12	(France) Rémy Métailler	66.33
13	(Canada) Kyle Norbraten	62.66
14	(Canada) James Doerfling	60.33
15	(Canada) Brett Rheeder	54.00
16	(Canada) Graham Agassiz	50.66
17	(United States) Cameron Zink	47.33
18	(New Zealand) Conor MacFarlane	43.33

- People's Choice Award: Brandon Semenuk
- Kelly McGarry Spirit Award: Conor Macfarlane
- Best trick: Carson Storch (step down 360 drop)
- First double backflip in event history: Antoine Bizet
- Prize fund: $200,000.

=== 2015 ===
Dates: 15–16 October 2015

Pl.	Rider	Score
1	(Canada) Kurt Sorge	96.50
2	(Spain) Andreu Lacondeguy	95.75
3	(Canada) Graham Agassiz	94.75
4	(Canada) Brandon Semenuk	94.25
5	(Belgium) Thomas Genon	91.25
6	(United States) Cameron Zink	89.25
7	(Canada) Darren Berrecloth	87.00
8	(United Kingdom) Brendan Fairclough	85.50
9	(United Kingdom) Sam Reynolds	83.00
10	(France) Rémy Métailler	82.50
11	(United States) Kyle Strait	82.00
12	(France) Pierre-Edouard Ferry	81.75
13	(Canada) Brett Rheeder	81.50
14	(Canada) Kyle Norbraten	80.50
15	(United States) Logan Binggeli	75.50
16	(Canada) Bas van Steenbergen	70.50
17	(United States) Ryan Howard	66.75
18	(Canada) Mitch Chubey	63.25
19	(New Zealand) Kelly McGarry	62.25
20	(United States) Paul Basagoitia	0.00
20	(France) Antoine Bizet	0.00

- People's Choice Award: Brandon Semenuk (25% votes)
- Best trick: Sam Reynolds (Superman over the Canyon Gap)
- Prize fund: $100,000.

=== 2014 ===
Dates: 29–30 September 2014

Pl.	Rider	Score
1	(Spain) Andreu Lacondeguy	95.25
2	(United States) Cameron Zink	89.50
3	(Canada) Brandon Semenuk	89.25
4	(United States) Kyle Strait	89.00
5	(Canada) Brett Rheeder	88.50
6	(Canada) Kyle Norbraten	82.75
7	(United States) Jeff Herbertson	82.50
8	(United Kingdom) Brendan Fairclough	77.25
9	(United States) Paul Basagoitia	76.50
10	(Canada) Mitch Chubey	76.25
11	(Poland) Szymon Godziek	76.00
12	(New Zealand) Kelly McGarry	73.25
13	(Belgium) Thomas Genon	71.50
14	(France) Louis Reboul	70.75
15	(United States) Carson Storch	69.25
16	(France) Pierre-Edouard Ferry	67.50
17	(Canada) Geoff Gulevich	66.00
18	(Switzerland) Ramon Hunziker	37.75
19	(Canada) Tom van Steenbergen	35.00
20	(United States) Mike Montgomery	24.00

- Best trick: Cameron Zink (360 drop)
- Prize fund: $75,000.

=== 2013 ===
Dates: 11–13 October 2013

Pl.	Rider	Score
1	(United States) Kyle Strait	87.50
2	(New Zealand) Kelly McGarry	86.75
3	(United States) Cameron Zink	84.75
4	(Spain) Andreu Lacondeguy	84.25
5	(United States) Tyler McCaul	80.50
6	(France) Pierre-Edouard Ferry	76.50
7	(United States) Cameron McCaul	75.75
8	(United Kingdom) Brendan Fairclough	75.50
9	(Canada) Garett Buehler	74.50
10	(Belgium) Thomas Genon	72.50
11	(Switzerland) Ramon Hunziker	71.50
12	(United States) Mike Montgomery	66.75
13	(United States) Logan Binggeli	66.25
14	(United States) Wil White	64.75
15	(Canada) Geoff Gulevich	64.25
16	(Belgium) Nico Vink	63.75
17	(Canada) Graham Agassiz	56.25
18	(Canada) Kyle Norbraten	53.75
19	(Canada) Brendan Howey	52.00
20	(Canada) Mike Hopkins	0.00
20	(Canada) Brandon Semenuk	0.00
20	(Canada) James Doerfling	0.00
20	(France) Antoine Bizet	0.00
20	(United States) Paul Basagoitia	0.00
20	(Canada) Mitch Chubey	0.00

- Best trick: Cameron Zink
- Prize fund: $55,000.

=== 2012 ===
Dates: 5–7 October 2012

Pl.	Rider	Score
1	(Canada) Kurt Sorge	86.75
2	(France) Antoine Bizet	79.00
3	(United States) Logan Binggeli	78.50
4	(Spain) Andreu Lacondeguy	74.00
5	(United States) Tyler McCaul	71.00
6	(Canada) James Doerfling	70.50
7	(United States) Cameron McCaul	70.00
8	(Canada) Thomas Vanderham	68.25
9	(United States) Kyle Strait	65.75
10	(Canada) Kyle Norbraten	65.25
11	(Canada) Geoff Gulevich	65.00
12	(United States) Wil White	64.50
13	(Belgium) Nico Vink	63.50
14	(Canada) Brandon Semenuk	63.25
15	(Sweden) Martin Söderström	63.00
16	(Switzerland) Ramon Hunziker	62.50
17	(Canada) Brett Rheeder	58.25
18	(France) Pierre-Edouard Ferry	56.50
19	(Canada) Darren Berrecloth	55.50
20	(Canada) Brendan Howey	41.75

- Prize fund: $40,000.

=== 2010 ===
Dates: 1–3 October 2010

Pl.	Rider	Score
1	(United States) Cameron Zink	89.2
2	(United Kingdom) Gee Atherton	82.4
3	(Canada) Darren Berrecloth	81.2
4	(Spain) Andreu Lacondeguy	79.0
5	(Canada) Geoff Gulevich	77.2
6	(Canada) Thomas Vanderham	76.6
7	(Canada) Robbie Bourdon	76.0
8	(United States) Kyle Strait	75.6
9	(United States) Logan Binggeli	74.8
10	(Canada) Kurt Sorge	73.0
11	(Canada) Alex Prochazka	72.2
12	(United States) Tyler McCaul	71.8
13	(Canada) Graham Agassiz	71.0
14	(France) Cédric Gracia	70.4
15	(United States) Greg Watts	65.6
16	(Czech Republic) Michal Maroši	64.2
17	(United States) Jamie Goldman	63.8
18	(Canada) Curtis Robinson	62.4
19	(Canada) Mike Hopkins	0.0
19	(United States) Chris Van Dine	0.0
19	(Canada) James Doerfling	0.0

- Prize fund: $25,000.

=== 2008 ===
Dates: 5–6 October 2008

Pl.	Rider	Score
1	(Canada) Brandon Semenuk	82.2
2	(Canada) Kurt Sorge	79.6
3	(Canada) Thomas Vanderham	77.6
4	(Canada) Mike Kinrade	76.0
5	(United States) Cameron Zink	73.6
6	(Canada) Mike Hopkins	73.4
7	(France) Cédric Gracia	66.6
8	(Canada) Graham Agassiz	65.0
9	(United States) Kyle Strait	59.8
10	(Canada) Darren Berrecloth	55.2
11	(Canada) Robbie Bourdon	54.2
12	(United States) Paul Basagoitia	52.4
13	(United States) Cameron McCaul	0.0
13	(Czech Republic) Michal Maroši	0.0
13	(United Kingdom) Gee Atherton	0.0

- Prize fund: $20,000.

=== 2004 ===
Dates: 30–31 October 2004

Pl.	Rider	Score
1	(United States) Kyle Strait	85.8
2	(United Kingdom) Gee Atherton	83.8
3	(Canada) Steve Romaniuk	79.8
4	(Canada) Thomas Vanderham	79.4
5	(United States) Lance Canfield	78.0
6	(United Kingdom) Ben Reid	70.4
7	(United States) Cameron Zink	69.6
8	(Republic of Ireland) Glyn O'Brien	67.6
9	(Canada) Mike Kinrade	67.4
10	(Canada) Wade Simmons	64.0
11	(Germany) Guido Tschugg	63.8
12	(Canada) Matt Hunter	56.2

- Prize fund: $15,000.

=== 2003 ===
Dates: 16–19 October 2003

Pl.	Rider	Score
1	(France) Cédric Gracia	88.8
2	(Canada) Andrew Shandro	84.8
3	(Republic of Ireland) Glyn O'Brien	79.4
4	(Czech Republic) Michal Maroši	77.6
5	(Canada) Steve Romaniuk	77.2
6	(Canada) Thomas Vanderham	76.4
7	(South Africa) Greg Minnaar	76.2
8	(Canada) Mike Kinrade	73.6
9	(United States) Greg Smith	70.2
10	(Canada) Kyle Richey	70.2
11	(Canada) Richie Schley	60.4
12	(Canada) Joe Schwartz	0.0

- Prize fund: $12,000.

=== 2002 ===
Dates: 12–13 October 2002

Pl.	Rider	Score
1	(Canada) Tyler Klassen	79.6
2	(France) Cédric Gracia	76.2
3	(Canada) Darren Berrecloth	75.4
4	(Canada) Shaums March	75.0
5	(Canada) Dave Watson	73.0
6	(United States) Kyle Strait	72.2
7	(Canada) Richey Schley	71.4
8	(United States) Lance Canfield	70.8
9	(Canada) Thomas Vanderham	66.4
10	(Canada) Robbie Bourdon	63.2
11	(Australia) Andrew Mills	61.4
12	(United States) Chris O'Driscoll	59.4

- There were 28 riders in the start list.
- Prize fund: $10,000.

=== 2001 ===
Dates: 20–21 October 2001

Pl.	Rider	Score
1	(Canada) Wade Simmons	78.4
2	(United States) Greg Smith	76.4
3	(Canada) Robbie Bourdon	74.4
4	(United States) Chris O'Driscoll	73.2
5	(Canada) Mike Kinrade	73.2
6	(United States) Randy Spangler	66.4
7	(Canada) Thomas Vanderham	66.0
8	(Canada) Dave Watson	63.2
9	(United States) Kyle Strait	56.8
10	(Canada) Gareth Dyer	55.2

- There were 22 riders in the start list. Twelve of them advanced to the final, including Myles Rockwell.
- Best trick: Kyle Strait ($500 prize).
- Prize fund: $8,000.

== Statistics ==
Pl.	Rider	Winner	Runner-up	Third place	Top 3 total	Winning years	Runner-up years	Third place years
1	(Canada) Brandon Semenuk	5	0	2	7	2008, 2016, 2019, 2021, 2024	–	2014, 2022
2	(Canada) Kurt Sorge	3	2	0	5	2012, 2015, 2017	2008, 2021	–
3	(United States) Cameron Zink	2	2	1	5	2010, 2023	2014, 2017	2013
4	(Canada) Brett Rheeder	2	1	0	3	2018, 2022	2019	–
5	(United States) Kyle Strait	2	0	0	2	2004, 2013	–	–
6	(Spain) Andreu Lacondeguy	1	2	0	3	2014	2015, 2018	–
7	(France) Cédric Gracia	1	1	0	2	2003	2002	–
8	(Canada) Wade Simmons	1	0	0	1	2001	–	–
8	(Canada) Tyler Klassen	1	0	0	1	2002	–	–
10	(United Kingdom) Gee Atherton	0	2	0	2	–	2004, 2010	–
10	(France) Antoine Bizet	0	2	0	2	–	2012, 2016	–
10	(Poland) Szymon Godziek	0	2	0	2	–	2022, 2024	–
13	(United States) Greg Smith	0	1	0	1	–	2001	–
13	(Canada) Andrew Shandro	0	1	0	1	–	2003	–
13	(New Zealand) Kelly McGarry	0	1	0	1	–	2013	–
16	(Canada) Darren Berrecloth	0	0	2	2	–	–	2002, 2010
16	(United States) Ethan Nell	0	0	2	2	–	–	2017, 2018
18	(Canada) Robbie Bourdon	0	0	1	1	–	–	2001
18	(Republic of Ireland) Glyn O'Brien	0	0	1	1	–	–	2003
18	(Canada) Steve Romaniuk	0	0	1	1	–	–	2004
18	(Canada) Thomas Vanderham	0	0	1	1	–	–	2008
18	(United States) Logan Binggeli	0	0	1	1	–	–	2012
18	(Canada) Graham Agassiz	0	0	1	1	–	–	2015
18	(United States) Carson Storch	0	0	1	1	–	–	2016
18	(Canada) Tom van Steenbergen	0	0	1	1	–	–	2019
18	(United States) Reed Boggs	0	0	1	1	–	–	2021
Total		16	16	16	48	Total: 16 editions		
