= Kyle Strait =

American freeride mountain biker

Kyle Strait (born April 4, 1987) is an American freeride slopestyle mountain biker from Alpine, California. He began racing in 2000 on the Monterey peninsula at the age of 12. He participated in the first edition of Rampage in 2001 at the age of 14, won the contest in 2004 and again in 2013. He is the youngest Rampage winner ever. As of 2023 Strait is the only rider to have participated in every edition of Red Bull Rampage. In 2022, he was unable to complete a run after breaking 3 vertebra in a practice session. Less than a year later, Strait was able to compete in Red Bull Hardline, and competed in Rampage again in 2023.

Since 2022, Strait has co-hosted the Strait Acres Invitational, a gravity biking and dual-slalom racing festival at Big Bear Lake, California.

In 2022 Strait built the Dual slalom track for the Sea Otter Classic. The Laguna Seca course had not been revamped since 2002. With hand tools and a crew of four using only native dirt, the course was completely rebuilt in 11 days.

== Achievements ==
- In 2001, at age 13, Strait won the (adult) Pro Dirt Jumping contest at the Sea Otter Classic.
- In 2004, Strait won the Red Bull Rampage competition, and placed third in the slopestyle category at Crankworx, and won the bronze medal for the junior men's downhill at the 2004 UCI Mountain Bike & Trials World Championships
- In 2006 he placed third in the slopestyle category at Crankworx.
- In 2013, he became the first person to win Rampage twice.
- In 2012, he won Sea Otter Dual Slalom, along with Jill Kintner.
- In 2023, Strait placed sixth and won the BFGoodrich Tires Toughness Award at Red Bull Rampage.

== Personal life ==
Kyle is married to Rachel Throop Strait, a Cyclo-cross and enduro mountain bike racer who was the 2006 junior national cross-country champion.

== See also ==
Results at Roots and Rain Strait Acres
