= Sam Reynolds (cyclist) =

British Mountain Biker

Personal information
- Born: 4 June 1991 (age 35) Cuckfield, West Sussex, England
- Height: 6 ft 1 in (1.85 m)
- Weight: 176 lb (80 kg)

Cycling career
- Sport: Cycling
- Current team: IXS
- Discipline: Freestyle Mountain Bikes
- Role: Freestyle
- Rider type: Slopestyle, Dirt, Freeride, Downhill

Sam Reynolds (born 4 June 1991 in Cuckfield, West Sussex England) is a Professional freeride Mountain biker. Known for his Best Trick award in 2015 Red Bull Rampage event when he did a superman over a 72'ft Canyon Gap. He also later performed a trick the "rock solid" in the same event.

== Sponsors ==
Current Bike Sponsor, Polygon Bikes, Monster Energy

== Achievement ==
2013

- Won 2 FMB Contest
- 4th Stuttgart Bike Fest
- 3rd at Crankworx L2A 2014
- 5th at Leogang 26trix
- 7th overall FMB
- 5th City 8 Quebec

2014

- 1st Whitestyle
- 3rd 26trix
- 2nd Vienna air king
- 2nd Adidas ride the sky
- 1st Jack gear invitational
- 2nd Bergline
- 3rd Crankworx Europe
- 1st Night harvest
