= Wade Simmons =

Canadian racing cyclist

Wade Simmons (born 20 September 1973) is a mountain biker from Kamloops, British Columbia, Canada who has won the Red Bull Rampage Utah 2001 and placed second in the same year in the Red Bull Rampage Australia. He is currently on the Rocky Mountain Bicycles factory team.

Simmons is affectionately known as one of the Godfathers of Freeride mountain biking along with Brett Tippie and Richie Schley, and was one of the first freeriders to become sponsored. Wade, along with Tippie and Schley were inducted into the Mountain Bike Hall of Fame in September 2010.

== Career highlights ==
- Top 10 at all Red Bull Rampage events, 4th 2004
- 2nd Monster Park 2004
- 6th in 7th Red Bull Ride
- King of the Mountain Overall, Whistler 2003
- National Team Member 2000
