= Darren Berrecloth =

Canadian mountain biker

Personal information
- Nickname: The Claw
- Nationality: Canada
- Born: October 30, 1981 (age 44) Parksville, British Columbia, Canada
- Height: 5'9 ft
- Weight: 182 lb (83 kg)
- Website: http://darrenberrecloth.com/

Sport
- Sport: Freeride Mountain Bike
- Event(s): X Games, Gravity Games, Crankworx, Red Bull Rampage, Red Bull Joyride

Darren Berrecloth (born October 30, 1981), nicknamed "The Claw", is a Canadian professional freeride mountain bike rider. Born in Parksville, British Columbia, Berrecloth is famous not only for his success in competitions, but also as one of the pioneers to the sport of freeride. He appeared in the freeride scene with a third-place finish at the 2002 Red Bull Rampage, and is one of the most prominent exponents of the discipline.

== Career ==
He went pro when he was 20, in 2001 he competed in Dirt BMX Gravity Games placing 8th overall. and would become a pioneer of Slopestyle; in 2005 he placed 2nd in Crankworx Slopestyle in Whistler.

In 2010, he placed third receiving bronze in Red Bull Rampage.

In 2013, X Games Munich had its first Slopestyle Mountain Bike event. Darren would place 5th out of the initial 16 riders in prequalifiers round. In the finals he placed 4th overall.

He hosted the Bearclaw Invitational on Mt. Washington until putting it on hiatus after the last competition in 2014, a year when he had many injuries. He broke his back in 2011 and had spinal surgery in 2014. As of October 2015 he is part of the Canyon Factory Freeride Team.
