= Matt Hunter (mountain biker) =

Canadian mountain biker

Personal information
- Born: 12 July 1983 (age 43) Kamloops, British Columbia, Canada

Cycling career
- Sport: Cycling
- Discipline: mountain biker

Matt Hunter (born 12 July 1983) is a Canadian professional mountain biker. Matt Hunter's professional career began when he won the 2003 "Ultimate Freeride Challenge".

Instead of participating in contests or races, Matt Hunter focuses on shooting movies and photos of his rides. Two of the most popular movies in which he appears are named "Follow Me" and "Seasons".
