= Kurt Sorge =

Canadian cyclist

Personal information
- Born: 4 June 1988 (age 38) Nelson, British Columbia Canada
- Height: 5 ft 10 in (1.78 m)
- Weight: 135 lb (61 kg)

Cycling career
- Sport: Cycling
- Current team: Fox Racing
- Role: Freestyle
- Rider type: Slopestyle, Freeride
Medal record
Competition
Gold medal – first place	Red Bull Rampage 2017	Freeride
Gold medal – first place	Red Bull Rampage 2015	Freeride
Gold medal – first place	Red Bull Rampage 2012	Freeride
Silver medal – second place	Red Bull Rampage 2021	Freeride
Silver medal – second place	Red Bull Rampage 2008	Freeride

Kurt Sorge is a freeride mountain biker from Nelson, British Columbia, Canada, born on 28 November 1988.

== Career ==
His major results include first place in the 2012, 2015, and 2017 Red Bull Rampage in Virgin, Utah, and placed second in 2008 and most recently 2021 Red Bull Rampage. He also placed 3rd in the 2011 Chatel Mountain style.
