= Cameron Zink =

American mountain biker

Personal information
- Born: 8 March 1986 (age 40) Aptos, California, U.S.

Cycling career
- Sport: Cycling
- Current team: Devinci
- Discipline: Freeride
- Role: Freestyle
- Rider type: Freeride, Slopestyle, Dirt jumping
Medal record
Competition
Gold medal – first place	Red Bull Rampage 2023	Freeride
Gold medal – first place	Red Bull Joyride 2010	Slopestyle
Gold medal – first place	Red Bull Rampage 2010	Freeride
Gold medal – first place	Red Bull Joyride 2006	Slopestyle
Silver medal – second place	Red Bull Joyride 2011	Slopestyle
Silver medal – second place	Red Bull Joyride 2007	Slopestyle
Silver medal – second place	Red Bull Joyride 2005	Slopestyle
Silver medal – second place	Red Bull Rampage 2017	Freeride
Silver medal – second place	Red Bull Rampage 2014	Freeride
Bronze medal – third place	X Games Real MTB 2021	MTB
Bronze medal – third place	Red Bull Rampage 2013	Freeride

Cameron "Cam" Zink (born March 8, 1986) is an American professional freeride mountain bike rider and X Games athlete, known as a pioneer of the freeride mountain bike discipline.

== Personal life ==
Zink is from Carson City, Nevada. He started mountain biking at age 9 and when he was 16 won the junior national championship in dual slalom. He was signed by the Santa Cruz Syndicate team when he was 17. Until he was 20, he continued to race while also competing in Slopestyle.

== Career ==
In 2009 Zink founded Sensus, a company that manufactures bike grips.

In 2010 he won Red Bull Rampage and was awarded best trick for an almost 40-foot 360 drop, and also won the FMB World Tour season title. In 2013 he won best trick for a 78-foot backflip, after having been forbidden by a doctor to ride. In 2013 he finished 4th Overall in Munich X-Games Slopestyle event. In 2014 he placed 2nd in Red Bull Rampage and won best trick with the biggest 360 in history of the event.

On August 21, 2014, Mammoth Mountain at World of X-Games, he set the world record for the farthest backflip on a bicycle with a 100-foot, 3 inch flip. In 2006 and 2010 he won Crankworx Slopestyle (now Joyride) in Whistler, British Columbia.

In 2020, Cam founded Milepost 35 Mountain Bike Camp at Mt. Hood, Oregon with, We Are Camp, LLC, the parent Company of High Cascade Snowboard Camp, and Windells Ski Camp. Zink's 501c3 nonprofit, "Sensus Rad Trails" designs and builds the camp's private bike park while each summer campers can ride and learn from him during his Signature Session with Sensus.

In April 2021, X-Games would bring back mountain biking this time to a REAL series format. Zink's video submission would be enough to win his first X-Games medal.

In 2023, he won Red Bull Rampage for a second time. In the 2024 edition of Red Bull Rampage he suffered a heavy crash in the early stage of his second run. Cam Zink was airlifted to hospital in an unknown but stable condition.
