= Anthony Messere =

Canadian cyclist

Personal information
- Full name: Anthony Messere
- Nationality: Canadian
- Born: 3 April 1996 (age 30) Surrey, British Columbia, Canada (C.A.N.)
- Height: 5’2”

Sport
- Country: Canada
- Sport: Mountain Bike
Medal record
FMBA World Tour
Representing Canada
Bronze medal – third place	2011 Whistler	Slopestyle
Silver medal – second place	2011 Mount Washington	Slopestyle
Silver medal – second place	2011 Grand Junction	Slopestyle
Gold medal – first place	2012 Grand Junction	Slopestyle
Bronze medal – third place	2012 Mount Washington	Slopestyle
Gold medal – first place	2014 Les 2 Alpes	Slopestyle
Bronze medal – third place	2014 Whistler	Slopestlye
Bronze medal – third place	2018 Big White	Slopestyle

Anthony Messere (born 3 April 1996) is a professional freeride mountain bike rider from Surrey, British Columbia. He made his debut at Crankworx Red Bull Joyride in Whistler, British Columbia in 2011 at fifteen years old. Becoming the youngest athlete ever on a Crankworx podium, placing 3rd. He was considered a prodigy and was the first of a new generation of Slopestyle. In 2014 he won Crankworx Les Deux Alpes Slopestyle, which was his first major Slopestyle victory. Also taking another 3rd at Crankworx Whistler later in 2014. Placing 3rd overall in the FMBA world tour.
