= Robbie Bourdon =

Canadian mountain biker

Personal information
- Born: British Columbia, Canada

Cycling career
- Sport: Cycling
- Discipline: Mountain biking
- Role: Rider

Robbie Bourdon is a freeride mountain biker from Nelson, British Columbia, Canada. He is sponsored by Intense Cycles, Red Bull and Oakley.

== Career ==
A former member of the Kona Clump Team, he has appeared in all the New World Disorder videos. In 2001, Bourdon placed 5th in the All Terrain Mountain Bike Challenge in Jindabyne, Australia and 3rd in the Red Bull Rampage in Virgin, Utah.
