= Brandon Semenuk =

Canadian freeride mountain biker

Personal information
- Born: 2 February 1992 (age 34) Whistler, British Columbia, Canada
- Height: 6 ft 1 in (1.85 m)
- Weight: 176 lb (80 kg)

Cycling career
- Sport: Cycling
- Current team: Red Bull; Trek; Subaru Motorsports
- Disciplines: Freestyle Mountain Bikes, Rally Motor Racing
- Role: Stunt performer
- Rider type: Slopestyle, Freeride, Freestyle BMX
Medal record
Competition
Gold medal – first place	X Games Real MTB 2021	MTB
Gold medal – first place	Red Bull Joyride 2017	Slopestyle
Gold medal – first place	Red Bull Joyride 2015	Slopestyle
Gold medal – first place	Red Bull Joyride 2014	Slopestyle
Gold medal – first place	Red Bull Joyride 2013	Slopestyle
Gold medal – first place	Red Bull Joyride 2011	Slopestyle
Gold medal – first place	Red Bull Rampage 2024	Freeride
Gold medal – first place	Red Bull Rampage 2021	Freeride
Gold medal – first place	Red Bull Rampage 2019	Freeride
Gold medal – first place	Red Bull Rampage 2016	Freeride
Gold medal – first place	Red Bull Rampage 2008	Freeride
Silver medal – second place	X Games Munich 2013	Slopestyle
Silver medal – second place	Red Bull Joyride 2009	Slopestyle
Bronze medal – third place	Red Bull Joyride 2008	Slopestyle
Bronze medal – third place	Red Bull Joyride 2007	Slopestyle
Bronze medal – third place	Red Bull Rampage 2014	Freeride

Brandon Semenuk (born 2 February 1992) is a Canadian freestyle mountain biker and rally racer from Whistler, British Columbia. Semenuk is a five-time Freeride Mountain Bike World Tour Champion. He is a five-time Red Bull Joyride winner, X-Games Real MTB Gold Medalist (2021), and X-Games Silver medalist (2013) in the Mountain Bike Slopestyle event. He won the Red Bull Rampage in 2008, 2016, 2019, 2021, and 2024 – the first person to win Rampage five times. He is known to be "always emulated, never imitated" and is known as one of the best slopestyle/freeride mountain bikers in history. Semenuk won the 2022 and 2023 American Rally Association National championship.

== Early life and early career ==
Semenuk grew up in Whistler, British Columbia, Canada, where he started out in cross-country cycling, competing in the BC Cup for the first time at the age of nine. He also competed in Four-Cross early in his career. At the age of 15, while riding his local jumps, Semenuk's talent was spotted by Andrew Shandro. Shortly thereafter, Shandro offered Semenuk a professional contract with Trek

== Mountain Bike ==
In Slopestyle MTB, Semenuk took home gold and silver medals from X-Games (2013) and (2021). He won Red Bull Joyride in 2011, and also in 2013, 2014, 2015 and 2017, and is a five-time Red Bull Rampage winner, being the only athlete to accomplish this feat. For the 2015 mountain bike movie unReal, he was filmed in a one shot segment that went viral on the internet.

== Rallying ==
Semenuk has also been interested in rally driving since a young age, and as of April 2020, was welcomed to the Subaru Motorsports rally team alongside Travis Pastrana. He earned his first professional rally win on 5 October 2020, at the Missouri Show-Me Rally. On 15 October 2022, Semenuk became the 2022 American Rally Association presented by Dirtfish National Champion.

== Rally record ==
=== WRC results ===
Year	Entrant	Car	1	2	3	4	5	6	7	8	9	10	11	12	13	WDC	Points
2024	Brandon Semenuk	Toyota GR Yaris Rally2	MON	SWE	KEN	CRO	POR	ITA	POL	LAT; Ret	FIN	GRE	CHL	EUR	JPN	NC	0
