= Martin Söderström =

Swedish mountain biker

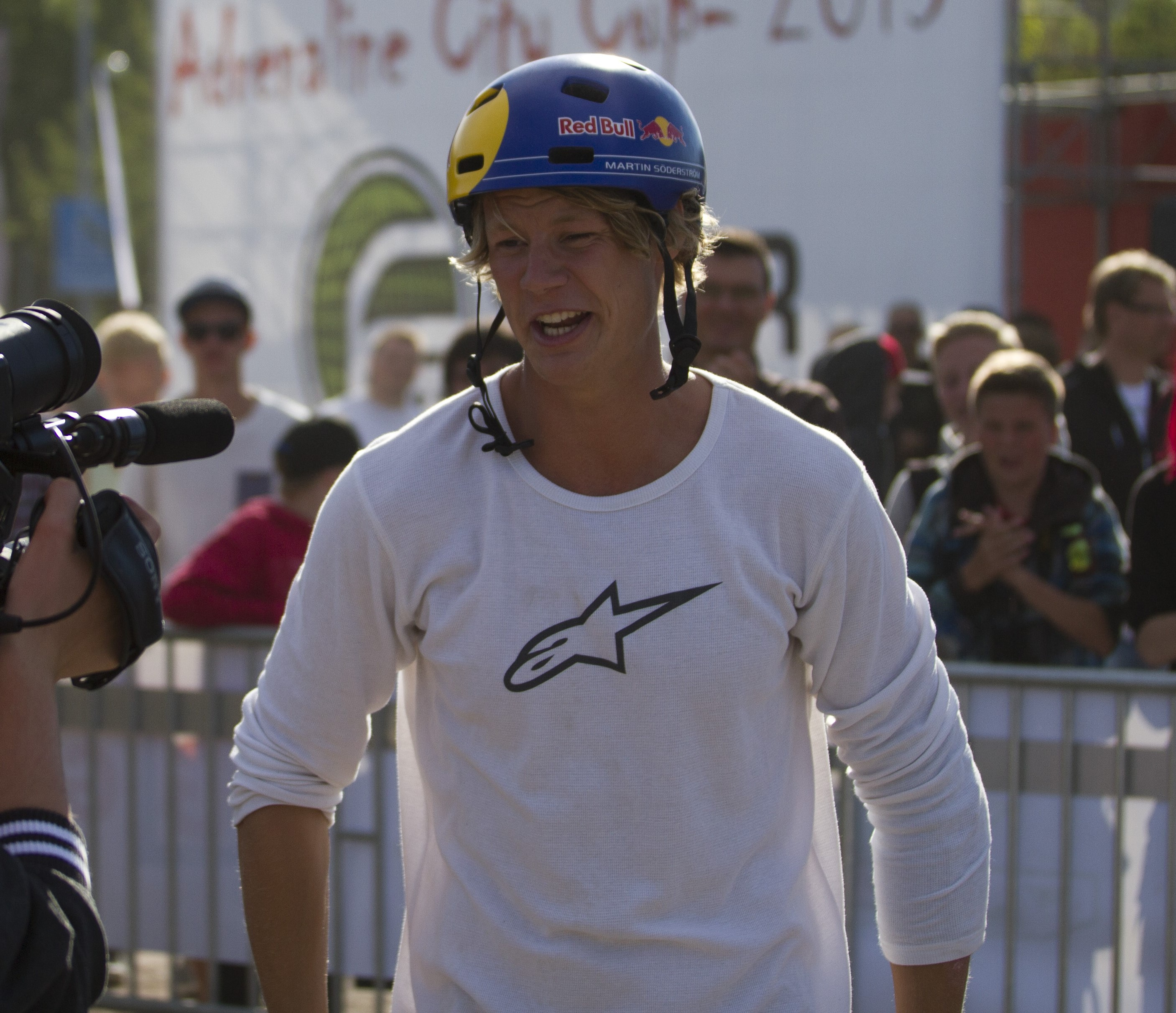
- Söderström, Adrenaline City Cup 2013

Personal information
- Born: 4 June 1990 (age 36) Uppsala, Sweden

Cycling career
- Sport: Cycling
- Discipline: Freestyle Mountain Bikes
- Role: Mountain bike legend
- Rider type: Slopestyle, Freeride

Martin Söderström (4 March 1990) is a professional Freeride mountain bike rider from Uppsala, Sweden.

He announced retirement from professional riding in August 2022.

In 2007 he won the Åre Slopestyle competition. In 2012 and 2013 he placed 2nd overall in the FMB World Tour. In 2013 he competed in Munich X-Games Slopestyle event finishing 6th overall out of 16 riders. In 2013 he took 2nd at Red Bull Joyride, but was seriously injured on his final ride; he was injured again shortly before the 2014 event.

In 2013 and 2014 he hosted an invitational meet in his hometown of Uppsala where fellow swede and good friend Anton Thelander won.

Between 2012 and 2014, he won some medals at the FISE (2 second place).

He has nowadays been getting closer to the Mountain Bike Racing scene in a new discipline called "Speed and Style". He has won some medals. He won a first, a second and a third place between 2018 and 2019.
