= Cédric Gracia =

French mountain biker

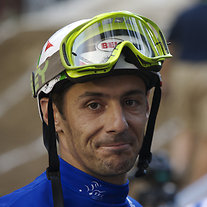

Personal information
- Full name: Cédric Gracia
- Nickname: CG
- Born: March 23, 1978 (age 48) Pau, France

Cycling career
- Sport: Cycling
- Current team: CG Racing Brigade
- Discipline: Mountain Bike
- Role: Rider
- Rider type: DH, 4x, Freeride, Slopestyle, Enduro
Medal record
Men's mountain bike racing
Representing France
World Championships
Silver medal – second place	2002 UCI Mountain Bike World Cup	Four-cross
Bronze medal – third place	2005 UCI Mountain Bike World Cup	Four-cross
Bronze medal – third place	1997 Château-d'Œx	Downhill
Freeride Competition
Gold medal – first place	Red Bull Rampage 2003	Freeride
Silver medal – second place	Red Bull Rampage 2002	Freeride

Cédric Gracia (born 23 March 1978 in Pau, France) is a French mountain biker, who now lives in Andorra.

== Career ==
He started his career as an athlete at 6 years old as a BMX rider and then a freestyle ski pro. Cedric Gracia, years later, became a mountain bike rider. He entered the professional mountain biking scene in 2001, then part of the Volvo/Cannondale team.

He races in downhill and four-cross (4X) on the UCI World circuit. Gracia rode for the Rainer-Wurz Siemens Cannondale team between 1999 and 2005, before joining the Commencal team in 2006. In 2003 Cedric won the Red Bull Rampage, a big-mountain freeride competition in Utah.

In 2008 he took part as a guest editor for the 20th anniversary issue of Mountain Biking UK (MBUK) magazine. In 2008, he also participated in the new Red Bull Rampage: Evolution. In addition, he recently won the Crankworx 4X competition. He also recently won the Urban Race in Brazil, Paris, Chile.

In 2010 Gracia started his own team, the CG Racing Brigade. During 2010 he was the only rider on the team but in 2011 Marcelo Guttierez, the Colombian National Champion, was added to the ranks. They are two of very few riders outside the Santa Cruz Syndicate to be using the carbon V-10 downhill bike during the 2011 season.

In 2012 Gracia had a major crash during practice at the Val Di Sole (Italy) race of the World Cup, and “almost died twice” in the days following.

In 2013, at the Vallnord race of the World Cup, Gracia announced his retirement from World Cup downhill racing to focus on “movie parts with big jumps” and Enduro racing.
