= Andrew Shandro =

Professional mountain biker (born 1971)

Andrew Shandro (born May 20, 1971) is a professional mountain biker. Shandro has starred in many films and featured in mountain bike magazines worldwide. The majority of Shandro's pictures are taken by his close friend Sterling Lorence. Andrew was born and raised on the North Shore, British Columbia. He is a competitive individual, and enjoys spending time with his kids.

== Career ==
Shandro began as a downhill racer. Eventually he decided to make a career of mountain biking and began starring in movies and pushing the limits of mountain biking. As of 2005 Shandro is one of the older riders, but remains one of the most respected. Shandro runs summer mountain biking camps where campers can receive coaching from world class mountain bikers. Shandro often rides at Whistler-Blackcomb.

His accomplishments include the following.

- Two Time World Cup Winner Downhill Mountain Bike
- Four Time Canadian National Champion Downhill MTB
- X-Games Gold Medalist Bikercross
- North American Champion Downhill MTB
- Multiple Podium and top Ten finisher US National Events
- Designed the Bikercross course for K2 Pro Event featured on ESPN
- Designed the World Cup Downhill course for Silver Star Mountain 1994

== Sponsors ==
Shandro's sponsors include:Helly Hansen; Trek Bicycle Corporation; Shimano; Bontrager; Dakine; Sombrio; Bean Around The World; Whistler Blackcomb; Fox Racing Shox; Smith; Nike 6.0; and Giro.
