= 2020 UCI Mountain Bike season =

2020 UCI MTB Season
Details
- Dates: 28 January – 28 November
- Location: World
- Races: +200

The 2020 UCI MTB Season was the fifthteeth season of the UCI MTB Season. The 2020 season began on 28 January 2020 with the Snow Bike Festival and ended in November 2020.

== Events ==
=== January ===
| Date | Race Name | Location | UCI Rating | Winner | Second | Third | Ref |
|---|---|---|---|---|---|---|---|
| 18 January | Snow Bike Festival | Switzerland | XCM | Joris Ryf (SUI); Janine Schneider (GER) | Nils Brun (SUI); Charline Fragnière (SUI) | Alessandro Saravalle (ITA); Marion Fromberger (GER) | |
| 18 January | Hellenic Cycling Federation Cup Vol. #1 | Greece | XCC | Dimitrios Antoniadis (GRE); Rina Matsumoto (JPN) | Konstantinos Konstantinidis (GRE); Alexandra Adam (GRE) | Periklis Ilias (GRE); Varvara Fasoi (GRE) | |
| 18 January | UCI MTB Marathon Series #1 – Momentum Health | South Africa | XCM | Matthew Beers (RSA); Jennie Stenerhag (SWE) | Matthys Beukes (RSA); Robyn de Groot (RSA) | Wessel Botha (RSA); Barbara Benkó (HUN) | |
| 18–19 January | Costa Rican Open DH | Costa Rica | DH | Roberto Castillo Vaughan (CRC); Mariana Salazar (ESA) | Pablo Aguilar Omodeo (CRC); María José Montoya (HON) | Titus Nicholson (USA); Riley Weidman (USA) | |
| 19 January | Hellenic Cycling Federation Cup Vol. #2 | Greece | XCC | Dimitrios Antoniadis (GRE); Rina Matsumoto (JPN) | Konstantinos Konstantinidis (GRE); Varvara Fasoi (GRE) | Ilias Tsortouktsidis (GRE); Alexandra Adam (GRE) | |
| 25–26 January | Copa Chile Internacional Valdivia 2020 | Chile | XCO | Luiz Henrique Cocuzzi (BRA); Evelyn Muñoz Jaramillo (CHI) | Martin Vidaurre Kossman (CHI); Catalina Maria Vidaurre Kossmann (CHI) | Sebastian Miranda Maldonado (CHI); Luciana Roland (ARG) | |
| 25–28 January | Club La Santa 4 Stage MTB Lanzarote | Spain | XCS | Luca Braidot (ITA); Caroline Bohé (DEN) | Sergio Mantecón Gutiérrez (ESP); Greta Seiwald (ITA) | Bartłomiej Wawak (POL); Emily Batty (CAN) | |
| 30 January – 2 February | Costa Blanca Bike Race | Spain | XCS | Hans Becking (NED); Githa Michiels (BEL) | Tiago Ferreira (POR); Rebecca McConnell (AUS) | Anton Sintsov (RUS); Rocio Del Alba Garcia Martinez (ESP) | |
| 31 January – 2 February | South American Downhill | Chile | DH | Sebastián Contreras Barrera (CHI); Andrea Farías (CHI) | Alejandro Francisco Caerols Valenzuela (CHI) | Brener Montes Tolentino (PER) | |

=== February ===
| Date | Race Name | Location | UCI Rating | Winner | Second | Third | Ref |
|---|---|---|---|---|---|---|---|
| 1 February | Hellenic Cycling Federation Cup Vol.#3 | Greece | XCC | Periklis Ilias (GRE); Sofia Liodaki (GRE) | Ilias Tsortouktsidis (GRE); Eirini Maria Karousou (GRE) | Anastasios Kourmpetis (GRE); Eleftheria Giachou (GRE) | |
| 1–2 February | I Válida Nacional MTB | Colombia | XCO | Fabio Hernando Castañeda (COL); Angie Lara Zarazo (COL) | Hilvar Yamid Malaver Calderón (COL); Leidy Mera (COL) | Juan Fernando Monroy (COL); Diana Pinilla Cuellar (COL) | |
| 2 February | Abierto Internacional Santa Maria | Argentina | XCO | Jorge Álvaro Macías (ARG); Paula Quirós (ARG) | Dario Alejandro Gasco (ARG); Agustina Maria Apaza (ARG) | Guilherme Gotardelo Müller (BRA); Agustina Antonella Quirós (ARG) | |
| 2 February | Hellenic Cycling Federation Cup Vol. #4 | Greece | XCC | Periklis Ilias (GRE); Alexandra Adam (GRE) | Ilias Tsortouktsidis (GRE); Eirini Maria Karousou (GRE) | Charalampos Kastrantas (GRE); Eleftheria Giachou (GRE) | |
| 2 February | Copa Chile Internacional CMPC Angol 2020 | Chile | XCO | Luiz Henrique Cocuzzi (BRA); Luciana Roland (ARG) | Martín Vidaurre Kossmann (CHI); Evelyn Muñoz Jaramillo (CHI) | Nicolás Delich Pardo (CHI); Catalina Maria Vidaurre Kossmann (CHI) | |
| 6–9 February | Momentum Health Tankwa Trek | South Africa | XCS | Urs Huber (SUI); Mariske Strauss (RSA) | Simon Stiebjahn (GER); Candice Lill (RSA) | Sebastian Carstensen (DEN); Nadine Rieder (GER) | |
| 7 February | HERO Dubai | United Arab Emirates | XCM | Héctor Leonardo Páez (COL); Blaža Klemenčič (SVN) | Peeter Pruus (EST); Kataržina Sosna (LTU) | Kristian Hynek (CZE); Faranak Partoazar (IRI) | |
| 9 February | Salamina Epic MTB Cup Race #1 | Greece | XCO | Jofre Cullell Estapé (ESP); Vera Medvedeva (RUS) | Bartłomiej Wawak (POL); Clàudia Galicia Cotrina (ESP) | Jan Vastl (CZE); Greta Seiwald (ITA) | |
| 11–14 February | Salamina Epic MTB Cup Race #2 | Greece | XCO | Jofre Cullell Estapé (ESP); Clàudia Galicia Cotrina (ESP) | Jan Vastl (CZE); Vera Medvedeva (RUS) | Jan Škarnitzl (CZE); Greta Seiwald (ITA) | |
| 13–16 February | Mediterranean Epic | Spain | XCS | David Valero (ESP); Ramona Forchini (SUI) | Milan Vader (NED); Emily Batty (CAN) | Victor Koretzky (FRA); Jacqueline Schneebeli (SUI) | |
| 15 February | SA XCO Cup Series | South Africa | XCO | Alan Hatherly (RSA); Danielle Strydom (RSA) | Wessel Botha (RSA); Frances Janse van Rensburg (RSA) | Alex Miller (RSA); Lehane Oosthuizen (RSA) | |
| 17–20 February | Salamina Epic MTB Cup Race #3 | Greece | XCS | Timofei Ivanov (RUS); Caroline Bohé (DEN) | Bartłomiej Wawak (POL); Vera Medvedeva (RUS) | Andrew L'Esperance (CAN); Erin Huck (USA) | |
| 19–22 February | Samarathon | Israel | XCS | Guy Sessler (ISR); Coline Brunel (FRA) | Sven Strähle (GER); Noémie Garnier (FRA) | Tomer Zaltsman (ISR); Na'ama Noyman (ISR) | |
| 20–23 February | Velo Alanya Stage Race | Turkey | XCS | Ivan Filatov (RUS); Urara Kawaguchi (JPN) | Loan Cheneval (FRA); Jovana Crnogorac (SRB) | Erik Groen (NED); Teodora Savić-Popović (SRB) | |
| 22–23 February | Copa Catalana Internacional BTT | Spain | XCO | Henrique Avancini (BRA); Evie Richards (GBR) | Victor Koretzky (FRA); Haley Batten (USA) | Jordan Sarrou (FRA); Annie Last (GBR) | |
| 23 February | Salamina Epic MTB Cup Race #4 | Greece | XCO | Zaccaria Toccoli (ITA); Erin Huck (USA) | Nicholas Pettina (ITA); Vera Medvedeva (RUS) | Timofei Ivanov (RUS); Paula Gorycka (POL) | |
| 23 February | Lythrodontas MTB 2020 | Cyprus | XCO | Karl Markt (AUT); Kate Courtney (USA) | Vilgot Lindh (SWE); Oksana Rybakova (RUS) | Mārtiņš Blūms (LVA); Hanna Capusceac (UKR) | |
| 23 February | Abierto Noa XCO | Argentina | XCO | Catriel Soto (ARG); Paula Quirós (ARG) | Fernando Contreras (ARG); Agustina Maria Apaza (ARG) | Luiz Henrique Cocuzzi (BRA); Florencia Anabel Ávila (ARG) | |
| 23 February | Tropical Mountain Bike Challenge | Puerto Rico | XCO | Gerardo Ulloa (MEX); Chloe Woodruff (USA) | Guilherme Gotardelo Müller (BRA); Daniela Campuzano (MEX) | Jhonnatan Botero Villegas (COL); Savilia Blunk (USA) | |
| 25 February – 1 March | Andalucía Bike Race | Spain | XCS | Fabian Rabensteiner (ITA); Eva Lechner (ITA) | Ben Zwiehoff (GER); Janika Lõiv (EST) | Léandre Bouchard (CAN); Mariske Strauss (RSA) | |
| 27 February – 1 March | Cyprus Sunshine Epic | Cyprus | XCS | Ondřej Cink (CZE); Annika Langvad (DEN) | Bartłomiej Wawak (POL); Haley Batten (USA) | Alan Hatherly (RSA); Kate Courtney (USA) | |
| 28 February | Al Adaid Desert Challenge | Qatar | XCP | Frédéric Gombert (FRA); Pia Sundstedt (FIN) | Gregor Sikošek (SVN); Sophie Giovani (FRA) | Szymon Wasiak (POL); Isora Sosa Caballero (ESP) | |
| 28 February | Trek XCO 2 | Israel | XCO | Guy Sessler (ISR); Na'ama Noyman (ISR) | Periklis Ilias (GRE); Lianne Witkin (ISR) | Tomer Zaltsman (ISR); Deborah Ohayon (ISR) | |
| 29 February – 1 March | Copa Chile Internacional UCI XCO | Chile | XCO | Nicolás Delich Pardo (CHI); Evelyn Muñoz Jaramillo (CHI) | Sebastián Miranda Maldonado (CHI); Luciana Roland (ARG) | Jorge Álvaro Macías (ARG); Catalina Maria Vidaurre Kossmann (CHI) | |

=== March ===
| Date | Race Name | Location | UCI Rating | Winner | Second | Third | Ref |
|---|---|---|---|---|---|---|---|
| 1 March | Taça Brasil de XCO | Brazil | XCO | José Gabriel Marques de Almeida (BRA); Jaqueline Mourão (BRA) | Gustavo Xavier de Oliveira Pereira (BRA); Débora Moura Costa (BRA) | Sherman Trezza de Paiva (BRA); Sheila Mendonça Gomes (BRA) | |
| 1 March | Internacionales XCO Chelva | Spain | XCO | Victor Koretzky (FRA); Maja Włoszczowska (POL) | Titouan Carod (FRA); Rocio Del Alba Garcia Martinez (ESP) | Jordan Sarrou (FRA); Yana Belomoyna (UKR) | |
| 1 March | Puerto Rico MTB Cup | Puerto Rico | XCO | Gerardo Ulloa (MEX); Chloe Woodruff (USA) | Guilherme Gotardelo Müller (BRA); Daniela Campuzano (MEX) | Fabio Hernando Castañeda Monsalve (COL); Erika Monserrath Rodríguez Suárez (MEX) | |
| 1 March | Massi chabrieres | France | XCO | Hugo Drechou (FRA); Lena Gerault (FRA) | Thomas Griot (FRA); Camille Devi (FRA) | Maxime Loret (FRA); Lucie Urruty (FRA) | |
| 4–8 March | Crankworx Rotorua Downhill | New Zealand | DH | Michael Hannah (AUS); Tracey Hannah (AUS) | Sam Blenkinsop (NZL); Jessica Blewitt (NZL) | George Brannigan (NZL); Jill Kintner (USA) | |
| 5–8 March | CIMTB Michelin – Copa Internacional MTB – SHC | Brazil | END–XCS | Erick Eduardo Bruske (BRA); Isabella Gonçalves Ribeiro (BRA) (Enduro Women); Henrique Avancini (BRA); Raiza Goulão (BRA) (XCS Women) | Nataniel Giacomozzi (BRA); Patricia Lichtenberg Roxo Loureiro (BRA) (Enduro Women); Héctor Leonardo Páez (COL); Paula Quirós (ARG) (XCS Women) | Diogo Malagon (BRA); Mariza Helena de Araujo Souza (BRA) (Enduro Women); Ulan Bastos Galinski (BRA); Agustina Maria Apaza (ARG) (XCS Women) | |
| 5–8 March | Manavgat – Velo Side MTB Stage Race | Turkey | XCS | Matej Ulík (SVK); Tereza Tvarůžková (CZE) | Ivan Filatov (RUS); Tatsiana Soupel (BLR) | Guy Sessler (ISR); Urara Kawaguchi (JPN) | |
| 6–7 March | UCI E-MTB Cross-Country World Cup | Monaco | END | Jérôme Gilloux (FRA); Nathalie Schneitter (SUI) | Francescu Camoin (FRA); Alba Wunderlin (SUI) | Joris Ryf (SUI); Mélanie Pugin (FRA) | |
| 6–8 March | E-MTB – WES E-Bike Monaco | Monaco | END | José Borges (POR); Mélanie Pugin (FRA) | Francescu Camoin (FRA); Alba Wunderlin (SUI) | Nicolas Quéré (FRA); Maaris Meier (EST) | |
| 6–8 March | Tennessee National | United States | DH | Dakotah Norton (USA); Frida Helena Rønning (NOR) | Luca Shaw (USA); Rachel Pageau (CAN) | Neko Mulally (USA); Kera Linn (USA) | |
| 7 March | Hellenic Cycling Federation Cup Vol. #5 | Greece | XCO | Periklis Ilias (GRE); Aikaterini Eleftheriadou (GRE) | Dimitrios Antoniadis (GRE) | Théo Charmes (FRA) | |
| 7–8 March | Indurocs Borobudur | Indonesia | END | Rama Teguh Adi Pratama (INA); Firda Nabila Nur Azizah (INA) | Yavento Ditra Pranata (INA); Regina Patricia Pani (INA) | Yadi Mulyadi (INA); Laelatus Sa'adah (INA) | |
| 8 March | Descenso Sant Andreu De La Barca Gran Premi Diputació De Barcelona | Spain | DH | Theo Erlangsen (RSA); Nastasia Gimenez (FRA) | Ignasi Jorba Prats (ESP); Alessia Missiaggia (ITA) | Edgar Carballo González (ESP); Telma Torregrosa (ESP) | |
| 8 March | Hellenic Cycling Federation Cup Vol. #6 | Greece | XCO | Periklis Ilias (GRE); Aikaterini Eleftheriadou (GRE) | Dimitrios Antoniadis (GRE) | Ilias Tsortouktsidis (GRE) | |
| 8 March | Copa Catalana Internacional BTT 2020 – Copa Catalana Internacional Corró D'amunt | Spain | XCO | Hugo Drechou (FRA); Yana Belomoyna (UKR) | Thomas Griot (FRA); Githa Michiels (BEL) | Simon Andreassen (DEN); Janika Lõiv (EST) | |
| 8 March | Portugal Cup XCO | Portugal | XCO | Jofre Cullell (ESP); Alessandra Keller (SUI) | Sergio Mantecón Gutiérrez (ESP); Maja Włoszczowska (POL) | Ismael Esteban Agüero (ESP); Rocío García (ESP) | |
| 8 March | Abierto Argentino XCO | Argentina | XCO | Jorge Álvaro Macías (ARG); Francisca Candelaria Chiesa Bachey (ARG) | Edgar Parada (ARG); María Valentina Santomartino (ARG) | Franco Delgado (ARG); Pilar Adoue (ARG) | |
| 14 March | Justiniano Hotel MTB Cup | Turkey | XCO | Martin Gluth (GER); Vera Medvedeva (RUS) | Reto Indergand (SUI); Tereza Tvarůžková (CZE) | Dmytro Titarenko (UKR); Ekaterina Kovalchuk (RUS) | |
| 14–15 March | Taça Brasil XCO Brasil Ride | Brazil | XCO | Guilherme Gotardelo Müller (BRA); Raiza Goulão (BRA) | Ulan Bastos Galinski (BRA); Jaqueline Mourão (BRA) | Sherman Trezza de Paiva (BRA); Karen Olimpio (BRA) | |

=== July ===
| Date | Race Name | Location | UCI Rating | Winner | Second | Third | Ref |
|---|---|---|---|---|---|---|---|
| 2–5 July | Salcano-Kyocera MTB Cup Vojvodina | Serbia | XTS | Mickaël Brunello (FRA); Jovana Crnogorac (SRB) | Thibaut André Gallis (FRA); Emilija Đačanin (SRB) | Admir Kolašinac (SRB); Jovana Radovanović (SRB) | |
| 4–5 July | Strabag Czech MTB cup | Czech Republic | XCO | Ondřej Cink (CZE); Anne Terpstra (NED) | Maxime Marotte (FRA); Jitka Čábelická (CZE) | Karl Markt (AUT); Jana Czeczinkarová (CZE) | |
| 5 July | Warsaw Cup | Poland | XCO | Filip Helta (POL); Aleksandra Podgórska (POL) | Krzysztof Łukasik (POL); Klaudia Czabok (POL) | Karol Ostaszewski (POL); Antonina Białek (POL) | |
| 12 July | Strabag Cup | Czech Republic | XCP | Tomáš Paprstka (CZE); Jitka Čábelická (CZE) | Jan Škarnitzl (CZE); Tereza Tvarůžková (CZE) | Lukáš Kobes (CZE); Jana Czeczinkarová (CZE) | |
| 12 July | Petrovaradin Fotress Novi Sad | Serbia | XCO | Aleksandar Roman (SRB); Lejla Tanović (BIH) | Siarhei Stets (BLR); Ivana Kostić (SRB) | Dušan Kostović (SRB); Jana Jolović (SRB) | |
| 16 July | Sparta MTB Race #1 | Greece | XCO | Esteban Bagnon (FRA); Paula Gorycka (POL) | Andreas Miltiadis (CYP); Laure Souty (FRA) | Periklis Ilias (GRE); Varvara Fasoi (GRE) | |
| 17 July | Sparta MTB Race #2 | Greece | XCO | Esteban Bagnon (FRA); Paula Gorycka (POL) | Andreas Miltiadis (CYP); Laure Souty (FRA) | Dimitrios Antoniadis (GRE); Varvara Fasoi (GRE) | |
| 17–19 July | iXS Downhill Cup – Pamporovo | Bulgaria | DHI | Thomas Guibal (FRA) | Alexandros Topkaroglou (GRE) | Stevian Gatev (BUL) | |
| 17–19 July | Proffix Swiss bike Cup Leukerbad | Switzerland | XCO | Nino Schurter (SUI); Sina Frei (SUI) | Mathias Flückiger (SUI); Jolanda Neff (SUI) | Jordan Sarrou (FRA); Loana Lecomte (FRA) | |
| 18 July | Triada MTB Paltinis | Romania | XCO | Pierre-Geoffroy Plantet (FRA); Eszter Bereczki (ROU) | Lucian Logigan (ROU) | Jean Demoulin (FRA) | |
| 19 July | Sparta MTB Race #3 | Greece | XCO | Esteban Bagnon (FRA); Paula Gorycka (POL) | Periklis Ilias (GRE); Laure Souty (FRA) | Andreas Miltiadis (CYP); Varvara Fasoi (GRE) | |
| 25 July | Trans Brdy – XCM | Czech Republic | XCM | David Gysling (SUI); Angelika Tazreiter (AUT) | Jan Škarnitzl (CZE); Klára Pavelková (CZE) | Jan Vastl (CZE); Karoline Neumüller (AUT) | |

=== August ===
| Date | Race Name | Location | UCI Rating | Winner | Second | Third | Ref |
|---|---|---|---|---|---|---|---|
| 6–9 August | Colina Triste | Spain | XCS | Tiago Ferreira (POR); Rocío García (ESP) | Hans Becking (NED); Natalia Fischer Egusquiza (ESP) | Ismael Ventura Sánchez (ESP); Nùria Bosch Pico (ESP) | |
| 8 August | Strabag Czech MTB cup | Czech Republic | XCO | Sebastian Carstensen (DEN); Anne Terpstra (NED) | Simon Andreassen (DEN); Alessandra Keller (SUI) | Ondřej Cink (CZE); Yana Belomoyna (UKR) | |
| 8–9 August | French Cup XCO / DHI | France | XCO-DH | Milan Vader (NED) (XCO); Loris Vergier (FRA) (DHI); Lena Gerault (FRA) (XCO); Mélanie Chappaz (FRA) (DHI) | Jordan Sarrou (FRA) (XCO); Angel Suárez Alonso (ESP) (DHI); Jolanda Neff (SUI) (XCO); Mariana Salazar (ESA) (DHI) | Thomas Litscher (SUI) (XCO); Thomas Estaque (FRA) (DHI); Loana Lecomte (FRA) (XCO); Estelle Charles (FRA) (DHI) | |
| 10–14 August | Transmaurienne Vanoise | France | XCS | Héctor Leonardo Páez (COL); Eva Lechner (ITA) | Lukas Flückiger (SUI); Costanza Fasolis (ITA) | Tony Longo (ITA); Anaïs Grimault (FRA) | |
| 12–16 August | Verbier E-Bike Festival | Switzerland | E-XCM | Team Lapierre; Team Haibike | Team Cube; Team Trek | Team Bosch; Team Specialized | |
| 15 August | Vysočina Arena Tour | Czech Republic | XCM | Filip Adel (CZE); Jana Pichlíková (CZE) | Dominik Buksa (CZE); Klára Pavelková (CZE) | Marek Rauchfuss (CZE); Kateřina Drhová (CZE) | |
| 15–16 August | French Cup DHI | France | DHI | Benoît Coulanges (FRA); Myriam Nicole (FRA) | Hugo Frixtalon (FRA); Camille Balanche (SUI) | Loris Vergier (FRA); Mélanie Chappaz (FRA) | |
| 18–22 August | Swiss Epic | Switzerland | XCS | Nino Schurter (SUI); Annika Langvad (DEN) | Lars Forster (SUI); Haley Batten (USA) | Fabian Rabensteiner (ITA); Stefanie Dohrn (GER) | |
| 21–23 August | Proffix Swiss bike Cup Gstaad | Switzerland | XCO | Mathias Flückiger (SUI); Laura Stigger (AUT) | Anton Cooper (NZL); Alessandra Keller (SUI) | Lukas Flückiger (SUI); Kathrin Stirnemann (SUI) | |
| 23 August | XC Kocevje 2020 | Slovenia | XCO | Samuel Gaze (NZL); Tanja Žakelj (SVN) | Luca Braidot (ITA); Yana Belomoyna (UKR) | Daniele Braidot (ITA); Janika Lõiv (EST) | |
| 26–30 August | Enduro World Series – Zermatt – Round 1 + E-MTB Enduro – Round 1 | Switzerland | END; E-MTB END | Jesse Melamed (CAN) (END); Isabeau Courdurier (FRA) (END); Yannick Pontal (FRA) (E-MTB END); Mélanie Pugin (FRA) (E-MTB END) | Martin Maes (BEL) (END); Morgane Charre (FRA) (END); Nicolas Vouilloz (FRA) (E-MTB END); Tracy Moseley (GBR) (E-MTB END) | Théo Galy (FRA) (END); Ella Conolly (GBR) (END); José Borges (POR) (E-MTB END); Nathalie Schneitter (SUI) (E-MTB END) | |
| 28 August | Misgav International | Israel | XCS | Ori Leonzini (ISR); Na'ama Noyman (ISR) | Yonatan Yatom (ISR); Lianne Witkin (ISR) | Nadav Raisberg (ISR); Gali Weinberg (ISR) | |
| 29 August | Strabag Czech MTB cup | Czech Republic | XCO | Henrique Avancini (BRA); Anne Terpstra (NED) | Maxime Marotte (FRA); Maja Włoszczowska (POL) | Nadir Colledani (ITA); Tanja Žakelj (SVN) | |
| 30 August | Górale na Start | Poland | XCO | Filip Helta (POL); Jana Czeczinkarová (CZE) | Matej Ulik (SVK); Tereza Tvarůžková (CZE) | Maciej Jeziorski (POL); Aleksandra Podgórska (POL) | |
| 30 August | Zanzenbergrennen | Austria | XCO | Victor Koretzky (FRA); Alessandra Keller (SUI) | Filippo Colombo (SUI); Laura Stigger (AUT) | Gerhard Kerschbaumer (ITA); Annie Last (GBR) | |
| 30 August | French Cup DHI | France | DH | Loris Vergier (FRA); Camille Balanche (SUI) | Greg Minnaar (RSA); Monica Hrastnik (SVN) | Benoît Coulanges (FRA); Veronika Widmann (ITA) | |
| 30 August | 3 Nations Cup – GP Stad Beringen | Belgium | XCO | Titouan Carod (FRA); Pauline Ferrand-Prévot (FRA) | Jordan Sarrou (FRA); Eva Lechner (ITA) | Joshua Dubau (FRA); Sophie von Berswordt-Wallrabe (NED) | |
| 30 August | Argovia Vittoria-Fischer Cup Langendorf | Switzerland | XCO | Joris Ryf (SUI); Isla Short (GBR) | Lukas Flückiger (SUI); Linda Indergand (SUI) | Fabio Püntener (SUI); Kathrin Stirnemann (SUI) | |

=== September ===
| Date | Race Name | Location | UCI Rating | Winner | Second | Third | Ref |
|---|---|---|---|---|---|---|---|
| 6 September | XCO Strazilovo | Serbia | XCO | Rob Vanden Haesevelde (BEL); Valentina Nestorović (SRB) | Marko Stanimirović (SRB); Jovana Radovanović (SRB) | Siarhei Stets (BLR); Emilija Đačanin (SRB) | |
| 12 September | UCI MTB Marathon Series CST Singletrack MTB Maraton Košice | Slovakia | XCM | Jakub Jenčuš (SVK); Blaža Klemenčič (SVN) | Dominik Buksa (CZE); Lejla Tanović (BIH) | Karel Hartl (CZE); Janka Keseg Števková (SVK) | |
| 12–13 September | French Cup DHI | France | DHI | Loïc Bruni (FRA); Myriam Nicole (FRA) | Finn Iles (CAN); Marine Cabirou (FRA) | Thibaut Dapréla (FRA); Tracey Hannah (AUS) | |
| 13 September | XVIII. Pilis MTB Cup | Hungary | XCO | Zsombor Palumby (HUN); Kata Blanka Vas (HUN) | András Parti (HUN); Barbara Benkó (HUN) | András Szatmáry (HUN); Virág Buzsáki (HUN) | |
| 13 September | XCO Samobor | Croatia | XCO | Vlad Dascălu (ROU); Manon Mantei (FRA) | Simone Avondetto (ITA) | Maxime Loret (FRA) | |
| 13 September | 23. MTB Cross Country "Rund um den Roadlberg" | Austria | XCO | Anton Cooper (NZL); Laura Stigger (AUT) | Gerhard Kerschbaumer (ITA); Erin Huck (USA) | Nadir Colledani (ITA); Janika Lõiv (EST) | |
| 13 September | UCI MTB MARATHON SERIES – o-tour Bike Obwalden | Switzerland | XCM | Martin Fanger (SWI); Ariane Lüthi (SUI) | Urs Huber (SUI); Esther Süss (SUI) | Marc Stutzmann (SUI); Andrea Ming (SUI) | |
| 13 September | Górale na Start | Poland | XCO | Henrique Avancini (BRA); Evie Richards (GBR) | Maxime Marotte (FRA); Maja Włoszczowska (POL) | Daniel McConnell (AUS); Isla Short (GBR) | |
| 13 September | 3 Nations Cup – Riderz | Netherlands | XCO | Milan Vader (NED); Sophie von Berswordt-Wallrabe (NED) | Erno McCrae (BEL); Sofie Heby Pedersen (DEN) | Sam de Nijs (NED); Anne Tauber (NED) | |
| 13 September | Buthiers MTB XCO | France | XCO | Victor Koretzky (FRA); Loana Lecomte (FRA) | Jordan Sarrou (FRA); Pauline Ferrand-Prévot (FRA) | Thomas Griot (FRA); Lucie Urruty (FRA) | |
| 17–19 September | E-MTB Enduro – Round 2 | Italy | E-MTB | Nicolas Vouilloz (FRA); Tracy Moseley (GBR) | Emanuel Pombo (POR); Nadine Sapin (FRA) | José Borges (POR); Maaris Meier (EST) | |
| 17–20 September | ENDURO WORLD SERIES – Pietra Ligure – Round 2 | Italy | END | Adrien Dailly (FRA); Mélanie Pugin (FRA) | Florian Nicolaï (FRA); Isabeau Courdurier (FRA) | Jack Moir (AUS); Morgane Charre (FRA) | |
| 17–20 September | Grand Prix Banjaluka | Bosnia and Herzegovina | XCS | Antoine Philipp (FRA); Lejla Tanović (BIH) | Benjamin Le Ny (FRA); Manon Mantei (FRA) | Rémy Duquesne (FRA); Valentina Nestorović (SRB) | |
| 17–20 September | Velo Erciyes MTB Stage Race | Turkey | XCS | Abdülkadir Kelleci (TUR); Iryna Slobodyan (UKR) | Hennadii Moiseiev (UKR); Maria Sherstiuk (UKR) | Tom Reho (UKR); Semra Yetiş (TUR) | |
| 20 September | 3 Nations Cup – Drenthe MTB cup | Netherlands | XCO | Pierre de Froidmont (BEL); Anne Tauber (NED) | Kevin Panhuyzen (BEL); Mariske Strauss (RSA) | Arne Janssens (BEL); Lotte Koopmans (NED) | |
| 20 September | 2020 UCI Mountain Bike World Cup – XCE | Belgium | XCE | Jeroen van Eck (NED); Gaia Tormena (ITA) | Hugo Briatta (FRA); Coline Clauzure (FRA) | Simon Gegenheimer (GER); Didi de Vries (NED) | |
| 20 September | Erciyes DHI C2 | Turkey | DHI | Emirhan Eroğlu (TUR); Burcu Sahin (TUR) | Yavuz Aksoy (TUR) | Adilhan Şanlı (TUR) | |
| 23 September | Central Anatolia MTB Cup | Turkey | XCO | Dmytro Titarenko (UKR); Iryna Popova (UKR) | Hennadii Moiseiev (UKR); Iryna Slobodyan (UKR) | Abdülkadir Kelleci (TUR); Maria Sherstiuk (UKR) | |
| 24 September | Kayseri MTB Cup | Turkey | XCO | Dmytro Titarenko (UKR); Iryna Popova (UKR) | Oleksandr Koniaiev (UKR); Iryna Slobodyan (UKR) | Volodymyr Kozlovskyy (UKR); Maria Sherstiuk (UKR) | |
| 24–26 September | ENDURO WORLD SERIES – Finale Ligure – Round 3 | Italy | END | Jesse Melamed (CAN); Morgane Charre (FRA) | Florian Nicolaï (FRA); Harriet Harnden (GBR) | Jack Moir (AUS); Mélanie Pugin (FRA) | |
| 25–27 September | UCI MTB MARATHON SERIES – Mythic Chrono Merida – Vélo Vert Festival | France | XCM | Simon Schneller (GER); Margot Moschetti (FRA) | Martin Frey (GER); Juliette Gente (FRA) | Ben Thomas (GBR); Nienke Oostra (NED) | |
| 26 September | UCI MTB MARATHON SERIES – Sea Otter Europe Girona | Spain | XCM | Samuel Gaze (NZL); Clàudia Galicia Cotrina (ESP) | Francesc Guerra (ESP); Arantxa Salvadó Vergés (ESP) | Alejandro Gómez (BOL); Lourdes Cayetano Puertas (ESP) | |
| 26–27 September | Coupe du Japon Misaka International | Japan | XCO | Kohei Yamamoto (JPN); Miho Imai (JPN) | Toki Sawada (JPN); Urara Kawaguchi (JPN) | Riki Kitabayashi (JPN); Yuuka Yabuki (JPN) | |
| 29 September–1 October | 2020 UCI Mountain Bike World Cup – XCO/XCC | Czech Republic | XCO/XCC | Simon Andreassen (DEN) (XCO); Loana Lecomte (FRA) (XCO); José Gerardo Ulloa (MEX) (XCC); Evie Richards (GBR) (XCC) | Maxime Marotte (FRA) (XCO); Anne Terpstra (NED) (XCO); Victor Koretzky (FRA) (XCC); Pauline Ferrand-Prévot (FRA) (XCC) | Milan Vader (NED) (XCO); Pauline Ferrand-Prévot (FRA) (XCO); Maxime Marotte (FRA) (XCC); Loana Lecomte (FRA) (XCC) | |

=== October ===
| Date | Race Name | Location | UCI Rating | Winner | Second | Third | Ref |
|---|---|---|---|---|---|---|---|
| 1 October | Victory Day – Zafer Bayramı MTB Cup | Turkey | XCO | Hugo Weiss (FRA); Duygu Acar (TUR) | Baptiste Truntschka (FRA) | Mehmet Alper (TUR) | |
| 2 October | Mirada Del Lago Hotel MTB Cup | Turkey | XCO | Baptiste Truntschka (FRA); Duygu Acar (TUR) | Hugo Weiss (FRA) | Denis Sergiyenko (KAZ) | |
| 2–4 October | 2020 UCI Mountain Bike World Cup – XCO/XCC | Czech Republic | XCO/XCC | Henrique Avancini (BRA) (XCO); Pauline Ferrand-Prévot (FRA) (XCO); Henrique Avancini (BRA) (XCC); Evie Richards (GBR) (XCC) | Milan Vader (NED) (XCO); Anne Terpstra (NED) (XCO); Thomas Litscher (SUI) (XCC); Pauline Ferrand-Prévot (FRA) (XCC) | Nino Schurter (SUI) (XCO); Loana Lecomte (FRA) (XCO); Maximilian Brandl (GER) (XCC); Laura Stigger (AUT) (XCC) | |
| 2–4 October | Crankworx Innsbruck Downhill | Austria | DHI | David Trummer (AUT); Valentina Höll (AUT) | Edward Masters (NZL); Tracey Hannah (AUS) | Charlie Harrison (USA); Morgane Charre (FRA) | |
| 3 October | MT Argeus 2200 MTB Cup | Turkey | XCO | Abdülkadir Kelleci (TUR); Azize Bekar (TUR) | Denis Sergiyenko (KAZ) | Baptiste Truntschka (FRA) | |
| 3–4 October | 27 Trofeo Laigueglia MTB Classic | Italy | XCO | Peeter Pruus (EST); Kataržina Sosna (LTU) | Bruno Vitali (SUI); Matilde Bolzan (ITA) | Michele Casagrande (ITA); Julia Maria Graf (ITA) | |
| 4 October | Copa Catalana Internacional BTT | Spain | XCO | Cristofer Bosque Ruano (ESP); Sabrina Enaux (FRA) | Killian Desbiens (FRA); Clàudia Galicia Cotrina (ESP) | Raphael Gay (FRA); Léa Bouilloux (FRA) | |
| 4 October | UCI MTB MARATHON SERIES – Extreme sur loue | France | XCM | Simon Stiebjahn (GER); Laura Stark (GER) | Urs Huber (SUI); Estelle Morel (FRA) | Simon Schneller (GER); Barbara Liardet (SUI) | |
| 4 October | Best High Altitude MTB Cup | Turkey | XCO | Abdülkadir Kelleci (TUR); Azize Bekar (TUR) | Hugo Weiss (FRA) | Denis Sergiyenko (KAZ) | |
| 8–11 October | Marmotini Erciyes Stage Race | Turkey | XCS | Thibault Daniel (FRA); Semra Yetiş (TUR) | Clément Auvin (FRA); Zehra Kargin (TUR) | Abdülkadir Kelleci (TUR) | |
| 10 October | UCI MTB MARATHON SERIES – Capoliveri Legend Cup's Eleven | Italy | XCM | Martin Stošek (CZE); Elena Gaddoni (ITA) | Daniel Geismayr (AUT); Ariane Lüthi (SUI) | Samuele Porro (ITA); Debora Piana (ITA) | |
| 15–16 October | 2020 UCI Mountain Bike World Cup – DHI | Slovenia | DHI | Loris Vergier (FRA); Marine Cabirou (FRA) | Rémi Thirion (FRA); Myriam Nicole (FRA) | Thibaut Dapréla (FRA); Tracey Hannah (AUS) | |
| 17–18 October | 2020 UCI Mountain Bike World Cup – DHI | Slovenia | DHI | Loris Vergier (FRA); Nina Hoffmann (GER) | Loïc Bruni (FRA); Marine Cabirou (FRA) | Matt Walker (GBR); Eleonora Farina (ITA) | |
| 18 October | UCI MTB MARATHON SERIES – Latramun | Spain | XCM | Cristofer Bosque Ruano (ESP); Meritxell Figueras Garangou (ESP) | Hugo Drechou (FRA); Lara Lois García (ESP) | Benjamin Le Ny (FRA); María Diaz Pernía (ESP) | |
| 18 October | UCI MTB MARATHON SERIES | Turkey | XCM | Peeter Pruus (EST); Kataržina Sosna (LTU) | Onur Balkan (TUR); Semra Yetiş (TUR) | Shakir Adilov (KAZ); Rafiye Başat (TUR) | |
| 24–25 October | PROFFIX Swiss Bike Cup – XCC | Switzerland | XCC | Simon Vitzthum (SUI); Kathrin Stirnemann (SUI) | Vital Albin (SUI); Alessandra Keller (SUI) | Joel Roth (SUI); Linda Indergand (SUI) | |
| 29–30 October | 2020 UCI Mountain Bike World Cup – DHI | Portugal | DHI | Greg Minnaar (RSA); Myriam Nicole (FRA) | Matt Walker (GBR); Marine Cabirou (FRA) | Loïc Bruni (FRA); Tahnée Seagrave (GBR) | |
| 31 October | Alanya Avocado MTB Cup | Turkey | XCO | Dmytro Titarenko (UKR); Tereza Tvarůžková (CZE) | Hennadii Moiseiev (UKR); Viktoria Kirsanova (RUS) | Abdülkadir Kelleci (TUR); Blaža Klemenčič (SVN) | |
| 31 October | Copa Catalana Internacional BTT | Spain | XCO | Victor Koretzky (FRA); Malene Degn (DEN) | Milan Vader (NED); Sara Gay (ESP) | Hugo Drechou (FRA); Meritxell Figueras Garangou (ESP) | |
| 31 October–1 November | 2020 UCI Mountain Bike World Cup – DHI | Portugal | DHI | Loïc Bruni (FRA); Marine Cabirou (FRA) | Greg Minnaar (RSA); Nina Hoffmann (GER) | Matt Walker (GBR); Tahnée Seagrave (GBR) | |
| 31 October–1 November | Coupe du Japon International KYOTO Yubune Stage | Japan | XCC (Only for Men's)/XCO | Riki Kitabayashi (JPN) (XCC); Kohei Yamamoto (JPN); Urara Kawaguchi (JPN) | Ari Hirabayashi (JPN) (XCC); Riki Kitabayashi (JPN); Mio Suemasa (JPN) | Ryo Takeuchi (JPN) (XCC); Ari Hirabayashi (JPN); Yoko Hashiguchi (JPN) | |

=== November ===
| Date | Race Name | Location | UCI Rating | Winner | Second | Third | Ref |
|---|---|---|---|---|---|---|---|
| 1 November | Alanya MTB Cup | Turkey | XCO | Dmytro Titarenko (UKR); Tereza Tvarůžková (CZE) | Hennadii Moiseiev (UKR); Viktoria Kirsanova (RUS) | Jakub Kučera (CZE); Blaža Klemenčič (SVN) | |
| 6–8 November | Desafio dos Gigantes Internacional | Brazil | XCC | Martín Vidaurre Kossman (CHI); Letícia Jaqueline Soares Cândido (BRA) | Gustavo Xavier de Oliveira Pereira (BRA); Giuliana Salvini Morgen (BRA) | José Gabriel Marques de Almeida (BRA); Karen Fernandes Olimpio (BRA) | |
| 7 November | Prof. Dr. Cemil Taşcıoğlu MTB Cup | Turkey | XCO | Hugo Drechou (FRA); Tereza Tvarůžková (CZE) | Dmytro Titarenko (UKR); Viktoria Kirsanova (RUS) | Hennadii Moiseiev (UKR); Irina Slobodyan (UKR) | |
| 8 November | Incekum – Velo Alanya MTB CupB Cup | Turkey | XCO | Hugo Drechou (FRA); Tereza Tvarůžková (CZE) | Shlomi Haimy (ISR); Viktoria Kirsanova (RUS) | Hennadii Moiseiev (UKR); Ekaterina Kovalchuk (RUS) | |
| 14 November | Prof. Dr. Zeliha Öz MTB Cup | Turkey | XCO | Victor Koretzky (FRA); Tereza Tvarůžková (CZE) | Ruslan Boredskiy (RUS); Viktoria Kirsanova (RUS) | Nikolay Ivanov (RUS); Iryna Popova (UKR) | |
| 14 November | 2020 UCI Mountain Bike World Cup (XCE) | Spain | XCE | Jeroen van Eck (NED); Gaia Tormena (ITA) | Lorenzo Serres (FRA); Marion Fromberger (GER) | Simon Gegenheimer (GER); Sara Gay (ESP) | |
| 15 November | Theodora – Velo Alanya MTB Cup | Turkey | XCO | Victor Koretzky (FRA); Tereza Tvarůžková (CZE) | Hugo Drechou (FRA); Viktoria Kirsanova (RUS) | Hennadii Moiseiev (UKR); Darya Alexeeva (RUS) | |
| 20 November | Alanya Banana MTB Cup | Turkey | XCO | Shlomi Haimy (ISR); Tereza Tvarůžková (CZE) | Hennadii Moiseiev (UKR); Viktoria Kirsanova (RUS) | Hugo Drechou (FRA); Maria Sherstiuk (UKR) | |

== National Championships ==
| Nation | DH | XCO | END | XCE | XCM | XCR |
|---|---|---|---|---|---|---|
| (Australia) Australian National Championships | Troy Brosnan; Sian A'Hern | Daniel McConnell; Rebecca McConnell | Josh Carlson; Beverley Anderson | | | |
| (Austria) Austrian National Championship | David Trummer; Valentina Höll | Karl Markt; Laura Stigger | | Theo Hauser; Cornelia Holland | Alban Lakata; Sabine Sommer | |
| (Belarus) Belarusian National Championship | | Gleb Moshenkov; Alina Kolesnikova | | Dainis Bricis; Tatyana Sovpel | | |
| (Belgium) Belgian National Championships | | | | | Timo Kielich; Joyce Vanderbeken | |
| Bermuda National Championships | | Robin Horsfield | | | | |
| (Bosnia and Herzegovina) Bosnia & Herzegovina National Championship | | Vedad Karić; Lejla Tanović | | Vedad Karić; Lejla Tanović | Vedad Karić; Lejla Tanović | |
| (Brazil) Brazilian National Championship | | Henrique Avancini; Raiza Goulão | | | | |
| (Bulgaria) Bulgarian MTB National Championships | Stivian Gatev; Izabela Yankova | Aleksandar Aleksiev; Joana Vylkanova | Alexandra Kouzova | | | |
| Chinese Taipei National Championship | Chiang Sheng-shan; Chou Pei-ni | Chiang Sheng-shan; Tsai Ya-yu | | | | |
| Chile National Championship | | Nicolás Delich Pardo; Evelyn Muñoz Jaramillo | | | | |
| (Colombia) Colombian National Championship | Camilo Sánchez; Jineth Berdugo | Fabio Castañeda; Leidy Mera | | | | |
| (Costa Rica) Costa Rican National Championship | Conrad Haehner; Dorian Marcela Canet Láscarez | Jonathan Quesada; Milagro Mena | | | Jonathan Quesada; Milagro Mena | |
| (Croatia) Croatian National Championship | Alen Smolić | Matija Meštrić; Karmen Škiljić | | | | |
| Cyprus National Championship | Andreas Theodorou | Andreas Miltiadis | | | | |
| (Czech Republic) Czech National Championships | Simon Maurer; Dominika Durčáková | Ondřej Cink; Jitka Čábelická | Matěj Charvát; Kristýna Havlická | | Ondřej Cink; Jana Czeczinkarová | |
| (Denmark) Danish National Championship | | Simon Andreassen; Annika Langvad | | | Sebastian Carstensen | |
| (Estonia) Estonian National Championships | Tanel Tõrvik; Maaris Meier | Peeter Pruus; Janika Lõiv | | | Peeter Pruus; Mari-Liis Mõttus | |
| (El Salvador) Salvadoran National Championship | José Sosa; Mariana Salazar | | | | | |
| (Finland) Finnish National Championship | Tarmo Ryynänen; Salli Saimovaara | Niko Heikkilä; Sini Alusniemi | | Sakari Lehtinen; Kajsa Salmela | Henri Ojala; Jenni Korhonen | |
| (France) French National Championship | Benoît Coulanges; Myriam Nicole | Jordan Sarrou; Lena Gerault | Théo Galy; Morgane Charre | Titouan Perrin-Ganier; Manon Wimmer | Hugo Drechou; Lena Gerault | |
| (Germany) German National Championship | Max Hartenstern; Nina Hoffmann | Maximilian Brandl; Elisabeth Brandau | | | David List; Nadine Rieder | |
| Greece National Championship | | Periklis Ilias; Varvara Fasoi | | Periklis Ilias; Alexandra Adam | Periklis Ilias | Periklis Ilias; Aikaterini Eleftheriadou |
| (Guatemala) Guatemalan National Championship | Marvin Alberto Spiegeler Barrera; Astrid Samayoa Mendez | | Guillermo Orantes | | | |
| (Hungary) Hungarian National Championship | Sándor Marcell Ferenczi; Lilla Megyaszai | András Parti; Kata Blanka Vas | | | Zsombor Palumby; Kata Blanka Vas | |
| (Iceland) Icelandic National Championships | Gestur Jonsson; Emilia Niewada | Ingvar Ómarsson; María Ögn Guðmundsdóttir | | | Ingvar Ómarsson; Karen Axelsdóttir | |
| (Israel) Israeli National Championship | | Shlomi Haimy; Na'ama Noyman | | | Guy Sagiv; Omer Shapira | |
| (Italy) Italian National Championships | Davide Palazzari; Eleonora Farina | Luca Braidot; Eva Lechner | Loris Revelli; Laura Rossin | | Samuele Porro; Elena Gaddoni | |
| (Japan) Japanese National Championship | Kazuki Shimizu; Michie Iwasaki | Kohei Yamamoto; Miho Imai | | Norio Sawaki; Urara Kawaguchi | | |
| Lesotho National Championships | | Tumelo Makae; Tebello Mofa | | | | |
| (Latvia) Latvian National Championships | | Mārtiņš Blūms; Katrīna Jaunslaviete-Kipure | | | Oskars Muižnieks; Katrīna Jaunslaviete-Kipure | |
| (Lithuania) Lithuanian National Championships | Tomas Pečiukaitis | Šarūnas Pacevičius; Kataržina Sosna | | | Šarūnas Pacevičius; Kataržina Sosna | |
| (Luxembourg) Luxembourgish National Championship | | Sören Nissen; Fabienne Schauss | | | | |
| Mexico National Championship | | José Gerardo Ulloa; Daniela Campuzano | | | | |
| (Moldova) Moldovan National Championships | | Cristian Raileanu; Ecaterina Mogîldea | | | | |
| (Namibia) Namibian National Championships | | Alex Miller; Michelle Vorster | | | Alex Miller; Michelle Vorster | |
| (Netherlands) Dutch National Championship | | Milan Vader; Anne Terpstra | | | | |
| New Zealand National Championships | Sam Blenkinsop; Jessica Blewitt | Anton Cooper; Josie Wilcox | | | | |
| (Norway) Norwegian National Championship | Ole-Herman Bergby; Mille Johnset | Erik Hægstad; Elisabeth Sveum | | | Emil Hasund Eid; Hildegunn Gjertrud Hovdenak | |
| Panama National Championships | | Christofer Jurado; Anabel Rodríguez | | | | |
| (Paraguay) Paraguayan National Championships | | Roberto Félix Quiroga; Sara Torres | | Lucas Bogado; Silvia Rodas | | |
| (Poland) Polish National Championships | Sławomir Łukasik; Inka Januła | Krzysztof Łukasik; Maja Włoszczowska | | | Adrian Brzózka; Barbara Borowiecka | |
| (Portugal) Portuguese National Championship | Gonçalo Bandeira; Margarida Bandeira | Roberto Ferreira; Raquel Queirós | | Roberto Ferreira; Raquel Queirós | Tiago Ferreira; Melissa Maia | |
| (Romania) Romanian National Championships | | Vlad Dascălu; Eszter Bereczki | | Ede Molnár; Eszter Bereczki | | |
| (Russia) Russian National Championship | | Timofei Ivanov; Viktoria Kirsanova | | Ivan Filatov; Elvira Khayrullina | Ruslan Boredskiy; Elvira Khayrullina | |
| (Serbia) Serbian National Championship | | Aleksandar Roman; Jovana Crnogorac | | | | |
| (Slovakia) Slovak National Championships | Adam Rojček; Simona Kuchyňková | Martin Haring; Janka Keseg Števková | Šimon Rus; Simona Kuchyňková | Filip Sklenárik; Radka Paulechová | Martin Haring; Janka Keseg Števková | |
| (Slovenia) Slovenian National Championship | Žak Gomilšček; Monica Hrastnik | Rok Naglič; Tanja Žakelj | | | | |
| (South Africa) South African National Championship | Johann Potgieter; Francis Du Toit | Alan Hatherly; Mariske Strauss | | | | |
| (Spain) Spanish National Championships | Ángel Suárez Alonso; Telma Torregrosa Sancho | David Valero; Rocío García | Gabriel Torralba; Sara Gay Moreno | | | |
| (Sweden) Swedish National Championships | | Emil Lindgren; Jenny Rissveds | | | | |
| (Switzerland) Swiss National Championships | Lutz Weber; Camille Balanche | Nino Schurter; Jolanda Neff | | | Martin Fanger; Steffi Häberlin | |
| (Thailand) Thai National Championships | Methasit Boonsane; Tida Panyawan | Adisak Tailangkha; Supaksorn Nuntana | | | | |
| (Turkey) Turkish National Championship | | Abdülkadir Kelleci; Esra Kürkçü Akgönül | | | | |
| (Ukraine) Ukrainian National Championships | | Hennadii Moiseiev; Iryna Popova | | Oleksandr Gudyma; Iryna Popova | | |
| Venezuela National Championship | | Yonathan Mejia; Yngrid Porras | | | | |

== Continental Championships ==
| Championships | Race | Winner | Second | Third |
|---|---|---|---|---|
| Oceania Mountain Bike Continental Championship; Australia January 24–25 | XCO | Anton Cooper (NZL); Rebecca McConnell (AUS) | Cameron Ivory (AUS); Josie Wilcox (NZL) | Daniel McConnell (AUS); Holly Harris (AUS) |
| Oceania Mountain Bike Continental Championship; Australia January 24–25 | XCO U23 | Cameron Jones (NZL); Zoe Cuthbert (AUS) | Josh Burnett (NZL); Sammie Maxwell (NZL) | Matthew Dinham (AUS); Jessica Manchester (NZL) |
| Oceania Mountain Bike Continental Championship; Australia January 24–25 | DH | Sam Blenkinsop (NZL); Sian A'Hern (AUS) | Sam Gale (NZL); Jessica Blewitt (NZL) | Dean Lucas (AUS); Shania Rawson (NZL) |
| Asian Mountain Bike Continental Championships; Thailand February 1–5 | DH | Methasit Boonsane (THA); Siraphatson Chatkamnoed (THA) | Chinnapat Sukchanya (THA); Tida Panyawan (THA) | Suebsakun Sukchanya (THA); Vipavee Deekaballes (THA) |
| Asian Mountain Bike Continental Championships; Thailand February 1–5 | XCE | Zaenal Fanani (INA); Warinthorn Phetpraphan (THA) | Keerati Sukprasart (THA); Supaksorn Nuntana (THA) | Phunsiri Sirimongkhon (THA); Natalie Panyawan (THA) |
| Asian Mountain Bike Continental Championships; Thailand February 1–5 | XCO | Kohei Yamamoto (JPN); Yao Bianwa (CHN) | Seiya Hirano (JPN); Yao Ping (CHN) | Peerapol Chawchiangkwang (THA); Faranak Partoazar (IRI) |
| Asian Mountain Bike Continental Championships; Thailand February 1–5 | XCO U23 | Lü Xianjing (CHN); Natalie Panyawan (THA) | Denis Sergiyenko (KAZ); Urara Kawaguchi (JPN) | Koutarou Murakami (JPN); Surattiya Buppha (THA) |
| Asian Mountain Bike Continental Championships; Thailand February 1–5 | XCR | Japan; Riki Kitabayashi; Kohei Yamamoto; Issei Matsumoto; Miho Imai; Urara Kawaguchi | Thailand; Keerati Sukprasart; Supaksorn Nuntana; Athiphong Suwannasing; Phunsiri Sirimongkhon; Natalie Panyawan | Kazakhstan; Alina Sarkulova; Temirlan Mukhamediyanov; Zarina Bikmayeva; Damir Tursunkali; Shakir Adilov |
| 2020 UCI Mountain Bike World Championships; Austria October 5–11 | XCO | Jordan Sarrou (FRA); Pauline Ferrand-Prévot (FRA) | Mathias Flückiger (SUI); Eva Lechner (ITA) | Titouan Carod (FRA); Rebecca McConnell (AUS) |
| 2020 UCI Mountain Bike World Championships; Austria October 5–11 | U23 XCO | Tom Pidcock (GBR); Loana Lecomte (FRA) | Christopher Blevins (USA); Kata Blanka Vas (HUN) | Joel Roth (SUI); Ceylin del Carmen Alvarado (NED) |
| 2020 UCI Mountain Bike World Championships; Austria October 5–11 | DHI | Reece Wilson (GBR); Camille Balanche (SUI) | David Trummer (AUT); Myriam Nicole (FRA) | Rémi Thirion (FRA); Monika Hrastnik (SVN) |
| 2020 UCI Mountain Bike World Championships; Austria October 5–11 | E-MTB | Tom Pidcock (GBR); Mélanie Pugin (FRA) | Jérôme Gilloux (FRA); Kathrin Stirnemann (SUI) | Simon Andreassen (DEN); Nathalie Schneitter (SUI) |
| 2020 UCI Mountain Bike World Championships; Austria October 5–11 | XCO Team | France; Mathius Azzaro; Luca Martin; Loana Lecomte; Léna Gérault; Olivia Onesti; Jordan Sarrou | Italy; Luca Braidot; Eva Lechner; Filippo Agostinacchio; Nicole Pesse; Marika Tovo; Juri Zanotti | Switzerland; Luke Wiedmann; Thomas Litscher; Sina Frei; Noëlle Buri; Elisa Alvarez; Alexandre Balmer |
| European Mountain Bike Continental Championship; Switzerland October 15–18 | XCO | Nino Schurter (SUI); Pauline Ferrand-Prévot (FRA) | Titouan Carod (FRA); Anne Terpstra (NED) | Mathias Flückiger (SUI); Yana Belomoyna (UKR) |
| European Mountain Bike Continental Championship; Switzerland October 15–18 | U23 XCO | Joel Roth (SUI); Loana Lecomte (FRA) | Vital Albin (SUI); Marika Tovo (ITA) | Juri Zanotti (ITA); Viktoria Kirsanova (RUS) |
| European Mountain Bike Continental Championship; Switzerland October 15–18 | XCE | Titouan Perrin-Ganier (FRA); Gaia Tormena (ITA) | Jeroen van Eck (NED); Linda Indergand (SUI) | Hugo Briatta (FRA); Marion Fromberger (GER) |
| European Mountain Bike Continental Championship; Switzerland October 15–18 | XCO Team Relay | Italy; Luca Braidot; Eva Lechner; Filippo Agostinacchio; Nicole Pesse; Marika Tovo; Juri Zanotti | France; Mathis Azzaro; Luca Martin; Loana Lecomte; Olivia Onesti; Léna Gérault; Jordan Sarrou | Switzerland; Fabio Püntener; Janis Baumann; Alessandra Keller; Noëlle Buri; Elisa Alvarez; Thomas Litscher |
| UCI Mountain Bike Marathon World Championships; Turkey October 24–25 | XCM | Héctor Leonardo Páez (COL); Ramona Forchini (SUI) | Tiago Ferreira (POR); Maja Włoszczowska (POL) | Martin Stošek (CZE); Ariane Lüthi (SUI) |
| UCI Mountain Bike Eliminator World Championships; Belgium October 25 | XCM | Titouan Perrin-Ganier (FRA); Isaure Medde (FRA) | Simon Gegenheimer (GER); Gaia Tormena (ITA) | Anton Olstam (SWE); Fem van Empel (NED) |
