= Cycling at the 2023 European Games – Women's cross-country =

Women's cross-country at the 2023 European Games
- Venue: Krynica-Zdrój Hill Park
- Date: 25 June
- Competitors: 54 from 20 nations
- Winning time: 1:18:26

Medalists
gold medal	Puck Pieterse	Netherlands
silver medal	Mona Mitterwallner	Austria
bronze medal	Sina Frei	Switzerland

The women's cross-country mountain biking event at the 2023 European Games took place on 25 June 2023 at the Krynica-Zdrój Hill Park. The event will feature 56 cyclists representing 20 nations.

== Competition format ==
The competition is a mass-start, five-lap race. There is only one round of competition. The mountain bike course is 3.9 kilometres (2.4 mi) long, with sudden changes in elevation, narrow dirt trails, and rocky sections.

== Results ==
Rank	#	Cyclist	Nation	Time	Diff.
1st place, gold medalist(s)	11	Puck Pieterse	Netherlands	1:18:26	
2nd place, silver medalist(s)	7	Mona Mitterwallner	Austria	1:18:52	+0:26
3rd place, bronze medalist(s)	13	Sina Frei	Switzerland	1:19:31	+1:05
4	6	Jolanda Neff	Switzerland	1:19:46	+1:20
5	1	Loana Lecomte	France	1:20:03	+1:37
6	4	Anne Terpstra	Netherlands	1:20:05	+1:39
7	8	Caroline Bohé	Denmark	1:20:17	+1:51
8	12	Laura Stigger	Austria	1:20:37	+2:11
9	24	Steffi Häberlin	Switzerland	1:21:14	+2:48
10	48	Fem van Empel	Netherlands	1:21:14	+2:48
11	15	Linda Indergand	Switzerland	1:21:34	+3:08
12	9	Giada Specia	Italy	1:21:51	+3:25
13	10	Janika Lõiv	Estonia	1:22:07	+3:41
14	31	Nicole Koller	Switzerland	1:22:22	+3:56
15	5	Martina Berta	Italy	1:22:31	+4:05
16	14	Emeline Detilleux	Belgium	1:22:39	+4:13
17	18	Malene Degn	Denmark	1:22:53	+4:27
18	27	Leonie Daubermann	Germany	1:22:59	+4:33
19	3	Pauline Ferrand-Prévot	France	1:23:10	+4:44
20	54	Ceylin del Carmen Alvarado	Netherlands	1:24:05	+5:39
21	38	Aleksandra Podgórska	Poland	1:24:24	+5:58
22	37	Nina Benz	Germany	1:24:44	+6:18
23	29	Ramona Forchini	Switzerland	1:24:48	+6:22
24	21	Yana Belomoina	Ukraine	1:24:50	+6:24
25	40	Ronja Eibl	Germany	1:25:24	+6:58
26	22	Chiara Teocchi	Italy	1:25:44	+7:18
27	36	Lia Schrievers	Germany	1:26:20	+7:54
28	23	Jitka Čábelická	Czech Republic	1:26:33	+8:07
29	34	Lotte Koopmans	Netherlands	1:26:48	+8:22
30	25	Virág Buzsáki	Hungary	1:27:06	+8:40
31	30	Vita Movrin	Slovenia	1:27:32	+9:06
32	32	Ingrid Bøe Jacobsen	Norway	1:27:32	+9:06
33	33	Paula Gorycka	Poland	1:28:12	+9:46
34	42	Jana Czeczinkarová	Czech Republic	1:28:59	+10:33
35	50	Zuzanna Krzystała	Poland	1:29:33	+11:07
36	43	Klaudia Czabok	Poland	1:29:57	+11:31
37	19	Raquel Queirós	Portugal	1:30:51	+12:25
38	44	Theresia Schwenk	Germany	1:31:29	+13:03
39	49	Gabriela Wojtyła	Poland	1:33:12	+14:46
40	17	Tanja Žakelj	Slovenia	1:34:03	+15:37
41	28	Naama Noyman	Israel	-1 LAP	
42	56	Martina Krahulcová	Slovakia	-1 LAP	
43	46	Mari-Liis Mõttus	Estonia	-1 LAP	
44	55	Iryna Slobodyan	Ukraine	-1 LAP	
45	35	Githa Michiels	Belgium	-1 LAP	
46	39	Núria Bosch	Spain	-1 LAP	
47	47	Corina Druml	Austria	-1 LAP	
48	53	Merili Sirvel	Estonia	-1 LAP	
49	51	Janka Keseg Števková	Slovakia	-2 LAP	
50	45	Natalia Fischer	Spain	-2 LAP	
51	57	Klaudia Cichacka	Poland	-2 LAP	
52	58	Karolina Mikołajewska	Poland	-2 LAP	
	20	Annie Last	Great Britain	DNF3	
	52	Antonina Białek	Poland	DNF3	
	16	Anne Tauber	Netherlands	DNS	
