= Cycling at the 2015 European Games – Men's cross country =

The men's cross-country cycling event at the 2015 European Games in Baku took place at Mountain Bike Velopark on 13 June.

== Result ==
Rank	Rider	Nation	Time
Gold medal	Nino Schurter	Switzerland	1:41:04
Silver medal	Lukas Flückiger	Switzerland	1:41:17
Bronze medal	Fabian Giger	Switzerland	1:41:37
4	Gerhard Kerschbaumer	Italy	1:42:50
5	Ondřej Cink	Czech Republic	1:43:38
6	Sergio Mantecón Gutiérrez	Spain	1:43:59
7	Carlos Coloma Nicolás	Spain	1:44:08
8	Maxime Marotte	France	1:44:28
9	Marco Aurelio Fontana	Italy	1:45:11
10	David Rosa	Portugal	1:45:12
11	Martin Loo	Estonia	1:46:21
12	Marek Konwa	Poland	1:47:36
13	Jordan Sarrou	France	1:48:16
14	Gregor Raggl	Austria	1:48:16
15	Matthias Wengelin	Sweden	1:48:17
16	Sergji Rysenko	Ukraine	1:48:37
17	Zsolt Juhász	Hungary	1:48:56
18	Shlomi Haimy	Israel	1:49:18
19	Arnis Pētersons	Latvia	1:50:04
20	Emil Lindgren	Sweden	1:51:00
21	Hugo Drechou	France	1:51:33
22	Christian Helmig	Luxembourg	1:51:38
23	Sven Nys	Belgium	1:52:31
24	Sondre Kristiansen	Norway	LAP
25	Abdülkadir Kelleci	Turkey	LAP
26	František Lami	Slovakia	LAP
27	Dimitrios Antoniadis	Greece	LAP
28	Michal Lami	Slovakia	LAP
29	Anders Bregnhøj Jensen	Denmark	LAP
30	Gregor Krajnc	Slovenia	LAP
31	Jukka Vastaranta	Finland	LAP
32	Filip Turk	Croatia	LAP
33	Lucian Logigan	Romania	LAP
34	Andreas Miltiadis	Cyprus	LAP
35	Demir Mulić	Montenegro	LAP
36	Aleksa Crnčević	Bosnia and Herzegovina	LAP
37	Besik Gavasheli	Georgia	LAP
38	Agshin Ismayilov	Azerbaijan	LAP
	José Antonio Hermida	Spain	DNF
	Michiel van der Heijden	Netherlands	DNF
	Andrea Tiberi	Italy	DNF
	Jeff Luyten	Belgium	DNF
	Orkhan Mammadov	Azerbaijan	DNF
