= Cycling at the 2020 Summer Olympics – Women's cross-country =

Olympic cycling event

Women's cross-country at the Games of the XXXII Olympiad
- Olympic mountain bike cycling
- Venue: Izu MTB Course
- Date: 27 July 2021
- Competitors: 38 from 29 nations

Medalists
1st place, gold medalist(s)		Jolanda Neff	Switzerland
2nd place, silver medalist(s)		Sina Frei	Switzerland
3rd place, bronze medalist(s)		Linda Indergand	Switzerland

The women's cross-country mountain biking event at the 2020 Summer Olympics took place on 27 July 2021 at the Izu MTB Course, Izu, Shizuoka. 38 cyclists from 29 nations were expected to compete, but only 37 did. The race ended in all three medals won by Swiss athletes, the first medal sweep in Olympic cycling history.

== Background ==
This was the 7th appearance of the event, which has been held at every Summer Olympics since mountain bike cycling was added to the programme in 1996.

The reigning Olympic champion was Jenny Rissveds of Sweden, and the reigning (2020) World Champion was Pauline Ferrand-Prévot of France.

A preview by Olympics.com noted the favourites as Rissveds, Kate Courtney of the United States (2018 World Champion and 2019 World Cup series winner), Jolanda Neff and Sina Frei of Switzerland (test event winner and runner-up), and Pauline Ferrand-Prévot (2019 & 2020 World Champion).

== Qualification ==
A National Olympic Committee (NOC) could enter up to 3 qualified cyclists in the cross-country. Quota places are allocated to the NOC, which selects the cyclists. Qualification is primarily through the UCI nation rankings, with 30 of the 38 quota places available through that pathway. The top 2 NOCs earned 3 quota places. NOCs ranked 3rd through 7th earned 2 quota places. NOCs ranked 8th through 21st earned 1 quota places. The second path to qualification was continental tournaments for Africa, the Americas, and Asia; the top NOC at each tournament (which had not already earned a quota place) received 1 place. The third path was the 2019 UCI Mountain Bike World Championships. The top 2 NOCs (without a quota place yet) in the Elite category earned a place; the top 2 NOCs in the U-23 category (without a quota, including through the Elite category) also earned a place. The host nation was reserved one place, to be reallocated through the rankings if Japan earned a place normally. Because qualification was complete by the end of the 2020 UCI Track Cycling World Championships on 1 March 2020 (the last event that contributed to the 2018–20 rankings), qualification was unaffected by the COVID-19 pandemic.

== Competition format ==
The competition is a mass-start, five-lap race. There is only one round of competition. The mountain bike course is 4.1 kilometres (2.5 mi) long, with sudden changes in elevation, narrow dirt trails, and rocky sections. The vertical height is 150 metres (490 ft). Riders with times 80% slower than the leader's first lap are eliminated.

== Results ==
Result
Rank	#	Cyclist	Nation	Time	Diff.
1st place, gold medalist(s)	4	Jolanda Neff	Switzerland	1:15:46	
2nd place, silver medalist(s)	7	Sina Frei	Switzerland	1:16:57	+ 1:11
3rd place, bronze medalist(s)	19	Linda Indergand	Switzerland	1:17:05	+ 1:19
4	33	Blanka Vas	Hungary	1:17:55	+ 2:09
5	3	Anne Terpstra	Netherlands	1:18:21	+ 2:35
6	5	Loana Lecomte	France	1:18:43	+ 2:57
7	14	Evie Richards	Great Britain	1:19:09	+ 3:23
8	9	Yana Belomoyna	Ukraine	1:19:40	+ 3:54
9	15	Haley Batten	United States	1:20:13	+ 4:27
10	1	Pauline Ferrand-Prévot	France	1:20:18	+ 4:32
11	12	Anne Tauber	Netherlands	1:20:18	+ 4:32
12	30	Malene Degn	Denmark	1:20:34	+ 4:48
13	27	Caroline Bohé	Denmark	1:20:57	+ 5:11
14	11	Jenny Rissveds	Sweden	1:21:28	+ 5:42
15	6	Kate Courtney	United States	1:22:19	+ 6:33
16	17	Daniela Campuzano	Mexico	1:22:50	+ 7:04
17	10	Janika Lõiv	Estonia	1:23:17	+ 7:31
18	20	Catharine Pendrel	Canada	1:23:47	+ 8:01
19	25	Ronja Eibl	Germany	1:23:59	+ 8:13
20	21	Maja Włoszczowska	Poland	1:24:25	+ 8:39
21	23	Tanja Žakelj	Slovenia	1:24:38	+ 8:52
22	22	Jitka Čábelická	Czech Republic	1:25:00	+ 9:14
23	31	Sofía Gómez Villafañe	Argentina	1:25:13	+ 9:27
24	28	Candice Lill	South Africa	1:26:20	+ 10:34
25	8	Eva Lechner	Italy	1:26:26	+ 10:40
26	18	Rocío del Alba García	Spain	1:26:32	+ 10:46
27	34	Raquel Queirós	Portugal	1:27:46	+ 12:00
28	2	Rebecca McConnell	Australia	1:30:29	+ 14:43
29	29	Haley Smith	Canada	—	-1 LAP
30	36	Viktoria Kirsanova	ROC	—	-1 LAP
31	24	Erin Huck	United States	—	-1 LAP
32	26	Elisabeth Brandau	Germany	—	-1 LAP
33	13	Githa Michiels	Belgium	—	-2 LAP
34	38	Yao Bianwa	China	—	-2 LAP
35	32	Jaqueline Mourão	Brazil	—	-2 LAP
36	37	Michelle Vorster	Namibia	—	-3 LAP
37	35	Miho Imai	Japan	—	-3 LAP
—	16	Laura Stigger	Austria	DNF	
