= Cycling at the 2024 Summer Olympics – Women's cross-country =

Women's cross-country at the Games of the XXXIII Olympiad
- Olympic mountain bike cycling
- Venue: Colline d'Élancourt
- Date: 28 July 2024
- Competitors: 36 from 28 nations

Medalists
1st place, gold medalist(s)		Pauline Ferrand-Prévot	France
2nd place, silver medalist(s)		Haley Batten	United States
3rd place, bronze medalist(s)		Jenny Rissveds	Sweden

The women's cross-country mountain biking event at the 2024 Summer Olympics took place on 28 July 2024 at Colline d'Élancourt (Elancourt Hill) which is the highest point in the Paris region. 36 cyclists from 28 nations competed.

== Background ==
This was the 8th appearance of the event, which has been held at every Summer Olympics since mountain bike cycling was added to the programme in 1996.

The reigning Olympic champion was Jolanda Neff of Switzerland; however, she chose not to defend her title due to illness.

== Competition format ==
The competition is a mass-start, seven-lap race. There is only one round of competition. The mountain bike course is 4.4 kilometres (2.7 mi) long, with sudden changes in elevation, narrow dirt trails, and rocky sections. Riders that are lapped or are slower than 80% of the race leader’s time are eliminated.

== Results ==
Result
Rank	#	Cyclist	Nation	Time	Diff.
1st place, gold medalist(s)	4	Pauline Ferrand-Prévot	France	1:26:02	
2nd place, silver medalist(s)	11	Haley Batten	United States	1:28:59	+2:57
3rd place, bronze medalist(s)	12	Jenny Rissveds	Sweden	1:29:04	+3:02
4	3	Puck Pieterse	Netherlands	1:29:25	+3:23
5	13	Evie Richards	Great Britain	1:29:29	+3:27
6	10	Laura Stigger	Austria	1:30:15	+4:13
7	2	Alessandra Keller	Switzerland	1:30:43	+4:41
8	15	Sammie Maxwell	New Zealand	1:30:43	+4:41
9	18	Anne Terpstra	Netherlands	1:31:35	+5:33
10	35	Blanka Vas	Hungary	1:31:42	+5:40
11	21	Chiara Teocchi	Italy	1:31:52	+5:50
12	6	Savilia Blunk	United States	1:31:52	+5:50
13	14	Rebecca Henderson	Australia	1:32:44	+6:42
14	7	Martina Berta	Italy	1:32:50	+6:48
15	19	Caroline Bohe	Denmark	1:33:11	+7:09
16	22	Nina Benz	Germany	1:33:43	+7:41
17	28	Isabella Holmgren	Canada	1:33:43	+7:41
18	8	Mona Mitterwallner	Austria	1:34:44	+8:42
19	17	Janika Lõiv	Estonia	1:35:05	+9:03
20	9	Candice Lill	South Africa	1:35:33	+9:31
21	23	Sina Frei	Switzerland	1:35:34	+9:32
22	34	Wu Zhifan	China	1:36:07	+10:05
23	31	Ella Maclean-Howell	Great Britain	1:36:26	+10:24
24	24	Sofie Heby Pedersen	Denmark	—	-1 LAP
25	27	Emeline Detilleux	Belgium	—	-1 LAP
26	16	Yana Belomoina	Ukraine	—	-1 LAP
27	20	Paula Gorycka	Poland	—	-2 LAP
28	29	Raiza Goulão	Brazil	—	-2 LAP
29	26	Raquel Queiros	Portugal	—	-2 LAP
30	30	Tanja Žakelj	Slovenia	—	-2 LAP
31	25	Adéla Holubová	Czech Republic	—	-2 LAP
32	33	Urara Kawaguchi	Japan	—	-3 LAP
33	32	Érika Monserrath Rodríguez Suárez	Mexico	—	-4 LAP
34	37	Jazilla Mwamikazi	Rwanda	—	-5 LAP
—	5	Loana Lecomte	France	DNF	
—	36	Aurelie Halbwachs	Mauritius	DNF	
