= Cycling at the 2018 Asian Games – Women's cross-country =

Women's cross-country at the 2018 Asian Games
- Venue: Khe Bun Hill
- Date: 21 August 2018
- Competitors: 12 from 8 nations

Medalists
gold medal	Yao Bianwa	China
silver medal	Li Hongfeng	China
bronze medal	Natalie Panyawan	Thailand

The women's cross country competition at the 2018 Asian Games was held on 21 August 2018 at the Khe Bun Hill in Subang Regency.

== Schedule ==
All times are Western Indonesia Time (UTC+07:00)

Date	Time	Event
Monday, 21 August 2018	10:00	Final

== Results ==
Legend

- DNF — Did not finish

Rank	Athlete	Time
1st place, gold medalist(s)	Yao Bianwa (CHN)	1:20:17
2nd place, silver medalist(s)	Li Hongfeng (CHN)	1:24:56
3rd place, bronze medalist(s)	Natalie Panyawan (THA)	1:26:11
4	Faranak Partoazar (IRI)	1:29:24
5	Tsai Ya-yu (TPE)	1:30:53
6	Siriluck Warapiang (THA)	1:34:22
7	Rohidah (INA)	1:36:40
8	Noviana (INA)	−1 lap
9	Chou Pei-ni (TPE)	−1 lap
10	Laxmi Magar (NEP)	−2 laps
—	Ariana Dormitorio (PHI)	DNF
—	Gantogtokhyn Enkhjin (MGL)	DNF
