= Piotr Brzózka =

Polish cross-country mountain biker

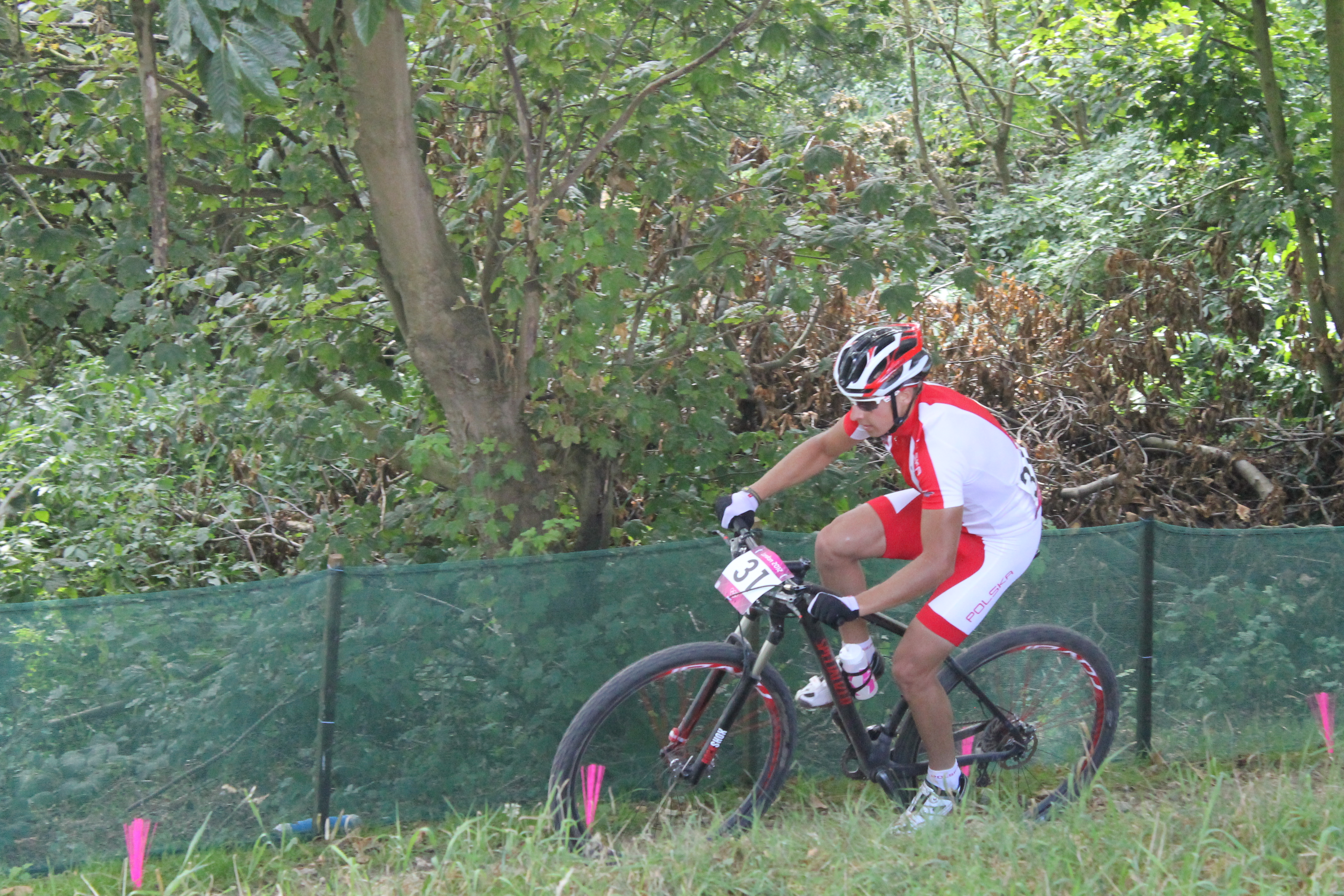
Piotr Brzózka at the 2012 Summer Olympics

Piotr Brzózka (born 14 October 1989) is a Polish cross-country mountain biker. At the 2012 Summer Olympics, he competed in the Men's cross-country at Hadleigh Farm, finishing in 32nd place.
