= Tong Weisong =

Chinese cross-country mountain biker

Tong Weisong (born 30 January 1988) is a Chinese cross-country mountain biker. At the 2012 Summer Olympics, he competed in the Men's cross-country at Hadleigh Farm for the People's Republic of China. He placed 41st.
