= Cycling at the 2012 Summer Olympics – Men's cross-country =

Men's cross-country cycling at the Games of the XXX Olympiad
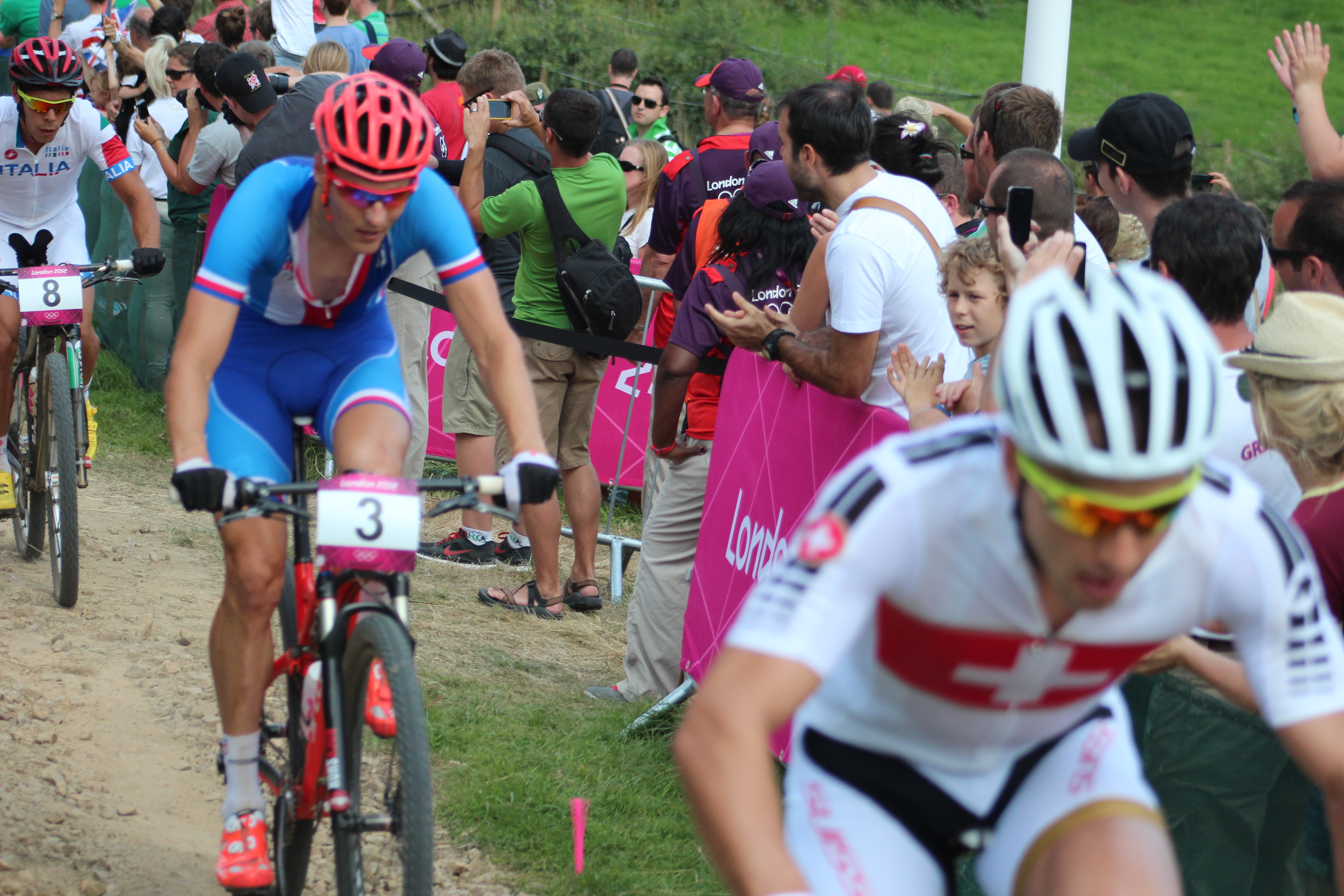
- Trio of future medal winners – left to right: Marco Aurelio Fontana, Jaroslav Kulhavý and Nino Schurter
- Venue: Hadleigh Farm
- Date: 12 August
- Competitors: 47 from 31 nations
- Winning time: 1:29:07

Medalists
1st place, gold medalist(s)		Jaroslav Kulhavý	Czech Republic
2nd place, silver medalist(s)		Nino Schurter	Switzerland
3rd place, bronze medalist(s)		Marco Aurelio Fontana	Italy

The men's cross-country cycling event at the 2012 Olympic Games in London took place at Hadleigh Farm on 12 August.

Fifty cyclists from 32 countries competed. Jaroslav Kulhavý from the Czech Republic won the gold medal, beating Switzerland's Nino Schurter by one second.

== Format ==
The competition began at 1:30 pm with a mass start and involved a set number of laps (determined the day before the competition) around the 4.8 km course at Hadleigh Farm in Essex. The distance of the race was 34.1 km.

== Schedule ==
All times are British Summer Time

Date	Time	Round
Sunday 12 August 2012	13:30	Final

== Result ==
The entry list was published on 26 July.

Rank	Rider	Country	Time
1st place, gold medalist(s)	Jaroslav Kulhavý	Czech Republic	1:29:07
2nd place, silver medalist(s)	Nino Schurter	Switzerland	1:29:08
3rd place, bronze medalist(s)	Marco Aurelio Fontana	Italy	1:29:32
4	José Antonio Hermida	Spain	1:29:36
5	Burry Stander	South Africa	1:29:37
6	Carlos Coloma Nicolás	Spain	1:30:07
7	Manuel Fumic	Germany	1:30:31
8	Geoff Kabush	Canada	1:30:43
9	Alexander Gehbauer	Austria	1:31:16
10	Todd Wells	United States	1:31:28
11	Stéphane Tempier	France	1:31:30
12	Jan Škarnitzl	Czech Republic	1:31:48
13	Gerhard Kerschbaumer	Italy	1:32:02
14	Ondřej Cink	Czech Republic	1:32:16
15	Samuel Schultz	United States	1:32:29
16	Marek Konwa	Poland	1:32:41
17	Rudi van Houts	Netherlands	1:32:53
18	Ralph Näf	Switzerland	1:32:58
19	Kevin van Hoovels	Belgium	1:33:01
20	Karl Markt	Austria	1:33:18
21	Daniel McConnell	Australia	1:33:22
22	Sergio Mantecón Gutiérrez	Spain	1:33:46
23	David Rosa	Portugal	1:33:50
24	Rubens Valeriano	Brazil	1:34:23
25	Florian Vogel	Switzerland	1:34:36
26	Catriel Soto	Argentina	1:35:13
27	Kohei Yamamoto	Japan	1:35:26
28	Héctor Leonardo Páez	Colombia	1:36:02
29	Jean-Christophe Péraud	France	1:37:07
30	Marc Bassingthwaighte	Namibia	1:37:17
31	Sergiy Rysenko	Ukraine	1:37:32
32	Piotr Brzózka	Poland	1:38:37
33	Periklis Ilias	Greece	1:38:51
34	Moritz Milatz	Germany	1:38:59
35	Philip Buys	South Africa	1:40:11
36	Paolo Montoya	Costa Rica	1:41:19
37	Evgeniy Pechenin	Russia	1:41:40
38	Chan Chun Hing	Hong Kong	1:41:59
39	Adrien Niyonshuti	Rwanda	1:42:46
40	Marios Athanasiadis	Cyprus	1:43:25
–	Tong Weisong	China	LAP
–	Derek Horton	Guam	LAP
–	Sven Nys	Belgium	DNF
–	Max Plaxton	Canada	DNF
–	András Parti	Hungary	DNF
–	Julien Absalon	France	DNF
–	Liam Killeen	Great Britain	DNF
–	Robert Förstemann	Germany	DNS
–	Michael Vingerling	Netherlands	DNS
–	Sam Bewley	New Zealand	DNS
