= Serhiy Rysenko =

Ukrainian cyclist

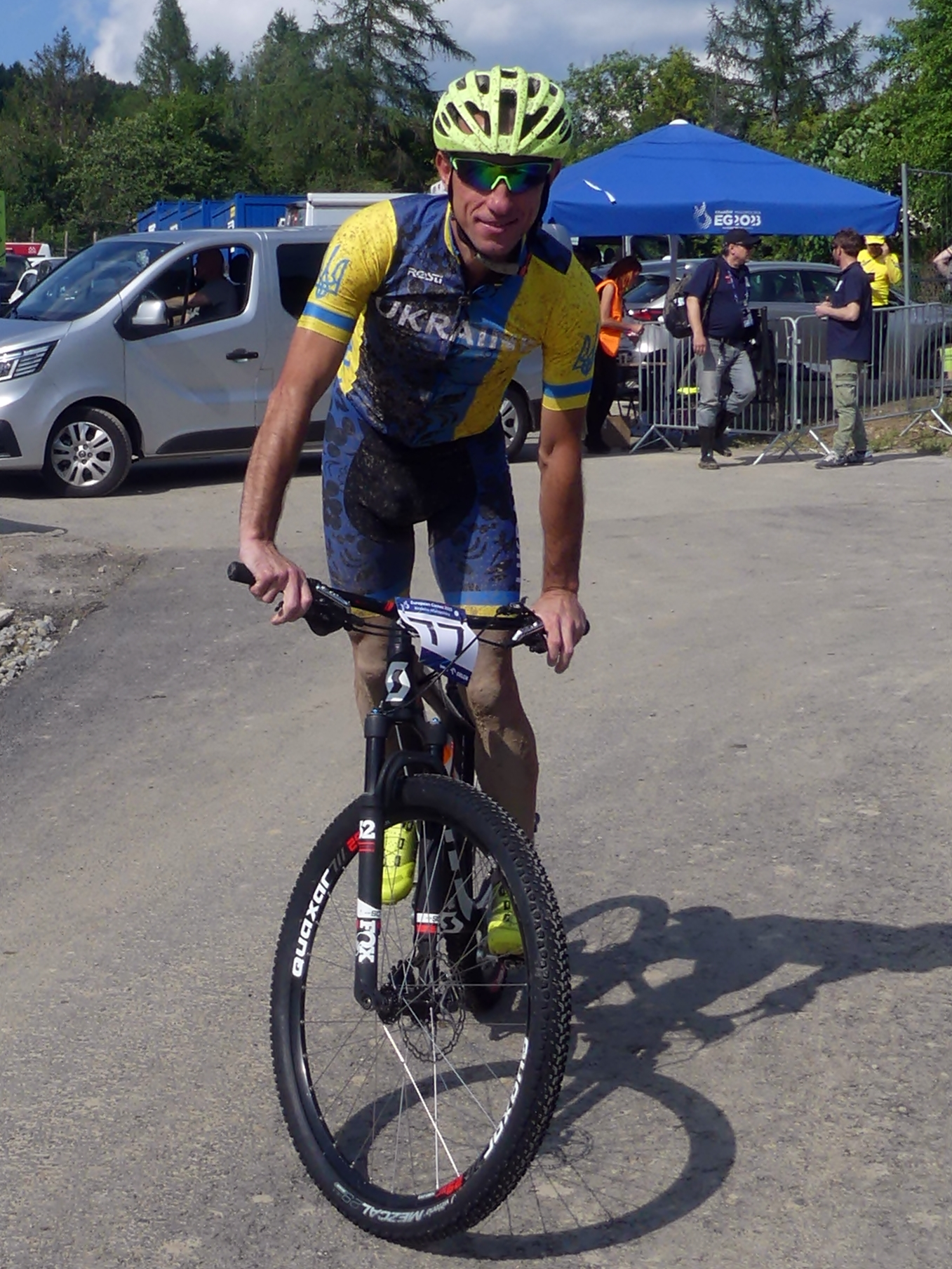
- Rysenko Sergi, European Games 2023

Personal information
- Full name: Serhiy Rysenko
- Born: 15 March 1980 (age 46) Voroshilovgrad, Ukrainian SSR, Soviet Union

Cycling career
- Sport: Cycling
- Discipline: Mountain bike
- Role: Rider
- Rider type: Cross-country

Serhiy Rysenko is a Ukrainian cross-country mountain biker. He competed at the 2000 Olympics where he finished in 27th place, at the 2004 Olympics where he finished in 36th place, at the 2008 Olympics where he finished in 42nd place and at the 2012 Summer Olympics, he competed in the Men's cross-country at Hadleigh Farm, finishing in 31st place.
