= Lukas Flückiger =

Swiss mountain biker

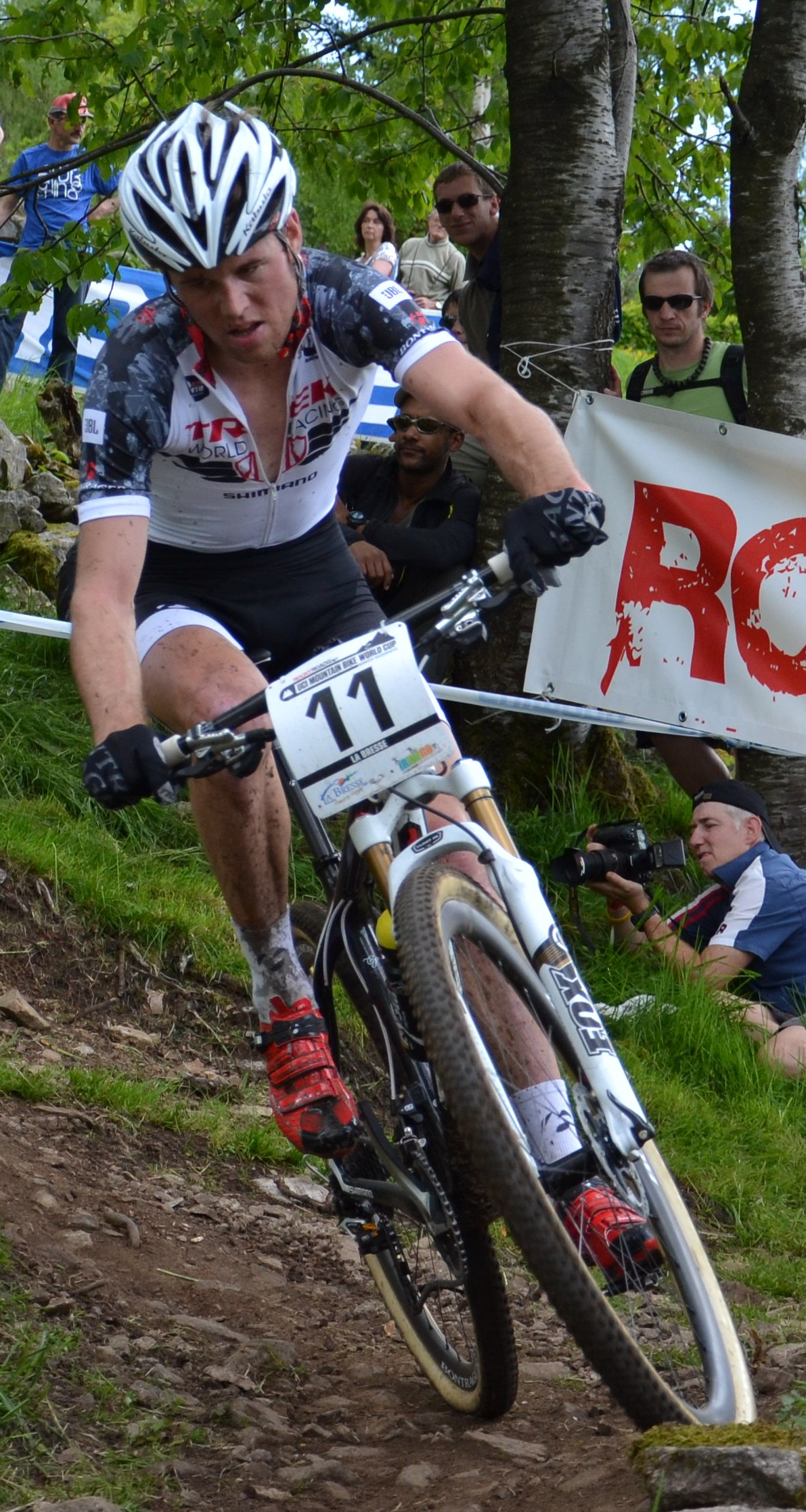

Personal information
- Born: 31 January 1984 (age 42) Sumiswald, Switzerland
- Height: 1.83 m (6 ft 0 in)
- Weight: 68 kg (150 lb)

Cycling career
- Sport: Cycling
- Current team: BMC Mountain Bike Racing
- Disciplines: Mountain bike; Cyclo-cross
- Role: Rider

Professional teams
- 2009–2012: Trek World Racing
- 2013–: BMC Mountainbike Racing Team
Medal record
Representing Switzerland
Men's mountain bike racing
World Championships
Silver medal – second place	2012 Saalfelden	Cross-country
European Games
Silver medal – second place	2015 Baku	Cross-country
European Championships
Silver medal – second place	2010 Haifa	Cross-country
Silver medal – second place	2015 Chies d'Alpago	Cross-country

Lukas Flückiger (born 31 January 1984) is a Swiss professional mountain bike and cyclo-cross cyclist. He is the brother of Mathias Flückiger. He was on the start list for the 2018 Cross-country European Championship and he finished 4th.

== Major results ==
=== Cyclo-cross ===
2005-2006
1st Cyclo-Cross Rennaz-Noville
2008-2009
1st International Radquer Frenkendorf
1st Grand Prix International Cyclocross Sion-Valais
2009-2010
1st National Championships
1st International Radquer Frenkendorf
1st GP 5 Sterne Region
2010-2011
1st GP 5 Sterne Region
2011-2012
1st International Radquer Uster
2012-2013
1st USGP of Cyclocross # 2 - Planet Bike Cup 2, Sun Prairie
2013-2014
1st National Championships
1st Flückiger Cross Madiswil
2015-2016
1st Cyclocross International Sion-Valais
2016-2017
1st Cyclocross International Nyon

=== Mountain bike ===
2007
2nd National Championships
2008
2nd National Championships
2009
3rd National Championships
2010
3rd National Championships
2010
2nd Cross-country, UCI World Championships
2nd Cross-country, UEC European Championships
2015
2nd Cross-country, European Games
2nd Cross-country, UEC European Championships
2016
1st Overall Swiss Epic (with Reto Indergand)
