= José Borges =

Cuban baseball player

- Pitcher / Second baseman
- Born: 1882; Cuba
- Batted: Unknown Threw: Unknown

debut
- 1902, for the Almendares

Last appearance
- 1909, for the Fé

José Borges (1882 – after 1909) was a Cuban professional baseball pitcher and second baseman in the Cuban League and Negro leagues. He played from 1902 to 1909 with several clubs, including Almendares, Nuevo Criollo and Club Fé, as well as competing in the Negro leagues for the Cuban Stars.

== Sources ==
- Figueredo, Jorge S. (2003). Cuban Baseball. A Statistical History, 1878–1961. Jefferson, North Carolina, US: McFarland & Company. ISBN 0-7864-1250-X.
