= Miho Imai =

Japanese cyclist (born 1987)

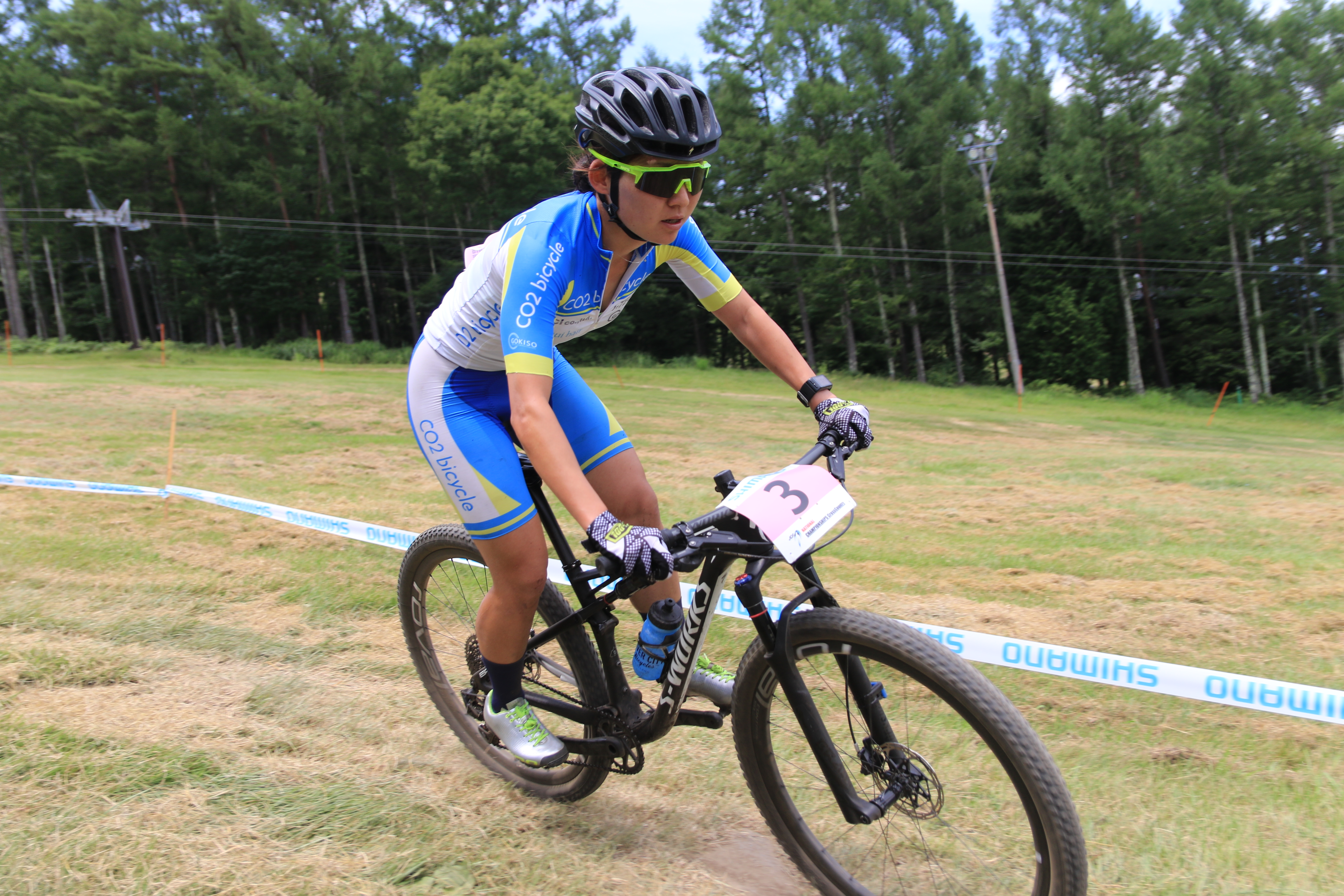

Personal information
- Born: May 29, 1987 (age 39)

Cycling career
- Sport: Cycling
- Role: Rider

Miho Imai (born 29 May 1987) is a Japanese cyclist and a multiple time Japanese national champion.

== Personal life ==
She works as a teacher at Shinden Elementary School in Maebashi, Japan.

== Career ==
She has represented Japan in cyclo-cross at international level, competing at the 2017 World Championships in Luxembourg. Imai won the Japanese national championships in 2018, 2019 and 2020. She focused on mountain bike racing after it was included on the programme for the Olympic Games. She was selected for the Japanese team for the cross-country race.

In Tokyo 2020, she competed in the women's cross-country mountain biking event and finished 37th.
