= Karl Markt =

Austrian cross-country mountain biker

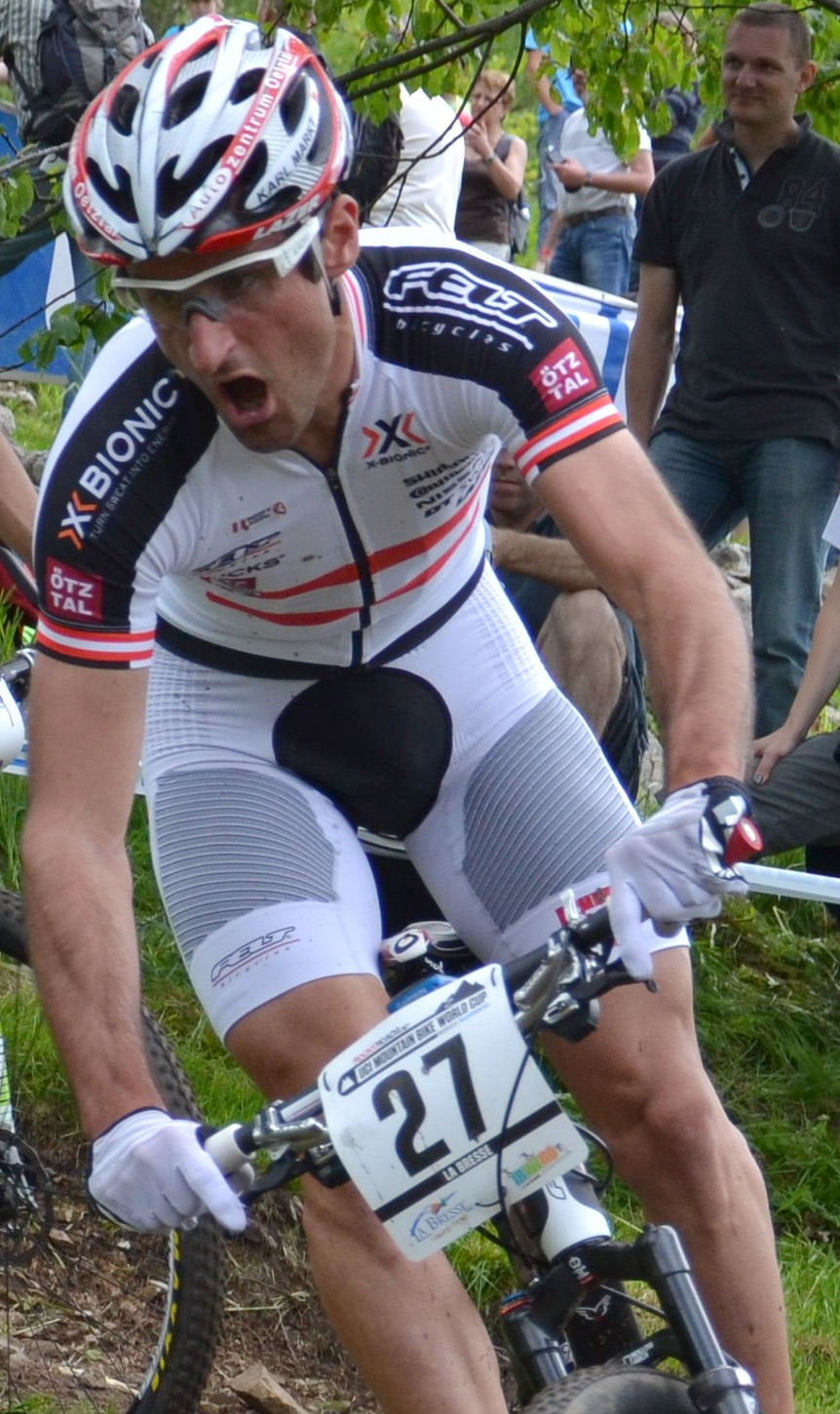
- Karl Markt in 2012

Personal information
- Born: 8 March 1980 (age 46) Zams, Austria

Cycling career
- Sport: Cycling
- Discipline: Mountain
- Role: Rider
- Rider type: Cross-country

Karl Markt (born 8 March 1980) is an Austrian cross-country mountain biker. At the 2012 Summer Olympics, he competed in the Men's cross-country at Hadleigh Farm, finishing in 20th place.
