= Viktoria Kirsanova =

Russian cross-country mountain biker

Personal information
- Born: 29 October 1998 (age 27)

Cycling career
- Sport: Cycling
- Discipline: Mountain bike racing
- Role: Rider
- Rider type: Cross-country
Medal record
Women's mountain bike racing
Representing Russia
European Championships
| Bronze medal – third place | 2020 Monte Tamaro | Under-23 Cross-country |

Viktoria Kirsanova (born 29 October 1998) is a Russian cross-country mountain biker. She competed in the women's cross-country event at the 2020 Summer Olympics.

== Major results ==
2019
1st National XCO Championships
2020
1st National XCO Championships
3rd European Under-23 XCO Championships
2021
1st National XCO Championships
