= Urara Kawaguchi =

Japanese mountain biker

Personal information
- Born: 5 December 2000 (age 25) Tatsuno, Japan

Cycling career
- Sport: Cycling
- Disciplines: Mountain biking Road

Urara Kawaguchi (born 5 December 2000) is a Japanese mountain biker. She competed in the women's cross-country event at the 2024 Summer Olympics.

== Major results ==
2023
National Championships

1st Cross-country short track
2nd Cross-country

2024
National Championships

1st Cross-country short track
2nd Cross-country
