= Franco Delgado =

Uruguayan footballer

Personal information
- Full name: Franco Delgado Curbelo
- Date of birth: 3 June 2005 (age 21)
- Place of birth: Ciudad de la Costa, Uruguay
- Height: 1.86 m (6 ft 1 in)
- Position: Forward

Team information
- Current team: Rampla Juniors

Youth career
- 2023: Danubio
- 2024–2025: Corinthians

Senior career*
Years	Team	Apps	(Gls)
2025	Cerro Largo	3	(0)
2026–	Rampla Juniors	0	(0)
- * Club domestic league appearances and goals as of 10 August 2026

Franco Delgado Curbelo (born 3 June 2005) is a Uruguayan footballer who plays as a forward for Rampla Juniors.

== Club career ==
Delgado began his development in the youth ranks of Danubio in Uruguay before moving to Brazil, where he played for the under-20 side of Corinthians during the 2024 season.

He returned to Uruguay and made his senior debut with Cerro Largo in the 2025 Liga AUF Uruguaya season.

In February 2026, Delgado signed for Rampla Juniors as the club prepared for its first-ever season in the Uruguayan third-tier Divisional C, following relegation the previous year.

== Career statistics ==
As of 5 August 2026

Appearances and goals by club and season
Club	Season	League			National cup		Continental		Other		Total	
Club	Season	Division	Apps	Goals	Apps	Goals	Apps	Goals	Apps	Goals	Apps	Goals
Cerro Largo	2025	Liga AUF Uruguaya	3	0	0	0	0	0	0	0	3	0
Rampla Juniors	2026	Liga AUF Uruguaya	0	0	0	0	0	0	0	0	0	0
Career total			0	0	0	0	0	0	0	0	3	0
