= David Rosa =

Portuguese cyclist

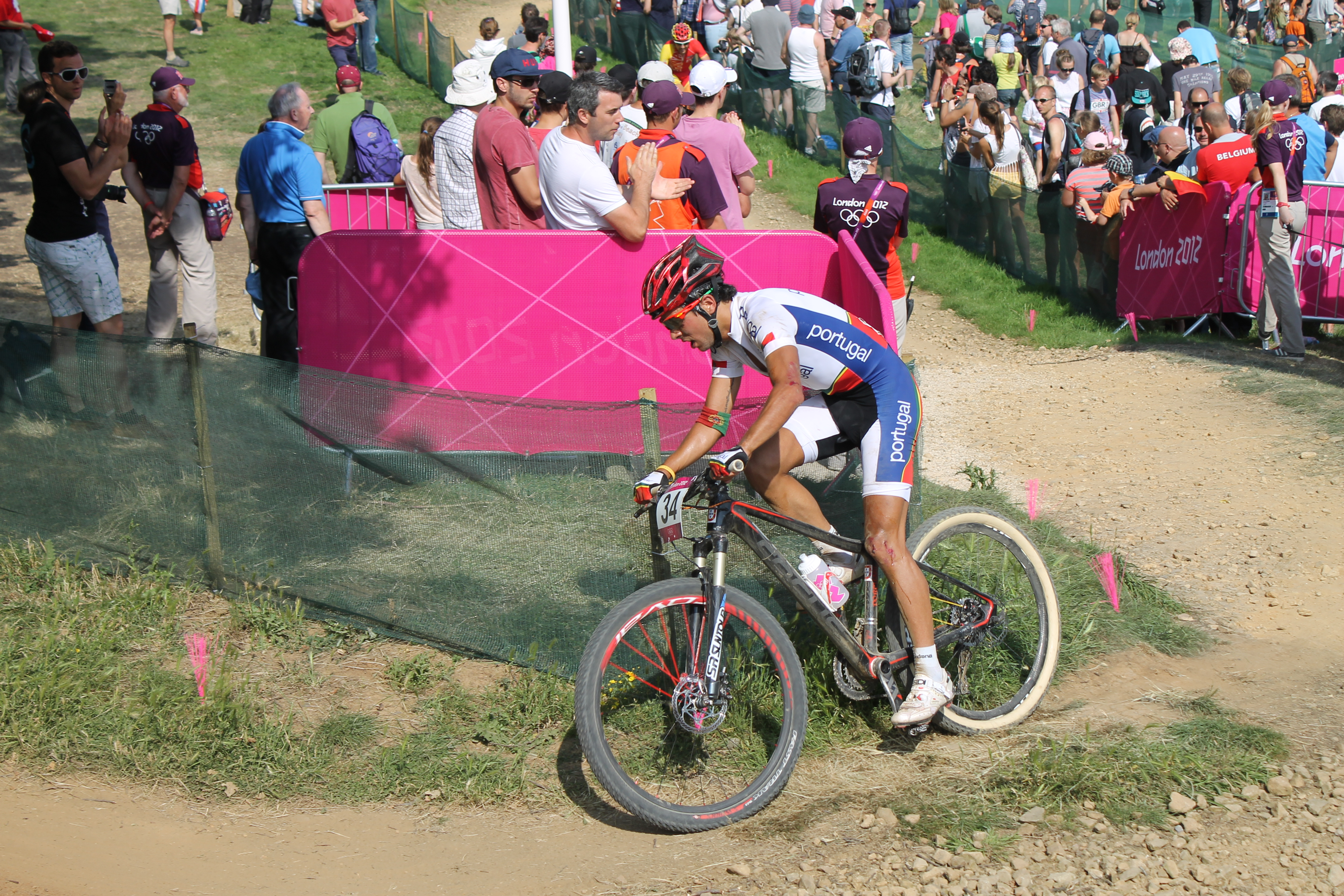
David Rosa at the 2012 Summer Olympics

David João Serralheiro Rosa (born 12 November 1986, in Fátima) is a Portuguese mountain biker. At the 2012 Summer Olympics, he competed in the men's cross-country at Hadleigh Farm, finishing in 23rd place. He was the first Portuguese ever to compete in an Olympic mountain bike competition. David Rosa is seven times MTB Portuguese National Champion.
