= András Parti =

Hungarian cross-country mountain biker

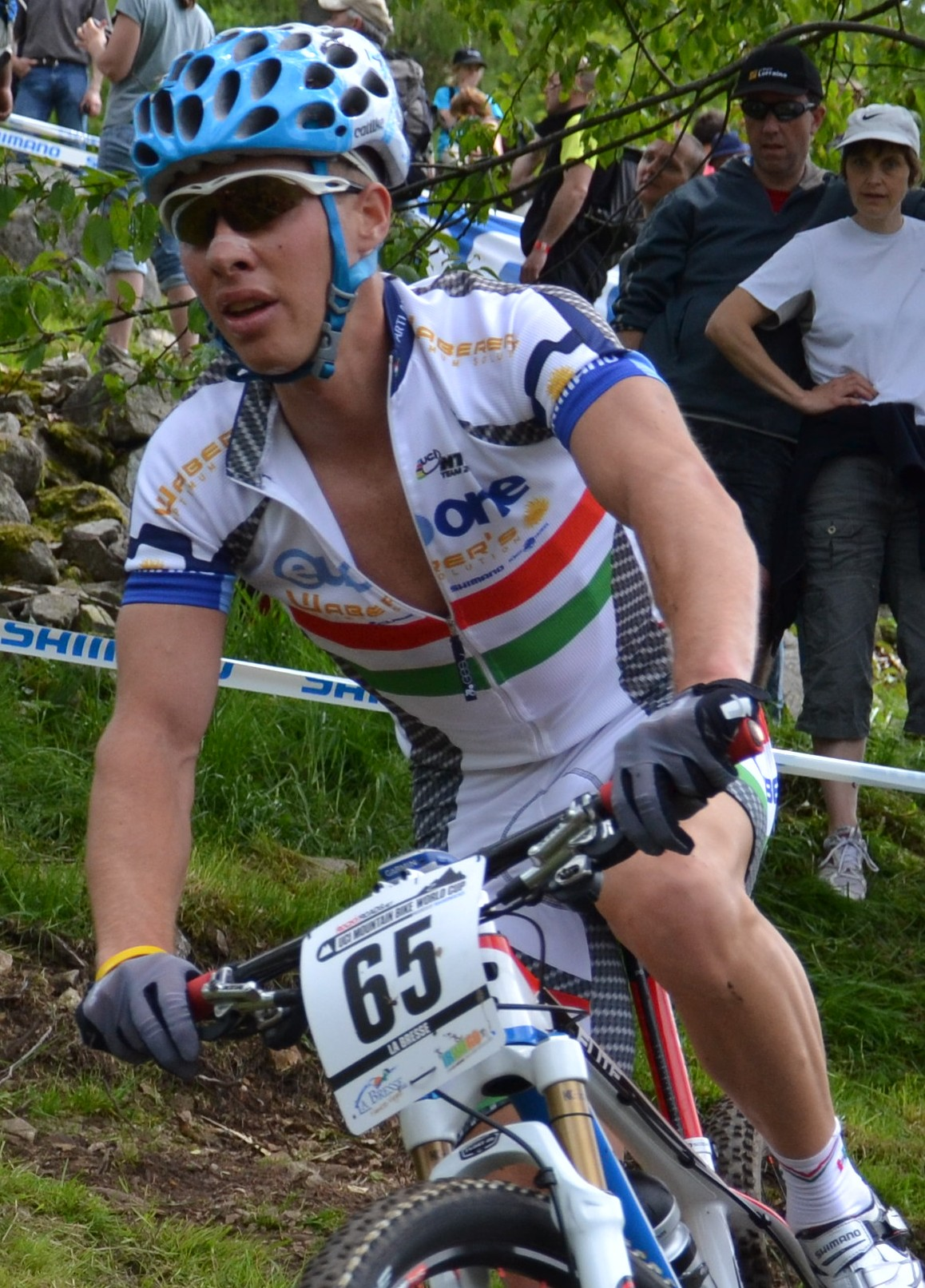
- Parti in 2012

Personal information
- Full name: András Parti
- Born: 18 September 1982 (age 44)

Cycling career
- Sport: Cycling
- Discipline: Mountain bike
- Role: Rider
- Rider type: Cross-country and marathon

András Parti is a Hungarian cross-country mountain biker. At the 2012 Summer Olympics, he competed in the Men's cross-country at Hadleigh Farm, but did not finish. He had finished in 23rd in the same event at the 2008 Summer Olympics. He was on the start list for the 2018 Cross-country European Championship and he finished
