= Jitka Čábelická =

Czech cyclist (born 1990)

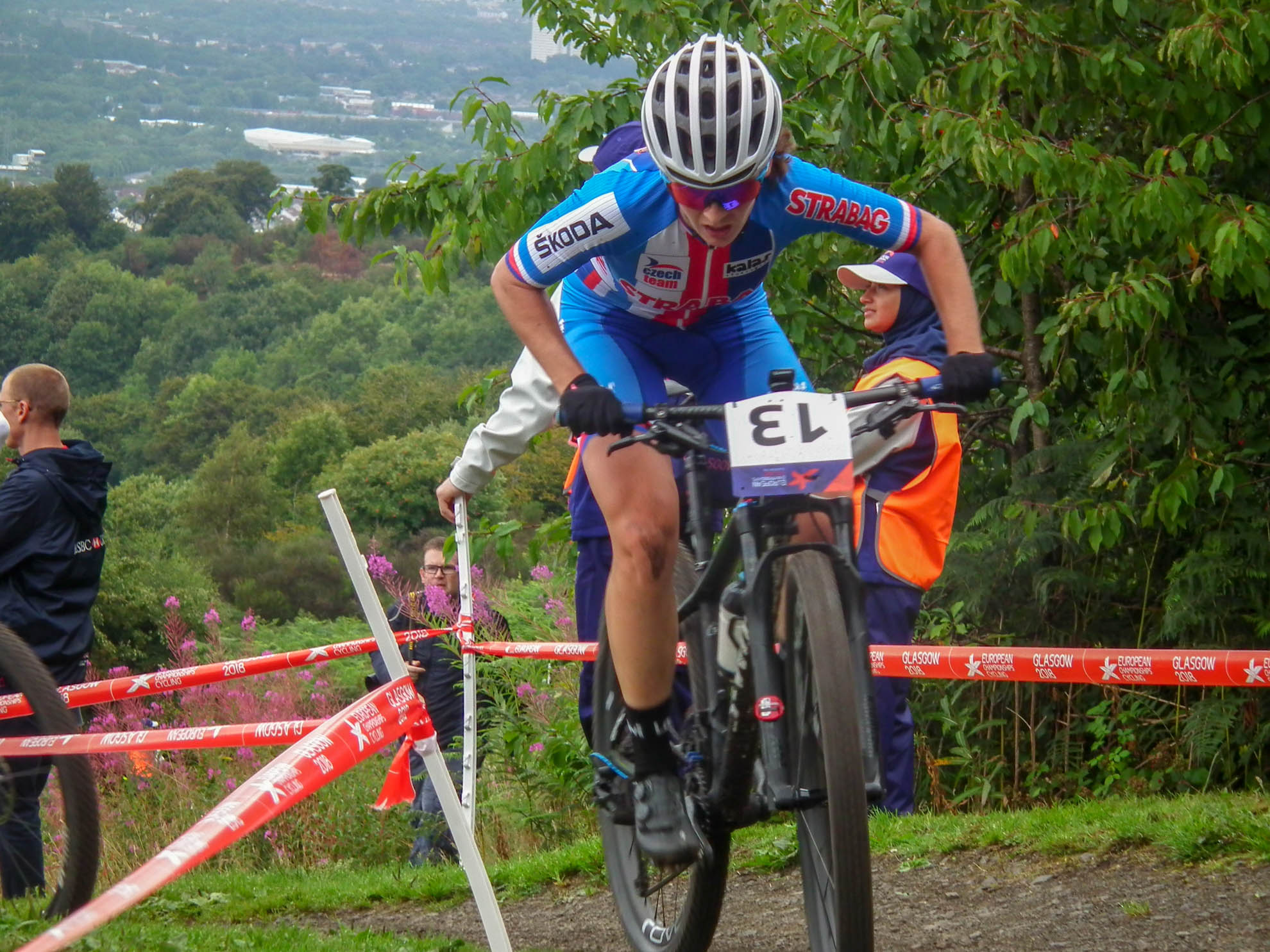
- Jitka Cabelicka for Czech Republic at the 2018 European Mountain Bike Championship

Personal information
- Birth name: Jitka Škarnitzlová
- Nationality: Czech
- Born: 15 February 1990 (age 35); Brandýs nad Labem, Czech Republic

Sport
- Sport: Cycling
- Event: Mountain biking

Jitka Čábelická (née Škarnitzlová) (born 15 February 1990) is a Czech cyclist.

In 2007, she won a silver medal at the Junior World Championships in Fort William, Scotland. She won the Czech championships for a fourth time in a row in 2022 having also won the title in 2018, 2019 and 2020 (no competition in 2021 due to the coronavirus pandemic). She was selected for the Czech team for the Cycling at the 2020 Summer Olympics – Women's cross-country race and finished 22nd.
