= Sergio Mantecón Gutiérrez =

Spanish cyclist

Sergio Mantecón
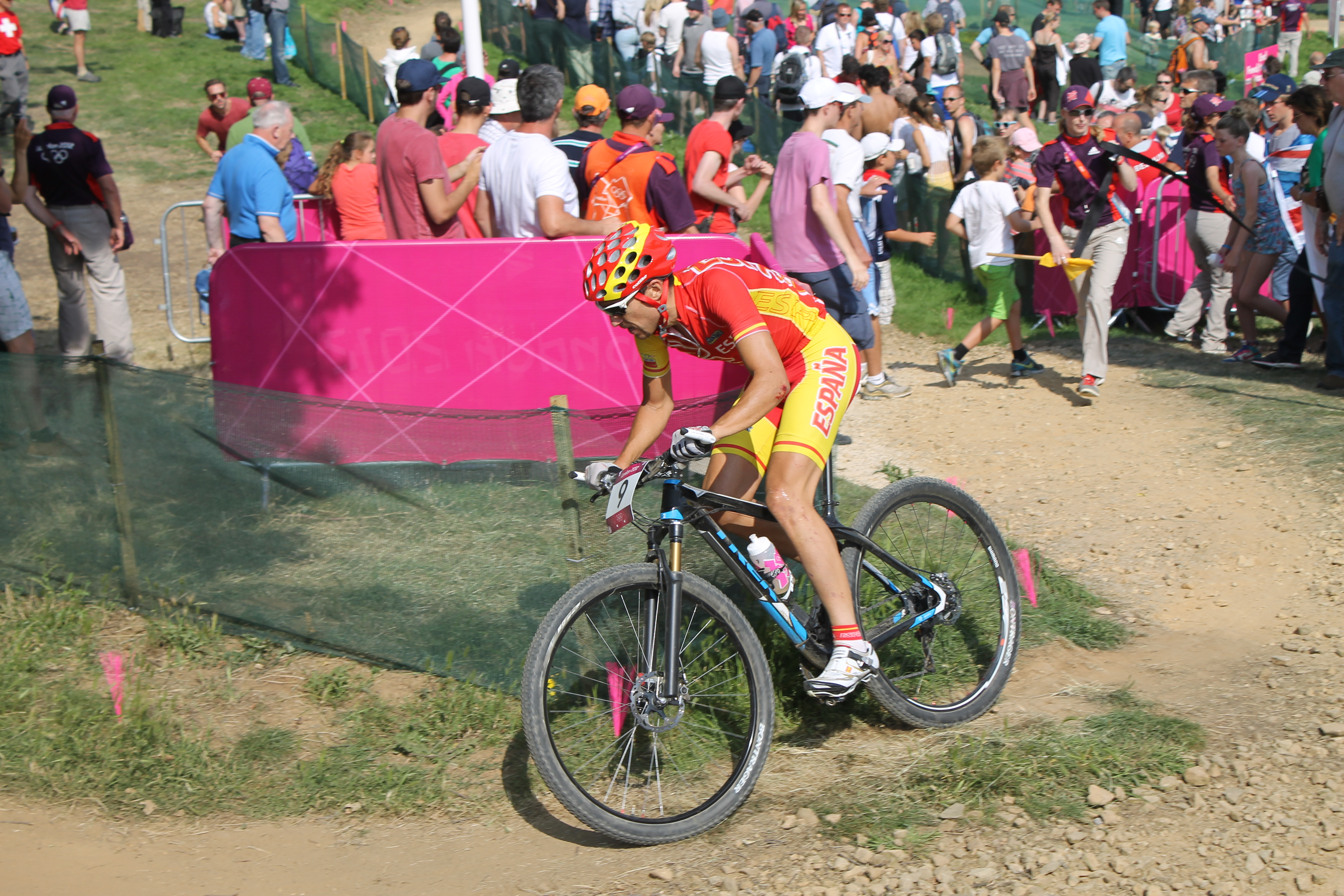
- Mantecón at the 2012 Summer Olympics

Personal information
- Full name: Sergio Mantecón Gutiérrez
- Born: 25 September 1984 (age 42) Santander, Spain
- Height: 1.79 m (5 ft 10 in)
- Weight: 71 kg (157 lb)

Cycling career
- Sport: Cycling
- Disciplines: Cross-country; Road; Cyclo-cross
- Role: Rider

Sergio Mantecón Gutiérrez (born 25 September 1984) is a Spanish cross-country mountain biker. At the 2012 Summer Olympics, he competed in the Men's cross-country at Hadleigh Farm, finishing in 22nd place.

== Major results ==
=== MTB ===
2008
1st National XCM Championships
2010
1st National XCO Championships
2011
1st National XCM Championships
2012
1st National XCO Championships
1st National XCM Championships
2nd European XCO Championships

=== Road ===
2010
1st Overall Cinturón a Mallorca
1st Road race, National Amateur Road Championships

=== Cyclo-cross ===
2011–2012
3rd National Championships
