= Shlomi Haimy =

Israeli cyclist (born 1989)

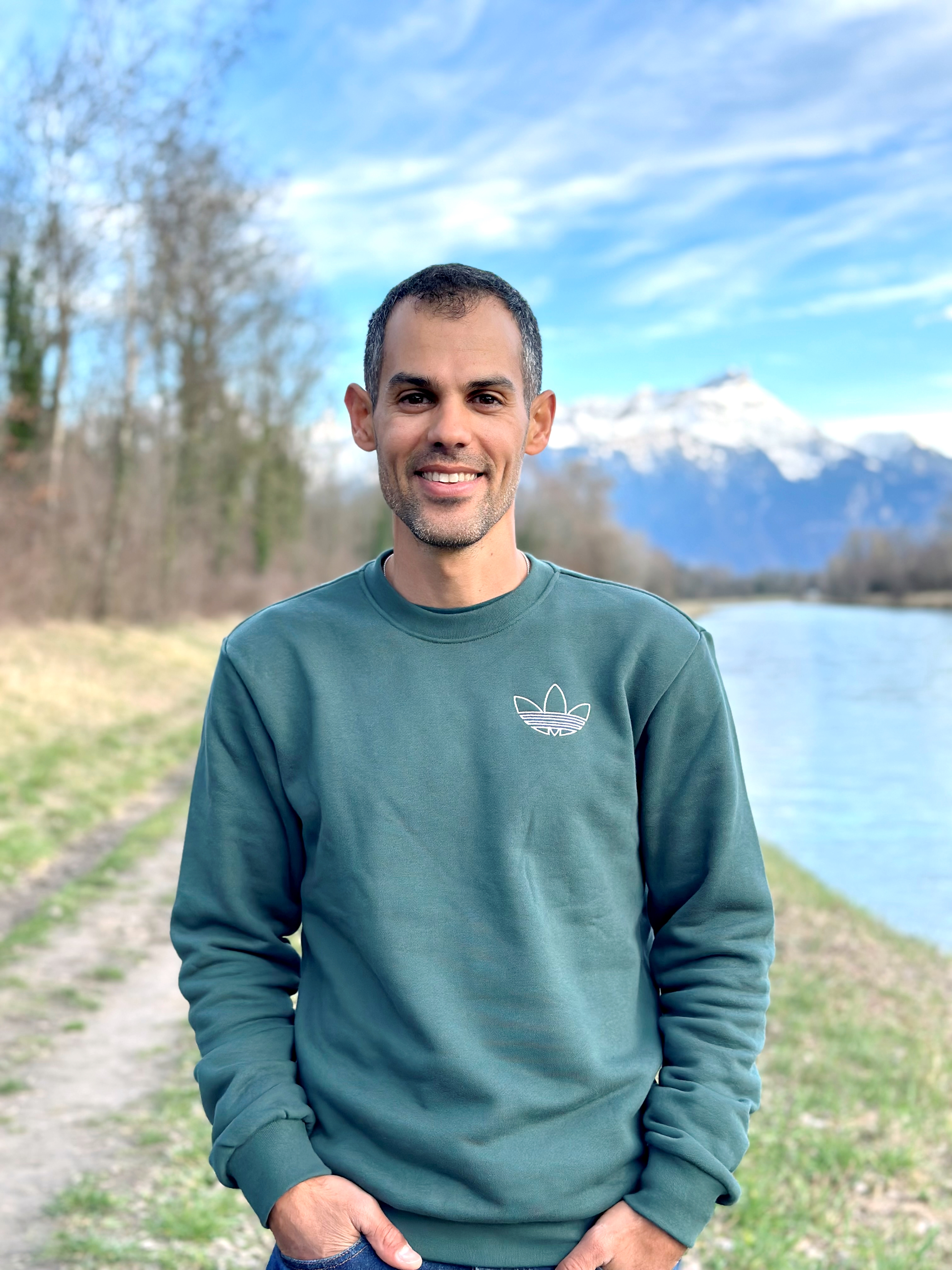
- Haimy in 2023

Personal information
- Full name: שלומי חיימי
- Born: 19 June 1989 (age 37) Kokhav Yair, Israel
- Height: 167 cm (5 ft 6 in)
- Weight: 58 kg (128 lb)

Cycling career
- Sport: Cycling
- Disciplines: Cross-country; Road
- Role: Rider

Professional teams
- 2010: Infotre–LeeCougan
- 2011–2014: Focus MIG Team
- 2015–2016: Novus OMX Pro Team
- 2018–2019: Bike Way Racing Team
- 2020: Israel Cycling Academy

Shlomi Haimy (Hebrew: שלומי חיימי; born 19 June 1989) is an Israeli road and cross-country cyclist, who most recently rode for UCI Continental team Israel Cycling Academy.

== Career ==
In 2007, Haimy came in 7th in the World Men Juniors Cross Country Championships in Fort William, Highland, Scotland. In 2012, he won the Israeli MTB National Championships in a time of 1:23:56. In 2013, he won the Israeli MTB National Championships in a time of 1:20:06. In 2014, he won the Israeli MTB National Championships in a time of 1:27:39.

In July 2015, he won the Israeli MTB National Championships in a time of 1:29:52. In October 2015, he won the Israel National Mountain Bike Championships – XCM, with a time of 3:15:30. In 2016, he won the Israeli MTB National Championships in a time of 1:27:12.

Haimy represented Israel at the 2015 European Games in Baku, Azerbaijan, and placed 18th at the men's cross country competition with a time of 1:49:18, eight minutes behind the winner Nino Schurter, of Switzerland.

Haimy competed for Israel at the 2016 Summer Olympics in Men's Mountain Biking in Rio de Janeiro, Brazil, at the age of 27. It was the first time that Israel competed in an Olympic mountain biking competition, a position it qualified for by virtue of the 22nd-place ranking of the Israeli team in the Union Cycliste Internationale Olympic qualification rankings. He fell victim to a punctured tire, and eventually completed the race in 29th place out of 49 riders, in a time of 1:43:30, 10:02 behind the winner, Nino Schurter of Switzerland.
