= Dimitrios Antoniadis =

Greek cyclist (born 1992)

Personal information
- Born: 29 July 1992 (age 34) Thessaloniki, Greece
- Height: 180 cm (5 ft 11 in)
- Weight: 69 kg (152 lb)

Cycling career
- Sport: Cycling
- Disciplines: Mountain bike; Road; Cyclo-cross
- Role: Rider

Amateur teams
- 2017: SP Tableware
- 2018: PS Kronos

Professional team
- 2014: SP Tableware

Dimitrios Antoniadis (born 29 July 1992) is a Greek cyclist. He rode at the cross-country event at the 2016 Summer Olympics. He finished in 31st place with a time of 1:44:17.

== Major results ==
2012
1st Cross-country, Balkan Championships
2nd Cross-country, National Championships
2013
1st Cross-country, Balkan Championships
2014
1st Cross-country, Balkan Championships
2nd Cross-country, National Championships
2015
1st Cross-country, National Championships
2016
1st Cross-country, Balkan Championships
1st Cross-country, National Championships
2017
1st Cross-country, National Championships
2018
1st Cross-country, National Championships

=== Cyclo-cross ===
2018-2019
1st National Championships
