= Rocío del Alba García =

Spanish cyclist

Personal information
- Full name: Rocío del Alba García Martínez
- Born: 29 August 1997 (age 29) Villa del Prado, Spain

Cycling career
- Sport: Cycling
- Disciplines: Road; Mountain bike
- Role: Rider

Professional team
- 2016: Lointek

Rocío del Alba García Martínez (born 29 August 1997) is a Spanish professional road cyclist and mountain biker.

== See also ==
- List of 2016 UCI Women's Teams and riders
