= Malene Degn =

Danish cyclist (born 1996)

Personal information
- Full name: Malene Fredlund Degn
- Born: 2 December 1996 (age 29) Virum, Denmark

Cycling career
- Sport: Cycling
- Current team: Lapierre Mavic Unity
- Disciplines: Cyclo-cross; Mountain biking
- Role: Rider

Malene Degn (born 2 December 1996) is a Danish cyclist.

She won the Danish national championships in cyclo cross in 2017 and 2018. She was named MTB Rider of the Year at the 2017 Danish Bike Awards. She was selected for the Danish team for the women's cross-country race at the 2020 Summer Olympics.
