= Janka Keseg Števková =

Slovak cyclist

Personal information
- Full name: Janka Keseg Števková
- Born: 4 February 1976 (age 50) Martin, Czechoslovakia (now Slovakia)

Cycling career
- Sport: Cycling
- Current team: Outsiterz cycling team
- Disciplines: Cyclo-cross, road and mountain bike
- Role: Rider
- Rider type: MTB: cross-country

Ing. Janka Keseg Števková (born 4 February 1976 in Martin) is a Slovak cross-country mountain biker. At the 2012 Summer Olympics, she competed in the Women's cross-country at Hadleigh Farm, finishing in 21st place.
