= Janika Lõiv =

Estonian cross-country mountain biker

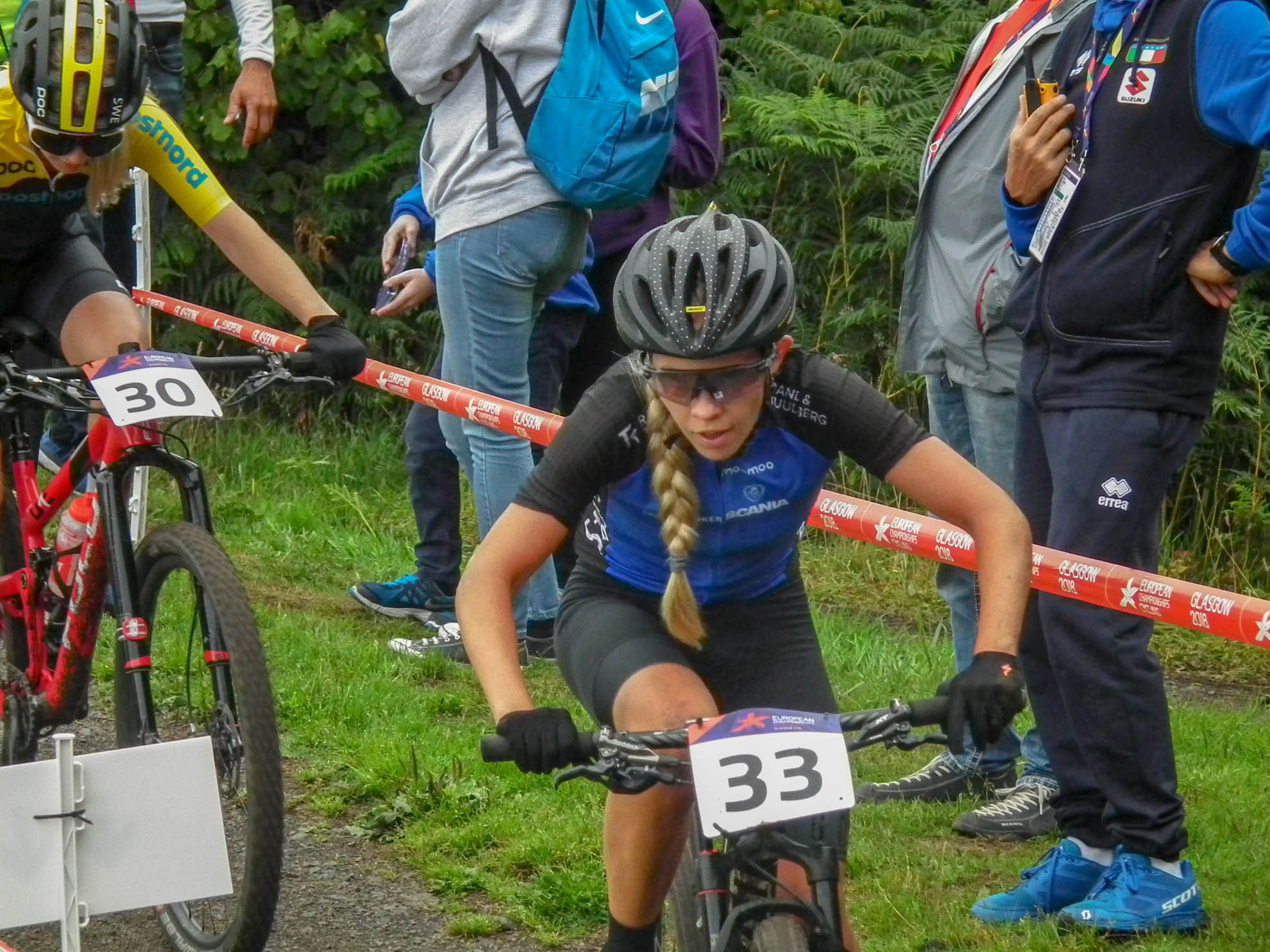
- Lõiv in 2018

Personal information
- Born: 28 November 1989 (age 36) Võru, then part of Estonian SSR, Soviet Union

Cycling career
- Sport: Cycling
- Discipline: Mountain bike racing
- Role: Rider
- Rider type: Cross-country

Janika Lõiv (born 28 November 1989) is an Estonian cross-country mountain biker. She competed in the women's cross-country event at the 2020 Summer Olympics.
