= Yao Bianwa =

Chinese cross-country mountain biker

Personal information
- Born: 20 February 1996 (age 30) Dingxi, China

Cycling career
- Sport: Cycling
- Discipline: Mountain bike
- Role: Rider
- Rider type: Cross-country

Yao Bianwa (born 20 February 1996) is a Chinese cross-country mountain biker. She competed in the 2020 Summer Olympics.
