= Raquel Queirós =

Portuguese cyclist (born 2000)

Personal information
- Full name: Raquel Silva Queirós
- Born: 16 March 2000 (age 26) Vila do Conde, Portugal
- Height: 1.68 m (5 ft 6 in)
- Weight: 55 kg (121 lb)

Cycling career
- Sport: Cycling
- Disciplines: Mountain bike racing Road
- Role: Rider
- Rider type: Cross-country

Raquel Silva Queirós (born 16 March 2000) is a Portuguese road cyclist and cross-country mountain biker. She competed in the women's cross-country event at the 2020 Summer Olympics.

== Major results ==
2020
1st Time trial, National Road Championships
1st National XCO Championships
1st National XCE Championships
2021
1st National XCO Championships
