= Githa Michiels =

Belgian cyclist (born 1983)

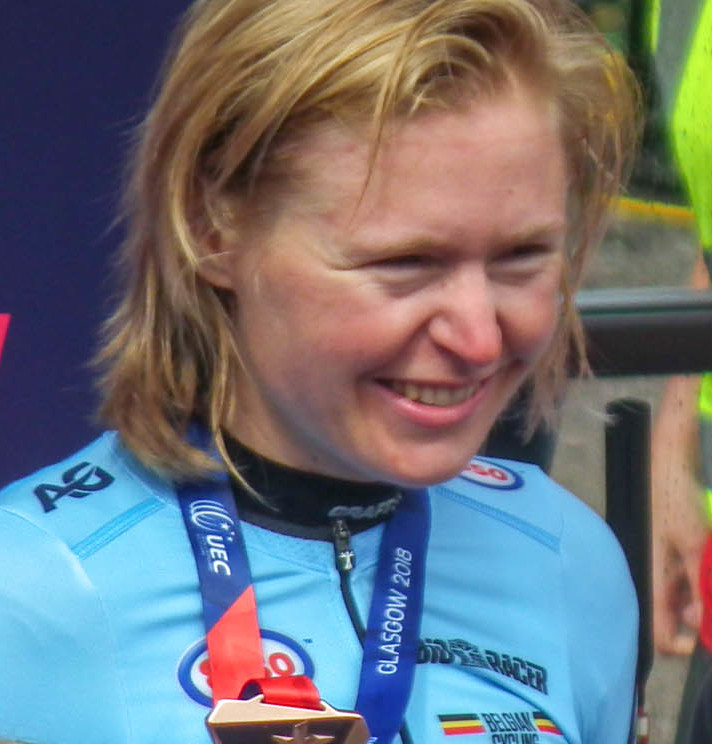
Michiels in 2018

Githa Michiels (born 28 March 1983) is a Belgian cross-country cyclist. She placed 21st in the women's cross-country race at the 2016 Summer Olympics. She was on the start list of 2018 Cross-Country European Championships and finished 3rd.
