= Tanja Žakelj =

Slovenian cyclist (born 1988)

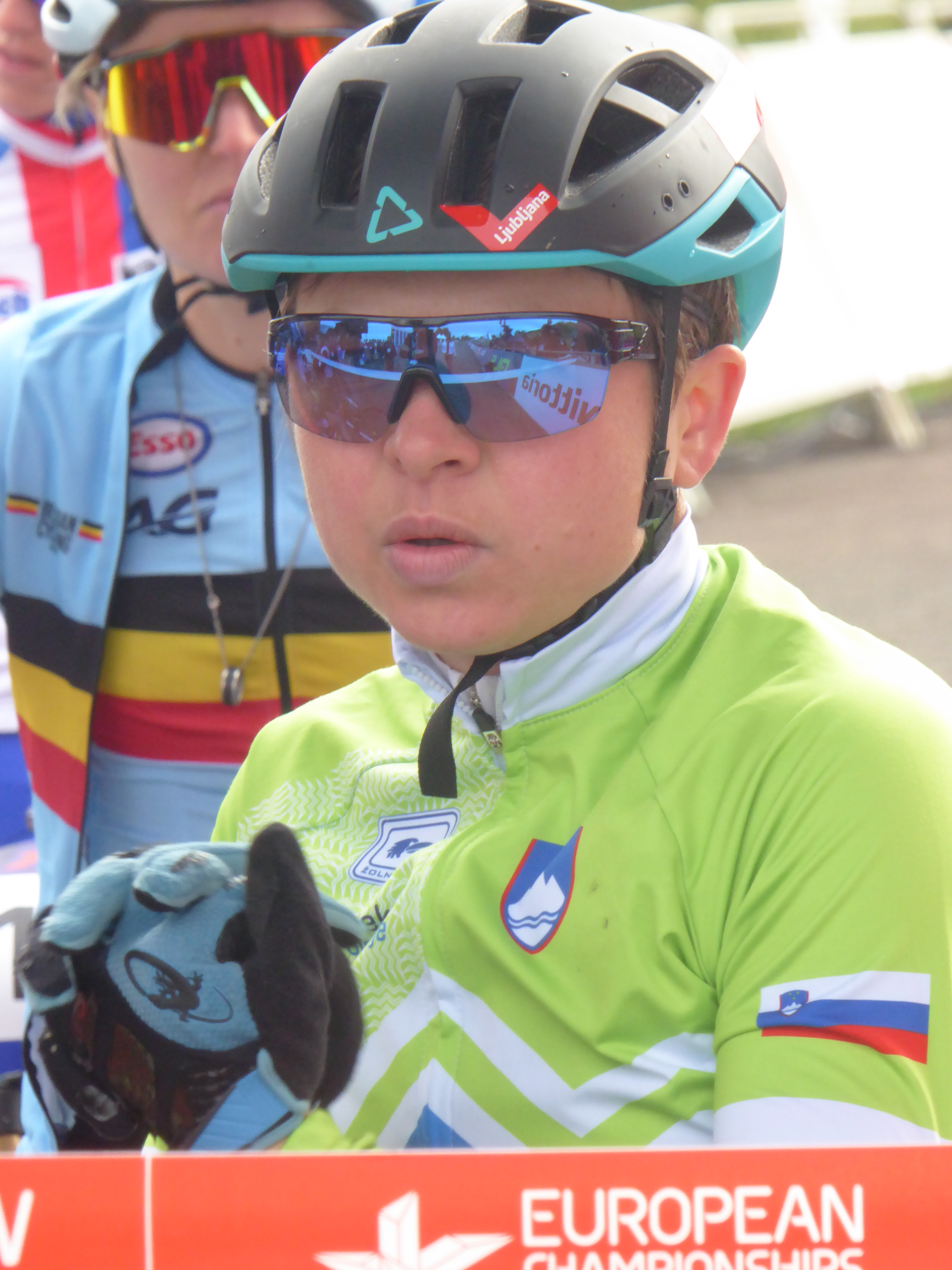
- Žakelj in 2018

Personal information
- Born: 15 September 1988 (age 38) Kranj, Slovenia
- Height: 1.59 m (5 ft 3 in)
- Weight: 56 kg (123 lb)

Cycling career
- Sport: Cycling
- Discipline: Mountain bike racing
- Role: Rider
- Rider type: Cross-country

Major wins
- European Champion - junior (2006); World Champion - junior (2006); World Champion - under 23 (2008); European Champion (2013); Overall World Cup Winner (2013); European Champion (2014)
Medal record
Cross-country
Representing Slovenia
World Championships
Gold medal – first place	2006 Rotorua	Junior
Gold medal – first place	2008 Val di Sole	Under-23
Bronze medal – third place	2005 Livigno	Junior
European Championships
Gold medal – first place	2006 Chies d'Alpago	Junior
Gold medal – first place	2013 Bern	Women
Gold medal – first place	2014 St. Wendel	Women
Silver medal – second place	2008 St. Wendel	Under-23
Bronze medal – third place	2010 Haifa	Under-23
Bronze medal – third place	2011 Dohňany	Women

Tanja Žakelj (born 15 September 1988) is a Slovenian racing cyclist, holder of multiple world and European champion titles. She was born in Kranj. She competed in mountain biking at the 2012 Summer Olympics in London and the 2016 Summer Olympics in Rio de Janeiro. She is the 2013 European Champion and former overall World Cup Winner. She was on the start list of 2018 Cross Country European Championships and finished 12.

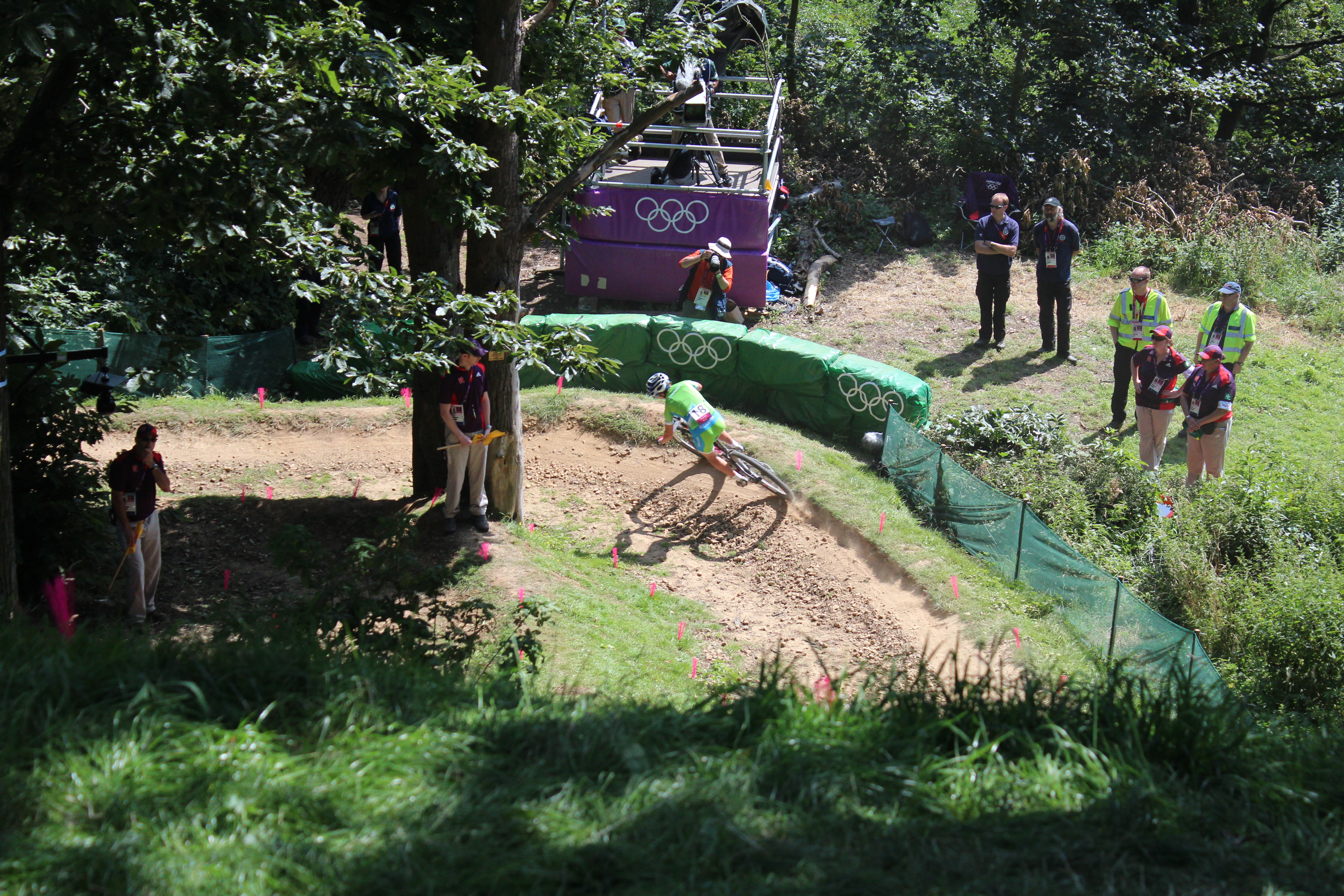
Žakelj at the 2012 Olympic cross-country race

Most notable achievements:

- Olympic games:
  - 10th place, London 2012
  - 13th place, Rio de Janeiro, 2016
- World Championship:
  - 1st place, junior, Rotoura 2006
  - 1st place, under 23, Val di Sole 2008
  - 3rd place, junior, Livigno 2005
  - 4th place, Hafjell 2014
  - 4th place, under 23, Mont St. Anne 2010
  - 5th place, Pietermaritzburg 2013
- European Championship:
  - 1st place, Bern 2013
  - 1st place, St. Wendel 2014
  - 1st place, junior, Chies D'Alpago 2006
  - 2nd place, under 23, St. Wendel 2008
  - 3rd place, under 23, Haifa 2010
  - 3rd place, Dohnany 2011
- World Cup:
  - 1st place, Val di Sole 2013
  - 1st place, Nove Mesto 2013
  - 1st place, under 23, Windham 2010
  - 2nd place, Windham 2014
  - 2nd place, under 23, Houffalize 2010
  - 3rd place, Mont Sainte Anne 2013
  - 4th place, Albstadt 2014
  - 4th place, Albstadt 2013
  - 5th place, Cairns 2014
  - 5th place, Andorra 2013
  - 6th place, Windham 2015
  - 6th place, Mont St. Anne 2014
  - 6th place, Hofjell 2013
  - 7th place, Mont-Sainte-Anne 2016
  - 8ht place, Andorra 2016
  - 9th place, Mont-Sainte-Anne 2015
  - 9th place, Offenburg 2011
  - 9th place, Mont St. Anne 2011
  - 10th place, Windham 2010
  - overall World Cup Winner 2013
