= European Mountain Bike Championships =

Annual mountain bike races in Europe

The European Mountain Bike Championships (EMBCs) are an annual mountain bike racing championship in Europe. They have been held since 1989, and on an annual basis since 1991. There have been 28 editions as of 2017.

== Editions ==
Number	Year	Cross-country	Downhill	Dual slalom	Trials	Cross-country marathon
1	1989	Anzère, Switzerland	Not held until 1991	Not held until 1998	Not held until 2003	Not held until 2004
	1990	Not held	Not held until 1991	Not held until 1998	Not held until 2003	Not held until 2004
2	1991	La Bourboule, France		Not held until 1998	Not held until 2003	Not held until 2004
3	1992	Möllbrücke, Austria		Not held until 1998	Not held until 2003	Not held until 2004
4	1993	Klosters, Switzerland		Not held until 1998	Not held until 2003	Not held until 2004
5	1994	Métabief, France		Not held until 1998	Not held until 2003	Not held until 2004
6	1995	Špindlerův Mlýn, Czech Republic		Not held until 1998	Not held until 2003	Not held until 2004
7	1996	Bassano del Grappa, Italy		Not held until 1998	Not held until 2003	Not held until 2004
8	1997	Silkeborg, Denmark	Métabief, France	Not held until 1998	Not held until 2003	Not held until 2004
9	1998	Aywaille, Belgium	Špindlerův Mlýn, Czech Republic		Not held until 2003	Not held until 2004
10	1999	Porto de Mós, Portugal	La Molina, Spain		Not held until 2003	Not held until 2004
11	2000	Rhenen, Netherlands	Vars, France		Not held until 2003	Not held until 2004
12	2001	Sankt Wendel, Germany	Livigno, Italy		Not held until 2003	Not held until 2004
13	2002	Zürich, Switzerland	Not held		Not held until 2003	Not held until 2004
Number	Year	Cross-country	Downhill	Four-cross	Trials	Cross-country marathon
14	2003	Graz, Austria				Not held
15	2004	Wałbrzych, Poland				
16	2005	Kluisbergen, Belgium	Commezzadura, Italy	Not held	Kluisbergen, Belgium	Not held
17	2006	Lamosano, Italy	Commezzadura, Italy	Stollberg, Germany	Cologne, Germany	Tambre, Italy
18	2007	Cappadocia, Turkey	Elatochori, Greece		Wałbrzych, Poland	Sankt Wendel, Germany
19	2008	Sankt Wendel, Germany	Caspoggio, Italy	Not held	Heubach, Germany	Albstadt, Germany
20	2009	Zoetermeer, Netherlands	Kranjska Gora, Slovenia	Ajdovščina, Slovenia	Zoetermeer, Netherlands	Tartu, Estonia
21	2010	Haifa, Israel	Hafjell, Norway	Willingen, Germany	Melsungen, Germany	Montebelluna, Italy
22	2011	Dohňany, Slovakia	Not held		Biella, Italy	Kleinzell, Austria
23	2012	Moscow, Russia	Not held	Szczawno-Zdrój, Poland	Weilrod, Germany	Jablonné v Podještědí, Czech Republic
Number	Year	Cross-country	Downhill	Four-cross Cross-country eliminator	Trials	Cross-country marathon
24	2013 (Note: The cross-country eliminator races were held in Bern and the four-cross races were held in Pamporovo.)	Bern, Switzerland	Pamporovo, Bulgaria	Pamporovo, Bulgaria (4x); Bern, Switzerland (XCE)	Bern, Switzerland	Singen, Germany
Number	Year	Cross-country	Downhill	Cross-country eliminator	Trials	Cross-country marathon
25	2014	Sankt Wendel, Germany	Not held	Sankt Wendel, Germany	Wałbrzych, Poland	Ballyhoura, Ireland
26	2015	Chies d'Alpago, Italy	Wisła, Poland	Chies d'Alpago, Italy		Singen, Germany
27	2016	Huskvarna, Sweden	Wisła, Poland	Huskvarna, Sweden	Le Puy-en-Velay, France	Sigulda, Latvia
28	2017	Darfo Boario Terme, Italy	Sestola, Italy	Darfo Boario Terme, Italy	Not held	Svit, Slovakia
29	2018 (Note: The junior and under-23 cross-country races were held in Stattegg and the elite cross-country races were held in Glasgow, as part of the 2018 European Championships.)	Stattegg, Austria; Glasgow, Great Britain	Lousã, Portugal	Graz, Austria	Moudon, Switzerland	Spilimbergo, Italy
30	2019	Brno, Czech Republic	Pampilhosa da Serra, Portugal	Brno, Czech Republic	Lucca, Italy	Kvam, Norway
31	2020	Monteceneri, Switzerland	–	–	–	–
32	2021	Novi Sad, Serbia	Maribor, Slovenia	Novi Sad, Serbia	–	Evolène, Switzerland
33	2022 (Note: The junior and under-23 cross-country races were held in Anadia and the elite cross-country races were held in Munich, as part of the 2022 European Championships.)	Anadia, Portugal; Munich, Germany	Maribor, Slovenia	Anadia, Portugal	–	Jablonné v Podještědí, Czech Republic
34	2023	Kraków, Poland	Les Menuires, France	Adapazarı, Turkey	Poprad, Slovakia	Laissac-Sévérac-l'Église, France
35	2024	Cheile Grădiștei, Romania	Champéry, France		Jeumont, France	Viborg, Denmark
36	2025	Melgaço, Portugal	La Molina, Spain	Gibraltar, United Kingdom	Aarhus, Denmark	Casella, Italy
37	2026	Monteceneri, Switzerland	Vitosha, Bulgaria	Sakarya, Turkey	Valberg, France	Ramales de la Victoria, Spain

== Winners ==
=== Cross-country ===
==== Men ====
Elite

Year	Gold	Silver	Bronze
1989	Roger Honegger (SUI)	Philippe Perakis (SUI)	Erich Übelhardt (SUI)
1990	Not held		
1991	Erich Übelhardt (SUI)	Mario Noris (ITA)	Thomas Frischknecht (SUI)
1992	Erich Übelhardt (SUI)	Gerhard Zadrobilek (AUT)	Lorenz Saurer (SUI)
1993	Thomas Frischknecht (SUI)	Daniele Bruschi (ITA)	Petr Hric (SVK)
1994	Albert Iten (SUI)	Gary Foord (GBR)	Benny Heylen (BEL)
1995	Jean-Christophe Savignoni (FRA)	Luca Bramati (ITA)	Christophe Dupouey (FRA)
1996	Christophe Dupouey (FRA)	Hubert Pallhuber (ITA)	Cyrille Bonnand (FRA)
1997	Lennie Kristensen (DEN)	Luca Bramati (ITA)	Beat Wabel (SUI)
1998	Christophe Dupouey (FRA)	Bas van Dooren (NED)	Thomas Frischknecht (SUI)
1999	Miguel Martinez (FRA)	Grégory Vollet (FRA)	Roberto Lezaun (ESP)
2000	Filip Meirhaeghe (BEL)	Bart Brentjens (NED)	Roel Paulissen (BEL)
2001	Bart Brentjens (NED)	José Antonio Hermida (ESP)	Lado Fumic (GER)
2002	José Antonio Hermida (ESP)	Lado Fumic (GER)	Roel Paulissen (BEL)
2003	Ralph Näf (SUI)	Julien Absalon (FRA)	Lado Fumic (GER)
2004	José Antonio Hermida (ESP)	Lado Fumic (GER)	Ralph Näf (SUI)
2005	Jean-Christophe Péraud (FRA)	Julien Absalon (FRA)	Marco Bui (ITA)
2006	Julien Absalon (FRA)	Christoph Sauser (SUI)	Ralph Näf (SUI)
2007	José Antonio Hermida (ESP)	Julien Absalon (FRA)	Fredrik Kessiakoff (SWE)
2008	Florian Vogel (SUI)	Christoph Sauser (SUI)	Jakob Fuglsang (DEN)
2009	Ralph Näf (SUI)	José Antonio Hermida (ESP)	Sven Nys (BEL)
2010	Jaroslav Kulhavý (CZE)	Lukas Flückiger (SUI)	Marco Aurelio Fontana (ITA)
2011	Jaroslav Kulhavý (CZE)	Julien Absalon (FRA)	Florian Vogel (SUI)
2012	Moritz Milatz (GER)	Sergio Mantecón (ESP)	Ralph Näf (SUI)
2013	Julien Absalon (FRA)	Nino Schurter (SUI)	Marco Aurelio Fontana (ITA)
2014	Julien Absalon (FRA)	Fabian Giger (SUI)	Jan Škarnitzl (CZE)
2015	Julien Absalon (FRA)	Lukas Flückiger (SUI)	Manuel Fumic (GER)
2016	Julien Absalon (FRA)	Fabian Giger (SUI)	Ondřej Cink (CZE)
2017	Florian Vogel (SUI)	Julien Absalon (FRA)	Manuel Fumic (GER)
2018	Lars Forster (SUI)	Luca Braidot (ITA)	David Valero (ESP)
2019	Mathieu van der Poel (NED)	Florian Vogel (SUI)	Milan Vader (NED)
2020	Nino Schurter (SUI)	Titouan Carod (FRA)	Mathias Flückiger (SUI)
2021	Lars Forster (SUI)	Sebastian Fini Carstensen (DEN)	Filippo Colombo (SUI)
2022	Tom Pidcock (GBR)	Sebastian Fini Carstensen (DEN)	Filippo Colombo (SUI)
2023	Vlad Dascălu (ROM)	Lars Forster (SUI)	Luca Braidot (ITA)
2024	Simone Avondetto (ITA)	Simon Andreassen (DEN)	Julian Schelb (GER)
2025	Tom Pidcock (GBR)	Charlie Aldridge (GBR)	Simon Andreassen (DEN)
2026	Charlie Aldridge (GBR)	Juri Zanotti (ITA)	Fabio Puntener (SUI)

Under-23

Year	Gold	Silver	Bronze
2000	José Antonio Hermida (ESP)	Haakon Austad (NOR)	Thijs Al (NED)
2001	Julien Absalon (FRA)	Thijs Al (NED)	Peter Riis Andersen (DEN)
2002	Julien Absalon (FRA)	Florian Vogel (SUI)	Iñaki Lejarreta (ESP)
2003	Michael Weiss (AUT)	Carlos Coloma (ESP)	Manuel Fumic (GER)
2004	Manuel Fumic (GER)	Iñaki Lejarreta (ESP)	Florian Vogel (SUI)
2005	Rudi van Houts (NED)	Jakob Fuglsang (DEN)	Yury Trofimov (RUS)
2006	Nino Schurter (SUI)	Rudi van Houts (NED)	Tony Longo (ITA)
2007	Nino Schurter (SUI)	Jaroslav Kulhavý (CZE)	Jakob Fuglsang (DEN)
2008	Nino Schurter (SUI)	Stéphane Tempier (FRA)	Mathias Flückiger (SUI)
2009	Fabian Giger (SUI)	Thomas Litscher (SUI)	Lukas Kaufmann (SUI)
2010	Mathias Flückiger (SUI)	Niels Wubben (NED)	Patrick Gallati (SUI)
2011	Gerhard Kerschbaumer (ITA)	Henk Jaap Moorlag (NED)	Thomas Litscher (SUI)
2012	Ondrej Cink (CZE)	Michiel van der Heijden (NED)	Luca Braidot (ITA)
2013	Jordan Sarrou (FRA)	Jens Schuermans (BEL)	Hugo Drechou (FRA)
2014	Jordan Sarrou (FRA)	Michiel van der Heijden (NED)	Bart de Vocht (BEL)
2015	Pablo Rodríguez Guede (ESP)	Grant Ferguson (GBR)	Jens Schuermans (BEL)
2016	Victor Koretzky (FRA)	Titouan Carod (FRA)	Marcel Guerrini (SUI)
2017	Gioele Bertolini (ITA)	Nadir Colledani (ITA)	Simon Andreassen (DEN)
2018	Joshua Dubau (FRA)	Filippo Colombo (SUI)	Milan Vader (NED)
2019	Vlad Dascălu (ROM)	Filippo Colombo (SUI)	Maximilian Brandl (GER)
2020	Joel Roth (SUI)	Vital Albin (SUI)	Juri Zanotti (ITA)
2021	Joel Roth (SUI)	Juri Zanotti (ITA)	David List (GER)
2022	Simone Avondetto (ITA)	Charlie Aldridge (GBR)	Janis Baumann (SUI)
2023	Adrien Boichis (FRA)	Dario Lillo (SUI)	Charlie Aldridge (GBR)
2024	Finn Treudler (SUI)	Luke Wiedmann (SUI)	Luca Martin (FRA)
2025	Adrien Boichis (FRA)	Albert Philipsen (DEN)	Finn Treudler (SUI)
2026	Alix Andre Gallis (FRA)	Nael Rouffiak (FRA)	Sivert Ekroll (NOR)

Juniors

Year	Gold	Silver	Bronze
2000	Liam Killeen (GBR)	Florian Vogel (SUI)	Pavel Boudny (CZE)
2001	Jukka Vastaranta (FIN)	Lars Petter Nordhaug (NOR)	Jorg Graf (SUI)
2002	Thomas Lövkvist (SWE)	Jaroslav Kulhavý (CZE)	Yury Trofimov (RUS)
2003	Jaroslav Kulhavý (CZE)	Jakob Fuglsang (DEN)	Hans Becking (NED)
2004	Nino Schurter (SUI)	Lukas Hanus (SVK)	Hans Becking (NED)
2005	Patrik Gallati (SUI)	Martin Fanger (SUI)	Anders Hovdenes (NOR)
2006	Matthias Flückiger (SUI)	Alexis Vuillermoz (FRA)	Pascal Meyer (SUI)
2007	Thomas Litscher (SUI)	Fabien Canal (FRA)	Peter Sagan (SVK)
2008	Peter Sagan (SVK)	Mykhaylo Batsutsa (UKR)	Matthias Rupp (SUI)
2009	Gerhard Kerschbaumer (ITA)	Michiel van der Heijden (NED)	Martin Gluth (GER)
2010	Roger Walder (SUI)	Maximilian Vieider (ITA)	Michiel van der Heijden (NED)
2011	Jens Schuermans (BEL)	Grant Ferguson (GBR)	Maxime Urruty (FRA)
2012	Romain Seigle (FRA)	Titouan Carod (FRA)	Andri Frischknecht (SUI)
2013	Lukas Baum (GER)	Gioele Bertolini (ITA)	Niels Rasmussen (DEN)
2014	Simon Andreassen (DEN)	Luca Schwarzbauer (GER)	Milan Vader (NED)
2015	Simon Andreassen (DEN)	Antoine Philipp (FRA)	Maximilian Brandl (GER)
2016	Thomas Bonnet (FRA)	Vital Albin (SUI)	Axel Zingle (FRA)
2017	Jofre Cullell (ESP)	Alexandre Balmer (SUI)	Benjamin Le Ny (FRA)
2018	Alexandre Balmer (SUI)	Simone Avondetto (ITA)	Leon Kaiser (GER)
2019	Lukas Malezsewski (BEL)	Janis Baumann (SUI)	Harry Birchill (GBR)
2020	Oliver Vedersø Sølvhøj (DEN)	Janis Baumann (SUI)	Luke Wiedmann (SUI)
2021	Oleksandr Hudyma (UKR)	Roman Holzer (SUI)	Alexandre Martins (FRA)
2022	Gustav Pedersen (DEN)	Rens Manen (NED)	Paul Schehl (GER)
2023	Albert Philipsen (DEN)	Freek Bouten (NED)	Sivert Ekroll (NOR)
2024	Nikolaj Hougs (DEN)	Kryštof Bažant (CZE)	Nils Johansson (SWE)
2025	Anatol Friedl (AUT)	Federico Rosario Brafa (ITA)	Lewin Iten (SUI)
2026	Mathieu Ghibaudo (FRA)	Michael Hettigger (AUT)	Elias Huckmann (GER)

==== Women ====
Elite

Year	Gold	Silver	Bronze
1992	Silvia Fürst (SUI)	Cornelia Sulzer (AUT)	Chantal Daucourt (SUI)
1993	Chantal Daucourt (SUI)	Caroline Alexander (GBR)	Cornelia Sulzer (AUT)
1994	Paola Pezzo (ITA)	Sophie Hosotte-Eglin (FRA)	Maria Paola Turcutto (ITA)
1995	Caroline Alexander (GBR)	Silvia Rovira (ESP)	Nina Aarrestad (NOR)
1996	Paola Pezzo (ITA)	Nadia De Negri (ITA)	Silvia Fürst (SUI)
1997	Chantal Daucourt (SUI)	Alla Epifanova (RUS)	Annabella Stopparo (ITA)
1998	Laurence Leboucher (FRA)	Gunn-Rita Dahle (NOR)	Margarita Fullana (ESP)
1999	Paola Pezzo (ITA)	Barbara Blatter (SUI)	Margarita Fullana (ESP)
2000	Laurence Leboucher (FRA)	Paola Pezzo (ITA)	Caroline Alexander (GBR)
2001	Laurence Leboucher (FRA)	Sabine Spitz (GER)	Irina Kalentieva (RUS)
2002	Gunn-Rita Dahle (NOR)	Laurence Leboucher (FRA)	Sabine Spitz (GER)
2003	Gunn-Rita Dahle (NOR)	Irina Kalentieva (RUS)	Margarita Fullana (ESP)
2004	Gunn-Rita Dahle (NOR)	Maja Włoszczowska (POL)	Sabine Spitz (GER)
2005	Gunn-Rita Dahle (NOR)	Maja Włoszczowska (POL)	Margarita Fullana (ESP)
2006	Margarita Fullana (ESP)	Gunn-Rita Dahle Flesjå (NOR)	Sabine Spitz (GER)
2007	Sabine Spitz (GER)	Irina Kalentieva (RUS)	Kateřina Nash (CZE)
2008	Sabine Spitz (GER)	Irina Kalentieva (RUS)	Gunn-Rita Dahle Flesjå (NOR)
2009	Maja Włoszczowska (POL)	Irina Kalentieva (RUS)	Sabine Spitz (GER)
2010	Katrin Leumann (SUI)	Maja Włoszczowska (POL)	Eva Lechner (ITA)
2011	Gunn-Rita Dahle Flesjå (NOR)	Maja Włoszczowska (POL)	Tanja Žakelj (SLO)
2012	Gunn-Rita Dahle Flesjå (NOR)	Esther Süss (SUI)	Sabine Spitz (GER)
2013	Tanja Žakelj (SLO)	Eva Lechner (ITA)	Maja Włoszczowska (POL)
2014	Tanja Žakelj (SLO)	Blaža Klemenčič (SLO)	Maja Włoszczowska (POL)
2015	Jolanda Neff (SUI)	Eva Lechner (ITA)	Blaža Klemenčič (SLO)
2016	Jolanda Neff (SUI)	Annika Langvad (DEN)	Sabine Spitz (GER)
2017	Yana Belomoyna (UKR)	Linda Indergand (SUI)	Gunn-Rita Dahle Flesjå (NOR)
2018	Jolanda Neff (SUI)	Pauline Ferrand-Prévot (FRA)	Githa Michiels (BEL)
2019	Jolanda Neff (SUI)	Yana Belomoyna (UKR)	Elisabeth Brandau (GER)
2020	Pauline Ferrand-Prévot (FRA)	Anne Terpstra (NED)	Yana Belomoyna (UKR)
2021	Pauline Ferrand-Prévot (FRA)	Anne Terpstra (NED)	Anne Tauber (NED)
2022	Loana Lecomte (FRA)	Pauline Ferrand-Prévot (FRA)	Anne Terpstra (NED)
2023	Puck Pieterse (NED)	Mona Mitterwallner (AUT)	Sina Frei (SUI)
2024	Puck Pieterse (NED)	Mona Mitterwallner (AUT)	Nina Benz (GER)
2025	Jenny Rissveds (SWE)	Evie Richards (GBR)	Nicole Koller (SUI)
2026	Sina Frei (SUI)	Alessandra Keller (SUI)	Jenny Rissveds (SWE)

In 2012 the event was held in Russia.

Under-23

Year	Gold	Silver	Bronze
2006	Sarah Koba (SUI)	Tereza Huříková (CZE)	Eva Lechner (ITA)
2007	Eva Lechner (ITA)	Elisabeth Osl (AUT)	Tereza Huříková (CZE)
2008	Nathalie Schneitter (SUI)	Tanja Žakelj (SLO)	Tereza Huříková (CZE)
2009	Aleksandra Dawidowicz (POL)	Alexandra Engen (SWE)	Julie Bresset (FRA)
2010	Alexandra Engen (SWE)	Kathrin Stirnemann (SUI)	Tanja Žakelj (SLO)
2011	Julie Bresset (FRA)	Annie Last (GBR)	Elisabeth Sveum (NOR)
2012	Jolanda Neff (SUI)	Paula Gorycka (POL)	Anne Terpstra (NED)
2013	Yana Belomoyna (UKR)	Jenny Rissveds (SWE)	Helen Grobert (GER)
2014	Pauline Ferrand-Prévot (FRA)	Jolanda Neff (SUI)	Helen Grobert (GER)
2015	Perrine Clauzel (FRA)	Margot Moschetti (FRA)	Monika Żur (POL)
2016	Sina Frei (SUI)	Jenny Rissveds (SWE)	Evie Richards (GBR)
2017	Sina Frei (SUI)	Alessandra Keller (SUI)	Anne Tauber (NED)
2018	Sina Frei (SUI)	Marika Tovo (ITA)	Rocio del Alba García (ESP)
2019	Sina Frei (SUI)	Laura Stigger (AUT)	Loana Lecomte (FRA)
2020	Loana Lecomte (FRA)	Marika Tovo (ITA)	Viktoria Kirsanova (RUS)
2021	Mona Mitterwallner (AUT)	Puck Pieterse (NED)	Ronja Eibl (GER)
2022	Puck Pieterse (NED)	Fem van Empel (NED)	Giada Specia (ITA)
2023	Sofie Heby Pedersen (DEN)	Ronja Blöchlinger (SUI)	Noëlle Buri (SUI)
2024	Monique Halter (SUI)	Carla Hahn (GER)	Anina Hutter (SUI)
2025	Valentina Corvi (ITA)	Anina Hutter (SUI)	Sina van Thiel (GER)
2026	Anina Hutter (SUI)	Fiona Schibler (SUI)	Elina Benoit (SUI)

Juniors

Year	Gold	Silver	Bronze
2001	Maja Włoszczowska (POL)	Pavla Havlíková (CZE)	Petra Bublova (CZE)
2002	Bettina Schmid (SUI)	Eva Lechner (ITA)	Petra Bublova (CZE)
2003	Bettina Schmid (SUI)	Tereza Huříková (CZE)	Marianne Vos (NED)
2004	Emilie Siegenthaler (SUI)	Tereza Huříková (CZE)	Nathalie Schneitter (SUI)
2005	Marlena Pyrgies (POL)	Aleksandra Dawidowicz (POL)	Julie Krasniak (FRA)
2006	Tanja Žakelj (SLO)	Julie Krasniak (FRA)	Alexandra Engen (SWE)
2007	Kathrin Stirnemann (SUI)	Barbara Benkó (HUN)	Ines Thoma (GER)
2008	Mona Eiberweiser (GER)	Alla Boyko (UKR)	Kajsa Snihs (SWE)
2009	Pauline Ferrand-Prévot (FRA)	Michelle Hediger (SUI)	Anne Terpstra (NED)
2010	Linda Indergand (SUI)	Helen Grobert (GER)	Johanna Techt (GER)
2011	Jolanda Neff (SUI)	Linda Indergand (SUI)	Johanna Techt (GER)
2012	Jenny Rissveds (SWE)	Margot Moschetti (FRA)	Sofia Wiedenroth (GER)
2013	Melane Degn (DEN)	Sofia Wiedenroth (GER)	Alessandra Keller (AUT)
2014	Alessandra Keller (SUI)	Nicole Koller (SUI)	Sina Frei (SUI)
2015	Sina Frei (SUI)	Nicole Koller (SUI)	Ida Jansson (SWE)
2016	Sophie Wright (GBR)	Hélène Clauzel (FRA)	Caroline Bohé (DEN)
2017	Laura Stigger (AUT)	Loana Lecomte (FRA)	Caroline Bohé (DEN)
2018	Laura Stigger (AUT)	Harriet Harnden (GBR)	Tereza Sásková (CZE)
2019	Jacqueline Schneebeli (SUI)	Mona Mitterwallner (AUT)	Harriet Harnden (GBR)
2020	Mona Mitterwallner (AUT)	Olivia Onesti (FRA)	Puck Pieterse (NED)
2021	Line Burquier (FRA)	Sara Cortinovis (ITA)	Lea Huber (SUI)
2022	Monique Halter (SUI)	Lea Huber (SUI)	Natalia Grzegorzewska (POL)
2023	Valentina Corvi (ITA)	Carla Hahn (GER)	Katrin Embacher (AUT)
2024	Maruša Tereza Šerkezi (SLO)	Lara Liehner (SUI)	Giada Martinoli (ITA)
2025	Anja Grossmann (SUI)	Maruša Tereza Šerkezi (SLO)	Barbora Bukovská (CZE)
2026	Anja Grossmann (SUI)	Lise Revol (FRA)	Barbora Bukovská (CZE)

=== Cross-country eliminator ===
==== Men ====
Elite

Year	Gold	Silver	Bronze
2013	Daniel Federspiel (AUT)	Miha Halzer (SLO)	Sepp Freiburghaus (SUI)
2014	Daniel Federspiel (AUT)	Ralph Näf (SUI)	Fabrice Mels (BEL)
2015	Jeroen van Eck (NED)	Heiko Hog (GER)	Marcel Wildhaber (SUI)
2016	Emil Linde (SWE)	Daniel Federspiel (AUT)	Martin Setterberg (SWE)
2017	Titouan Perrin-Ganier (FRA)	Daniel Federspiel (AUT)	Jeroen van Eck (NED)
2018	Titouan Perrin-Ganier (FRA)	Lorenzo Serres (FRA)	Simon Rogier (FRA)
2019	Hugo Briatta (FRA)	Titouan Perrin-Ganier (FRA)	Lorenzo Serres (FRA)
2020	Titouan Perrin-Ganier (FRA)	Jeroen van Eck (NED)	Hugo Briatta (FRA)
2021	Jeroen van Eck (NED)	Lorenzo Serres (FRA)	Joel Burman (SWE)
2022	Jakob Klemenčič (SLO)	Ricardo Marinheiro (POR)	Ede-Károly Molnár (ROM)
2023	Ede-Károly Molnár (ROM)	Titouan Perrin-Ganier (FRA)	Nils-Obed Riecker (GER)
2024	Theo Hauser (AUT)	Jakob Klemenčič (SLO)	Ede-Károly Molnár (ROM)
2025	Jakob Klemenčič (SLO)	Lorenzo Serres (FRA)	Matic Kranjec Žagar (SLO)
2026	Jakob Klemenčič (SLO)	Theo Hauser (AUT)	Ede-Károly Molnár (ROM)

==== Women ====
Elite

Year	Gold	Silver	Bronze
2013	Jenny Rissveds (SWE)	Kathrin Stirnemann (SUI)	Ramona Forchini (SUI)
2014	Kathrin Stirnemann (SUI)	Linda Indergand (SUI)	Alexandra Engen (SWE)
2015	Kathrin Stirnemann (SUI)	Anna Oberparleiter (ITA)	Chiara Teocchi (ITA)
2016	Iryna Popova (UKR)	Anne Terpstra (NED)	Anna Oberparleiter (ITA)
2017	Kathrin Stirnemann (SUI)	Barbora Průdková (CZE)	Anne Terpstra (NED)
2018	Iryna Popova (UKR)	Coline Clauzure (FRA)	Barbora Průdková (CZE)
2019	Gaia Tormena (ITA)	Coline Clauzure (FRA)	Magdalena Durán (ESP)
2020	Gaia Tormena (ITA)	Linda Indergand (SUI)	Marion Fromberger (GER)
2021	Gaia Tormena (ITA)	Fem van Empel (NED)	Iryna Popova (UKR)
2022	Gaia Tormena (ITA)	Terézia Ciriaková (SVK)	Zuzana Šafářová (CZE)
2023	Gaia Tormena (ITA)	Marion Fromberger (GER)	Annemoon van Dienst (NED)
2024	Gaia Tormena (ITA)	Line Mygdam (DEN)	Constantina Georgiou (CYP)
2025	Gaia Tormena (ITA)	Mariia Sukhopalova (UKR)	Adéla Pernická (CZE)
2026	Adéla Pernická (CZE)	Marion Fromberger (GER)	Margaux Borrelly (FRA)

=== Cross-country Short Circuit (XCC) ===
==== Men ====
Elite

Year	Gold	Silver	Bronze
2022	Charlie Aldridge (GBR)	David Campos (ESP)	Alexandre Balmer (SUI)
2023	David Campos (ESP)	Adrien Boichis (FRA)	Thomas Litscher (SUI)
2024	Simon Andreassen (DEN)	Julian Schelb (GER)	Luca Braidot (ITA)
2025	Luca Schätti (SUI)	Thomas Litscher (SUI)	Adrien Boichis (FRA)
2026	Charlie Aldridge (GBR)	Juri Zanotti (ITA)	Dario Lillo (SUI)

U23

Year	Gold	Silver	Bronze
2026	Paul Schehl (GER)	Nicolas Halter (SUI)	Leo Lounela (SWE)

Juniors

Year	Gold	Silver	Bronze
2022	Yanick Binz (SUI)	Loris Hättenschwiler (SUI)	Leo Lounela (SWE)
2023	Mikkel Lose (DEN)	Nikolaj Hougs (DEN)	Edvin Elofsson (SWE)
2024	Sven Sommer (SUI)	Micha Alder (SUI)	Aksel Laforce (NOR)
2025	Anatol Friedl (AUT)	Guillermo Parrado (ESP)	Federico Rosario Brafa (ITA)
2026	Noa Filippi (FRA)	Marwan Barhoumi (SUI)	Elias Hückmann (GER)

==== Women ====
Elite

Year	Gold	Silver	Bronze
2022	Ronja Blöchlinger (SUI)	Giorgia Marchet (ITA)	Linn Gustafzzon (SWE)
2023	Ronja Blöchlinger (SUI)	Noëlle Buri (SUI)	Kira Böhm (GER)
2024	Pauline Ferrand-Prévot (FRA)	Puck Pieterse (NED)	Nicole Koller (SUI)
2025	Jenny Rissveds (SWE)	Nicole Koller (SUI)	Linda Indergand (SUI)
2026	Sina Frei (SUI)	Alessandra Keller (SUI)	Jenny Rissveds (SWE)

U23

Year	Gold	Silver	Bronze
2026	Lea Huber (SUI)	Elina Benoit (SUI)	Lisa Kristine Jorde (NOR)

Juniors

Year	Gold	Silver	Bronze
2022	Simona Spěšná (CZE)	Lea Huber (SUI)	Monique Halter (SUI)
2023	Carla Hahn (GER)	Kamilla Aasebø (NOR)	Eva Herzog (AUT)
2024	Maruša Tereza Šerkezi (SLO)	Lara Liehner (SUI)	Regina Bruchner (HUN)
2025	Maruša Tereza Šerkezi (SLO)	Barbora Bukovská (CZE)	Elinore Nilsson (SWE)
2026	Barbora Bukovská (CZE)	Shana Huber (SUI)	Nikoletta Kiss (HUN)

=== Downhill ===
==== Men ====
Elite

Year	Gold	Silver	Bronze
1991	Christian Taillefer (FRA)		
1992	Jürgen Sprich (GER)	Albert Iten (SUI)	Paul Herygers (BEL)
1993	Jürgen Sprich (GER)	Bruno Zanchi (ITA)	Vincent Julliot (FRA)
1994	Nicolas Vouilloz (FRA)	Tommy Johansson (SWE)	Corrado Hérin (ITA)
1995	François Gachet (FRA)	Nicolas Vouilloz (FRA)	Alexandre Balaud (FRA)
1996	Tomás Misser (ESP)	Juergen Beneke (GER)	Gianluca Bonanomi (ITA)
1997	Nicolas Vouilloz (FRA)	Corrado Hérin (ITA)	Juergen Beneke (GER)
1998	Nicolas Vouilloz (FRA)	Corrado Hérin (ITA)	Juergen Beneke (GER)
1999	Bruno Zanchi (ITA)		
2000	Steve Peat (GBR)	Nicolas Vouilloz (FRA)	Fabien Barel (FRA)
2001	Filip Polc (SVK)	Corrado Hérin (ITA)	Cédric Gracia (FRA)
2002	Not held		
2003	Julien Camelini (FRA)	Mickael Pascal (FRA)	Michael Deldycke (FRA)
2004	Steve Peat (GBR)	Fabien Barel (FRA)	Julien Camelini (FRA)
2005	Fabien Barel (FRA)	Marc Beaumont (GBR)	Steve Peat (GBR)
2006	Gee Atherton (GBR)	Marc Beaumont (GBR)	Fabien Barel (FRA)
2007	David Vázquez (ESP)	Pasqual Canals (ESP)	Florent Payet (FRA)
2008	Florent Payet (FRA)	Damien Spagnolo (FRA)	Nick Beer (SUI)
2009	Nick Beer (SUI)	Aurélien Giordanengo (FRA)	Rémi Thirion (FRA)
2010	Robin Wallner (SWE)	Nick Beer (SUI)	Markus Pekoll (AUT)
2011	Not held		
2012	Not held		
2013	Markus Pekoll (AUT)	Manuel Gruber (AUT)	Miran Vauh (SLO)
2014	Not held		
2015	Jure Žabjek (SLO)	Sławomir Łukasik (POL)	Lutz Weber (SUI)
2016	Not held		
2017	Florent Payet (FRA)	Sławomir Łukasik (POL)	Loris Revelli (ITA)
2018	Francisco Pardal (POR)	Benoît Coulanges (FRA)	Johannes Von Klebelsberg (ITA)
2019	Baptiste Pierron (FRA)	Benoît Coulanges (FRA)	David Trummer (AUT)
2020	Not held		
2021	Loris Vergier (FRA)	Benoît Coulanges (FRA)	Danny Hart (GBR)
2022	Andreas Kolb (AUT)	David Trummer (AUT)	Benoît Coulanges (FRA)
2023	Antoine Vidal (FRA)	Baptiste Pierron (FRA)	Ethan Craik (GBR)
2024	Andreas Kolb (AUT)	Matt Walker (GBR)	Loïc Martin (FRA)
2025	Simon Chapelet (FRA)	Andreas Kolb (AUT)	Johan Garcin (FRA)
2026	Loris Revelli (ITA)	Stefano Introzzi (ITA)	Dom Platt (GBR)

Juniors

Year	Gold	Silver	Bronze
2010	Sam Flockhart (GBR)	Oliwer Kangas (SWE)	Zakarias Blom Johansenk (NOR)
2011	Not held		
2012	Not held		
2013	Francesco Colombo (ITA)	Gianluca Vernassa (ITA)	Jure Žabjek (SLO)
2014	Not held		
2015	Loris Revelli (ITA)	Thibault Laly (FRA)	Tomáš Navrátil (CZE)
2016	Not held		
2017	Sylvain Cougoureux (FRA)	Giacomo Masiero (ITA)	Andrea Bianciotto (ITA)
2018	Tiago Ladeira (POR)	Mika Hopp (GER)	Stefano Introzzi (ITA)
2019	Not held		
2020	Not held		
2021	Jordan Williams (GBR)	Davide Cappello (ITA)	Maximilian Oberhofer (AUT)
2022	Kimi Viardot (FRA)	Davide Cappello (ITA)	Nathan Pontvianne (FRA)
2023	Nathan Pontvianne (FRA)	Christian Hauser (ITA)	Mylann Falquet (FRA)
2024	Max Alran (FRA)	Christian Hauser (ITA)	Roee Ostfeld (ISR)
2025	Omri Danon (ISR)	Oriol Cuadrat (ESP)	Riko Mäeuibo (EST)
2026	Enol Torre (ESP)	Filippo Gilardino (ITA)	Stanislav Mlčák (CZE)

==== Women ====
Elite

Year	Gold	Silver	Bronze
1991	Giovanna Bonazzi (ITA)		
1992	Susi Buchwieser (GER)	Giovanna Bonazzi (ITA)	Sophie Kempf (FRA)
1993	Giovanna Bonazzi (ITA)	Brigitte Kasper (SUI)	Rita Buergi (SUI)
1994	Anne-Caroline Chausson (FRA)	Giovanna Bonazzi (ITA)	Brigitte Kasper (SUI)
1995	Anne-Caroline Chausson (FRA)	Giovanna Bonazzi (ITA)	Nina Aarrestad (NOR)
1996	Anne-Caroline Chausson (FRA)	Nolvenn Le Caër (FRA)	Mercedes González (ESP)
1997	Anne-Caroline Chausson (FRA)	Nolvenn Le Caër (FRA)	Giovanna Bonazzi (ITA)
1998	Anne-Caroline Chausson (FRA)		
1999	Florentina Moser (ITA)		
2000	Tracy Moseley (GBR)	Sabrina Jonnier (FRA)	Céline Gros (FRA)
2001	Sarah Stieger (SUI)	Fionn Griffiths (GBR)	Tracy Moseley (GBR)
2002	Not held		
2003	Anne-Caroline Chausson (FRA)	Marielle Saner (SUI)	Nolvenn Le Caër (FRA)
2004	Anne-Caroline Chausson (FRA)	Marielle Saner (SUI)	Tracy Moseley (GBR)
2005	Anne-Caroline Chausson (FRA)	Sabrina Jonnier (FRA)	Marielle Saner (SUI)
2006	Rachel Atherton (GBR)	Marielle Saner (SUI)	Helen Gaskell (GBR)
2007	Sabrina Jonnier (FRA)	Céline Gros (FRA)	Emmeline Ragot (FRA)
2008	Sabrina Jonnier (FRA)	Petra Bernhard (AUT)	Floriane Pugin (FRA)
2009	Floriane Pugin (FRA)	Emmeline Ragot (FRA)	Céline Gros (FRA)
2010	Myriam Nicole (FRA)	Floriane Pugin (FRA)	Anita Ager-Wick (NOR)
2011	Not held		
2012	Not held		
2013	Emmeline Ragot (FRA)	Morgane Charre (FRA)	Eva Dimitrova (BUL)
2014	Not held		
2015	Jana Bártová (CZE)	Veronika Widmann (ITA)	Eleonora Farina (ITA)
2016	Not held		
2017	Eleonora Farina (ITA)	Alia Marcellini (ITA)	Marine Cabirou (FRA)
2018	Monika Hrastnik (SLO)	Morgane Charre (FRA)	Camille Balanche (SUI)
2019	Camille Balanche (SUI)	Monika Hrastnik (SLO)	Veronika Widmann (ITA)
2020	Not held		
2021	Monika Hrastnik (SLO)	Eleonora Farina (ITA)	Veronika Widmann (ITA)
2022	Monika Hrastnik (SLO)	Camille Balanche (SUI)	Veronika Widmann (ITA)
2023	Eleonora Farina (ITA)	Monika Hrastnik (SLO)	Lisa Baumann (SUI)
2024	Lisa Baumann (SUI)	Valentina Höll (AUT)	Marine Cabirou (FRA)
2025	Lisa Baumann (SUI)	Gloria Scarsi (ITA)	Vicky Clavel (FRA)
2026	Gloria Scarsi (ITA)	Veronika Widmann (ITA)	Amelia Dudek (POL)

Juniors

Year	Gold	Silver	Bronze
2010	Fanny Lombard (FRA)	Julie Berteaux (FRA)	Kim Annika Schauff (SUI)
2015	Simona Porubanová (SVK)	Hanna Kurek (POL)	(25x17px)
2016	Not held		
2017	Beatrice Migliorini (ITA)	Mèlanie Chappaz (FRA)	Flora Lesoin (FRA)
2018	Nastasia Gimenez (FRA)	Valentina Höll (AUT)	Lelia Tasso (ITA)
2019	Not held		
2020	Not held		
2021	Izabela Yankova (BUL)	Sophie Gutöhrle (AUT)	Kine Haugom (NOR)
2022	Izabela Yankova (BUL)	Kine Haugom (NOR)	Lisa Bouladou (FRA)
2023	Laïs Bonnaure (FRA)	Emy Grandouiller (FRA)	Sofia Priori (ITA)
2024	Ella Svegby (SWE)	Laïs Bonnaure (FRA)	Emma Bindhammer (AUT)
2025	Rosa Zierl (AUT)	Cassandre Peizerat (FRA)	Emma Bindhammer (AUT)
2026	Chloë Cres (FRA)	Ava Chaumet-Lagrange (FRA)	Zoé Lugans (FRA)

=== Marathon ===
==== Men ====
Elite

Year	Gold	Silver	Bronze
2002	Mauro Bettin (ITA)		
2003	Thomas Dietsch (FRA)	Martin Kraler (AUT)	Jure Golčer (SLO)
2004	Thomas Dietsch (FRA)	Roland Stauder (ITA)	Alban Lakata (AUT)
2005	Hannes Genze (GER)	Andreas Kugler (SUI)	Sandro Späth (SUI)
2006	Ralph Näf (SUI)	Thomas Stoll (SUI)	Andreas Kugler (SUI)
2007	Christoph Sauser (SUI)	Christoph Soukup (AUT)	Moritz Milatz (GER)
2008	Alban Lakata (AUT)	Peter Riis Andersen (DEN)	Urs Huber (SUI)
2009	Allan Oras (EST)	Kalle Kriit (EST)	Caspar Austa (EST)
2010	Ralph Näf (SUI)	Mirko Celestino (ITA)	Andreas Kugler (SUI)
2011	Alexey Medvedev (RUS)	Jukka Vastaranta (FIN)	Tim Bohme (GER)
2012	Kristián Hynek (CZE)	Pavel Boudny (CZE)	Alban Lakata (AUT)
2013	Alban Lakata (AUT)	Christoph Sauser (SUI)	Kristián Hynek (CZE)
2014	Christoph Sauser (SUI)	Jaroslav Kulhavý (CZE)	Christoph Soukup (AUT)
2015	Jaroslav Kulhavý (CZE)	Sascha Weber (GER)	Alban Lakata (AUT)
2016	Peeter Pruus (EST)	Tiago Ferreira (POR)	Kristián Hynek (CZE)
2017	Tiago Ferreira (POR)	Alban Lakata (AUT)	Karl Platt (GER)
2018	Aleksey Medvedev (RUS)	Samuele Porro (ITA)	Fabian Rabensteiner (ITA)
2019	Tiago Ferreira (POR)	Samuele Porro (ITA)	Peeter Pruus (EST)
2020	Not held		
2021	Andreas Seewald (GER)	Samuele Porro (ITA)	Martin Stošek (CZE)
2022	Fabian Rabensteiner (ITA)	Krzysztof Łukasik (POL)	Jaroslav Kulhavý (CZE)
2023	Wout Alleman (BEL)	Fabian Rabensteiner (ITA)	Simon Schneller (GER)
2024	Lukas Baum (GER)	David Valero (ESP)	Fabian Rabensteiner (ITA)
2025	Andreas Seewald (GER)	Andrea Siffredi (ITA)	Gioele De Cosmo (ITA)
2026	David Valero (ESP)	Gioele De Cosmo (ITA)	Krzysztof Łukasik (POL)

Under-23

Year	Gold	Silver	Bronze
2008	Jakob Nimpf (AUT)	Daniel Federspiel (AUT)	Vivien Legastelois (FRA)
2010	Konny Looser (SUI)	Matthias Leisling (GER)	Lorenzo Martelli (ITA)
2011	Not held		
2012	Simon Stiebjahn (GER)	Marek Rauchfuss (CZE)	Marcus Nicolai (GER)
2013	Bartłomiej Wawak (POL)	Enea Vetsch (SUI)	Christian Pfäffle (GER)
2014 --- 2026	Not held		

==== Women ====
Year	Gold	Silver	Bronze
2002	Andrea Huser (SUI)		
2003	Birgit Juengst (GER)	Gunn-Rita Dahle (NOR)	Sandra Klose (GER)
2004	Blaža Klemenčič (SLO)	Sandra Klose (GER)	Ilona Bublová (CZE)
2005	Pia Sundstedt (FIN)	Birgit Juengst (GER)	Blaža Klemenčič (SLO)
2006	Gunn-Rita Dahle Flesjå (NOR)	Pia Sundstedt (FIN)	Dolores Maechler-Rupp (SUI)
2007	Sabine Spitz (GER)	Ariëlle van Meurs (NED)	Esther Süss (SUI)
2008	Esther Süss (SUI)	Pia Sundstedt (FIN)	Antonia Wipfli (SUI)
2009	Gunn-Rita Dahle Flesjå (NOR)	Maja Włoszczowska (POL)	Ivanda Eiduka (LAT)
2010	Esther Süss (SUI)	Gunn-Rita Dahle Flesjå (NOR)	Pia Sundstedt (FIN)
2011	Pia Sundstedt (FIN)	Sally Bigham (GBR)	Elena Giacomuzzi (ITA)
2012	Pia Sundstedt (FIN)	Sally Bigham (GBR)	Silke Schmidt (GER)
2013	Esther Süss (SUI)	Sally Bigham (GBR)	Sabine Spitz (GER)
2014	Tereza Huříková (CZE)	Sally Bigham (GBR)	Borghild Løvset (NOR)
2015	Sabine Spitz (GER)	Jolanda Neff (SUI)	Esther Süss (SUI)
2016	Sally Bigham (GBR)	Jennie Stenerhag (SWE)	Katažina Sosna (LTU)
2017	Clàudia Galicia (ESP)*	Angelika Tazreiter (AUT)	Barbara Benkó (HUN)
2018	Gunn-Rita Dahle Flesjå (NOR)	Maja Włoszczowska (POL)	Ariane Lüthi (SUI)
2019	Mara Fumagalli (ITA)	Blaža Pintarič (SLO)	Jennie Stenerhag (SWE)
2020	Not held		
2021	Natalia Fischer (ESP)	Steffi Häberlin (SUI)	Ramona Forchini (SUI)
2022	Natalia Fischer (ESP)	Janina Wüst (SUI)	Claudia Peretti (ITA)
2023	Adelheid Morath (GER)	Estelle Morel (FRA)	Irina Luetzelschwab (SUI)
2024	Rosa van Doorn (NED)	Lejla Njemčević (BIH)	Claudia Peretti (ITA)
2025	Adelheid Morath (GER)	Natalia Fischer (ESP)	Mara Fumagalli (ITA)
2026	Anna Weinbeer (SUI)	Natalia Fischer (ESP)	Paula Gorycka (POL)

(*) 2017 winner, Christina Kollmann-Forstner (AUT), was dispossessed for being linked to Operation Aderlass

=== Four-cross ===
==== Men ====
Year	Gold	Silver	Bronze
2003	Michal Prokop (CZE)	Lukas Tamme (CZE)	Dale Holmes (GBR)
2004	Michal Prokop (CZE)	Lukas Tamme (CZE)	Leiv Ove Nordmark (NOR)
2006	Joost Wichman (NED)	Scott Beaumont (GBR)	Guido Tschugg (GER)
2008	Joost Wichman (NED)	Romain Saladini (FRA)	Dominik Gspan (SUI)
2009	Michal Prokop (CZE)	Roger Rinderknecht (SUI)	Tomas Slavik (CZE)
2010	Joost Wichman (NED)	Tomas Slavik (CZE)	Jurg Meijer (NED)
2011	Not held		
2012	Felix Beckeman (SWE)	Marek Peško (SVK)	Lukáš Mechura (CZE)
2013	Jakub Riha (CZE)	Giovanny Pozzoni (ITA)	Miran Vauh (SLO)
2014	Not held		

==== Women ====
Year	Gold	Silver	Bronze
2003	Anne-Caroline Chausson (FRA)	Laetitia Le Corguille (FRA)	Jana Horáková (CZE)
2004	Anne-Caroline Chausson (FRA)	Jana Horáková (CZE)	Laetitia Le Corguille (FRA)
2008	Sabrina Jonnier (FRA)	Célina Gros (FRA)	Rachel Seydoux (SUI)
2009	Anita Molcik (AUT)	Rachel Seydoux (SUI)	Lucia Oetjen (SUI)
2010	Romana Labounková (CZE)	Anita Molcik (AUT)	Anneke Beerten (NED)
2011	Not held		
2012	Katy Curd (GBR)	Anita Molcik (AUT)	Lucia Oetjen (SUI)
2013	Emmeline Ragot (FRA)	Morgane Charre (FRA)	Tereza Votavova (CZE)
2014	Not held		

=== Dual slalom ===
==== Men ====
Year	Gold	Silver	Bronze
1998	Michael Marosi (CZE)		
1999	Mickael Deldycke (FRA)		
2000	Mickael Deldycke (FRA)	Steve Peat (GBR)	Karim Amour (FRA)
2001	Cédric Gracia (FRA)	Karim Amour (FRA)	Scott Beaumont (GBR)

==== Women ====
Year	Gold	Silver	Bronze
1998	Anne-Caroline Chausson (FRA)		
1999	Tracy Moseley (GBR)		
2000	Céline Gros (FRA)	Nolvenn Lecaer (FRA)	Sarah Stieger (SUI)
2001	Sabrina Jonnier (FRA)	Fionn Griffiths (GBR)	Tracy Moseley (GBR)

=== Mixed relay ===
Year	Gold	Silver	Bronze
2002	France; Julien Absalon; Jean-Eudes Demaret; Laurence Leboucher; Cédric Ravanel	Switzerland; Florian Vogel; Barbara Blatter; Lukas Flückiger; Thomas Kalberer	Czech Republic; Milan Spesny; Jaroslav Kulhavý; Ilona Bublova; Tomas Vokroulik
2003	Switzerland; Ralph Näf; Balz Weber; Nino Schurter; Barbara Blatter	Poland; Marcin Karczyński; Piotr Formicki; Anna Szafraniec; Kryspin Pyrgies	Spain; Carlos Coloma; Ángel Espigares; Margarita Fullana; José Antonio Hermida
2004	Switzerland; Ralph Näf; Nino Schurter; Petra Henzi; Florian Vogel	Germany; Yvonne Kraft; Moritz Milatz; Stefan Sahm; Andi Weinhold	Spain; Iñaki Lejarreta; Margarita Fullana; José Antonio Hermida
2005	Italy; Marco Bui; Toni Longo; Eva Lechner; Johannes Schweiggl	Switzerland; Nino Schurter; Martin Fanger; Petra Henzi; Florian Vogel	Sweden; Emil Lindgren; Mattias Wengelin; Maria Östergren; Fredrik Kessiakoff
2006	Switzerland; Ralph Näf; Petra Henzi; Martin Fanger; Nino Schurter	France; Cédric Ravanel; Severine Hansen; Alexis Vuillermoz; Stéphane Tempier	Sweden; Fredrik Kessiakoff; Emil Lindgren; Maria Ostergren; Matthias Wengelin
2007	Switzerland; Florian Vogel; Thomas Litscher; Petra Henzi; Nino Schurter	France; Alexis Vuillermoz; Fabien Canal; Cécile Ravanel; Cédric Ravanel	Italy; Yader Zoli; Andrea Tiberi; Francesco Aulino; Eva Lechner
2008	France; Jean-Christophe Péraud; Arnaud Jouffroy; Laurence Leboucher; Alexis Vuillermoz	Italy; Marco Aurelio Fontana; Gerhard Kerschbaumer; Eva Lechner; Cristian Cominelli	Sweden; Emil Lindgren; Alexandra Engen; Olof Jonsson; Alexander Wetterhall
2009	Sweden; Emil Lindgren; Tobias Ludvigsson; Matthias Wengelin; Alexandra Engen	Switzerland; Thomas Litscher; Ralph Näf; Roger Walder; Nathalie Schneitter	Netherlands; Michiel van der Heijden; Rudi van Houts; Irjan Luttenberg; Sanne Paasen
2010	Switzerland; Thomas Litscher; Ralph Näf; Roger Walder; Katrin Leumann	Italy; Marco Aurelio Fontana; Maximilian Vieider; Eva Lechner; Gerhard Kerschbaumer	Czech Republic; Ondřej Cink; Tomáš Paprstka; Tereza Huříková; Jan Škarnitzl
2011	France; Fabien Canal; Victor Koretzky; Julie Bresset; Maxime Marotte	Switzerland; Thomas Litscher; Lars Forster; Nathalie Schneitter; Martin Gujan	Italy; Marco Aurelio Fontana; Gerhard Kerschbaumer; Lorenzo Samparisi; Eva Lechner
2012	Italy; Michele Casagrande; Gioele Bertolini; Eva Lechner; Luca Braidot	Switzerland; Martin Gujan; Katrin Leumann; Matthias Stirnemann; Dominic Zumstein	Netherlands; Michiel van der Heijden; Jesper Slik; Anne Terpstra; Henk-Jaap Moorlag
2013	Italy; Gioele Bertolini; Eva Lechner; Marco Aurelio Fontana; Gerhard Kerschbaumer	Switzerland; Reto Indergand; Dominic Grab; Jolanda Neff; Nino Schurter	Czech Republic; Jan Nesvadba; Jan Vastl; Kateřina Nash; Ondřej Cink
2014	France; Jordan Sarrou; Hugo Pigeon; Margot Moschetti; Maxime Marotte	Germany; Ben Zwiehoff; Tobias Eise; Helen Grobert; Moritz Milatz	Italy; Maximilian Vieider; Moreno Pellizzon; Lisa Rabensteiner; Marco Aurelio Fontana
2015	Germany; Maximilian Brandl; Ben Zwiehoff; Helen Grobert; Manuel Fumic	Switzerland; Reto Indergand; Arnaud Hertling; Esther Süss; Andri Frischknecht	Czech Republic; Jan Vastl; Matěj Průdek; Barbora Průdková; Jaroslav Kulhavý
2016	Switzerland; Marcel Guerrini; Vital Albin; Jolanda Neff; Lars Forster	France; Victor Koretzky; Axel Zingle; Pauline Ferrand-Prévot; Jordan Sarrou	Germany; Georg Egger; Niklas Schehl; Sabine Spitz; Ben Zwiehoff
2017	Switzerland; Filippo Colombo; Joel Roth; Linda Indergand; Alessandra Keller; Andri Frischknecht	Denmark; Sebastian Carstensen Fini; Alexander Andersen; Caroline Bohé; Simon Andreassen; Malene Degn	Italy; Gerhard Kerschbaumer; Chiara Teocchi; Juri Zanotti; Marika Tovo; Nadir Colledani
2018	Italy; Luca Braidot; Marika Tovo; Filipo Fontana; Chiara Teocchi; Juri Zanotti	Switzerland; Joris Ryf; Alexandre Balmer; Alessandra Keller; Sina Frei; Filippo Colombo	Denmark; Jonas Lindberg; Alexander Young Andersen; Simon Andreassen; Caroline Bohe; Malene Degn
2019	Switzerland; Joel Roth; Dario Lillo; Ramona Forchini; Sina Frei; Andri Frischknecht	Italy; Simone Avondetto; Andrea Colombo; Eva Lechner; Martina Berta; Luca Braidot	Denmark; Sebastian Carstensen; Markus Heuer; Sofie Pedersen; Caroline Bohé; Simon Andreassen
2020	Italy; Luca Braidot; Eva Lechner; Filippo Agostinacchio; Nicole Pesse; Marika Tovo; Juri Zanotti	France; Mathis Azzaro; Luca Martin; Loana Lecomte; Olivia Onesti; Lena Gerault; Jordan Sarrou	Switzerland; Fabio Püntener; Janis Baumann; Alessandra Keller; Noëlle Buri; Elisa Alvarez; Thomas Litscher
2021	Italy; Luca Braidot; Filippo Agostinacchio; Martina Berta; Sara Cortinovis; Marika Tovo; Juri Zanotti	Switzerland; Vital Albin; Nils Aebersold; Alessandra Keller; Jacqueline Schneebeli; Lea Huber; Alexandre Balmer	Germany; Leon Kaiser; Lars Gräter; Nina Benz; Finja Lipp; Ronja Eibl; Niklas Schehl
2022	Netherlands; Tom Schellekens; Rens Manen; Fem van Empel; Lauren Molengraaf; Puck Pieterse; David Haverdings	Italy; Marco Betteo; Fabio Bassignana; Giorgia Marchet; Valentina Corvi; Giada Specia; Simone Avondetto	Germany; Paul Schehl; Lennart Krayer; Finja Lipp; Sina Thiel; Antonia Weeger; Leon Kaiser
2023	Denmark; Gustav Pedersen; Albert Withen Philipsen; Julie Lillelund; Sofie Pedersen; Malene Degn; Sebastian Fini Carstensen	France; Adrien Boichis; Julien Hémon; Noémie Garnier; Line Burquier; Anaïs Moulin; Mathis Guay	Italy; Gabriel Borre; Elian Paccagnella; Elisa Lanfranchi; Sara Cortinovis; Valentina Corvi; Andreas Vittone
2024	Italy; Simone Avondetto; Matteo Siffredi; Chiara Teocchi; Giada Martinoli; Valentina Corvi; Mattia Stenico	France; Yannis Musy; Nicolas Kalanquin; Olivia Onesti; Tatiana Tournut; Anaïs Moulin; Titouan Carod	Switzerland; Finn Treudler; Nicolas Halter; Ramona Forchini; Anina Hutter; Muriel Furrer; Thomas Litscher
2025	Italy; Juri Zanotti; Elian Paccagnella; Martina Berta; Elisa Ferri; Valentina Corvi; Ettore Fabbro	Switzerland; Finn Treudler; Lewin Iten; Ramona Forchini; Fiona Schibler; Anja Grossmann; Nino Schurter	Germany; Leon Kaiser; Max Ebrecht; Carla Hahn; Paulina Lange; Nina Graf; Benjamin Krüger

=== Trials ===
==== Men ====
Elite 20"

Year	Gold	Silver	Bronze
2013	Abel Mustieles (ESP)	Ion Areitio (ESP)	Rick Koekoek (NED)
2014	Abel Mustieles (ESP)	Benito Ros (ESP)	Rick Koekoek (NED)
2015	Benito Ros (ESP)	Abel Mustieles (ESP)	Alex Rudeau (FRA)
2016	Abel Mustieles (ESP)	Benito Ros (ESP)	Joacim Nymann (SWE)
2017	Not held		
2018	Ion Areitio (ESP)	Thomas Pechhacker (AUT)	Dominik Oswald (GER)
2019	Dominik Oswald (GER)	Alejandro Montalvo (ESP)	Thomas Pechhacker (AUT)
2023	Borja Conejos (ESP)	Alejandro Montalvo (ESP)	Dominik Oswald (GER)
2024	Eloi Palau (ESP)	Borja Conejos (ESP)	Alejandro Montalvo (ESP)
2025	Alejandro Montalvo (ESP)	Robin Berchiatti (FRA)	Borja Conejos (ESP)
2026	Alejandro Montalvo (ESP)	Borja Conejos (ESP)	Niilo Stenvall (FIN)

Elite 26"

Year	Gold	Silver	Bronze
2013	Gilles Coustellier (FRA)	Vincent Hermance (FRA)	Aurelien Fontenoy (FRA)
2014	Gilles Coustellier (FRA)	Kenny Belaey (BEL)	Vincent Hermance (FRA)
2015	Jack Carthy (GBR)	Vincent Hermance (FRA)	Giacomo Coustellier (FRA)
2016	Gilles Coustellier (FRA)	Vincent Hermance (FRA)	Aurelien Fontenoy (FRA)
2017	Not held		
2018	Jack Carthy (GBR)	Nicolas Vallée (FRA)	Pol Tarrés (ESP)
2019	Jack Carthy (GBR)	Nicolas Vallée (FRA)	Sergi Llongueras (ESP)
2023	Jack Carthy (GBR)	Daniel Barón (ESP)	Julen Sáenz (ESP)
2024	Jack Carthy (GBR)	Charlie Rolls (GBR)	Julen Sáenz (ESP)
2025	Charlie Rolls (GBR)	Jack Carthy (GBR)	Oliver Weightman (GBR)
2026	Julen Sáenz (ESP)	Charlie Rolls (GBR)	Daniel Barón (ESP)

Juniors 20"

Year	Gold	Silver	Bronze
2013	Dominik Oswald (GER)	Lucas Krell (GER)	Bernat Seuba (ESP)
2014	Dominik Oswald (GER)	Alessio Povolo (ITA)	Sebastian Krell (GER)
2015	Dominik Oswald (GER)	Sebastián Ruiz (ESP)	Nicolas Fleury (FRA)
2016	Eloi Palau (ESP)	Sebastián Ruiz (ESP)	Samuel Hlavatý (SVK)
2017	Not held		
2018	Alejandro Montalvo (ESP)	Noah Sandritter (GER)	Martí Arán (ESP)
2019	Charlie Rolls (GBR)	Toni Guillén (ESP)	Antonio Fraile (ESP)
2023	Niilo Stenvall (FIN)	Robin Berchiatti (FRA)	David Oliver Weightman (GBR)
2024	Víctor Pérez (ESP)	Guillaume Camus (FRA)	Travis Asenjo (ESP)
2025	Guillaume Camus (FRA)	Travis Asenjo (ESP)	Guillem Montoya (ESP)
2026	Guillem Montoya (ESP)	Louis Chasseuil (FRA)	Travis Asenjo (ESP)

Juniors 26"

Year	Gold	Silver	Bronze
2013	Jack Carthy (GBR)	Jeremy Descloux (FRA)	Jonathan Sandritter (GER)
2014	Jack Carthy (GBR)	Sergi Llongueras (ESP)	Nicolas Vallée (FRA)
2015	Nicolas Vallée (FRA)	Jordi Araque (ESP)	Tom Blaser (SUI)
2016	Nicolas Vallée (FRA)	Jordi Araque (ESP)	Noah Cardona (FRA)
2017	Not held		
2018	Oliver Widmann (GER)	Nathan Charra (FRA)	Romain Lassance (BEL)
2019	Oliver Widmann (GER)	Vito Gonzalez (SUI)	Daniel Barón (ESP)
2023	Daniel Cegarra (ESP)	Luka Pasturel (FRA)	Titouan Corre (FRA)
2024	Ferrán Gonzalo (ESP)	Vojtěch Hendrych (CZE)	Pacôme Grimaud (FRA)
2025	Zalán Fark (HUN)	Mikel Azcona (ESP)	Ferrán Gonzalo (ESP)
2026	Guim Jódar (ESP)	Zalán Fark (HUN)	Levente Balog (HUN)

==== Women ====
Elite 20"

Year	Gold	Silver	Bronze
2013	Gemma Abant (ESP)	Tatiána Janíčková (SVK)	Mireia Abant (ESP)
2014	Tatiána Janíčková (SVK)	Gemma Abant (ESP)	Nina Reichenbach (GER)
2015	Tatiána Janíčková (SVK)	Nina Reichenbach (GER)	Kristína Sýkorová (SVK)
2016	Tatiána Janíčková (SVK)	Nina Reichenbach (GER)	Debi Studer (SUI)
2017	Not held		
2018	Nina Reichenbach (GER)	Manon Basseville (FRA)	Alba Hidalgo (ESP)
2019	Nina Reichenbach (GER)	Manon Basseville (FRA)	Vera Barón (ESP)
2023	Vera Barón (ESP)	Alba Riera (ESP)	Nina Reichenbach (GER)
2024	Vera Barón (ESP)	Nina Reichenbach (GER)	Eliška Hříbková (CZE)
2025	Vera Barón (ESP)	Alba Riera (ESP)	Nina Vabre (FRA)
2026	Alba Riera (ESP)	Vera Barón (ESP)	Nina Vabre (FRA)

Juniors 20"

Year	Gold	Silver	Bronze
2024	Andrea Pérez (ESP)	Emilia Keikus (GER)	Nina Vabre (FRA)
2025	Andrea Pérez (ESP)	Emilia Keikus (GER)	Yun Vilajosana (ESP)
2026	Andrea Pérez (ESP)	Yun Vilajosana (ESP)	Nina Rubattel (SUI)
