= Nathalie Schneitter =

Swiss mountain biker

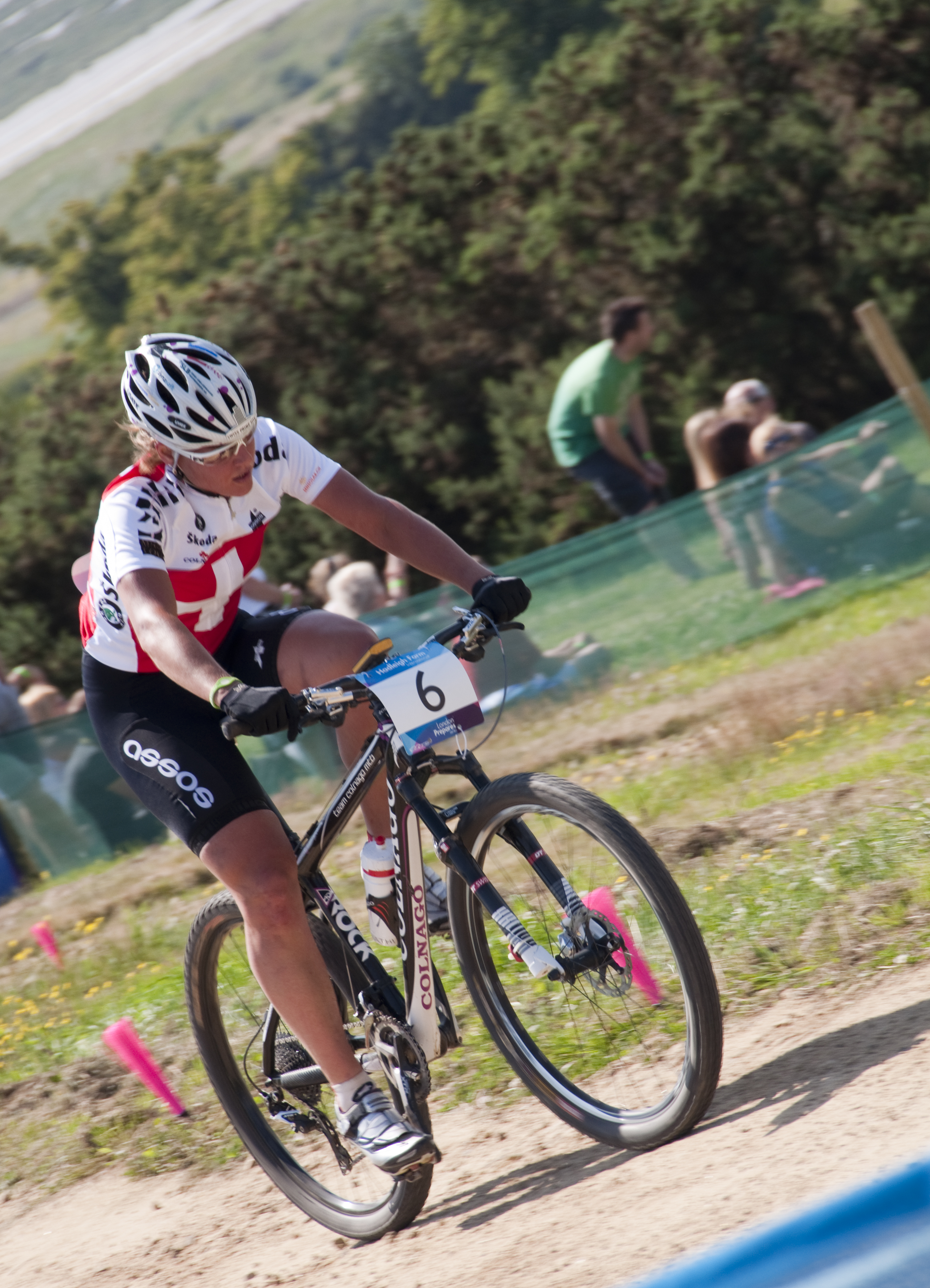

Personal information
- Full name: Nathalie Jessica Schneitter
- Born: 19 June 1986 (age 40) Lommiswil, Switzerland
- Height: 1.66 m (5 ft 5 1/2 in)
- Weight: 59 kg (130 lb)

Cycling career
- Sport: Cycling
- Current team: Colnago-Fabre-Sudtirol
- Discipline: Mountain biking
- Role: Rider
- Rider type: Cross-country

Professional teams
- 2008–2009: Colnago-Cap-Arreghini
- 2010: Colnago-Arreghini-Sudtirol
- 2011–: Colnago-Fabre-Sudtirol
Medal record
Representing Switzerland
Women's Mountain bike racing
World Championships
Silver medal – second place	2024 Vallnord	E-MTB Cross-country

Nathalie Jessica Schneitter (born 19 June 1986 in Lommiswil) is a Swiss professional mountain biker. Throughout her sporting career, she has won numerous Swiss national championship titles (both under the junior and elite category), and more importantly, a gold medal in the under-23 category at the 2008 European Mountain Bike Championships. Schneitter also handed an opportunity to represent her nation Switzerland at the 2008 Summer Olympics, and later rode professionally for more than five seasons on an exclusive sponsorship contract with the Colnago Team.

== Racing career ==
Schneitter sought sporting headlines on the international scene at the 2008 European Mountain Bike Championships in Sankt Wendel, Germany, where she held off a tight battle against Slovenia's Tanja Žakelj and Czech Republic's Tereza Huříková for the gold medal in the women's under-23 cross-country race, adding a silver to her early career resume from the World Junior Championships in Val di Sole, Italy.

Few months later, Schneitter qualified for the Swiss squad, along with her teammate and 2007 world champion Petra Henzi, in the women's cross-country race at the 2008 Summer Olympics in Beijing by receiving one of the nation's two available berths for her team from the Union Cycliste Internationale (UCI), based on her best performance at the World Cup series and Mountain Biking World Rankings. At the start of the race, Schneitter landed on her head into the ground on the initial lap, but managed to successfully complete a 4.8-km sturdy, treacherous cross-country course with a career-high, fifteenth-place effort in 1:53:42.

Shortly after the Olympics, Schneitter signed an exclusive sponsorship contract with Colnago-Cap-Arreghini Team for two additional seasons, followed by her short stint on Colnago-Arreghini-Sudtirol in 2010. In that same year, she defeated Italian rider Eva Lechner for the gold medal in the women's cross-country race at the fourth stage of the Nissan UCI MTB World Cup in Champéry, and later continued to flourish her mountain biking success by taking home the silver for her Swiss squad in the mixed team relay at the 2011 UCI World Championships.

Schneitter sought to compete for her second Swiss squad at the 2012 Summer Olympics in London, but suffered heavily with a shoulder injury from the bike crash that sidelined her Olympic bid at the final stage of the UCI World Cup in La Bresse, France. She also affiliated with her former rival Lechner to lead Italy's Colnago-Fabre-Südtirol for three more seasons, as her exclusive contract with the team was officially renewed until 2014.

== Career achievements ==
2006
1st Karapoti Classic (NZL)
2008
(gold) European Championships (Cross-country, U23), Sankt Wendel (GER)
(silver) UCI World Championships (Cross-country, U23), Val di Sole (ITA)
15th Olympic Games (Cross-country), Beijing (CHN)
2010
5th Overall, UCI World Cup

(gold) Stage 4 (Cross-country), Champéry (SUI)

7th European Championships (Cross-country), Haifa (ISR)
2011
1st Swiss MTB Championships (Cross-country), Champéry (SUI)
(silver) UCI World Championships (Cross-country, Team relay), Champéry (SUI)
5th UCI World Championships (Cross-country), Champéry (SUI)
8th Overall, UCI World Cup
2013
2nd Australian MTB National Series, Mount Buller, Victoria (AUS)
9th European Championships (Eliminator sprint), Bern (SUI)
11th European Championships (Cross-country), Bern (SUI)
11th UCI World Championships (Eliminator sprint), Pietermaritzburg (RSA)
15th UCI World Championships (Cross-country), Pietermaritzburg (RSA)
