= 2016 European Mountain Bike Championships =

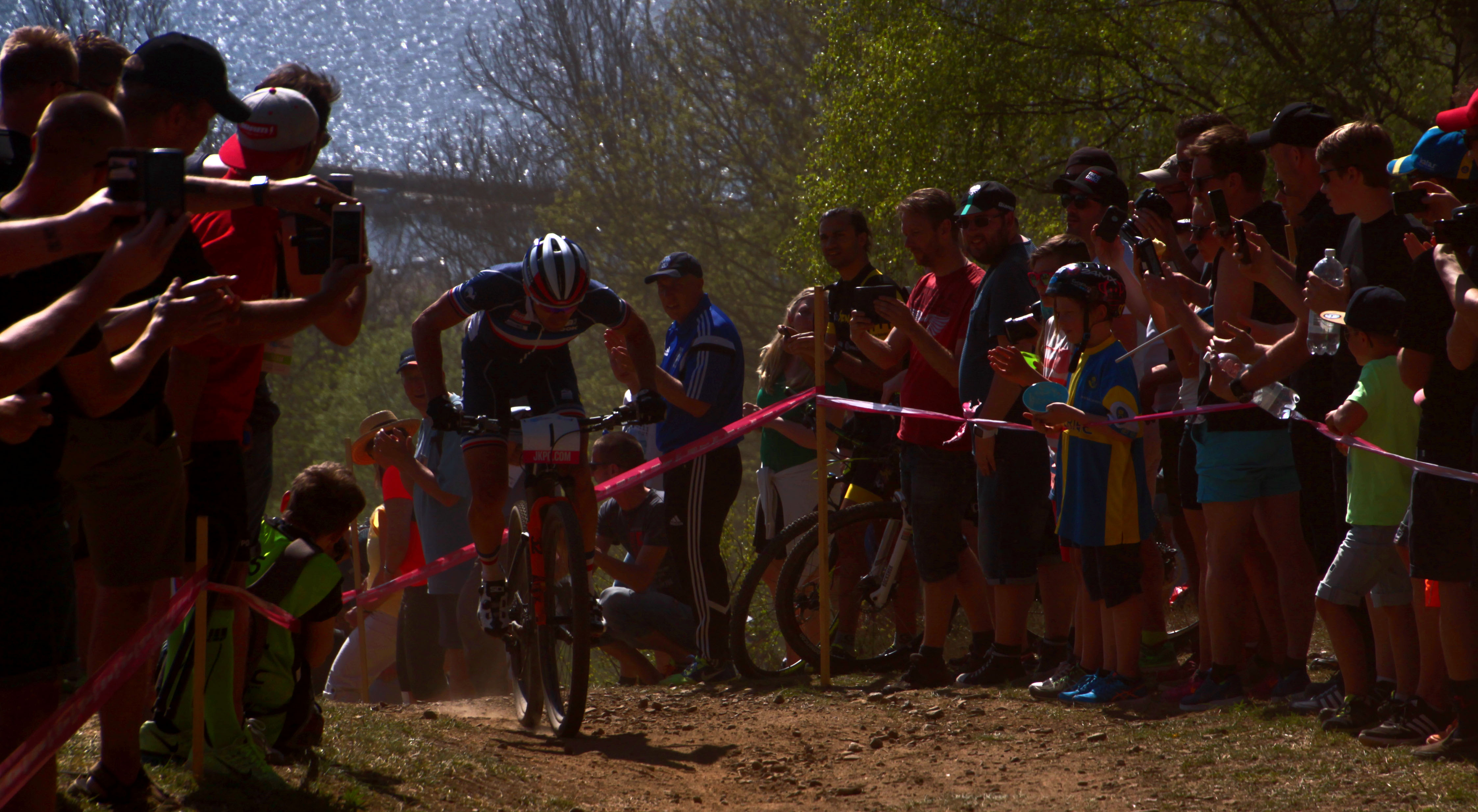
- Venue: Huskvarna Sweden
- Date(s): 5-8 May 2016
- Coordinates: 57°48′N 14°16′E
- Events: 5 (senior)

The 2016 European Mountain Bike Championships were held in Huskvarna, Sweden, between 5 and 8 May 2016.

== Medal summary ==
=== Cross-country ===
Event	Gold	Silver	Bronze
Elite
Men	Julien Absalon (FRA)	Fabian Giger (SUI)	Ondřej Cink (CZE)
Women	Jolanda Neff (SUI)	Annika Langvad (DEN)	Sabine Spitz (GER)
Mixed relay	(SUI); Marcel Guerrini; Vital Albin; Jolanda Neff; Lars Forster	(FRA); Victor Koretzky; Axel Zingle; Pauline Ferrand-Prévot; Jordan Sarrou	(GER); Georg Egger; Niklas Schehl; Sabine Spitz; Ben Zwiehoff
Under-23
Men	Victor Koretzky (FRA)	Titouan Carod (FRA)	Marcel Guerrini (SUI)
Women	Sina Frei (SUI)	Jenny Rissveds (SWE)	Evie Richards (GBR)
Juniors
Boys	Thomas Bonnet (FRA)	Vital Albin (SUI)	Axel Zingle (FRA)
Girls	Sophie Wright (GBR)	Hélène Clauzel (FRA)	Caroline Bohé (DEN)

=== Cross-country eliminator ===
Event	Gold	Silver	Bronze
Elite
Men	Emil Linde (SWE)	Daniel Federspiel (AUT)	Martin Setterberg (SWE)
Women	Iryna Popova (UKR)	Anne Terpstra (NED)	Anna Oberparleiter (ITA)

== See also ==
- 2016 UCI Mountain Bike & Trials World Championships
- 2016 UCI Mountain Bike World Cup
