= Vital Albin =

Swiss cyclist

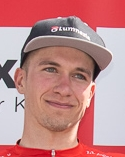
- Albin in 2021

Personal information
- Born: 31 July 1998 (age 28)

Cycling career
- Sport: Cycling
- Discipline: Cross-country
- Role: Rider
Medal record
Representing Switzerland
Men's Mountain bike racing
World Championships
Silver medal – second place	2017 Nové Město na Moravě	Junior Cross-country
Bronze medal – third place	2017 Nové Město na Moravě	Team relay
Bronze medal – third place	2019 Mont-Sainte-Anne	Under-23 Cross-country
European Championships
Gold medal – first place	2016 Jonkoping	Team relay
Silver medal – second place	2016 Jonkoping	Junior Cross-country
Silver medal – second place	2020 Monteceneri	Under-23 Cross-country
Silver medal – second place	2021 Novi Sad	Team relay

Vital Albin (born 31 July 1998) is a Swiss cyclist, who specializes in cross-country mountain biking.

== Major results ==
2016
1st Team relay, UEC European Championships
1st Cross-country, National Junior Championships
2nd Cross-country, UEC European Junior Championships
3rd Cross-country, UCI World Junior Championships
3rd Team relay, UCI World Championships
2019
3rd Cross-country, UCI World Under-23 Championships
2020
UCI Under-23 XCO World Cup

3rd Nové Město I
3rd Nové Město II

2nd Cross-country, UEC European Under-23 Championships
2021
2nd Team relay, UEC European Championships
2022
Swiss Bike Cup

1st Gränichen

UCI XCC World Cup

3rd Leogang

2023
3rd Cross-country, National Championships
Ökk Bike Revolution

3rd Engelberg
