= Christoph Soukup =

Austrian cyclist

Personal information
- Full name: Christoph Reinhold Soukup
- Born: 11 October 1980 (age 46) Vienna, Austria
- Height: 1.84 m (6 ft 0 in)
- Weight: 71 kg (157 lb)

Cycling career
- Sport: Cycling
- Current team: Hitec Team
- Discipline: Mountain biking
- Role: Rider
- Rider type: Cross-country

Professional teams
- 2006-2008: Fuji Bikes
- 2009–2010: Merida Biking Team
- 2011–: Hitec Team

Christoph Reinhold Soukup (born October 11, 1980 in Vienna) is an Austrian professional mountain biker.

== Career ==
Riding the sport for more than 15 years, Soukup has won fourteen Austrian national championship titles in men's mountain biking (both cross-country and marathon races), and later represented his nation Austria in two editions of the Olympic Games (2004 and 2008), where he installed top-fifteen finishes in the same tournament. Throughout his sporting career, Soukup has been training and racing professionally for more than a decade on the Hitec Sports Team, although he had appeared short stints under a sponsorship contract with the Team FujiBikes and Mérida Biking Team.

Soukup first competed for Austria at the 2004 Summer Olympics in Athens, where he finished fifteenth in the men's cross-country race with a time of 2:22:50, trailing behind Polish rider and four-time Olympian Marek Galiński on a tight sprint duel by 36 seconds.

At the 2008 Summer Olympics in Beijing, Soukup qualified for his second Austrian squad in the men's cross-country race by receiving an automatic berth from the Austrian Cycling Federation (German: Österreichischer Radsport-Verband, ORV) and the Union Cycliste Internationale (UCI), based on his top-five performance at the World Cup series, World and European Championships, and Mountain Biking World Series. Despite having suffered a sore throat and slight fever shortly before the race, Soukup recorded his highest career position on a 4.8-km sturdy, treacherous cross-country course with a much stronger, sixth-place time in 2:00:11, but narrowly missed the Olympic podium by two minutes.

Soukup also sought a bid for his third Austrian squad at the 2012 Summer Olympics in London, but decided to pull himself off shortly from the final stage of the UCI World Cup in La Bresse, France due to a sustained scaphoid injury.

== Career achievements ==
2004
1st Kos Cup (Cross-country), Greece
1st XC Samobor (Cross-country, Elite/U23), Samobor (CRO)
15th Olympic Games (Cross-country), Athens (GRE)
2005
1st Austrian MTB Championships (Cross-country), Austria
2006
7th Stage 6, UCI World Cup, Schladming (AUT)
2007
1st Austrian MTB Championships (Cross-country), Austria
11th UCI World Championships (Cross-country), Fort William (GBR)
2008
1st Austrian MTB Championships (Cross-country), Austria
1st Heubach MTB Classic, Heubach (GER)
5th European Championships (Cross-country), Sankt Wendel (GER)
6th Olympic Games (Cross-country), Beijing (CHN)
6th UCI World Championships (Cross-country), Val di Sole (ITA)
7th Stage 3, UCI World Cup (Cross-country), Madrid, Parque Casa de Campo (ES)
7th Stage 4, UCI World Cup (Cross-country), Fort William (GBR)
2009
1st Kamptal Klassik, Austria
3rd Overall, Afxentia Stage Race, Cyprus

3rd Stage 1 & 3

4th UCI World Championships (Marathon), Graz (AUT)
2010
1st Austrian MTB Championships (Cross-country), Haiming (AUT)
6th European Championships (Cross-country), Haifa (ISR)
2012
1st Austrian MTB Championships (Cross-country), Stattegg (AUT)
2013
1st Austrian MTB Championships (Marathon), Graz (AUT)
3rd Austrian MTB Championships (Cross-country), Austria
