= Ben Zwiehoff =

German cyclist

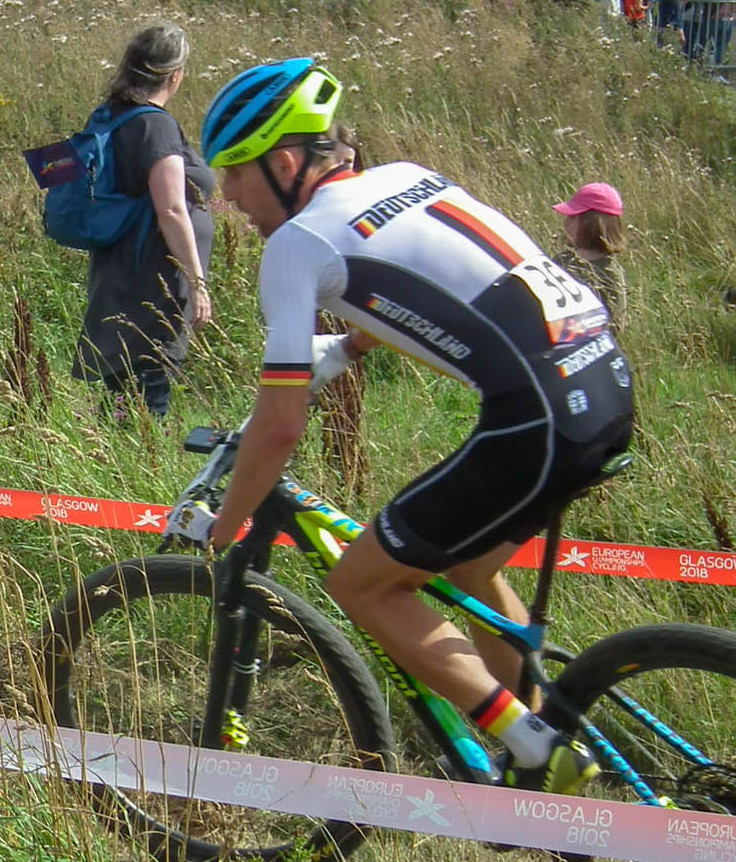
- Zwiehoff in 2018

Personal information
- Born: 22 February 1994 (age 32) Essen, Germany
- Height: 182 cm (6 ft 0 in)
- Weight: 61 kg (134 lb)

Cycling career
- Sport: Cycling
- Current team: Red Bull–Bora–Hansgrohe
- Disciplines: Road; Mountain bike
- Role: Rider
- Rider type: Cross-country

Amateur teams
- 2005–2014: SV Steele
- 2012–2019: Team Bergamont
- 2013–2014: Team Rose NRW
- 2015–2020: MSV Essen–Steele 2011

Professional teams
- 2020: Team Centurion–Vaude
- 2021–: Bora–Hansgrohe
Medal record
Representing Germany
Mountain bike racing
European Championships
Gold medal – first place	2015 Chies d'Alpago	Mixed team relay
Silver medal – second place	2014 Sankt Wendel	Mixed team relay
Bronze medal – third place	2016 Huskvarna	Mixed team relay

Ben Zwiehoff (born 22 February 1994) is a German cross-country and road cyclist, who currently rides for UCI WorldTeam Red Bull–Bora–Hansgrohe. He won three medals in the European Mountain Bike Championships from to 2014 to 2016.

== Major results ==
=== Mountain bike ===
2013
3rd Vejle
2014
2nd Team relay, UEC European Championships
2015
1st Team relay, UEC European Championships
2nd Solingen
3rd Antalya
3rd Lohr am Main
2016
MTB Bundesliga

1st Nürburg
1st Ortenberg

1st Antalya
UEC European Championships

3rd Team relay
4th Under-23 Cross-country

UCI Under-23 World Cup

5th Mont-Sainte-Anne

2017
1st Solingen
MTB Bundesliga

2nd Lohr-Wombach
3rd Gedern

2nd Igualada
2018
2nd Lennestadt-Saalhausen
2nd Velsen-Zuid
3rd Cross-country, National Championships
2019
2nd Cross-country, National Championships
2020
2nd Overall Jaén-Córdoba

=== Road ===
2022
9th Trofeo Serra de Tramuntana
10th Trofeo Calvià
2023
2nd Overall Tour of Turkey
2nd Overall Czech Tour
7th Overall Tour of Slovenia
7th Overall Settimana Internazionale di Coppi e Bartali
8th Overall UAE Tour
8th Trofeo Calvia
2024
4th Road race, National Championships
5th Giro della Toscana
2025
1st Mountains classification, Tour de Romandie
9th Overall Tour of Guangxi

==== Grand Tour general classification results timeline ====
Grand Tour	2021	2022	2023	2024	2025
Giro d'Italia	—	51	—	—	—
Tour de France	—	—	—	—	
Vuelta a España	47	—	35	—	

Legend
—	Did not compete
DNF	Did not finish
