= Nina Graf =

German cross-country mountain biker

Personal information
- Born: Nina Benz; 30 July 1998 (age 28)

Cycling career
- Sport: Cycling
- Current team: Lexware Mountainbike Team
- Discipline: Mountain bike racing
- Role: Rider
- Rider type: Cross-country

Professional teams
- 2020–2021: JB Brunex Felt Factory Team
- 2022–2024: Lexware Mountainbike Team
- 2025: Lapierre Racing Unity
- 2026–: Trek-Unbroken XC
Medal record
Women's mountain bike racing
Representing Germany
World Championships
Bronze medal – third place	2021 Val di Sole	Mixed relay
European Championships
Bronze medal – third place	2021 Novi Sad	Mixed relay
Bronze medal – third place	2024 Cheile Grădiștei	Cross-country

Nina Graf (née Benz, born 30 July 1998) is a German cross-country mountain biker. She competed in the women's cross-country event at the 2024 Summer Olympics, placing 16th.

== Major results ==
2016
3rd Cross-country, National Junior Championships
2019
2nd Cross-country, National Under-23 Championships
2020
1st Cross-country, National Under-23 Championships
2021
2nd Mixed relay, UCI World Championships
3rd Mixed relay, European Championships
3rd Cross-country, National Championships
2024
3rd Cross-country, European Championships
