= Baptiste Pierron =

French mountain biker

Personal information
- Born: 8 August 1993 (age 33)

Cycling career
- Sport: Cycling
- Discipline: Downhill
- Role: Rider

Professional team
- Team Dorval AM
Medal record
Representing France
Mountain bike racing
European Championships
Gold medal – first place	2019 Pampilhosa da Serra	Downhill

Baptiste Pierron (born 8 August 1993) is a French downhill mountain biker. In 2019, he won the European Downhill Championships in Pampilhosa da Serra, Portugal. His younger brothers Amaury and Antoine also compete in downhill racing.
