= Erich Übelhardt =

Swiss mountain biker

Personal information
- Born: 7 June 1958 (age 68)

Cycling career
- Sport: Cycling
- Discipline: Mountain bike
- Role: Rider
- Rider type: Cross-country
Medal record
Representing Switzerland
Mountain bike racing
European Championships
Gold medal – first place	1991 La Bourboule	Cross-country
Gold medal – first place	1992 Möllbrücke	Cross-country
Bronze medal – third place	1989 Anzère	Cross-country

Erich Übelhardt (born 7 June 1958) is a Swiss former professional cross-country mountain biker. He won the cross-country event at the 1991 and 1992 European Mountain Bike Championships.
