= Ede-Károly Molnár =

Romanian cyclist (born 1996)

Ede Molnár
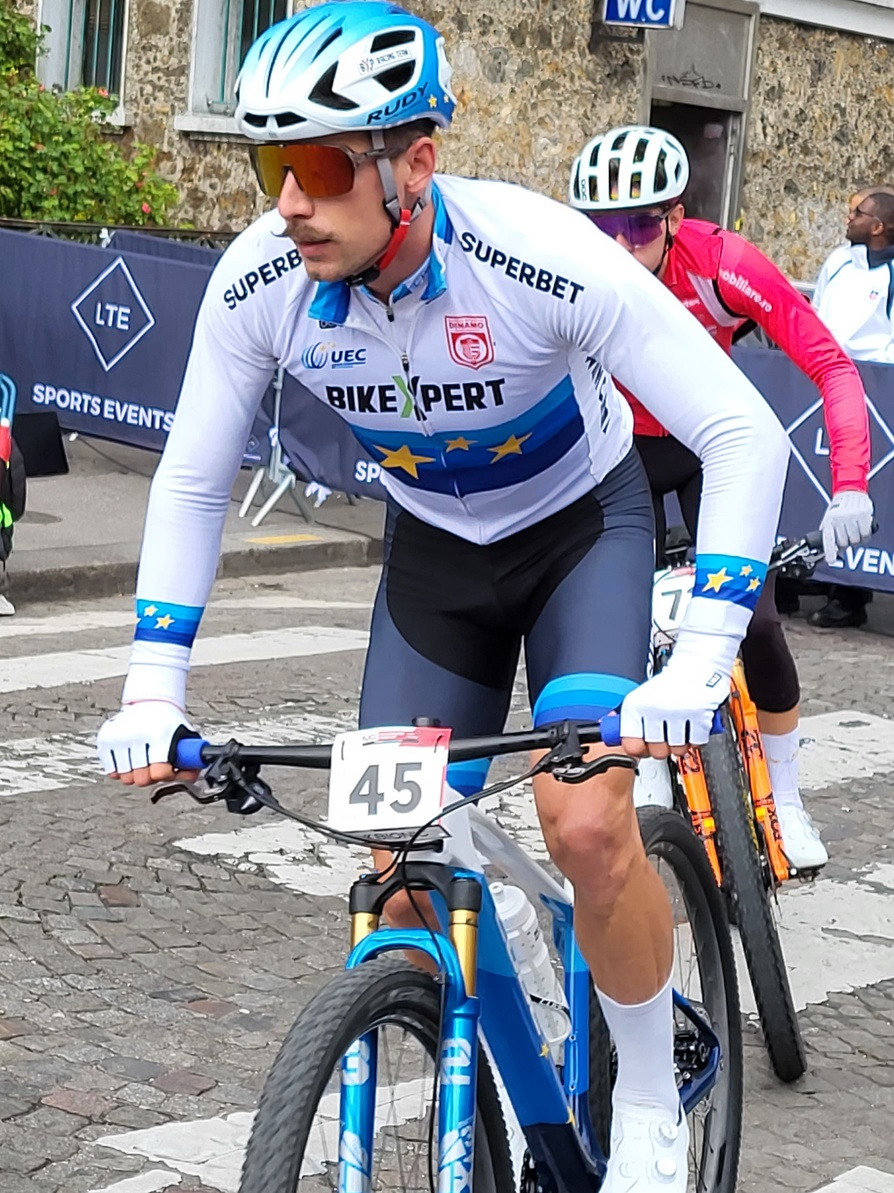
- Molnár in 2024

Personal information
- Full name: Ede-Károly Molnár
- Born: 6 March 1996 (age 30) Romania

Cycling career
- Sport: Cycling
- Current team: Dinamo–Bikexpert–Superbet
- Discipline: Cross-country
- Role: Rider

Professional team
- 2018–: Dinamo–Bikexpert–Superbet
Medal record
Representing Romania
Men's mountain bike racing
European Championships
Gold medal – first place	2023 Sakarya	Cross-country eliminator
Bronze medal – third place	2022 Anadia	Cross-country eliminator

Ede-Károly Molnár (born 6 March 1996) is a Romanian cross-country mountain biker. He competed in the 2024 Summer Olympics. He won the cross-country eliminator event at the 2023 European Mountain Bike Championships. He is also an eight-time national cross-country eliminator champion, and a one-time cross-country marathon champion.

== Major results ==
=== MTB ===
2016
1st Cross-country eliminator, National Championships
2017
1st Cross-country eliminator, National Championships
2016
National Championships

1st Cross-country eliminator
1st Cross-country marathon

2019
1st Cross-country eliminator, National Championships
2020
1st Cross-country eliminator, National Championships
2021
1st Cross-country eliminator, National Championships
2022
1st Cross-country eliminator, National Championships
3rd Cross-country eliminator, European Championships
2023
1st Cross-country eliminator, European Championships
1st Cross-country eliminator, National Championships
2024
UCI XCE World Cup

1st Paris

=== Cyclo-cross ===
2018–2019
2nd National Championships
2019–2020
1st National Championships
2021–2022
3rd National Championships
