= 2020 European Mountain Bike Championships =

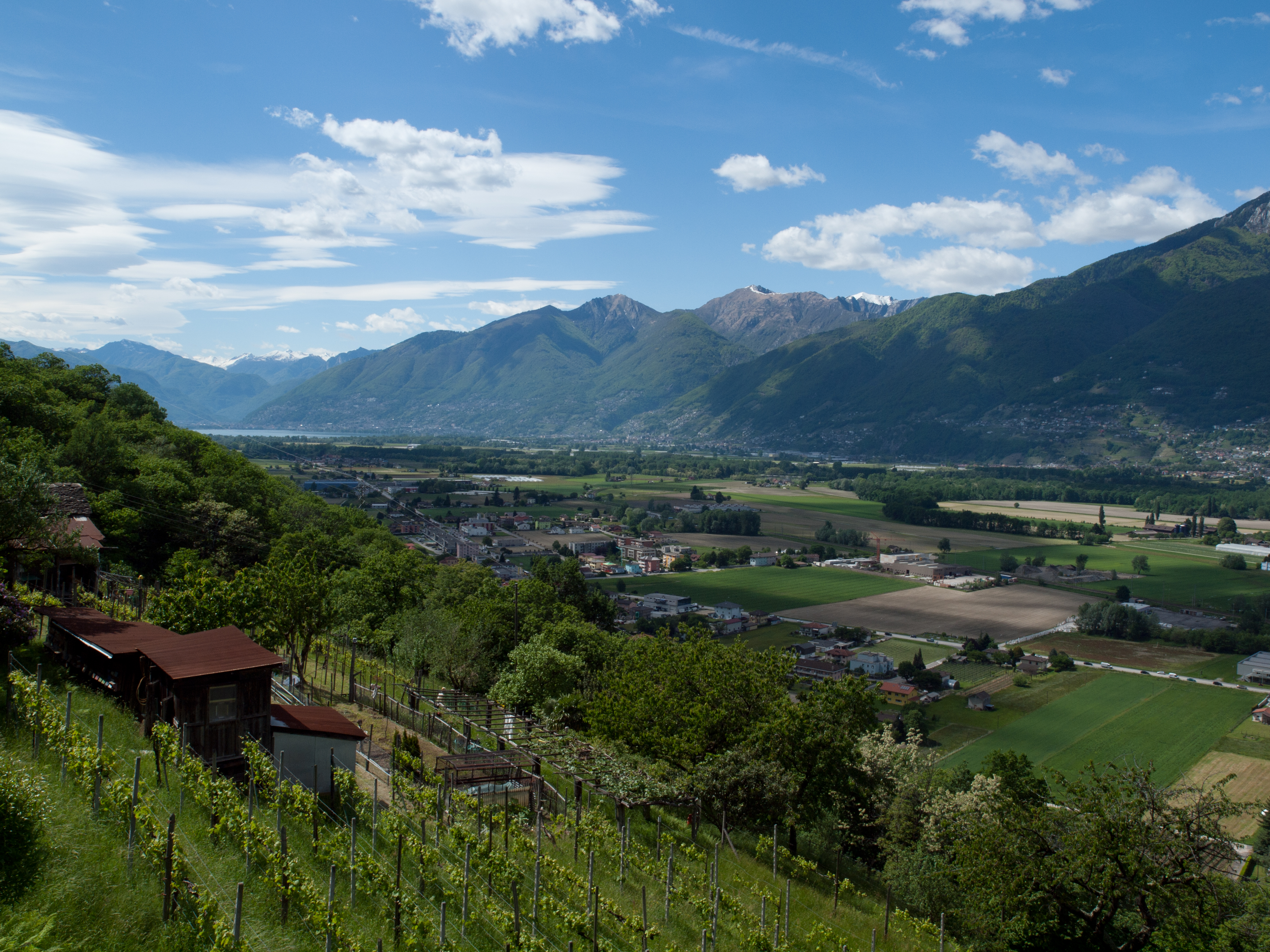
- Venue: Monteceneri Switzerland
- Date(s): 15-18 October 2020
- Coordinates: 46°7′N 08°56′E
- Events: 5

The 2020 European Mountain Bike Championships was the 33rd edition of the European Mountain Bike Championships, an annual mountain biking competition organized by the Union Européenne de Cyclisme (UEC). The championships was held in Monteceneri, Switzerland on from 15 to 18 October 2022.

== Medal summary ==
=== Cross-country ===
Event	Gold		Silver		Bronze	
Men	Nino Schurter; Switzerland	1:27:25.12	Titouan Carod; France	1:27:34.28	Mathias Flückiger; Switzerland	1:28:13.38
Women	Pauline Ferrand-Prévot; France	1:13:24.60	Anne Terpstra; Netherlands	1:14:04.94	Yana Belomoyna; Ukraine	1:14:19.96

=== Cross-country eliminator ===
Event	Gold	Silver	Bronze
Men	Titouan Perrin-Ganier; France	Jeroen van Eck; Netherlands	Hugo Briatta; France
Women	Gaia Tormena; Italy	Linda Indergand; Switzerland	Marion Fromberger; Germany

=== Team Relay ===
Event	Gold		Silver		Bronze	
Mixed Team	Italy Luca Braidot; Eva Lechner; Filippo Agostinacchio; Nicole Pesse; Marika Tovo; Juri Zanotti	1:24:35	France Mathis Azzaro; Luca Martin; Loana Lecomte; Olivia Onesti; Lena Gerault; Jordan Sarrou	1:24:56	Switzerland Fabio Püntener; Janis Baumann; Alessandra Keller; Noëlle Buri; Elisa Alvarez; Thomas Litscher	1:25:21

== Medal table ==
* Host nation (Switzerland)

Rank	Nation	Gold	Silver	Bronze	Total
1	France (FRA)	2	2	1	5
2	Italy (ITA)	2	0	0	2
3	Switzerland (SUI)*	1	1	2	4
4	Netherlands (NED)	0	2	0	2
5	Germany (GER)	0	0	1	1
5	Ukraine (UKR)	0	0	1	1
Totals (6 entries)		5	5	5	15
