= Emil Lindgren =

Swedish cyclist (born 1985)

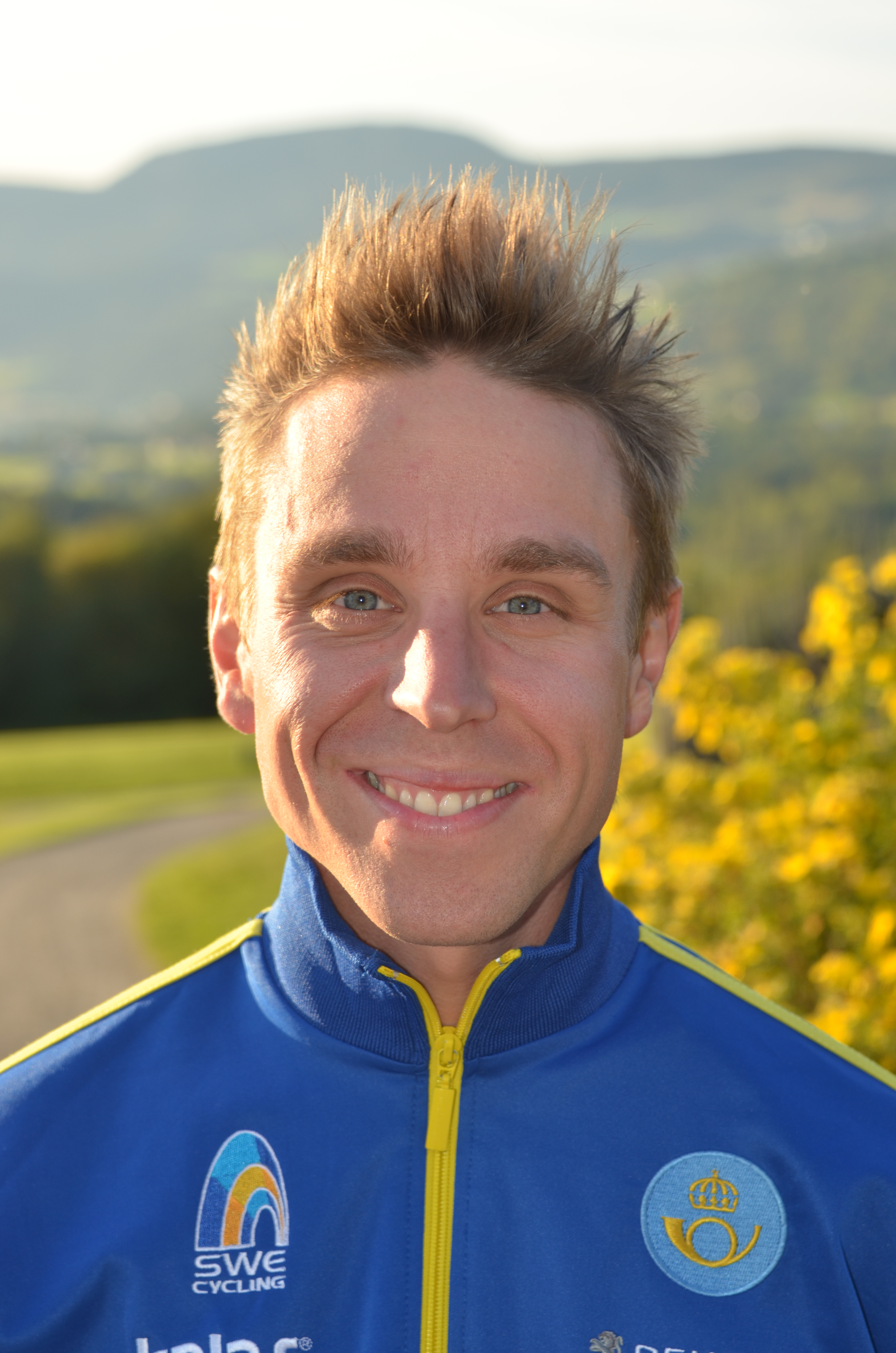
- Emil Lindgren in September 2014

Personal information
- Full name: Karl Emil Lindgren
- Born: 4 May 1985 (age 41) Falun, Sweden
- Height: 1.71 m (5 ft 7 in)
- Weight: 59 kg (130 lb)

Cycling career
- Sport: Cycling
- Current team: Rabobank Giant Pro
- Disciplines: Mountain biking Cyclo-cross
- Role: Rider
- Rider type: Cross-country

Professional teams
- 2004–2006: Bianchi-Agos
- 2007: Gewiss-Bianchi
- 2008: Full Dynamix IT
- 2009: De Brink-Ten Tusscher
- 2010–2012: Rabobank
- 2013–: Rabobank Giant Pro
Medal record
Representing Belgium
Men's mountain bike racing
World Championships
Silver medal – second place	2014 Lillehammer-Hafjell	Cross-country eliminator
European Championships
Gold medal – first place	2009	Team relay
Bronze medal – third place	2005	Team relay
Bronze medal – third place	2006	Team relay
Bronze medal – third place	2008	Team relay

Karl Emil Lindgren (born 4 May 1985 in Falun) is a Swedish professional mountain biker. Riding the sport for more than 15 years, Lindgren has won ten Swedish national championship titles in men's mountain biking (both under the men's junior and elite categories), and later represented his nation Sweden at the 2008 Summer Olympics. In 2009, Lindgren reached the summit of his mountain biking career by grabbing a first-place trophy and a yellow jersey at the Afxentia Stage Race, also known as the Sunshine Cup, in Cyprus. Lindgren currently trains and races professionally for the 2013 season on the Giant Pro XC Team, although he has appeared short stints on Bianchi, Full-Dynamix, De Brink-Ten Tusscher, and Rabobank cycling teams.

Lindgren qualified for the Swedish squad, along with his teammate and two-time Olympian Fredrik Kessiakoff, in the men's cross-country race at the 2008 Summer Olympics in Beijing by receiving one of the nation's two available berths from the Swedish Cycling Federation (Swedish: Svenska Cykelförbundet, SCF) and the Union Cycliste Internationale (UCI), based on his best performance at the World Cup series, World and European Championships, and Mountain Biking World Series. Lindgren could not upgrade a much stellar ride to complete a 4.8-km sturdy, treacherous cross-country course, as he decided to end his course with only two laps left and a thirty-eighth-place finish because of bike problems.

He also competes in cyclo-cross, having won the Swedish National Cyclo-Cross Championships in 2010 and 2020.

== Career achievements ==
2004
1st Swedish MTB Championships (Cross-country, ITT), Sweden
2007
3rd Swedish MTB Championships (Cross-country & team relay), Huskvarna (SWE)
2008
1st Swedish MTB Championships (Team relay), Norberg (SWE)
2nd Swedish MTB Championships (Cross-country), Norberg (SWE)
2nd Swedish MTB Championships (Cyclo-cross), Gothenburg (SWE)
3rd Swedish MTB Championships (Cross-country, ITT), Norberg (SWE)
3rd Stage 1, Afxentia Stage Race, Cyprus
(bronze) European Championships (Team relay), Sankt Wendel (GER)
38th Olympic Games (Cross-country), Beijing (CHN)
2009
1st Overall, Afxentia Stage Race, Cyprus

1st Stages 1, 2, & 3

3rd Swedish MTB Championships (Cyclo-cross), Borås (SWE)
2010
1st Swedish MTB Championships (Cyclo-cross), Sweden
19th UCI World Championships (Cross-country), Mont Sainte-Anne (CAN)
2011
1st Swedish MTB Championships (Cross-country, ITT, & Team relay), Borås (SWE)
18th UCI World Championships (Cross-country), Champéry (SUI)
2012
1st Points classification, Afxentia Stage Race, Cyprus
2nd Overall, Afxentia Stage Race, Cyprus
2013
2nd Langkawi International MTB Challenge, Langkawi (MAS)
2019
1st, Cykelvasan, Sweden
