= Blaža Pintarič =

Slovenian cyclist (born 1980)

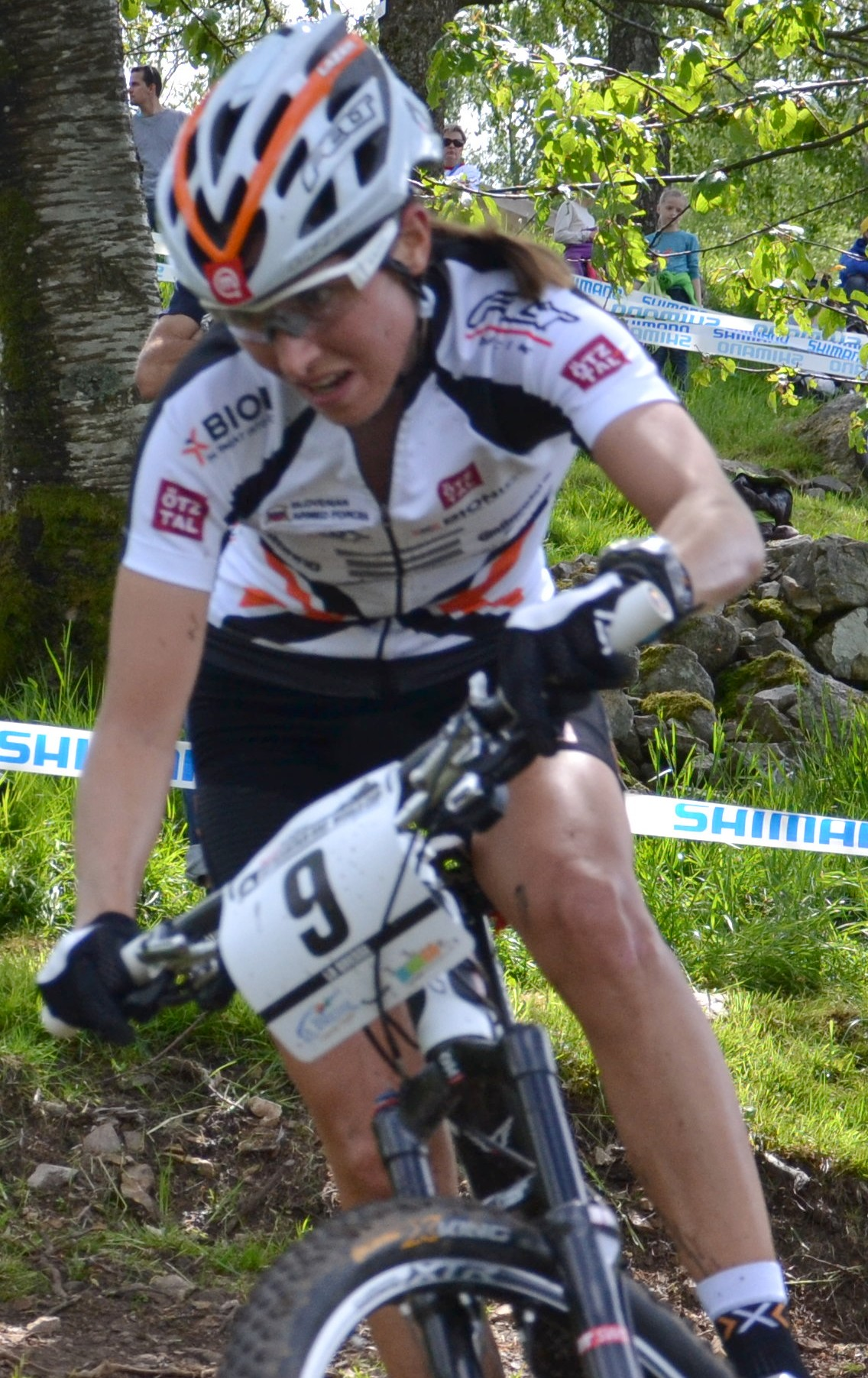
- Klemenčič in 2012

Personal information
- Born: Blaža Klemenčič; 11 March 1980 (age 46) Kranj, Slovenia
- Height: 172 cm (5 ft 8 in) (2015)
- Weight: 55 kg (121 lb) (2015)

Cycling career
- Sport: Cycling
- Discipline: Mountain bike racing
- Role: Rider
- Rider type: Cross-country and marathon
Medal record
Women's mountain bike racing
Representing Slovenia
World Championship
Silver medal – second place	2005 Lillehammer	Marathon
Silver medal – second place	2019 Grächen	Marathon
Bronze medal – third place	2004 Bad Goisern	Marathon
European Championships
Gold medal – first place	2004 Wałbrzych	Marathon
Silver medal – second place	2014 St. Wendel	Marathon
Bronze medal – third place	2005 Kluisbergen	Marathon
Bronze medal – third place	2015 Chies d'Alpago	Marathon

Blaža Pintarič (née Klemenčič, born 11 March 1980) is a Slovenian cyclist. She competed in mountain biking at the 2008 Summer Olympics in Beijing, and at the 2012 Summer Olympics in London.

In 2017, she married her coach Robert Pintarič.

== Doping case ==
Klemenčič was provisionally suspended by UCI in September 2015 for an EPO positive from a sample collected on 27 March 2012.

== See also ==
- List of doping cases in cycling
