= Yana Belomoyna =

Ukrainian cross-country mountain biker

Yana Belomoina
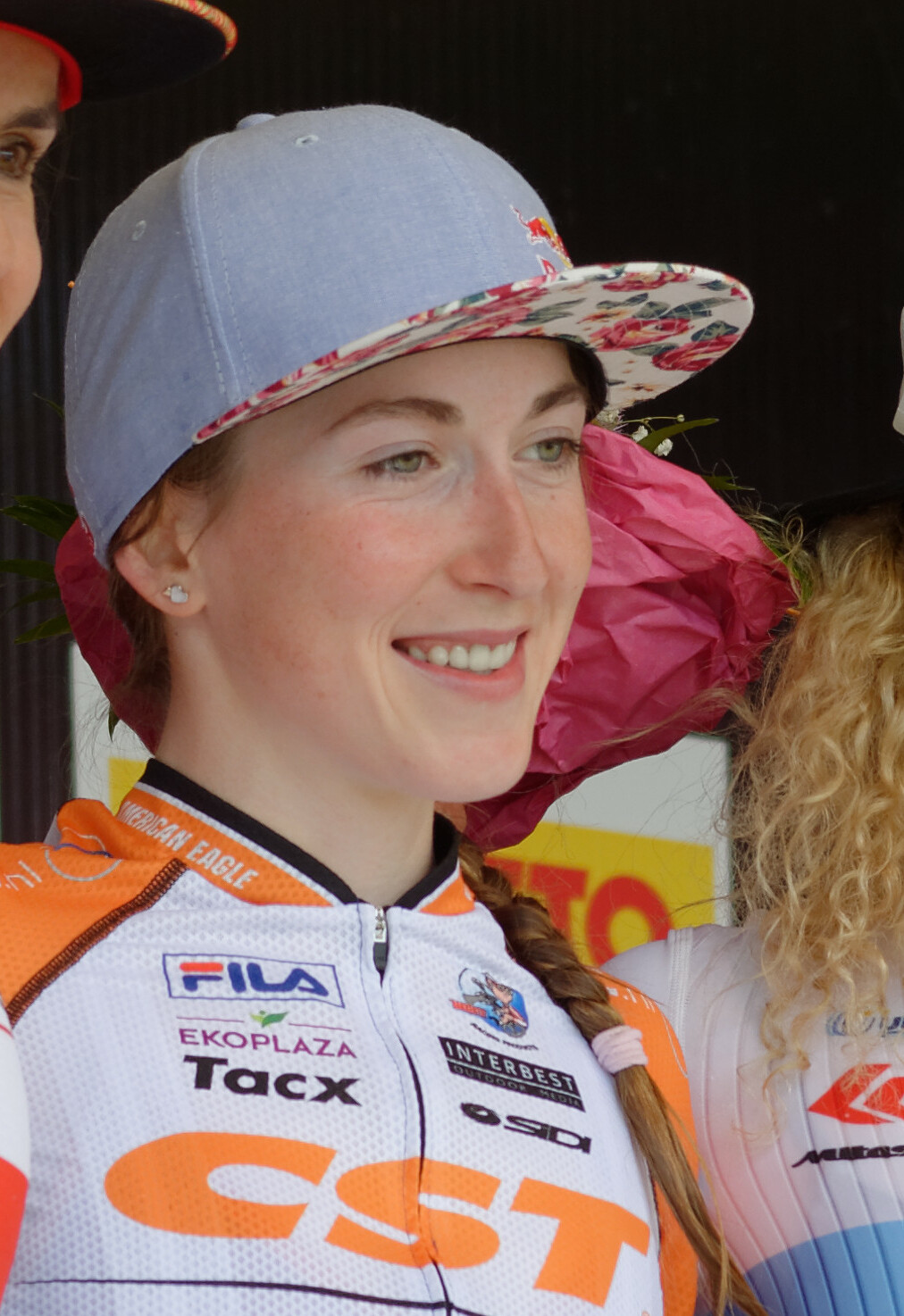
- Belomoina in 2017

Personal information
- Born: 2 November 1992 (age 33) Lutsk, Ukraine

Cycling career
- Sport: Cycling
- Discipline: Mountain bike racing
- Role: Rider
- Rider type: Cross-country
Medal record
Women's mountain bike racing
Representing Ukraine
World Championships
Silver medal – second place	2010 Mont-Sainte-Anne	Junior cross-country
Silver medal – second place	2012 Leogang-Saalfelden	U23 cross-country
Bronze medal – third place	2013 Pietermaritzburg	U23 cross-country
Bronze medal – third place	2015 Vallnord	Elite cross-country
European Championships
Gold medal – first place	2013 Bern	U23 cross-country
Gold medal – first place	2017 Darfo Boario Terme	Elite cross-country
Silver medal – second place	2019 Brno	Elite cross-country
Bronze medal – third place	2020 Monteceneri	Elite cross-country

Yana Belomoyna (Ukrainian: Яна Беломоіна, also transliterated Iana Belomoina, born 2 November 1992) is a Ukrainian cross-country mountain biker.

== Career ==
She held the UCI Cross-country Women's Elite #1 ranking in 2017. At the 2012 Summer Olympics, she competed in the Women's cross-country race at Hadleigh Farm, finishing 13th. She was the 2014 UCI Mountain Bike World Cup champion in the U23 category.

== Career achievements ==
=== Major results ===
2020
3rd European Mountain Bike Championships XCO
