= Filip Polc =

Slovak mountain biker

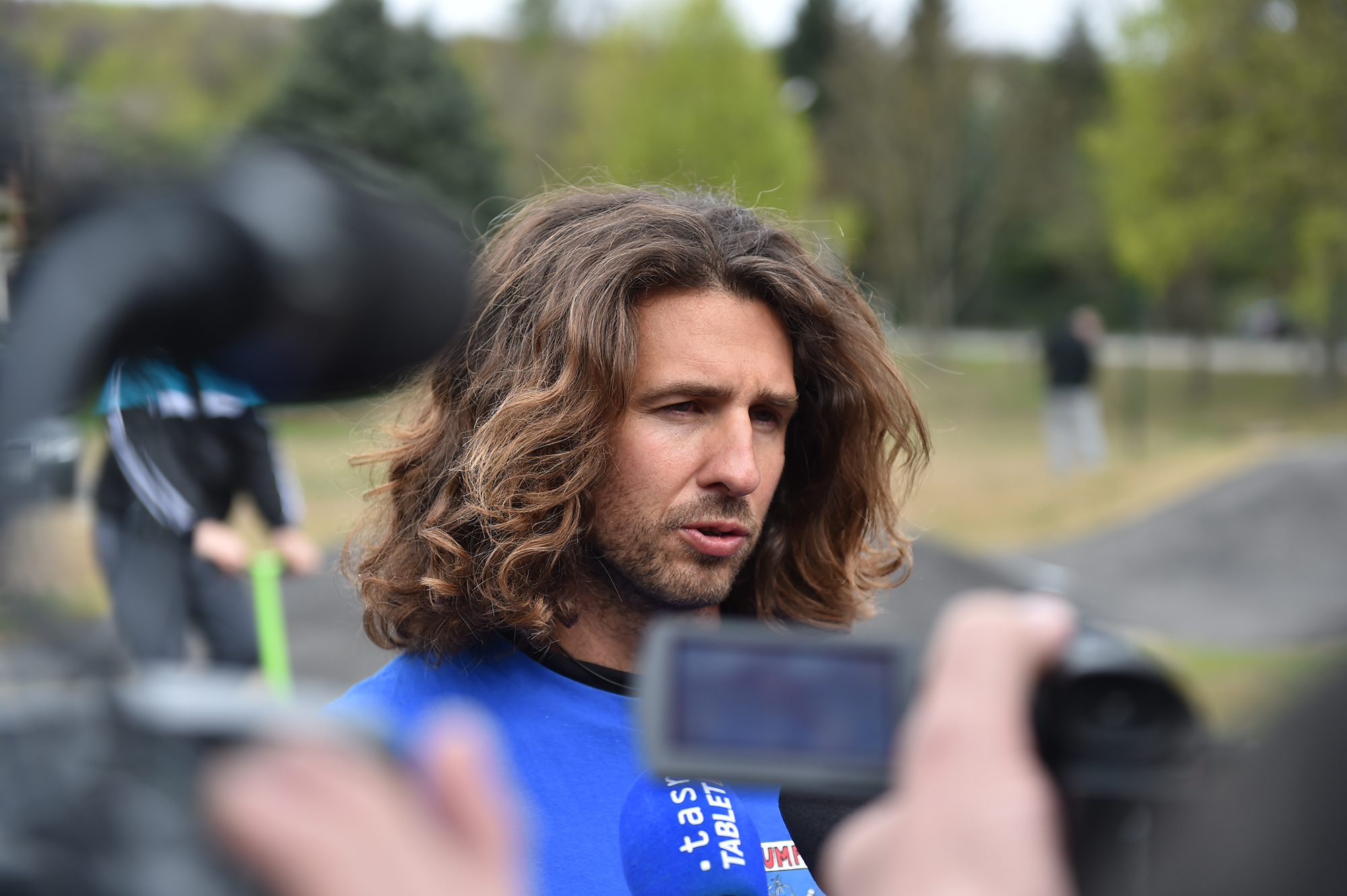

Personal information
- Born: 4 April 1982 (age 44) Bratislava, Czechoslovakia

Cycling career
- Sport: Cycling
- Discipline: Downhill
- Role: Rider

Filip Polc (born 4 April 1982) is a Slovak downhill mountain biker. He most notably won the European Downhill Championships in 2001. He was also the national downhill champion in 1998, 2004, 2005, 2006, 2007 and 2008. In 2001, he was designated the Slovak Cyclist of the Year.

== Major results ==
1997
1st National Dual-slalom Championships
3rd European Junior Downhill Championships
1998
1st National Downhill Championships
1st National Dual-slalom Championships
3rd European Junior Downhill Championships
1999
1st National Dual-slalom Championships
2001
1st European Downhill Championships
2004
1st National Downhill Championships
2005
1st National Downhill Championships
2006
1st National Downhill Championships
2007
1st National Downhill Championships
2008
1st National Downhill Championships
1st National Four-cross Championships
2010
1st Valparaíso Cerro Abajo
2011
1st Valparaíso Cerro Abajo
2014
1st Valparaíso Cerro Abajo
2015
1st Valparaíso Cerro Abajo
