= Fabian Giger =

Swiss mountain biker (born 1987)

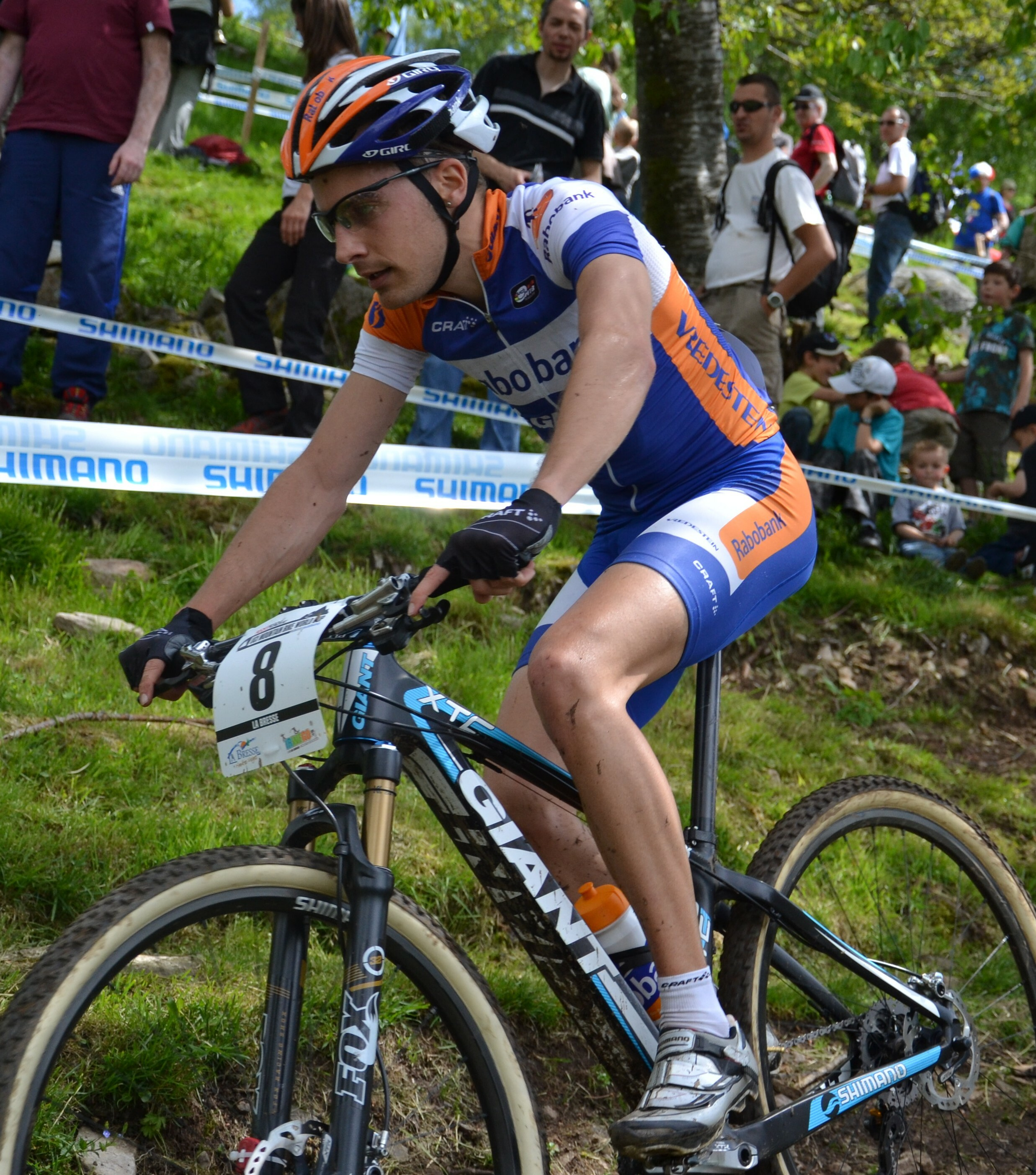
- Fabian Giger in 2012.

Personal information
- Born: 18 July 1987 (age 39) Rieden, Switzerland

Cycling career
- Sport: Cycling
- Current team: Kross Racing Team
- Disciplines: Mountain, Road
- Role: Rider

Professional teams
- 2008–2009: SKS–MIG
- 2010–2012: Rabobank–Giant Gross
- 2013–2014: Pro XC
- 2015: Colnago Südtirol
- 2016–: Kross Racing Team
Medal record
Representing Switzerland
Men's mountain bike racing
European Games
Bronze medal – third place	2015 Baku	Cross-country
European Championships
Gold medal – first place	2009	U23 Cross-country
Silver medal – second place	2014 Sankt Wendel	Cross-country
Silver medal – second place	2016 Huskvarna	Cross-country

Fabian Giger (born 18 July 1987) is a Swiss mountain bike racer.

Giger also rides on the road, finishing 3rd overall and winning the first stage of the 2017 Istrian Spring Trophy, as 2.2 event of the UCI Europe Tour.

== Major results ==
=== Road ===
2017
3rd Overall Istrian Spring Trophy

1st Stage 1
