= Helen Grobert =

German cyclist (born 1992)

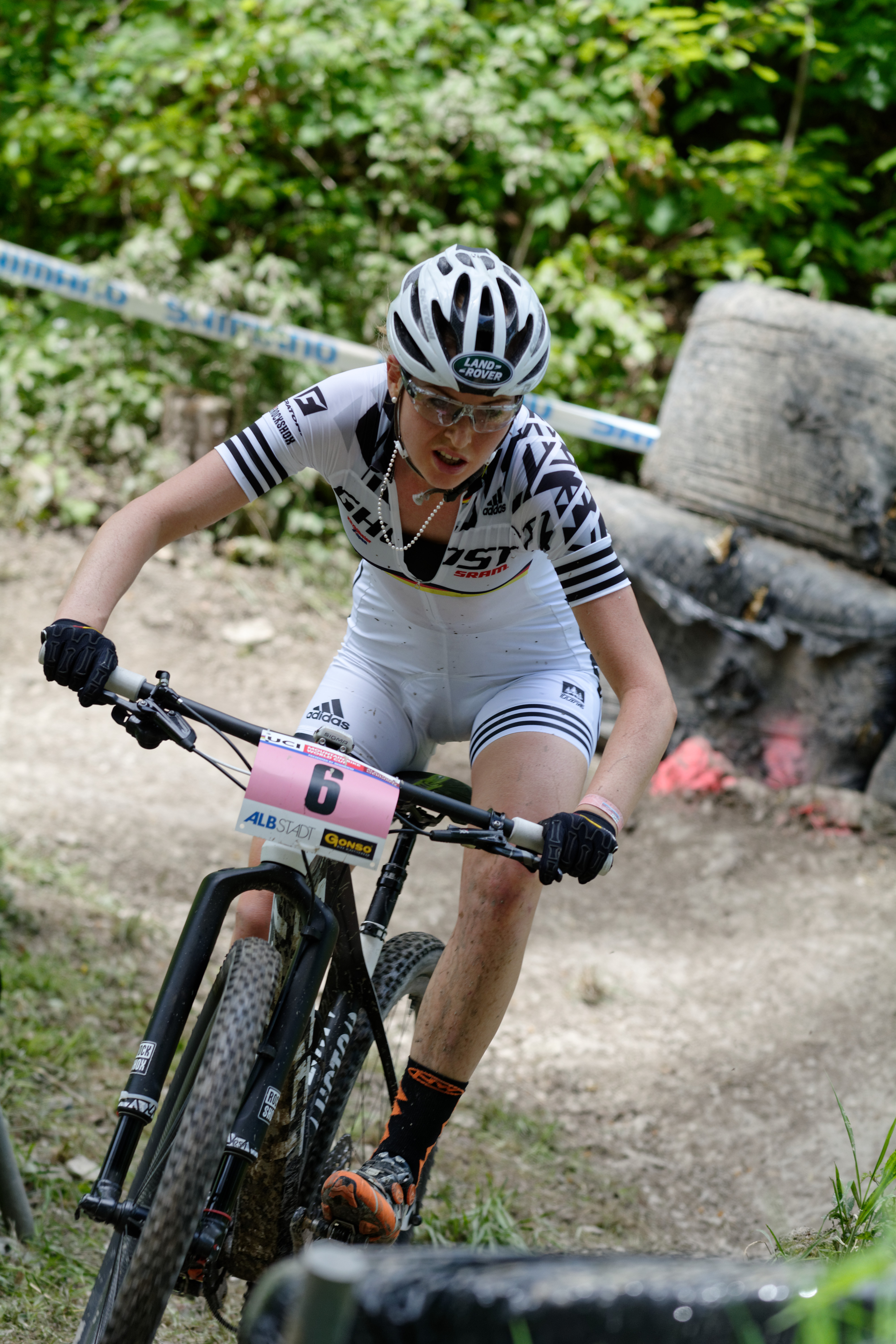

Personal information
- Born: 11 April 1992 (age 32); Filderstadt, Germany
- Height: 175 cm (5 ft 9 in)
- Weight: 58 kg (128 lb)

Helen Grobert (born 11 April 1992 in Filderstadt) is a German cross-country cyclist. She placed 12th in the women's cross-country race at the 2016 Summer Olympics.
