= Juri Zanotti =

Italian cyclist

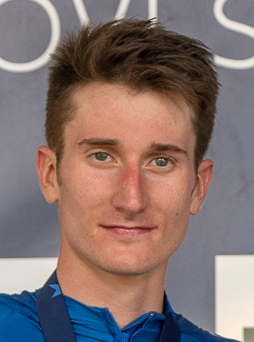
- Zanotti in 2021

Personal information
- Born: 5 January 1999 (age 27) Lecco, Italy

Cycling career
- Sport: Cycling
- Current team: BMC MTB Racing
- Discipline: Mountain bike
- Role: Rider

Amateur teams
- 2016–2017: Velo Club Monte Tamaro
- 2018–2019: Torpado Gabogas

Professional teams
- 2018–2019: Torpado Gabogas
- 2020–2021: KTM Protek Dama
- 2021: Bardiani–CSF–Faizanè (stagiaire)
- 2022–: BMC MTB Racing
Medal record
Representing Italy
World Championships
| Silver medal – second place | 2021 Val di Sole | Under-23 Cross country |
| Silver medal – second place | 2020 Leogang | Team relay |

Juri Zanotti (born 5 January 1999) is an Italian cross-country mountain biker.

== Major results ==
2016
3rd Cross-country, National Junior Championships
2017
1st Cross-country, National Junior Championships
3rd Team relay, UEC European Championships
2018
1st Cross-country, National Under-23 Championships
1st Team relay, UEC European Championships
2020
UEC European Championships

1st Team relay
3rd Under-23 Cross-country

2nd Team relay, UCI World Championships
2021
UEC European Championships

1st Team relay
2nd Under-23 Cross-country

1st Cross-country, National Under-23 Championships
UCI Under-23 XCO World Cup

2nd Lenzerheide
3rd Les Gets

2022
2nd Cross-country, National Championships
