= Olof Jonsson =

Olof Jonsson (1918-1998) was a Swedish-American engineer and psychic.

Olof Jonsson's 1st practical use of ESP was in October 1939 when he advised the captain of their merchant navy ship from sailing into a German minefield.

He was born in Malmö, Sweden. He later moved to Chicago where he worked as an engineer. In 1953, the parapsychologist J] tested him in a series of ESP experiments. B. Rhine at Duke University. He was caught cheating in the experiments.

Jonsson is most notable for his long-distance telepathy unofficial experiment on the return trip of the Apollo 14 mission in 1971. Four psychics on Earth were chosen to receive telepathic signals from a Zener deck of cards from astronaut Edgar Mitchell in space. The experiment was deemed a complete failure. based on the public press of the time. Other reports were more positive,

Astronaut Edgar Mitchell with team members Dr Karlis Osis and Dr. Rhine communicated in a preliminary analysis after the flight that the results would prove quite interesting.
