= Maria Östergren =

Swedish cyclist

Personal information
- Born: 9 April 1978 (age 48) Stockholm, Sweden

Cycling career
- Sport: Cycling

Maria Östergren (born 9 April 1978) is a Swedish cyclist. She competed in the women's cross-country mountain biking event at the 2004 Summer Olympics.
