= Peter Riis Andersen =

Danish cyclist

Personal information
- Born: 25 July 1980 (age 46)

Cycling career
- Sport: Cycling

Peter Riis Andersen (born 25 July 1980) is a Danish cyclist. He competed in the men's cross-country mountain biking event at the 2004 Summer Olympics.
