= Thomas Litscher =

Swiss mountain biker

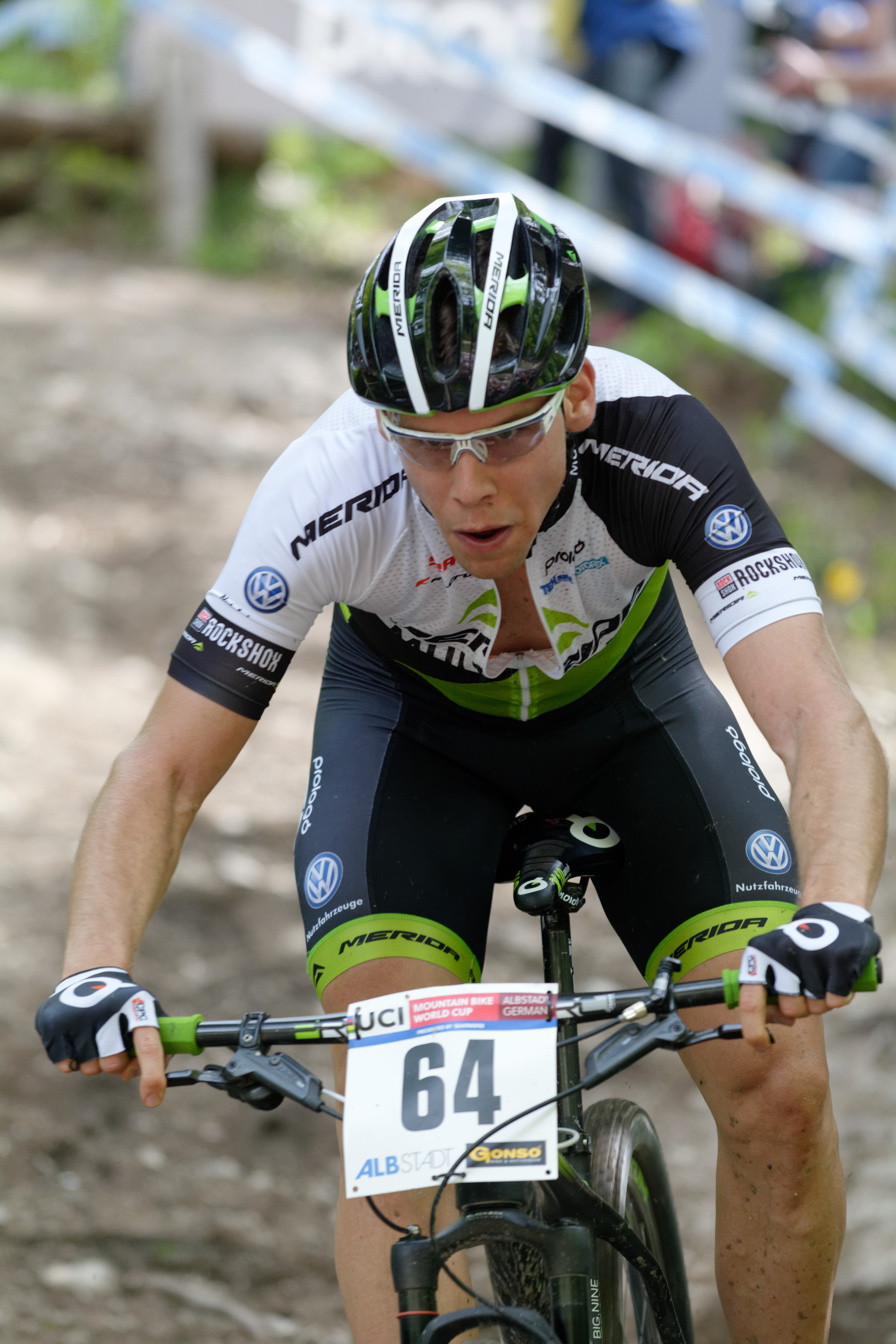
- Litscher at the 2016 UCI Mountain Bike World Cup

Personal information
- Full name: Thomas Litscher
- Born: 14 May 1989 (age 37)

Cycling career
- Sport: Cycling
- Current team: JB Brunex Felt Factory Team
- Discipline: Mountain bike racing
- Role: Rider
- Rider type: Cross-country
Medal record
Representing Switzerland
Men's mountain bike racing
World Championships
Gold medal – first place	2011 Champéry	Under-23 cross-country
Gold medal – first place	2007 Fort William	Junior cross-country
Gold medal – first place	2007 Fort William	Team relay
Gold medal – first place	2010 Mont Sainte-Anne	Team relay
Silver medal – second place	2010 Mont Sainte-Anne	Under-23 cross-country
Bronze medal – third place	2017 Cairns	Cross-country
Bronze medal – third place	2012 Canberra	Under-23 cross-country
Bronze medal – third place	2020 Leogang	Team relay
European Championships
Bronze medal – third place	2024 Cheile Grădiștei	Mixed relay

Thomas Litscher (born 14 May 1989) is a Swiss cross-country mountain biker.

== Major results ==
2007
UCI World Championships

1st Team relay
1st Junior Cross-country

UEC European Championships

1st Junior Cross-country
1st Team relay

2009
UEC European Championships

2nd Under-23 Cross-country
2nd Team relay

2010
UCI World Championships

1st Team relay
2nd Under-23 Cross-country

1st Team relay, UEC European Championships
2011
UCI World Championships

1st Under-23 Cross-country
2nd Team relay

UEC European Championships

2nd Team relay
3rd Under-23 Cross-country

2012
1st Eliminator, National Championships
3rd Cross-country, UCI World Under-23 Championships
2013
2nd Eliminator, National Championships
2014
3rd Eliminator, National Championships
2017
3rd Cross-country, UCI World Championships
2020
3rd Team relay, UCI World Championships
3rd Team relay, UEC European Championships
2022
UCI XCC World Cup

2nd Petrópolis

3rd Short track, UCI World Championships
2023
1st Short track, National Championships
XCC French Cup

2nd Guéret

UCI XCO World Cup

5th Mont-Sainte-Anne

2024
3rd Short track, National Championships
UCI XCC World Cup

3rd Nové Město
