= Chies d'Alpago =

- Comune
- Comune di Chies d'Alpago
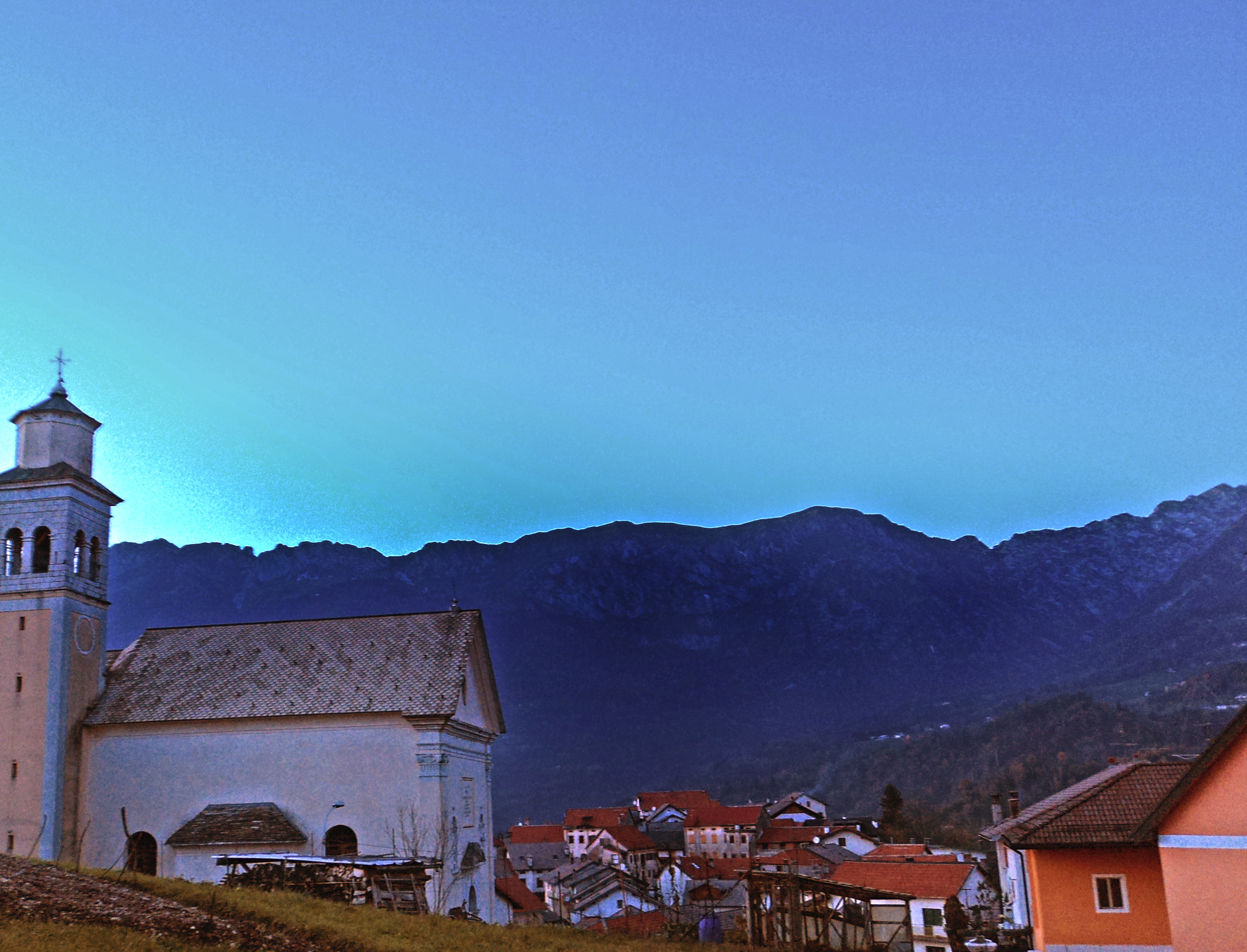

- Location within Italy Location within Veneto
- Coordinates: 46°10′N 12°24′E
- Country: Italy
- Region: Veneto
- Province: Province of Belluno (BL)

Government
  - Mayor: Gianluca Dal Borgo

Area
  - Total: 44.9 km^{2} (17.3 sq mi)
- Elevation: 647 m (2,123 ft)

Population (30 June 2017)
  - Total: 1,343
  - Density: 29.9/km^{2} (77.5/sq mi)
- Time zone: UTC+1 (CET)
  - Summer (DST): UTC+2 (CEST)
- Postal code: 32010
- Dialing code: 0437
- Website: Official website

Chies d'Alpago is a comune (municipality) in the Province of Belluno in the Italian region Veneto, located about 80 kilometres (50 mi) north of Venice and about 15 kilometres (9 mi) east of Belluno.

Chies d'Alpago borders the following municipalities: Barcis, Claut, Pieve d'Alpago, Puos d'Alpago, Tambre.
