= Tereza Huříková =

Czech road cyclist (born 1987)

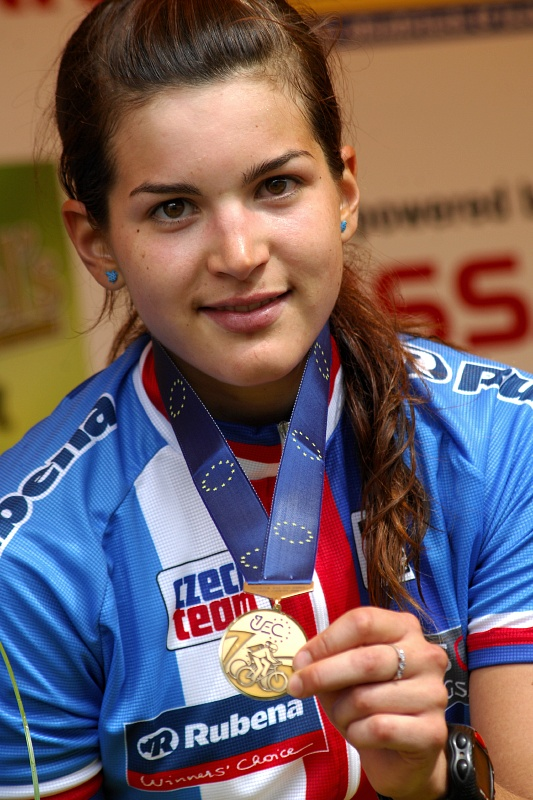

Personal information
- Full name: Tereza Huříková
- Born: 11 February 1987 (age 39) Vimperk, Czechoslovakia
- Height: 1.76 m (5 ft 9 1/2 in)
- Weight: 56 kg (123 lb)

Cycling career
- Sport: Cycling
- Current team: Central Haibike Pro Team
- Disciplines: Mountain biking, road
- Role: Rider
- Rider type: Cross-country, all-around

Professional teams
- 2006–2007: Česká Spořitelna MTB
- 2007–2008: USC Chirio Forno d'Asolo
- 2008–2009: Česká Spořitelna MTB
- 2010: Trek-Lorca Taller del Tiempo
- 2011–2012: Haibike Pro Team
- 2013–: Specialized Racing: XC MTB
Medal record
Women's road cycling
Representing Czech Republic
World Championships
Gold medal – first place	2004 Verona	Junior time trial
Silver medal – second place	2005 Salzburg	Junior time trial

Tereza Huříková (born 11 February 1987 in Vimperk) is a Czech professional road cyclist and mountain biker. Throughout her sporting career, she has won numerous Czech national championship titles in women's cross-country, road races and time trial, and more importantly, a prestigious gold medal in the junior time trial at the 2004 UCI World Championships. Huříková later represented the Czech Republic, as a 20-year-old junior, at the 2008 Summer Olympics, and also rode for USC Chirio Forno d'Asolo and Česká Spořitelna MTB Cycling Teams since she turned professional in 2006. Currently, Huříková trains and races under an exclusive, two-year sponsorship contract for Germany's Central Haibike Pro Team, along with her teammate and 2008 Olympic champion Sabine Spitz.

== Racing career ==
Before her professional sporting career, Huříková had sought global headlines, as a junior road rider and a member of the Czech cycling team, at the 2004 UCI World Championships in Verona, Italy, where she claimed her first and only gold medal in the women's time trial.

In 2006, Huříková turned her sights to and took up seriously as an elite athlete in mountain biking. She flourished her first career success at the Czech MTB National Championships, and later mounted top three finishes in the women's cross-country races at the European Championships, UCI World Cup, and Race Under The Sun Cup Series (Cyprus) in that same year. Strong results in cross-country mountain biking landed her a spot on the Česká Spořitelna MTB Team, followed by short, yet succeeding stints on Italy's USC Chirio Forno d'Asolo for a single season.

Huříková qualified for the Czech squad, as a lone female rider, in the women's cross-country race at the 2008 Summer Olympics in Beijing by receiving an automatic berth both from UCI and Czech Cycling Union, based on her best performance at the World Cup series and Mountain Biking World Rankings. Since the start of a 4.8-km cross-country course, Huříková immediately became the major casualty on the initial lap, as she had been collided with another cyclist and then suffered from a mild rib fracture by falling off into the treacherous, rocky course path. Because of a heavy fall at the very start, Huříková officially failed to complete the full distance of the course.

Shortly after the Olympics, Huříková left USC Chirio Forno d'Asolo on her second stint for her nation's Česká Spořitelna MTB Team. In 2009, she managed to restore from her disheartening Olympic stint by capturing two tournament titles each in women's road race and time trial at the joint Czech and Slovak Championships in Bánovce nad Bebravou, Slovakia, signifying her sudden return to road cycling. At the end of 2009 season, Huříková decided to join the Spanish mountain biking team Trek-Lorca Taller del Tiempo for the succeeding season, and was signed exclusively under a three-year contract. While competing for Team Trek-Lorca, she capped a successful 2010 season by delivering a sensational surprise bronze medal for her Czech squad in mixed relay at the European MTB Championships in Haifa, Israel.

At the start of the 2011 season, Huříková confirmedly joined with her teammate and 2008 Olympic champion Sabine Spitz for three seasons on Germany's Central Haibike Pro Team, as her short cycling stint with Team Trek-Lorca had been disbanded due to bankruptcy and lack of sponsorship.

== Career achievements ==
2004
(gold) UCI World Championships (ITT, Junior), Verona (ITA)
2005
(silver) UCI World Championships (ITT, Junior), Salzburg (AUT)
3rd Overall, Eko Tour Dookola Polski, Poland

1st Stage 3

8th UCI World Championships (Road, Junior), Salzburg (AUT)
2007
1st Czech Championships (ITT), Brno (CZE)
2nd Czech Championships (Cross-country race), Czech Republic
2nd Race Under the Sun (Cross-country race), Limassol (CYP)
3rd European Championships (Cross-country race, U23), Turkey
14th UCI World Championships (ITT), Stuttgart (GER)
2008
3rd European Championships (Cross-country race, U23), Sankt Wendel (GER)
2009
1st Czech and Slovak Championships (Road), Bánovce nad Bebravou (SVK)
1st Czech and Slovak Championships (ITT), Bánovce nad Bebravou (SVK)
2010
3rd Czech Championships (Cross-country race), Kuřim (CZE)
3rd European Championships (Cross-country race, Team relay), Haifa (ISR)
2012
1st Czech and Slovak Championships (Road), Czech Republic
2013
1st Czech and Slovak Championships (Road), Czech Republic
