= 2021 UCI Mountain Bike season =

2021 UCI MTB Season
Details
- Dates: 12 February – TBD
- Location: World
- Races: +200

The 2021 UCI MTB season was the sixteenth season of the Union Cycliste Internationale (UCI) MTB. The 2021 season began on 12 February with the Trek Israel Series no. 1 in Israel and ended in November 2021.

== Events ==
=== February ===
| Date | Race name | Location | UCI Rating | Winner | Second | Third | Ref |
|---|---|---|---|---|---|---|---|
| 12 February | Trek Israel Series no. 1 | Israel | XCO | Shlomi Haimy (ISR); Na'ama Noyman (ISR) | Eitan Levi (ISR); Lianne Witkin (ISR) | Gil-Li Gonen (ISR); Gali Weinberg (ISR) | |
| 13 February | Trek Israel Series no. 2 | Israel | XCO | Eitan Levi (ISR); Na'ama Noyman (ISR) | Shlomi Haimy (ISR); Lianne Witkin (ISR) | Yotam Deshe (ISR); Gali Weinberg (ISR) | |
| 13 February | Incekum – Velo Alanya MTB Cup | Turkey | XCO | Reto Indergand (SUI); Githa Michiels (BEL) | Antoine Philipp (FRA); Tereza Tvarůžková (CZE) | Mathis Azzaro (FRA); Emeline Detilleux (BEL) | |
| 14 February | Theodora – Velo Alanya MTB Cup | Turkey | XCO | Filippo Colombo (SUI); Githa Michiels (BEL) | Antoine Philipp (FRA); Emeline Detilleux (BEL) | Reto Indergand (SUI); Tereza Tvarůžková (CZE) | |
| 21 February | Alanya Elite Admiral Premium Residence MTB Cup | Turkey | XCO | Timofei Ivanov (RUS); Githa Michiels (BEL) | Jens Schuermans (BEL); Kristina Ilina (RUS) | Matej Ulik (SVK); Emeline Detilleux (BEL) | |
| 26 February | Alanya Banana MTB Cup | Turkey | XCO | Timofei Ivanov (RUS); Githa Michiels (BEL) | Reto Indergand (SUI); Barbara Benkó (HUN) | Antoine Philipp (FRA); Kristina Ilina (RUS) | |
| 27 February | Velo Alanya MTB Cup | Turkey | XCO | Timofei Ivanov (RUS); Githa Michiels (BEL) | Antoine Philipp (FRA); Karla Štěpánová (CZE) | Reto Indergand (SUI); Jana Czeczinkarová (CZE) | |
| 27–28 February | Coppa Citta' Di Albenga | Italy | XCO | Jordan Sarrou (FRA); Laura Stigger (AUT) | Gerhard Kerschbaumer (ITA); Sina Frei (SUI) | Mirko Tabacchi (ITA); Mona Mitterwallner (AUT) | |
| 27–28 February | Copa Catalana Internacional BTT | Spain | XCO | Victor Koretzky (FRA); Evie Richards (GBR) | Thomas Litscher (SUI); Jolanda Neff (SUI) | David Valero (ESP); Elisabeth Brandau (GER) | |
| 27–28 February | Alanya MTB Cup | Turkey | XCO | Antoine Philipp (FRA); Tereza Tvarůžková (CZE) | Reto Indergand (SUI); Githa Michiels (BEL) | David Nordemann (NED); Jana Czeczinkarová (CZE) | |

=== March ===
| Date | Race name | Location | UCI Rating | Winner | Second | Third | Ref |
|---|---|---|---|---|---|---|---|
| 6 March | SA XCO Cup Series | South Africa | XCO | Alan Hatherly (RSA); Candice Lill (RSA) | Philip Buys (RSA); Danielle Strydom (RSA) | Arno du Toit (RSA); Karla Stumpf (RSA) | |
| 7 March | Alanya Elite Luxury Suite Hotel Mtb Cup | Turkey | XCO | Timofei Ivanov (RUS); Ramona Forchini (SUI) | Dmytro Titarenko (UKR); Iryna Popova (UKR) | Oleksandr Koniaiev (UKR); Vera Medvedeva (RUS) | |
| 7 March | 1# Internazionali d'Italia Series – Andora Race Cup | Italy | XCO | Lars Forster (SUI); Jolanda Neff (SUI) | Victor Koretzky (FRA); Mona Mitterwallner (AUT) | Milan Vader (NED); Anne Terpstra (NED) | |
| 7 March | VTT Chabrieres | France | XCO | Hugo Drechou (FRA); Loana Lecomte (FRA) | Joshua Dubau (FRA); Juliette Trombini (FRA) | Loan Cheneval (FRA); Isaure Medde (FRA) | |
| 11 March | Karaburun MTB Cup | Turkey | XCO | Victor Koretzky (FRA); Tereza Tvarůžková (CZE) | Bartłomiej Wawak (POL); Barbara Benkó (HUN) | Dmytro Titarenko (UKR); Kristina Ilina (RUS) | |
| 12–13 March | Tennessee National | United States | DHI | Charlie Harrison (USA); Frida Helena Rønning (NOR) | Dakotah Norton (USA); Kailey Skelton (USA) | Steven Walton (USA); Mazie Hayden (USA) | |
| 13 March | Justiniano Hotel MTB Cup | Turkey | XCO | Victor Koretzky (FRA); Kristina Ilina (RUS) | Bartłomiej Wawak (POL); Barbara Benkó (HUN) | Timofei Ivanov (RUS); Ramona Forchini (SUI) | |
| 14 March | Alanya Avocado MTB Cup | Turkey | XCO | Victor Koretzky (FRA); Tereza Tvarůžková (CZE) | Bartłomiej Wawak (POL); Kristina Ilina (RUS) | Timofei Ivanov (RUS); Ramona Forchini (SUI) | |
| 14 March | Open España XCO – Gran Premio Ciudad De Valladolid De Btt | Spain | XCO | Vlad Dascălu (ROU); Loana Lecomte (FRA) | David Valero (ESP); Maja Włoszczowska (POL) | Jofre Cullell Estapé (ESP); Rocío García (ESP) | |
| 20–21 March | Fullgaz Race powered by Ghost int. MTB Bundesliga | Germany | XCC/XCO | Filippo Colombo (SUI) (XCC); Anne Terpstra (NED) (XCC); Sebastian Carstensen (DEN) (XCO); Caroline Bohé (DEN) (XCO) | Simon Andreassen (DEN) (XCC); Anne Tauber (NED) (XCC); Thomas Litscher (SUI) (XCO); Nicole Koller (SUI) (XCO) | Titouan Carod (FRA) (XCC); Linda Indergand (SUI) (XCC); Maximilian Brandl (GER) (XCO); Anne Tauber (NED) (XCO) | |
| 21 March | KTM Kamptal Trophy | Austria | XCO | Ondřej Cink (CZE); Mona Mitterwallner (AUT) | Krzysztof Łukasik (POL); Yana Belomoyna (UKR) | Bartłomiej Wawak (POL); Jitka Čábelická (CZE) | |
| 21 March | Alanya Kızılalan Davut Berber MTB Cup | Turkey | XCO | Oleksandr Koniaiev (UKR); Iryna Popova (UKR) | Denis Sergiyenko (KAZ); Alina Sarkulova (KAZ) | Maxim Gogolev (RUS); Iryna Slobodyan (UKR) | |
| 21 March | Tropical Mountain Bike Challenge | Puerto Rico | XCO | Gerardo Ulloa (MEX); Daniela Campuzano (MEX) | Martín Vidaurre Kossman (CHI); Savilia Blunk (USA) | Adair Zabdiel Gutiérrez Prieto (MEX); Sofía Gómez Villafañe (ARG) | |
| 25–28 March | Mediterranean Epic | Spain | XCM | Daniele Braidot (ITA); Ramona Forchini (SUI) | Luca Braidot (ITA); Chiara Teocchi (ITA) | Daniel Geismayr (AUT); Martina Berta (ITA) | |
| 27 March | SA XCO Cup Series | South Africa | XCO | Alan Hatherly (RSA); Candice Lill (RSA) | Wessel Botha (RSA); Sarah Hill (RSA) | Philip Buys (RSA); Danielle Strydom (RSA) | |
| 28 March | Superprestigio MTB | Spain | XCO | Francesc Barber Arguimbau (ESP); Maja Włoszczowska (POL) | Marc Masana (ESP); Julie Bresset (FRA) | Aniol Morell Coll (ESP); Rocío García (ESP) | |

=== April ===
| Date | Race name | Location | UCI Rating | Winner | Second | Third | Ref |
|---|---|---|---|---|---|---|---|
| 1 – 4 April | Volcat BTT | Spain | XCM | Nicola Rohrbach (SUI); Loana Lecomte (FRA) | Hans Becking (NED); Maja Włoszczowska (POL) | José Dias (POR); Kataržina Sosna (LTU) | |
| 3 April | Verona MTB International | Italy | XCO | Nadir Colledani (ITA); Yana Belomoyna (UKR) | Mirko Tabacchi (ITA); Giada Specia (ITA) | Stéphane Tempier (FRA); Jitka Čábelická (CZE) | |
| 4 April | Abierto Argentino XCO | Argentina | XCO | Catriel Soto (ARG); María Laura Bugarín (ARG) | Fernando Contreras (ARG); Pilar Adoué (ARG) | Álvaro Macías (ARG); Guadalupe Suárez Casaday (ARG) | |
| 5 April | 2# Internazionali d'Italia Series – Legend Cup XCO | Italy | XCO | Henrique Avancini (BRA); Kate Courtney (USA) | Nino Schurter (SUI); Chiara Teocchi (ITA) | Maxime Marotte (FRA); Caroline Bohé (DEN) | |
| 9 April | 1st International Shfaram XCO | Israel | XCO | Shlomi Haimy (ISR); Na'ama Noyman (ISR) | Yotam Deshe (ISR); Lianne Witkin (ISR) | Nadav Raisberg (ISR); Gali Weinberg (ISR) | |
| 9–10 April | Namibia XC 1 | Namibia | XCO | Tristan De Lange (NAM); Gabriela Raith (NAM) | Daniel Van Der Walt (RSA); Marion Schonecke (NAM) | Keagan Bontekoning (RSA); Irene Steyn (NAM) | |
| 10 April | Misgav International | Israel | XCO | Eitan Levi (ISR); Na'ama Noyman (ISR) | Shlomi Haimy (ISR); Lianne Witkin (ISR) | Yotam Deshe (ISR); Gali Weinberg (ISR) | |
| 10 April | 3# Internazionali d'Italia Series – Marlene Südtirol Sunshine Race | Italy | XCO | Mathias Flückiger (SUI); Loana Lecomte (FRA) | Nino Schurter (SUI); Pauline Ferrand-Prévot (FRA) | Maxime Marotte (FRA); Mona Mitterwallner (AUT) | |
| 10 April | Side Antik MTB Cup | Turkey | XCO | Oleksandr Koniaiev (UKR); Iryna Popova (UKR) | Abdülkadir Kelleci (TUR); Elena Gogoleva (RUS) | Maxim Gogolev (RUS); Maria Sherstiuk (UKR) | |
| 10–11 April | Downhill de São Brás de Alportel – Portugal Cup DHI | Portugal | DHI | Gonçalo Bandeira (POR); Margarida Bandeira (POR) | Tiago Ladeira (POR); Joana Nunes (POR) | Brett Wheeler (GBR); Marta Simões (POR) | |
| 10–11 April | Costa Rican Open Of Downhill | Costa Rica | DHI | Charlie Harrison (USA); Kailey Skelton (USA) | Dakotah Norton (USA); Riley Weidman (USA) | Pablo Aguilar Omodeo (CRC); Marcela Canet Láscarez (CRC) | |
| 11 April | Manavgat MTB Marathon Race | Turkey | XCM | Oleksandr Koniaiev (UKR); Iryna Popova (UKR) | Maxim Gogolev (RUS); Iryna Shymanska (UKR) | David Schöggl (AUT); Esra Kürkçü Akgönül (TUR) | |
| 11 April | OZ Trails Pro Cup p/b Experience Fayetteville | United States | XCO | Christopher Blevins (USA); Daniela Campuzano (MEX) | Keegan Swenson (USA); Erin Huck (USA) | Riley Amos (USA); Haley Batten (USA) | |
| 17 April | SA XCO Cup Series | South Africa | XCO | Matthew Beers (RSA); Candice Neethling (RSA) | Marco Joubert (RSA); Frances Janse van Rensburg (RSA) | Keagan Bontekoning (RSA); Tiffany Keep (RSA) | |
| 17–18 April | XCO de Melgaço | Portugal | XCO | Mário Costa (POR); Raquel Queirós (POR) | David Rosa (POR); Joana Monteiro (POR) | Roberto Ferreira (POR); Josefina Casadey (ARG) | |
| 17–18 April | Ötztaler Mountainbike Festival | Austria | XCO | Mathias Flückiger (SUI); Anne Terpstra (NED) | Nino Schurter (SUI); Anne Tauber (NED) | Ondřej Cink (CZE); Laura Stigger (AUT) | |
| 18 April | Copa Catalana Internacional BTT | Spain | XCO | Thomas Griot (FRA); Loana Lecomte (FRA) | David Valero (ESP); Julie Bresset (FRA) | Joshua Dubau (FRA); Janika Lõiv (EST) | |
| 18 April | OZ Trails Pro Cup p/b Experience Fayetteville | United States | XCO | Keegan Swenson (USA); Erin Huck (USA) | Léandre Bouchard (CAN); Sofia Gomez Villafañe (USA) | Luke Vrouwenvelder (USA); Alexis Skarda (USA) | |
| 18 April | Computer Mania Western Cape XCO | South Africa | XCO | Matthew Beers (RSA); Candice Neethling (RSA) | Philip Buys (RSA); Frances Janse van Rensburg (RSA) | Daniel van der Walt (RSA); Marzelle van der Merwe (RSA) | |
| 20–24 April | Mitas 4 Islands MTB Stage Race | Croatia | XCM | Jaroslav Kulhavý (CZE); Matouš Ulman (CZE); Ariane Lüthi (SUI); Irina Lützelschwab (SUI) | Hans Becking (NED); José Dias (POR); Costanza Fasolis (ITA); Claudia Peretti (ITA) | Martin Stošek (CZE); Andreas Seewald (GER); Rosa van Doorn (NED); Tessa Neefjes (NED) | |
| 23 April | Rosh Haayin XCO | Israel | XCO | Shlomi Haimy (ISR); Na'ama Noyman (ISR) | Eitan Levi (ISR); Lianne Witkin (ISR) | Tomer Zaltsman (ISR); Romi Vladnitski (ISR) | |
| 23 April | Best High Altitude MTB Cup | Turkey | XCO | Ivan Filatov (RUS); Iryna Popova (UKR) | Oleksandr Koniaiev (UKR); Vera Medvedeva (RUS) | Anton Albrecht (GER); Alina Sarkulova (KAZ) | |
| 25 April | MTB Ca'neva Trophy | Italy | XCO | Filippo Colombo (SUI); Léna Gérault (FRA) | Jordan Sarrou (FRA); Laura Stigger (AUT) | Alan Hatherly (RSA); Chiara Teocchi (ITA) | |
| 25 April | Lythrodontas MTB by Agios Mnason | Cyprus | XCO | Andreas Miltiadis (CYP); Ekaterina Kovalchuk (RUS) | Christos Philokyprou (CYP); Elina Sofokleous (CYP) | Konstantinos Pavlides (CYP); No more competitors | |
| 25 April | Superprestigio MTB | Spain | XCO | Thomas Griot (FRA); Rebecca McConnell (AUS) | David Valero Serrano (ESP); Julie Bresset (FRA) | Daniel McConnell (AUS); Maja Włoszczowska (POL) | |
| 27 April | Velo Erciyes MTB Cup | Turkey | XCO | Dmytro Titarenko (UKR); Iryna Popova (UKR) | Oleksandr Koniaiev (UKR); Aleksandra Ushakova (RUS) | Ivan Filatov (RUS); Vera Medvedeva (RUS) | |
| 30 April–1 May | SoHo Bike Fest | United States | XCC/XCO | Luke Vrouwenvelder (USA) (XCC); Rose Grant (USA) (XCC); Stephan Davoust (USA) (XCO); Alexis Skarda (USA) (XCO) | Stephan Davoust (USA) (XCC); Alexis Skarda (USA) (XCC); Bjorn Riley (USA) (XCO); Rose Grant (USA) (XCO) | Cobe Freeburn (USA) (XCC); Evelyn Dong (USA) (XCC); Luke Vrouwenvelder (USA) (XCO); Evelyn Dong (USA) (XCO) | |

=== May ===
| Date | Race name | Location | UCI Rating | Winner | Second | Third | Ref |
|---|---|---|---|---|---|---|---|
| 1 May | Mount Erciyes High Altitude MTB Cup | Turkey | XCO | Oleksandr Koniaiev (UKR); Iryna Popova (UKR) | Alessio Agostinelli (ITA); Aleksandra Ushakova (RUS) | Ivan Filatov (RUS); Alina Sarkulova (KAZ) | |
| 1 May | Copa Catalana Internacional BTT | Spain | XCO | Victor Koretzky (FRA); Rocío García (ESP) | Daan Soete (BEL); Rebecca McConnell (AUS) | Jens Schuermans (BEL); Isaure Medde (FRA) | |
| 1–2 May | Open España XCO Quebrantahuesos | Spain | XCO | Ismael Esteban Agüero (ESP); Meritxell Figueras Garangou (ESP) | Benjamin Le Ny (FRA); Lara Lois García (ESP) | David Domingo Campos (ESP); Áurea Ruiz García (ESP) | |
| 1–2 May | PROFFIX Swiss Bike Cup Leukerbad | Switzerland | XCO | Tom Pidcock (GBR); Mona Mitterwallner (AUT) | Titouan Carod (FRA); Kate Courtney (USA) | Sean Fincham (CAN); Pauline Ferrand-Prévot (FRA) | |
| 2 May | Slovak Cup | Slovakia | XCO | Jakub Zamroźniak (POL); Kata Blanka Vas (HUN) | Jan Zatloukal (CZE); Virág Buzsáki (HUN) | Jan Škarnitzl (CZE); Matylda Szczecińska (POL) | |
| 2 May | Portugal Cup XCO – Lousada | Portugal | XCO | Mário Costa (POR); Raquel Queirós (POR) | Pablo Rodríguez Guede (ESP); Joana Monteiro (POR) | José Dias (POR); Maaris Meier (EST) | |
| 2 May | Erciyes MTB Cup | Turkey | XCO | Alessio Agostinelli (ITA); Iryna Popova (UKR) | Oleksandr Koniaiev (UKR); Vera Medvedeva (RUS) | Axel Roudil Cortinat (FRA); Aleksandra Ushakova (RUS) | |
| 8 May | Albstadt | Germany | XCO | Finn Treudler (SUI); Line Burquier (FRA) | Oleksandr Hudyma (UKR); Monique Halter (SUI) | Nils Aebersold (SUI); Sina Van Thiel (GER) | |
| 9 May | Costa degli Etruschi | Italy | XCM | Héctor Leonardo Páez León (COL); Kataržina Sosna (LTU) | Diego Arias (COL); Sandra Mairhofer (ITA) | Tony Longo (ITA); Serena Calvetti (ITA) | |
| 15 May | Englewood Open | United States | XCO | Tobin Ortenblad (USA); Alexis Skarda (USA) | Carson Beckett (USA); Lauren Lackman (USA) | Luke Vrouwenvelder (USA); Paige Edwards (USA) | |
| 15 May | Nové Město na Moravě | Czech Republic | XCO | Finn Treudler (SUI); Lea Huber (SUI) | Nils Aebersold (SUI); Monique Halter (SUI) | Romano Püntener (LIE); Alexa Fuchs (GER) | |
| 15–16 May | Downhill De Boticas – Portugal Cup Dhi | Portugal | DHI | Amaury Pierron (FRA); Myriam Nicole (FRA) | Angel Suárez Alonso (ESP); Telma Torregrosa (ESP) | Thibaut Dapréla (FRA); Agnès Delest (FRA) | |
| 17–22 May | UCI MTB MARATHON SERIES – Andalucía Bike Race | Spain | XCM | Urs Huber (SUI); Simon Schneller (GER); Kataržina Sosna (LTU); Stefanie Dohrn (GER) | José Silva (POR); Hans Becking (NED); Hildegunn Gjertrud Hovdenak (NOR); Janine Schneider (GER) | Simon Stiebjahn (GER); Martin Frey (GER); Irina Lützelschwab (SUI); Jennie Stenerhag (SWE) | |
| 22 May | SA XCO Cup Series | South Africa | XCO | Matthew Beers (RSA); Mariske Strauss (RSA) | Johann van Zyl (RSA); Zandri Strydom (RSA) | Arno du Toit (RSA); Kimberley Le Court (MRI) | |
| 22 May | Izomat MTB Cup 2021 | Czech Republic | XCO | Georg Egger (GER); Kata Blanka Vas (HUN) | Jan Škarnitzl (CZE); Daniela Campuzano (MEX) | Karl Markt (AUT); Jitka Čábelická (CZE) | |
| 22–23 May | Portugal Cup XCO – Internacional XCO Marrazes | Portugal | XCO | Mário Costa (POR); Ana Santos (POR) | David Rosa (POR); Raquel Queirós (POR) | Iván Feijoo Alberte (ESP); Joana Monteiro (POR) | |
| 23 May | Polish MTB Cup – Rusza Peleton | Poland | XCO | Krzysztof Łukasik (POL); Klaudia Czabok (POL) | Filip Helta (POL); Gabriela Wojtyła (POL) | Karol Ostaszewski (POL); Aleksandra Podgórska (POL) | |
| 23 May | Superprestigio MTB | Spain | XCO | Sergio Mantecón Gutiérrez (ESP); Rebecca McConnell (AUS) | Daniel McConnell (AUS); Meritxell Figueras Garangou (ESP) | Ismael Esteban Agüero (ESP); Amélie Laquebe (FRA) | |
| 23 May | Attica MTB XCO Race | Greece | XCO | — | — | — | |
| 29 May | Mackay Cup – Round 1 | Australia | XCO | Sam Fox (AUS); Zoe Cuthbert (AUS) | Cameron Ivory (AUS); Isabella Flint (AUS) | Sam Shaw (NZL); Holly Lubcke (AUS) | |
| 29 May | Izomat MTB Cup 2021 – Brno CZ | Czech Republic | XCO | Ondřej Cink (CZE); Janika Lõiv (EST) | Martín Vidaurre (CHI); Jitka Čábelická (CZE) | Jan Vastl (CZE); Adéla Holubová (CZE) | |
| 29–30 May | Cerrano Bike Land | Italy | XCO | Gioele Bertolini (ITA); Eva Lechner (ITA) | Juri Zanotti (ITA); Giada Specia (ITA) | Mirko Tabacchi (ITA); Francesca Saccu (ITA) | |
| 29 May–1 June | Club La Santa 4 Stage MTB Lanzarote | Spain | XCM | Sören Nissen (LUX); Ann-Dorthe Lisbygd (DEN) | Víctor Manuel Fernández (ESP); Manuela Mureșan (ROU) | Óscar Carrasco (ESP); Naima Diesner (GER) | |
| 30 May | XCO Kocevje | Slovenia | XCO | Mario Bair (AUT); Yana Belomoyna (UKR) | Daniele Braidot (ITA); Marika Tovo (ITA) | Rok Naglič (SVN); Giorgia Marchet (ITA) | |
| 30 May | Turieckap – Slovak Cup | Slovakia | XCO | Martin Haring (SVK); Janika Lõiv (EST) | Filip Helta (POL); Katarzyna Solus-Miśkowicz (POL) | Jan Škarnitzl (CZE); Barbara Benkó (HUN) | |
| 30 May | Mackay Cup – Round 2 | Australia | XCO | Cameron Ivory (AUS); Zoe Cuthbert (AUS) | Sam Fox (AUS); Holly Lubcke (AUS) | Sam Shaw (NZL); Isabella Flint (AUS) | |
| 30 May | Bike Víkend MTB | Czech Republic | XCO | Martín Vidaurre (CHI); Adéla Holubová (CZE) | Jan Rajchart (CZE); Jana Czeczinkarová (CZE) | Sebastián Miranda Maldonado (CHI); Eva Wagner (GER) | |

=== June ===
| Date | Race name | Location | UCI Rating | Winner | Second | Third | Ref |
|---|---|---|---|---|---|---|---|
| 2 June | 4# Internazionali d'Italia Series – Valle di Casies Trophy | Italy | XCO | Gerhard Kerschbaumer (ITA); Catharine Pendrel (CAN) | Simone Avondetto (ITA); Sandra Walter (CAN) | Martín Vidaurre (CHI); Chiara Teocchi (ITA) | |
| 4–5 June | MTB French Cup Powered By SKF – XCO/XCC | France | XCO/XCC | Titouan Carod (FRA) (XCC); Léna Gérault (FRA) (XCC); Joshua Dubau (FRA) (XCO); Léna Gérault (FRA) (XCO) | Jordan Sarrou (FRA) (XCC); Hélène Clauzel (FRA) (XCC); Maxime Marotte (FRA) (XCO); Sofie Pedersen (DEN) (XCO) | Joshua Dubau (FRA) (XCC); Haley Smith (CAN) (XCC); Peter Disera (CAN) (XCO); Hélène Clauzel (FRA) (XCO) | |
| 4–6 June | Lillehammer MTB Weekend | Norway | XCO | Mats Tubaas Glende (NOR); Elisabeth Sveum (NOR) | Erik Hægstad (NOR); Ingrid Bøe Jacobsen (NOR) | Ole Sigurd Rekdahl (NOR); Sigrid Andrea Fløgstad (NOR) | |
| 5 June | Nova cup Skoda Auto Dolní Morava | Czech Republic | XCM | Filip Adel (CZE); Kateřina Nash (CZE) | Alexander Stadler (AUT); Nikol Flašarová (CZE) | Michal Kaněra (CZE); Andrea Maťhová (CZE) | |
| 6 June | Gran Premio Internacional Candeleda – Gredos | Spain | XCO | Daniel McConnell (AUS); Rebecca McConnell (AUS) | Jofre Cullell Estapé (ESP); Ana Santos (POR) | Ismael Esteban Agüero (ESP); Meritxell Figueras Garangou (ESP) | |
| 6 June | Górale na Start | Poland | XCO | Ondřej Cink (CZE); Katarzyna Solus-Miśkowicz (POL) | Bartłomiej Wawak (POL); Matylda Szczecińska (POL) | Filip Helta (POL); Klaudia Czabok (POL) | |
| 6 June | MTB French Cup Powered By SKF – XCO | France | XCO | Jordan Sarrou (FRA); Léna Gérault (FRA) | Thomas Griot (FRA); Malene Degn (DEN) | Joshua Dubau (FRA); Sofie Pedersen (DEN) | |
| 6 June | Kozara Grand Prix 2021 | Bosnia and Herzegovina | XCO | Dimitrios Antoniadis (GRE); Jovana Crnogorac (SRB) | Balázs Sylvester (HUN); Aikaterini Eleftheriadou (GRE) | Goran Cerović (MNE); Jana Jolović (SRB) | |
| 6 June | Grazer Bike-Opening Stattegg | Austria | XCO | Sebastian Carstensen (DEN); Mona Mitterwallner (AUT) | Gregor Raggl (AUT); Yana Belomoyna (UKR) | Maximilian Foidl (AUT); Anne Tauber (NED) | |
| 11–12 June | Missoula | United States | XCC/XCO | Cole Paton (USA) (XCC); Chloe Woodruff (USA) (XCC); Cole Paton (USA) (XCO); Chloe Woodruff (USA) (XCO) | Tobin Ortenblad (USA) (XCC); Rose Grant (USA) (XCC); Robbie Day (USA) (XCO); Alexis Skarda (USA) (XCO) | Luke Vrouwenvelder (USA); Hannah Finchamp (USA) (XCC); Luke Vrouwenvelder (USA); Rose Grant (USA) (XCO) | |
| 12 June | UCI MTB MARATHON SERIES – Hero Südtirol Dolomites – XCM | Italy | XCM | Andreas Seewald (GER); Kataržina Sosna (LTU) | Samuele Porro (ITA); Ariane Lüthi (SUI) | Héctor Leonardo Páez (COL); Angelika Tazreiter (AUT) | |
| 13 June | Copa Catalana Internacional BTT – Cala Ratjada | Spain | XCO | Cristofer Bosque Ruano (ESP); Meritxell Figueras Garangou (ESP) | Alberto Mingorance (ESP); Aúrea Ruiz García (ESP) | David Campos Motos (ESP); Lucía Macho (ESP) | |
| 13 June | MTB liga #1 | Denmark | XCO | Jonas Lindberg (DEN); Sofie Pedersen (DEN) | Victor Philipsen (DEN); Kirstine Holt (DEN) | Niels Bech Rasmussen (DEN); Ann-Dorthe Lisbygd (DEN) | |
| 16–20 June | Crankworx Innsbruck Downhill | Austria | DHI | Loris Vergier (FRA); Valentina Höll (AUT) | Troy Brosnan (AUS); Nina Hoffmann (GER) | Finn Iles (CAN); Tahnée Seagrave (GBR) | |
| 19 June | SA XCO Cup Series | South Africa | XCO | Philip Buys (RSA); Sarah Hill (RSA) | Matthew Beers (RSA); Danielle Strydom (RSA) | Jan Withaar (RSA); Kimberley Le Court (MRI) | |
| 19 June | Watersley Sports and Talent Park | Netherlands | XCO | Samuel Gaze (NZL); Mariske Strauss (RSA) | Tom Van Ingelgom (BEL); Lotte Koopmans (NED) | Jarne Vandersteen (BEL); Puck Pieterse (NED) | |
| 19–20 June | iXS Downhill Cup Pamporovo | Bulgaria | DHI | Thomas Guibal (FRA); Izabela Yankova (BUL) | Ian Guionnet (FRA); Viktoria Goncheva (BUL) | Athanasios Panagitsas (GRE); Carola Lucrezia Favoino (ITA) | |
| 19–20 June | PROFFIX Swiss Bike Cup Gränichen | Switzerland | XCO | Anton Cooper (NZL); Evie Richards (GBR) | Andri Frischknecht (SUI); Sina Frei (SUI) | Lars Forster (SUI); Linda Indergand (SUI) | |
| 20 June | XCO Samobor | Croatia | XCO | Alessio Agostinelli (ITA); Gwendalyn Gibson (USA) | András Parti (HUN); Tanja Žakelj (SVN) | Rok Naglič (SVN); Marianne Théberge (CAN) | |
| 20 June | Copa Catalana Internacional BTT | Spain | XCO | Didac Carvacho Sevilla (ESP); Sara Gay (ESP) | Cristofer Bosque Ruano (ESP); Noemí Moreno Castañeda (ESP) | Hugo Drechou (FRA); Laura Terradas Ill (ESP) | |
| 21–26 June | ENDURO WORLD SERIES – Canazei – EWS 1 | Italy | END | Richard Rude Jr. (USA); Isabeau Courdurier (FRA) | Jack Moir (AUS); Morgane Charre (FRA) | Jesse Melamed (CAN); Mélanie Pugin (FRA) | |
| 23–27 June | ENDURO WORLD SERIES – Canazei – EWS 2 | Italy | END | Jack Moir (AUS); Mélanie Pugin (FRA) | Richard Rude Jr. (USA); Morgane Charre (FRA) | Charlie Murray (NZL); Harriet Harnden (GBR) | |
| 25–27 June | MTB French Cup Powered By SKF- XCO/XCE | France | XCO/XCE | Victor Koretzky (FRA) (XCO); Loana Lecomte (FRA) (XCO); Lorenzo Serres (FRA) (XCE); Noémie Garnier (FRA) (XCE) | Jordan Sarrou (FRA) (XCO); Pauline Ferrand-Prévot (FRA) (XCO); Titouan Perrin-Ganier (FRA) (XCE); Isaure Medde (FRA) (XCE) | Antoine Philipp (FRA) (XCO); Mona Mitterwallner (AUT); Quentin Schrotzenberger (FRA) (XCE); Amélie Vazeille (FRA) (XCE) | |
| 25–27 June | IXS European Downhill Cup | Austria | DHI | Noel Niederberger (SUI); Gloria Scarsi (ITA) | Davide Palazzari (ITA); Izabela Yankova (BUL) | Ronan Dunne (IRL); Alia Marcellini (ITA) | |
| 26 June | Adelaide C2 | Australia | XCO | Cameron Ivory (AUS); Zoe Cuthbert (AUS) | Domenic Paolilli (AUS); Holly Lubcke (AUS) | Brendon Davids (RSA); Talia Simpson (AUS) | |
| 26 June | Izomat MTB Cup 2021 – Bedrichov CZ | Czech Republic | XCO | Bartłomiej Wawak (POL); Jitka Čábelická (CZE) | Jan Vastl (CZE); Karla Štěpánová (CZE) | Matej Ulík (SVK); Matylda Szczecińska (POL) | |
| 26 June | Bike Maraton Drásal České spořitelny | Czech Republic | XCM | Andreas Seewald (GER); Lejla Tanović (BIH) | Jaroslav Kulhavý (CZE); Nikol Flašarová (CZE) | Marek Rauchfuss (CZE); Janelle Uibokand (EST) | |
| 26–27 June | MTB French Cup Powered By SKF – DHI | France | DHI | Benoît Coulanges (FRA); Marine Cabirou (FRA) | Antoine Pierron (FRA); Mathilde Bernard (FRA) | Baptiste Pierron (FRA); Lauryne Chappaz (FRA) | |
| 26–27 June | 5# Internazionali d'Italia Series – La Thuile | Italy | XCO | Vlad Dascălu (ROU); Evie Richards (GBR) | Anton Sintsov (RUS); Rebecca McConnell (AUS) | Stéphane Tempier (FRA); Haley Batten (USA) | |
| 26–27 June | PROFFIX Swiss Bike Cup Savognin | Switzerland | XCO | Lars Forster (SUI); Kate Courtney (USA) | Albin Vital (SUI); Alessandra Keller (SUI) | Andri Frischknecht (SUI); Yana Belomoyna (UKR) | |
| 27 June | Superprestigio MTB | Spain | XCO | Ismael Esteban Agüero (ESP); Rocío García Martínez (ESP) | Pablo Rodríguez Guede (ESP); Natalia Fischer Egusquiza (ESP) | Cristofer Bosque Ruano (ESP); Meritxell Figueras Garangou (ESP) | |
| 30 June–3 July | Andorra MTB Classic | Andorra | XCO | Martin Frey (GER); Simon Schneller (GER); Sandra Mairhofer (ITA); Costanza Fasolis (ITA) | Jakub Zamroźniak (POL); Krzysztof Łukasik (POL); Greete Steinburg (EST); Alice Pirard (BEL) | Johnny Cattaneo (ITA); Martino Tronconi (ITA); Ariane Lüthi (SUI); Sandra Jordà (ESP) | |

=== July ===
| Date | Race name | Location | UCI Rating | Winner | Second | Third | Ref |
|---|---|---|---|---|---|---|---|
| 1–4 July | Jahorina Olympic Center Grand Prix II | Bosnia and Herzegovina | XCM | — | — | — | |
| 2–6 July | Kupkolo Mtbtrilogy Broumovsko | Czech Republic | XCM | Filip Adel (CZE); Katrin Schwing (GER) | Marek Rauchfuss (CZE); Sara Michielsens (BEL) | Tomáš Višňovský (SVK); Lenka Fridrichová (CZE) | |
| 4 July | Restart | Hungary | XCO | Volodymyr Kozlovskyy (UKR); Larisa Bošnjak (CRO) | Attila Gerely (HUN); Lena Höller (AUT) | Răzvan-Dan Grec (ROU); Kata Emma Kiss (HUN) | |
| 4 July | Argovia Vittoria-Fischer Bike Cup Lostorf | Switzerland | XCO | Joris Ryf (SUI); Fabienne Schauss (LUX) | Ian Millennium (DEN); Romana Carfora (NED) | Nick Bürki (SUI); Fiona Eichenberger (SUI) | |
| 8 July | ENDURO WORLD SERIES – La Thuile – EWS 1 and EWS 2 | Italy | END | Richard Rude Jr. (USA); Mélanie Pugin (FRA) | Jack Moir (AUS); Harriet Harnden (GBR) | Adrien Dailly (FRA); Andréane Lanthier Nadeau (CAN) | |
| 10 July | ENDURO WORLD SERIES – La Thuile – EWS 1 and EWS 2 | Italy | END | Richard Rude Jr. (USA); Andréane Lanthier Nadeau (CAN) | Jack Moir (AUS); Noga Korem (ISR) | Zakarias Johansen (SWE); Mélanie Pugin (FRA) | |
| 9–10 July | 4X Pro Tour – 4X Bike Madness 2021 | Czech Republic | 4X | Tomáš Slavík (CZE) | Mikuláš Nevrkla (CZE) | Martin Brza (CZE) | |
| 10 July | 26. Südtirol Dolomiti Superbike – XCM | Italy | XCM | Héctor Leonardo Páez (COL); Ariane Lüthi (SUI) | Martin Stošek (CZE); Annabella Stropparo (ITA) | Diego Arias (COL); Kataržina Sosna (LTU) | |
| 10 July | St. Félicien Canada Cup XCO | Canada | XCO | Léandre Bouchard (CAN); Maghalie Rochette (CAN) | Tyler Orschel (CAN); Cindy Montambault (CAN) | Marc-André Fortier (CAN); Juliette Larose-Gingras (CAN) | |
| 11 July | 3 Nations Cup – Riderz | Netherlands | XCO | Milan Vader (NED); Puck Pieterse (NED) | Pierre de Froidmont (BEL); Lotte Koopmans (NED) | Jens Adams (BEL); Denise Betsema (NED) | |
| 11 July | Weissenfelser MTB Event XCO | Germany | XCO | Niklas Schehl (GER); Emma Blömeke (GER) | Leon Kaiser (GER); Kira Böhm (GER) | Luis Neff (GER); Evelyn Behre (GER) | |
| 11 July | M Enterijer Gradnja Cup – 7th Crna Trava Trophy | Serbia | XCO | Martin Haring (SVK); Jovana Crnogorac (SRB) | Rok Naglič (SVN); Maruša Knap (SVN) | Daniel van der Walt (RSA); Ivana Kostić (SRB) | |
| 11 July | Copa Juvenil Mezuena | Colombia | XCO | Jose Stiven Quintero (COL); Angie Milena Lara (COL) | Jhonnatan Botero Villegas (COL); Ana María Roa (COL) | Hilvar Malaver (COL); Natalia Andréa Duarte (COL) | |
| 11 July | Orlen Małopolska Myślenice MTB XCO UCI C2 Race | Poland | XCO | Bartłomiej Wawak (POL); Matylda Szczecińska (POL) | Jakub Zamroźniak (POL); Jana Czeczinkarová (CZE) | Krzysztof Łukasik (POL); Klaudia Czabok (POL) | |
| 13 July | Internacional Estrada Real – XCO | Brazil | XCO | Henrique Avancini (BRA); Letícia Cândido (BRA) | Ulan Bastos (BRA); Karen Olímpio (BRA) | José Gabriel (BRA); Isabella Lacerda (BRA) | |
| 16–17 July | 4X Pro Tour – JBC 4X Revelations 2021 | Czech Republic | 4X | Tomáš Slavík (CZE) | Adrien Loron (FRA) | Petr Pála (CZE) | |
| 16–18 July | IXS Downhill Cup 2021 | Austria | DHI | Henry Kerr (IRL); Justine Welzel (GER) | Felix Bauer (GER); Marlena Neißl (AUT) | Timo Pries (GER); Jana Urban (GER) | |
| 17 July | MB Race – XCM | France | XCM | Urs Huber (SUI) | Juri Ragnoli (ITA) | Axel Roudil Cortinat (FRA) | |
| 17 July | Kolo pro život: Trans Brdy s 211 | Czech Republic | XCM | Martin Stošek (CZE); Kateřina Drhová (CZE) | Marek Rauchfuss (CZE); Hana Podracká (CZE) | Matouš Ulman (CZE); Lenka Fridrichová (CZE) | |
| 17 July | Sherbrooke Canada Cup XCO | Canada | XCO | Gunnar Holmgren (CAN); Maghalie Rochette (CAN) | Quinton Disera (CAN); Laurie Arseneault (CAN) | Tyler Orschel (USA); Cindy Montambault (CAN) | |
| 17–18 July | Fernie Canada Cup | Canada | DHI | Kirk McDowall (CAN); Rachel Pageau (CAN) | Jackson Frew (AUS); Claire Buchar (CAN) | Forrest Riesco (CAN); Jennifer McHugh (CAN) | |
| 18 July | Masovia Cup | Poland | XCO | Krzysztof Łukasik (POL); Klaudia Czabok (POL) | Karol Ostaszewski (POL); Matylda Szczecińska (POL) | Filip Helta (POL); Aleksandra Podgórska (POL) | |
| 18 July | 3 Nations Cup – GP Stad Beringen | Belgium | XCO | Daan Soete (BEL); Lotte Koopmans (NED) | Pierre de Froidmont (BEL); Puck Pieterse (NED) | David Nordemann (NED); Emeline Detilleux (BEL) | |
| 19–23 July | Transmaurienne Vanoise | France | XCS | Jens Adams (BEL); Estelle Morel (FRA) | Hans Becking (NED); Emily Johnston (CAN) | Benjamin Le Ny (FRA); Ilona Chavaillaz (SUI) | |
| 21 July | Panorama Canada Cup | Canada | DHI | Kirk McDowall (CAN); Ainhoa Ijurko (ESP) | Jackson Goldstone (CAN); Claire Buchar (CAN) | Wei Tien Ho (CAN); Jennifer McHugh (CAN) | |
| 23–25 July | iXS European Downhill Cup – Pila Ao | Italy | DHI | Tuhoto-Ariki Pene (NZL); Veronika Widmann (ITA) | Matt Walker (GBR); Izabela Yankova (BUL) | Luke Meier-Smith (AUS); Alia Marcellini (ITA) | |
| 24 July | Attica MTB XCO Race | Greece | XCO | | | | |
| 24–25 July | Borovets Open Cup | Bulgaria | DHI | Hannes Alber (ITA) | Alexandros Topkaroglou (GRE) | Ian Guionnet (FRA) | |
| 25 July | Taça Brasil de Cross-Country | Brazil | XCO | Ulan Bastos Galinski (BRA); Isabella Lacerda (BRA) | Sherman Trezza de Paiva (BRA); Karen Fernandes (BRA) | José Gabriel Marques (BRA); Hercilia Njara (BRA) | |
| 25 July | 3 Nations Cup – OP Fietse MTB | Netherlands | XCO | Daan Soete (BEL); Puck Pieterse (NED) | Erno McCrae (BEL); Emeline Detilleux (BEL) | Pierre de Froidmont (BEL); Alicia Franck (BEL) | |
| 29 July–1 August | Colina Triste | Spain | XCM | Hans Becking (NED); José Dias (POR); Sílvia Roura Pérez (ESP); Naima Diesner (GER) | Francesc Guerra Carretero (ESP); Guillem Cassú Cantin (ESP); Celina Carpinteiro (POR); Almudena Rodríguez (ESP) | Wout Alleman (BEL); Vinzent Dorn (GER); Estíbaliz Pérez Segura (ESP); Aránzazu Martín Pérez (ESP) | |
| 30 July | Sakarya Büyükşehir Belediyesi MTB Cup – XCO | Turkey | XCO | Gregor Raggl (AUT); Barbara Benkó (HUN) | Karl Markt (AUT); Emeline Detilleux (BEL) | Gian Andri Schmid (SUI); Tamara Wiedmann (AUT) | |
| 30 July–1 August | E-Tour de la Haute Tarentaise – E-MTB | France | E-MTB | Jérôme Gilloux (FRA); Nadine Sapin (FRA) | Hugo Pigeon (FRA); Nathalie Schneitter (SUI) | Charles Murray (NZL); Tracy Moseley (GBR) | |
| 30 July–1 August | MTB French Cup Powered By SKF- XCO/XCC/XCE | France | XCO; XCC; XCE | Titouan Carod (FRA) (XCO); Léna Gérault (FRA) (XCO); Ben Oliver (NZL) (XCC); Martina Berta (ITA) (XCC); Yannis Musy (FRA) (XCE); Manon Wimmer (FRA) (XCE) | Simon Andreassen (DEN) (XCO); Martina Berta (ITA) (XCO); Simon Andreassen (DEN) (XCC); Hélène Clauzel (FRA) (XCC); Thibaut Kahlhoven (FRA) (XCE); Amélie Vazeille (FRA) (XCE) | Maxime Marotte (FRA) (XCO); Greta Seiwald (ITA) (XCO); Maxime Loret (FRA) (XCC); Léna Gérault (FRA) (XCC); Hugo Briatta (FRA) (XCE); Léa Bouilloux (FRA) (XCE) | |
| 31 July | M^{3} Montafon Mountainbike Marathon | Austria | XCM | Sascha Weber (GER); Robyn de Groot (RSA) | Hansueli Stauffer (SUI); Adelheid Morath (GER) | Frans Claes (BEL); Angelika Tazreiter (AUT) | |
| 31 July | Telluride 100 Mountain Bike Race | United States | XCM | Keegan Swenson (USA); Alexis Skarda (USA) | Kyle Trudeau (USA); Kateřina Nash (CZE) | Nash Dory (USA); Helena Gilbert-Snyder (USA) | |
| 31 July–1 August | Izomat MTB Cup 2021 – Hlinsko CZ | Czech Republic | XCO | Bartłomiej Wawak (POL); Jana Czeczinkarová (CZE) | Krzysztof Łukasik (POL); Katarzyna Solus-Miśkowicz (POL) | Lukáš Kobes (CZE); Aleksandra Podgórska (POL) | |

=== August ===
| Date | Race name | Location | UCI Rating | Winner | Second | Third | Ref |
|---|---|---|---|---|---|---|---|
| 1 August | Balkan Championships | Bosnia and Herzegovina | XCO | Dmytro Titarenko (UKR); Lejla Tanović (BIH) | Ede-Károly Molnár (ROU); Aikaterini Eleftheriadou (GRE) | Patrick Pescaru (ROU); Eirini Maria Karousou (GRE) | |
| 1 August | UCI MTB MARATHON SERIES – Sakarya – XCM | Turkey | XCM | Martin Stošek (CZE); Barbara Benkó (HUN) | Andreas Seewald (GER); Stefanie Dohrn (GER) | Kristián Hynek (CZE); Nikol Flašarová (CZE) | |
| 3–5 August | IXS European Downhill Cup | Slovenia | DHI | Greg Minnaar (RSA); Mille Johnset (NOR) | Henry Kerr (IRL); Phoebe Gale (GBR) | Adam Brayton (GBR); Abigail Hogie (USA) | |
| 4–7 August | Ischgl Ironbike Stage Race | Austria | XCM | Urs Huber (SUI); Ariane Lüthi (SUI) | Frans Claes (BEL); Kelsey Urban (USA) | Markus Kaufmann (GER); Angelika Tazreiter (AUT) | |
| 7 August | Simplicity MTB Festival | Norway | XCO | Erik Hægstad (NOR); Elisabeth Sveum (NOR) | Knut Røhme (NOR); Ingrid Bøe Jacobsen (NOR) | Ole Sigurd Rekdahl (NOR); Sigrid Andrea Fløgstad (NOR) | |
| 7 August | Kolo pro život: Nova Vysočina Arena Tour | Czech Republic | XCM | Filip Adel (CZE); Klára Pavelková (CZE) | Matouš Ulman (CZE); Nikol Flašarová (CZE) | Jaromír Skála (CZE); Kateřina Drhová (CZE) | |
| 7 August | Triada MTB Păltiniș | Romania | XCO | Martin Haring (SVK); Lejla Tanović (BIH) | Tomer Zaltsman (ISR); Regina Schmidel (HUN) | Tomáš Ševců (CZE); Manuela Mureșan (ROU) | |
| 7–8 August | Test Event European Championship-XCO-XCE | Serbia | XCO; XCE | Zsombor Palumby (HUN) (XCO); Iryna Popova (UKR) (XCO); Florián Papcun (SVK) (XCE); Iryna Popova (UKR) (XCE) | Oleksandr Koniaiev (UKR) (XCO); Maria Sherstiuk (UKR) (XCO); Christos Philokyprou (CYP) (XCE); Maria Sherstiuk (UKR) (XCE) | Matej Ulík (SVK) (XCO); Maruša Knap (SVN) (XCO); Nikolaos Georgiadis (GRE) (XCE); Bojana Jovanović (SRB) (XCE) | |
| 7–8 August | Mountain Creek Spring National | United States | DHI | Neko Mulally (USA); Kailey Skelton (USA) | Stephen Estabrook (USA); Mazie Hayden (USA) | Nikolas Nestoroff (USA); Rachel Pageau (CAN) | |
| 8 August | Copa Juvenil Mezuena | Colombia | XCO | Jhonnatan Botero Villegas (COL); Angie Milena Lara (COL) | Nelson Duván Peña (COL); Natalia André Duarte (COL) | José Albert Gonzalez (COL); Liseth Bustos (COL) | |
| 8 August | Zanzenberg XCO | Austria | XCO | Lars Forster (SUI); Mona Mitterwallner (AUT) | Andri Frischknecht (SUI); Laura Stigger (AUT) | Filippo Colombo (SUI); Sina Frei (SUI) | |
| 8 August | Horská kola Stupno | Czech Republic | XCO | Ondřej Cink (CZE); Anne Terpstra (NED) | Marek Rauchfuss (CZE); Jana Czeczinkarová (CZE) | Lukáš Kobes (CZE); Adéla Holubová (CZE) | |
| 8 August | City Mountainbike – XCC | Belgium | XCC | Jeroen van Eck (NED); Mariske Strauss (RSA) | Lorenzo Serres (FRA); Gaia Tormena (ITA) | Robin Mougel (FRA); Marion Fromberger (GER) | |
| 11–13 August | E-Tour du Mont Blanc – E-MTB | Switzerland | E-MTB | Kenny Muller (FRA); Jérôme Gilloux (FRA); Sofia Wiedenroth (GER); Alexandra Marchal (BEL) | Kieran Page (GBR); Fred Horny (FRA); Nathalie Schneitter (SUI); Cornelia Hug (SUI) | Matt Lombardi (RSA); Francescu Camoin (FRA) | |
| 15 August | City Mountainbike – XCC | Belgium | XCC | Jeroen van Eck (NED); Gaia Tormena (ITA) | José Cabrera González (MEX); Lia Schrievers (GER) | Arne Janssens (BEL); Mariske Strauss (RSA) | |
| 15 August | Shimano MTB Liga – Powered by Allbike #2 | Denmark | XCO | Ian Millennium (DEN); Ann-Dorthe Lisbygd (DEN) | Niels Rasmussen (DEN); Viktoria Knudsen (DEN) | André Eriksson (SWE); Klara Sofie Hansen (DEN) | |
| 16 August | Abierto Argentino XCO | Argentina | XCO | Fernando Contreras (ARG); Agustina Apaza (ARG) | Jorge Álvaro Macías (ARG); Mariana Casadey (ARG) | Franco Martín Molina (ARG); Florencia Anabel Ávila (ARG) | |
| 17–21 August | Swiss Epic | Switzerland | XCM | Nicola Rohrbach (SUI); Lukas Flückiger (SUI); Ariane Lüthi (SUI); Robyn de Groot (RSA) | Hans Becking (NED); Francesc Guerra Carretero (ESP); Adelheid Morath (GER); Angelika Tazreiter (AUT) | Konny Looser (SUI); Sören Nissen (LUX); Costanza Fasolis (ITA); Claudia Peretti (ITA) | |
| 19 August | Dieppe Canada Cup XCC | Canada | XCC | Raphaël Auclair (CAN); Julianne Sarrazin (CAN) | Andrew L'Esperance (CAN); Emma Olson (CAN) | Logan Sadesky (CAN); Kaitlyn Shikaze (CAN) | |
| 21 August | UCI MTB MARATHON SERIES – Grand Raid BCVS – MTB Alpine Cup – XCM | Switzerland | XCM | Andreas Seewald (GER); Estelle Morel (FRA) | Martin Stošek (CZE); Janine Schneider (GER) | Martin Fanger (SUI); Kataržina Sosna (LTU) | |
| 21 August | Momentum Medical Scheme Attakwas Extreme presented by Biogen – XCM | South Africa | XCM | Wessel Botha (RSA); Yolande de Villiers (RSA) | Alex Miller (NAM); Amy McDougall (RSA) | Marco Joubert (RSA); Sarah Hill (RSA) | |
| 21 August | Dieppe Canada Cup XCO | Canada | XCO | Andrew L'Esperance (CAN); Julianne Sarrazin (CAN) | Raphaël Auclair (CAN); Eva Poidevin (CAN) | Victor Verreault (CAN); Amélie Simard (CAN) | |
| 21–22 August | iXS European Downhill Cup | Czech Republic | DHI | Tristan Botteram (NED); Izabela Yankova (BUL) | Adam Rojček (SVK); Justine Welzel (GER) | Austin Dooley (USA); Marlena Neißl (AUT) | |
| 21–22 August | MTB French Cup Powered By SKF – XCO/DHI | France | XCO; DHI | Joshua Dubau (FRA) (XCO); Léna Gérault (FRA) (XCO); Antoine Pierron (FRA) (DHI); Agnès Delest (FRA) (DHI) | Thomas Griot (FRA) (XCO); Julie Bresset (GER) (XCO); Antoine Rogge (FRA) (DHI); Mariana Salazar (ESA) (XCO) | Mathis Azzaro (FRA) (XCO); Noémie Garnier (FRA) (XCO); Mattéo Iniguez (FRA) (DHI); Lauryne Chappaz (FRA) (DHI) | |
| 21–22 August | Oslo Terrengsykkelfestival | Norway | XCC; XCO | Knut Røhme (NOR) (XCC); Hedda Brenningen Bjørklund (NOR) (XCC); Erik Hægstad (NOR) (XCO); Berit Nordsæter Resell (NOR) (XCO) | Mats Tubaas Glende (NOR) (XCC); Ingrid Bøe Jacobsen (NOR) (XCC); Mats Tubaas Glende (NOR) (XCO); Ingrid Bøe Jacobsen (NOR) (XCO) | Tormod Weydahl (NOR) (XCC); Sigrid Andrea Fløgstad (NOR) (XCC); Knut Røhme (NOR) (XCO); Hedda Brenningen Bjørklund (NOR) (XCO) | |
| 21–22 August | PROFFIX Swiss Bike Cup Basel | Switzerland | XCO | Sam Gaze (NZL); Laura Stigger (AUT) | Lars Forster (SUI); Linda Indergand (SUI) | Jordan Sarrou (FRA); Rebecca McConnell (AUS) | |
| 22 August | Yenice MTB Cup | Turkey | XCO | Esat Ceylan (TUR); Zehra Kargin (TUR) | Süleyman Temel (TUR) | Zeki Kaygisiz (TUR) | |
| 22 August | City Mountainbike – XCC | Netherlands | XCC | Jeroen van Eck (NED); Gaia Tormena (ITA) | Simon Gegenheimer (GER); Marion Fromberger (GER) | Felix Klausmann (SWE); Chimène Muriël Boer (NED) | |
| 29 August | Mátra Mountain Bike Marathon | Hungary | XCM | András Szatmáry (HUN); Lejla Tanović (BIH) | Márton Blazsó (HUN) | Benedek Borsos (HUN) | |

=== September ===
| Date | Race name | Location | UCI Rating | Winner | Second | Third | Ref |
|---|---|---|---|---|---|---|---|
| 2 September | ENDURO WORLD SERIES – Loudenvielle – EWS 1 | France | END | Jack Moir (AUS); Harriet Harnden (GBR) | Richard Rude Jr. (USA); Mélanie Pugin (FRA) | Kevin Miquel (FRA); Noga Korem (ISR) | |
| 4 September | CIMTB Michelin – Copa Internacional MTB – XCC | Brazil | XCC | Sherman Trezza (BRA); Hercília Najara (BRA) | Mário Couto (BRA); Isabella Lacerda (BRA) | Kennedi Sampaio (BRA); Letícia Cândido (BRA) | |
| 4 September | Huskvarna MTB-Tour | Sweden | XCO | Axel Lindh (SWE); Emma Belforth (SWE) | Matthias Wengelin (SWE); Hanna Millved (SWE) | Michael Olsson (SWE); Åsa Maria Erlandsson (SWE) | |
| 4 September | ENDURO WORLD SERIES – Loudenvielle – EWS 2 | France | END | Jack Moir (AUS); Isabeau Courdurier (FRA) | Richard Rude Jr. (USA); Morgane Charre (FRA) | Kevin Miquel (FRA); Mélanie Pugin (FRA) | |
| 5 September | CIMTB Michelin – Copa Internacional MTB – XCO | Brazil | XCO | José Gabriel (BRA); Isabella Lacerda (BRA) | Sherman Trezza (BRA); Karen Olímpio (BRA) | Mário Couto (BRA); Letícia Cândido (BRA) | |
| 5 September | Abierto Internacional – XCO | Argentina | XCO | Jorge Álvaro Macías (ARG); Agustina María Apaza (ARG) | Catriel Soto (ARG); Mariana Casadey (ARG) | Agustín Durán (ARG); Agustina Quirós (ARG) | |
| 5 September | Shimano MTB Liga – Powered By Allbike #3 | Denmark | XCO | Victor Philipsen (DEN); Viktoria Smidth Knudsen (DEN) | Niels Rasmussen (DEN); Ann-Dorthe Lisbygd (DEN) | Oliver Vedersø Sølvhøj (DEN); Emma Lyngholm (DEN) | |
| 5 September | XI Maraton BTT Sierra De Cazorla | Spain | XCM | Pablo Guerrero (ESP); Arantxa Salvadó Vergés (ESP) | Víctor Manuel Fernández (ESP); Susana Alonso Carballo (ESP) | Manuel Cordero Morgado (ESP); Mar Delgado González (ESP) | |
| 7–12 September | ENDURO WORLD SERIES – Crans-Montana – EWS + EWS-E | Switzerland | END | Richard Rude Jr. (USA); Mélanie Pugin (FRA); Nicolas Vouilloz (FRA) (E-MTB); Laura Charles (FRA) (E-MTB) | Jesse Melamed (CAN); Morgane Charre (FRA); Kévin Marry (FRA) (E-MTB); Tracy Moseley (GBR) (E-MTB) | Martin Maes (BEL); Noga Korem (ISR); Antoine Rogge (FRA) (E-MTB); Sofia Wiedenroth (GER) (E-MTB) | |
| 10 September | Giresun Bahçeşehir Üniversitesi Pirazis MTB Cup | Turkey | XCO | Süleyman Temel (TUR); Semra Yetiş (TUR) | Ahmet Akpınar (TUR); Zehra Kargın (TUR) | Serdar Tepe (TUR) | |
| 11 September | Mythos Primiero Dolomiti | Italy | XCM | Aleksey Medvedev (RUS); Giada Specia (ITA) | Jacopo Billi (ITA); Sandra Mairhofer (ITA) | Domenico Valerio (ITA); Deborah Piana (ITA) | |
| 11 September | CST Singletrack MTB Marathon Košice | Slovakia | XCM | Zsombor Palumby (HUN); Barbara Benkó (HUN) | András Szatmáry (HUN); Martina Krahulcová (SVK) | Benedek Borsos (HUN); Beáta Balázs (HUN) | |
| 11 September | International MTB Marathon Malevil Cup – XCM | Czech Republic | XCM | Marek Rauchfuss (CZE); Klára Pavelková (CZE) | Filip Adel (CZE); Nikol Flašarová (CZE) | Tomáš Višňovský (SVK); Jana Žideková (CZE) | |
| 11–12 September | Copa Catalana Internacional – Vallnord (Andorra) – XCO – DHI | Andorra | XCO; DHI | David Valero (ESP) (XCO); Rocío del Alba García (ESP) (XCO); Ignasi Jorba (ESP) (DHI); Nastasia Giménez (FRA) (DHI) | Hugo Drechou (FRA) (XCO); Natalia Fischer (ESP) (XCO); Carlos Langelaan (ESP) (DHI); Mélanie Chappaz (FRA) (DHI) | Ever Alejandro Gómez (ESP) (XCO); Viktoria Smidth Knudsen (DEN) (XCO); Adrián González (ESP) (DHI); Telma Torregrosa (ESP) (DHI) | |
| 11–12 September | Karl XII Rittet | Norway | XCC; XCO | Jonas Lindberg (DEN) (XCO); Linn Gustafzzon (SWE) (XCO); Erik Hægstad (NOR) (XCC); Ingrid Bøe Jacobsen (NOR) (XCC) | Knut Røhme (NOR) (XCO); Ingrid Bøe Jacobsen (NOR) (XCO); Ole Sigurd Rekdahl (NOR) (XCC); Linn Gustafzzon (SWE) (XCC) | Mats Tubaas Glende (NOR) (XCO); Hedda Brenningen Bjørklund (NOR) (XCO); Knut Røhme (NOR) (XCC); Hedda Brenningen Bjørklund (NOR) (XCC) | |
| 11–12 September | BjelaDH | Bosnia and Herzegovina | DHI | Gauthier Loncke (FRA) | Kristjan Vreček (SVN) | Bastien Ranger (SUI) | |
| 11–12 September | Izomat MTB Cup 2021 – Město Touškov CZ | Czech Republic | XCO | Mārtiņš Blūms (LVA); Steffi Häberlin (SUI) | Jan Vastl (CZE); Jana Czeczinkarová (CZE) | Lukáš Kobes (CZE); Ronja Eibl (GER) | |
| 12 September | International MTB Bundesliga – Vulkan Race Gedern | Germany | XCO | Julian Schelb (GER); Kim Ames (GER) | Nicklas Schehl (GER); Theresia Schwenk (GER) | Georg Egger (GER); Lina Dorscht (GER) | |
| 12 September | Komlós XCO | Hungary | XCO | András Parti (HUN); Regina Schmidel (HUN) | Zsombor Palumby (HUN) | András Szatmáry (HUN) | |
| 12 September | City Mountainbike – XCC | Germany | XCC | Jeroen van Eck (NED); Gaia Tormena (ITA) | Lorenzo Serres (FRA); Lia Schrievers (GER) | Felix Klausmann (GER); Faranak Partoazar (IRI) | |
| 12 September | 24. MTB Cross Country "Rund um den Roadlberg" | Austria | XCO | Gregor Raggl (AUT); Tamara Wiedmann (AUT) | Max Foidl (AUT); Jana Czeczinkarová (CZE) | Karl Markt (AUT); Elisabeth Osl (AUT) | |
| 12 September | MTB French Cup Powered By SKF – DHI | France | DHI | Valentin Chatanay (FRA); Lauryne Chappaz (FRA) | Antoine Rogge (FRA); Mathilde Bernard (FRA) | Ian Guionnet (FRA); Mariana Salazar (SLV) | |
| 12 September | UCI MTB MARATHON SERIES – La Forestiere | France | XCM | Andreas Seewald (GER); Ariane Lüthi (SUI) | Martin Stošek (CZE); Lejla Tanović (BIH) | Urs Huber (SUI); Kataržina Sosna (LTU) | |
| 15–19 September | ENDURO WORLD SERIES – Finale Ligure – EWS + EWS-E | Italy | END | Jack Moir (AUS); Morgane Charre (FRA); Nicolas Vouilloz (FRA) (E-MTB); Laura Charles (FRA) (E-MTB) | Jesse Melamed (CAN); Isabeau Courdurier (FRA); Adrien Dailly (FRA) (E-MTB); Tracy Moseley (GBR) (E-MTB) | Kevin Miquel (FRA); Rebecca Baraona (GBR); Kevin Marry (FRA); Nicole Göldi (SUI) (E-MTB) | |
| 16–19 September | Alpentour Trophy | Austria | XCM | Markus Kaufmann (GER); Angelika Tazreiter (AUT) | Alban Lakata (AUT); Chiara Patricia Beer (GER) | Pirmin Eisenbarth (GER); Hildegunn Gjertrud Hovdenak (NOR) | |
| 17–19 September | MTB French Cup Powered By Skf – XCO / XCC | France | XCO; XCC | Titouan Carod (FRA) (XCO); Lucie Urruty (FRA) (XCO); Titouan Carod (FRA) (XCC); Lucie Urruty (FRA) (XCC) | Jens Schuermans (BEL) (XCO); Lotte Koopmans (NED) (XCO); Joshua Dubau (FRA) (XCC); Manon Wimmer (FRA) (XCC) | Benjamin Le Ny (FRA) (XCO); Noémie Garnier (FRA) (XCO); Jens Schuermans (BEL) (XCC); Flavie Guille (FRA) (XCC) | |
| 17–19 September | iXS Downhill Cup + BMO 4X Rumble | Germany | DHI; 4X | Julian Steiner (GER) (DHI); Justine Welzel (GER) (DHI); Mikuláš Nevrkla (CZE) (4X); Josie McFall (GBR) (4X) | Luis Kiefer (GER) (DHI); Špela Horvat (SVN) (DHI); Benedikt Last (GER) (4X) | Gautier Jung (FRA) (DHI); Ramona Kupferschmied (SUI) (DHI); Ingo Kaufmann (GER) (4X) | |
| 19 September | Hallbyrundan | Sweden | XCO | Emil Lindgren (SWE); Linn Gustafzzon (SWE) | André Eriksson (SWE); Emma Belforth (SWE) | Axel Lindh (SWE); Ingrid Bøe Jacobsen (NOR) | |
| 19 September | Velká cena Vimperka | Czech Republic | XCO | Jan Sáska (CZE); Jana Czeczinkarová (CZE) | Lukáš Kobes (CZE); Jitka Čábelická (CZE) | Jan Škarnitzl (CZE) | |
| 19 September | Jura Bike Marathon | Switzerland | XCM | Sascha Weber (GER); Carmen Zaugg (SUI) | Martin Fanger (SUI); Antonia Bunter (SUI) | Casey South (SUI); Lea Hofer (SUI) | |
| 19 September | 7R CST MTB Gdynia Maraton | Poland | XCM | Jakub Zamroźniak (POL); Aleksandra Andrzejewska (POL) | Krzysztof Łukasik (POL); Klaudia Cichacka (POL) | Piotr Konwa (POL); Paula Budzyńska (POL) | |
| 19 September | Shimano MTB Liga – Powered by Allbike #4 | Denmark | XCO | Jonas Lindberg (DEN); Viktoria Smidth Knudsen (DEN) | Sebastian Fini Carstensen (DEN); Sofie Pedersen (DEN) | Tobias Lillelund (DEN); Ann-Dorthe Lisbygd (DEN) | |
| 24 September | Rye bike festival / Rye terrengsykkelfestival | Norway | XCO | Sebastian Fini Carstensen (DEN); Linn Gustafzzon (SWE) | Knut Røhme (NOR); Hedda Bjørklund (NOR) | Axel Lindh (SWE); Ingrid Bøe Jacobsen (NOR) | |
| 25 September | Csömör kupa | Hungary | XCO | Daniele Braidot (ITA); Barbara Benkó (HUN) | Marcel Guerrini (SUI); Regina Schmidel (HUN) | Zsombor Palumby (HUN); Virág Buzsáki (HUN) | |
| 25 September | Rye bike festival / Rye terrengsykkelfestival-XCC | Norway | XCC | Erik Hægstad (NOR); Janika Lõiv (EST) | Knut Røhme (NOR); Linn Gustafzzon (SWE) | Mats Tubaas Glende (NOR); Ingrid Bøe Jacobsen (NOR) | |
| 25 September | Maja Włoszczowska MTB Race | Poland | XCO | Ondřej Cink (CZE); Jolanda Neff (SUI) | Filip Helta (POL); Maja Włoszczowska (POL) | Jan Sáska (CZE); Katarzyna Solus-Miśkowicz (POL) | |
| 25 September | Sea Otter Europe Girona | Spain | XCM | Wout Alleman (BEL); Arantxa Salvadó Vergés (ESP) | Peeter Pruus (EST); Ramona Gabriel Batalla (ESP) | Francesc Guerra Carretero (ESP); Marta Torà Milà (ESP) | |
| 25 September | Singer Wäldercup | Germany | XCC | Maximilian Brandl (GER); Ronja Eibl (GER) | David List (GER); Corina Druml (AUT) | Niklas Schehl (GER); Emma Blömeke (GER) | |
| 25–26 September | Copa Catalana Internacional BTT | Spain | XCO | Samuel Gaze (NZL); Rocío del Alba (ESP) | Titouan Carod (FRA); Rebecca McConnell (AUS) | Thomas Griot (FRA); Lucie Urruty (FRA) | |
| 25–26 September | Petrich DHI | Bulgaria | DHI | Gauthier Loncke (FRA) | Stivian Gatev (BUL) | Dimitar Mazneykov (BUL) | |
| 25–26 September | PROFFIX Swiss Bike Cup Lugano | Switzerland | XCC | Joris Ryf (SUI); Linda Indergand (SUI) | Joel Roth (SUI); Sophie von Berswordt (NED) | Andri Frischknecht (SUI); Tina Züger (SUI) | |
| 26 September | Extreme Sur Loue – XCM | France | XCM | Julian Schelb (GER); Estelle Morel (FRA) | Clément Berthet (FRA); Barbara Liardet (FRA) | Niklas Sell (GER) | |
| 26 September | 20° Gara Internazionale di Mountain Bike Gimondibike | Italy | XCO | Diego Arias (COL); Silvia Scipioni (ITA) | Francesco Casagrande (ITA); Chiara Burato (ITA) | Juri Ragnoli (ITA); Martina Guerrera (ITA) | |
| 26 September | XCO Predolac | Croatia | XCO | Alessio Agostinelli (ITA); Zuzana Šafářová (CZE) | Benjamin Le Ny (FRA); Erika Nitelli (ITA) | Luciano Rota (ITA); Dora Čičin-Šain (CRO) | |
| 26 September | Copa Chile Internacional | Chile | XCO | Patricio Díaz Farías (CHI); Fernanda Castro (CHI) | Nicolás Delich (CHI); Evelyn Muñoz Jaramillo (CHI) | Víctor Cerdá Fuentes (CHI); María Trinidad Moreno (CHI) | |
| 26 September | Rye bike festival / Rye terrengsykkelfestival – XCO | Norway | XCO | Sebastian Fini Carstensen (DEN); Caroline Bohé (DEN) | Mārtiņš Blūms (LVA); Janika Lõiv (EST) | Erik Hægstad (NOR); Linn Gustafzzon (SWE) | |
| 26 September | UCI MTB MARATHON SERIES – Bike Maraton Jelenia Góra | Poland | XCM | Martin Stošek (CZE); Kataržina Sosna (LTU) | Simon Schneller (GER); Aleksandra Andrzejewska (POL) | Andreas Seewald (GER); Greete Steinburg (EST) | |
| 28 September–3 October | ENDURO WORLD SERIES – Tweed Valley – EWS + EWS-E | United Kingdom | END | Martin Maes (BEL); Rebecca Baraona (GBR); Nicolas Vouilloz (FRA) (E-MTB); Tracy Moseley (GBR) (E-MTB) | Jesse Melamed (CAN); Harriet Harnden (GBR); Kévin Marry (FRA) (E-MTB); Laura Charles (FRA) (E-MTB) | Adrien Dailly (FRA); Morgane Charre (FRA); Sam Hill (AUS) (E-MTB) | |

=== October ===
| Date | Race name | Location | UCI Rating | Winner | Second | Third | Ref |
|---|---|---|---|---|---|---|---|
| 1 October | Canmore Canada Cup-XCC | Canada | XCC | Léandre Bouchard (CAN); Jocelyn Stel (CAN) | Marc-André Fortier (CAN); Emma Olson (CAN) | Malcolm Barton (CAN); Emily Williams (CAN) | |
| 1–3 October | MTB French Cup Powered By SKF – XCO/XCE | France | XCO; XCE | Victor Koretzky (FRA) (XCO); Lucie Urruty (FRA) (XCO); Killian Demangeon (FRA) (XCE); Noémie Garnier (FRA) (XCE) | Titouan Carod (FRA) (XCO); Martina Berta (ITA) (XCO); Hugo Briatta (FRA) (XCE); Amélie Vazeille (FRA) (XCE) | Maxime Marotte (FRA) (XCO); Isaure Medde (FRA) (XCO); Maxence Lemardele (FRA) (XCE); Amandine Vidon (FRA) (XCE) | |
| 1–3 October | iXS Downhill Cup | Switzerland | DHI | Tristan Botteram (NED); Nina Hoffmann (GER) | Basil Weber (SUI); Delia da Mocogno (SUI) | Simon Maurer (GER); Lea Salomé Rutz (SUI) | |
| 2 October | City Mountainbike – XCC | Spain | XCC | Jeroen van Eck (NED); Gaia Tormena (ITA) | Emanuele Huez (ITA); Marion Fromberger (GER) | Lorenzo Serres (FRA); Didi de Vries (NED) | |
| 2 October | CIMTB Michelin – Copa Internacional MTB – XCC | Brazil | XCC | Henrique Avancini (BRA); Karen Olímpio (BRA) | Gustavo Xavier Pereira (BRA); Hercília Najara (BRA) | José Gabriel (BRA); Letícia Cândido (BRA) | |
| 2–3 October | PROFFIX Swiss Bike Cup Schaan | Liechtenstein | XCO | Luca Schwarzbauer (GER); Linda Indergand (SUI) | Andri Frischknecht (SUI); Nadine Rieder (GER) | Thomas Litscher (SUI); Luisa Daubermann (GER) | |
| 2–3 October | Canmore Canada Cup | Canada | XCO | Léandre Bouchard (CAN); Jennifer Jackson (CAN) | Marc-André Fortier (CAN); Joselyn Stel (CAN) | Peter Disera (CAN); Julianne Sarrazin (CAN) | |
| 3 October | Shimano MTB Liga – Powered by Allbike #5 | Denmark | XCO | Gustav Heby Pedersen (DEN); Line Mygdam (DEN) | Hugo Sandin (SWE); Ida Rishøj (DEN) | Christian Kornum (DEN); Tove Dandenell (SWE) | |
| 3 October | CIMTB Michelin – Copa Internacional MTB – HC | Brazil | XCO | Henrique Avancini (BRA); Isabella Lacerda (BRA) | José Gabriel (BRA); Letícia Cândido (BRA) | Gustavo Xavier Pereira (BRA); Hercília Najara (BRA) | |
| 3 October | Capoliveri Legend Cup's Eleven | Italy | XCM | Daniele Mensi (ITA); Silvia Scipioni (ITA) | Aleksey Medvedev (RUS); Sara Mazzorana (ITA) | Johnny Cattaneo (ITA); Barbora Průdková (CZE) | |
| 6–9 October | Epic Israel | Israel | XCM | Georg Egger (GER) | Lukas Baum (GER) | Gregor Raggl (AUT) | |
| 8 October | UCI MTB MARATHON SERIES – Roc D'azur | France | XCM | Andreas Seewald (GER); Kataržina Sosna (LTU) | Fabian Rabensteiner (ITA); Lejla Tanović (BIH) | Axel Roudil-Cortinat (FRA); Costanza Fasolis (ITA) | |
| 8 October | Sparta MTB Race #1 | Greece | XCO | Tomer Zaltsman (ISR); Giorgia Marchet (ITA) | Nelson Peña Franco (COL); Na'ama Noyman (ISR) | Ursin Spescha (SUI); Eirini Karousou (GRE) | |
| 9 October | Tierra Estella Epic | Spain | XCM | Pablo Rodríguez (ESP); Ainara Elbusto (ESP) | Iker Eskisabel (ESP); Corina Mesplet (ESP) | Josu Torres (ESP); Anjara Andueza (ESP) | |
| 9–10 October | Taça Brasil | Brazil | XCO | Ulan Galinski (BRA); Isabella Lacerda (BRA) | Guilherme Gotardelo Müller (BRA); Hercilia Najara (BRA) | Nicolas Romão (BRA); Letícia Cândido (BRA) | |
| 10 October | Sparta MTB Race #2 | Greece | XCO | Eitan Levi (ISR); Giorgia Marchet (ITA) | Ursin Spescha (SUI); Eirini Karousou (GRE) | Gioele De Cosmo (ITA); Varvara Fasoi (GRE) | |
| 10 October | XX Ruta BTT Gran Premio Villa De Paterna | Spain | XCM | David Arroyo (ESP); María Díaz Pernía (ESP) | José Márquez Granados (ESP); Celina Carpinteiro (POR) | Raúl Bermúdez Arjona (ESP); Almudena Rodríguez (ESP) | |
| 10 October | Latramun | Spain | XCM | Francesc Guerra (ESP); Sonia Quiroga (ESP) | Marek Rauchfuss (CZE); Ania Fontanet Rovira (ESP) | Alejandro Gómez (BOL); Gisela Biguet Espuña (ESP) | |
| 14 October | Kos Island XCO Race #1 | Greece | XCO | Bartłomiej Wawak (POL); Nadine Rieder (GER) | Mārtiņš Blūms (LVA); Jana Czeczinkarová (CZE) | Gioele De Cosmo (ITA); Marianne Théberge (CAN) | |
| 15 October | Kos Island XCO Race #2 | Greece | XCO | Bartłomiej Wawak (POL); Nadine Rieder (GER) | Mārtiņš Blūms (LVA); Jana Czeczinkarová (CZE) | Tomer Zaltsman (ISR); Giorgia Marchet (ITA) | |
| 16 October | Bike Marathon – XCM | Italy | XCM | Sascha Weber (GER); Mona Mitterwallner (AUT) | Hansueli Stauffer (SUI); Kataržina Sosna (LTU) | Karl Markt (AUT); Paulina Wörz (GER) | |
| 17 October | Kos Island XCE Race | Greece | XCE | Kyle Cameron (FRA); Marianne Théberge (CAN) | Marc-André Fortier (CAN); Eleftheria Giachou (GRE) | Jonathan Cantor (COL); Alexandra Adam (GRE) | |
| 17–24 October | UCI MTB MARATHON SERIES – ABSA Cape Epic | South Africa | XCM | Jordan Sarrou (FRA); Matthew Beers (RSA); Sina Frei (SUI); Laura Stigger (AUT) | Martin Frey (GER); Simon Stiebjahn (GER); Candice Lill (RSA); Mariske Strauss (RSA) | Hans Becking (NED); José Dias (POR); Ariane Lüthi (SUI); Robyn de Groot (RSA) | |
| 22 October | Salamina Epic MTB Race | Greece | XCO | Mārtiņš Blūms (LVA); Nadine Rieder (GER) | Bartłomiej Wawak (POL); Lotte Koopmans (NED) | Tomer Zaltsman (ISR); Anna Spielmann (AUT) | |
| 23 October | Salamina Epic MTB Race #2 | Greece | XCO | Georg Egger (GER); Nefelly Mangiaterra (ITA) | Lukas Baum (GER); Alexandra Adam (GRE) | Emanuele Huez (ITA); Varvara Fasoi (GRE) | |
| 23 October | Ayçiçeği Bisiklet Vadisi MTB Cup | Turkey | XCO | Vital Albin (SUI); Iryna Popova (UKR) | Simon Walter (SUI); Alina Sarkulova (KAZ) | Andrin Walter (SUI); Warinthorn Phetpraphan (THA) | |
| 24 October | TRANSRIVIERA | France | XCM | Pierre Billaud (FRA); Margot Moschetti (FRA) | Emeric Turcat (FRA); Danièle Troesch (FRA) | Maxime Folco (FRA) | |
| 24 October | Copa Chile Internacional CMPC Angol | Chile | XCO | Nicolás Delich (CHI); Evelyn Muñoz Jaramillo (CHI) | Patricio Farías Díaz (CHI); María Trinidad Moreno (CHI) | Nicolás Martín Soto (CHI); Fernanda Castro (CHI) | |
| 24 October | Abierto Argentino XCO #2 | Argentina | XCO | Jorge Álvaro Macías (ARG); Agustina Quirós (ARG) | Catriel Soto (ARG); Florencia Anabel Ávila (ARG) | Fernando Contreras (ARG); Pilar Adoue (ARG) | |
| 24 October | Salamina Epic MTB Race | Greece | XCO | Mārtiņš Blūms (LVA); Nadine Rieder (GER) | Erik Hægstad (NOR); Lotte Koopmans (NED) | David Nordemann (NED); Jana Czeczinkarová (CZE) | |
| 25 October | Sakarya Büyükşehir Belediyesi MTB Cup | Turkey | XCO | Evgenii Evgrafov (RUS); Tereza Tvarůžková (CZE) | Andrin Walter (SUI); Adéla Holubová (CZE) | Vital Albin (SUI); Warinthorn Phetpraphan (THA) | |
| 27 October | Sakarya Büyükşehir Belediyesi MTB Cup | Turkey | XCO | Vital Albin (SUI); Tereza Tvarůžková (CZE) | Simon Walter (SUI); Adéla Holubová (CZE) | Markus Eydt (GER); Iryna Popova (UKR) | |
| 29 October | Hero Dubai | United Arab Emirates | XCM | Martin Stošek (CZE); Ariane Lüthi (SUI) | Peeter Pruus (EST); Ramona Forchini (SUI) | Andreas Seewald (GER); Kataržina Sosna (LTU) | |
| 31 October | Copa Chile Internacional Valdivia | Chile | XCO | Víctor Cerda Fuentes (CHI); Catalina Vidaurre (CHI) | Nicolás Delich (CHI); Fernanda Castro (CHI) | Ignacio Gallo Florido (CHI); Yarela González (CHI) | |
| 31 October | Sakarya Büyükşehir Belediyesi MTB Cup | Turkey | XCO | Vital Albin (SUI); Tereza Tvarůžková (CZE) | Simon Walter (SUI); Iryna Popova (UKR) | Evgenii Evgrafov (RUS); Adéla Holubová (CZE) | |

=== November ===
| Date | Race name | Location | UCI Rating | Winner | Second | Third | Ref |
|---|---|---|---|---|---|---|---|
| 4–7 November | Crankworx Rotorua Downhill | New Zealand | DHI | Louis Hamilton (NZL); Jenna Hastings (NZL) | Dan Booker (AUS); Shania Rawson (NZL) | Jonty Vink (NZL); Casey Brown (CAN) | |
| 4–7 November | Costa Blanca Bike Race | Spain | XCM | Anton Sintsov (RUS); María Díaz Pernia (ESP) | Pablo Guerrero (ESP); Tessa Kortekaas (NED) | Sebastian Fini Carstensen (DEN); Sílvia Roura (ESP) | |
| 7–13 November | Brasil Ride Bahia | Brazil | XCM | Gustavo Xavier (BRA); Alex Malacarne (BRA); Naima Diesner (GER); Anna Jördens (ESP) | Hans Becking (NED); José Dias (POR); Marcella Toldi (BRA); Lutecia Azevedo (BRA) | Edson Resende (BRA); Ulan Galinski (BRA); Aline Olmedo (BRA); Lucinéia Brunetta (BRA) | |
| 14 November | ATCH Ruta de Los Abuelos | Chile | XCO | Benjamín Jarmen (CHI); Evelyn Muñoz Jaramillo (CHI) | Gonzalo Eguiguren (CHI); Paz Leiva (CHI) | Israel Sánchez (CHI); Bárbara Hernández (CHI) | |

=== December ===
| Date | Race name | Location | UCI Rating | Winner | Second | Third | Ref |
|---|---|---|---|---|---|---|---|
| 4 December | CIMTB Michelin – Copa Internacional MTB – XCC | Brazil | XCC | Gustavo Xavier (BRA); Karen Olímpio (BRA) | José Gabriel (BRA); Isabella Lacerda (BRA) | Alex Malacarne (BRA); Hercília Najara (BRA) | |
| 5 December | CIMTB Michelin – Copa Internacional MTB | Brazil | XCC | Gustavo Xavier (BRA); Karen Olímpio (BRA) | Alex Malacarne (BRA); Isabella Lacerda (BRA) | José Gabriel (BRA); Raiza Goulão (BRA) | |
| 14–18 December | Brasil Ride | Brazil | XCM | Sherman Trezza de Paiva (BRA); Lukas Kaufmann (BRA); Paula Novais (BRA); Isabella Lacerda (BRA) | Ricardo Pscheidt (BRA); Leandro Donizete (BRA); Marcella Toldi (BRA); Fabiana Gregório Brandão (BRA) | David Rosa (POR); Vítor Bento (BRA); Naima Diesner (GER); Letícia Cândido (BRA) | |

== 2020 Summer Olympics ==
| Date | Race name | Location | UCI Rating | Winner | Second | Third | Ref |
|---|---|---|---|---|---|---|---|
| 26 July | Men's cross-country | Japan | XCO | Tom Pidcock; Great Britain | Mathias Flückiger; Switzerland | David Valero; Spain | |
| 27 July | Women's cross-country | Japan | XCO | Jolanda Neff; Switzerland | Sina Frei; Switzerland | Linda Indergand; Switzerland | |

== 2021 Junior Pan American Games ==
| Date | Race name | Location | UCI Rating | Winner | Second | Third | Ref |
|---|---|---|---|---|---|---|---|
| 27 November | Men's U23 cross-country | Colombia | XCO | Martín Vidaurre (CHI) | Nelson Peña (COL) | Gustavo Xavier (BRA) | |
| 27 November | Women's U23 cross-country | Colombia | XCO | Angie Lara (COL) | Ana María Roa (COL) | Giuliana Morgen (BRA) | |

== 2021 UCI Mountain Bike World Cup ==
| Date | Race name | Location | UCI Rating | Winner | Second | Third | Ref |
|---|---|---|---|---|---|---|---|
| 24 April | UCI E-MTB Cross-Country World Cup | Monaco | E-MTB | Jérôme Gilloux (FRA); Sofia Wiedenroth (GER) | Joris Ryf (SUI); Kathrin Stirnemann (SUI) | Hugo Pigeon (FRA); Karen Pepper (GBR) | |
| 25 April | UCI E-MTB Cross-Country World Cup | Monaco | E-MTB | Jérôme Gilloux (FRA); Sofia Wiedenroth (GER) | Joris Ryf (SUI); Mélanie Pugin (FRA) | Hugo Pigeon (FRA); Kathrin Stirnemann (SUI) | |
| 8 May | UCI Cross-Country World Cup | Germany | XCC | Mathieu van der Poel (NED); Pauline Ferrand-Prévot (FRA) | Victor Koretzky (FRA); Linda Indergand (SUI) | Nino Schurter (SUI); Annie Last (GBR) | |
| 9 May | UCI Cross-Country World Cup | Germany | XCO | Victor Koretzky (FRA); Loana Lecomte (FRA) | Nino Schurter (SUI); Pauline Ferrand-Prévot (FRA) | Mathias Flückiger (SUI); Haley Batten (USA) | |
| 14 May | UCI Cross-Country World Cup | Czech Republic | XCC | Mathieu van der Poel (NED); Haley Batten (USA) | Tom Pidcock (GBR); Loana Lecomte (FRA) | Jordan Sarrou (FRA); Jenny Rissveds (SWE) | |
| 16 May | UCI Cross-Country World Cup | Czech Republic | XCO | Tom Pidcock (GBR); Loana Lecomte (FRA) | Mathieu van der Poel (NED); Haley Batten (USA) | Mathias Flückiger (SUI); Rebecca McConnell (AUS) | |
| 5 June | UCI E-MTB Cross-Country World Cup | Italy | E-MTB | Jérôme Gilloux (FRA); Nathalie Schneitter (SUI) | Joris Ryf (SUI); Mélanie Pugin (FRA) | Francescu Camoin (FRA); Jacqueline Mariacher (AUT) | |
| 6 June | UCI E-MTB Cross-Country World Cup | Italy | E-MTB | Jérôme Gilloux (FRA); Mélanie Pugin (FRA) | Joris Ryf (SUI); Nathalie Schneitter (SUI) | Andrea Garibbo (ITA); Noa Wischmann (GER) | |
| 11 June | UCI Cross-Country World Cup | Austria | XCC | Mathias Flückiger (SUI); Loana Lecomte (FRA) | Ondřej Cink (CZE); Rebecca McConnell (AUS) | Milan Vader (NED); Jolanda Neff (SUI) | |
| 12 June | UCI Cross-Country World Cup | Austria | DHI | Troy Brosnan (AUS); Camille Balanche (FRA) | Thibaut Dapréla (FRA); Valentina Höll (AUT) | Amaury Pierron (FRA); Monika Hrastnik (SVN) | |
| 13 June | UCI Cross-Country World Cup | Austria | XCO | Mathias Flückiger (SUI); Loana Lecomte (FRA) | Ondřej Cink (CZE); Jenny Rissveds (SWE) | Anton Cooper (NZL); Laura Stigger (AUT) | |
| 2 July | UCI Cross-Country World Cup | France | XCC | Mathias Flückiger (SUI); Pauline Ferrand-Prévot (FRA) | Jordan Sarrou (FRA); Sina Frei (SUI) | Ondřej Cink (CZE); Jenny Rissveds (SWE) | |
| 3 July | UCI Cross-Country World Cup | France | DHI | Thibaut Dapréla (FRA); Tahnée Seagrave (GBR) | Max Hartenstern (GER); Myriam Nicole (FRA) | Baptiste Pierron (FRA); Camille Balanche (SUI) | |
| 4 July | UCI Cross-Country World Cup | France | XCO | Mathias Flückiger (SUI); Loana Lecomte (FRA) | Ondřej Cink (CZE); Jenny Rissveds (SWE) | Jordan Sarrou (FRA); Evie Richards (GBR) | |
| 17 July | UCI E-MTB Cross-Country World Cup | Monaco | E-MTB | Joris Ryf (SUI); Mélanie Pugin (FRA) | Jérôme Gilloux (FRA); Sofia Wiedenroth (GER) | Théo Charmes (FRA); Nathalie Schneitter (SUI) | |
| 18 July | UCI E-MTB Cross-Country World Cup | Monaco | E-MTB | Joris Ryf (SUI); Nathalie Schneitter (SUI) | Jérôme Gilloux (FRA); Laura Charles (FRA) | Théo Charmes (FRA); Mélanie Pugin (FRA) | |
| 8 August | UCI MTB Eliminator World Cup | Belgium | XCE | Simon Gegenheimer (GER); Gaia Tormena (ITA) | Jeroen van Eck (NED); Lia Schrievers (GER) | Titouan Perrin-Ganier (FRA); Marion Fromberger (GER) | |
| 14–15 August | UCI Cross-Country World Cup | Slovenia | DHI | Loris Vergier (FRA); Myriam Nicole (FRA) | Thibaut Dapréla (FRA); Eleonora Farina (ITA) | Laurie Greenland (GBR); Camille Balanche (SUI) | |
| 15 August | UCI MTB Eliminator World Cup | Belgium | XCE | Lorenzo Serres (FRA); Gaia Tormena (ITA) | Simon Gegenheimer (GER); Lia Schrievers (GER) | Anton Olstam (SWE); Ella Holmegård (SWE) | |
| 22 August | UCI MTB Eliminator World Cup | Netherlands | XCE | Jeroen van Eck (NED); Gaia Tormena (ITA) | Anton Olstam (SWE); Marion Fromberger (GER) | Simon Gegenheimer (GER); Ella Holmegård (SWE) | |
| 4 September | UCI Cross-Country World Cup | Switzerland | XCC | Henrique Avancini (BRA); Jenny Rissveds (SWE) | Mathias Flückiger (SUI); Evie Richards (GBR) | Victor Koretzky (FRA); Jolanda Neff (SUI) | |
| 4 September | UCI Cross-Country World Cup | Switzerland | DHI | Loris Vergier (FRA); Myriam Nicole (FRA) | Loïc Bruni (FRA); Tahnée Seagrave (GBR) | Thibaut Dapréla (FRA); Valentina Höll (AUT) | |
| 5 September | UCI Cross-Country World Cup | Switzerland | XCO | Victor Koretzky (FRA); Evie Richards (GBR) | Nino Schurter (SUI); Rebecca McConnell (AUS) | Mathias Flückiger (SUI); Jenny Rissveds (SWE) | |
| 12 September | UCI MTB Eliminator World Cup | Germany | XCE | Titouan Perrin-Ganier (FRA); Gaia Tormena (ITA) | Jeroen van Eck (NED); Lia Schrievers (GER) | Lorenzo Serres (FRA); Marion Fromberger (GER) | |
| 15 September | UCI Cross-Country World Cup | United States | DHI #1 | Reece Wilson (GBR); Valentina Höll (AUT) | Loïc Bruni (FRA); Camille Balanche (SUI) | Loris Vergier (FRA); Marine Cabirou (FRA) | |
| 17 September | UCI MTB Eliminator World Cup | France | XCE | Titouan Perrin-Ganier (FRA); Noémie Garnier (FRA) | Simon Gegenheimer (GER); Lia Schrievers (GER) | Jeroen van Eck (NED); Marion Fromberger (GER) | |
| 18 September | UCI Cross-Country World Cup | United States | XCC | Victor Koretzky (FRA); Evie Richards (GBR) | Henrique Avancini (BRA); Jolanda Neff (SUI) | Filippo Colombo (SUI); Jenny Rissveds (SWE) | |
| 18 September | UCI Cross-Country World Cup | United States | DHI #2 | Loïc Bruni (FRA); Valentina Höll (AUT) | Troy Brosnan (AUS); Marine Cabirou (FRA) | Ángel Suárez (ESP); Camille Balanche (SUI) | |
| 19 September | UCI Cross-Country World Cup | United States | XCO | Christopher Blevins (USA); Evie Richards (GBR) | Vlad Dascălu (ROU); Rebecca McConnell (AUS) | Ondřej Cink (CZE); Anne Tauber (NED) | |
| 24 September | UCI E-MTB Cross-Country World Cup | Spain | E-MTB | Jeroen van Eck (NED); Sandra Santanyes (ESP) | Jérôme Gilloux (FRA); Malene Degn (DEN) | Théo Charmes (FRA); Josefina Casadey (ARG) | |
| 2 October | UCI MTB Eliminator World Cup | Spain | XCE | Jeroen van Eck (NED); Gaia Tormena (ITA) | Simon Gegenheimer (GER); Marion Fromberger (GER) | Lorenzo Serres (FRA); Didi de Vries (NED) | |
| 16 October | UCI E-MTB Cross-Country World Cup | Spain | E-MTB | Jérôme Gilloux (FRA); Laura Charles (FRA) | Joris Ryf (SUI); Kathrin Stirnemann (SUI) | Théo Charmes (FRA); Mélanie Pugin (FRA) | |

== National Championships ==
| Nation | DH | XCO | END | XCE | XCM | E-XC | XCC |
|---|---|---|---|---|---|---|---|
| Andorra | Joan Aracil | Xavier Jové | | | | | |
| Argentina | | Catriel Soto; Agustina Apaza | | | Facundo Pérez Costa; Yesica Cantelmi | | Catriel Soto; Vanina Ailen |
| Aruba | | Paul Cremers | | | | | |
| Australia | Troy Brosnan; Sian A'Hern | Daniel McConnell; Rebecca McConnell | Remy Meier Smith; Lia Ladbrook | | | Joshua Carlson; Rebecca McConnell | Daniel McConnell; Rebecca McConnell |
| Austria | David Trummer; Sophie Gutöhrle | Maximilian Foidl; Mona Mitterwallner | Daniel Schemmel; Cornelia Holland | Daniel Federspiel; Laura Stigger | Alban Lakata; Angelika Tazreiter | | Gregor Raggl; Laura Stigger |
| Belgium | | Jens Schuermans; Emeline Detilleux | | | Wout Alleman; Joyce Vanderbeken | | |
| Bermuda | | Brian Steinhoff; Jennifer Wilson | | | | | |
| Bosnia and Herzegovina | | Vedad Karic; Lejla Tanović | | | Vedad Karic; Lejla Tanović | | |
| Botswana | | Gontse Lethokwe; Matshidiso Ebudilwe | | | | | |
| Brazil | | Henrique Avancini; Karen Olímpio | | | Ulan Galinski; Karen Olímpio | Ronaldo Goulart | Henrique Avancini; Karen Olímpio |
| Bulgaria | Stivian Gatev; Izabela Yankova | Bogdan Stoytchev; Joana Vylkanova | Ivan Kolev; Martina Grigorova | | Bogdan Stoytchev; Hristina Kozareva | | |
| Canada | Finn Iles; Casey Brown | Léandre Bouchard; Jennifer Jackson | | | | | Quinton Disera; Sandra Walter |
| Chile | Milciades Jaque; Antonia Saelzer | Nicolás Delich Pardo; Evelyn Muñoz Jaramillo | | | | | |
| Colombia | Camilo Sánchez Salazar; Jineth Michel Berdugo | Fabio Castañeda; Laura Abril | | | Héctor Leonardo Páez; Mónica Calderon | | |
| Costa Rica | Roberto Castillo; Katherine Herrera | Joseph Ramirez Venegas; Milagro Mena | Johnny Flores Mora; Laura Porras Sánchez | Raymond González; Milagro Mena | Paolo Montoya; Adriana Rojas | Mariano Herrera | Carlos Herrera; Milagro Mena |
| Croatia | | Matija Meštrić; Larisa Bošnjak | Ivan Bašić | | Anthony Bilić; Gorana Težak | | |
| Cyprus | Andreas Theodorou; Styliana Kamilari | Andreas Miltiadis; Elina Sofokleous | | Georgios Kouzis; Constantina Georgiou | Andreas Miltiadis | | |
| Czech Republic | Stanislav Sehnal; Barbora Průdková | Ondřej Cink; Jitka Čábelická | | | Jan Strož; Adéla Holubová | Marek Rachfuss | Jan Vastl; Jitka Čábelická |
| Denmark | | Simon Andreassen; Caroline Bohé | | | | | |
| Ecuador | | Juan Padilla Reyes; Michela Molina | | | Nexar Cedeño; Estefanía Vera | | |
| El Salvador | Jose Peña; Mariana Salazar | Rafael Carías; Xenia Estrada | | | | | |
| Estonia | Robert Johanson; Maaris Meier | Martin Loo; Janika Lõiv | | | Josten Vaidem; Janelle Uibokand | | |
| Finland | | Samuel Pökälä; Noora Kanerva | | Andre Haga; Kajsa Salmela | | | |
| France | Benoît Coulanges; Myriam Nicole | Maxime Marotte; Loana Lecomte | | Titouan Perrin-Ganier; Noémie Garnier | | Nicolas Vouilloz; Justine Tonso | Victor Koretzky; Hélène Clauzel |
| Georgia | | Giorgi Suvadzoglu | | | | | |
| Germany | Simon Maurer; Nina Hoffmann | Manuel Fumic; Leonie Daubermann | | | Luca Schwarzbauer; Nadine Rieder | | |
| Greece | | Periklis Ilias; Varvara Fasoi | | Nikos Georgiadis; Eleftheria Giachou | Ilias Tsortouktsidis | | Haroun Molla; Alexandra Adam |
| United Kingdom | Matt Walker; Katherine Sharp | Frazer Clacherty; Isla Short | | | | | |
| Honduras | Diego Vijil; María José Montoya Talavera | Luis Enrique López Nolasco; Karen Canales | | | | | |
| Hong Kong | | Kwun Hei Ho; Law Ching-kiu | | | | | |
| Hungary | Gábor Palotai; Erzsébet Vincze | András Parti; Kata Blanka Vas | László Kovács; Lilla Megyaszai | Zsombor Palumby; Adél Horváth | Zsombor Palumby; Adél Horváth | | Zsombor Palumby; Barbara Benkó |
| India | Gautam Taode | Shiven AeroHawk | | | | | |
| Indonesia | Andy Prayoga; Ayu Triya Andriana | Zaenal Fanani | Rama Teguh Ady Pratama; Regina Patricia Panie | Feri Yudoyono | | | |
| Iran | Hossein Zanjanian; Somayeh Davoodabadi Farahani | Faraz Shokri; Mona Farahbakhshian | | | | | |
| Ireland | Jacob Dickson; McKenna Merten | | Kelan Grant; Leah Maunsell | | | | |
| Israel | | Tomer Salzman; Na'ama Noyman | | | Eitan Levi; Lianne Witkin | | Tomer Salzman; Na'ama Noyman |
| Italy | Davide Cappello; Veronika Widmann | Nadir Colledani; Eva Lechner | Mirco Vendemmia; Nadine Ellecosta | Emanuele Huez; Eva Lechner | Fabian Rabensteiner; Marika Tovo | Martino Fruet; Anna Oberparleiter | Martino Fruet; Anna Oberparleiter |
| Japan | Kazuki Shimizu; Rina Matsumoto | Toki Sawada; Yōko Hashiguchi | | Naoto Morishita; Urara Kawaguchi | | | Toki Sawada; Urara Kawaguchi |
| Kazakhstan | | Shakir Adilov; Alina Sarkulova | | Damir Tursingali; Alina Sarkulova | Shakir Adilov | | Shakir Adilov |
| Latvia | | Mārtiņš Blūms; Zane Ķelpe | | | | | |
| Lithuania | Karolis Krukauskas | Ignas Ambrazas; Kataržina Sosna | | Tomas Pečiukaitis | Eimantas Gudiškis; Greta Karasiovaitė | | |
| Mauritius | | | | | Yannick Lincoln; Raphaëlle Lamusse | | |
| Mexico | | Gerardo Ulloa; Daniela Campuzano | | | | | Gerardo Ulloa; Daniela Campuzano |
| Moldova | | Cristian Raileanu | | | | | |
| Mongolia | Tugsbayar Otgonsuren | Bilguunjargal Erdenebat; Solongo Tserenlkham | Khuslen Battulga | | Bilguunjargal Erdenebat; Solongo Tserenlkham | | |
| Montenegro | | Goran Cerović | | | | | |
| Namibia | | Alex Miller; Luanne Van Der Schyff | | | Alex Miller; Carmen Johannes | Billy Haigan | |
| Netherlands | | Milan Vader; Anne Tauber | | | Hans Becking; Pauliena Rooijakkers | | |
| New Zealand | Sam Blenkinsop; Jessica Blewitt | Anton Cooper; Sammie Maxwell | | | | | |
| Nicaragua | | | | | Jaime Ramírez; Ana Laura Estrada | | |
| North Macedonia | | Emil Cvetanov; Aneta Antovska | | | | | |
| Norway | Simen Smestad; Kine Haugom | Erik Hægstad; Helene Marie Fossesholm | | Gabriel Cornelis Slinger; Celine Solheim | Emil Hasund Eid; Elisabeth Sveum | | Erik Hægstad; Ingrid Bøe Jacobsen |
| Panama | | Roberto Herrera; Valeska Domínguez | | | | | |
| Paraguay | | Lucas Bogado; Sara Torres | | Lucas Bogado; Sara Torres | Rogelio Melgarejo; Sara Torres | | |
| Poland | Damian Konstanty; Olivia Kulesza | Bartłomiej Wawak; Maja Włoszczowska | Sławomir Łukasik; Katarzyna Burek | Filip Helta; Maja Włoszczowska | Filip Helta; Maja Włoszczowska | | Bartłomiej Wawak; Maja Włoszczowska |
| Portugal | Gonçalo Bandeira; Margarida Bandeira | Ricardo Marinheiro; Raquel Queirós | José Borges; Sara Ferreira | | Bruno Sancho; Melissa Maia | | Ricardo Marinheiro; Ana Santos |
| Puerto Rico | | Georwill Pérez Román; Suheily Rodriguez Cruz | | | | | Jacob Morales Ortega; Suheily Rodriguez Cruz |
| Romania | | Vlad Dascălu; Manuela Mureșan | | Ede-Karoly Molnar; Eszter Bereczki | Roberto Burța; Eniko-Salome Bondor | | |
| Russia | Vitaly Khripunov; Anna Skumbina | Timofei Ivanov; Viktoria Kirsanova | | Arsentii Vavilov; Elvira Khairullina | Maxim Gogolev; Guzel Akhmadullina | | Nikolai Ivanov; Kristina Ilina |
| Serbia | | Aleksandar Roman; Jovana Crnogorac | | | | | |
| Sint Maarten | | Mark Maidwell | | | | Julien Renaud | |
| Slovakia | Michal Hlobil; Vanesa Petrovská | Martin Haring; Janka Keseg Števková | | Florián Papcun; Radka Paulechová | | | Matej Ulík; Janka Keseg Števková |
| Slovenia | Luka Berginc; Monika Hrastnik | Mihael Štajnar; Tanja Žakelj | | | | | |
| South Africa | Théo Erlangsen; Frances Du Toit | Alan Hatherly; Candice Lill | Johann Potgieter; Frances Du Toit | | Matt Beers; Yolande de Villiers | | |
| Spain | Alex Marín; Aina González | David Valero; Rocío García | Edgar Carballo; Sara Yusto Sánchez | David Campos Motos; Sara Gay | Marcos García; Natalia Fischer | Alberto Mingorance; Rocío García | Alberto Mingorance; Rocío García |
| Sweden | Oliver Zwar; Elina Davidsson | Matthias Wengelin; Jenny Rissveds | Zakarias Blom Johansen; Filippa Ring | Joel Burman; Jenny Rissveds | Matthias Wengelin; Jennie Stenerhag | | Vilgot Lindh; Jenny Rissveds |
| Switzerland | Yannick Baechler; Camille Balanche | Mathias Flückiger; Jolanda Neff | Patrick Lüthi; Lisa Baumann | | Lukas Flückiger; Ariane Lüthi | Jürg Graf; Nathalie Schneitter | |
| Thailand | Chinnapat Sukchanya; Vipavee Deekaballes | Keerati Sukprasart; Warinthorn Phetpraphan | | Methasit Boonsane; Natalie Panyawan | | | |
| Turkey | | Abdülkadir Kelleci; Esra Kürkçü | | | | | |
| Ukraine | | Oleksandr Koniaiev; Yana Belomoyna | | Viktor Vodolaha; Maria Sukhopalova | | | |
| Uruguay | | Gustavo Aramburu; Ana Laura Fontes | | | | | |
| United States | Dakotah Norton; Kailey Skelton | Keegan Swenson; Erin Huck | Cody Kelley; Amy Morrison | | Stephan Davoust; Alexis Skarda | | Keegan Swenson; Savilia Blunk |
| Venezuela | Carlos Terán | | | | | | |

== Continental and World Championships ==
| Championships | Race | Winner | Second | Third |
|---|---|---|---|---|
| American Continental Championships; Puerto Rico 24–28 March | XCO | Gerardo Ulloa; Mexico; Daniela Campuzano; Mexico | Jhonnatan Botero Villegas; Colombia; Sofia Gomez Villafañe; Argentina | Catriel Soto; Argentina; Kelsey Urban; United States |
| American Continental Championships; Puerto Rico 24–28 March | XCO U23 | Martín Vidaurre; Chile; Savilia Blunk; United States | Esteban Herrera Ochoa; Mexico; Madigan Munro; United States | Ángel Barrón López; Mexico; Catalina Vidaurre Kossmann; Chile |
| American Continental Championships; Puerto Rico 24–28 March | XCO Junior | Camilo Andrés Gómez; Colombia; Ruth Holcomb; United States | David Elías Rico Barraza; Mexico; Lauren Aggeler; United States | Daniel Ibañez Cardenas; Mexico; Mia Aseltine; United States |
| American Continental Championships; Puerto Rico 24–28 March | XCE | Jacob Morales; Puerto Rico; Kiara Marrero; Puerto Rico | Ricky Morales; Puerto Rico; Fátima Marin; Mexico | Sebastián Maldonado; Chile; Mikela Molina; Ecuador |
| American Continental Championships; Puerto Rico 24–28 March | XCC | Gerardo Ulloa; Mexico; Kelsey Urban; United States | Martín Vidaurre; Chile; Sofia Gomez Villafañe; Argentina | Patricio Díaz Farías; Chile; Daniela Campuzano; Mexico |
| American Continental Championships; Puerto Rico 24–28 March | XCR | United States (USA); Russell Finsterwald; Bradyn Lange; Ruth Holcomb; Ethan Villaneda; Madigan Munro; Savilia Blunk | Chile (CHI); Nicolás Delich Pardo; Evelyn Muñoz Jaramillo; Matías Urzúa; Sofía Mires Retamales; Catalina Vidaurre; Martín Vidaurre | Costa Rica (CRC); Steven Vargas Gómez; Isabella Gómez Meneses; Sebastián Brenes Mata; Marisol García Quiros; Milagro Mena; Carlos Herrera Arroyo |
| European Continental Championships – XCM; Switzerland 20 June | XCM | Andreas Seewald (GER); Natalia Fischer Egusquiza (ESP) | Samuele Porro (ITA); Steffi Häberlin (SUI) | Martin Stošek (CZE); Ramona Forchini (SUI) |
| European Continental Championships – Ultra XCM; Spain 26 June | Ultra XCM | Philip Handl (AUT); Anna Ramírez Bauxel (ESP) | Llibert Mill Garcia (ESP); Ramona Gabriel Batalla (ESP) | Dominik Schwaiger (GER); Marta Torà Milà (ESP) |
| European Continental Championships – DHI; Slovenia 8 August | DHI | Loris Vergier (FRA); Monika Hrastnik (SVN) | Benoît Coulanges (FRA); Eleonora Farina (ITA) | Danny Hart (GBR); Veronika Widmann (ITA) |
| European Continental Championships – DHI; Slovenia 8 August | DHI Junior | Jordan Williams (GBR); Izabela Yankova (BUL) | Davide Cappello (ITA); Sophie Gutöhrle (AUT) | Maximilian Oberhofer (AUT); Kine Haugom (NOR) |
| European Continental Championships – XCO-XCR-XCE; Serbia 12–15 August | XCO | Lars Forster; Switzerland; Pauline Ferrand-Prévot; France | Sebastian Fini Carstensen; Denmark; Anne Terpstra; Netherlands | Filippo Colombo; Switzerland; Anne Tauber; Netherlands |
| European Continental Championships – XCO-XCR-XCE; Serbia 12–15 August | XCO U23 | Joel Roth; Switzerland; Mona Mitterwallner; Austria | Juri Zanotti; Italy; Puck Pieterse; Netherlands | David List; Germany; Ronja Eibl; Germany |
| European Continental Championships – XCO-XCR-XCE; Serbia 12–15 August | XCO Junior | Oleksandr Hudyma; Ukraine; Line Burquier; France | Roman Holzer; Switzerland; Sara Cortinovis; Italy | Alexandre Martins; France; Lea Huber; Switzerland |
| European Continental Championships – XCO-XCR-XCE; Serbia 12–15 August | XCE | Jeroen van Eck; Netherlands; Gaia Tormena; Italy | Lorenzo Serres; France; Fem van Empel; Netherlands | Joel Burman; Sweden; Iryna Popova; Ukraine |
| European Continental Championships – XCO-XCR-XCE; Serbia 12–15 August | XCR | Italy (ITA); Luca Braidot; Filippo Agostinacchio; Martina Berta; Sara Cortinovis; Marika Tovo; Juri Zanotti | Switzerland (SUI); Vital Albin; Nils Aebersold; Alessandra Keller; Jacqueline Schneebeli; Lea Huber; Alexandre Balmer | Germany (GER); Leon Kaiser; Lars Gräter; Nina Benz; Finja Lipp; Ronja Eibl; Niklas Schehl |
| 2021 UCI Mountain Bike World Championships – XCO/XCC/XCR/DHI/E-MTB/4X; Italy 25–29 August | 4X | Tomáš Slavík; Czech Republic; Michaela Hájková; Czech Republic | Adrien Loron; France; Mathilde Bernard; France | Hannes Slavik; Austria; Anna Sara Rojas; Bolivia |
| 2021 UCI Mountain Bike World Championships – XCO/XCC/XCR/DHI/E-MTB/4X; Italy 25–29 August | Downhill | Greg Minnaar; South Africa; Myriam Nicole; France | Benoît Coulanges; France; Marine Cabirou; France | Troy Brosnan; Australia; Camille Balanche; Switzerland |
| 2021 UCI Mountain Bike World Championships – XCO/XCC/XCR/DHI/E-MTB/4X; Italy 25–29 August | Downhill Junior | Jackson Goldstone; Canada; Izabela Yankova; Bulgaria | Jordan Williams; Great Britain; Kine Haugom; Norway | Lachlan Stevens-Mcnab; New Zealand; Gracey Hemstreet; Canada |
| 2021 UCI Mountain Bike World Championships – XCO/XCC/XCR/DHI/E-MTB/4X; Italy 25–29 August | E-MTB | Jérôme Gilloux; France; Nicole Göldi; Switzerland | Hugo Pigeon; France; Laura Charles; France | Christopher Blevins; United States; Sofia Wiedenroth; Germany |
| 2021 UCI Mountain Bike World Championships – XCO/XCC/XCR/DHI/E-MTB/4X; Italy 25–29 August | XCO | Nino Schurter; Switzerland; Evie Richards; Great Britain | Mathias Flückiger; Switzerland; Anne Terpstra; Netherlands | Victor Koretzky; France; Sina Frei; Switzerland |
| 2021 UCI Mountain Bike World Championships – XCO/XCC/XCR/DHI/E-MTB/4X; Italy 25–29 August | XCO U23 | Martín Vidaurre; Chile; Mona Mitterwallner; Austria | Juri Zanotti; Italy; Laura Stigger; Austria | Joel Roth; Switzerland; Caroline Bohé; Denmark |
| 2021 UCI Mountain Bike World Championships – XCO/XCC/XCR/DHI/E-MTB/4X; Italy 25–29 August | XCO Junior | Adrien Boichis; France; Line Burquier; France | Camilo Andrés Gómez Gómez; Colombia; Olivia Onesti; France | Nils Aebersold; Switzerland; Sara Cortinovis; Italy |
| 2021 UCI Mountain Bike World Championships – XCO/XCC/XCR/DHI/E-MTB/4X; Italy 25–29 August | XCC | Christopher Blevins; United States; Sina Frei; Switzerland | Henrique Avancini; Brazil; Evie Richards; Great Britain | Maximilian Brandl; Germany; Pauline Ferrand-Prévot; France |
| 2021 UCI Mountain Bike World Championships – XCO/XCC/XCR/DHI/E-MTB/4X; Italy 25–29 August | XCR | France (FRA); Mathis Azzaro; Adrien Boichis; Léna Gérault; Tatiana Tournut; Line Burquier; Jordan Sarrou | United States (USA); Christopher Blevins; Brayden Johnson; Savilia Blunk; Ruth Holcomb; Kate Courtney; Riley Amos | Germany (GER); Leon Kaiser; Paul Schehl; Sina van Thiel; Nina Benz; Ronja Eibl; Luca Schwarzbauer |
| UCI World Championships – XCE; Austria 5 September | XCE | Simon Gegenheimer (GER); Gaia Tormena (ITA) | Jeroen van Eck (NED); Noémie Garnier (FRA) | Anton Olstam (SWE); Iryna Popova (UKR) |
| American Continental Championships – DHI; Brazil 24–26 September | DHI | Leonardo Becher da Silva (BRA); Mariana Salazar (ESA) | Camilo Sánchez Salazar (COL); Bruna Ulrich (BRA) | Gabriel Camargo Giovannini (BRA); Nara Faria da Silva (BRA) |
| UCI World Championships – XCM; Italy 2 October | XCM | Andreas Seewald (GER); Mona Mitterwallner (AUT) | Diego Arias (COL); Maja Włoszczowska (POL) | José Dias (POR); Natalia Fischer (ESP) |
| American Continental Championships – XCM; Chile 12 November | XCM | Luis Matías Delgado Moreira (CHI); Paz Leiva (CHI) | Rafael Eguiguren (CHI); Evelyn Muñoz Jaramillo (CHI) | Patricio Campbell Vilches (CHI); Bárbara Hernández Osses (CHI) |
| MTB Central American Championships XCO; Panama 10–12 December | XCO | Carlos Herrera Arroyo (CRC); Milagro Mena (CRC) | José Pablo Solano Murillo (CRC); Isabella Meneses Gómez (CRC) | Josué Mauricio Arana (ESA); Valeska Domínguez (PAN) |
| European Championships – XCO Beachrace; France 12 December | XCO Beachrace | Samuel Leroux (FRA); Pauliena Rooijakkers (NED) | Nicolas Miccoli (FRA); Riejanne Markus (NED) | Rick van Breda (NED); Rozanne Slik (NED) |
