= Oleksandr Hudyma (cyclist) =

Ukrainian cyclist (born 2003)

Personal information
- Born: 11 February 2003 (age 23) Rivne, Ukraine

Cycling career
- Sport: Cycling
- Discipline: Mountain bike
Medal record
Representing Ukraine
Men's mountain bike racing
European Junior and U23 Championships
Gold medal – first place	2021 Novi Sad	Junior Cross-country
Bronze medal – third place	2024 Cheile Grădiștei	U23 Cross-country short track

Oleksandr Hudyma (Ukrainian: Олександр Андрійович Гудима; born 11 February 2003 in Rivne, Ukraine) is a Ukrainian mountain biker. He qualified for the 2024 Summer Olympics. He is medallist of Junior and U23 European Championships.

== Major results ==
2021
2nd Albstadt
2022
3rd U23 World Cup in Petrópolis
3rd XCO Vrtojba 2022
3rd 24. Kamniski Kros – SloXcup in Kamnik
2023
2nd Greek MTB Series – Salamina Epic Race #4 in Salamis
3rd Grand Prix Banja Luka
2nd Grand Prix Bihać
2024
2nd Kizilalan MTB Cup in Antalya
2nd Cyprus Sunshine Cup #1 in Amathus
1st Cyprus Sunshine Cup #2 in Tochni
2nd Cyprus Sunshine Cup #3 in Macheras
1st Aydın MTB Cup
2nd Csömör Cup
