= UCI Urban Cycling World Championships – Women's cross-country eliminator =

The women's cross-country eliminator (XCE) is an event at the annual UCI Urban Cycling World Championships. From 2012 to 2016 the UCI world championships in the XCE were held as part of the UCI Mountain Bike & Trials World Championships.

== Medalists ==
Championships	Gold	Silver	Bronze
2012 Leogang-Saalfelden	Alexandra Engen; Sweden	Jolanda Neff; Switzerland	Aleksandra Dawidowicz; Poland
2013 Pietermaritzburg	Alexandra Engen; Sweden	Jolanda Neff; Switzerland	Linda Indergand; Switzerland
2014 Lillehammer/Hafjell	Kathrin Stirnemann; Switzerland	Linda Indergand; Switzerland	Ingrid Boe Jacobsen; Norway
2015 Vallnord	Linda Indergand; Switzerland	Ingrid Boe Jacobsen; Norway	Kathrin Stirnemann; Switzerland
2016 Nové Město	Linda Indergand; Switzerland	Kathrin Stirnemann; Switzerland	Ramona Forchini; Switzerland
2017 Chengdu	Kathrin Stirnemann; Switzerland	Ella Holmegard; Sweden	Perrine Clauzel; France
2018 Chengdu	Coline Clauzure; France	Iryna Popova; Ukraine	Marion Fromberger; Germany
2019 Waregem	Gaia Tormena; Italy	Isaure Medde; France	Coline Clauzure; France
2020 Leuven	Isaure Medde; France	Gaia Tormena; Italy	Fem van Empel; Netherlands
2021 Graz	Gaia Tormena; Italy	Noémie Garnier; France	Iryna Popova; Ukraine
2022 Barcelona	Gaia Tormena; Italy	Coline Clauzure; France	Ella Holmegård; Sweden
2023 Palangkaraya	Gaia Tormena; Italy	Dara Latifah; Indonesia	Annemoon van Dienst; Netherlands
2024 Aalen	Gaia Tormena; Italy	Lia Schrievers; Germany	Marion Fromberger; Germany
2025 Sakarya	Mariia Sukhopalova; Ukraine	Isaure Medde; France	Maria Sherstiuk; Ukraine
2026 Barcelona	Gaia Tormena; Italy	Mariia Sukhopalova; Ukraine	Margaux Borrelly; France

=== Medals by country ===
Rank	Nation	Gold	Silver	Bronze	Total
1	Italy	6	1	0	7
2	Switzerland	4	4	3	11
3	France	2	4	3	9
4	Sweden	2	1	1	4
5	Ukraine	1	2	2	5
6	Germany	0	1	2	3
7	Norway	0	1	1	2
8	Indonesia	0	1	0	1
9	Netherlands	0	0	2	2
10	Poland	0	0	1	1
Totals (10 entries)		15	15	15	45
