= Knut Røhme =

Norwegian mountain biker (born 1999)

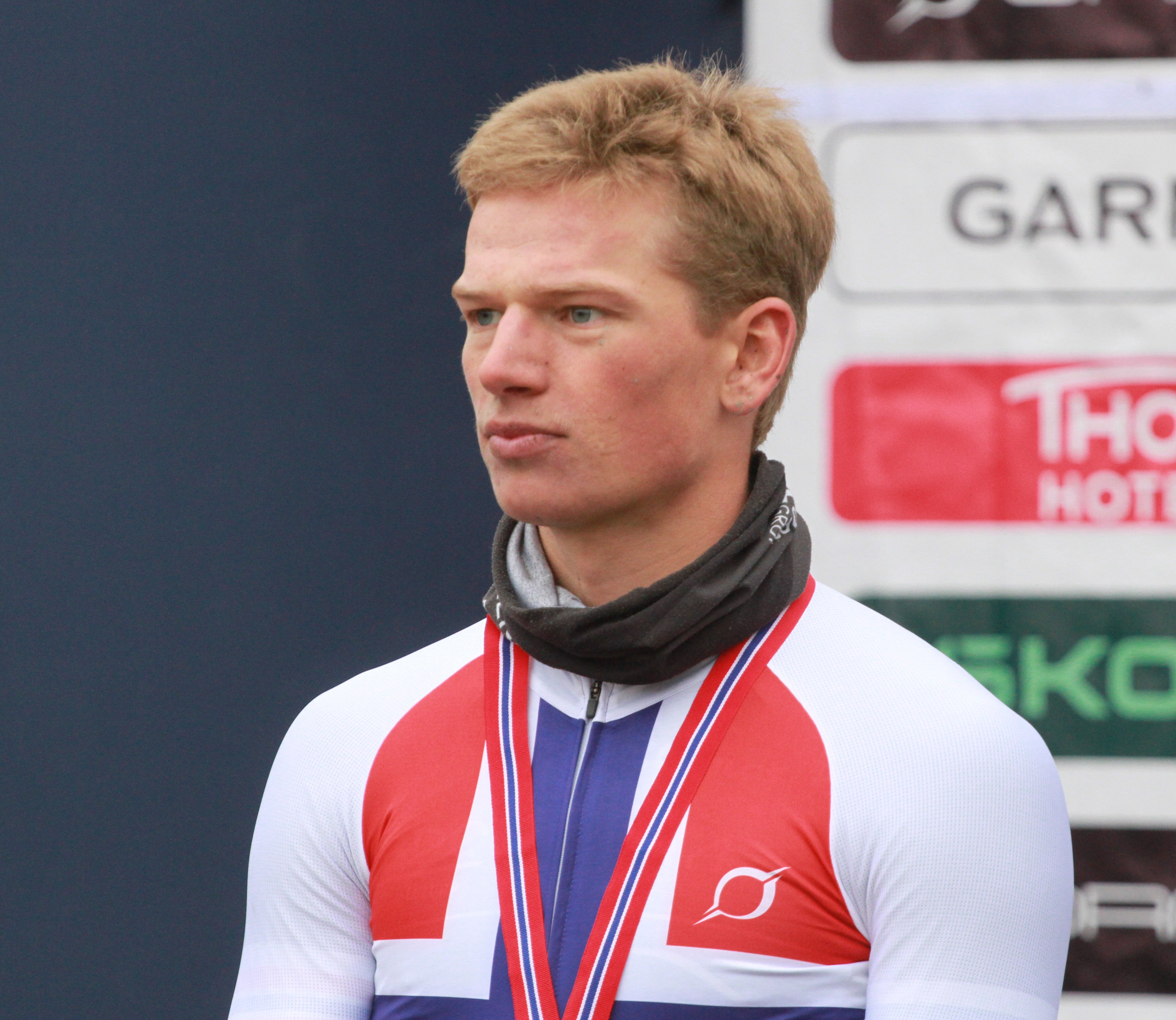
- Røhme in 2023

Personal information
- Born: 25 September 1999 (age 27)

Cycling career
- Sport: Cycling
- Current team: Cube Factory Racing
- Disciplines: Mountain bike; Cyclo-cross
- Role: Rider

Professional teams
- 2018–2019: Team Sørensen Racing
- 2024–: Cube Factory Racing

Knut Røhme (born 25 September 1999) is a Norwegian mountain biker and cyclo-cross cyclist. He rode in the cross-country event at the 2024 Summer Olympics, where he finished 20th.

== Major results ==
=== Mountain bike ===
2020
National Championships

2nd Cross-country
3rd Cross-country short track

2021
National Championships

2nd Cross-country marathon
2nd Cross-country short track
3rd Cross-country

2022
National Championships

1st Cross-country marathon
2nd Cross-country short track

2023
1st Cross-country, National Championships
2024
National Championships

1st Cross-country
1st Cross-country short track

=== Cyclo-cross ===
2021–2022
3rd National Championships
3rd Føyka Day 2
2022–2023
2nd National Championships
