= Adéla Holubová =

Czech mountain biker

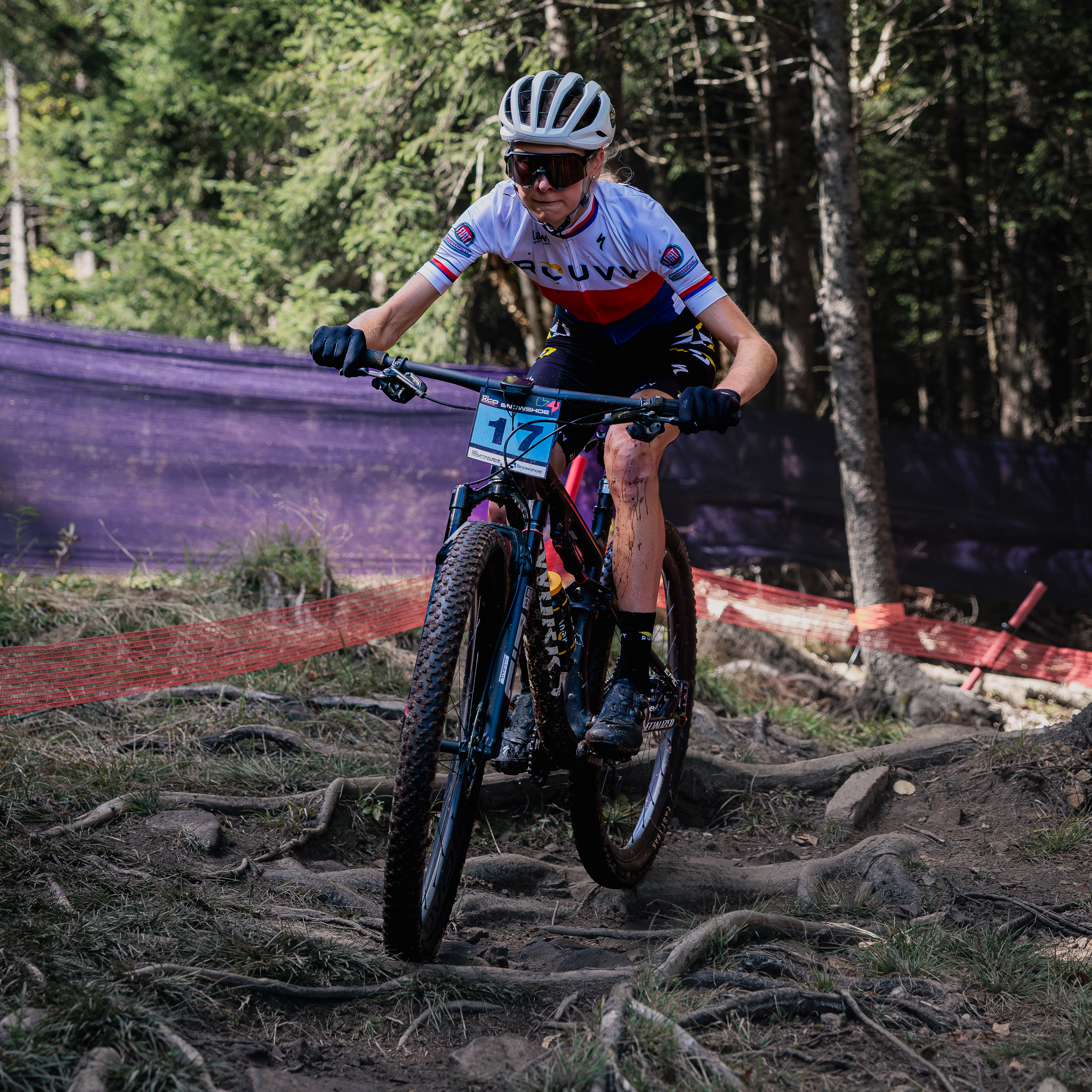

Personal information
- Born: 27 August 2002 (age 24) Plzeň, Czech Republic

Cycling career
- Sport: Cycling
- Discipline: Mountain biking

Adéla Holubová (born 27 August 2002) is a Czech mountain biker. She competed in the women's cross-country event at the 2024 Summer Olympics.

== Major results ==
2022
2nd Cross-country, National Under-23 Championships
2023
National Under-23 Championships

1st Cross-country
1st Cross-country short track
