= Erik Hægstad =

Norwegian cyclist (born 1996)

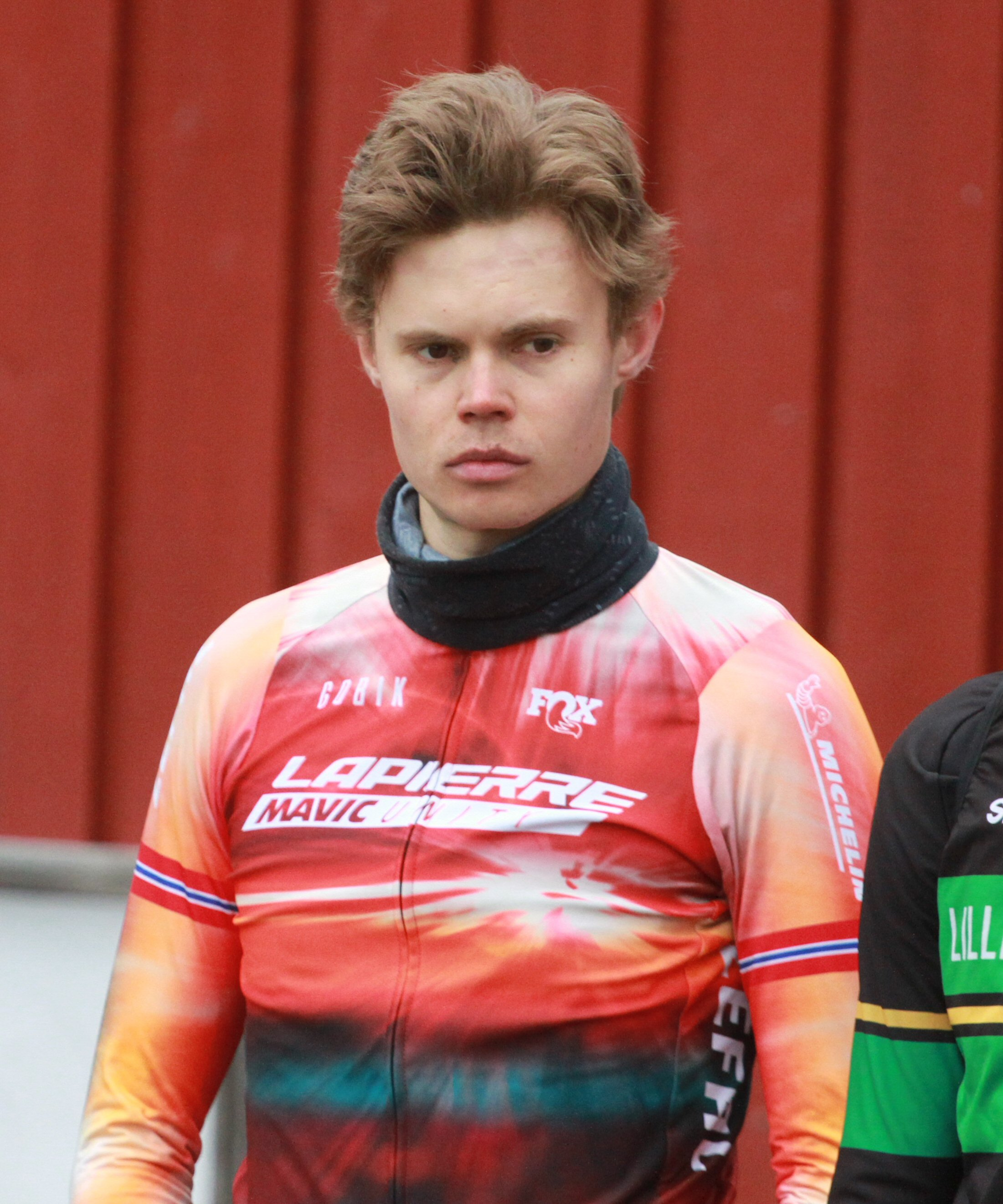
- Hægstad inn 2024

Personal information
- Born: 26 December 1996 (age 29) Drammen, Norway
- Height: 185 cm (6 ft 1 in)

Cycling career
- Sport: Cycling
- Current team: Lillehammer CK
- Discipline: Mountain bike
- Role: Rider
- Rider type: Cross-country

Erik Hægstad (born 26 December 1996) is a Norwegian cross-country mountain biker, born in Drammen. He qualified to represent Norway at the 2020 Summer Olympics in Tokyo 2021, competing in men's cross-country.

== Major results ==
2019
1st National XCO Championships
2021
1st National XCO Championships
