= Hildegunn Gjertrud Hovdenak =

Norwegian cyclist

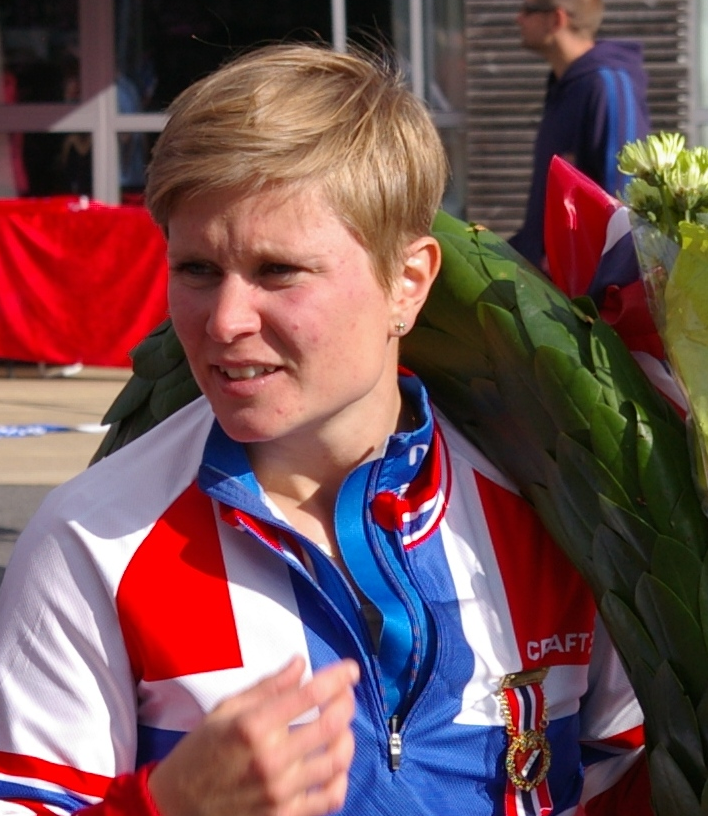

Personal information
- Born: 11 August 1985 (age 41)

Cycling career
- Sport: Cycling
- Role: Rider

Hildegunn Gjertrud Hovdenak (born 11 August 1985) is a Norwegian racing cyclist. In 2012, she won the Norwegian National Road Race Championship.
