= Angelika Tazreiter =

Austrian cyclist

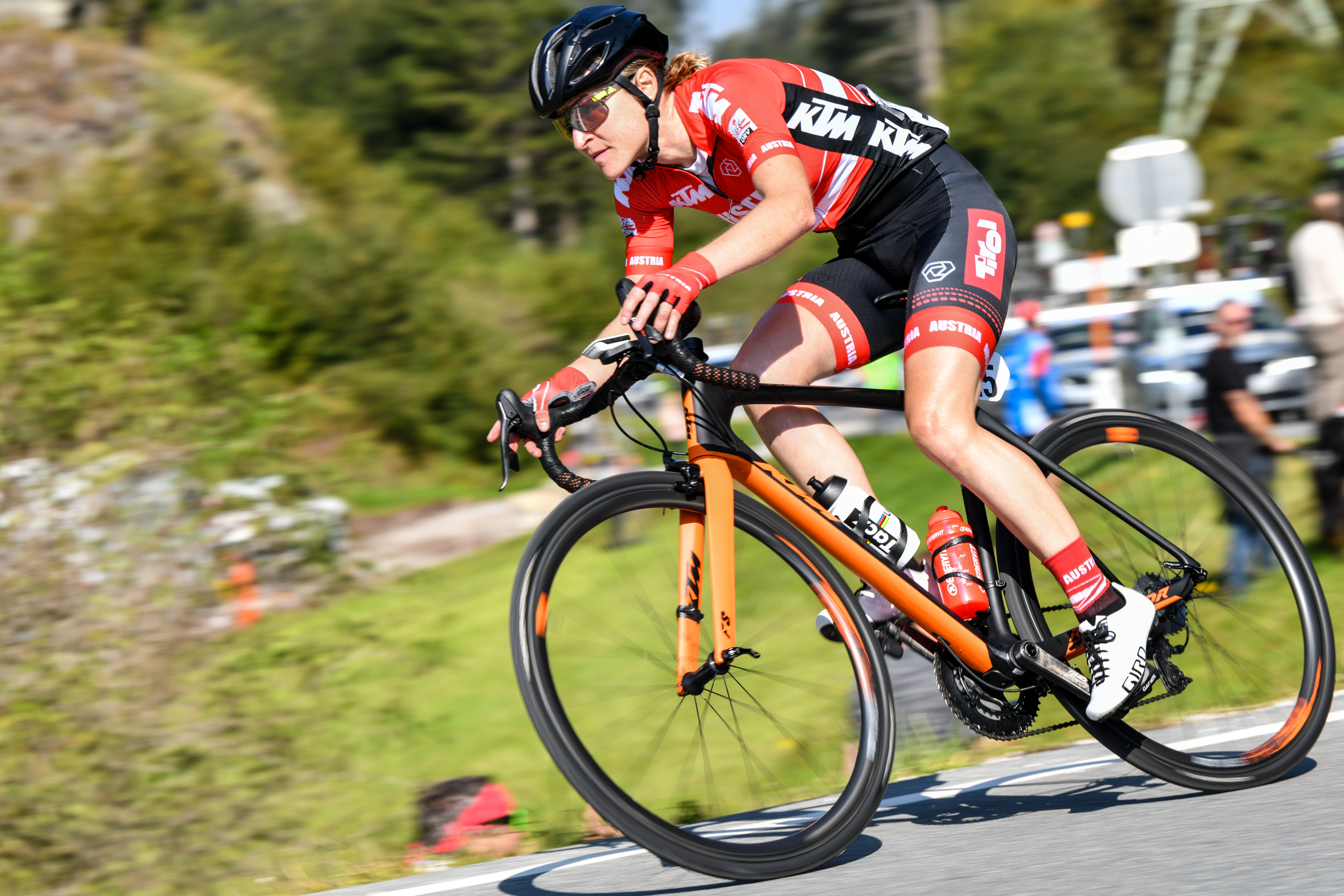
- Tazreiter at the 2018 World Championships

Personal information
- Born: 18 July 1987 (age 39)

Cycling career
- Sport: Cycling
- Role: Rider

Angelika Tazreiter (born 18 July 1987) is an Austrian racing cyclist. She rode in the women's road race event at the 2018 UCI Road World Championships.

== Major results ==
2018
3rd Road race, National Road Championships
2019
2nd Road race, National Road Championships
