= Bartłomiej Wawak =

Polish cyclist (born 1993)

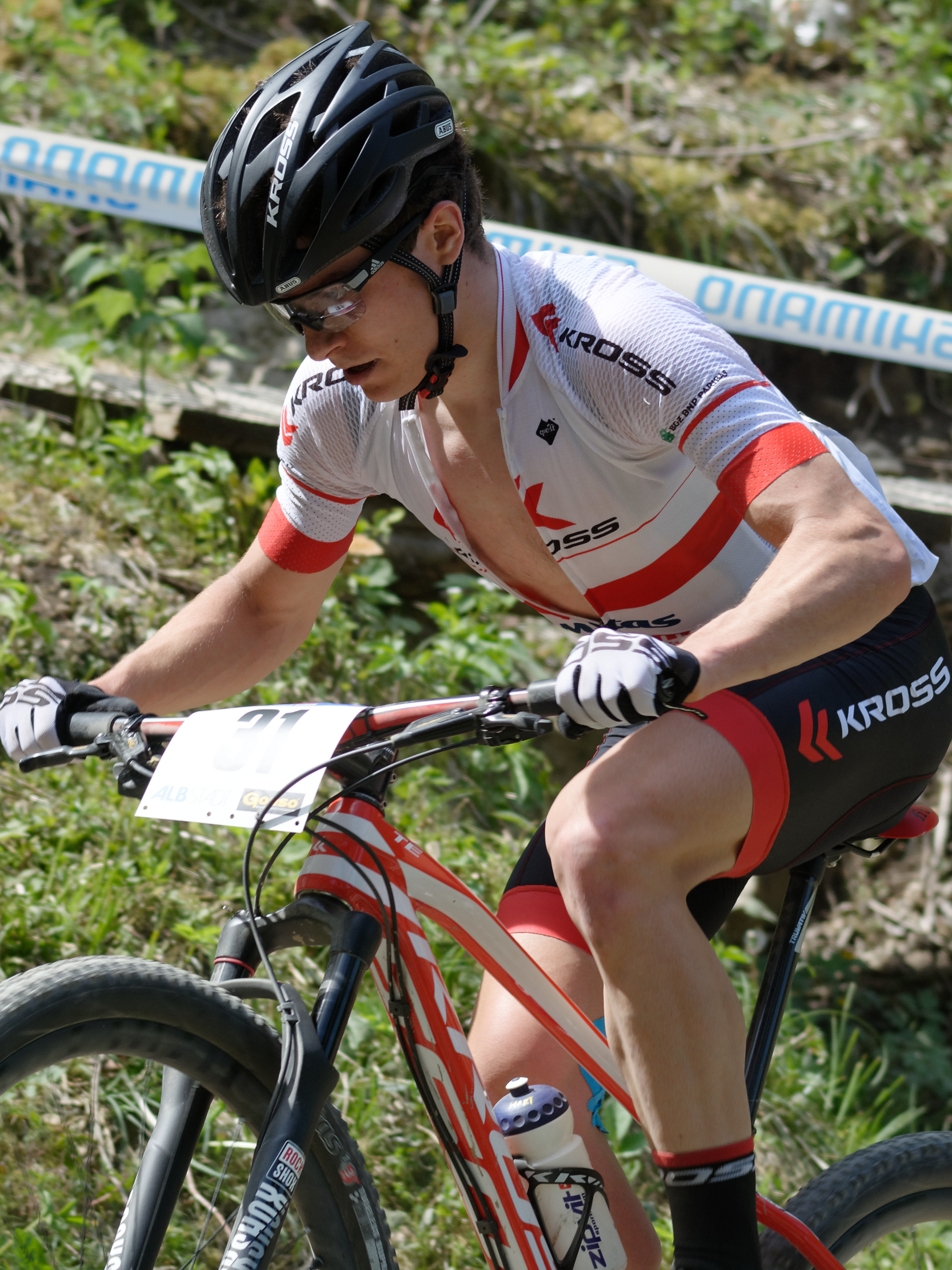
- Wawak in 2017

Personal information
- Born: 25 August 1993 (age 33) Bielsko-Biała, Poland

Cycling career
- Sport: Cycling
- Current team: Kross Orlen Racing Team
- Discipline: Mountain bike
- Role: Rider
- Rider type: Cross-country

Amateur team
- 2005–2009: ULKS Victoria Kozy

Professional teams
- 2009–2014: JBG2 Professional MTB Team
- 2015–2018: Kross Racing Team
- 2019: Volkswagen Commercial Vehicles MTB Team
- 2020–: Kross Racing Team

Bartłomiej Wawak (born 25 August 1993) is a Polish cross-country mountain biker, who currently rides for the Kross Orlen Racing Team. He competed in the cross-country race at the 2020 Summer Olympics.

== Major results ==
2013
1st Marathon, UEC European Under-23 Championships
2014
2nd Cross-country, National Championships
2015
2nd Cross-country, National Championships
2016
1st Cross-country, National Championships
2018
1st Cross-country, National Championships
2019
1st Cross-country, National Championships
2020
2nd Cross-country, National Championships
2021
1st Cross-country short course, National Championships
2022
National Championships

1st Cross-country
2nd Cross-country short course
