= Léandre Bouchard =

Canadian cyclist (born 1992)

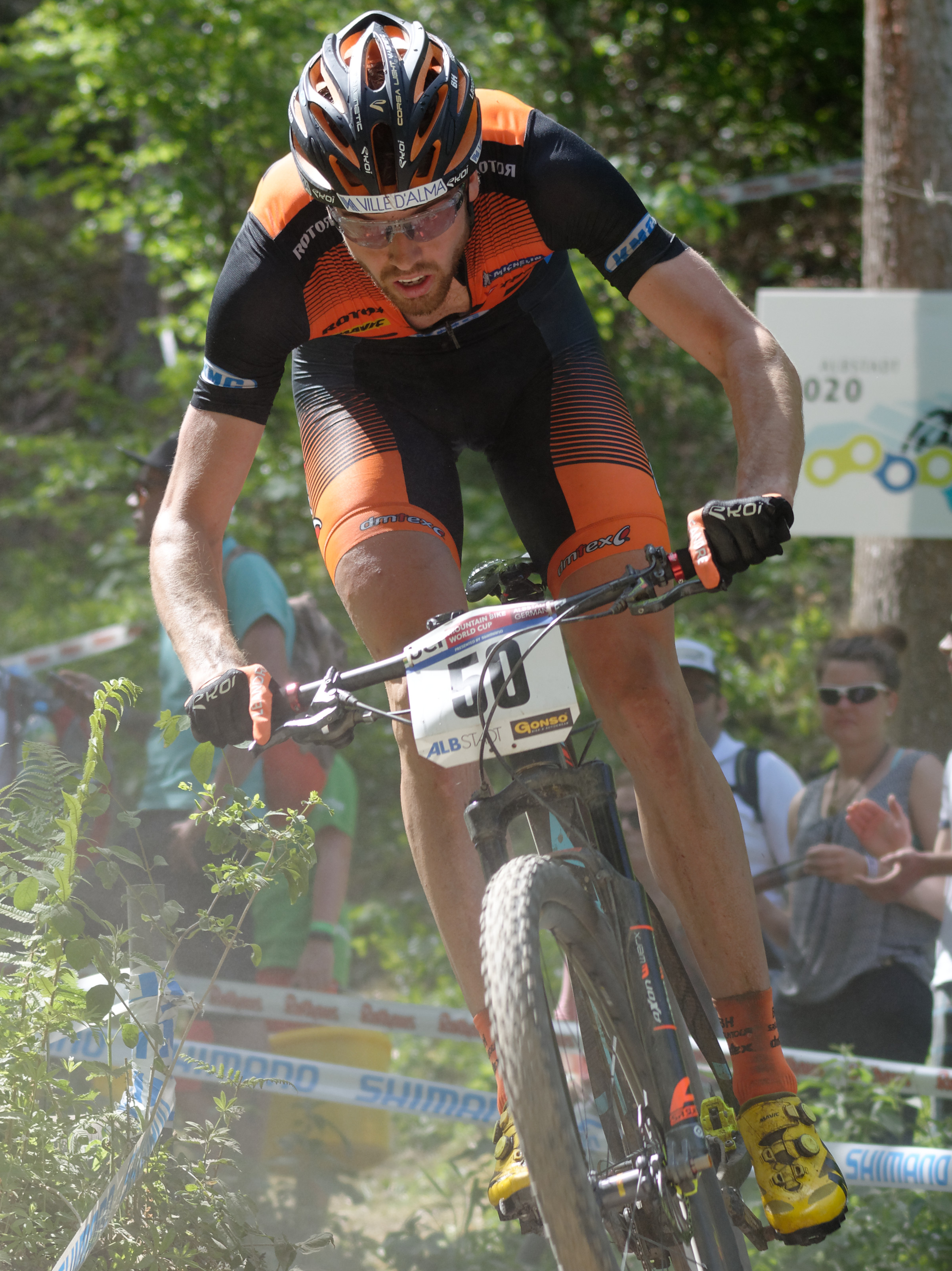
- Léandre Bouchard, 2017 in Albstadt

Personal information
- Born: 20 October 1992 (age 33) Alma, Quebec, Canada
- Height: 1.93 m (6 ft 4 in)
- Weight: 81 kg (179 lb)

Cycling career
- Sport: Cycling
- Discipline: Mountain bike
- Role: Rider
- Rider type: Cross-country

Professional team
- 2015–2017: Transports Lacombe/Devinci

Léandre Bouchard (born October 20, 1992, in Alma, Quebec) is a Canadian cross-country mountain biker.

== Career ==
Bouchard competed in the U23 category until 2014, finishing 8th at the U23 World Championships. In 2015 he started competing as a full elite rider. In 2016, he was named to Canada's Olympic team.

In 2024, Léandre participated in the Mont Saint-Anne Mountain Bike World Cup and finished 21st, about 4 minutes after the champion.
