= Reto Indergand =

Swiss cyclist (born 1991)

Personal information
- Born: 15 December 1991 (age 34) Altdorf, Switzerland
- Height: 1.74 m (5 ft 9 in)
- Weight: 65 kg (143 lb)

Cycling career
- Sport: Cycling
- Current team: BMC Mountainbike Racing Team
- Discipline: Mountain bike
- Role: Rider
- Rider type: Cross-country

Professional teams
- 2010: FRM-TG Zentralschweiz
- 2011: MK-Zentralschweiz
- 2012–: BMC Mountainbike Racing Team

Reto Indergand (born 15 December 1991 in Altdorf) is a Swiss cyclist riding for the BMC Mountainbike Racing Team. He was on the start list for the 2018 Cross-country European Championship and he finished 5th.

== Major results ==
2013
1st Cross-country, National Under-23 Championships
2015
2nd Team relay, UEC European Championships
2016
1st Overall Swiss Epic (with Lukas Flückiger)
Swiss Bike Cup

1st Buchs

2017
Swiss Bike Cup

1st Andermatt
