= Emeline Detilleux =

Belgian mountain biker

Personal information
- Born: 8 November 1999 (age 26)

Cycling career
- Sport: Cycling
- Discipline: Mountain biking

Emeline Detilleux (born 8 November 1999) is a Belgian mountain biker. She competed in the women's cross-country event at the 2024 Summer Olympics.

== Major results ==
2018
3rd Cross-country, National Championships
2021
1st Cross-country, National Championships
2022
1st Cross-country, National Championships
2023
National Championships

1st Cross-country
1st Cross-country short track

2025
National Championships

1st Cross-country
1st Cross-country short track
