= Elina Sofokleous =

Cypriot cyclist (born 1978)

Personal information
- Born: 1 November 1978 (age 47)

Cycling career
- Sport: Cycling

Elina Sofokleous (born 1 November 1978) is a Cypriot cyclist. She competed in the women's cross-country mountain biking event at the 2004 Summer Olympics.
