= Iryna Popova =

Ukrainian cross-country mountain biker

Personal information
- Full name: Iryna Popova
- Born: 27 May 1991 (age 35) Horlivka, Ukrainian SSR, Soviet Union

Cycling career
- Sport: Cycling
- Discipline: Mountain bike racing
- Role: Rider
- Rider type: Cross-country
Medal record
Representing Ukraine
Women's mountain bike racing
Urban Cycling World Championships
| Silver medal – second place | 2018 Chengdu | Mountain bike eliminator |
World Championships
| Bronze medal – third place | 2021 Graz | Mountain bike eliminator |
European Championships
| Gold medal – first place | 2016 Huskvarna | Cross-country eliminator |
| Gold medal – first place | 2018 Stattegg | Cross-country eliminator |
| Bronze medal – third place | 2021 Novi Sad | Cross-country eliminator |

Iryna Popova is a Ukrainian cross-country mountain biker She is 2016 European champion in women's cross-country eliminator race.
