= 2025 UCI Mountain Bike season =

Mountain Bike season

Details
- Dates: 11 January
- Location: World

The 2025 UCI Mountain Bike season is the 20th season of the UCI Mountain Bike season. The 2025 season began on 11 January with three competitions in Israel, Lesotho and New Zealand and ends in December 2025.

== Events ==
=== January ===
Date	Race Name	Location	Class	Winner	Second	Third	Ref
11 January	National MTB Series - Round 1	(New Zealand) Dunedin	CS	Anton Cooper (NZL); Sammie Maxwell (NZL)	Ben Oliver (NZL); Rebecca Henderson (AUS)	Sam Fox (AUS); Mary Gray (NZL)	
11 January	National Cup Race 1	(Israel) Mishmar HaEmek	2	Tomer Zaltsman (ISR); Na'ama Noyman (ISR)	Nir Tchwella (ISR); Munira Yasin (ISR)	Tomer Caspi (ISR); Zohar Bar Joseph (ISR)	
14–15 January	Thailand Mountain Bike Cup	(Thailand) Kanchanaburi	1	Riki Kitabayashi (JPN); Sayu Bella Sukma Dewi (INA)	Zaenal Fanani (INA); Shagne Paula Yaoyao (PHI)	Feri Yudoyono (INA); Thanaporn Haman (THA)	
18 January	Momentum Medical Scheme Attakwas Extreme	(South Africa) Oudtshoorn	1	Alan Hatherly (RSA); Samantha Sanders (RSA)	Tristan Nortje (RSA); Hayley Preen (RSA)	Arno du Toit (RSA); Sarah Hill (RSA)	
18–19 January	National MTB Series - Round 2	(New Zealand) Queenstown	CS	Rónán Dunne (IRL); Jenna Hastings (NZL)	Lachlan Stevens-McNab (NZL); Sacha Earnest (NZL)	Tuhoto-Ariki Pene (NZL); Bailey Goldstone (CAN)	
30 January – 2 February	Club La Santa 4 Stage MTB Lanzarote - XCMS	(Spain) Lanzarote	S1	Tim Smeenge (NED); Tessa Kortekaas (NED)	Luis León Sánchez (ESP); Puck Pinxt (NED)	Sebastian Gesche (CHI); Janka Keseg Števková (SVK)	
30 January – 2 February	IV La Leyenda de Tartessos - XCMS	(Spain) El Rompido	S2	David Valero (ESP); Mónica Calderon (COL)	Tiago Ferreira (POR); Irina Lützelschwab (SUI)	José María Sánchez Ruiz (ESP); Janina Wüst (SUI)	
30 January – 2 February	Costa Blanca Bike Race - CBBR - XCMS	(Spain) Calpe	S2	Eskil Evensen-Lie (NOR); Terese Andersson (SWE)	Emil Hasund Eid (NOR); Amanda Bohlin (SWE)	Krzysztof Łukasik (POL); Chrystelle Baumann (SUI)	
31 January – 2 February	Copa Internacional UCI Specialized-Rio Cruces Valdivia	(Chile) Valdivia	CS	Martín Vidaurre (CHI) (XCC); Catalina Vidaurre (CHI) (XCC); Martín Vidaurre (CHI) (XCO); Catalina Vidaurre (CHI) (XCO)	José Gabriel Marques (BRA) (XCC); Yarela González (CHI) (XCC); Alex Malacarne (BRA) (XCO); Raiza Goulão (BRA) (XCO)	Alex Malacarne (BRA) (XCC); Ines Carolina Gutiérrez (ARG) (XCC); Gustavo Xavier Oliveira Pereira (BRA) (XCO); Yarela González (CHI) (XCO)	

=== February ===
Date	Race Name	Location	Class	Winner	Second	Third	Ref
2 February	Copa Ecedao	(Puerto Rico) Salinas	2	Tyler Orschel (CAN); Suheily Rodríguez (PUR)	Georwill Pérez Román (PUR); Ana María Roa (COL)	Jacob Morales Ortega (PUR); Ileana Martinez Bermudez (PUR)	
2 February	Copa Catalana Internacional Biking Point - Sant Fruitós de Bages	(Spain) Sant Fruitós de Bages	3	Tom Schellekens (NED); Savilia Blunk (USA)	Cristofer Bosque Ruano (ESP); Kelsey Urban (USA)	Mario Sinués Micó (ESP); Núria Bosch Picó (ESP)	
6–9 February	Momentum Medical Scheme Tankwa Trek	(South Africa) Ceres	SHC	Marco Joubert (RSA); Tristan Nortje (RSA); Candice Lill (RSA); Kate Courtney (USA)	Simon Stiebjahn (GER); Martin Frey (GER); Greta Seiwald (ITA); Martina Berta (ITA)	Daniel van der Walt (RSA); Ursin Spescha (SUI); Tyler Jacobs (RSA); Sara Cortinovis (ITA)	
6–9 February	Mediterranean Epic MTB - XCMS	(Spain) Oropesa del Mar	SHC	Wout Alleman (BEL); Rosa van Doorn (NED)	Charlie Aldridge (GBR); Janina Wüst (SUI)	Eskil Evensen-Lie (NOR); Chrystelle Baumann (SUI)	
7–8 February	Red Bull Hardline Tasmania	(Australia) Maydena	3	Jackson Goldstone (CAN); Gracey Hemstreet (CAN)	Asa Vermette (USA)	Troy Brosnan (AUS)	
7–9 February	Copa Internacional UCI Armada de Chile Talcahuano	(Chile) Talcahuano	1	Martín Vidaurre (CHI) (XCC); Raiza Goulão (BRA) (XCC); Martín Vidaurre (CHI) (XCO); Raiza Goulão (BRA) (XCO)	Fernando Contreras (ARG) (XCC); Catalina Vidaurre (CHI) (XCC); Agustín Durán (ARG) (XCO); Catalina Vidaurre (CHI) (XCO)	Agustín Durán (ARG) (XCC); Yarela González (CHI) (XCC); Fernando Contreras (ARG) (XCO); Yarela González (CHI) (XCO)	
8 February	National Cup Race 2	(Israel) Mishmar HaEmek	2	Tomer Zaltsman (ISR); Na'ama Noyman (ISR)	Nir Tchwella (ISR); Talia Ish Shalom (ISR)	Yoav Lifshitz (ISR); Romi Veldnizki (ISR)	
8–9 February	Shimano Supercup Massi La Nucía	(Spain) La Nucia	1	Sam Gaze (NZL); Tamara Wiedmann (AUT)	Maximilian Brandl (GER); Rebecca Henderson (AUS)	David Valero (ESP); Jolanda Neff (SUI)	
14–16 February	Crankworx Christchurch Downhill	(New Zealand) Christchurch	CS	Lachlan Stevens-McNab (NZL); Jenna Hastings (NZL)	Bernard Kerr (GBR); Mille Johnset (NOR)	Tegan Cruz (CAN); Louise-Anna Ferguson (GBR)	
15–16 February	Costa Rica Open Downhill	(Costa Rica) Cartago	CS	Evan Medcalf (USA); Florencia Rodriguez Contardo (CHI)	Alden Pate (USA)	Christopher Grice (USA)	
15–16 February	Internacionales Chelva	(Spain) Chelva	HC	Charlie Aldridge (GBR); Jenny Rissveds (SWE)	David List (GER); Kelsey Urban (USA)	Leon Kaiser (GER); Evie Richards (GBR)	
16 February	Antalya MTB Cup	(Turkey) Antalya	1	Antoine Jamin (BEL); Mariia Sukhopalova (UKR)	Théo Demarcin (BEL); Tatyana Geneleva (KAZ)	Clément Horny (BEL); Azize Bekar (TUR)	
19 February	Tropical MTB Challenge - 2	(Puerto Rico) Salinas	CS	Tyler Orschel (CAN); Gwendalyn Gibson (USA)	Léandre Bouchard (CAN); Ella MacPhee (CAN)	Carter Woods (CAN); Laurie Arseneault (CAN)	
21–23 February	Tropical Mountain Bike Challenge	(Puerto Rico) Salinas	HC	Carter Woods (CAN) (XCC); Gwendalyn Gibson (USA) (XCC); Léandre Bouchard (CAN) (XCO); Gwendalyn Gibson (USA) (XCO)	Raphael Auclair (CAN) (XCC); Laurie Arseneault (CAN) (XCC); Tyler Orschel (CAN) (XCO); Ella MacPhee (CAN) (XCO)	Jack Spranger (USA) (XCC); Bailey Cioppa (USA) (XCC); Carter Woods (CAN) (XCO); Laurie Arseneault (CAN) (XCO)	
22–23 February	Shimano Supercup Massi Banyoles	(Spain) Banyoles	CS	Lars Forster (SUI); Jolanda Neff (SUI)	Charlie Aldridge (GBR); Ana Santos (POR)	Victor Koretzky (FRA); Flavie Guille (FRA)	
23 February	Abierto Argentino XCO	(Argentina) Comodoro Rivadavia	2	Agustín Durán (ARG); Agustina Antonella Quirós (ARG)	Juan Ignacio Goudailliez (ARG); Macarena Quiroz (ARG)	Jorge Álvaro Macias (ARG)	
23 February	Western Cape XCO Cup 1	(South Africa) Paarl	2	Filippo Colombo (SUI); Emilly Johnston (CAN)	Andri Frischknecht (SUI); Faranak Partoazar (IRI)	Michael Foster (RSA); Lilian Baber (RSA)	
24 February – 1 March	Andalucía Bike Race by Garmin - XCMS	(Spain) Granada, Jaén, Córdoba	SHC	Fabian Rabensteiner (ITA); Casey South (SUI); Mónica Calderon (COL); Tessa Kortekaas (NED)	Andreas Seewald (GER); Jakob Hartmann (GER); Meritxell Figueras (ESP); Claudia Peretti (ITA)	Luis Francisco Pérez Martínez (ESP); Miguel Muñoz Moreno (ESP); Antonia Daubermann (GER); Daniela Höfler (GER)	
28 February	Greek MTB Series by Alter Bike Tours- Salamina Epic Race #1	(Greece) Salamis Island	1	Tomer Zaltsman (ISR); Candice Lill (RSA)	Mario Bair (AUT); Grace Inglis (GBR)	Jofre Cullell (ESP); Noëlle Buri (SUI)	
28 February	National Cup Race 3	(Israel) Lahav	2	Guy Beer (ISR); Na'ama Noyman (ISR)	Tim Zhukov (ISR); Avigaelle Lowy Yabets (ISR)	Yoav Lifshitz (ISR); Talia Ish Shalom (ISR)	
28 February – 1 March	Puerto Rico MTB Cup	(Puerto Rico) Rincón	1	Carter Woods (CAN) (XCC); Gwendalyn Gibson (USA) (XCC); Léandre Bouchard (CAN) (XCO); Gwendalyn Gibson (USA) (XCO)	Raphael Auclair (CAN) (XCC); María Carolina Flores García (MEX) (XCC); Tyler Orschel (CAN) (XCO); Ella MacPhee (CAN) (XCO)	Léandre Bouchard (CAN) (XCC); Ella MacPhee (CAN) (XCC); Carter Woods (CAN) (XCO); Laurie Arseneault (CAN) (XCO)	

=== March ===
Date	Race Name	Location	Class	Winner	Second	Third	Ref
1 March	AusCycling MTB National Series	(Australia) Canberra	CS	Anton Cooper (NZL); Sammie Maxwell (NZL)	Jack Ward (AUS); Rebecca Henderson (AUS)	Brent Rees (AUS); Zoe Cuthbert (AUS)	
1 March	Hellenic National XCO Cup #1	(Greece) Salamis Island	2	Jofre Cullell (ESP); Carla Hahn (GER)	Jan Zatloukal (CZE); Yui Ishida (JPN)	Julius Scherrer (AUT); Eirini Maria Karousou (GRE)	
1 March	Verona MTB International	(Italy) Verona	2	Simone Avondetto (ITA); Greta Seiwald (ITA)	Luca Braidot (ITA); Giada Specia (ITA)	Filippo Fontana (ITA); Lucia Bramati (ITA)	
1–2 March	VTT Chabrières	(France) Guéret	1	Luca Schwarzbauer (GER); Léna Gérault (FRA)	Thomas Griot (FRA); Noémie Garnier (FRA)	Yannis Musy (FRA); Chrystelle Baumann (SUI)	
1–2 March	Portugal Cup XCO - Melgaço International XCO	(Portugal) Melgaço	1	Alix André-Gallis (FRA); Evie Richards (GBR)	Christopher Dawson (IRL); Madigan Munro (USA)	Roberto Ferreira (POR); Beatriz Guerra (POR)	
1–2 March	SA XCO Cup Series	(South Africa) Cape Town	1	Luke Moir (RSA) (XCC); Tyler Jacobs (RSA) (XCC); Luke Moir (RSA) (XCO); Alessandra Keller (SUI) (XCO)	Michael Foster (RSA) (XCC); Faranak Partoazar (IRI) (XCC); Michael Foster (RSA) (XCO); Tyler Jacobs (RSA) (XCO)	Johann van Zyl (RSA) (XCC); Riley Smith (RSA) (XCC); Johann van Zyl (RSA) (XCO); Faranak Partoazar (IRI) (XCO)	
1–2 March	Abierto Argentino de MTB	(Argentina) Ushuaïa	2	Agustín Durán (ARG); Agostina Melgarejo (ARG)	Juan Ignacio Goudailliez (ARG); Zoe Rocío Quevedo (ARG)	Jorge Álvaro Macías (ARG); Sofía Eliana García (ARG)	
1–2 March	Red Bull Valparaíso Cerro Abajo	(Chile) Valparaíso	3	Tomáš Slavík (CZE)	Felipe Agurto Galleguillos (CHI)	Lucas Borba (BRA)	
2 March	AusCycling MTB National Series	(Australia) Canberra	CS	Jack Ward (AUS) (XCO); Sammie Maxwell (NZL) (XCO); Jackson Frew (AUS) (DHI); Sian A'Hern (AUS) (XCO)	Anton Cooper (NZL) (XCO); Rebecca Henderson (AUS) (XCO); Jackson Connelly (AUS) (DHI); Sacha Mills (AUS) (DHI)	Scott Bowden (AUS) (XCO); Zoe Cuthbert (AUS) (XCO); Jed Stanton (AUS) (DHI); Ashleigh Weinert (AUS) (DHI)	
2 March	Greek MTB Series by Alter Bike Tours- Salamina Epic Race #2	(Greece) Salamis Island	1	Tobias Lillelund (DEN); Candice Lill (RSA)	Mario Bair (AUT); Grace Inglis (GBR)	Jofre Cullell (ESP); Noëlle Buri (SUI)	
2 March	Gran Premio Zaragoza XCO	(Spain) Zaragoza	1	Thibaut François Baudry (ESP); Janika Lõiv (EST)	Alberto Barroso (ESP); Núria Bosch Picó (ESP)	Raúl Villar Blanco (ESP); Estíbaliz Sagardoy (ESP)	
5–9 March	Crankworx Rotorua Downhill	(New Zealand) Rotorua	CS	Lachlan Stevens-McNab (NZL); Jenna Hastings (NZL)	Tuhoto-Ariki Pene (NZL); Camille Balanche (SUI)	Matt Walker (GBR); Louise-Anna Ferguson (GBR)	
6 March	Greek MTB Series by Alter Bike Tours- Salamina Epic Race #3	(Greece) Salamis Island	1	Tomer Zaltsman (ISR); Candice Lill (RSA)	Mario Bair (AUT); Grace Inglis (GBR)	Jarne Vandersteen (BEL); Lia Schrievers (GER)	
7–8 March	Internazionali Crosscountry Coppa Citta di Albenga	(Italy) Albenga	1	Nino Schurter (SUI); Martina Berta (ITA)	Ondřej Cink (CZE); Giada Specia (ITA)	Simone Avondetto (ITA); Sofie Heby Pedersen (DEN)	
7–9 March	#1 Desafio dos Gigantes XCC - XCM - XCO	(Brazil) Mariana	1	Gustavo Xavier de Oliveira (BRA) (XCC); Karen Olímpio (BRA) (XCC); Luiz Miguel Honório (BRA) (XCM); Karen Olímpio (BRA) (XCM); Ulan Bastos Galinski (BRA) (XCO); Karen Olímpio (BRA) (XCO)	Ulan Bastos Galinski (BRA) (XCC); Raiza Goulão (BRA) (XCC); Nicolas Rafhael Romão Machado (BRA) (XCM); Iara Caetano (BRA) (XCM); Alex Malacarne (BRA) (XCO); Raiza Goulão (BRA) (XCO)	José Gabriel Marques (BRA) (XCC); Isabella Lacerda (BRA) (XCC); Diogo Nascimento (BRA) (XCM); Lorena Marques Ferraz (BRA) (XCM); Jhonnatan Botero Villegas (COL) (XCO); Isabella Lacerda (BRA) (XCO)	
7–9 March	Copa Internacional UCI CMPC-Angol	(Chile) Angol	2	Nicolás Delich Pardo (CHI) (XCC); Catalina Vidaurre (CHI) (XCC); Ignacio Gallo Florido (CHI) (XCO); Catalina Vidaurre (CHI) (XCO)	Patricio Farías Díaz (CHI) (XCC); Yarela González (CHI) (XCC); Nicolás Delich Pardo (CHI) (XCO); Yarela González (CHI) (XCO)	Ignacio Gallo Florido (CHI) (XCC); Andrea Yuvancic Vargas (CHI) (XCC); Patricio Farías Díaz (CHI) (XCO); Andrea Yuvancic Vargas (CHI) (XCO)	
8 March	Orange Seal Pro Cup p/b Vailocity	(United States) Temecula	1	Christopher Blevins (USA); Kelsey Urban (USA)	Riley Amos (USA); Jennifer Jackson (CAN)	Carter Woods (CAN); Savilia Blunk (USA)	
8 March	Far West Race - XCM	(Spain) Calatayud	2	José María Sánchez Ruiz (ESP); Meritxell Figueras (ESP)	Paweł Bernas (POL); Pilar Fernández (ESP)	Vinzent Dorn (GER); Natalia Fischer (ESP)	
8–9 March	Greek MTB Series by Alter Bike Tours- Salamina Epic Race #4	(Greece) Salamis Island	HC	Joshua Dubau (FRA); Candice Lill (RSA)	Mario Bair (AUT); Lia Schrievers (GER)	Max Foidl (AUT); Grace Inglis (GBR)	
9 March	Coupe Auvergne Rhône Alpes	(France) Salavas	2	Loan Cheneval (FRA); Léna Gérault (FRA)	Alexandre Martins (FRA); Chrystelle Baumann (SUI)	Naël Rouffiac (FRA); Noémie Medina (FRA)	
9 March	Gran Premio Ciudad de Valladolid BTT XCO	(Spain) Valladolid	2	Alberto Barroso (ESP); Lucía Gómez Andreu (ESP)	Aniol Morell (ESP); Núria Bosch Picó (ESP)	Raúl Villar Blanco (ESP); Estíbaliz Sagardoy (ESP)	
14–16 March	Internacional MTB Series #1	(Brazil) Lavras	2	José Gabriel Marques (BRA) (XCC); Karen Olímpio (BRA) (XCC); Ulan Bastos Galinski (BRA) (XCO); Karen Olímpio (BRA) (XCO)	Ulan Bastos Galinski (BRA) (XCC); Ana Laura Oliveira Moraes (BRA) (XCC); Luiz Cocuzzi (BRA) (XCO); Isabella Lacerda (BRA) (XCO)	Adair Prieto (MEX) (XCC); Sabrina Oliveira (BRA) (XCC); Adair Prieto (MEX) (XCO); Sabrina Oliveira (BRA) (XCO)	
14–16 March	MTB French Cup - XCO - XCC - XCE	(France) Marseille	HC	Mathis Azzaro (FRA) (XCC); Jenny Rissveds (SWE) (XCC); Jeroen van Eck (NED) (XCE); Margaux Borrelly (FRA) (XCE); Simon Andreassen (DEN) (XCO); Jenny Rissveds (SWE) (XCO)	Jordan Sarrou (FRA) (XCC); Martina Berta (ITA) (XCC); Titouan Perrin-Ganier (FRA) (XCE); Coline Clauzure (FRA) (XCE); Mathis Azzaro (FRA) (XCO); Martina Berta (ITA) (XCO)	Joshua Dubau (FRA) (XCC); Loana Lecomte (FRA) (XCC); Theo Hauser (AUT) (XCE); Madison Boissiere (FRA) (XCE); Maximilian Brandl (GER) (XCO); Ronja Eibl (GER) (XCO)	
15 March	Internazionali d'Italia Series 1# - Pineta Sperane XCO	(Italy) San Zeno di Montagna	1	Filippo Fontana (ITA); Jolanda Neff (SUI)	Luca Martin (FRA); Ginia Caluori (SUI)	Juri Zanotti (ITA); Sofie Heby Pedersen (DEN)	
15 March	Scott Marathon	(Uruguay) Lavalleja Department	2	Álvaro Nicolás Davyt (URU); Ana Laura Fontes (URU)	Tomás Moyano (ARG); Elodie Kuijper (NED)	Maximiliano Generali (URU)	
15–16 March	Gran Premio Internacional Candeleda-Gredos	(Spain) Candeleda	1	David Campos (ESP); Estíbaliz Sagardoy (ESP)	Alberto Barroso (ESP); Núria Bosch Picó (ESP)	Francesc Barber (ESP); Merili Sirvel (EST)	
15–16 March	Portugal Cup DHI	(Portugal) Seia	1	Oisín O'Callaghan (IRL); Mikayla Parton (GBR)	Ethan Craik (GBR); Rosa Zierl (AUT)	Benoît Coulanges (FRA); Maria Pomés (ESP)	
16 March	Copa Catalana Internacional BTT Biking Point Corró D'Amunt	(Spain) Les Franqueses del Vallès	2	Jofre Cullell (ESP); Marta Cano Espinosa (ESP)	Thibaut Francois Baudry (ESP); Neus Parcerisas (ESP)	Jan Rajchart (CZE); Adaya Fernández (ESP)	
16–23 March	Absa Cape Epic - XCMS	(South Africa) Cape Town	SHC	Nino Schurter (SUI); Filippo Colombo (SUI); Annika Langvad (DEN); Sofía Gómez Villafañe (ARG)	Luca Braidot (ITA); Simone Avondetto (ITA); Vera Looser (NAM); Alexis Skarda (USA)	Marco Joubert (RSA); Tristan Nortje (RSA); Bianca Haw (RSA); Hayley Preen (RSA)	
20 March	Serbia EPIC Andrevlje XCO #1	(Serbia) Novi Sad	1	Jens Schuermans (BEL); Isla Short (GBR)	Alexandre Martins (FRA); Katharina Sadnik (AUT)	Benjamin Krüger (GER); Vita Movrin (SVN)	
20 March	US Pro Cup	(United States) Fayetteville	1	Christopher Blevins (USA); Kate Courtney (USA)	Brayden Johnson (USA); Jennifer Jackson (CAN)	Owen Clark (CAN); Gwendalyn Gibson (USA)	
21 March	Serbia EPIC Andrevlje XCO #2	(Serbia) Novi Sad	2	Jens Schuermans (BEL); Isla Short (GBR)	Benjamin Krüger (GER); Katharina Sadnik (AUT)	Christopher Dawson (IRL); Vita Movrin (SVN)	
21–22 March	US Pro Cup	(United States) Fayetteville	HC	Christopher Blevins (USA) (XCC); Kate Courtney (USA) (XCC); Christopher Blevins (USA) (XCO); Jennifer Jackson (CAN) (XCO)	Carter Woods (CAN) (XCC); Jennifer Jackson (CAN) (XCC); Riley Amos (USA) (XCO); Kate Courtney (USA) (XCO)	Riley Amos (USA) (XCC); Gwendalyn Gibson (USA) (XCC); Brayden Johnson (USA) (XCO); Gwendalyn Gibson (USA) (XCO)	
21–23 March	Japan Mountain Bike Cup	(Japan) Izu	1	Riki Kitabayashi (JPN) (XCC); Urara Kawaguchi (JPN) (XCC); Miguel Ramírez de Arellano Pascual (ESP) (XCO); Urara Kawaguchi (JPN) (XCO)	Miguel Ramírez de Arellano Pascual (ESP) (XCC); Tsai Ya-yu (TPE) (XCC); Riki Kitabayashi (JPN) (XCO); Sayu Bella Sukma Dewi (INA) (XCO)	Sho Takahashi (JPN) (XCC); Sayu Bella Sukma Dewi (INA) (XCC); Ryo Takeuchi (JPN) (XCO); Tsai Ya-yu (TPE) (XCO)	
21–23 March	Copa Colombia I	(Colombia) Popayán	2	Juan Fernando Monroy (COL) (XCC); Ana María Roa (COL) (XCC); Jhonnatan Botero Villegas (COL) (XCO); Ana María Roa (COL) (XCO)	Jerónimo Bedoya Botero (COL) (XCC); Paula Ladino (COL) (XCC); Juan Fernando Monroy (COL) (XCO); Paula Ladino (COL) (XCO)	Jonathan David Cantor (COL) (XCC); Angie Milena Lara (COL) (XCC); Juan Fernando Monroy (COL) (XCO); Camila Cagua (COL) (XCO)	
22 March	Serbia EPIC Andrevlje XCO #3	(Serbia) Novi Sad	2	Benjamin Krüger (GER); Isla Short (GBR)	Mathis Guay (FRA); Vita Movrin (SVN)	Alexandre Martins (FRA); Grace Inglis (GBR)	
22–23 March	Internazionali d'Italia Series #2 -Internazionale Argentario	(Italy) Monte Argentario	1	Andri Frischknecht (SUI); Emilly Johnston (CAN)	Filippo Fontana (ITA); Adéla Holubová (CZE)	Tobias Steinhart (GER); Lucia Bramati (ITA)	
22–23 March	Copa Internacional Metan	(Argentina) San José de Metán	2	Catriel Soto (ARG); Agustina Apaza (ARG)	Facundo Cayata (ARG); Agustina Antonella Quirós (ARG)	Nicolás Reynoso (ARG); Florencia Anabel Ávila (ARG)	
22–23 March	Super Cup Rimm Challenge	(Peru) Lima	2	Frank Kelvin Farfán (PER); Smith Guerrero Olivera (PER)	Frank Jampier Balcón Jeri (PER); Fabiana Vélez Hanke (PER)	Max Loa Alcarraz (PER)	
22–23 March	Portugal Cup DHI	(Portugal) Carvoeiro	2	Oisin O'Callaghan (IRL); Mikayla Parton (GBR)	Loris Revelli (ITA); Rosa Zierl (AUT)	Kasper Hickman (FIN); Zoe Zamora (ESP)	
23 March	Swiss Bike Cup	(Switzerland) Rivera	CS	Timon Rüegg (SUI); Jolanda Neff (SUI)	Luca Martin (FRA); Nicole Koller (SUI)	Charlie Aldridge (GBR); Loana Lecomte (FRA)	
23 March	XCO Losinj	(Croatia) Mali Lošinj	1	Daniele Braidot (ITA); Gabriela Wojtyła (POL)	Louis Beltritti (FRA); Regina Bruchner (HUN)	Rok Naglič (SVN); Jana Czeczinkarová (CZE)	
23 March	Serbia EPIC Andrevlje XCO #4	(Serbia) Novi Sad	1	Jens Schuermans (BEL); Isla Short (GBR)	Max Foidl (AUT); Katharina Sadnik (AUT)	Erik Hægstad (NOR); Grace Inglis (GBR)	
23 March	Shimano Supercup Massi Sabiñánigo	(Spain) Sabiñánigo	1	Jofre Cullell (ESP); Olivia Onesti (FRA)	David Campos (ESP); Janika Lõiv (EST)	Antoine Philipp (FRA); Yana Belomoyna (UKR)	
23 March	Taça Brasil de XCO-RJ	(Brazil) Rio Bonito	2	Ulan Bastos Galinski (BRA); Karen Olímpio (BRA)	Adair Prieto (MEX); Sabrina Oliveira (BRA)	Eiki Leoncio (BRA); Maria Eduarda Andrade (BRA)	
28 March	CIMTB #1 - Araxá - XCO U23 - XCC Elite Class 3	(Brazil) Araxá	HC	Luiz Cocuzzi (BRA); Karen Olímpio (BRA)	Adair Prieto (MEX); Lia Schrievers (GER)	Mārtiņš Blūms (LVA); Isabella Lacerda (BRA)	
28–30 March	Red Bull Tennessee National	(United States) Oliver Springs	1	Amaury Pierron (FRA); Aletha Ostgaard (USA)	Till Alran (FRA); Marine Cabirou (FRA)	Troy Brosnan (AUS); Lisa Baumann (SUI)	
29–30 March	Fullgaz Race powered by GHOST (Internationale MTB Bundesliga)	(Germany) Obergessertshausen	1	Thomas Litscher (SUI); Caroline Bohé (DEN)	Luca Schätti (SUI); Ginia Caluori (SUI)	Timon Rüegg (SUI); Steffi Häberlin (SUI)	
30 March	CIMTB #1 - Araxá - XCO ELITE	(Brazil) Araxá	HC	Ulan Bastos Galinski (BRA); Kira Böhm (GER)	Gustavo Xavier de Oliveira Pereira (BRA); Catalina Vidaurre (CHI)	Mathias Flückiger (SUI); Raiza Goulão (BRA)	
30 March	33. KTM Kamptal Trophy	(Austria) Langenlois	1	Mario Bair (AUT); Jitka Čábelická (CZE)	Petter Fagerhaug (NOR); Aleksandra Podgórska (POL)	Krzysztof Łukasik (POL); Matylda Szczecińska (POL)	
30 March	Marathon Cup Cambrils	(Spain) Cambrils	1	Eskil Evensen-Lie (NOR); Pilar Fernández (ESP)	Emil Hasund Eid (NOR); Paula Martín Varo (ESP)	Roberto Bou Martín (ESP); Nidia Aymara Danieluk Borget (ESP)	
30 March	3 Nations Cup: Zwiep Scott Cup - XCO	(Netherlands) Oldenzaal	2	Rens Teunissen van Manen (NED); Julia van der Meulen (NED)	Jarne Vandersteen (BEL); Elena Poppelaars (NED)	Nick Klijn (NED); Bloeme Kalis (NED)	
30 March	Asia Mountain Bike Series - Passi City	(Philippines) Passi	2	John Andre Aguja (PHI); Shagne Paula Yaoyao (PHI)	Adrian Nacario (PHI); Yui Ishida (JPN)	Jerico Rivera (PHI); Adel Pia Sendrijas (PHI)	
30 March	XCO Super Cup	(Portugal) Monsanto Forest Park	2	João Cruz (POR); Beatriz Guerra (POR)	João Fonseca (POR); Maaris Meier (EST)	Maxence Lemardele (FRA); Beatriz Sousa (POR)	
30 March	Ipaster Green Series XCO	(Spain) Ispaster	2	Miguel Ramírez de Arellano Pascual (ESP); Estíbaliz Sagardoy (ESP)	Nathan Celie (FRA); Tatiana Saitarova	Eneko Olveira Rodrigo (ESP); Amelie Laquebe (FRA)	
30 March	Vittoria-Fischer MTB Cup	(Switzerland) Langendorf	2	Luke Wiedmann (SUI); Tina Züger (SUI)	Fabio Püntener (SUI); Chrystelle Baumann (SUI)	Joel Roth (SUI); Paula Gorycka (POL)	

=== April ===
Date	Race Name	Location	Class	Winner	Second	Third	Ref
4 April	National Cup Race 4	(Israel) Kula Forest	1	Yoav Lifshitz (ISR); Na'ama Noyman (ISR)	Tomer Caspi (ISR); Avigaelle Lowy Yabets (ISR)	Nir Tchwella (ISR); Zohar Bar Joseph (ISR)	
5 April	XCO Premantura Rocky Trails	(Croatia) Premantura	1	Christoph Holzer (AUT); Isla Short (GBR)	Marek Rauchfuss (CZE); Vita Movrin (SVN)	Lukas Hatz (AUT); Lejla Njemčević (BIH)	
5 April	AC Heating Cup Ústí Nad Labem	(Czech Republic) Ústí nad Labem	2	Petter Fagerhaug (NOR); Jitka Čábelická (CZE)	Matej Ulík (SVK); Natalie Kaufmann (GER)	Patrik Černý (CZE); Kateřina Beyerová (CZE)	
5 April	Gaerne MTB Trophy	(Italy) Maser	2	Filippo Fontana (ITA); Nicole Pesse (ITA)	Daniele Braidot (ITA); Lucrezia Braida (ITA)	Gioele Bertolini (ITA); Giada Martinoli (ITA)	
5 April	12ª Jamón Bike - XCM	(Spain) Calamocha	2	Francisco Herrero Casas (ESP); Natalia Fischer (ESP)	Roberto Bou Martín (ESP); Pilar Fernández (ESP)	Raúl Rodríguez Jiménez (ESP); Tamara Seijas (ESP)	
5–6 April	iXS European Downhill Cup - Serra do Caramulo	(Portugal) Tondela	CS	Nathan Pontvianne (FRA); Valentina Höll (AUT)	Thomas Estaque (FRA); Veronika Widmann (ITA)	Ethan Craik (GBR); Mathilde Bernard (FRA)	
5–6 April	Monster Energy Pro Downhill Series - Rock Creek	(United States) Zirconia	CS	Luca Shaw (USA); Anna Newkirk (USA)	Kenneth Pinkerton (USA); Lisa Baumann (SUI)	Aaron Gwin (USA); Maylei Leaneagh (USA)	
5–6 April	Abrantes XCO	(Portugal) Abrantes	2	Rafael Sousa (POR); Beatriz Guerra (POR)	Ricardo Marinheiro (POR); Leandra Gomes (POR)	Filipe Francisco (POR); Maaris Meier (EST)	
6 April	Lloyds National Cross Country MTB Series Round 1	(United Kingdom) Cannock Chase	2	Cameron Orr (GBR); Grace Inglis (GBR)	Max Greensill (GBR); Bethany-Ann Jackson (GBR)	Christopher Dawson (IRL); Eilish Gilbert (GBR)	
6 April	Garda MTB Marathon International	(Italy) Garda	2	Andrea Siffredi (ITA); Sandra Mairhofer (ITA)	Stefano Goria (ITA); Claudia Peretti (ITA)	Gianantonio Mazzola (ITA); Mara Fumagalli (ITA)	
6 April	XXII MTB "Rusza Peleton" Puchar Polski IV Memoriał im. Wiesława Grabka	(Poland) Ogrodniczki	2	Krzysztof Łukasik (POL); Gabriela Wojtyła (POL)	Karol Ostaszewski (POL); Klaudia Czabok (POL)	Paweł Bernas (POL); Aleksandra Podgórska (POL)	
6 April	G.P. Internacional X-SAUCE	(Spain) Alpedrete	2	Hugo Franco Gallego (ESP); Tatiana Saitarova	Alberto Mingorance (ESP); Núria Bosch Picó (ESP)	Francesc Barber (ESP); Estíbaliz Sagardoy (ESP)	
6 April	Miskolc XCO	(Hungary) Miskolc	3	Jakub Jenčuš (SVK)	Vince Dániel Kiss (HUN)	Florián Papcun (SVK)	
11–12 April	Namibia XC 1	(Namibia) Windhoek	1	Michael Foster (RSA); Lilian Baber (RSA)	Ignatius du Preez (RSA); Anri Greeff (NAM)	Daniel van der Watt (RSA); Monique du Plessis (NAM)	
11–12 April	The Showdown @Angler's Ridge	(United States) Danville	2	Tyler Orschel (CAN) (XCC); Alice Hoskins (USA) (XCC); Tyler Orschel (CAN) (XCO); Alice Hoskins (USA) (XCO)	Devon Feehan (USA) (XCC); Ada Watson (USA) (XCC); Devon Feehan (USA) (XCO); Nicole Bradbury (CAN) (XCO)	Robbie Day (USA) (XCC); Nicole Bradbury (CAN) (XCC); Toby Hassett (USA) (XCO); Ayana Gagné (CAN) (XCO)	
12 April	Primavera	(Belgium) Andenne	2	Frans Claes (BEL); Rosa van Doorn (NED)	Simon Grégoire (BEL); Julia Grégoire (BEL)	Jason Bouttell (BEL); Puck Pinxt (NED)	
12 April	AC Heating Cup Stříbro - Velká cena KION Group	(Czech Republic) Stříbro	2	Jan Rajchart (CZE); Aleksandra Podgórska (POL)	Leszek Jaśkiewicz (POL); Laura Choma (POL)	Patrik Černý (CZE); Kateřina Beyerová (CZE)	
12 April	Triada MTB Avrig	(Romania) Avrig	2	József Málnási (ROU); Barbara Benkó (HUN)	George-Bogdan Duca (ROU); Suzanne Hilbert (ROU)	Patrick Pescaru (ROU); Miruna Mada (ROU)	
12 April	SP XCO Porostav Turieckap	(Slovakia) Turčianske Teplice	3	Matej Ulík (SVK); Gabriela Wojtyła (POL)	Jakub Jenčuš (SVK); Regina Bruchner (HUN)	Mateusz Nieboras (POL); Jana Czeczinkarová (CZE)	
12–13 April	Marlene Südtirol Sunshine Race	(Italy) Nals	HC	Luca Schätti (SUI); Ramona Forchini (SUI)	Luke Wiedmann (SUI); Steffi Häberlin (SUI)	Filippo Fontana (ITA); Isla Short (GBR)	
12–13 April	Asia Mountain Bike Series - Dirt Heroes International by Planout.io	(Philippines) Sibulan	2	Niño Martin Eday (PHI) (DHI); Naomi Gardoce (PHI) (DHI); Tatsuumi Soejima (JPN) (XCO); Shagne Paula Yaoyao (PHI) (XCO)	John Derick Farr (PHI) (DHI); Lea Denise Belgira (PHI) (DHI); James Carl Dela Cruz (PHI) (XCO); Nicole Quiñones (PHI) (XCO)	Eleazar Barba Jr. (PHI) (DHI); Danielle Erin Rodriguez (PHI) (DHI); Adrian Nacario (PHI) (XCO); Adel Pia Sendrijas (PHI) (XCO)	
12–13 April	Portugal Cup DHI	(Portugal) Arcos de Valdevez	2	Jack Reading (GBR); Maria Pomés Garcia (ESP)	Neo Tielens (BEL); Kira Zamora (ESP)	Tomás Barreiros (POR); Mireia Pi Madrenas (ESP)	
13 April	3 Nations Cup - Watersley XCO Challenge	(Denmark) Sittard	1	Antoine Jamin (BEL); Femke Mossinkoff (NED)	Freek Bouten (NED); Julia van der Meulen (NED)	Kas van Geest (NED); Bloeme Kalis (NED)	
13 April	Serbia EPIC 4 Kilometar Pirot	(Serbia) Pirot	2	Roberto Burța (ROU); Bojana Jovanović (SRB)	Victor Enev (BUL); Iva Škrbić (SRB)	Damjan Stanišić (SRB)	
13 April	Ortuella Green Series XCO - Las Balsas XC	(Spain) Ortuella	2	Hugo Franco Gallego (ESP); Tatiana Saitarova	Eneit Vertiz (ESP); Estíbaliz Sagardoy (ESP)	Nathan Célié (FRA); Emma Terrigeol (FRA)	
13 April	Yunus Emre MTB Cup	(Turkey) Manisa	2	Emre Yavuz (TUR); Azize Bekar (TUR)	Zeki Kaygısız (TUR); Eki̇n Ereke (TUR)	Süleyman Temel (TUR); Tuğçe Bitirim (TUR)	
13 April	Sæsonåbner MTB Race	(Denmark) Aabenraa	3	Nils Johansson (SWE); Emma Lyngholm (DEN)	Jonas Posselt Gamborg (DEN); Janni Spangsberg (DEN)	Frederik Hviid Borning (DEN); Mia Westergaard (DEN)	
14–19 April	4 Islands Epic	(Croatia) Unije, Mali Lošinj, Cres, Baška	S1	Hans Becking (NED); Wout Alleman (BEL); Mónica Calderon (COL); Tessa Kortekaas (NED)	Nicholas Pettinà (ITA); Ramon Vantaggiato (ITA); Bianca Haw (RSA); Vera Looser (NAM)	Pierre Billaud (FRA); Théo Dupras (FRA); Costanza Fasolis (ITA); Pilar Fernández (ESP)	
18 April	Campeonato Sudamericano de Enduro	(Argentina) Villa La Angostura	3	Martin Bonanno (ARG) (E-MTB END); Jeremías Maio (ARG); María José Muñoz (ARG)	Valentino Cuoghi (ARG) (E-MTB END); Jerónimo Paez (ARG); Florencia Pintos (ARG)	José Ignacio Fabian (ARG) (E-MTB END); Facundo Descalzo (ARG); Belén Petcoff (ARG)	
18 April	Volcat BTT Igualada - XCO E1	(Spain) Igualada	3	Raul Villar (ESP); Janika Lõiv (EST)	Xavier Pijuan Porcel (ESP); Estíbaliz Sagardoy (ESP)	Xavier Ariza (ESP); Meritxell Figueras (ESP)	
19 April	Bikerennen Arbon	(Switzerland) Arbon	3	Romain Debord (FRA); Sirin Städler (SUI)	Micha Alder (SUI); Eliane Müggler (SUI)	Livio Stefani (SUI); Sabrina Bärtschi (SUI)	
19 April	Velosolutions UCI Pump Track World Championship Qualifier	(United Arab Emirates) Abu Dhabi	3	Thibault Dupont (FRA); Kristína Madarásová (SVK)	Sirio Grünig (SUI); Kristína Nováková (SVK)	Ilia Beskrovnyi; Lena Szerling (POL)	
19–20 April	Copa Aguavista XCO	(Paraguay) San Juan del Paraná	1	David Campos (ESP); Agustina María Apaza (ARG)	Jofre Cullell (ESP); Agustina Antonella Quirós (ARG)	Catriel Soto (ARG); Luiza Eusébio de Souza (BRA)	
20 April	Campeonato Sudamericao de DHI	(Argentina) Villa La Angostura	2	Gonzalo Gajdosech (ARG); Camila Nogueira (ARG)	Pablo Seewald (ARG); Fernanda Gildemeister Menzel (CHI)	Álvaro Martínez Yañez (CHI); Ivonne Risco Narváez (CHI)	
20 April	Volcat BTT Igualada - XCO E2	(Spain) Igualada	3	Raul Villar (ESP); Janika Lõiv (EST)	Maxime Croket (BEL); Estíbaliz Sagardoy (ESP)	Xavier Ariza (ESP); Kim Ames (GER)	
25–27 April	iXS European Downhill Cup - Nevis Range	(United Kingdom) Fort William	CS	Charlie Hatton (GBR); Harriet Harnden (GBR)	Matt Walker (GBR); Nina Hoffmann (GER)	Danny Hart (GBR); Jess Blewitt (NZL)	
25–27 April	MTB French Cup - XCO/XCC	(France) Guéret	HC	Jordan Sarrou (FRA) (XCC); Loana Lecomte (FRA) (XCC); Jordan Sarrou (FRA) (XCO); Loana Lecomte (FRA) (XCO)	Mathis Guay (FRA) (XCC); Chiara Teocchi (ITA) (XCC); Mathis Guay (FRA) (XCO); Nina Graf (GER) (XCO)	Niklas Schehl (GER) (XCC); Noëlle Buri (SUI) (XCC); Joshua Dubau (FRA) (XCO); Chiara Teocchi (ITA) (XCO)	
26 April	MTB Caneva Trophy	(Italy) Caneva	1	Filippo Fontana (ITA); Sara Cortinovis (ITA)	Gioele Bertolini (ITA); Vita Movrin (SVN)	Pierre de Froidmont (BEL); Nicole Pesse (ITA)	
26 April	Huskvarna MTB-Tour	(Sweden) Huskvarna	1	Leo Lounela (SWE); Mari-Liis Mõttus (EST)	André Eriksson (SWE); Elin Karlsson (SWE)	Markus Karlsson (SWE); Tilda Hylén (SWE)	
26 April	XCO Gradina	(Bosnia and Herzegovina) Čapljina	3	Marco Bidoggia (ITA); Karla Kustura (BIH)	Ivan Soldo (BIH); Nina Vidović (BIH)	Nikola Spaić (BIH)	
26–27 April	Portugal Cup XCO – Lousada International XCO	(Portugal) Lousada	2				
26–27 April	Portugal Cup DHI	(Portugal) Castro Daire	2				

== National championships ==
=== Argentina ===
Date	Venue	Podium (Men)		Podium (Women)	
XCM; 9 March 2025	Argentina; Chilecito	1	Catriel Soto	1	Inés Gutiérrez
XCM; 9 March 2025	Argentina; Chilecito	2	Agustín Durán	2	Maria Laura Bugarin
XCM; 9 March 2025	Argentina; Chilecito	3	Fernando Contreras	3	Aldana Silman

=== Australia ===
Date	Venue	Podium (Men)		Podium (Women)	
XCO; 13–16 March 2025	Australia; Mount Buller	1	Sam Fox	1	Rebecca Henderson
XCO; 13–16 March 2025	Australia; Mount Buller	2	Jack Ward	2	Isabella Flint
XCO; 13–16 March 2025	Australia; Mount Buller	3	Reece Tucknott	3	Zoe Cuthbert

Date	Venue	Podium (Men)		Podium (Women)	
XCC; 14 March 2025	Australia; Mount Buller	1	Jack Ward	1	Rebecca Henderson
XCC; 14 March 2025	Australia; Mount Buller	2	Scott Bowden	2	Isabella Flint
XCC; 14 March 2025	Australia; Mount Buller	3	Tasman Nankervis	3	Zoe Cuthbert

Date	Venue	Podium (Men)		Podium (Women)	
E–XC; 13–16 March 2025	Australia; Mount Buller	1	Shannon Johnson	1	Jessica Hoskin
E–XC; 13–16 March 2025	Australia; Mount Buller	2	Martin Broman	2	Connor Mielke
E–XC; 13–16 March 2025	Australia; Mount Buller	3	Scott Farrar	3	

Date	Venue	Podium (Men)		Podium (Women)	
DHI; 14–15 March 2025	Australia; Mount Buller	1	Luke Meier-Smith	1	Sian A'Hern
DHI; 14–15 March 2025	Australia; Mount Buller	2	Troy Brosnan	2	Elleni Turkovic
DHI; 14–15 March 2025	Australia; Mount Buller	3	Kye A'Hern	3	Sacha Mills

Date	Venue	Podium	
XCR; 13 March 2025	Australia; Mount Buller	1	Connor Wright; Zoe Cuthbert; Rohin Adams; Harry Doye
XCR; 13 March 2025	Australia; Mount Buller	2	Brent Rees; Finn Slide; Charli Edwick; Andrew Low
XCR; 13 March 2025	Australia; Mount Buller	3	Harry Greenfield; Adam Cooper; April Foster; Scott Wines

=== Bermuda ===
Date	Venue	Podium (Men)		Podium (Women)	
XCO; 30 March 2025	Bermuda; Ferry Reach	1	Robin Horsfield	1	Gabriella Arnold
XCO; 30 March 2025	Bermuda; Ferry Reach	2	Conor White	2	Florence Pedro
XCO; 30 March 2025	Bermuda; Ferry Reach	3	Che'Quan Richardson	3	

=== Chile ===
Date	Venue	Podium (Men)		Podium (Women)	
XCO; 14–16 March 2025	Chile; Angol	1	Martín Vidaurre	1	Catalina Vidaurre
XCO; 14–16 March 2025	Chile; Angol	2	Ignacio Gallo Florido	2	Yarela González
XCO; 14–16 March 2025	Chile; Angol	3	Patricio Farías Díaz	3	María Castro Gonzalez

Date	Venue	Podium (Men)		Podium (Women)	
XCC; 14–16 March 2025	Chile; Angol	1	Nicolás Delich Pardo	1	Catalina Vidaurre
XCC; 14–16 March 2025	Chile; Angol	2	Patricio Farías Díaz	2	Yarela González
XCC; 14–16 March 2025	Chile; Angol	3	Maximiliano San Martín Cartes	3	María Castro Gonzalez

=== Costa Rica ===
Date	Venue	Podium (Men)		Podium (Women)
END; 16 March 2025	Costa Rica; Heredia	1	Álvaro Hidalgo Vásquez	1
END; 16 March 2025	Costa Rica; Heredia	2	Bayron González	2
END; 16 March 2025	Costa Rica; Heredia	3	José Vásquez Herrera	3

Date	Venue	Podium (Men)		Podium (Women)
END electric 16 March 2025	Costa Rica; Heredia	1	Enrique Ramírez Martínez	1
END electric 16 March 2025	Costa Rica; Heredia	2	Jan Xirinachs Robert	2
END electric 16 March 2025	Costa Rica; Heredia	3	Jhonny Flores Mora	3

=== France ===
Date	Venue	Podium (Men)		Podium (Women)	
SNO; 8–9 March 2025	France; Puy-Saint-Vincent	1	Thomas Di Litta	1	Morgane Such
SNO; 8–9 March 2025	France; Puy-Saint-Vincent	2	Theo Mathieu	2	
SNO; 8–9 March 2025	France; Puy-Saint-Vincent	3	Tristan Courmes	3	

=== Guam ===
Date	Venue	Podium (Men)		Podium (Women)	
XCE; 5 April 2025	Greece; Acharnes	1	Alexandros Karousos	1	Maria Aikaterini Aza
XCE; 5 April 2025	Greece; Acharnes	2	Georgios Grigoriadis	2	Eleftheria Giachou
XCE; 5 April 2025	Greece; Acharnes	3	Nikolaos Georgiadis	3	Varvara Fasoi

=== Guam ===
Date	Venue	Podium (Men)		Podium (Women)	
XCO; 23 March 2025	Guam; Piti	1	Blayde Blas	1	Jennifer Camacho
XCO; 23 March 2025	Guam; Piti	2	Derek Horton	2	Blanda Camacho
XCO; 23 March 2025	Guam; Piti	3	Sage Gerber	3	

=== Guatemala ===
Date	Venue	Podium (Men)		Podium (Women)	
XCO; 23 March 2025	Guatemala; Antigua Guatemala	1	Julio Ispaché	1	Olga Mariela Rodas
XCO; 23 March 2025	Guatemala; Antigua Guatemala	2	Esdras Morales	2	Ximena González
XCO; 23 March 2025	Guatemala; Antigua Guatemala	3	Oscar Emilio Serech Chan	3	Graciela Queché

=== India ===
Date	Venue	Podium (Men)		Podium (Women)	
XCO; 28–31 March 2025	India; Morni	1	Adonis Tangpu	1	Star Narzary
XCO; 28–31 March 2025	India; Morni	2	Shiven Shiven	2	Pranita Soman
XCO; 28–31 March 2025	India; Morni	3	Ronel Khundrakpam Singh	3	Sandhya Mourya

Date	Venue	Podium (Men)		Podium (Women)	
DHI; 28–31 March 2025	India; Morni	1	Yawar Khan	1	Thilothamma S
DHI; 28–31 March 2025	India; Morni	2	Meban Suiam	2	Sandhya Mourya
DHI; 28–31 March 2025	India; Morni	3	Virendra Mali	3	Asawari Kale

=== Israel ===
Date	Venue	Podium (Men)		Podium (Women)	
XCC; 25 April 2025	Israel; Kula Forest	1	Tomer Zaltsman	1	Na'ama Noyman
XCC; 25 April 2025	Israel; Kula Forest	2	Yoav Lifshitz	2	Munira Yasin
XCC; 25 April 2025	Israel; Kula Forest	3	Nir Tchwella	3	Romi Veldnizki

=== Lesotho ===
Date	Venue	Podium (Men)		Podium (Women)	
XCO; 11 January 2025	Lesotho; Mazenod	1	Phetetso Monese	1	Tsepiso Lerata
XCO; 11 January 2025	Lesotho; Mazenod	2	Tumelo Makae	2	
XCO; 11 January 2025	Lesotho; Mazenod	3	Thato Tlouoe	3	

=== New Zealand ===
Date	Venue	Podium (Men)		Podium (Women)	
XCO; 22–23 February 2025	New Zealand; Rotorua	1	Anton Cooper	1	Sammie Maxwell
XCO; 22–23 February 2025	New Zealand; Rotorua	2	Matthew Wilson	2	Josie Wilcox
XCO; 22–23 February 2025	New Zealand; Rotorua	3	Coen Nicol	3	Maria Laurie

Date	Venue	Podium (Men)		Podium (Women)	
XCC; 22–23 February 2025	New Zealand; Rotorua	1	Anton Cooper	1	Sammie Maxwell
XCC; 22–23 February 2025	New Zealand; Rotorua	2	Matthew Wilson	2	Maria Laurie
XCC; 22–23 February 2025	New Zealand; Rotorua	3	Ethan Rose	3	Annabel Bligh

Date	Venue	Podium (Men)		Podium (Women)	
DHI; 22–23 February 2025	New Zealand; Rotorua	1	Tuhoto-Ariki Pene	1	Jenna Hastings
DHI; 22–23 February 2025	New Zealand; Rotorua	2	Lachlan Stevens-McNab	2	Sacha Earnest
DHI; 22–23 February 2025	New Zealand; Rotorua	3	Tyler Waite	3	Kate Hastings

Date	Venue	Podium (Men)		Podium (Women)	
END; 28 February – 2 March 2025	New Zealand; Nelson	1	Brady Stone	1	Xanthe Robb
END; 28 February – 2 March 2025	New Zealand; Nelson	2	Joe Millington	2	Winnifred Goldsbury
END; 28 February – 2 March 2025	New Zealand; Nelson	3	Lachie Ross	3	Lucy Kemp

=== Peru ===
Date	Venue	Podium (Men)		Podium (Women)	
DHI; 12–13 April 2025	Peru; Cusco	1	Mateo Negri	1	Sofía Arrue
DHI; 12–13 April 2025	Peru; Cusco	2		2	
DHI; 12–13 April 2025	Peru; Cusco	3		3	

=== South Africa ===
Date	Venue	Podium (Men)		Podium (Women)	
DHI; 20 April 2025	South Africa; Pietermaritzburg	1	Rory Kirk	1	Frances Du Toit
DHI; 20 April 2025	South Africa; Pietermaritzburg	2	Keagan Brand	2	Arielle Behr
DHI; 20 April 2025	South Africa; Pietermaritzburg	3	Théo Erlangsen	3	Jenna Byrnes

== UCI MTB World Series ==
=== 2025 UCI Mountain Bike World Cup ===
==== XCO ====
Date	Venue	Podium (Men)		Podium (Women)	
XCO; 6 April 2025	Brazil; Araxá	1	(France) Victor Koretzky	1	(New Zealand) Sammie Maxwell
XCO; 6 April 2025	Brazil; Araxá	2	(United States) Christopher Blevins	2	(Switzerland) Nicole Koller
XCO; 6 April 2025	Brazil; Araxá	3	(Chile) Martín Vidaurre	3	(United States) Savilia Blunk
XCO; 12 April 2025	Brazil; Araxá	1	(United States) Christopher Blevins	1	(Sweden) Jenny Rissveds
XCO; 12 April 2025	Brazil; Araxá	2	(Chile) Martín Vidaurre	2	(New Zealand) Sammie Maxwell
XCO; 12 April 2025	Brazil; Araxá	3	(France) Adrien Boichis	3	(United Kingdom) Evie Richards

==== XCC ====
Date	Venue	Podium (Men)		Podium (Women)	
XCC; 5 April 2025	Brazil; Araxá	1	(United States) Christopher Blevins	1	(United Kingdom) Evie Richards
XCC; 5 April 2025	Brazil; Araxá	2	(France) Victor Koretzky	2	(New Zealand) Sammie Maxwell
XCC; 5 April 2025	Brazil; Araxá	3	(France) Mathis Azzaro	3	(Switzerland) Alessandra Keller
XCC; 11 April 2025	Brazil; Araxá	1	(United States) Christopher Blevins	1	(United Kingdom) Evie Richards
XCC; 11 April 2025	Brazil; Araxá	2	(France) Victor Koretzky	2	(Switzerland) Nicole Koller
XCC; 11 April 2025	Brazil; Araxá	3	(Switzerland) Nino Schurter	3	(Sweden) Jenny Rissveds

==== XCE ====
Date	Venue	Podium (Men)		Podium (Women)	
XCE; 13 April 2025	Tajikistan; Dushanbe	1	(Slovenia) Jakob Klemenčič	1	(Ukraine) Mariia Sukhopalova
XCE; 13 April 2025	Tajikistan; Dushanbe	2	(Sweden) Edvin Lindh	2	(Germany) Marion Fromberger
XCE; 13 April 2025	Tajikistan; Dushanbe	3	(Germany) Simon Gegenheimer	3	(France) Madison Boissiere

== Continental Championships ==
=== Asian Continental Championships ===
==== XCO ====
Date	Venue	Podium (Men)		Podium (Women)	
XCO; 23–27 April 2025	China; Guizhou	1	(China) Mi Jiujiang	1	(China) Wu Zhifan
XCO; 23–27 April 2025	China; Guizhou	2	(Kazakhstan) Denis Sergiyenko	2	(China) Liang Zhenglan
XCO; 23–27 April 2025	China; Guizhou	3	(China) Yuan Jinwei	3	(China) Li Hongfeng

==== XCE ====
Date	Venue	Podium (Men)		Podium (Women)	
XCE; 23–27 April 2025	China; Guizhou	1	(China) Lü Xianjing	1	(China) Gao Yuanpan
XCE; 23–27 April 2025	China; Guizhou	2	(China) Yuan Jinwei	2	(China) Liang Zhenglan
XCE; 23–27 April 2025	China; Guizhou	3	(Singapore) Riyadh Hakim	3	(China) Ma Caixia

==== DHI ====
Date	Venue	Podium (Men)		Podium (Women)	
DHI; 23–27 April 2025	China; Guizhou	1	(Thailand) Methasit Boonsane	1	(Indonesia) Milatul Khaqimah
DHI; 23–27 April 2025	China; Guizhou	2	(Japan) Yuki Kushima	2	(Indonesia) Riska Amelia Agustina
DHI; 23–27 April 2025	China; Guizhou	3	(Chinese Taipei) Chiang Sheng-shan	3	(Thailand) Vipavee Deekaballes

==== XCR ====
Date	Venue	Podium	
XCR; 23–27 April 2025	China; Guizhou	1	China (CHN); Sheng Wang; Wang Ting; Wang Zhihao; Zhang Fenfen; Wu Zhifan; Mi Jiujiang
XCR; 23–27 April 2025	China; Guizhou	2	Kazakhstan (KAZ); Bogdan Lukhmanov; Violetta Kazakova; Alexey Fefelov; Alina Karassyova; Yuliya Li; Denis Sergiyenko
XCR; 23–27 April 2025	China; Guizhou	3	India (IND); Adonis Tangpu; Pranita Soman; Star Narzary; Tsewang Norboo; Avni Dariyal; Charith Gowda

=== American Continental Championships ===
==== DHI ====
Date	Venue	Podium (Men)		Podium (Women)	
DHI; 22–23 March 2025	Chile; Araucanía Region	1	(Chile) Álvaro Martínez Yañez	1	(Chile) Paz Gallo
DHI; 22–23 March 2025	Chile; Araucanía Region	2	(Colombia) Sebastian Holguin	2	(Colombia) Valentina Roa Sánchez
DHI; 22–23 March 2025	Chile; Araucanía Region	3	(Brazil) Roger Vieira	3	(Canada) Andréane Lanthier Nadeau

=== Oceanian Mountain Bike Championships ===
==== XCO ====
Date	Venue	Podium (Men)		Podium (Women)	
XCO; 21–23 March 2025	New Zealand; Queenstown	1	(Australia) Sam Fox	1	(New Zealand) Sammie Maxwell
XCO; 21–23 March 2025	New Zealand; Queenstown	2	(New Zealand) Anton Cooper	2	(Australia) Zoe Cuthbert
XCO; 21–23 March 2025	New Zealand; Queenstown	3	(New Zealand) Samuel Shaw	3	(New Zealand) Mary Gray

==== XCC ====
Date	Venue	Podium (Men)		Podium (Women)	
XCC; 21–23 March 2025	New Zealand; Queenstown	1	(New Zealand) Anton Cooper	1	(New Zealand) Sammie Maxwell
XCC; 21–23 March 2025	New Zealand; Queenstown	2	(Australia) Sam Fox	2	(New Zealand) Maria Laurie
XCC; 21–23 March 2025	New Zealand; Queenstown	3	(New Zealand) Samuel Shaw	3	(Australia) Zoe Cuthbert

==== DHI ====
Date	Venue	Podium (Men)		Podium (Women)	
DHI; 21–23 March 2025	New Zealand; Queenstown	1	(New Zealand) Tyler Waite	1	(New Zealand) Indy Deavoll
DHI; 21–23 March 2025	New Zealand; Queenstown	2	(New Zealand) Rory Meek	2	(New Zealand) Jess Blewitt
DHI; 21–23 March 2025	New Zealand; Queenstown	3	(New Zealand) Malik Boatwright	3	(New Zealand) Bellah Birchall

== World championships ==
=== Snow ===
Date	Venue	Podium (Men)		Podium (Women)	
Snow; 8 February 2025	France; Châtel	1	Léo Grisel (Dual Slalom); Vincent Tupin (Super G)	1	Lisa Baumann (Dual Slalom); Lisa Baumann (Super G)
Snow; 8 February 2025	France; Châtel	2	Pierre Thévenard (Dual Slalom); Pierre Thévenard (Super G)	2	Zoé Fayolle (Dual Slalom); Vicky Clavel (Super G)
Snow; 8 February 2025	France; Châtel	3	Vincent Tupin (Dual Slalom); Cédric Gracia (Super G)	3	Morgane Such (Dual Slalom); Zoé Fayolle (Super G)
