= Cycling at the 2023 European Games – Men's cross-country =

Men's cross-country at the 2023 European Games
- Venue: Krynica-Zdrój Hill Park
- Date: 25 June
- Competitors: 74 from 25 nations
- Winning time: 1:19:41

Medalists
| gold medal | Vlad Dascălu | Romania |
| silver medal | Lars Forster | Switzerland |
| bronze medal | Luca Braidot | Italy |

The men's cross-country mountain biking event at the 2023 European Games took place on 25 June 2023 at the Krynica-Zdrój Hill Park. The event will feature 76 cyclists representing 27 nations.

== Competition format ==
The competition is a mass-start, six-lap race. There is only one round of competition. The mountain bike course is 3.9 kilometres (2.4 mi) long, with sudden changes in elevation, narrow dirt trails, and rocky sections.

== Results ==
| Rank | # | Cyclist | Nation | Time | Diff. |
|---|---|---|---|---|---|
| 1st place, gold medalist(s) | 10 | Vlad Dascălu | Romania | 1:19:41 | |
| 2nd place, silver medalist(s) | 6 | Lars Forster | Switzerland | 1:19:55 | +0:14 |
| 3rd place, bronze medalist(s) | 2 | Luca Braidot | Italy | 1:20:00 | +0:19 |
| 4 | 4 | Luca Schwarzbauer | Germany | 1:20:08 | +0:27 |
| 5 | 1 | David Valero | Spain | 1:20:11 | +0:30 |
| 6 | 3 | Pierre de Froidmont | Belgium | 1:20:35 | +0:54 |
| 7 | 9 | Sebastian Fini Carstensen | Denmark | 1:20:44 | +1:03 |
| 8 | 18 | Thomas Litscher | Switzerland | 1:20:49 | +1:08 |
| 9 | 16 | Marcel Guerrini | Switzerland | 1:20:57 | +1:16 |
| 10 | 13 | Ondřej Cink | Czech Republic | 1:21:10 | +1:29 |
| 11 | 36 | Mats Tubaas Glende | Norway | 1:21:10 | +1:29 |
| 12 | 48 | Cameron Mason | Great Britain | 1:21:17 | +1:36 |
| 13 | 21 | Knut Røhme | Norway | 1:21:35 | +1:54 |
| 14 | 27 | Joel Roth | Switzerland | 1:21:38 | +1:57 |
| 15 | 31 | Emil Hasund Eid | Norway | 1:21:39 | +1:58 |
| 16 | 40 | Simon Walter | Switzerland | 1:21:46 | +2:05 |
| 17 | 35 | Krzysztof Łukasik | Poland | 1:21:50 | +2:09 |
| 18 | 30 | Cameron Orr | Great Britain | 1:21:51 | +2:10 |
| 19 | 8 | David Campos | Spain | 1:22:10 | +2:29 |
| 20 | 22 | Maximilian Foidl | Austria | 1:22:12 | +2:31 |
| 21 | 5 | Jens Schuermans | Belgium | 1:22:19 | +2:38 |
| 22 | 12 | Bartłomiej Wawak | Poland | 1:22:22 | +2:41 |
| 23 | 37 | Georg Egger | Germany | 1:22:26 | +2:45 |
| 24 | 7 | Mārtiņš Blūms | Latvia | 1:22:33 | +2:52 |
| 25 | 26 | Pablo Rodríguez | Spain | 1:22:38 | +2:57 |
| 26 | 11 | Daniele Braidot | Italy | 1:22:45 | +3:04 |
| 27 | 42 | Leon Kaiser | Germany | 1:22:46 | +3:05 |
| 28 | 73 | Petter Fagerhaug | Norway | 1:22:47 | +3:06 |
| 29 | 25 | Simon Andreassen | Denmark | 1:22:56 | +3:15 |
| 30 | 17 | Andri Frischknecht | Switzerland | 1:22:57 | +3:16 |
| 31 | 45 | Alexandre Balmer | Switzerland | 1:23:11 | +3:30 |
| 32 | 28 | David List | Germany | 1:23:20 | +3:39 |
| 33 | 44 | Clément Horny | Belgium | 1:23:43 | +4:02 |
| 34 | 29 | Mathis Azzaro | France | 1:23:58 | +4:17 |
| 35 | 20 | Maximilian Brandl | Germany | 1:24:00 | +4:19 |
| 36 | 23 | Jofre Cullell | Spain | 1:24:09 | +4:28 |
| 37 | 24 | Gregor Raggl | Austria | 1:24:11 | +4:30 |
| 38 | 15 | Nadir Colledani | Italy | 1:24:11 | +4:30 |
| 39 | 53 | Christopher Dawson | Ireland | 1:24:32 | +4:51 |
| 40 | 39 | Arne Janssens | Belgium | 1:25:14 | +5:33 |
| 41 | 19 | Gil Ly Gonen | Israel | 1:25:27 | +5:46 |
| 42 | 69 | Paweł Bernas | Poland | 1:25:52 | +6:11 |
| 43 | 56 | Jan Škarnitzl | Czech Republic | 1:26:03 | +6:22 |
| 44 | 61 | Jan Vastl | Czech Republic | 1:26:31 | +6:50 |
| 45 | 52 | Karl Markt | Austria | 1:27:20 | +7:39 |
| 46 | 74 | Milan Vader | Netherlands | 1:27:41 | +8:00 |
| 47 | 47 | Lukáš Kobes | Czech Republic | 1:27:43 | +8:02 |
| 48 | 60 | Karol Ostaszewski | Poland | 1:28:12 | +8:31 |
| 49 | 14 | Simone Avondetto | Italy | 1:28:16 | +8:35 |
| 50 | 57 | Michał Topór | Poland | 1:28:29 | +8:48 |
| 51 | 46 | Dmytro Titarenko | Ukraine | 1:28:44 | +9:03 |
| 52 | 54 | Rok Naglič | Slovenia | 1:29:17 | +9:36 |
| 53 | 33 | Zsombor Palumby | Hungary | 1:29:35 | +9:54 |
| 54 | 51 | Matej Ulík | Slovakia | 1:29:35 | +9:54 |
| 55 | 43 | Ricardo Marinheiro | Portugal | 1:30:52 | +11:11 |
| 56 | 62 | Ede Molnár | Romania | 1:32:05 | +12:24 |
| 57 | 75 | Karol Rożek | Poland | 1:32:57 | +13:16 |
| 58 | 50 | Tomer Zaltsman | Israel | 1:33:44 | +14:03 |
| 59 | 65 | Kirill Tarassov | Estonia | -1 LAP | |
| 60 | 68 | Ignas Ambrazas | Lithuania | -1 LAP | |
| 61 | 67 | Josten Vaidem | Estonia | -1 LAP | |
| 62 | 71 | Šarūnas Pacevičius | Lithuania | -1 LAP | |
| 63 | 49 | Eitan Levi | Israel | -1 LAP | |
| 64 | 66 | Jozsef Malnasi | Romania | -1 LAP | |
| 65 | 77 | Sergii Rysenko | Ukraine | -1 LAP | |
| 66 | 72 | Maciej Jeziorski | Poland | -1 LAP | |
| 67 | 55 | Oleksandr Koniaiev | Ukraine | -2 LAP | |
| 68 | 78 | Oskars Muižnieks | Latvia | -2 LAP | |
| 69 | 64 | Roberto Burta | Romania | -2 LAP | |
| 70 | 58 | Emre Yavuz | Turkey | -3 LAP | |
| 71 | 59 | Zeki Kaygısız | Turkey | -3 LAP | |
| | 41 | Filip Helta | Poland | DNF4 | |
| | 34 | David Nordemann | Netherlands | DNF3 | |
| | 63 | Süleyman Sefa Temel | Turkey | DNF1 | |
| | 70 | Vedad Karic | Bosnia and Herzegovina | DNS | |
| | 76 | Samir Hasani | Kosovo | DNS | |
