= Cycling at the 2024 Summer Olympics – Men's cross-country =

Men's cross-country at the Games of the XXXIII Olympiad
- Olympic mountain bike cycling
- Venue: Colline d'Élancourt
- Date: 29 July 2024
- Competitors: 36 from 28 nations

Medalists
1st place, gold medalist(s)		Tom Pidcock	Great Britain
2nd place, silver medalist(s)		Victor Koretzky	France
3rd place, bronze medalist(s)		Alan Hatherly	South Africa

The men's cross-country mountain biking event at the 2024 Summer Olympics took place at Colline d'Élancourt (Elancourt Hill) which is the highest point in the Paris region. 36 cyclists from 28 nations competed. The gold medal was awarded to the defending 2020 Olympic champion Tom Pidcock.

== Background ==
This was the 8th appearance of the event, which has been held at every Summer Olympics since mountain bike cycling was added to the programme in 1996.

The reigning Olympic champion was Tom Pidcock of Great Britain.

== Competition format ==
The competition was a mass-start, eight-lap race. There was only one round of competition. The mountain bike course was 4.4 kilometres (2.7 mi) long, with sudden changes in elevation, narrow dirt trails, and rocky sections. Riders that were lapped or were slower than 80% of the race leader’s time were eliminated.

== Results ==
Result
Rank	#	Cyclist	Nation	Time	Diff.
1st place, gold medalist(s)	1	Tom Pidcock	Great Britain	1:26:22	
2nd place, silver medalist(s)	2	Victor Koretzky	France	1:26:31	+0:09
3rd place, bronze medalist(s)	5	Alan Hatherly	South Africa	1:26:33	+0:11
4	10	Luca Braidot	Italy	1:26:56	+0:34
5	3	Mathias Flückiger	Switzerland	1:27:42	+1:20
6	15	Samuel Gaze	New Zealand	1:28:03	+1:41
7	7	Riley Amos	United States	1:28:08	+1:46
8	14	Charlie Aldridge	Great Britain	1:28:32	+2:10
9	4	Nino Schurter	Switzerland	1:28:44	+2:22
10	23	David Valero Serrano	Spain	1:28:49	+2:27
11	13	Martín Vidaurre	Chile	1:29:00	+2:38
12	11	Simon Andreassen	Denmark	1:29:05	+2:43
13	9	Christopher Blevins	United States	1:29:06	+2:44
14	6	Jordan Sarrou	France	1:29:08	+2:46
15	19	Julian Schelb	Germany	1:29:08	+2:46
16	8	Luca Schwarzbauer	Germany	1:29:10	+2:48
17	16	Mārtiņš Blūms	Latvia	1:29:11	+2:49
18	20	Pierre de Froidmont	Belgium	1:30:21	+3:59
19	17	Simone Avondetto	Italy	1:30:52	+4:30
20	28	Knut Røhme	Norway	1:30:55	+4:33
21	28	Ulan Bastos Galinski	Brazil	1:30:55	+4:33
22	24	Maximilian Foidl	Austria	1:31:26	+5:04
23	30	Adair Gutierrez Prieto	Mexico	1:31:42	+5:20
24	12	Jofre Cullell Estape	Spain	1:32:13	+5:51
25	22	Ondřej Cink	Czech Republic	1:32:28	+6:06
26	18	Jens Schuermans	Belgium	1:33:29	+7:07
27	29	Krzysztof Łukasik	Poland	1:33:55	+7:33
28	35	Romano Püntener	Liechtenstein	1:34:33	+8:11
29	26	Tomer Zaltsman	Israel	1:34:47	+8:25
30	25	Gunnar Holmgren	Canada	1:34:57	+8:35
31	31	Diego Arias	Colombia	1:35:13	+8:51
32	27	Oleksandr Hudyma	Ukraine	—	-1 LAP
33	34	Mi Jiujiang	China	—	-2 LAP
34	33	Ede-Károly Molnár	Romania	—	-6 LAP
	32	Alex Miller	Namibia	DNF	
	36	Joni Savaste	Finland	DNF	
