= Eday (disambiguation) =

Eday or variants may refer to:

- Eday, one of the islands of Orkney, Scotland
- eDay, an electronic waste initiative in New Zealand
- E-Day, a military designation of days and hours
- El Día E ('E-Day'), Spanish Language Day
- Flugplatz Strausberg, Germany, ICAO airport EDAY
- Niño Martin Eday (born 1993), Filipino mountain biker
- Gears of War: E-Day, video game by Xbox Game Studios
