= El Día E =

Spanish cultural festival

- Genre: International holiday
- Date: Saturday closest to the summer solstice
- Venue: Centers of the Instituto Cervantes
- Country: Spain
- Inaugurated: 2009
- Organiser: Instituto Cervantes

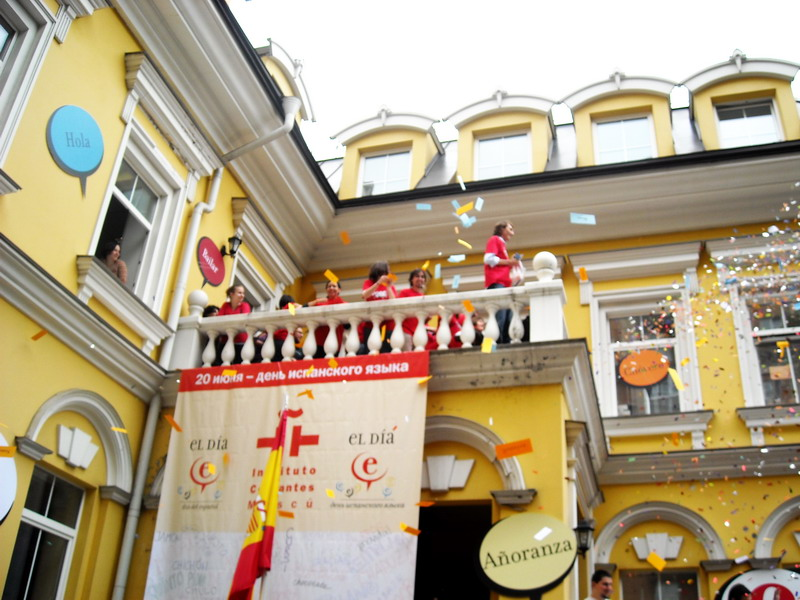
A celebration of El Día E in Moscow, 2009

El Día E ('E-Day') or El Día del Español ('Spanish Language Day') is a festive commemoration promoted by the Instituto Cervantes since 2009, which takes place on the Saturday closest to the solstice of June, and whose objective is to spread the culture of Spanish, celebrate its importance in the world and foster the unity of its speakers.

== Motivation ==
More than 500 million people speak Spanish. Spanish is the second language in the world in number of native speakers and the second language of international communication. 7.9% of Internet users communicate in Spanish, where it is the third most used language. The use of Spanish on the Internet has experienced a growth of 1,123% between the years 2000 and 2013. Spanish is the second most important language on Wikipedia by number of visits.

== Acts ==
On Spanish Day, the Instituto Cervantes centers around the world organize various events and proposals related to Spanish and Hispanic culture, including concerts, exhibitions, conferences, «raining words» and visits to the Caja de las Letras. At the same time, participatory activities are launched on the Internet, such as choosing a favorite Spanish word, games related to the language or narrative contests.

== Editions ==
Edition	Date	Favorite word	Notes
1st	June 20, 2009	Malevo	Means "evildoer" in slang lunfardo of Buenos Aires.
2nd	June 19, 2010	(vacante)	Most voted: arrebañar, cachivache, gamusino, infinito, limón, república, sueño, tiquismiquis, titipuchal y tragaldabas.
3rd	June 18, 2011	Querétaro	Suggested by Gael García Bernal and chosen among 35 candidates proposed by two Spanish-speaking personalities.
4th	June 23, 2012		No favorite word contest was held
5th	June 22, 2013		No favorite word contest was held
6th	June 21, 2014		No favorite word contest was held
7th	June 20, 2015		No favorite word contest was held
8th	June 20, 2016		No favorite word contest was held
9th	June 24, 2017		
10th	June 23, 2018		
11th	June 22, 2019		
12th	May 21, 2021		
13th	June 3, 2023		
