= Cycling at the 2023 Pan American Games – Women's cross-country =

Women's cross-country at the 2023 Pan American Games
- Venue: San Cristóbal Metropolitan Park
- Date: 21 October 2023
- Competitors: 18 from 10 nations
- Winning time: 1:20:35

Medalists
Gold medal	Jennifer Jackson	Canada
Silver medal	Catalina Vidaurre	Chile
Bronze medal	Raiza Goulão	Brazil

The women's cross-country competition of the cycling events at the 2023 Pan American Games was held on 21 October 2023 at the San Cristóbal Metropolitan Park in Santiago, Chile.

== Schedule ==
Date	Time	Round
21 October 2023	11:30	Final

== Results ==
Rank	Rider	Nation	Time
1st place, gold medalist(s)	Jennifer Jackson	Canada	1:20:35
2nd place, silver medalist(s)	Catalina Vidaurre	Chile	1:23:20
3rd place, bronze medalist(s)	Raiza Goulão	Brazil	1:24:57
4	Agustina Apaza	Argentina	1:25:51
5	Karen Fernandes	Brazil	1:27:00
6	Ana María Roa	Colombia	1:29:03
7	Sandra Walter	Canada	1:30:48
8	Adriana Rojas	Costa Rica	1:31:30
9	Gloria Garzón	Colombia	1:31:35
10	Erika Rodriguez	Mexico	-1 LAP
11	Florinda de León Rodríguez	Independent Athletes Team	-1 LAP
12	Angie Lara	Colombia	-2 LAP
13	Ines Gutierrez	Argentina	-2 LAP
14	Isabella Gómez	Costa Rica	-3 LAP
15	Yarela González	Chile	-5 LAP
	Daniela Campuzano	Mexico	DNF
