= Cycling at the 2022 Asian Games – Men's cross-country =

Men's cross-country at the 2022 Asian Games
- Venue: Chun'an Jieshou Sports Centre
- Date: 25 September 2023
- Competitors: 17 from 11 nations

Medalists
gold medal	Mi Jiujiang	China
silver medal	Yuan Jinwei	China
bronze medal	Toki Sawada	Japan

The men's cross country competition at the 2022 Asian Games was held on 25 September 2023 at the Chun'an Jieshou Sports Centre.

== Schedule ==
All times are China Standard Time (UTC+08:00)

Date	Time	Event
Monday, 25 September 2023	13:30	Final

== Results ==
Legend

- DNF — Did not finish
- DNS — Did not start

Rank	Athlete	Time
1st place, gold medalist(s)	Mi Jiujiang (CHN)	1:32:27
2nd place, silver medalist(s)	Yuan Jinwei (CHN)	1:35:49
3rd place, bronze medalist(s)	Toki Sawada (JPN)	1:40:27
4	Feri Yudoyono (INA)	1:41:50
5	Denis Sergiyenko (KAZ)	1:43:06
6	Yegor Karassyov (KAZ)	1:43:51
7	Zaenal Fanani (INA)	1:45:07
8	Lai Chun Kin (HKG)	1:49:59
9	Riyadh Hakim (SGP)	1:54:04
10	Chun Sung-hun (KOR)	−1 lap
11	Phunsiri Sirimongkhon (THA)	−1 lap
12	Keerati Sukprasart (THA)	−2 laps
—	Heo Seung-soo (KOR)	DNF
—	Suraj Rana Magar (NEP)	DNF
—	Edmhel John Flores (PHI)	DNS
—	Jerico Rivera (PHI)	DNS
—	Khalifa Al-Kaabi (UAE)	DNS
