= Ruben Scheire =

Belgian cyclist

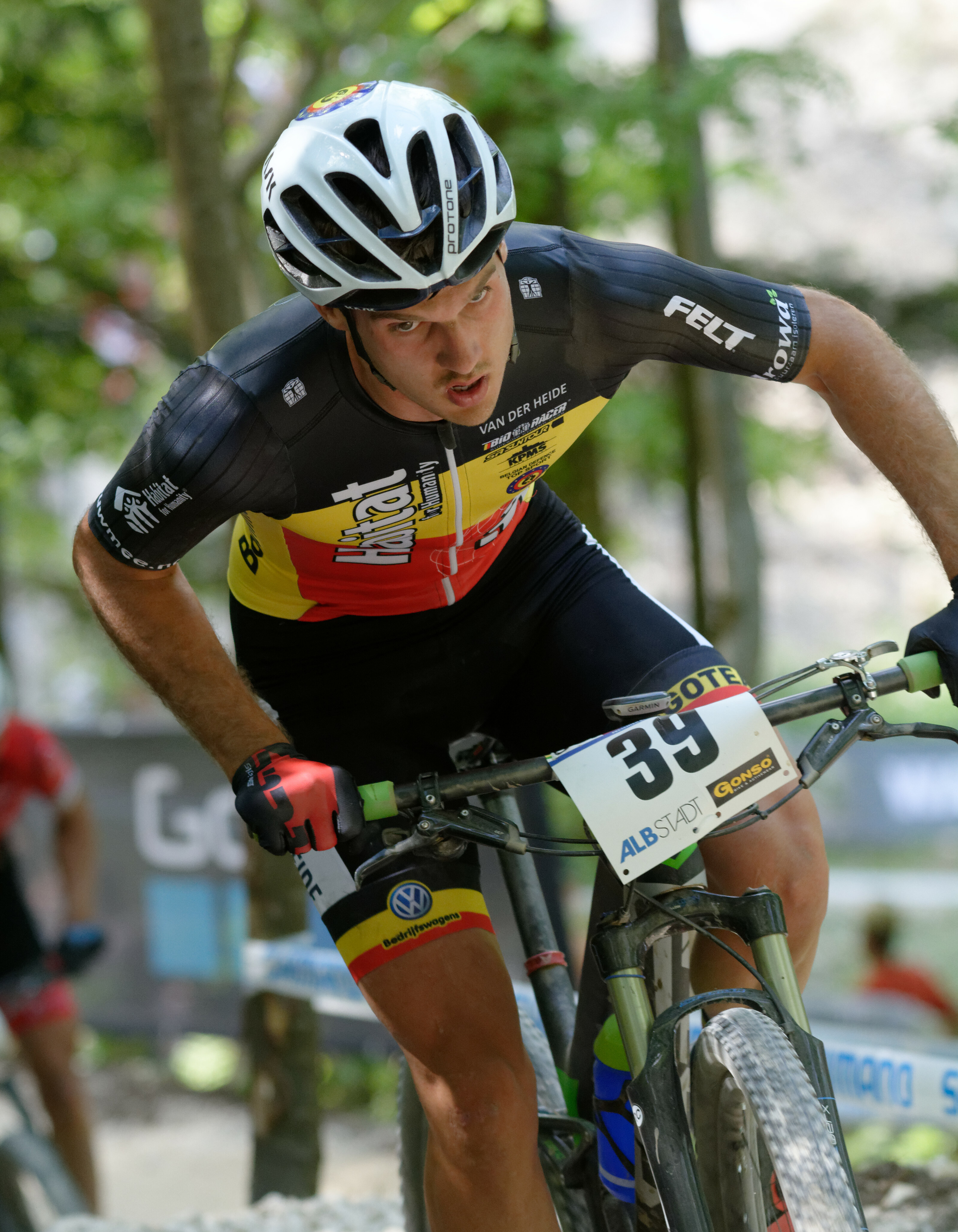
- Ruben Scheire at the MTB World Cup in 2017

Personal information
- Born: 6 December 1991 (age 34) Ghent, Belgium

Cycling career
- Sport: Cycling
- Discipline: Mountain bike
- Role: Rider

Ruben Scheire (born 6 December 1991) is a Belgian mountain bike racer. He rode at the cross-country event at the 2016 Summer Olympics.

Sporting positions
Preceded by Sven Nys	Belgian Mountainbike Champion; 2016	Succeeded by Jens Schuermans
