= Colline d'Élancourt =

Hill in Yvelines, France

- Colline de la Revanche
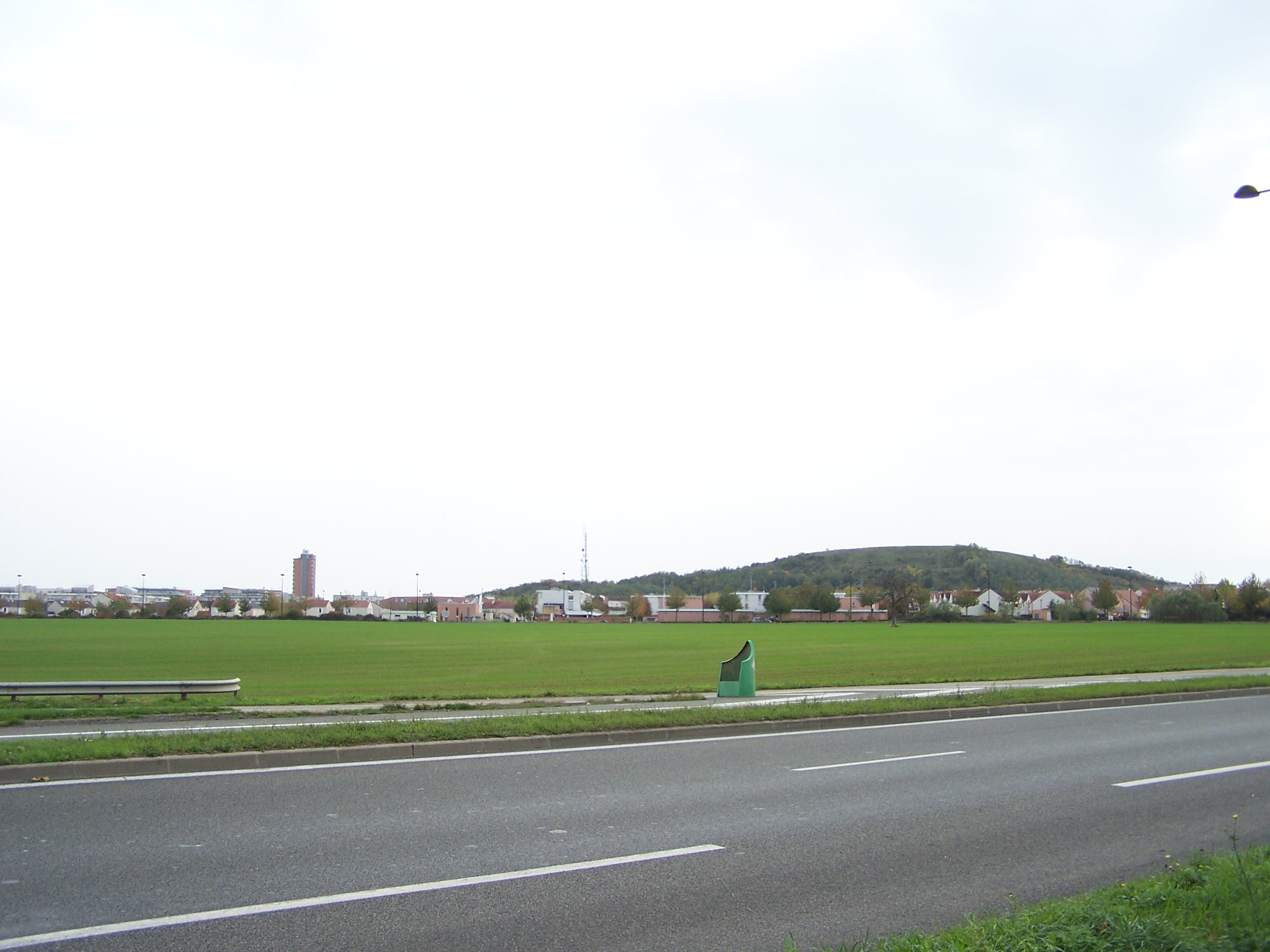
- Neighbourhood of Clef de Saint-Pierre and Colline d'Élancourt

Highest point
- Elevation: 231 m (758 ft)
- Prominence: 69 m (226 ft)
- Coordinates: 48°47′18″N 1°58′05″E

Geography
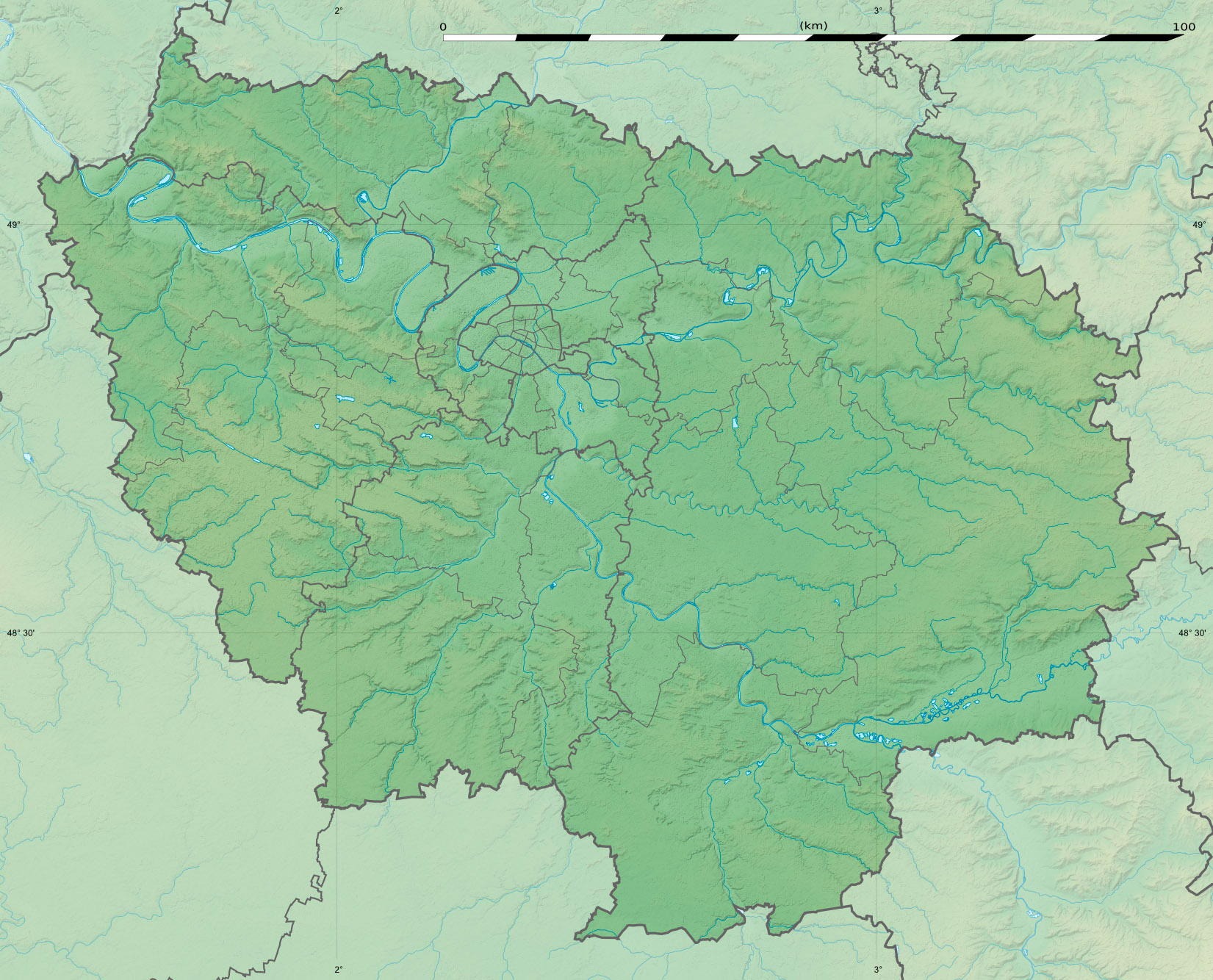
- Location within Île-de-France (region)
- Country: France
- Region: Yvelines

Colline d'Élancourt, previously known Colline de la Revanche, is a hill located in Élancourt in the French department of Yvelines. With a height of 231 meters above sea level, it is the highest point in Yvelines and Île-de-France.

The Eiffel Tower, Montparnasse Tower, La Défense, Étang de Saint-Quentin and Meudon Forest are visible from the top of the hill. Colline d'Élancourt was chosen to host the mountain biking events during the 2024 Summer Olympics in Paris.

The artificial hill is located at the site of former sandstone quarries that supplied materials for construction. After the quarries closed in the middle of 19th century, the site was used as a landfill until 1975. In the 1980s the hill was transformed into a public park.

== Toponymy ==
The name of the place called La Revanche first appeared in 1881. In 2004, the municipal council of Élancourt in 2004 changed the name of the hill to Colline d'Élancourt.
