= Joni Savaste =

Finnish mountain biker (born 2004)

Personal information
- Born: 22 February 2004 (age 22)

Cycling career
- Sport: Cycling
- Discipline: Mountain biking

Joni Savaste (born 22 February 2004) is a Finnish mountain biker. He competed in the men's cross-country event at the 2024 Summer Olympics.
