= Luca Braidot =

Italian mountain bike racer

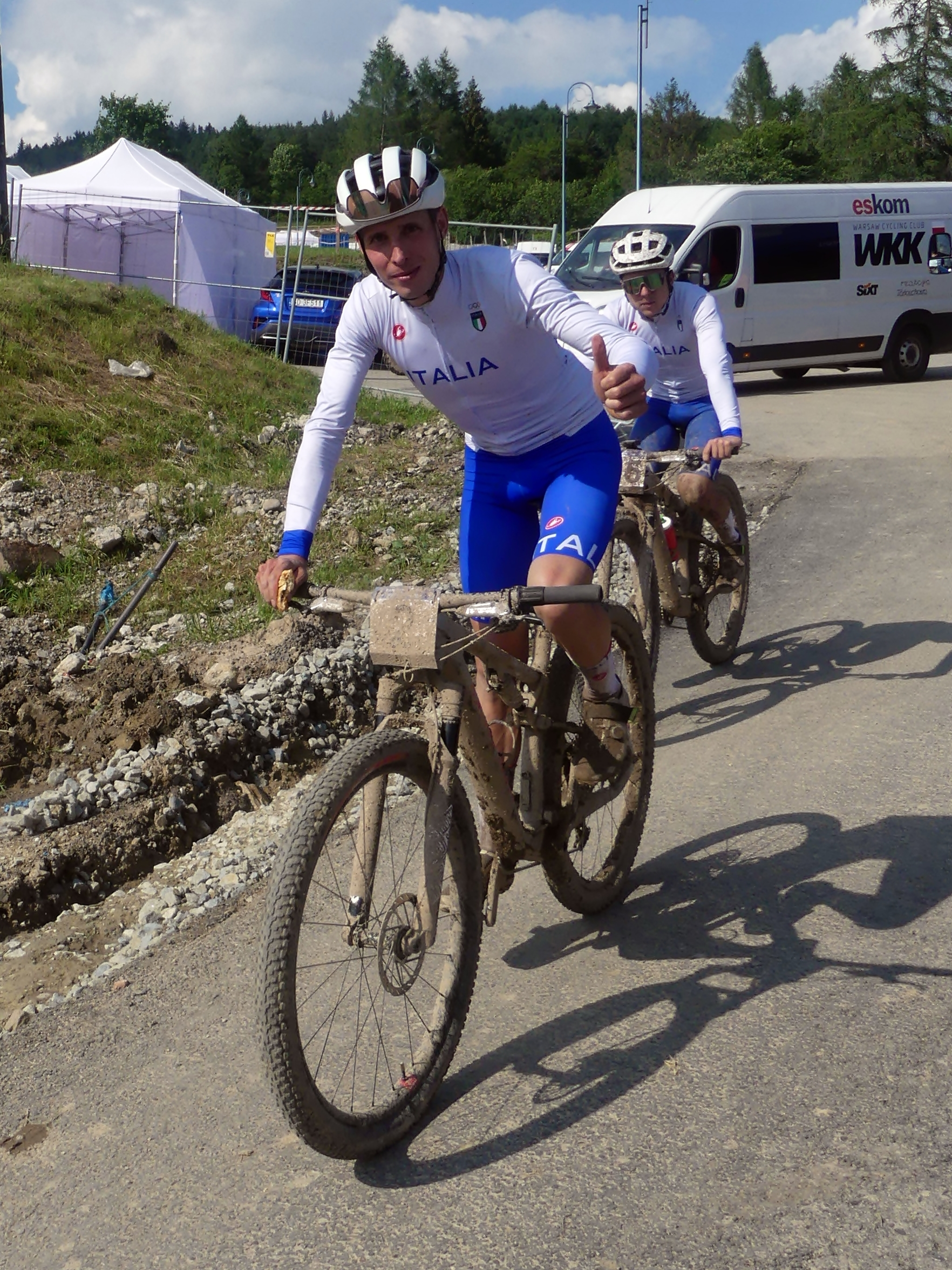
- Braidot in European Games 2023, Poland

Personal information
- Born: 29 May 1991 (age 35) Gorizia, Italy
- Height: 1.79 m (5 ft 10 in)
- Weight: 69 kg (152 lb)

Cycling career
- Sport: Cycling
- Current team: CS Carabinieri–Cicli Olympia–Vittoria
- Disciplines: Mountain bike; Cyclo-cross
- Role: Rider

Amateur team
- 2018: Centro Sportivo Carabinieri

Professional team
- 2019–: CS Carabinieri–Cicli–Olympia

Major wins
- Cyclo-cross National Championships (2018) Mountain bike National XC Championships (2014, 2023, 2024) XC World Cup 2 individual wins (2022)
Medal record
Men's mountain bike racing
Representing Italy
World Championships
Gold medal – first place	2012 Saalfelden-Leogang	Mixed relay
Silver medal – second place	2020 Leogang	Mixed relay
Silver medal – second place	2022 Les Gets	Mixed relay
Bronze medal – third place	2022 Les Gets	Cross-country
Bronze medal – third place	2024 Vallnord	Mixed relay
European Games
Bronze medal – third place	2023 Kraków-Małopolska	Cross-country
European Championships
Gold medal – first place	2012 Moscow	Mixed relay
Gold medal – first place	2018 Graz-Stattegg	Mixed relay
Gold medal – first place	2020 Monteceneri	Mixed relay
Gold medal – first place	2021 Novi Sad	Mixed relay
Silver medal – second place	2018 Glasgow	Cross-country
Silver medal – second place	2019 Brno	Mixed relay
Bronze medal – third place	2012 Moscow	U23 cross-country
Bronze medal – third place	2023 Krynica-Zdrój	Cross-country
Bronze medal – third place	2024 Cheile Grădiștei	Cross-country short track

Luca Braidot (born 29 May 1991) is an Italian professional mountain bike and cyclo-cross cyclist. He rode at the cross-country event at the 2016 Summer Olympics, where he finished 7th. At the 2018 European Mountain Bike Championships, he finished 2nd in the cross-country event.

His twin brother Daniele is also a professional cyclist.

== Major results ==
=== Cyclo-cross ===
2007–2008
2nd Ciclocross del Ponte Juniors
2nd GP Città di Verbania Juniors
2008–2009
2nd Ciclocross del Ponte Juniors
2nd GP Città San Martino Juniors
6th UCI Junior World Championships
2010–2011
2nd National Under-23 Championships
2011–2012
3rd National Under-23 Championships
2014–2015
3rd National Championships
2016–2017
2nd Trofeo di Gorizia
2nd Gran Premio Città di Vittorio Veneto
2nd Trof.Cop.ed.Brugherio82
3rd National Championships
2017–2018
1st National Championships
2018–2019
2nd National Championships
3rd Ciclocross del Ponte

=== Mountain bike ===
2012
1st Team relay, UCI World Championships
UEC European Championships

1st Team relay
3rd Under-23 Cross-country

2014
1st Cross-country, National Championships
2018
UEC European Championships

1st Team relay
2nd Cross-country

2019
2nd Team relay, UEC European Championships
3rd Tokyo 2020 Test Event
2021
1st Team relay, UEC European Championships
2022
3rd Overall UCI XCO World Cup

1st Lenzerheide
1st Vallnord
3rd Snowshoe

Internazionali d'Italia Series

1st Capoliveri
1st La Thuile
2nd San Zeno di Montagna

UCI World Championships

2nd Team relay
3rd Cross-country

3rd Cross-country, National Championships
UCI XCC World Cup

3rd Snowshoe
3rd Val di Sole

2023
National Championships

1st Cross-country
1st Short track

Internazionali d'Italia Series

1st San Zeno di Montagna
1st Esanatoglia

3rd Cross-country, UEC European Championships
2024
1st Cross-country, National Championships
UCI XCO World Cup

3rd Crans-Montana
4th Val di Sole
4th Les Gets

UCI XCC World Cup

3rd Crans-Montana

4th Cross-country, Olympic Games
