= Ulan Bastos Galinski =

Brazilian mountain biker

Shanayah Howell
Personal information
- Born: 19 June 1998 (age 28) Palmeiras, Brazil

Cycling career
- Sport: Cycling
- Discipline: Mountain biking

Amateur team
- Caloi Henrique Avancini Racing

Ulan Bastos Galinski (born 19 June 1998) is a Brazilian mountain biker. He competed in the men's cross-country event at the 2024 Summer Olympics.

== Major results ==
2022
2nd Cross-country, National Championships
2023
2nd Cross-country, National Championships
2024
National Championships

1st Cross-country
2nd Cross-country short track
