= Mi Jiujiang =

Chinese mountain biker

Personal information
- Born: 8 May 1992 (age 34) Zhenyuan, China

Cycling career
- Sport: Cycling
- Discipline: Mountain biking

Mi Jiujiang (born 8 May 1992) is a Chinese mountain biker. He competed in the men's cross-country event at the 2024 Summer Olympics.

== Major results ==
2022
3rd Cross-country, National Championships
2023
1st Cross-Country, Asian Games
2024
1st Cross-country, National Championships
