= Adair Prieto =

Mexican mountain biker

Adair Gutiérrez
Personal information
- Full name: Adair Zabdiel Gutiérrez Prieto
- Born: 7 January 2001 (age 25) Rincón de Romos, Mexico

Cycling career
- Sport: Cycling
- Discipline: Mountain biking

Adair Zabdiel Gutiérrez Prieto (born 7 January 2001) is a Mexican mountain biker. He competed in the men's cross-country event at the 2024 Summer Olympics.

== Major results ==
=== MTB ===
2021
2nd Cross-country short track, National Championships
