= Étang de Saint-Quentin =

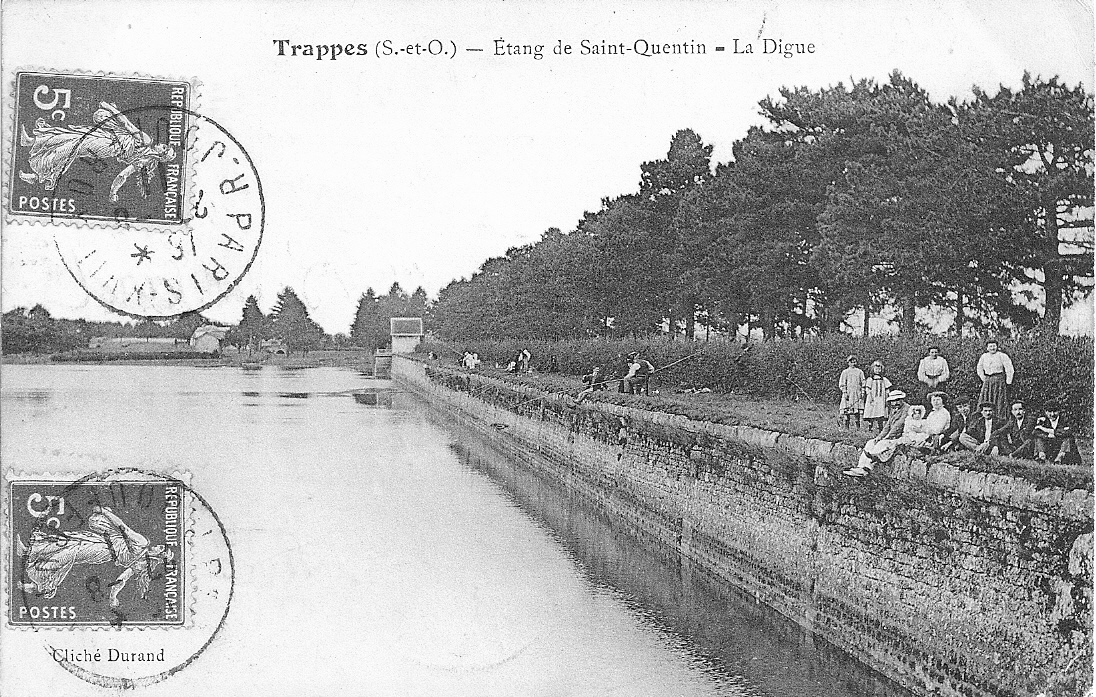

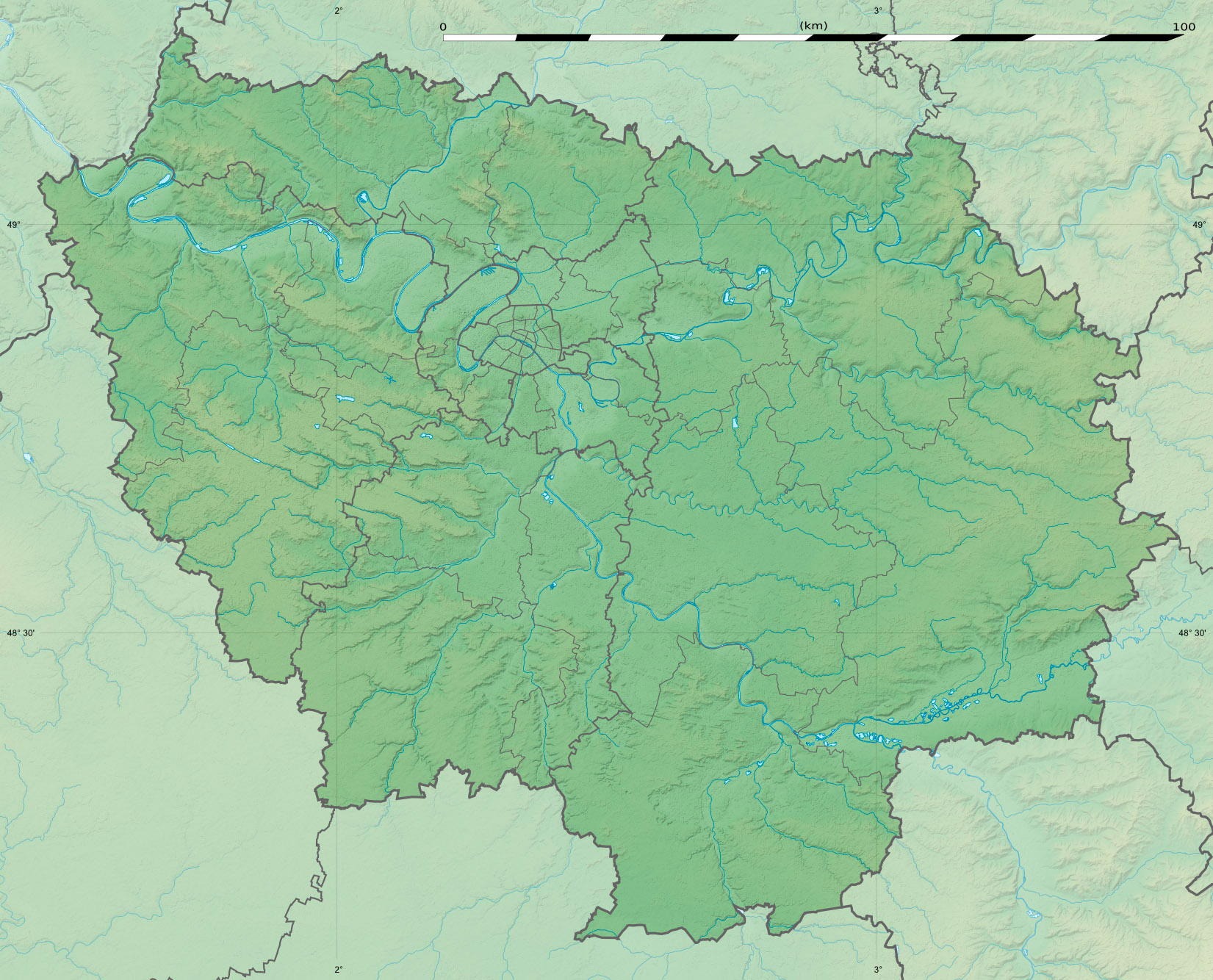
- Location within Île-de-France (region)
- Location: Yvelines
- Coordinates: 48.7878°N 2.0097°E
- Type: reservoir
- Basin countries: France
- Surface area: 2.5 km^{2} (0.97 sq mi)
- Surface elevation: 160 m (520 ft)

The Étang de Saint-Quentin, or pond of Trappes, is the largest body of fresh water in Yvelines with a surface of approximately 2.5 km². It on in the perimeter of the new town of Saint-Quentin-in-Yvelines, in the commune of Trappes and Montigny-le-Bretonneux. The lake an important base of outdoor recreation. To the west of the lake a national natural reserve of 0.87 km² was established in 1986.

The Étang de Saint-Quentin is an artificial lake created by Sebastien Prestre, Lord of Vauban in 1685 to form part of an engineering work intended to feed water, by gravity, to the park of Versailles. The lake is 160 metres above sea level. A series of drains and aqueducts connected the lake to other ponds upstream, and downstream to the park of the castle of Versailles, at 110 metres above sea level. The construction of the new city demolished the aqueducts to Versailles.
