= Jennifer Jackson (cyclist) =

Canadian cyclist

Jenn Jackson
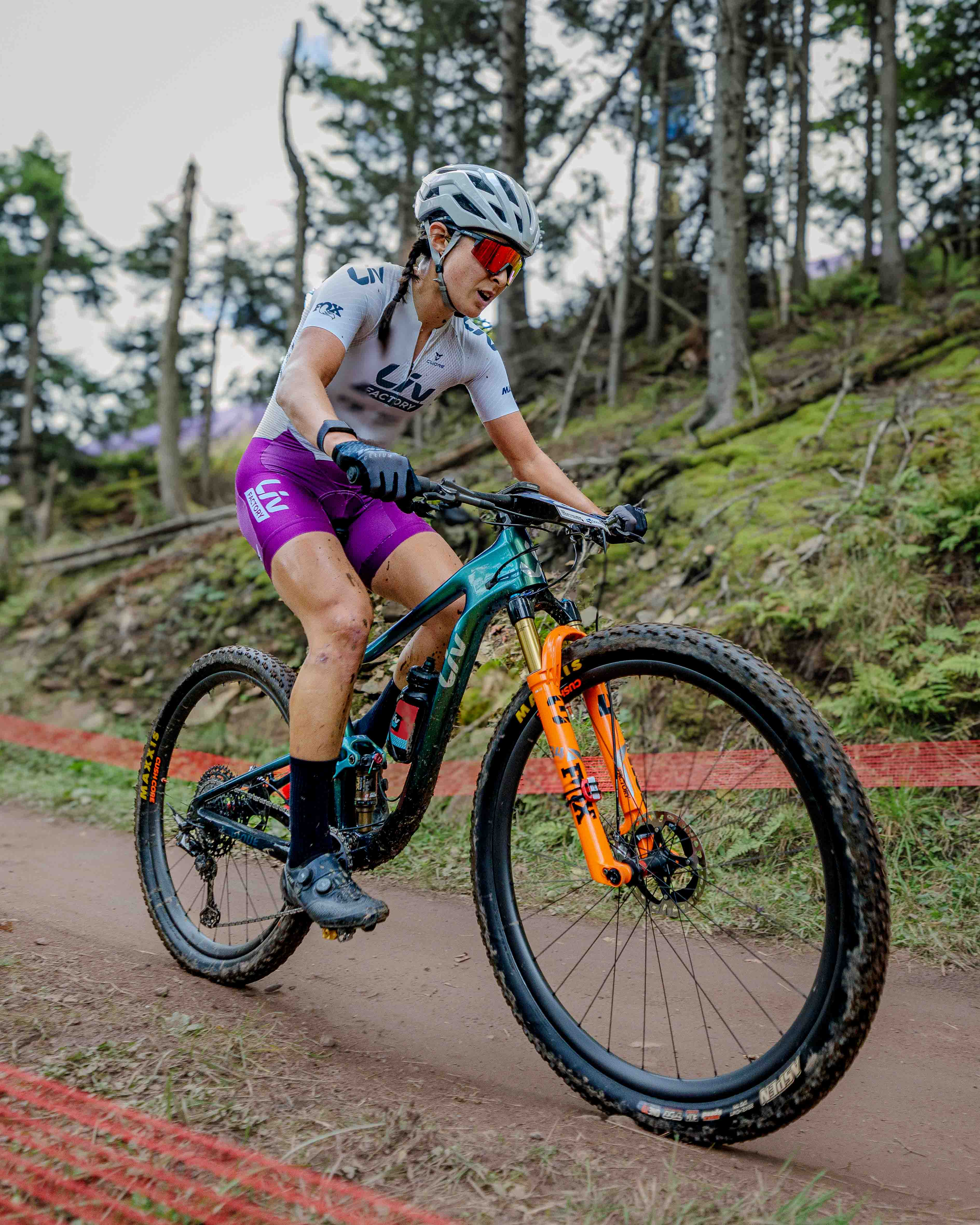
- Jenn Jackson competes in the short track (XCC) event at the 2023 UCI Mountain Bike World Cup in Snowshoe, West Virginia.

Personal information
- Full name: Jennifer Jackson
- Born: February 20, 1995 (age 31) Toronto, Ontario

Cycling career
- Sport: Cycling
- Current team: Orbea Fox Factory Team
- Disciplines: Mountain biking; Cyclo-cross
- Role: Rider
Medal record
Representing Canada
Women's Mountain bike racing
Pan American Games
| Gold medal – first place | 2023 Santiago | Cross-country |

Jennifer Jackson (born February 20, 1995) is a Canadian cross-country mountain biker and cyclo-cross cyclist. She won the cross-country race at the 2023 Pan American Games in Santiago. She is a three-time Canadian National Champion in cross-country (2021, 2023, 2024), and won the Under-23 event in 2017. In 2024, she earned a triple crown of National titles by winning all three major cross country disciplines: cross-country Olympic, cross-country short track, and cross-country marathon. Jackson was born in Toronto and grew up in Barrie, Ontario, though she currently resides in Duncan, British Columbia.

== Major results ==
=== Mountain bike ===
2024
1st Cross-country, Canadian National Championships
1st Cross-country short track, Canadian National Championships
1st Cross-country marathon, Canadian National Championships
2023
1st Cross-country, Pan American Games
1st Cross-country, Canadian National Championships

2021

1st Cross-country, Canadian National Championships

2017

1st Cross-country, Under-23 Canadian National Championships
