= Caja de las Letras =

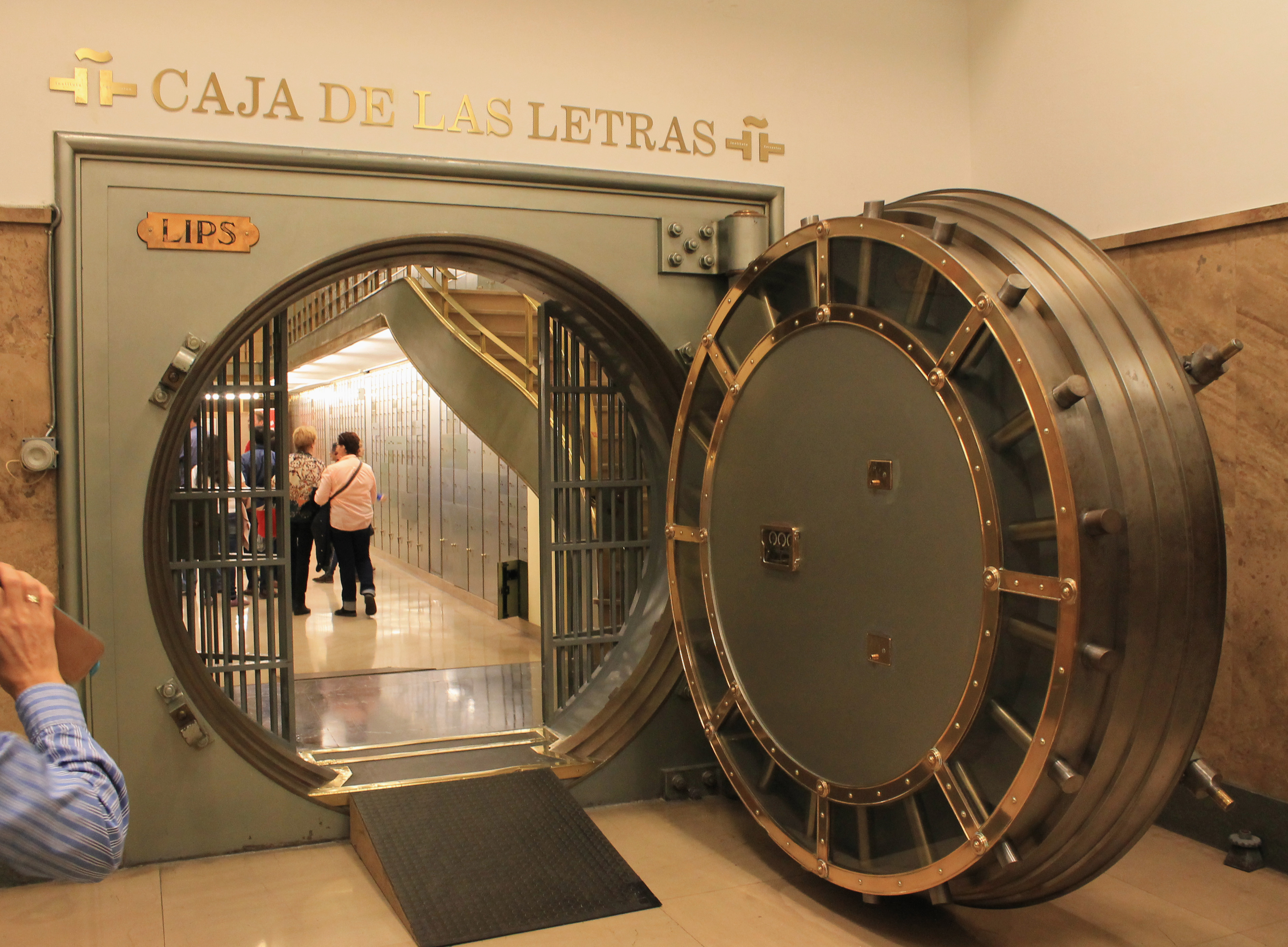
Entrance to the Caja de las Letras

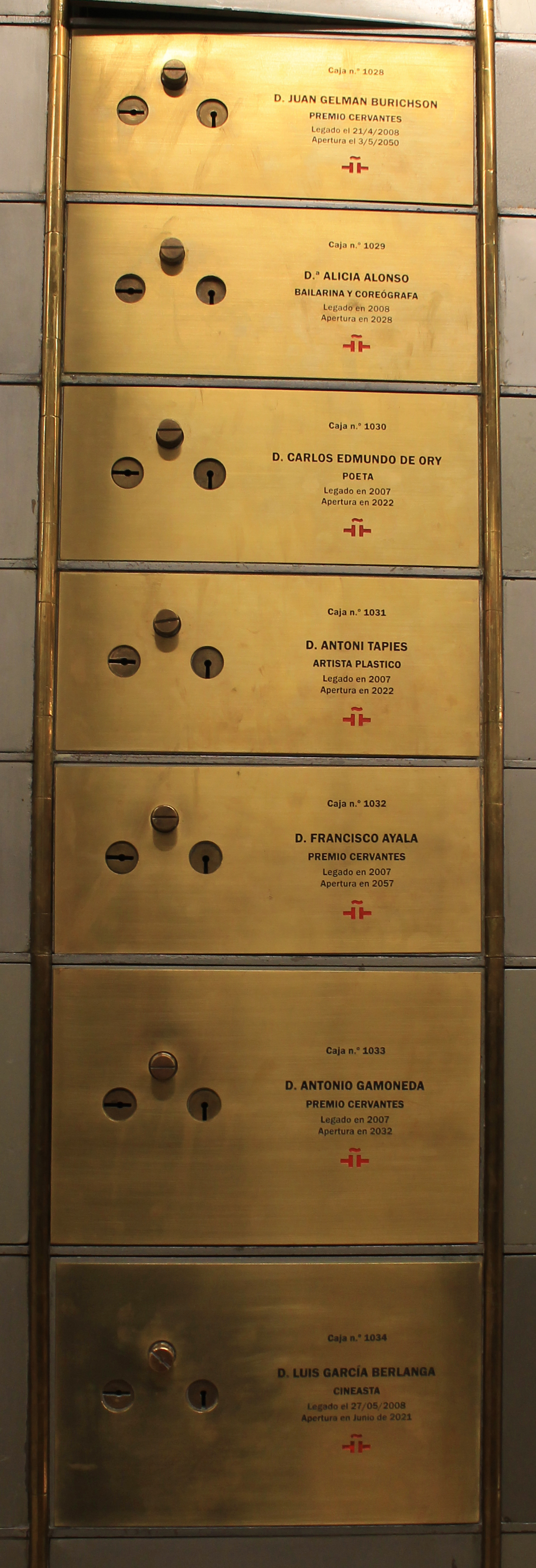
Some of the boxes

The Instituto Cervantes, taking advantage of the presence of the vault in the basement of its headquarters (Caryatid Building) in Madrid (Spain), uses safe deposit boxes for great figures of Hispanic culture to deposit a legacy that will not be opened until the date they decide. Said compartments would thus perform the functions of a time capsule. The aforementioned building has a vault for having been the former headquarters of the Spanish Central Bank.

Donor	Date	Opening date	Box no.
Francisco Ayala	February 15, 2007	2057	1032
Antonio Gamoneda	April 20, 2007	2032	1033
Antoni Tàpies	October 9, 2007	2022	1031
Carlos Edmundo de Ory	November 6, 2007	2022	1030
Proyecto Fahrenheit 451	November 22, 2007	2040	451
Margarita Salas	February 27, 2008	2018	1568
Alicia Alonso	April 17, 2008	2028	1029
Juan Gelman	April 25, 2008	May 3, 2050	1028
Luis García Berlanga	May 27, 2008	June 2021	1034
Pilar de Valderrama	July 13, 2022	No opening date	1440
Alejandra Pizarnik	January 22, 2019	No opening date	1449
Cristóbal Halffter	January 15, 2009	2033	1551
Ana María Matute	March 12, 2009	July 26, 2029	1526
Manuel Alexandre	February 18, 2009	November 11, 2017	1534
Juan Marsé	April 21, 2009	April 21, 2029	1533
José Emilio Pacheco	April 21, 2010	April 21, 2110	1525
José Manuel Caballero Bonald	June 7, 2010	November 11, 2051	1543
Carmen Balcells	March 21, 2011	March 21, 2012	1569
Nuria Espert	May 16, 2011	June 11, 2035	1550
Víctor Ullate	June 6, 2011	June 6, 2161	1560
Elena Poniatowska	April 21, 2014	April 21, 2024	1515
Juan Goytisolo	April 21, 2015	January 5, 2031	1500
Fernando del Paso	April 21, 2016	April 1, 2116	1501
Eduardo Mendoza	April 21, 2017	April 21, 2037	1484
John Elliott	October 24, 2017	June 23, 2037	1492
José Balza	September 19, 2019	September 19, 2059	1189
Les Luthiers	October 10, 2019	September 4, 2042	1224
José Hierro	February 22, 2022	No opening date	1636
María Victoria Atencia	March 22, 2022	March 22, 2072	1004
Carmen Castellote	April 23, 2022	No opening date	1020
Antonio y Manuel Machado	February 9, 2020	No opening date	1722
Andrés Bello	December 14, 2020	December 14, 2020	1626
Rafael Cadenas	April 25, 2023	No opening date	1287
Leonardo Torres Quevedo	May 5, 2023	No opening date	1275
