= Pierre de Froidmont =

Belgian mountain biker

Personal information
- Born: 7 January 1997 (age 29)
- Height: 1.79 m (5 ft 10 in)
- Weight: 66 kg (146 lb)

Cycling career
- Sport: Cycling
- Current team: Orbea Factory Team
- Discipline: Mountain bike
- Role: Rider

Professional teams
- 2016–2021: Merida Wallonie MTB Team
- 2022: KMC–Orbea
- 2023–: Orbea Factory Team

Pierre de Froidmont (born 7 January 1997) is a Belgian mountain bike racer. He rode in the cross-country event at the 2024 Summer Olympics, where he finished 18th.

== Major results ==
2015
1st Cross-country, National Junior Championships
2021
3rd Cross-country, National Championships
2022
2nd Cross-country, National Championships
2023
National Championships

1st Cross-country
1st Short track

2024
National Championships

1st Cross-country
2nd Short track
