= Krzysztof Łukasik =

Polish mountain biker

Personal information
- Born: 2 November 1993 (age 32)

Cycling career
- Sport: Cycling
- Discipline: Mountain biking

Professional team
- 2019–: JBG2-Cryospace

Krzysztof Łukasik (born 2 November 1993) is a Polish mountain biker. He competed in the men's cross-country event at the 2024 Summer Olympics.

== Major results ==
=== MTB ===
2018
3rd Cross country, National Championships
2019
3rd Cross country, National Championships
2020
1st Cross country, National Championships
2022
2nd Cross country, National Championships
2023
1st Cross country, National Championships
2024
National Championships

1st Cross country
1st Cross country short track
