= Tomer Zaltsman =

Israeli mountain biker

Tomer Zaltsman תומר זלצמן
Personal information
- Born: 19 July 1999 (age 27)

Cycling career
- Sport: Cycling
- Discipline: Mountain biking

Tomer Zaltsman (Hebrew: תומר זלצמן; born 19 July 1999) is an Israeli mountain biker. He competed in the men's cross-country event at the 2024 Summer Olympics.

== Major results ==
=== MTB ===
2018
3rd Cross-country, National Championships
2021
National Championships

1st Cross-country
1st Cross-country short track

2023
1st Cross-country short track, National Championships
2024
1st Cross-country, National Championships
