= Niño Martin Eday =

Filipino mountain biker (born 1993)

Personal information
- Born: 13 April 1993 (age 33) Iloilo City, Philippines
- Height: 5 ft 5 in (165 cm)
- Weight: 69 kg (152 lb)

Cycling career
- Sport: Cycling
- Current team: Commencal Philippines; Bagtas GroundZero
- Disciplines: Four-cross; Enduro; Downhill
- Role: Rider
Medal record
Representing Philippines
Gold medal – first place	2019 UCI National Downhill	Rizal
Gold medal – first place	2018 Mandalay Hill Downhill	Myanmar
Gold medal – first place	2015 Thailand BMX Championships	Thailand

Niño Martin Eday (born 13 April 1993), is a Filipino mountain biker. He was born in, and grew up in, Iloilo City, Philippines. He is specialising in Four-Cross (4X), Enduro and Downhill mountain bike racing and also a former member of the BMX National Team in the Philippines. He began riding BMX at the age of 5 and started mountain biking at the age of 15. He recently won the title of the UCI-DHI National Champion for Men's Elite Category finishing with a record time of "2:34:785" from the 2019 UCI Philippine MTB National Championships race in Rizal, Philippines.

He is currently a brand ambassador for Commencal Philippines and part of the Philippines National MTB Downhill Team since April 2016.
