= Jens Schuermans =

Belgian mountain biker (born 1993)

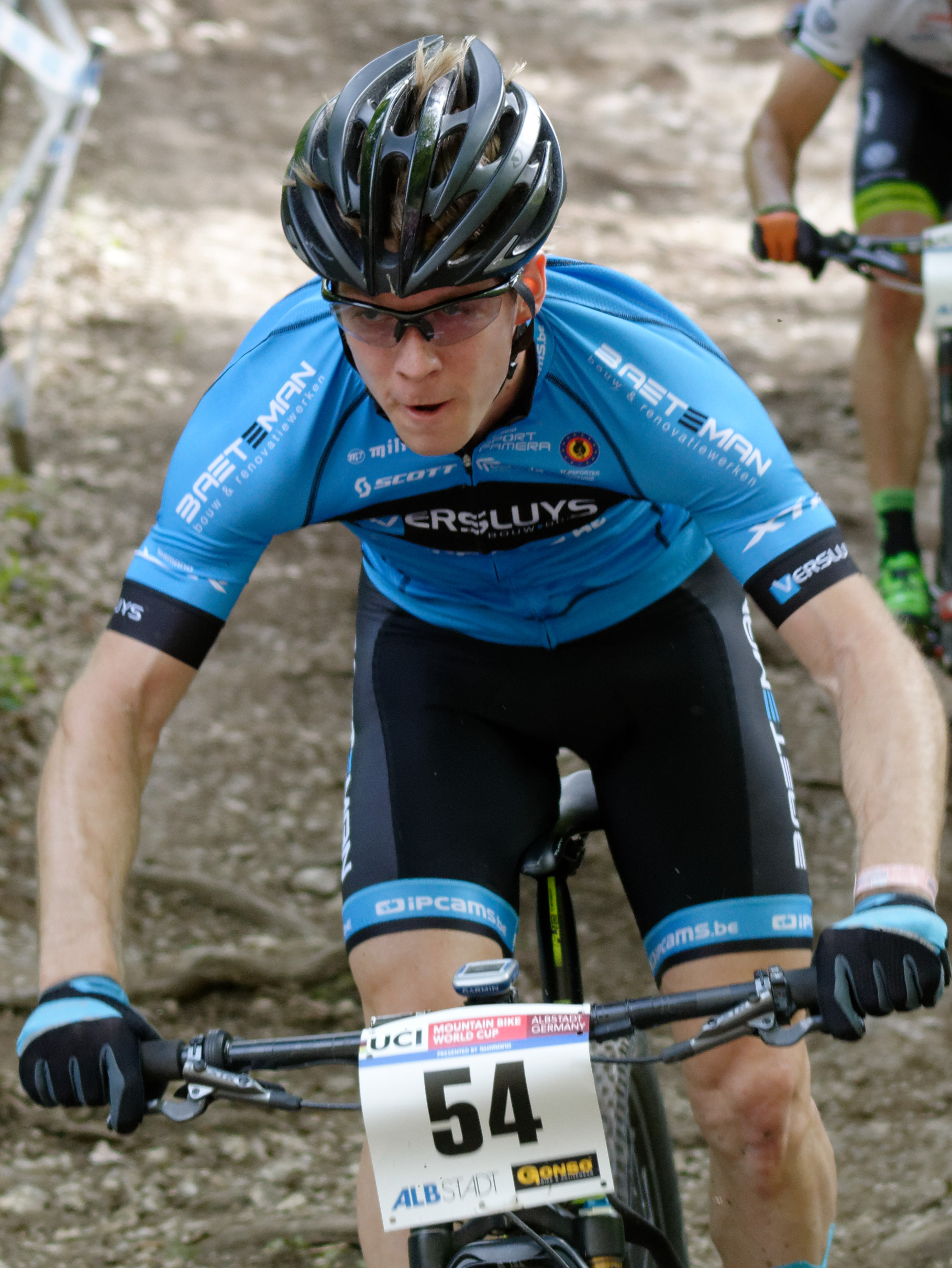
- Jens Schuermans (2016)

Personal information
- Born: 13 February 1993 (age 33) Genk, Belgium
- Height: 1.75 m (5 ft 9 in)
- Weight: 64 kg (141 lb)

Cycling career
- Sport: Cycling
- Disciplines: Mountain bike; Road
- Role: Rider

Amateur teams
- 2010–2011: Merida–Combee
- 2012–2013: Versluys Team
- 2017: Creuse Oxygène Guéret
- 2019: Creuse Oxygène Guéret

Professional teams
- 2013–2014: Team3M
- 2022: BEAT Cycling

Jens Schuermans (born 13 February 1993) is a Belgian mountain bike racer. He rode in the cross-country event at the 2016, 2020 and 2024 Summer Olympics.

== Major results ==
=== Mountain bike ===
2015
3rd Cross-country, UEC European Under-23 Championships
2017
1st Cross-country, National Championships
2018
1st Cross-country, National Championships
2019
1st Cross-country, National Championships
2020
1st Cross-country, National Championships
2021
1st Cross-country, National Championships
2022
1st Cross-country, National Championships
2024
1st Cross-country short track, National Championships
UCI XCC World Cup

3rd Val di Sole

=== Road ===
2012
1st Stage 4 Tour de Namur
2022
4th Overal Flèche du Sud
6th Rutland–Melton CiCLE Classic

Sporting positions
Preceded by Ruben Scheire	Belgian National Cross-country Champion; 2017–2022	Succeeded by incumbent
