= Max Foidl =

Austrian cross-country mountain biker

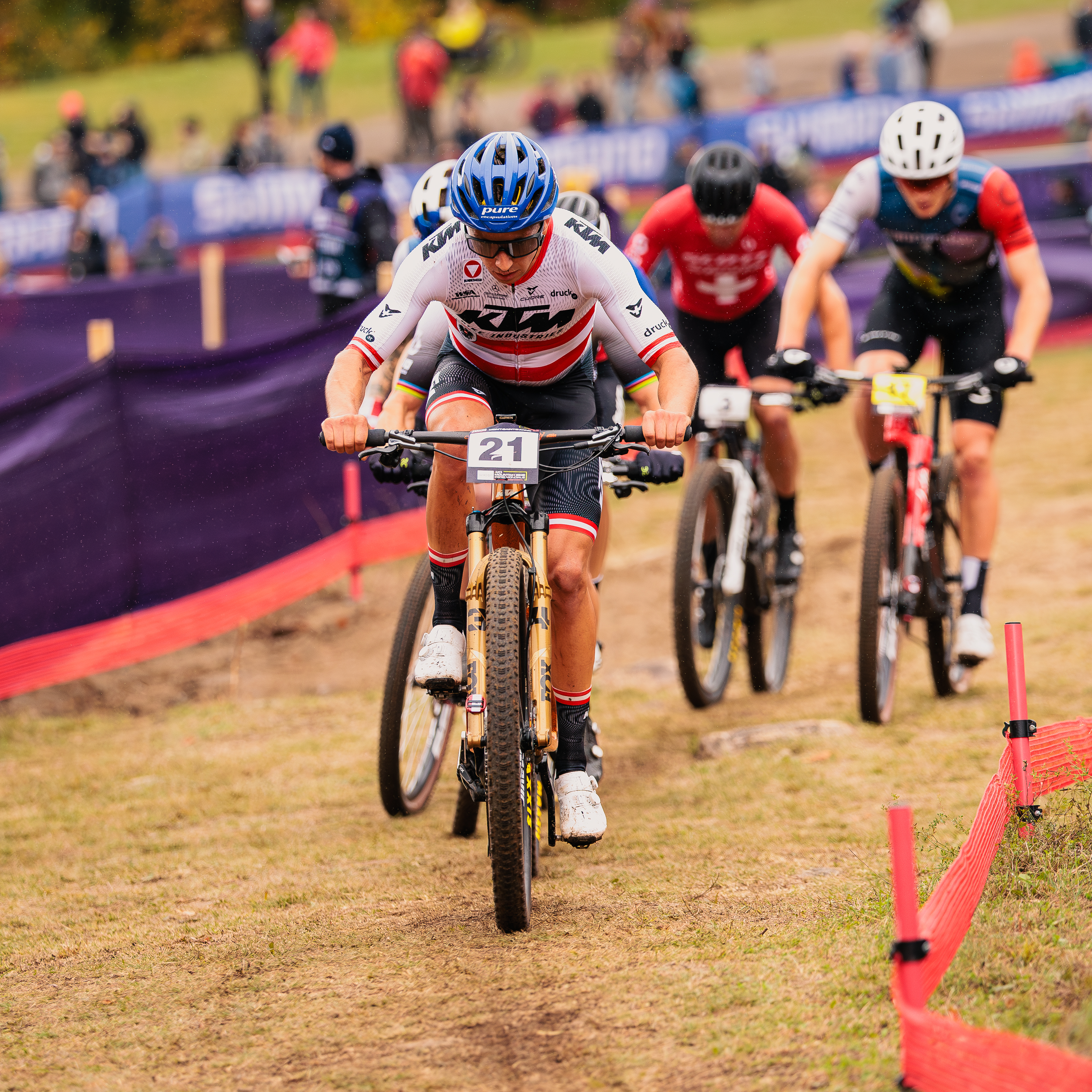

Personal information
- Full name: Maximilian Foidl
- Born: 8 October 1995 (age 31)
- Height: 1.77 m (5 ft 10 in)

Cycling career
- Sport: Cycling
- Current team: KTM Factory MTB Team
- Discipline: Mountain bike
- Role: Rider
- Rider type: Cross-country

Amateur team
- 2012–2013: Muskelkater Genesis Team

Professional teams
- 2018–2020: JB Brunex Felt Factory Team
- 2021–: KTM Factory MTB Team

Maximilian Foidl (born 8 October 1995) is an Austrian cross-country mountain biker. He competed in the cross-country race at the 2020 Summer Olympics, finishing 17th overall.

== Major results ==
2015
1st Cross-country, National Under-23 Championships
2017
1st Cross-country, National Under-23 Championships
2018
2nd Cross-country, National Championships
2020
2nd Cross-country, National Championships
2021
1st Cross-country, National Championships
2022
1st Cross-country, National Championships
2023
1st Cross-country, National Championships
2024
1st Cross-country, National Championships
