= Simone Avondetto =

Italian cyclist (born 2000)

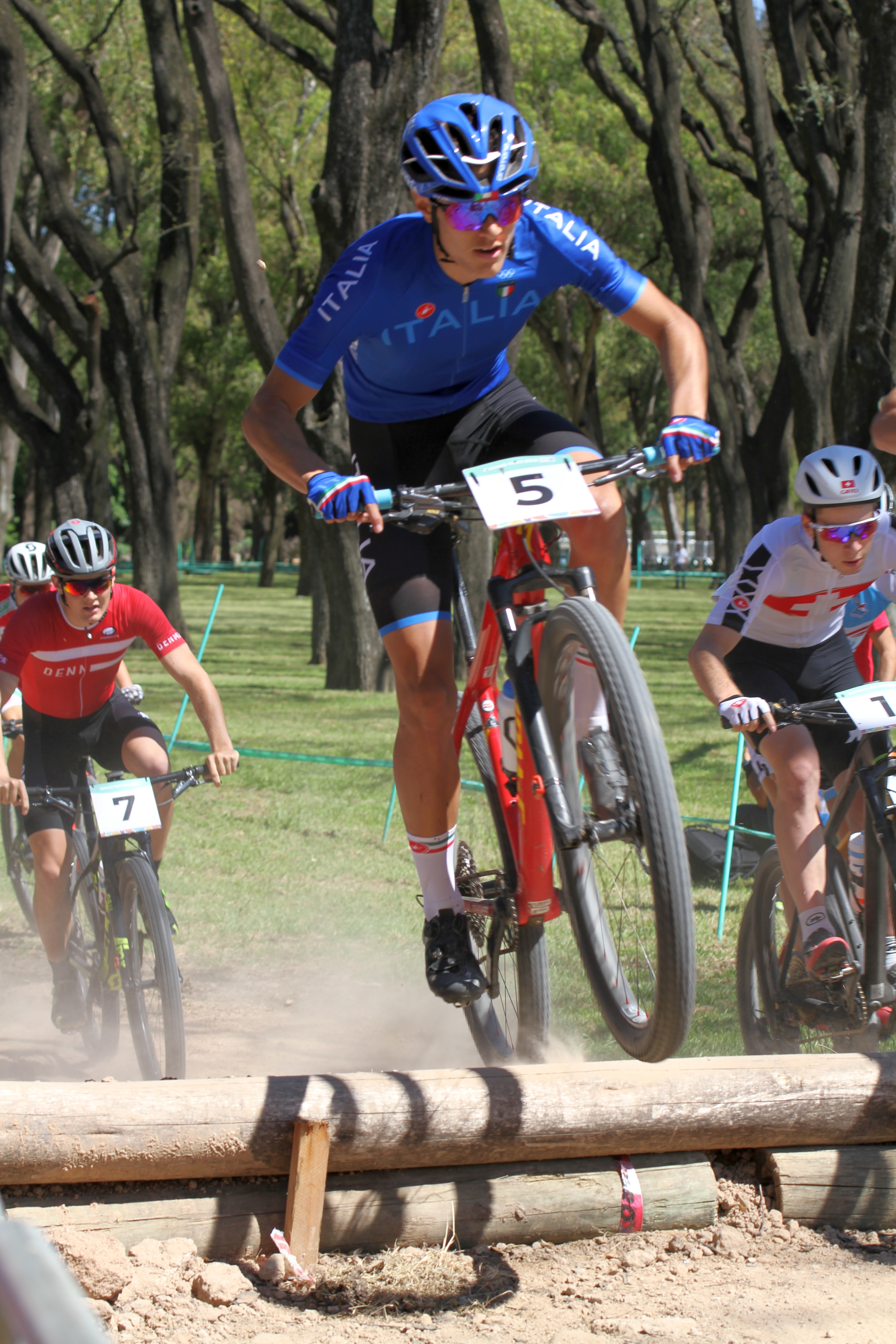
- Avondetto in 2018

Personal information
- Born: 15 April 2000 (age 26) Moncalieri, Italy

Cycling career
- Sport: Cycling
- Current team: Wilier Triestina–Pirelli Factory Team
- Discipline: Mountain bike
- Role: Rider

Amateur teams
- 2017: Team Piemonte FCI
- 2018: Silmax Racing Team

Professional teams
- 2020–2021: Team Trek–Pirelli
- 2022–: Wilier Triestina–Pirelli Factory Team

Major wins
- Mountain bike European XC Championships (2024)
Medal record
Representing Italy
World Championships
Gold medal – first place	2022 Les Gets	Under-23 Cross country
Silver medal – second place	2022 Les Gets	Team relay
European Championships
Gold medal – first place	2024 Cheile Grădiștei	Cross-country
Gold medal – first place	2024 Cheile Grădiștei	Mixed relay

Simone Avondetto (born 15 April 2000) is an Italian cross-country mountain biker. He won the under-23 cross-country race at the 2022 UCI Mountain Bike World Championships.

== Major results ==
2018
1st Cross-country, National Junior Championships
2021
2nd Overall UCI Under-23 XCO World Cup

1st Les Gets
2nd Snowshoe

2022
UCI World Championships

1st Under-23 cross-country
2nd Team relay

1st Cross-country, UEC European Under-23 Championships
UCI Under-23 XCO World Cup

2nd Nové Město
2nd Leogang

2023
Internazionali d'Italia Series

2nd Esanatoglia
3rd Capoliveri

3rd Nals
2024
1st Cross-country, UEC European Championships
1st Short track, National Championships
1st Nals
2nd San Zeno di Montagna
UCI XCO World Cup

5th Les Gets

2025
UCI XCO World Cup

4th Araxá II
