= Mārtiņš Blūms =

Latvian cross-country mountain biker

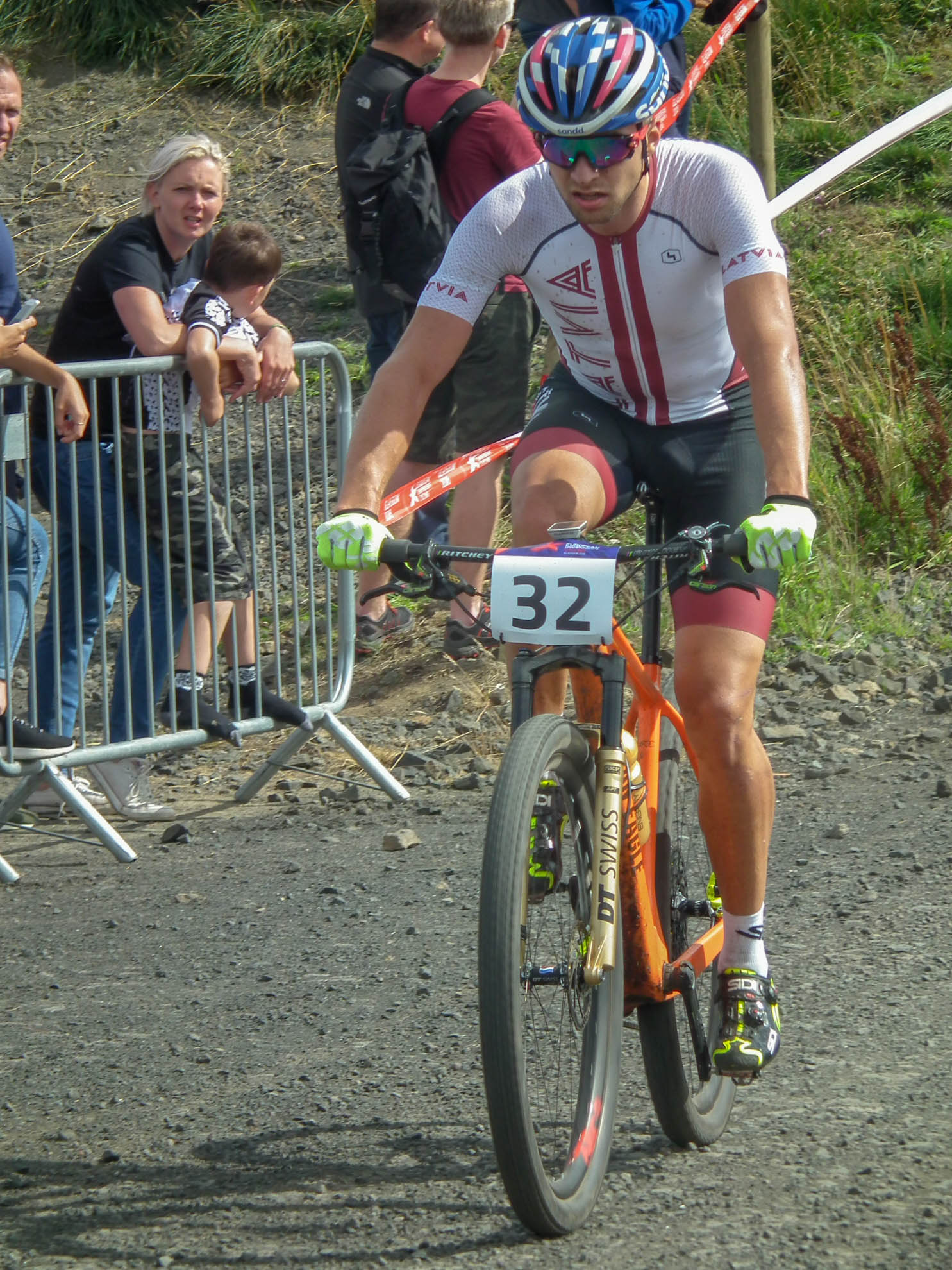
- Blūms in 2018

Personal information
- Born: 17 October 1995 (age 30) Cēsis, Latvia
- Height: 1.83 m (6 ft 0 in)
- Weight: 72 kg (159 lb)

Cycling career
- Sport: Cycling
- Disciplines: Mountain bike Road
- Role: Rider

Mārtiņš Blūms (born 17 October 1995) is a Latvian cross-country mountain biker.

== Major results ==
=== MTB ===
2015
2nd Cross-country, National Championships
2016
1st Cross-country, National Championships
2017
1st Overall UCI Under-23 XCO World Cup

1st Lenzerheide
1st Mont-Sainte-Anne
2nd Nové Město
2nd Val di Sole
3rd Vallnord

National Championships

1st Cross-country marathon
2nd Cross-country, National Championships

2018
2nd Cross-country, National Championships
2019
1st Cross-country, National Championships
1st Sakarya MTB Cup
1st Costa Blanca Bike Race
2020
1st Cross-country, National Championships
2021
1st Cross-country, National Championships
1st Izomat MTB Cup
1st Salamina Epic MTB Race
2022
1st Cross-country, National Championships

=== Road ===
2018
4th Overall Tour of Black Sea

1st Points classification

6th Overall Tour of Cappadocia
