= 2024 UCI Mountain Bike World Cup =

Series of races for all-terrain bicyclists

- Thirty-fifth edition of the UCI Mountain Bike World Cup

Details
- Dates: April–October 2024
- Races: 8 (XCO); 7 (DHI)

Champions
- Male individual champion: (South Africa) Alan Hatherly (XCO) (France) Loïc Bruni (DH)
- Female individual champion: (Switzerland) Alessandra Keller (XCO) (Austria) Valentina Höll (DH)

The 2024 UCI Mountain Bike World Cup is a series of races in Olympic Cross-Country (XCO), Cross-Country Eliminator (XCE), and Downhill (DHI). Each discipline has an Elite Men and an Elite Women category. There are also under-23 categories in the XCO and junior categories in the DHI. The series has eight rounds both cross-country and downhill, some of which are held concurrently. In 2023, enduro was added to the UCI World Cup series.

== Cross-country ==
=== Elite ===
Date	Venue	Podium (Men)	Podium (Women)
14 April	(Brazil) Mairiporã	Christopher Blevins (USA)	Jenny Rissveds (SWE)
14 April	(Brazil) Mairiporã	Victor Koretzky (FRA)	Savilia Blunk (USA)
14 April	(Brazil) Mairiporã	Filippo Colombo (SUI)	Haley Batten (USA)
21 April	(Brazil) Araxá	Simon Andreassen (DEN)	Haley Batten (USA)
21 April	(Brazil) Araxá	Victor Koretzky (FRA)	Jenny Rissveds (SWE)
21 April	(Brazil) Araxá	Alan Hatherly (RSA)	Savilia Blunk (USA)
26 May	(Czech Republic) Nové Město na Moravě	Tom Pidcock (GBR)	Pauline Ferrand-Prévot (FRA)
26 May	(Czech Republic) Nové Město na Moravě	Nino Schurter (SUI)	Haley Batten (USA)
26 May	(Czech Republic) Nové Město na Moravě	Marcel Guerrini (SUI)	Alessandra Keller (SUI)
16 June	(Italy) Val di Sole	Nino Schurter (SUI)	Pauline Ferrand-Prévot (FRA)
16 June	(Italy) Val di Sole	Alan Hatherly (RSA)	Puck Pieterse (NED)
16 June	(Italy) Val di Sole	Mathis Azzaro (FRA)	Candice Lill (RSA)
23 June	(Switzerland) Crans-Montana	Tom Pidcock (GBR)	Loana Lecomte (FRA)
23 June	(Switzerland) Crans-Montana	Mathias Flückiger (SUI)	Alessandra Keller (SUI)
23 June	(Switzerland) Crans-Montana	Luca Braidot (ITA)	Puck Pieterse (NED)
7 July	(France) Les Gets	Alan Hatherly (RSA)	Puck Pieterse (NED)
7 July	(France) Les Gets	Mathias Flückiger (SUI)	Candice Lill (RSA)
7 July	(France) Les Gets	Simon Andreassen (DEN)	Alessandra Keller (SUI)
29 September	(United States) Lake Placid	Victor Koretzky (FRA)	Laura Stigger (AUT)
29 September	(United States) Lake Placid	Alan Hatherly (RSA)	Sina Frei (SUI)
29 September	(United States) Lake Placid	Filippo Colombo (SUI)	Loana Lecomte (FRA)
6 October	(Canada) Mont-Sainte-Anne	Alan Hatherly (RSA)	Loana Lecomte (FRA)
6 October	(Canada) Mont-Sainte-Anne	Mathis Azzaro (FRA)	Laura Stigger (AUT)
6 October	(Canada) Mont-Sainte-Anne	Victor Koretzky (FRA)	Sina Frei (SUI)

=== Under 23 ===
Date	Venue	Podium (Men)	Podium (Women)
13–14 April	(Brazil) Mairiporã	Riley Amos (USA)	Kira Böhm (GER)
13–14 April	(Brazil) Mairiporã	Bjorn Riley (USA)	Ginia Caluori (SUI)
13–14 April	(Brazil) Mairiporã	Finn Treudler (SUI)	Emilly Johnston (CAN)
20–21 April	(Brazil) Araxá	Riley Amos (USA)	Kira Böhm (GER)
20–21 April	(Brazil) Araxá	Finn Treudler (SUI)	Emilly Johnston (CAN)
20–21 April	(Brazil) Araxá	Alex Malacarne (BRA)	Valentina Corvi (ITA)
25 May	(Czech Republic) Nové Město na Moravě	Riley Amos (USA)	Isabella Holmgren (CAN)
25 May	(Czech Republic) Nové Město na Moravě	Luca Martin (FRA)	Madigan Munro (USA)
25 May	(Czech Republic) Nové Město na Moravě	Bjorn Riley (USA)	Olivia Onesti (FRA)
16 June	(Italy) Val di Sole	Riley Amos (USA)	Isabella Holmgren (CAN)
16 June	(Italy) Val di Sole	Bjorn Riley (USA)	Olivia Onesti (FRA)
16 June	(Italy) Val di Sole	Finn Treudler (SUI)	Elina Benoit (SUI)
22–23 June	(Switzerland) Crans-Montana	Riley Amos (USA)	Olivia Onesti (FRA)
22–23 June	(Switzerland) Crans-Montana	Bjorn Riley (USA)	Madigan Munro (USA)
22–23 June	(Switzerland) Crans-Montana	Luca Martin (FRA)	Emilly Johnston (CAN)
7 July	(France) Les Gets	Bjorn Riley (USA)	Isabella Holmgren (CAN)
7 July	(France) Les Gets	Luca Martin (FRA)	Olivia Onesti (FRA)
7 July	(France) Les Gets	Finn Treudler (SUI)	Kira Böhm (GER)
28 September	(United States) Lake Placid	Cole Punchard (CAN)	Isabella Holmgren (CAN)
28 September	(United States) Lake Placid	Dario Lillo (SUI)	Kira Böhm (GER)
28 September	(United States) Lake Placid	Alex Malacarne (BRA)	Ginia Caluori (SUI)
6 October	(Canada) Mont-Sainte-Anne	Luca Martin (FRA)	Kira Böhm (GER)
6 October	(Canada) Mont-Sainte-Anne	Dario Lillo (SUI)	Olivia Onesti (FRA)
6 October	(Canada) Mont-Sainte-Anne	Yannis Musy (FRA)	Fiona Schibler (SUI)

== Cross-country short track ==
Date	Venue	Podium (Men)	Podium (Women)
13 April	(Brazil) Mairiporã	Sam Gaze (NZL)	Evie Richards (GBR)
13 April	(Brazil) Mairiporã	Luca Schwarzbauer (GER)	Rebecca Henderson (AUS)
13 April	(Brazil) Mairiporã	Martín Vidaurre (CHL)	Alessandra Keller (SUI)
20 April	(Brazil) Araxá	Victor Koretzky (FRA)	Haley Batten (USA)
20 April	(Brazil) Araxá	Christopher Blevins (USA)	Linda Indergand (SUI)
20 April	(Brazil) Araxá	Alan Hatherly (RSA)	Savilia Blunk (USA)
25 May	(Czech Republic) Nové Město na Moravě	Victor Koretzky (FRA)	Alessandra Keller (SUI)
25 May	(Czech Republic) Nové Město na Moravě	Christopher Blevins (USA)	Pauline Ferrand-Prévot (FRA)
25 May	(Czech Republic) Nové Město na Moravě	Thomas Litscher (SUI)	Haley Batten (USA)
14 June	(Italy) Val di Sole	Sam Gaze (NZL)	Puck Pieterse (NED)
14 June	(Italy) Val di Sole	Victor Koretzky (FRA)	Pauline Ferrand-Prévot (FRA)
14 June	(Italy) Val di Sole	Jens Schuermans (BEL)	Savilia Blunk (USA)
22 June	(Switzerland) Crans-Montana	Tom Pidcock (GBR)	Puck Pieterse (NED)
22 June	(Switzerland) Crans-Montana	Julian Schelb (GER)	Alessandra Keller (SUI)
22 June	(Switzerland) Crans-Montana	Luca Braidot (ITA)	Anne Tauber (NED)
5 July	(France) Les Gets	Alan Hatherly (RSA)	Alessandra Keller (SUI)
5 July	(France) Les Gets	Charlie Aldridge (GBR)	Puck Pieterse (NED)
5 July	(France) Les Gets	Sam Gaze (NZL)	Rebecca Henderson (AUS)
28 September	(United States) Lake Placid	Victor Koretzky (FRA)	Sina Frei (SUI)
28 September	(United States) Lake Placid	Simon Andreassen (DEN)	Jenny Rissveds (SWE)
28 September	(United States) Lake Placid	Alan Hatherly (RSA)	Evie Richards (GBR)
4 October	(Canada) Mont-Sainte-Anne	Victor Koretzky (FRA)	Sina Frei (SUI)
4 October	(Canada) Mont-Sainte-Anne	Mathis Azzaro (FRA)	Loana Lecomte (FRA)
4 October	(Canada) Mont-Sainte-Anne	Alan Hatherly (RSA)	Evie Richards (GBR)

== Downhill ==
=== Elite ===
Date	Venue	Podium (Men)	Podium (Women)
5 May	(United Kingdom) Fort William	Loïc Bruni (FRA)	Valentina Höll (AUT)
5 May	(United Kingdom) Fort William	Troy Brosnan (AUS)	Nina Hoffmann (GER)
5 May	(United Kingdom) Fort William	Finn Iles (CAN)	Tahnée Seagrave (GBR)
19 May	(Poland) Bielsko-Biała	Ronan Dunne (IRE)	Marine Cabirou (FRA)
19 May	(Poland) Bielsko-Biała	Loïc Bruni (FRA)	Camille Balanche (SUI)
19 May	(Poland) Bielsko-Biała	Loris Vergier (FRA)	Nina Hoffmann (GER)
9 June	(Austria) Saalfelden–Leogang	Loïc Bruni (FRA)	Valentina Höll (AUT)
9 June	(Austria) Saalfelden–Leogang	Finn Iles (CAN)	Anna Newkirk (USA)
9 June	(Austria) Saalfelden–Leogang	Lachlan Stevens-McNab (NZL)	Myriam Nicole (FRA)
15 June	(Italy) Val di Sole	Amaury Pierron (FRA)	Tahnée Seagrave (GBR)
15 June	(Italy) Val di Sole	Dakotah Norton (USA)	Marine Cabirou (FRA)
15 June	(Italy) Val di Sole	Finn Iles (CAN)	Monika Hrastnik (SLO)
6 July	(France) Les Gets	Amaury Pierron (FRA)	Eleonora Farina (ITA)
6 July	(France) Les Gets	Andreas Kolb (AUT)	Mille Johnset (NOR)
6 July	(France) Les Gets	Greg Minnaar (RSA)	Tahnée Seagrave (GBR)
8 September	(France) Loudenvielle–Peyragudes	Benoît Coulanges (FRA)	Myriam Nicole (FRA)
8 September	(France) Loudenvielle–Peyragudes	Reece Wilson (GBR)	Valentina Höll (AUT)
8 September	(France) Loudenvielle–Peyragudes	Andreas Kolb (AUT)	Phoebe Gale (GBR)
5 October	(Canada) Mont-Sainte-Anne	Troy Brosnan (AUS)	Marine Cabirou (FRA)
5 October	(Canada) Mont-Sainte-Anne	Lachlan Stevens-McNab (NZL)	Gracey Hemstreet (CAN)
5 October	(Canada) Mont-Sainte-Anne	Laurie Greenland (GBR)	Valentina Höll (AUT)

=== Junior ===
Date	Venue	Podium (Men)	Podium (Women)
5 May	(United Kingdom) Fort William	Asa Vermette (USA)	Heather Wilson (GBR)
5 May	(United Kingdom) Fort William	Luke Wayman (NZL)	Sacha Earnest (NZL)
5 May	(United Kingdom) Fort William	Daniel Parfitt (GBR)	Ellie Hulsebosch (NZL)
19 May	(Poland) Bielsko-Biała	Asa Vermette (USA)	Heather Wilson (GBR)
19 May	(Poland) Bielsko-Biała	Mylann Falquet (FRA)	Erice van Leuven (NZL)
19 May	(Poland) Bielsko-Biała	Dane Jewett (CAN)	Sacha Earnest (NZL)
9 June	(Austria) Saalfelden–Leogang	Max Alran (FRA)	Erice van Leuven (NZL)
9 June	(Austria) Saalfelden–Leogang	Dane Jewett (CAN)	Ellie Hulsebosch (NZL)
9 June	(Austria) Saalfelden–Leogang	Mike Huter (SUI)	Heather Wilson (GBR)
15 June	(Italy) Val di Sole	Max Alran (FRA)	Ellie Hulsebosch (NZL)
15 June	(Italy) Val di Sole	Asa Vermette (USA)	Sacha Earnest (NZL)
15 June	(Italy) Val di Sole	Mylann Falquet (FRA)	Erice van Leuven (NZL)
6 July	(France) Les Gets	Asa Vermette (USA)	Heather Wilson (GBR)
6 July	(France) Les Gets	Max Alran (FRA)	Ella Svegby (SWE)
6 July	(France) Les Gets	Jon Mozell (CAN)	Ellie Hulsebosch (NZL)
8 September	(France) Loudenvielle–Peyragudes	Max Alran (FRA)	Erice van Leuven (NZL)
8 September	(France) Loudenvielle–Peyragudes	Tyler Waite (NZL)	Heather Wilson (GBR)
8 September	(France) Loudenvielle–Peyragudes	Luke Wayman (NZL)	Sacha Earnest (NZL)
5 October	(Canada) Mont-Sainte-Anne	Max Alran (FRA)	Erice van Leuven (NZL)
5 October	(Canada) Mont-Sainte-Anne	Till Alran (FRA)	Sacha Earnest (NZL)
5 October	(Canada) Mont-Sainte-Anne	Tyler Waite (NZL)	Kale Cushman (USA)

== Cross-country eliminator ==
Date	Venue	Podium (Men)	Podium (Women)
20 April	(France) Paris	Ede-Károly Molnár (ROM)	Marion Fromberger (GER)
20 April	(France) Paris	Edvin Lindh (SWE)	Gaia Tormena (ITA)
20 April	(France) Paris	Jakob Klemenčič (SLO)	Margaux Borrelly (FRA)
26 April	(Spain) Barcelona	Lorenzo Serres (FRA)	Gaia Tormena (ITA)
26 April	(Spain) Barcelona	Nils-Obed Riecker (GER)	Annemoon van Dienst (NED)
26 April	(Spain) Barcelona	Titouan Perrin-Ganier (FRA)	Marta Cano (ESP)
19 May	(Indonesia) Palangkaraya	Lochlan Brown (NZL)	Didi de Vries (NED)
19 May	(Indonesia) Palangkaraya	Riyadh Hakim (SGP)	Madison Boissière (FRA)
19 May	(Indonesia) Palangkaraya	Theo Hauser (AUT)	Vipavee Deekaballes (THA)
26 May	(Turkey) Sakarya	Edvin Lindh (SWE)	Gaia Tormena (ITA)
26 May	(Turkey) Sakarya	Theo Hauser (AUT)	Didi de Vries (NED)
26 May	(Turkey) Sakarya	Jakob Klemenčič (SLO)	Line Mygdam (DEN)
2 June	(Belgium) Leuven	Theo Hauser (AUT)	Gaia Tormena (ITA)
2 June	(Belgium) Leuven	Edvin Lindh (SWE)	Coline Clauzure (FRA)
2 June	(Belgium) Leuven	Lorenzo Serres (FRA)	Line Mygdam (DEN)
18 August	(Brazil) São Paulo	Edvin Lindh (SWE)	Marion Fromberger (GER)
18 August	(Brazil) São Paulo	Luiz Cocuzzi (BRA)	Iara Caetano (BRA)
18 August	(Brazil) São Paulo	Ede-Károly Molnár (ROM)	Didi de Vries (NED)

== E-MTB cross-country ==
Date	Venue	Podium (Men)	Podium (Women)
1 June	(Italy) Arco di Trento	Jérôme Gilloux (FRA)	Sofia Wiedenroth (GER)
1 June	(Italy) Arco di Trento	Joris Ryf (SUI)	Anna Spielmann (AUT)
1 June	(Italy) Arco di Trento	Mirko Tabacchi (ITA)	Nathalie Schneitter (SUI)
2 June	(Italy) Arco di Trento	Jérôme Gilloux (FRA)	Nathalie Schneitter (SUI)
2 June	(Italy) Arco di Trento	Mirko Tabacchi (ITA)	Anna Spielmann (AUT)
2 June	(Italy) Arco di Trento	Joris Ryf (SUI)	Sofia Wiedenroth (GER)
7 September	(Germany) Bielstein	Joris Ryf (SUI)	Anna Spielmann (AUT)
7 September	(Germany) Bielstein	Jérôme Gilloux (FRA)	Jacqueline Mariacher (AUT)
7 September	(Germany) Bielstein	Jeroen van Eck (NED)	Solène Bouissou (FRA)
8 September	(Germany) Bielstein	Jérôme Gilloux (FRA)	Anna Spielmann (AUT)
8 September	(Germany) Bielstein	Joris Ryf (SUI)	Jacqueline Mariacher (AUT)
8 September	(Germany) Bielstein	Mirko Tabacchi (ITA)	Solène Bouissou (FRA)
11 September	(Belgium) Spa-Francorchamps	Jérôme Gilloux (FRA)	Sofia Wiedenroth (GER)
11 September	(Belgium) Spa-Francorchamps	Mirko Tabacchi (ITA)	Anna Spielmann (AUT)
11 September	(Belgium) Spa-Francorchamps	Joris Ryf (SUI)	Solène Bouissou (FRA)
12 September	(Belgium) Spa-Francorchamps	Joris Ryf (SUI)	Sofia Wiedenroth (GER)
12 September	(Belgium) Spa-Francorchamps	Jérôme Gilloux (FRA)	Anna Spielmann (AUT)
12 September	(Belgium) Spa-Francorchamps	Lukas Dennda (SUI)	Solène Bouissou (FRA)
5 October	Monaco–Alpes-Maritimes	Jérôme Gilloux (FRA)	Sofia Wiedenroth (GER)
5 October	Monaco–Alpes-Maritimes	Mirko Tabacchi (ITA)	Anna Spielmann (AUT)
5 October	Monaco–Alpes-Maritimes	Joris Ryf (SUI)	Solène Bouissou (FRA)
6 October	Monaco–Alpes-Maritimes	Jérôme Gilloux (FRA)	Sofia Wiedenroth (GER)
6 October	Monaco–Alpes-Maritimes	Mirko Tabacchi (ITA)	Solène Bouissou (FRA)
6 October	Monaco–Alpes-Maritimes	Adrián Alonso (ESP)	Anna Spielmann (AUT)

== Enduro ==
In enduro races, the downhills are timed and the uphills are mandatory but not timed.

=== EDR ===
Date	Venue	Podium (Men)	Podium (Women)
11 May	(Italy) Finale Outdoor Region	Richard Rude Jr. (USA)	Harriet Harnden (GBR)
11 May	(Italy) Finale Outdoor Region	Charles Murray (NZL)	Isabeau Courdurier (FRA)
11 May	(Italy) Finale Outdoor Region	Martin Maes (BEL)	Ella Conolly (GBR)
17 May	(Poland) Bielsko-Biała	Charles Murray (NZL)	Isabeau Courdurier (FRA)
17 May	(Poland) Bielsko-Biała	Sławomir Łukasik (POL)	Harriet Harnden (GBR)
17 May	(Poland) Bielsko-Biała	Richard Rude Jr. (USA)	Chloe Taylor (GBR)
7 June	(Austria) Saalfelden–Leogang	Richard Rude Jr. (USA)	Isabeau Courdurier (FRA)
7 June	(Austria) Saalfelden–Leogang	Alex Rudeau (FRA)	Harriet Harnden (GBR)
7 June	(Austria) Saalfelden–Leogang	Sławomir Łukasik (POL)	Morgane Charre (FRA)
28 June	(France) Combloux	Richard Rude Jr. (USA)	Morgane Charre (FRA)
28 June	(France) Combloux	Luke Meier-Smith (AUS)	Isabeau Courdurier (FRA)
28 June	(France) Combloux	Alex Rudeau (FRA)	Ella Conolly (GBR)
13 July	(Switzerland) Aletsch Arena	Jack Moir (AUS)	Harriet Harnden (GBR)
13 July	(Switzerland) Aletsch Arena	Sławomir Łukasik (POL)	Ella Conolly (GBR)
13 July	(Switzerland) Aletsch Arena	Richard Rude Jr. (USA)	Isabeau Courdurier (FRA)
6 September	(France) Loudenvielle–Peyragudes	Martin Maes (BEL)	Morgane Charre (FRA)
6 September	(France) Loudenvielle–Peyragudes	Richard Rude Jr. (USA)	Mélanie Pugin (FRA)
6 September	(France) Loudenvielle–Peyragudes	Gregory Callaghan (IRL)	Ella Conolly (GBR)

=== E-EDR ===
UCI Mountain Bike E-Enduro World Cup races have been held since June 2023.

Date	Venue	Podium (Men)	Podium (Women)
12 May	(Italy) Finale Outdoor Region	Ryan Gilchrist (AUS)	Florencia Espiñeira (CHL)
12 May	(Italy) Finale Outdoor Region	José Borges (POR)	Tracy Moseley (GBR)
12 May	(Italy) Finale Outdoor Region	Cecce Camoin (FRA)	Laura Charles (FRA)
18 May	(Poland) Bielsko-Biała	Sławomir Łukasik (POL)	Florencia Espiñeira (CHL)
18 May	(Poland) Bielsko-Biała	José Borges (POR)	Tracy Moseley (GBR)
18 May	(Poland) Bielsko-Biała	Ryan Gilchrist (AUS)	Laura Charles (FRA)
8 June	(Austria) Saalfelden–Leogang	Martin Maes (BEL)	Florencia Espiñeira (CHL)
8 June	(Austria) Saalfelden–Leogang	Lévy Batista (FRA)	Laura Charles (FRA)
8 June	(Austria) Saalfelden–Leogang	Kévin Miquel (FRA)	Sofia Wiedenroth (GER)
30 June	(France) Combloux	Antoine Rogge (FRA)	Estelle Charles (FRA)
30 June	(France) Combloux	Damien Oton (FRA)	Florencia Espiñeira (CHL)
30 June	(France) Combloux	Ryan Gilchrist (AUS)	George Swift (NZL)
14 July	(Switzerland) Aletsch Arena	Ryan Gilchrist (AUS)	Florencia Espiñeira (CHL)
14 July	(Switzerland) Aletsch Arena	Kévin Marry (FRA)	Raphaela Richter (GER)
14 July	(Switzerland) Aletsch Arena	José Borges (POR)	Alia Marcellini (ITA)
7 September	(France) Loudenvielle–Peyragudes	Hugo Pigeon (FRA)	Estelle Charles (FRA)
7 September	(France) Loudenvielle–Peyragudes	Mathieu Ruffray (FRA)	Florencia Espiñeira (CHL)
7 September	(France) Loudenvielle–Peyragudes	Kévin Marry (FRA)	Tracy Moseley (GBR)

== Marathon ==
Date	Venue	Podium (Men)	Podium (Women)
26 May	(Czech Republic) Nové Město na Moravě	Fabian Rabensteiner (ITA)	Vera Looser (NAM)
26 May	(Czech Republic) Nové Město na Moravě	Alex Miller (NAM)	Lejla Njemčević (BIH)
26 May	(Czech Republic) Nové Město na Moravě	Samuele Porro (ITA)	Rosa van Doorn (NED)
29 June	(France) Megève	Héctor Páez (COL)	Lejla Njemčević (BIH)
29 June	(France) Megève	Andreas Seewald (GER)	Hannah Otto (USA)
29 June	(France) Megève	Samuele Porro (ITA)	Vera Looser (NAM)
29 September	(United States) Lake Placid	Simon Schneller (GER)	Vera Looser (NAM)
29 September	(United States) Lake Placid	Martin Stošek (CZE)	Rosa van Doorn (NED)
29 September	(United States) Lake Placid	Fabian Rabensteiner (ITA)	Lejla Njemčević (BIH)

== World Cup standings ==
bold denotes race winners.

=== Cross-country ===
==== Men's ====
**Top 5 men's elite standings**
Rank	Rider	BRA (Brazil)	BRA (Brazil)	CZE (Czech Republic)	ITA (Italy)	SUI (Switzerland)	FRA (France)	USA (United States)	CAN (Canada)	Total Points
1	(South Africa) **Alan Hatherly**	127	210	137	235	89	**330**	250	**300**	**1678**
2	(France) Victor Koretzky	240	**280**	146	123	DNS	DNS	**330**	240	**1359**
3	(Switzerland) Filippo Colombo	191	187	108	178	131	93	197	144	**1229**
4	(Switzerland) Nino Schurter	71	159	235	**290**	187	DNS	94	128	**1164**
5	(Switzerland) Mathias Flückiger	87	64	130	118	200	221	154	60	**1034**

**Top 5 men's under 23 standings**
Rank	Rider	BRA (Brazil)	BRA (Brazil)	CZE (Czech Republic)	ITA (Italy)	SUI (Switzerland)	FRA (France)	USA (United States)	CAN (Canada)	Total Points
1	(United States) **Riley Amos**	**165**	**165**	**165**	**155**	**165**	DNS	94	65	**974**
2	(United States) Bjorn Riley	120	105	98	140	130	**165**	0	72	**830**
3	(France) Luca Martin	94	61	120	93	105	110	100	120	**803**
4	(Switzerland) Dario Lillo	66	68	95	70	90	69	**140**	**165**	**763**
5	(Switzerland) Finn Treudler	98	116	68	99	78	110	75	59	**703**

==== Women's ====
**Top 5 women's elite standings**
Rank	Rider	BRA (Brazil)	BRA (Brazil)	CZE (Czech Republic)	ITA (Italy)	SUI (Switzerland)	FRA (France)	USA (United States)	CAN (Canada)	Total Points
1	(Switzerland) **Alessandra Keller**	180	190	240	133	265	240	135	175	**1558**
2	(Austria) Laura Stigger	57	37	180	158	187	124	**282**	237	**1262**
3	(South Africa) Candice Lill	86	107	166	200	114	200	181	188	**1242**
4	(France) Loana Lecomte	95	24	108	173	**290**	DNS	200	**315**	**1203**
5	(United States) Savilia Blunk	232	210	106	190	DNS	156	167	131	**1192**

**Top 5 women's under 23 standings**
Rank	Rider	BRA (Brazil)	BRA (Brazil)	CZE (Czech Republic)	ITA (Italy)	SUI (Switzerland)	FRA (France)	USA (United States)	CAN (Canada)	Total Points
1	(Germany) **Kira Böhm**	**165**	**165**	72	110	75	110	140	**165**	**1002**
2	(France) Olivia Onesti	78	81	90	120	**145**	120	58	111	**803**
3	(United States) Madigan Munro	105	83	125	84	125	61	92	84	**759**
4	(Canada) Emilly Johnston	99	130	94	80	120	16	71	73	**683**
5	(Canada) Isabella Holmgren	DNS	DNS	**165**	**155**	DNS	**165**	**155**	30	**670**

=== Cross-country short track ===
**Top 5 men's elite standings**
Rank	Rider	BRA (Brazil)	BRA (Brazil)	CZE (Czech Republic)	ITA (Italy)	SUI (Switzerland)	FRA (France)	USA (United States)	CAN (Canada)	Total Points
1	(France) **Victor Koretzky**	150	**250**	**250**	200	DNS	DNS	**250**	**250**	**1350**
2	(South Africa) Alan Hatherly	54	160	130	110	66	**250**	160	160	**1090**
3	(Germany) Luca Schwarzbauer	200	140	150	72	85	150	44	140	**981**
4	(New Zealand) Sam Gaze	**250**	110	100	**250**	34	160	42	30	**976**
5	(Switzerland) Filippo Colombo	85	130	140	140	120	130	130	68	**943**

**Top 5 women's elite standings**
Rank	Rider	BRA (Brazil)	BRA (Brazil)	CZE (Czech Republic)	ITA (Italy)	SUI (Switzerland)	FRA (France)	USA (United States)	CAN (Canada)	Total Points
1	(Switzerland) **Alessandra Keller**	160	150	**250**	140	200	**250**	110	110	**1370**
2	(United Kingdom) Evie Richards	**250**	100	DNS	90	80	150	160	160	**990**
3	(Australia) Rebecca Henderson	200	66	70	120	120	160	100	150	**986**
4	(Switzerland) Sina Frei	130	90	DNS	130	64	70	**250**	**250**	**984**
5	(United States) Savilia Blunk	90	160	62	160	DNS	120	130	120	**842**

=== Downhill ===
==== Men's ====
**Top 5 men's elite standings**
Rank	Rider	GBR (United Kingdom)	POL (Poland)	AUT (Austria)	ITA (Italy)	FRA (France)	FRA (France)	CAN (Canada)	Total Points
1	(France) **Loïc Bruni**	**370**	257	**370**	226	180	210	38	**1651**
2	(Australia) Troy Brosnan	335	106	180	252	194	DNS	**250**	**1317**
3	(France) Amaury Pierron	115	210	141	**375**	**346**	115	DNS	**1302**
4	(Republic of Ireland) Ronan Dunne	122	**345**	138	186	166	170	75	**1202**
5	(Canada) Finn Iles	300	137	210	300	114	59	32	**1152**

**Top 5 men's junior standings**
Rank	Rider	GBR (United Kingdom)	POL (Poland)	AUT (Austria)	ITA (Italy)	FRA (France)	FRA (France)	CAN (Canada)	Total Points
1	(France) **Max Alran**	40	2	**60**	**60**	50	**60**	**60**	**332**
2	(New Zealand) Luke Wayman	50	30	40	35	18	45	28	**246**
3	(United States) Asa Vermette	**60**	**60**	5	50	**60**	4	DNS	**239**
4	(Canada) Dane Jewett	35	45	50	16	40	10	35	**231**
5	(France) Till Alran	14	40	6	10	20	28	50	**168**

==== Women's ====
**Top 5 women's elite standings**
Rank	Rider	GBR (United Kingdom)	POL (Poland)	AUT (Austria)	ITA (Italy)	FRA (France)	FRA (France)	CAN (Canada)	Total Points
1	(Austria) **Valentina Höll**	**370**	190	**400**	215	270	224	180	**1849**
2	(France) Marine Cabirou	140	**350**	157	**290**	99	145	**250**	**1431**
3	(United Kingdom) Tahnée Seagrave	310	240	120	276	275	100	90	**1411**
4	(France) Myriam Nicole	0	15	240	280	260	**280**	70	**1145**
5	(Germany) Nina Hoffmann	310	196	74	100	72	170	50	**972**

**Top 5 women's junior standings**
Rank	Rider	GBR (United Kingdom)	POL (Poland)	AUT (Austria)	ITA (Italy)	FRA (France)	FRA (France)	CAN (Canada)	Total Points
1	(New Zealand) **Erice van Leuven**	35	50	**60**	45	40	**60**	**60**	**350**
2	(United Kingdom) Heather Wilson	**60**	**60**	45	0	**60**	50	15	**290**
3	(New Zealand) Sacha Earnest	50	45	5	50	35	45	50	**280**
4	(New Zealand) Ellie Hulsebosch	45	40	50	**60**	45	30	DNS	**270**
5	(Sweden) Ella Svegby	DNS	DNS	40	40	50	DNS	35	**165**

=== Cross-country eliminator ===
**Top 5 men's elite standings**
Rank	Rider	FRA (France)	ESP (Spain)	INA (Indonesia)	TUR (Turkey)	BEL (Belgium)	BRA (Brazil)	Total Points
1	(Sweden) **Edvin Lindh**	90	30	36	**120**	100	**120**	**496**
2	(France) Lorenzo Serres	45	**120**	63	32	73	70	**403**
3	(Austria) Theo Hauser	21	48	68	85	**110**	44	**376**
4	(Romania) Ede-Károly Molnár	**98**	6	13	70	43	71	**301**
5	(Germany) Nils-Obed Riecker	15	90	10	10	45	DNS	**170**

**Top 5 women's elite standings**
Rank	Rider	FRA (France)	ESP (Spain)	INA (Indonesia)	TUR (Turkey)	BEL (Belgium)	BRA (Brazil)	Total Points
1	(Italy) **Gaia Tormena**	90	**110**	0	**120**	**120**	DNS	**440**
2	(Netherlands) Didi de Vries	19	63	**105**	90	19	75	**371**
3	(France) Madison Boissière	37	45	100	48	38	61	**329**
4	(Germany) Marion Fromberger	**120**	22	0	0	40	**120**	**302**
5	(France) Coline Clauzure	16	46	0	65	82	DNS	**209**

=== E-MTB cross-country ===
**Top 5 men's standings**
Rank	Rider	ITA (Italy)	ITA (Italy)	GER (Germany)	GER (Germany)	BEL (Belgium)	BEL (Belgium)	MON (Monaco)	MON (Monaco)	Total Points
1	(France) **Jérôme Gilloux**	**25**	**25**	20	**25**	**25**	20	**25**	**25**	**190**
2	(Switzerland) Joris Ryf	20	16	**25**	20	16	**25**	16	13	**151**
3	(Italy) Mirko Tabacchi	16	20	DNS	16	20	0	20	20	**112**
4	(Netherlands) Jeroen van Eck	9	7	16	13	13	11	DNS	DNS	**69**
5	(Switzerland) Lukas Dennda	7	9	0	0	11	16	7	10	**60**

**Top 5 women's standings**
Rank	Rider	ITA (Italy)	ITA (Italy)	GER (Germany)	GER (Germany)	BEL (Belgium)	BEL (Belgium)	MON (Monaco)	MON (Monaco)	Total Points
1	(Austria) **Anna Spielmann**	20	20	**25**	**25**	20	20	20	DNS	**150**
2	(Germany) Sofia Wiedenroth	**25**	16	DNS	DNS	**25**	**25**	**25**	**25**	**141**
3	(France) Solène Bouissou	DNS	DNS	16	16	16	16	16	20	**100**
4	(Switzerland) Nathalie Schneitter	16	**25**	DNS	DNS	DNS	DNS	DNS	DNS	**41**
5	(Austria) Jacqueline Mariacher	DNS	DNS	20	20	DNS	DNS	DNS	DNS	**40**

=== Enduro ===
==== EDR ====
**Top 5 EDR men's elite standings**
Rank	Rider	ITA (Italy)	POL (Poland)	AUT (Austria)	FRA (France)	SUI (Switzerland)	FRA (France)	Total Points
1	(United States) **Richard Rude Jr.**	**470**	389	**496**	**482**	389	414	**2640**
2	(Poland) Sławomir Łukasik	299	429	383	339	434	204	**2088**
3	(New Zealand) Charles Murray	397	**474**	288	284	330	258	**2031**
4	(France) Alex Rudeau	160	229	447	394	247	324	**1801**
5	(Belgium) Martin Maes	363	DNS	211	244	287	**467**	**1572**

**Top 5 EDR women's elite standings**
Rank	Rider	ITA (Italy)	POL (Poland)	AUT (Austria)	FRA (France)	SUI (Switzerland)	FRA (France)	Total Points
1	(United Kingdom) **Harriet Harnden**	**462**	429	441	361	**482**	339	**2514**
2	(France) Isabeau Courdurier	412	**481**	**512**	439	394	255	**2493**
3	(France) Morgane Charre	341	271	400	**512**	308	**459**	**2291**
4	(United Kingdom) Ella Conolly	372	309	343	400	429	371	**2224**
5	(France) Mélanie Pugin	263	249	297	318	341	399	**1867**

==== E-EDR ====
**Top 5 E-EDR men's elite standings**
Rank	Rider	ITA (Italy)	POL (Poland)	AUT (Austria)	FRA (France)	SUI (Switzerland)	FRA (France)	Total Points
1	(Australia) **Ryan Gilchrist**	**458**	358	149	343	**452**	190	**1950**
2	(Portugal) José Borges	395	401	262	226	357	165	**1806**
3	(France) Hugo Pigeon	231	290	223	294	165	**448**	**1651**
4	(France) Kévin Marry	243	126	221	222	391	342	**1545**
5	(Italy) Andrea Garibbo	169	159	292	184	230	319	**1353**

**Top 5 E-EDR women's elite standings**
Rank	Rider	ITA (Italy)	POL (Poland)	AUT (Austria)	FRA (France)	SUI (Switzerland)	FRA (France)	Total Points
1	(Chile) **Florencia Espiñeira**	**469**	**484**	**476**	429	**476**	391	**2725**
2	(France) Laura Charles	354	364	401	267	230	258	**1871**
3	(Germany) Sofia Wiedenroth	311	320	358	243	278	224	**1734**
4	(Italy) Alia Marcellini	271	280	326	38	352	DNS	**1271**
5	(United Kingdom) Tracy Moseley	426	421	DNS	DNS	DNS	351	**1198**

=== Marathon ===
**Top 5 men's elite standings**
Rank	Rider	CZE (Czech Republic)	FRA (France)	USA (United States)	Total Points
1	(Italy) **Fabian Rabensteiner**	**250**	140	160	**550**
2	(Colombia) Héctor Páez	80	**250**	100	**430**
3	(Germany) Simon Schneller	85	80	**250**	**415**
4	(Italy) Samuele Porro	160	160	90	**410**
5	(Germany) Andreas Seewald	95	200	110	**405**

**Top 5 women's elite standings**
Rank	Rider	CZE (Czech Republic)	FRA (France)	USA (United States)	Total Points
1	(Namibia) **Vera Looser**	**250**	160	**250**	**660**
2	(Bosnia and Herzegovina) Lejla Njemčević	200	**250**	160	**610**
3	(Switzerland) Janina Wüst	150	150	150	**450**
4	(Netherlands) Rosa van Doorn	160	0	200	**360**
5	(Sweden) Terese Andersson	140	80	120	**340**

== See also ==
- 2024 UCI Cycling World Championships
