= UCI Mountain Bike & Trials World Championships – Team relay =

Annual cross-country team relay event

The cross-country team relay is an event at the annual UCI Mountain Bike & Trials World Championships. It has been held since the 1999 championships.

== Medalists ==
Championships	Gold	Silver	Bronze
1999 Åre	Spain; Roberto Lezaun; Margarita Fullana; Carlos Coloma; José Antonio Hermida	France; Miguel Martinez; Sandra Temporelli; Julien Absalon; Nicolas Filippi	Canada; Roland Green; Alison Sydor; Ryder Hesjedal; Ricky Federau
2000 Sierra Nevada	Spain; Roberto Lezaun; Margarita Fullana; Iñaki Lejarreta; José Antonio Hermida	Switzerland; Christoph Sauser; Florian Vogel; Barbara Blatter; Silvio Bundi	Italy; Marco Bui; Leonardo Zanotti; Mirko Faranisi; Paola Pezzoa
2001 Vail	Canada; Ryder Hesjedal; Roland Green; Adam Coates; Chrissy Redden	Australia; Sid Taberlay; Mary Grigson; Trent Lowe; Cadel Evans	Spain; José Antonio Hermida; Carlos Coloma; Iñaki Lejarreta; Janet Puiggròs
2002 Kaprun	Canada; Ryder Hesjedal; Roland Green; Max Plaxton; Alison Sydor	France; Julien Absalon; Jean Eudes; Laurence Leboucher; Cedric Ravanel	Switzerland; Florian Vogel; Thomas Frischknecht; Lukas Flückinger; Petra Henzi
2003 Lugano	Poland; Marcin Karczyński; Piotr Formicki; Anna Szafraniec; Kryspin Pyrgies	Switzerland; Ralph Näf; Balz Weber; Nino Schurter; Barbara Blatter	Canada; Roland Green; Ricky Federau; Max Plaxton; Chrissy Redden
2004 Les Gets	Canada; Geoff Kabush; Maximiliam Plaxton; Kiara Bisaro; Raphaël Gagné	Switzerland; Ralph Näf; Florian Vogel; Nino Schurter; Barbara Blatter	Poland; Marcin Karczyński; Kryspin Pyrgies; Paweł Szpila; Maja Włoszczowska
2005 Livigno	Spain; Rubén Ruzafa; Oliver Avilés; Rocío Gamonal; José Antonio Hermida	Italy; Marco Bui; Tony Longo; Eva Lechner; Johannes Schweiggl	France; Alexis Vuillermoz; Stéphane Tempier; Séverine Hansen; Cédric Ravanel
2006 Rotorua	Switzerland; Florian Vogel; Martin Fanger; Petra Henzi; Nino Schurter	Italy; Tony Longo; Cristian Cominelli; Eva Lechner; Jader Zoli	Poland; Marcin Karczyński; Adrian Działakiewicz; Maja Włoszczowska; Kryspin Pyrgies
2007 Fort William	Switzerland; Florian Vogel; Thomas Litscher; Petra Henzi; Nino Schurter	Poland; Marcin Karczyński; Piotr Brzózka; Maja Włoszczowska; Dariusz Batek	United States; Georgia Gould; Ethan Gilmour; Samuel Schultz; Adam Craig
2008 Val di Sole	France; Jean-Christophe Péraud; Arnaud Jouffroy; Laurence Leboucher; Alexis Vuillermoz	Switzerland; Florian Vogel; Matthias Rupp; Petra Henzi; Nino Schurter	Italy; Marco Aurelio Fontana; Gerhard Kerschbaumer; Eva Lechner; Cristian Cominelli
2009 Canberra	Italy; Marco Aurelio Fontana; Gerhard Kerschbaumer; Eva Lechner; Cristian Cominelli	Canada; Raphael Gagne; Geoff Kabush; Evan Guthrie; Catharine Pendrel	France; Alexis Vuillermoz; Cédric Ravanel; Hugo Drechou; Cécile Rode Ravanel
2010 Mont Sainte-Anne	Switzerland; Thomas Litscher; Roger Walder; Katrin Leumann; Ralph Naef	Germany; Manuel Fumic; Julian Schelb; Sabine Spitz; Marcel Fleschhut	Czech Republic; Jaroslav Kulhavý; Ondřej Cink; Kateřina Nash; Tomáš Paprstka
2011 Champery	France; Fabien Canal; Victor Koretzky; Julie Bresset; Maxime Marotte	Switzerland; Thomas Litscher; Lars Forster; Nathalie Schneitter; Nino Schurter	Italy; Gerhard Kerschbaumer; Lorenzo Samparisi; Eva Lechner; Marco Aurelio Fontana
2012 Leogang-Saalfelden	Italy; Marco Aurelio Fontana; Beltain Schmid; Eva Lechner; Luca Braidot	France; Jordan Sarrou; Victor Koretzky; Julie Bresset; Maxime Marotte	Germany; Markus Schulte-Luenzum; Martin Frey; Sabine Spitz; Manuel Fumic
2013 Pietermaritzburg	Italy; Marco Aurelio Fontana; Gioele Bertolini; Eva Lechner; Gerhard Kerschbaumer	France; Jordan Sarrou; Raphaël Gay; Julie Bresset; Maxime Marotte	Germany; Markus Schulte-Lünzum; Georg Egger; Hanna Klein; Manuel Fumic
2014 Hafjell-Lillehammer	France; Jordan Sarrou; Hugo Pigeon; Pauline Ferrand-Prévot; Maxime Marotte	Switzerland; Andri Frischknecht; Filippo Colombo; Jolanda Neff; Nino Schurter	Czech Republic; Kryštof Bogar; Jan Rajchart; Kateřina Nash; Jaroslav Kulhavý
2015 Vallnord	France; Victor Koretzky; Jordan Sarrou; Pauline Ferrand-Prévot; Antoine Philipp	Denmark; Simon Andreassen; Niels Rasmussen; Annika Langvad; Sebastian Carstensen	Italy; Marco Aurelio Fontana; Francesco Bonetto; Eva Lechner; Gioele Bertolini
2016 Nové Město	France; Victor Koretzky; Benjamin Le Ny; Pauline Ferrand-Prévot; Jordan Sarrou	Czech Republic; Matěj Prudek; Richard Holec; Kateřina Nash; Jaroslav Kulhavý	Switzerland; Filippo Colombo; Vital Albin; Sina Frei; Lars Forster
2017 Val di Sole	Switzerland; Filippo Colombo; Joel Roth; Sina Frei; Jolanda Neff; Nino Schurter	Denmark; Sebastian Carstensen; Alexander Andersen; Annika Langvad; Malene Degn; Simon Andreassen	France; Jordan Sarrou; Mathis Azzaro; Pauline Ferrand-Prévot; Lena Gerault; Neilo Perrin Ganier
2018 Lenzerheide	Switzerland; Filippo Colombo; Alexandre Balmer; Sina Frei; Jolanda Neff; Nino Schurter	Germany; Leon Kaiser; Elisabeth Brandau; Maximilian Brandl; Ronja Eibl; Manuel Fumic	Denmark; Sebastian Carstensen; Alexander Andersen; Annika Langvad; Malene Degin; Simon Andreassen
2019 Mont-Sainte-Anne	Switzerland; Joel Roth; Janis Baumann; Sina Frei; Jolanda Neff; Nino Schurter	United States; Christopher Blevins; Riley Amos; Haley Batten; Kate Courtney; Keegan Swenson	France; Thibault Daniel; Luca Martin; Pauline Ferrand-Prévot; Loana Lecomte; Jordan Sarrou
2020 Leogang	France; Mathis Azzaro; Luca Martin; Loana Lecomte; Lena Gerault; Olivia Onesti; Jordan Sarrou	Italy; Luca Braidot; Eva Lechner; Filippo Agostinacchio; Nicole Pesse; Marika Tovo; Juri Zanotti	Switzerland; Luke Wiedmann; Thomas Litscher; Sina Frei; Noëlle Buri; Elisa Alvarez; Alexandre Balmer
2021 Val di Sole	France; Mathis Azzaro; Adrien Boichis; Lena Gerault; Tatiana Tournut; Line Burquier; Jordan Sarrou	United States; Christopher Blevins; Brayden Johnson; Savilia Blunk; Ruth Holcomb; Kate Courtney; Riley Amos	Germany; Leon Reinhard Kaiser; Paul Schehl; Sina van Thiel; Nina Benz; Ronja Eibl; Luca Schwarzbauer
2022 Les Gets	Switzerland; Dario Lillo; Khalid Sidahmed; Ramona Forchini; Ronja Blöchlinger; Anina Hutter; Nino Schurter	Italy; Luca Braidot; Marco Betteo; Martina Berta; Valentina Corvi; Giada Specia; Simone Avondetto	United States; Christopher Blevins; Cayden Parker; Madigan Munro; Bailey Cioppa; Haley Batten; Riley Amos
2023 Glasgow	Switzerland; Dario Lillo; Nicolas Halter; Linda Indergand; Ronja Blöchlinger; Anina Hutter; Nino Schurter	France; Adrien Boichis; Julien Hemon; Loana Lecomte; Line Burquier; Anaïs Moulin; Jordan Sarrou	Denmark; Tobias Lillelund; Albert Philipsen; Julie Lillelund; Sofie Pedersen; Caroline Bohé; Sebastian Fini Carstensen
2024 Pal–Arinsal	United States; Brayden Johnson; Nicholas Konecny; Haley Batten; Vida Lopez; Madigan Munro; Christopher Blevins	France; Luca Martin; Nicolas Kalanquin; Loana Lecomte; Olivia Onesti; Anaïs Moulin; Mathis Azzaro	Italy; Luca Braidot; Matteo Siffredi; Martina Berta; Giada Martinoli; Valentina Corvi; Mattia Stenico
2025 Valais	France; Adrien Boichis; Lucas Teste; Loana Lecomte; Olivia Onesti; Lise Revol; Joshua Dubau	Italy; Juri Zanotti; Elian Paccagnella; Martina Berta; Elisa Ferri; Valentina Corvi; Ettore Fabbro	Switzerland; Finn Treudler; Lewin Iten; Ramona Forchini; Fiona Schibler; Anja Grossmann; Nino Schurter

== Medal table by country ==
Rank	Nation	Gold	Silver	Bronze	Total
1	France	8	6	4	18
1	Switzerland	8	6	4	18
3	Italy	3	5	5	13
4	Canada	3	1	2	6
5	Spain	3	0	1	4
6	United States	1	2	2	5
7	Poland	1	1	2	4
8	Germany	0	2	3	5
9	Denmark	0	2	2	4
10	Czech Republic	0	1	2	3
11	Australia	0	1	0	1
Totals (11 entries)		27	27	27	81
