= Megavalanche =

Enduro mountain bike race in the French Alps

Coordinates: 45°5′43″N 6°4′13″E

- Alpe d'Huez and Le Bourg-d'Oisans from Pic Blanc, the start of the Mega Avalanche

Race details
- Region: French Alps and Réunion
- Nickname: Mega
- Discipline: Mountain-biking, downhill
- Type: Two-day, mass-start
- Organiser: UCC
- Race director: George Edwards
- Web site: www.ucc-sportevent.com/en/megavalanche-alpe-dhuez-en

History
- Editions: 29 (as of 2025)
- Most wins: René Wildhaber (SWI)
- Most recent: Hugo Pigeon (FRA)

Megavalanche (nicknamed "Mega") is a enduro mountain bike race held annually at the Alpe d'Huez ski resort in the French Alps since 1995, and annually on the island of Réunion.

The Alps event, being the more widely publicized and famous among downhill cycling enthusiasts, starts on the glaciated summit of Pic Blanc in Huez and descends to the valley bottom at Allemond, for a total of over 2,600 vertical meters (8530 feet) and a 20 km (12 miles) distance.

The mass-start race is known for its fast speeds and winding turns over varying terrain, with hundreds of riders descending the mountain at once. Famously, racers are allowed to progress down the mountain by any reasonable means, and riders often cut corners and walk their bikes for extended periods of time. Many other enduro races have similarly lenient course guidelines. Officials state that injuries are modest, despite the inherent dangers, and that the race is less dangerous than it may seem to outsiders. The course is designed to slow the riders down around tight curves and the width of the glacier at the race's start line allows the riders to spread out.

== History ==
The Megavalanche race was the creation of mountain bike pioneer George Edwards, who was involved in creating some of the first downhill tracks in Europe. The first race, held in 1995, saw 400 riders in attendance. The race has been managed by Edwards since its inception and is organized by his company, UCC. The exact route of the course may change from year to year, depending on terrain and weather conditions, taking riders between 20 minutes to over 1 hour to complete, but on average lasts 35-50 minutes.

The 2007 race saw a significant increase in participants from outside France, likely driven by an increase in press coverage of the event. The 2013 race saw 2000 riders in attendance from over 30 countries.

On November 11, 2018, Edwards issued a statement notifying participants that the 2018 Réunion Mega race was cancelled. He stated UCC race organizers had "taken note of the prefectural orders not to authorize the organization of the event", due to the yellow vests protests taking place across France.

Megavalanche organizers announced in 2018 a series of races entitled the 'European Mass Start Series', including the Megavalanche race and other races dubbed 'Maxiavalanches' (using the same mass-start format), to take place in 2019. The winner of the series' races will receive travel, accommodations and entry fees covered for the Reunion Island Megavalanche race.

== Race format ==
Since 2014, the format of the event follows three main days:

- Practice Day – Lifts and courses are open and free to anyone with a race plate. Riders are encouraged to familiarize themselves with the course.
- Qualifiers – Riders run qualifying races consisting of six heats of about 250 riders. The resulting qualifier times are broken down into starting lines designated by a letter, with 'A' being the front.
- Race Day – The top 35 riders from each Qualifier start the Elite race on Sunday. The following 35 from each qualifier then race in a similarly mass-started event called the 'Megavalanche Challenger' on Saturday. Any riders outside these two categories are grouped into the 'Megavalanche Amateur' which starts after the Elite race on Sunday, and the 'Affinity' group where they can start at any time after the 'Megavalanche Challenger' on Saturday. Riders' times are recorded automatically by transponder chip.

== Results ==
=== Megavalanche Alpe D'Huez ===
Year	First place	Second place	Third place
1995	(France) François Dola	(France) Pascal Yen Pon	(France) Guillaume Pallarès
1996	(France) Fabrice Taillefer	(France) Pascal Yen Pon	(France) François Dola
1997	(France) Fabrice Taillefer	(France) Lilian Sergent	(France) Olivier Guincêtre
1998	(France) Samuel Peridy	(Switzerland) Bruno Tschanz	(France) Olivier Guincêtre
1999	(France) François Dola	(France) Samuel Peridy	(France) Lionel Sequéra
2000	(France) Alexandre Balaud	(France) Olivier Guincêtre	(France) William Balaud
2001	(Switzerland) René Wildhaber	(France) Alexandre Balaud	(France) Karim Amour
2002	(Switzerland) René Wildhaber	(France) Alexandre Balaud	(France) Olivier Giordanengo
2003	(Switzerland) René Wildhaber	(France) William Balaud	(France) Samuel Peridy
2004	(Switzerland) René Wildhaber	(France) William Balaud	(France) Alexandre Balaud
2005	(France) Jérôme Clementz	(France) Rémy Absalon	(France) Franck Parolin
2006	(France) Nicolas Vouilloz	(Switzerland) René Wildhaber	(France) Mickaël Pascal
2007	(Switzerland) René Wildhaber	(Spain) Tomas Misser	(France) Gregory Doucende
2008	(Switzerland) René Wildhaber	(France) Rémy Absalon	(France) Gregory Doucende
2009	(France) Rémy Absalon	(Switzerland) René Wildhaber	(France) Nicolas Vouilloz
2010	(France) Jérôme Clementz	(France) Nicolas Vouilloz	(New Zealand) Sam Blenkinsop
2011	(France) Rémy Absalon	(France) Jérôme Clementz	(Switzerland) René Wildhaber
2012	(France) Rémy Absalon	(France) Nicholaus Lau	(England) Dan Atherton
2013	(France) Jérôme Clementz	(France) Rémy Absalon	(England) Dan Atherton
2014	(France) Pierre Charles Georges	(France) Thibaut Ruffin	(New Zealand) Reon Boe
2015	(France) Rémy Absalon	(France) Thomas Lapeyrie	(France) Yoann Barelli
2016	(France) Rémy Absalon	(France) Damien Oton	(France) François Bailly-Maître
2017	(France) Damien Oton	(France) François Bailly-Maître	(Belgium) Martin Maes
2018	(France) Damien Oton	(Portugal) Jose Borges	(France) Nicolas Quere
2019	(Portugal) Jose Borges	(France) Kilian Bron	(France) Kevin Miquel
2020	Cancelled due to COVID-19 pandemic		
2021	(Switzerland) Stefan Peter	(France) Kilian Bron	(France) Alexis Chenevier
2022	(Switzerland) Stefan Peter	(Scotland) Liam Moynihan	(Belgium) Olivier Bruwiere
2023	(France) Hugo Pigeon	(France) Damien Oton	(Belgium) Olivier Bruwiere
2024	(France) Hugo Pigeon	(France) Damien Oton	(Belgium) Olivier Bruwiere
2025	(France) Hugo Pigeon	(Belgium) Olivier Bruwiere	(France) Alex Rudeau
2026	(France) Hugo Pigeon	(Belgium) Olivier Bruwiere	(France) Maël Feron

=== Megavalanche Réunion ===
Year	First place	Second place	Third place
1995	(France) Nicolas Vouilloz	(France) François Gachet	(Canada) Patrick Boisvilliers
1996	(France) Pascal Yen Pon	(Germany) Christian Lemmerz	(France) Samuel Peridy
1997	(France) David Dijoux	(France) Samuel Peridy	(France) Guillaume Koch
1998	(Canada) Patrick Boisvilliers	(France) Frédéric Nauche	(France) Jacky Séry
1999	(France) Nicolas Filippi	(France) Lionel Sequéra	(France) François Dola
2000	(France) Samuel Peridy	(France) Pascal Yen Pon	(France) Jacky Séry
2001	(England) Steve Peat	(France) Samuel Peridy	(France) Jacky Séry
2002	(France) Cédric Gracia	(Switzerland) René Wildhaber	(France) Alexandre Balaud
2003	(France) Fabien Barel	(Switzerland) René Wildhaber	(France) Alexandre Balaud
2004	(Switzerland) René Wildhaber	(France) Fabien Barel	(France) Olivier Giordanengo
2005	(France) Rémy Absalon	(Switzerland) René Wildhaber	(France) Fabien Barel
2006	(France) Nicolas Vouilloz	(France) Rémy Absalon	(Spain) Tomas Misser
2007	(France) Nicolas Vouilloz	(France) Rémy Absalon	(Switzerland) René Wildhaber
2008	(France) Rémy Absalon	(France) Fabien Barel	(Switzerland) René Wildhaber
2009	(Switzerland) René Wildhaber	(France) François Bailly-Maître	(France) Franck Parolin
2010	(France) Rémy Absalon	(France) Nicolas Vouilloz	(Switzerland) Nino Schurter
2011	(France) Rémy Absalon	(France) Julien Absalon	(Switzerland) René Wildhaber
2012	(France) Nicholaus Lau	(France) Aurélien Giordanengo	(France) Cédric Gracia
2013	(France) François Bailly-Maitre	(France) Jérôme Clementz	(France) Rémy Absalon
2014	(France) Rémy Absalon	(France) Nicolas Quere	(France) Alexis Chenevier
2015	(France) Rémy Absalon	(France) Alexandre Sicard	(France) Théo Galy
2016	(France) Rémy Absalon	(France) Jérôme Clementz	(France) Cédric Gracia
2017	(France) Thomas Lapeyrie	(France) Loris Vergier	(France) Jean Max Laurestant
2018	Cancelled due to Yellow vests protests		
2019	(France) Damien Oton	(France) François Bailly-Maître	(France) Kilian Bron
2020	Cancelled due to COVID-19 pandemic		
2021	(France) Hugo Pigeon	(France) Alexis Chenevier	(Switzerland) Stefan Peter
2022	(Belgium) Olivier Bruwiere	(France) Antoine Vidal	(France) Romain Payet
2023	(France) Hugo Pigeon	(Belgium) Olivier Bruwiere	(France) Léo Abella
2024	(France) Hugo Pigeon	(Belgium) Olivier Bruwiere	(France) Woody Kefford
2025	(France) Hugo Pigeon	(France) Alex Rudeau	(France) Marius Tenet
