= 2018 UCI Mountain Bike World Championships =

- Venue: Lenzerheide, Switzerland; Val di Sole, Italy
- Dates: 5–6 July 2018; 5–9 September 2018
- Events: 5

The 2018 UCI Mountain Bike World Championships was the 29th edition of the UCI Mountain Bike World Championships. It was held from 5 to 9 September 2018 in Lenzerheide, Switzerland. The four-cross competitions were held in Val di Sole, Italy from 5 to 6 July 2018

== Medal summary ==
=== Medal table ===
| Rank | Nation | Gold | Silver | Bronze | Total |
|---|---|---|---|---|---|
| 1 | Switzerland (SUI) | 4 | 1 | 0 | 5 |
| 2 | Great Britain (GBR) | 2 | 2 | 2 | 6 |
| 3 | Austria (AUT) | 2 | 0 | 0 | 2 |
| 4 | United States (USA) | 1 | 2 | 0 | 3 |
| 5 | France (FRA) | 1 | 0 | 2 | 3 |
| 6 | South Africa (RSA) | 1 | 0 | 0 | 1 |
| 7 | Germany (GER) | 0 | 2 | 0 | 2 |
| 8 | Denmark (DEN) | 0 | 1 | 1 | 2 |
| 8 | Italy (ITA) | 0 | 1 | 1 | 2 |
| 10 | Australia (AUS) | 0 | 1 | 0 | 1 |
| 10 | Belgium (BEL) | 0 | 1 | 0 | 1 |
| 10 | Czech Republic (CZE) | 0 | 1 | 0 | 1 |
| 13 | Canada (CAN) | 0 | 0 | 2 | 2 |
| 13 | Netherlands (NED) | 0 | 0 | 2 | 2 |
| 15 | Norway (NOR) | 0 | 0 | 1 | 1 |
| Totals (15 entries) | | 11 | 12 | 11 | 34 |

=== Men's events ===
| Event | Gold | Silver | Bronze |
|---|---|---|---|
| Elite Cross-country | Nino Schurter; Switzerland | Gerhard Kerschbaumer; Italy | Mathieu van der Poel; Netherlands |
| Under-23 Cross-country | Alan Hatherly; South Africa | Christopher Blevins; United States | David Nordemann; Netherlands |
| Junior Cross-country | Alexandre Balmer; Switzerland | Leon Kaiser; Germany | Mathis Azzaro; France |
| Elite Downhill | Loïc Bruni; France | Martin Maes; Belgium | Danny Hart; Great Britain |
| Junior Downhill | Kade Edwards; Great Britain | Kye A'Hern; Australia | Elliot Jamieson; Canada |
| Elite 4X | Quentin Derbier; France | Tomas Slavik; Czech Republic | Mikulas Nevrkla; Czech Republic |

=== Women's events ===
| Event | Gold | Silver | Bronze |
|---|---|---|---|
| Elite Cross-country | Kate Courtney; United States | Annika Langvad; Denmark | Emily Batty; Canada |
| Under-23 Cross-country | Alessandra Keller; Switzerland | Sina Frei; Switzerland | Marika Tovo; Italy |
| Junior Cross-country | Laura Stigger; Austria | Tereza Sásková; Czech Republic | Harriet Harnden; Great Britain |
| Elite Downhill | Rachel Atherton; Great Britain | Tahnée Seagrave; Great Britain | Myriam Nicole; France |
| Junior Downhill | Valentina Höll; Austria | Anna Newkirk; United States | Mille Johnset; Norway |
| Elite 4X | Romana Labounková; Czech Republic | Natasha Bradley; Great Britain | Raphaela Richter; Germany |

=== Team events ===
| Event | Gold | Silver | Bronze |
|---|---|---|---|
| Cross-country | Switzerland; Filippo Colombo; Alexandre Balmer; Sina Frei; Jolanda Neff; Nino Schurter | Germany; Leon Kaiser; Elisabeth Brandau; Maximilian Brandl; Ronja Eibl; Manuel Fumic | Denmark; Sebastian Carstensen; Alexander Andersen; Annika Langvad; Malene Degin; Simon Andreassen |

== See also ==
- 2018 UCI Mountain Bike World Cup
