= Haley Batten =

American cyclist (born 1998)

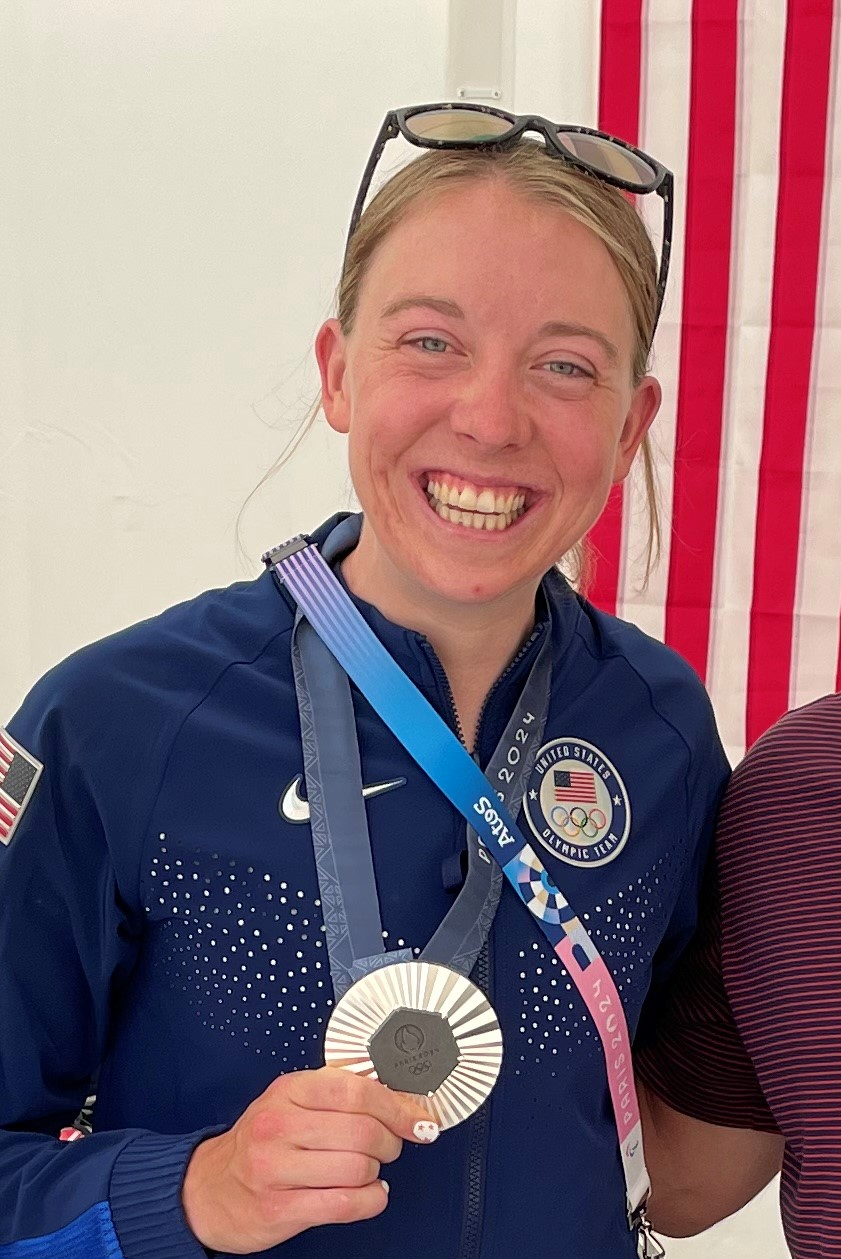
- Batten with her silver medal from the 2024 Summer Olympic Games

Personal information
- Born: September 19, 1998 (age 28) Park City, Utah, U.S.

Cycling career
- Sport: Cycling
- Current team: Specialized Racing
- Discipline: Mountain Bike
- Role: Rider
- Rider type: Cross-Country

Amateur teams
- White Pine Touring
- Whole Athlete Specialized

Professional teams
- 2016–2019: Clif Pro Team
- 2019—2021: Trinity Racing
- 2021–: Specialized Racing

Major wins
- Mountain bike XC World Cup 1 individual win (2024) Cape Epic (2023)
Medal record
Women's mountain bike racing
Representing the United States
Olympic Games
Silver medal – second place	2024 Paris	Cross-country
World Championships
Gold medal – first place	2024 Vallnord	Mixed relay
Bronze medal – third place	2022 Les Gets	Cross-country

Haley Batten (born September 19, 1998) is a professional cross-country mountain biker and Olympic silver medalist. She has represented the United States at the elite level since 2021. Currently on the Specialized Factory Racing team, she rides the S-Works series of mountain bikes.

== Career ==
Batten won national titles as a junior and another at the U23 level. She won a U23 World Cup, and was part of the USA team relay at the 2019 UCI Mountain Bike World Championships where they earned a silver medal in Mont-Sainte-Anne, Canada. Batten rode for the Clif Pro Team from 2016 to 2019, Trinity Racing from 2019 to 2021, and Specialized Factory Racing from 2022 to present. Batten rode to a third-place finish at her first elite World Cup XCO race in Albstadt, Germany. On Friday 14 May 2021 Batten won the short-track cross-country MTB World Cup race in the Czech Republic. She followed this up finishing in 2nd place at the Nové Město XCO World Cup race punching her ticket to the 2020 Tokyo Olympics as the finish met USA Cycling’s automatic criteria for making the team.

During the first World Cups of 2024 in Brazil, Batten won a bronze in Maripora XCO and the following weekend in Araxa she was 1st in the XCC and XCO. These podiums in Brazil put Batten into both XCC and XCO leader jerseys. During the 3rd World Cup in Nove Mesto Na Morave she placed 3rd in the XCC and 2nd in the XCO. She would continue on to the 4th World Cup at Val d' Sole ranked 1st in XCO.

Batten's results in Brazil qualified her for the 2024 Paris Olympics. Competing at the Games, she won the silver medal, the United States' first in mountain biking.

== Major results ==
2015
1st Cross-country, National Junior Championships
2016
2nd Cross-country, National Junior Championships
2017
1st Cross-country, National Under-23 Championships
2018
2nd Cross-country, National Under-23 Championships
2019
UCI Under-23 XCO World Cup

1st Nové Město
3rd Albstadt
3rd Lenzerheide

Pan American Championships

1st Under-23 Cross-country
2nd Team relay

2nd Team relay, UCI World Championships
2020
1st Cross-country, National Under-23 Championships
UCI Under-23 XCO World Cup

3rd Nové Město I

2021
UCI XCO World Cup

2nd Nové Město
3rd Albstadt

UCI XCC World Cup

1st Nove Mesto

9th Cross-country, Olympic Games Tokyo
2022
1st Overall Cape Epic (with Sofía Gómez Villafañe)
UCI World Championships

3rd Cross-country
3rd Team relay

UCI XCO World Cup

3rd Mont-Sainte-Anne

2023
Shimano Super Cup

1st Banyoles

XCO French Cup

2nd Lons-le-Saunier

UCI XCO World Cup

4th Les Gets

2024
UCI XCO World Cup

1st Araxá
2nd Nové Město
3rd Mairiporã

UCI XCC World Cup

1st Araxá
3rd Nové Město

2nd Cross-country, Olympic Games Paris

2025
1st Sea Otter Gravel women's elite
