= Victor Koretzky =

French cyclist (born 1994)

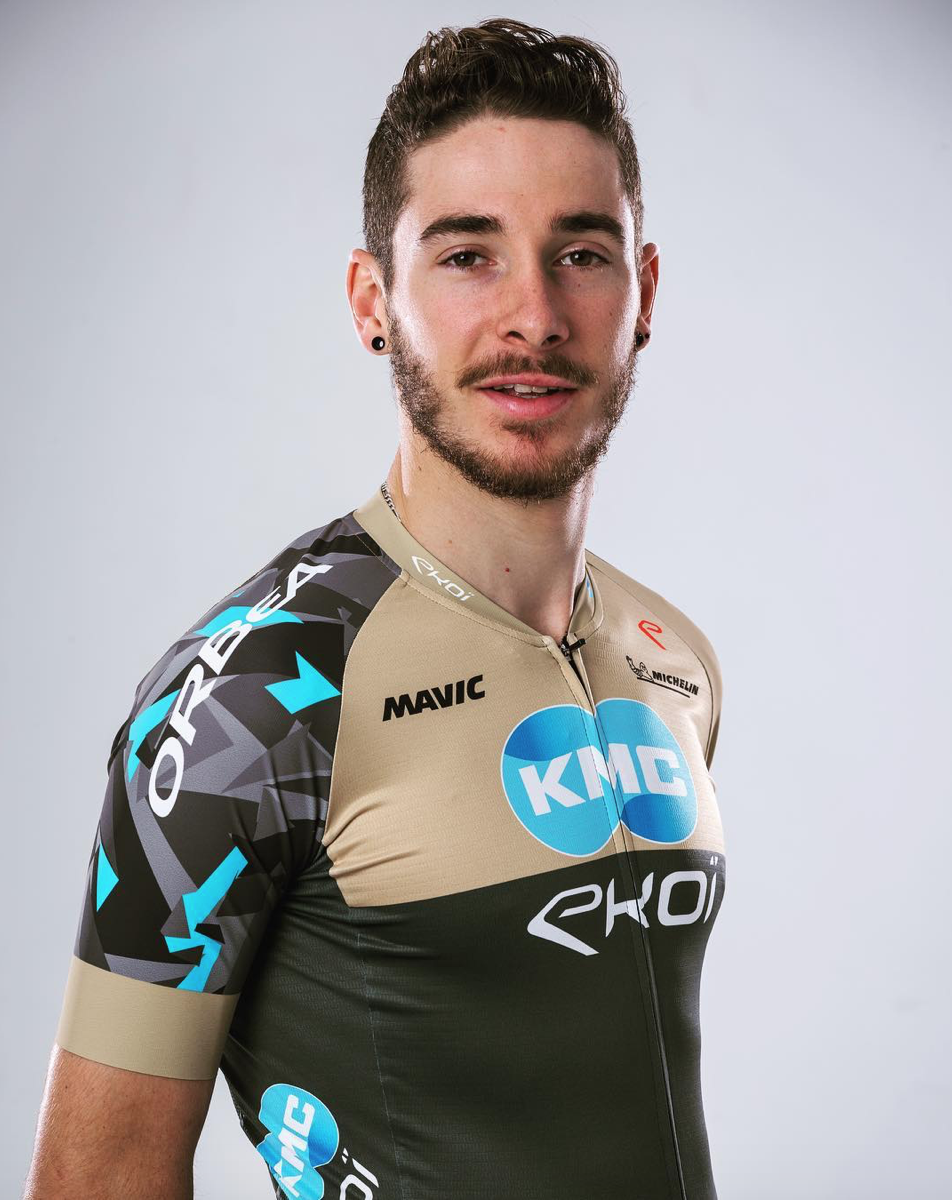
- Portrait of Koretzky in 2019

Personal information
- Full name: Victor Koretzky
- Born: 26 August 1994 (age 32) Béziers, France
- Height: 180 cm (5 ft 11 in)
- Weight: 69 kg (152 lb)

Cycling career
- Sport: Cycling
- Disciplines: Mountain biking; Road; Cyclo-cross
- Role: Rider
- Rider type: Cross-country

Professional teams
- 2018–2021: Team KMC–Ekoi–SR Suntour
- 2022: B&B Hotels–KTM
- 2023: Bora–Hansgrohe

Major wins
- Mountain bike National XC Championships (2019) XC World Cup 5 individual wins (2021, 2023, 2024, 2025)
Medal record
Representing France
Men's mountain bike racing
Olympic Games
Silver medal – second place	2024 Paris	Cross-country
World Championships
Gold medal – first place	2011	Junior cross-country
Gold medal – first place	2011	Cross-country team relay
Gold medal – first place	2015	Cross-country team relay
Gold medal – first place	2016	Cross-country team relay
Gold medal – first place	2024 Vallnord	Cross-country short track
Silver medal – second place	2012	Junior cross-country
Silver medal – second place	2012	Cross-country team relay
Silver medal – second place	2015	Under 23 cross-country
Silver medal – second place	2016	Under 23 cross-country
Silver medal – second place	2024 Vallnord	Cross country
European Championships
Gold medal – first place	2011	Mixed relay
Gold medal – first place	2016	Under-23 cross-country
Silver medal – second place	2016	Mixed relay
French National Championships
Gold medal – first place	2011	Junior cross-country
Gold medal – first place	2016	Under-23 cross-country
Gold medal – first place	2019	Cross-country
Gold medal – first place	2021	Short track cross-country

Victor Koretzky (born 26 August 1994) is a French cross-country mountain biker and road cyclist, who last rode for UCI WorldTeam Bora–Hansgrohe. He won the junior cross-country world championship in 2011. Competing with the French team he won the cross-country team relay world championship in 2011, 2015, and 2016.

== Career and personal life ==
Koretzky represented France in cross-country mountain biking at the 2016 Summer Olympics in Rio de Janeiro, Brazil.

His brother Clément Koretzky is also a cyclist.

== Major results ==
=== Cyclo-cross ===
2011–2012
3rd National Junior Championships
2014–2015
3rd National Under-23 Championships
2015–2016
Coupe de France

1st Flamanville
2nd Quelneuc

2nd National Under-23 Championships
2016–2017
Coupe de France

3rd Bagnoles de l'Orne

=== Mountain bike ===
2011
UCI World Championships

1st Team relay
1st Junior cross-country

2012
UCI World Championships

2nd Team relay
2nd Junior cross-country

2015
UCI World Championships

1st Team relay
2nd Under-23 cross-country

1st Roc d'Azur
2016
UCI World Championships

1st Team relay
2nd Under-23 cross-country

1st Cross-country, National Under-23 Championships
2017
Copa Catalana Internacional

1st Banyoles

2018
Copa Catalana Internacional

1st Banyoles
1st Barcelona

2nd Cross-country, National Championships
2019
1st Cross-country, National Championships
French Cup

2nd Marseille
2nd Levens

Copa Catalana Internacional

2nd Banyoles

2nd Tokyo 2020 Test Event
UCI XCC World Cup

3rd Les Gets

2020
Copa Catalana Internacional

1st Barcelona
2nd Banyoles

UCI XCC World Cup

2nd Nové Město

2021
1st Short track, National Championships
UCI XCO World Cup

1st Albstadt
1st Lenzerheide

UCI XCC World Cup

1st Snowshoe
2nd Albstadt
3rd Lenzerheide

French Cup

1st Lons-le-Saunier
1st Marseille

Copa Catalana Internacional

1st Banyoles
1st Barcelona

Internazionali d’Italia Series

2nd Andora

3rd Cross-country, UCI World Championships
5th Cross-country, Olympic Games
2023
UCI XCO World Cup

1st Les Gets

UCI XCC World Cup

1st Les Gets
1st Snowshoe
1st Mont-Sainte-Anne

UCI World Championships

2nd Short track
4th Cross-country

2024
UCI World Championships

1st Short track
2nd Cross-country
5th Marathon

1st Overall UCI XCC World Cup

1st Araxá
1st Nové Město
1st Lake Placid
1st Mont-Sainte-Anne
2nd Val di Sole

2nd Overall UCI XCO World Cup

1st Lake Placid
2nd Mairiporã
2nd Araxá
3rd Mont-Sainte-Anne

Shimano Super Cup

1st Banyoles

2nd Cross-country, Olympic Games
2025
1st Short track, UCI World Championships
UCI XCO World Cup

1st Araxá I

UCI XCC World Cup

2nd Araxá I
2nd Araxá II

=== Road ===
2022
1st Stage 3 Alpes Isère Tour
