= Ellie Hulsebosch =

New Zealand downhill mountain biker

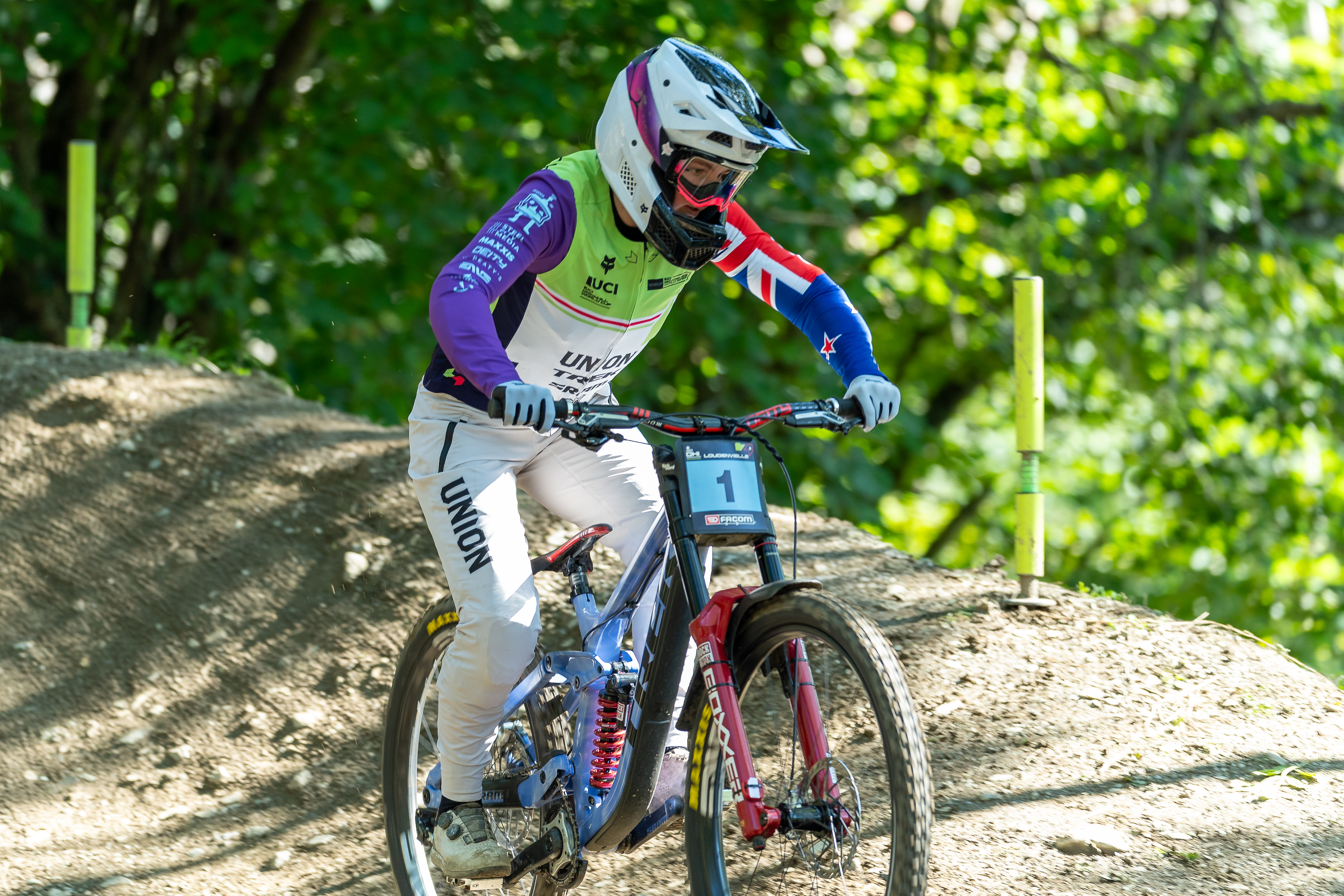
- Loudenvielle 2024

Personal information
- Born: 7 August 2007 (age 19)

Cycling career
- Sport: Cycling
- Discipline: Downhill mountain biking
- Role: Rider
- Rider type: Downhill (DHI)

Professional team
- Santa Cruz Syndicate

Eliana Hulsebosch (born 7 August 2007) is a downhill mountain biker from Aotearoa, New Zealand. 2024 is her first season of competing in the UCI Mountain Bike World Cup and after four races, she has taken first place in the overall standings.

== Personal life ==
Hulsebosch was born on 7 August 2007 and is from Tauranga in New Zealand. She previously attended Aquinas College, but changed to Te Kura (The Correspondence School).

== Cycling ==
Hulsebosch started racing mountain bikes aged 10. She rides cross country, enduro, and downhill, with the latter her favourite for the "adrenaline rush". At the 2023 downhill mountain biking national championships, she broke her back.

At Crankworx in Rotorua in March 2024, she competed in downhill in the elite class and won the event. For 2024, she signed with the British team Union – Forged by Steel City Media for her first UCI Mountain Bike World Cup season. In her first UCI race in Fort William in Scotland on 5 May, she came third. Two weeks later in the Polish Bielsko-Biała, she came fourth. In her third UCI race in the Austrian Saalfelden–Leogang on 9 June, she came second, beaten by fellow New Zealander Erice van Leuven. In her fourth UCI race, held in Val di Sole in Italy on 15 June, she won the competition. With that win, she took the lead in the women junior downhill standing.
