= Riley Amos =

US mountain biker (born 2002)

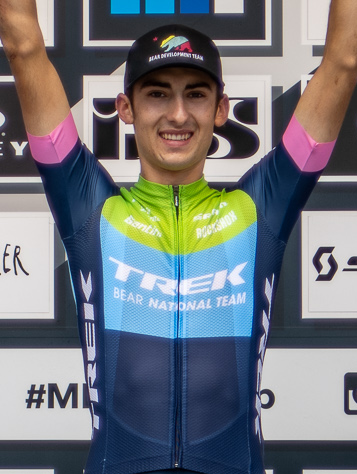
- Amos in 2021

Personal information
- Born: March 2, 2002 (age 24) Durango, Colorado
- Height: 1.82 m (6 ft 0 in)
- Weight: 65 kg (143 lb)

Cycling career
- Sport: Cycling
- Current team: Trek Factory Racing
- Discipline: Cross-country
- Role: Rider

Professional team
- 2022–: Trek Factory Racing
Medal record
Men's mountain bike racing
Representing United States
World Championships
| Gold medal – first place | 2024 Vallnord | U–23 cross-country short track |

Riley Amos (/ˈeɪmoʊs/ AY-mohss; born March 2, 2002) is an American cyclist, who specializes in cross-country mountain biking. He was selected to compete in the cross-country race at the 2024 Summer Olympics.

He won five consecutive races in the 2024 UCI Under-23 Cross-country World Cup, after winning two rounds and finishing second overall the year before.

== Major results ==
2019
2nd Team relay, UCI World Championships
Pan American Championships

2nd Junior cross-country
2nd Team relay

2021
UCI Under-23 XCO World Cup

1st Leogang
2nd Nové Město na Moravě

2nd Team relay, UCI World Championships
2022
3rd Team relay, UCI World Championships
UCI Under-23 XCO World Cup

3rd Vallnord
4th Petrópolis

2023
2nd Overall UCI Under-23 XCO World Cup

1st Pal–Arinsal
1st Mont-Sainte-Anne
2nd Les Gets
3rd Val di Sole
3rd Snowshoe

2nd Cross-country, National Championships
3rd Overall UCI Under-23 XCO World Cup

1st Snowshoe
2nd Nové Město na Moravě
2nd Leogang
2nd Pal–Arinsal
2nd Les Gets
3rd Mont-Sainte-Anne
4th Val di Sole

4th Cross-country, UCI Under-23 World Championships
2024
UCI Under-23 XCO World Cup

1st Mairiporã
1st Araxá
1st Nové Město na Moravě
1st Val di Sole
1st Crans-Montana

UCI Under-23 XCC World Cup

1st Mairiporã
1st Araxá
1st Nové Město na Moravě
1st Crans-Montana
2nd Val di Sole

Pan American Championships

1st Cross-country short track
1st Under-23 cross-country
1st Team relay
