= Savilia Blunk =

American cyclist (born 1999)

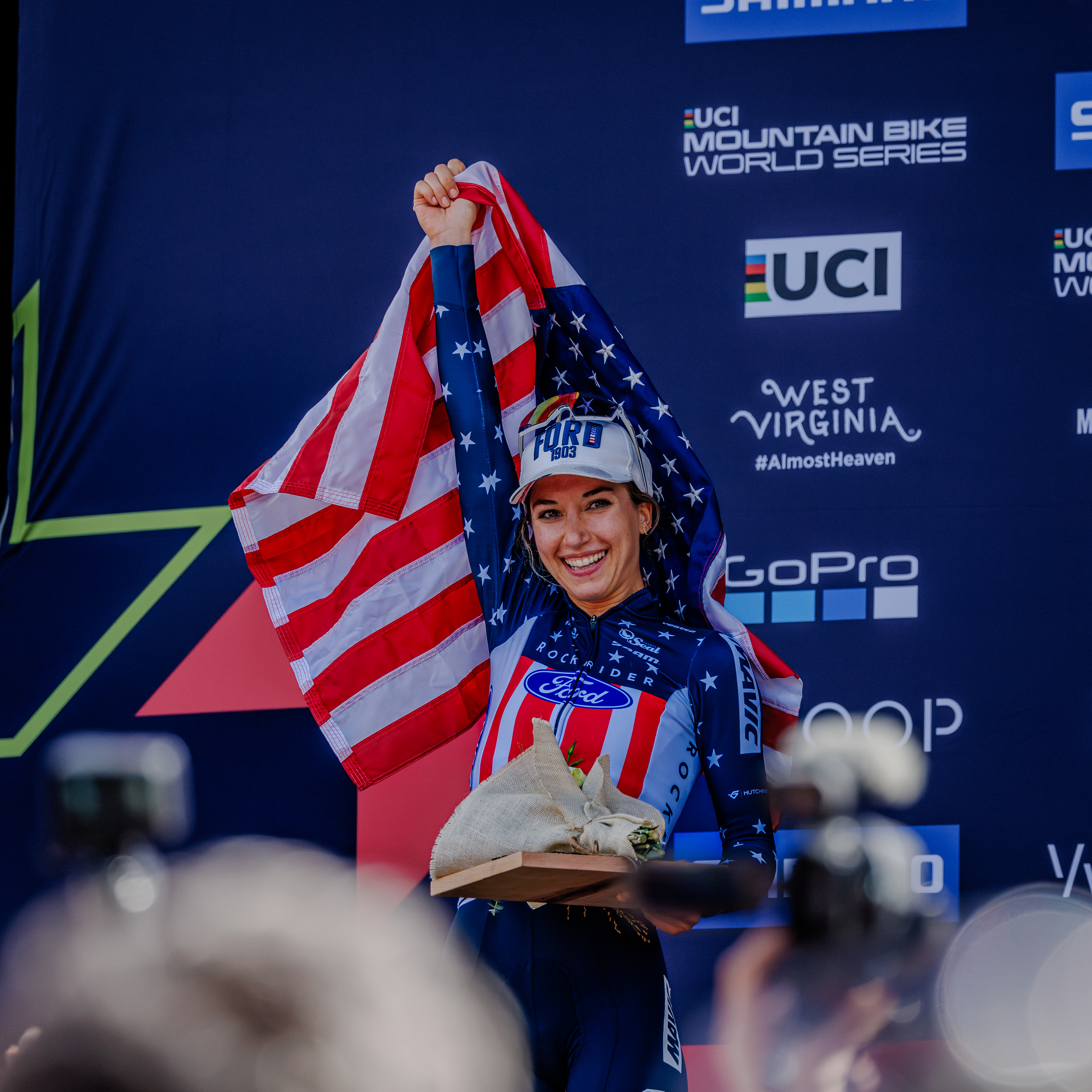
- Blunk in 2023

Personal information
- Born: May 30, 1999 (age 27) Santa Rosa, California

Cycling career
- Sport: Cycling
- Current team: Decathlon Ford Racing Team
- Discipline: Mountain bike
- Role: Rider
- Rider type: Cross-country

Professional teams
- 2020: Liv Racing
- 2021–2023: Rockrider Racing Team
- 2024–: Decathlon Ford Racing Team
Medal record
Women's mountain bike racing
Representing the United States
Silver medal – second place	2021 Val Di Sole	Team relay

Savilia Blunk (/səˈvɪliə ˈblʌŋk/ sə-VIL-ee-ə BLUNK; born May 30, 1999) is an American elite cross-country mountain biker. She raced for Team USA in the 2024 Paris Olympics.

Blunk grew up in Inverness, California, and later competed for Fort Lewis College in Durango, Colorado. She is a two-time national cross-country champion, and also won the cross-country short track title in 2023. She also finished 8th in the cross-country short track race and 10th in the Olympic cross-country race at the 2023 UCI Mountain Bike World Championships. In 2024, she took her first elite UCI World Cup podiums.

== Major results ==
2017
1st Cross-country, National Junior Championships
2018
1st Cross-country, National Under-23 Championships
2021
Pan American Championships

1st Team relay
1st Under-23 cross-country

National Championships

1st Cross-country short track
1st Under-23 cross-country

2nd Team relay, UCI World Championships
UCI Under-23 XCO World Cup

3rd Lenzerheide
3rd Snowshoe

2022
1st Cross-country, National Championships
2023
National Championships

1st Cross-country
1st Cross-country short track

UCI XCO World Cup

4th Snowshoe
5th Les Gets

2024
UCI XCO World Cup

2nd Mairiporã
3rd Araxá

UCI XCC World Cup

3rd Araxá
3rd Val di Sole

2025
UCI XCO World Cup

3rd Araxá
3rd Lenzerheide

2025 UCI Mountain Bike World Championships

5th XCO

National Championships

2nd Cross-country
1st Cross-country short track

2026
UCI XCO World Cup

3rd Lenzerheide
2nd La Thuile, Aosta Valley

UCI XCC World Cup

1st Lenzerheide
3rd La Thuile, Aosta Valley
