= Olivia Onesti =

French cyclist (born 2003)

- Olivia Onesti in 2022

Personal information
- Born: 6 December 2003 (age 22) Fontainebleau, Île-de-France, France

Cycling career
- Sport: Cycling
- Disciplines: Cross-country; Cyclo-cross
- Role: Rider
Medal record
Women's cross-country cycling
Representing France
| Gold medal – first place | 2021 Val di Sole | Team relay |
| Gold medal – first place | 2025 Valais | Mixed cross-country team relay |

Olivia Onesti (born 6 December 2003) is a French cross-country cyclist who won the Coupe de France de cyclo-cross in 2019 and the Cross Country team relay at the 2020 and 2025 UCI Mountain Bike World Championships. She also earned silver medals at the 2021 UCI Mountain Bike World Championships and the Under-23 2024 UCI Mountain Bike World Cup.

== Early life ==
Olivia Onesti was born on 6 December 2003 in Fontainebleau. She first learned to ride a bike at the age of three after being taught by her parents and older brother.

== Career ==
In 2019, at the age of 16, Onesti won the Coupe de France de cyclo-cross, with 128 points. The following year, she won both the Cross Country team relay at the 2020 UCI Mountain Bike World Championships in Leogang, and placed second in the same event at the European Mountain Bike Championships as part of the French team.

Onesti earned a silver medal in the Women's Junior Cross-country at the 2021 UCI Mountain Bike World Championships in Val di Sole, after finishing five seconds after the winner Line Burquier. She also placed twelfth during that year's French National Championship Junior Road Race.

During the Under-23 2024 UCI Mountain Bike World Cup, Onesti placed third and second in the third and fourth rounds before winning the fifth round race in Crans-Montana. She later earned second place both in the sixth and eighth rounds held in Les Gets and Mont-Sainte-Anne. In the standings overall, Onesti was the runner-up.

In 2025, Onesti joined the BH Coloma team, and won the Cross-Country Olympic at the French National Championships. In August, she earned a bronze medal during the seventh round in Les Gets of the Under-23 2025 UCI Mountain Bike World Cup, and overall placed fifth in the competition with 732 points. In September, she won a gold medal with the French team at the 2025 UCI Mountain Bike World Championships, alongside Loana Lecomte, Joshua Dubau, Adrien Boichis, Lise Revol and Lucas Teste, in Crans-Montana.

At the beginning of 2026, Onesti fractured her shoulder and suffered a concussion and was out injured for much of the racing season. In May, she and BH Coloma announced that Onesti was leaving the team "by mutual agreement".
