= 2014 UCI Mountain Bike & Trials World Championships – Team relay =

== Results ==
#	Cycliste		Time
1	France; Jordan Sarrou; Hugo Pigeon; Pauline Ferrand-Prévot; Maxime Marotte	in	52 min 02 s
2	Switzerland; Andri Frischknecht; Filippo Colombo; Jolanda Neff; Nino Schurter		52 min 47 s
3	Czech Republic; Krystof Bogar; Jan Rajchart; Kateřina Nash; Jaroslav Kulhavý		52 min 57 s
4	United States; Todd Wells; Neilson Powless; Lea Davison; Keegan Swenson		53 min 27 s
5	Germany; Julian Schelb; Luca Schwarzbauer; Sabine Spitz; Manuel Fumic		53 min 33 s
6	Australia; Daniel McConnell; Cameron Ivory; Rebecca Henderson; Reece Tucknott		53 min 38 s
7	Canada; Leandre Bouchard; Geoff Kabush; Marc Andre Fortier; Catharine Pendrel		53 min 55 s
8	Netherlands; Rudi van Houts; Joris Nieuwenhuis; Anne Terpstra; Michiel van der Heijden		54 min 15 s
9	Denmark; Sebastian Carstensen Fini; Niels Rasmussen; Annika Langvad; Simon Andreassen		54 min 18 s
10	Spain; José Antonio Hermida; Pablo Rodriguez Guede; Javier Jimenez Pascual; Rocio Martin Rodriguez		54 min 51 s
11	Sweden; Emil Lindgren; Axel Lindh; Kajsa Snihs; Max Wiklund-Hellstadius		55 min 03 s
12	Norway; Sondre Kristiansen; Erik Nordsaeter Resell; Ingrid Boe Jacobsen; Ola Kjören		55 min 06 s
13	Ukraine; Serhiy Rysenko; Oleksiy Zavolokin; Yana Belomoyna; Kostiantyn Prykhodko		55 min 39 s
14	Austria; Alexander Gehbauer; Max Foidl; Felix Ritzinger; Elisabeth Osl		55 min 46 s
15	Belgium; Bart De Vocht; Niels Derveaux; Githa Michiels; Ruben Scheire	en	56 min 00 s
16	Russia; Timofei Ivanov; Anton Stepanov; Anna Konovalova; Arsenty Vavilov		56 min 29 s
17	Italy; Luca Braidot; Moreno Pellizzon; Eva Lechner; Andrea Righettini		56 min 32 s
18	Slovakia; Frantisek Lami; Filip Sklenarik; Janka Keseg Stevkova; Michal Lami		57 min 10 s
19	South Africa; Gert Heyns; Candice Neethling; Alan Hatherly; Philip Buys		57 min 55 s
20	Mexico; Ignacio Torres; José Aurelio Hernandez; Daniela Campuzano; Jose Gerardo Ulloa		57 min 58 s
21	Argentina Agustina Maria Apaza; Gonzalo Artal Lokman; Dario Alejandro Gasco		59 min 08 s
22	Great Britain; Iain Paton; Dylan Kerfoot-Robson; Alice Barnes; Grant Ferguson		1 h 00 min 09 s
23	Portugal; Mario Luis Miranda Costa; Rodrigo Serafin; Joana Filipa Oliveira Monteiro; Goncalo Duarte Amado		1 h 00 min 28 s
24	Japan; Kohei Yamamoto; Toki Sawada; Mio Suemasa; Ari Hirabayashi		1 h 00 min 34 s
25	Israel; Shlomi Haimy; Guy Niv; Guy Leshem; Meghan Beltzer		1 h 00 min 45 s
26	Finland; Toni Tahti; Sasu Halme; Sonja Kallio; Jukka Vastaranta		1 h 03 min 55 s
27	Turkey; Isak Unal; Esra Kurkcu; Yunus Emre Yilmaz; Abdulkadir Kelleci		1 h 05 min 47 s
