= Harriet Harnden =

British cyclist

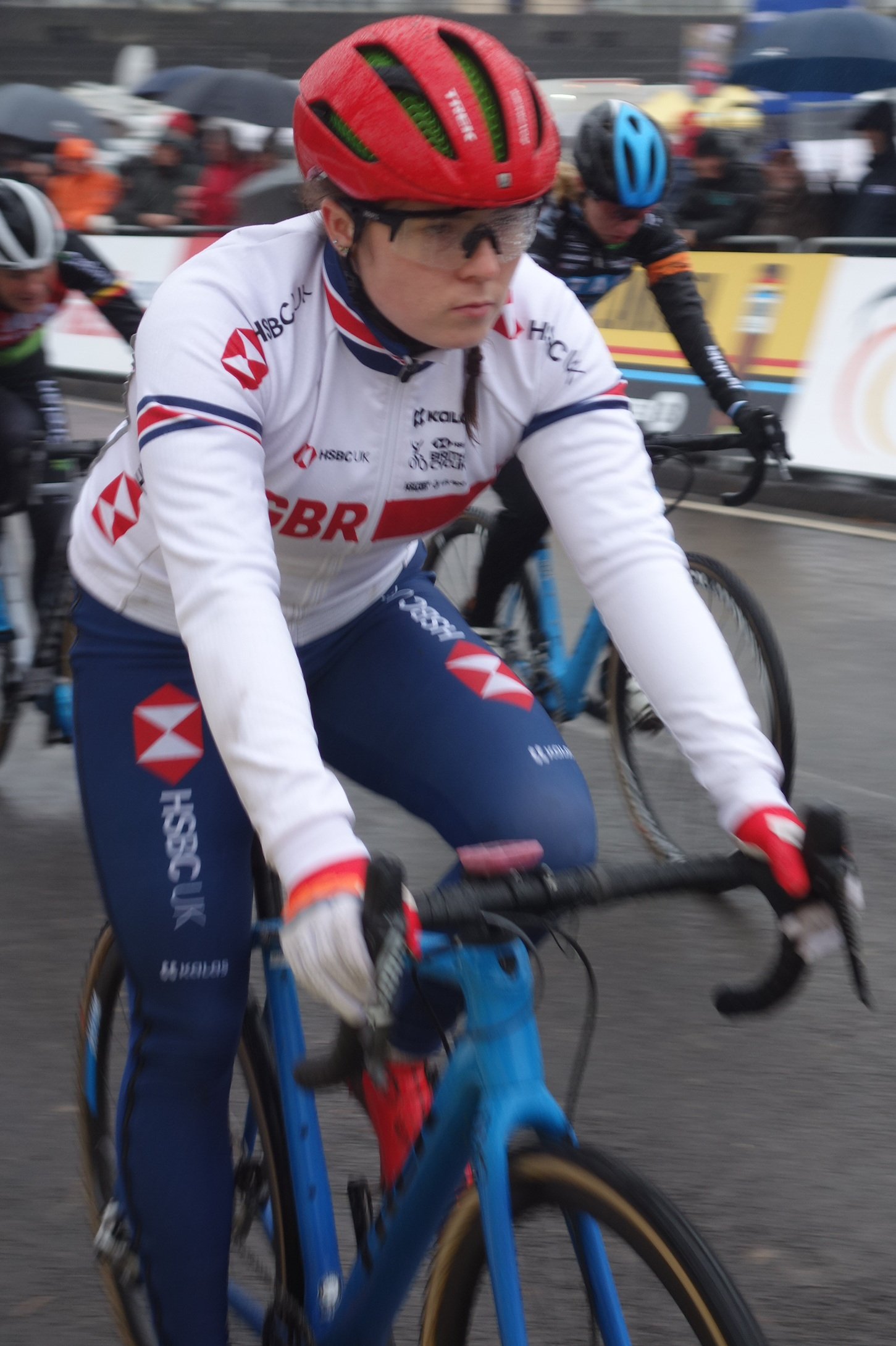
- Harnden in 2019

Personal information
- Nickname: Hattie
- Born: 9 March 2001 (age 25) West Malvern, England

Cycling career
- Sport: Cycling
- Current team: AON Racing–Tourne Campervans
- Disciplines: Cyclo-cross, mountaing biking
- Role: Rider

Professional teams
- 2020–2024: Trek Factory Racing
- 2025–: AON Racing–Tourne Campervans

Major wins
- UCI Mountain Bike World Cup: Enduro overall series winner (2024); National Cyclo-cross Championships (2020, 2022)

Harriet Harnden (born 9 March 2001) is a British cyclist who has competed in cyclo-cross and in several mountain bike disciplines (enduro, cross-country and downhill). As of January 2025, she has a total of 77 career victories across these four disciplines. She won the women's elite race at the British National Cyclo-cross Championships in 2020 and 2022. She topped the women's enduro rankings in the 2024 UCI Mountain Bike World Cup.

From 2025, she races for the AON Racing downhill team founded that year by Reece Wilson, having ridden for Trek Factory Racing in cyclo-cross and MTB from 2020 to 2024.

== Early life ==
Harnden is from West Malvern, where she grew up with her two older and one younger brothers. She began cycling at the age of eight and started to compete aged twelve.

== Career ==
As a junior, Harnden competed at the 2018 Youth Olympic Games, and won medals at the 2018 and 2019 European Mountain Bike Championships. As an elite rider, she became 2020 and 2022British National Cyclo-cross Champion. At the age of 20, she became the youngest ever winner of an women's elite Enduro World Series (EWS) race when she took the victory at La Thuile in 2021.

In 2023, Harnden won the UK Downhill National Championships. She came in five seconds before her competitors to secure the National Championship jersey alongside her jerseys in cyclo-cross and cross-country.

She took the overall series title for elite women's enduro in the 2024 UCI Mountain Bike World Cup.

She won her first UCI downhill race in Les Gets on August 22, 2026. The win meant she claimed a €100,000 purse provided by Gates belt drives. The cash prize was offered to the first rider to win a UCI downhill race on a bike that used a belt powered drivetrain, as opposed to a conventional chain.
