= Erice van Leuven =

New Zealand downhill mountain biker (born 2006)

Personal information
- Born: 30 November 2006 (age 19) Wellington, New Zealand

Cycling career
- Sport: Cycling
- Current team: Norco Factory Racing
- Disciplines: Downhill; Enduro
- Role: Professional Mountain Biker
- Rider type: Downhill (DHI) Enduro (EDR) Freeride

Professional teams
- Norco Factory Racing
- Commencal Les Orres

Major wins
- UCI DHI World Champion Junior Women 2023 and 2024 UCI Downhill World Cup Overall Champion Junior Women 2024 Six World Cup Junior (U19) DHI wins in 2024 in Leogang (Austria), Loudenvielle (France) and Mont Ste-Anne (Canada) and in 2023 in Lenzerheide (Switzerland), Pal Arinsal (Andorra) and Snowshoe (USA); three second places in Bielsko-BIala (Poland)(2024), Val di Sole (2023) and Loudenvielle (2023); and a third place in Val di Sole (2023) Monster Pro Downhill Series 2024 – two Pro Women wins, in Mountain Creek (NY, USA, May 2024) and Snow Summit (Big Bear Lake, CA, USA, August 2024), and a second place (Ride Rock Creek, WC, USA, April 2024) Winner of World Cup U21 EDR race in Derby, Tasmania, and second place in Maydena, Tasmania (both 2023)
Medal record
Women's mountain bike racing
Representing New Zealand
World Championships
Gold medal – first place	2023 Glasgow	Junior downhill
Gold medal – first place	2024 Vallnord	Junior downhill

Erice van Leuven (born 30 November 2006) is a New Zealand downhill mountain biker. She is the current UCI Downhill Junior Women's World Champion, having won the title two years in a row in 2023 and 2024, and also the 2024 UCI World Cup Overall Champion for Junior Women.

She has won seven UCI MTB World Cup races (six in Downhill and one in Enduro). With these achievements, Erice is part of a small group of riders who have achieved either of those ‘doubles’ (back-to-back World Champ or World Champ/World Cup Champion in one year).

She was a finalist in New Zealand’s prestigious Halberg Awards held in February 2024, in the Sky Sport Emerging Talent category, and is a finalist for the same award in 205; and she was College Sports Wellington Supreme Sportswoman of the Year 2023 and 2024.

A freerider as well, Erice is the Official Whip-Off World Champion having placed first in the event held at Whistler in July 2024, and she also won the award for Best Whip at the US Open in September 2024. Previously she won the honour of being named ‘Dark Horse’ at the women’s Dark Horse Invitational freeride event at Revelstoke, Canada in 2022.

Despite her young age, Erice is ranked the 12th best female gravity mountain biker in the world.

In late 2024, Erice was named as one of eight women invited internationally to compete in the legendary Red Bull Hardline in Maydena, Tasmania in February 2025.

== Career ==
Van Leuven began riding at age 7 with her older brothers, exploring local trails and creating jumps in her family's garden.

At age 10, a YouTube video of her riding trails in Rotorua, NZ on a 16-inch coaster break bike gained traction and caught the attention of bike brands including Commencal.

She went on to race recreationally around Wellington and greater New Zealand. In 2019 she was invited to Andorra to ride with the Commencal Kids project, and in 2022 she raced in Europe for the first time at the French Cup in Châtel.

In 2023 she signed with the Commencal Les Orres race team and began competing on the World Cup circuit primarily in Downhill with some Enduro races. She won the most World Cup Downhill races in 2023 of any of the Junior Women – winning three races, in Lenzerheide, Pal Arinsal and Snowshoe – and she placed second in two others. In the two Enduro World Cup races she competed in, she won at Derby, Tasmania, winning every one of the six stages, and came second in Maydena, with two stage wins. In August 2023 she became Junior World Champion at Fort William, Scotland, ahead of her New Zealand compatriots Poppy Lane and Sacha Earnest in 2nd and 3rd places respectively.

In 2024, continuing with Commencal Les Orres, her World Cup year began with a remarkable performance at Fort William seeing her ahead for the first three splits despite a flat early on in the race, ending up in 5th place. She went on to win three World Cup races again – this year in Leogang, Loudenvielle and Mont Ste-Anne, culminating in becoming the overall World Cup Champion alongside her World Championship title, which she defended in Pal Arinsal, Andorra by a convincing 6.3 second margin.

In 2025 she signed with Norco Factory Racing, with Greg Minnaar as team director and Alan Milway as team manager and coach.

At the Red Bull Hardline race at the Maydena Bike Park in Tasmania on 8 February 2025, van Leuven crashed at an 85 ft (26 m) gap jump. She broke her back, neck and wrist, lacerated her liver and punctured her lung. If she receives permission to travel home to New Zealand, she plans to attend the Halberg Awards on 18 February.

== Personal life ==
Van Leuven was born in 2006. She grew up in Te Awakairangi Lower Hutt and was a student at Raphael House Rudolf Steiner School, graduating in 2024.

== Results ==
=== Downhill ===
2024

1st place Junior Women (U19): UCI Mountain Bike Downhill World Cup Overall

1st place Junior Women (U19): UCI Mountain Bike Downhill World Cup, Mont Ste-Anne, Canada

1st place Junior Women (U19): UCI Mountain Bike Downhill World Cup, Loudenvielle, France

1st place Junior Women (U19): UCI Cycling World Championships Downhill, Pal Arinsal, Andorra

1st Place Pro Women: Monster Pro Downhill Series, Snow Summit, USA

3rd Place Junior Women (U19): UCI Mountain Bike Junior Downhill World Cup, Val di Sole Trentino, Italy

1st place Junior Women (U19): UCI Mountain Bike Junior Downhill World Cup, Leogang, Austria

1st Place Pro Women: Monster Pro Downhill Series, Mountain Creek, New York, USA

2nd place Junior Women (U19): UCI Mountain Bike Junior Downhill World Cup, Bielslo-Biala, Poland

2023

3rd Place: UCI Mountain Bike Junior Downhill World Cup Overall

1st Place: UCI Mountain Bike Junior Downhill World Cup, Showshoe, West Virginia

2nd Place: UCI Mountain Bike Junior Downhill World Cup, Loudenvielle-Peyragudes, France (based on qualifying results as the final race was cancelled)

1st Place: UCI Mountain Bike Junior Downhill World Cup, Pal Arinsal, Andorra

1st Place: Coupe de France / French Cup, Châtel (3rd overall elite women)

1st Place: UCI Cycling World Championships Junior Downhill, Fort William, Scotland

2nd Place: UCI Mountain Bike Junior Downhill World Cup, Val di Sole Trentino, Italy

1st Place: UCI Mountain Bike Junior Downhill World Cup, Lenzerheide, Switzerland

1st Place: Coupe de France / French Cup, La Grand-Combe (1st overall elite women)

2nd Place: Cycling New Zealand National Champs U19, Coronet Peak, Queenstown, NZ (3rd overall women)

2022

3rd Place: Coupe de France / French Cup, Châtel

2nd Place: Cycling New Zealand National Champs U17, Christchurch, NZ (6th overall women)

=== Enduro ===
2023

1st Place: UCI Mountain Bike U21 Enduro World Cup, Derby, Australia

2nd Place: UCI Mountain Bike U21 Enduro World Cup, Maydena, Australia

=== Freeride ===
2024

Winner Best Whip, US Open, Killington, VT, USA, September 2024

Winner Official Whip Off World Championships, Whistler, Canada, July 2024

2022

'Dark Horse' women's freeride invitational, Revelstoke, Canada. Named 2022 'Dark Horse'

'Hangtime' women's freeride invitational, Bellingham, WA, USA
