= Malene Degin =

Danish cyclist

Personal information
- Born: 1996 (age 29–30)

Cycling career
- Sport: Cycling
- Disciplines: Cross-Country; Mountain bike racing
- Role: Rider
Medal record
World Championships
Bronze medal – third place	2018 Lenzerheide	Team relay

Malene Degin (born 1996) is a Danish cross-country cyclist.

She participated at the 2018 UCI Mountain Bike World Championships, winning a medal.
