= Marcin Karczyński =

Polish cyclist

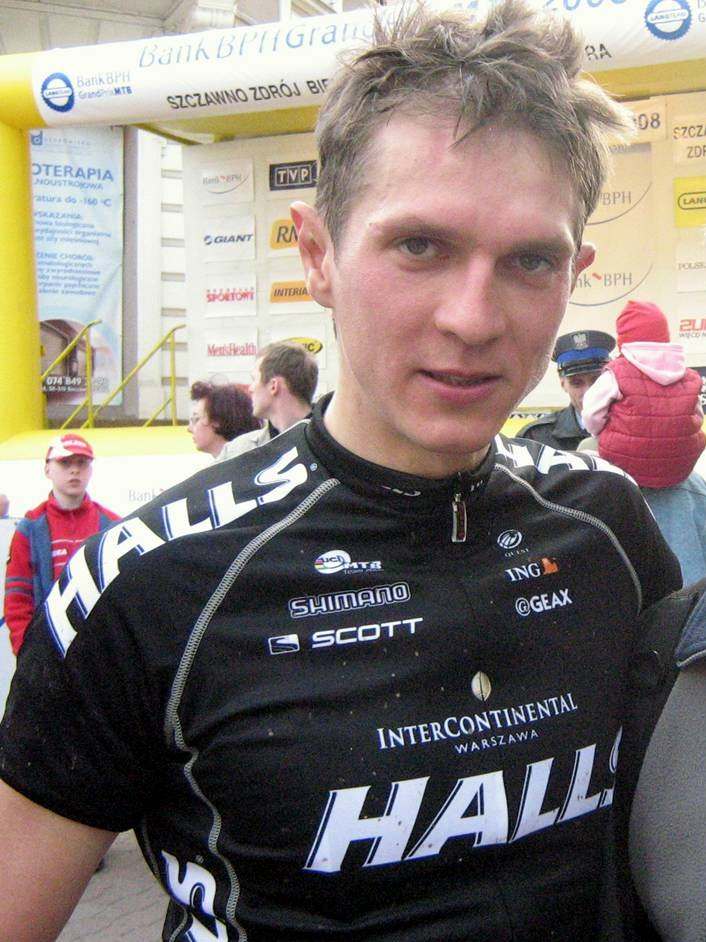
- Karczyński in 2008

Personal information
- Born: 6 July 1978 (age 48) Sanok, Poland

Cycling career
- Sport: Cycling

Marcin Karczyński (born 6 July 1978) is a Polish cyclist. He competed in the men's cross-country mountain biking event at the 2004 Summer Olympics.
