= Chloe Taylor =

Chloe Taylor may refer to:

- Chloë Taylor (philosopher) (born 1976), Canadian philosopher
- Chloe Taylor (soccer) (born 2008), Canadian soccer player
