= Hugo Pigeon =

French cyclist (born 1996)

Personal information
- Born: 15 September 1996 (age 30) Avignon, France

Cycling career
- Sport: Cycling
- Disciplines: Mountain biking; Road; Cyclo-cross
- Role: Rider

Amateur teams
- 2015–2017: Chambéry CF
- 2018: Creuse Oxygen Guéret
Medal record
Representing France
Mountain bike racing
World Championships
Gold medal – first place	2014 Hafjell	Mixed team relay
Silver medal – second place	2021 Val di Sole	Electric MTB Cross-country
Silver medal – second place	2025 Valais	E-MTB Cross-Enduro
Bronze medal – third place	2024 Vallnord	E-MTB Cross-country
Bronze medal – third place	2025 Valais	E-MTB Cross-country
European Championships
Gold medal – first place	2014 Sankt Wendel	Mixed team relay

Hugo Pigeon (born 15 September 1996 in Avignon) is a French cyclist, who specializes in mountain biking.

== Major results ==
2013
2nd Cross-country, National Junior Mountain Bike Championships
2014
1st Mixed team relay, UCI Mountain Bike & Trials World Championships
1st Mixed team relay, UEC European Mountain Bike Championships
1st Cross-country, National Junior Mountain Bike Championships
2nd National Junior Cyclo-cross Championships
2023
1st Megavalanche, enduro mountain bike race at Alpe d'Huez
2024
1st Megavalanche, enduro mountain bike race at Alpe d'Huez
3rd Cross-country, UCI World E-MTB Championships
2025
1st Megavalanche, enduro mountain bike race at Alpe d'Huez
2026
1st Megavalanche, enduro mountain bike race at Alpe d'Huez
