= Martin Maes =

Belgian cyclist

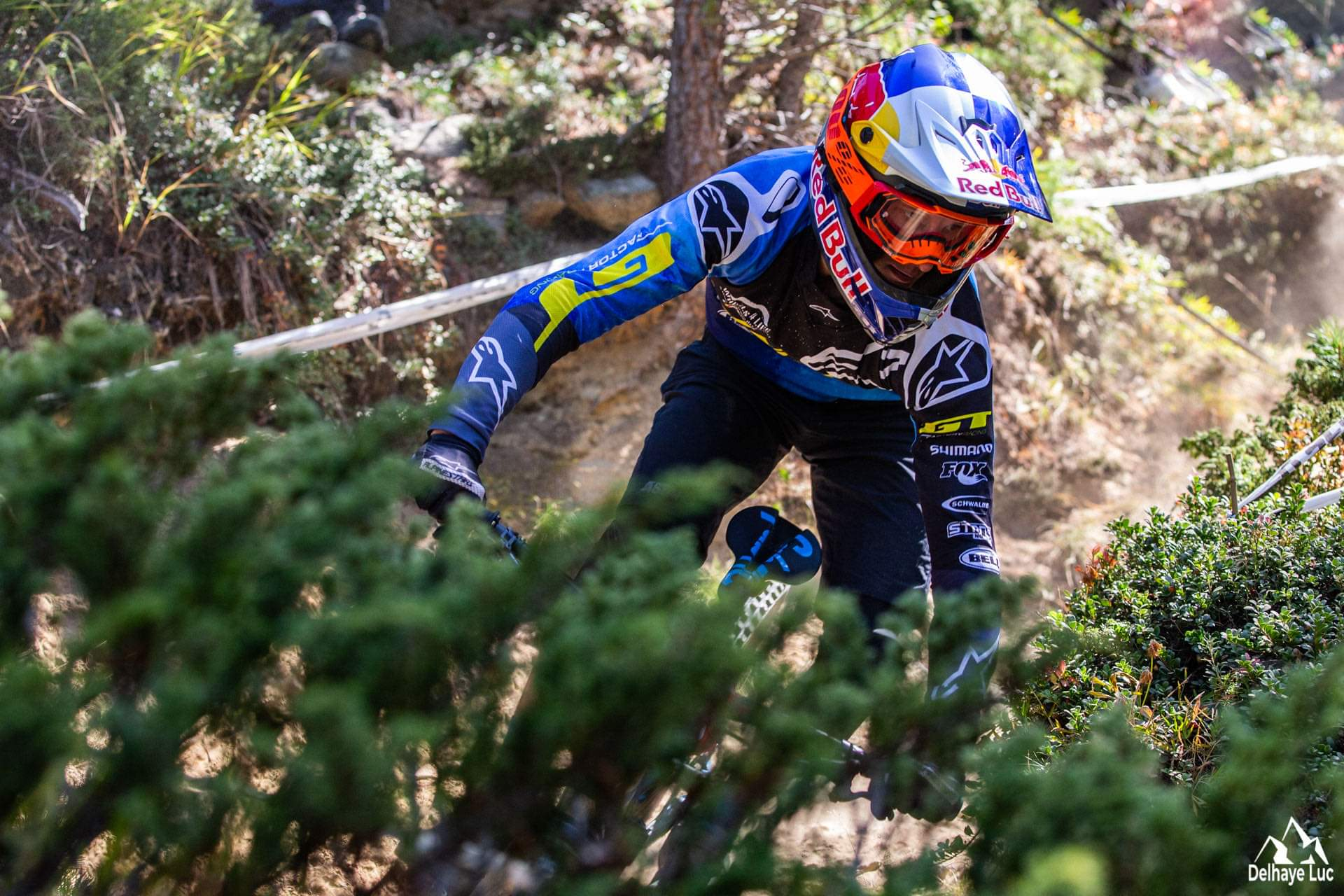

Personal information
- Born: 27 January 1997 (age 29) Liège, Belgium

Cycling career
- Sport: Cycling
- Disciplines: Enduro; Mountain bike racing Downhill
- Role: Rider
Medal record
World Championships
Silver medal – second place	2018 Lenzerheide	Downhill

Martin Maes (born 27 January 1997) is a Belgian Enduro and Downhill cyclist.

He participated at the 2018 UCI Mountain Bike World Championships, winning a medal.
