= Leon Kaiser =

German cross-country cyclist

Personal information
- Born: 6 January 2000 (age 26)

Cycling career
- Sport: Cycling
- Disciplines: Cross-Country; Mountain bike racing
- Role: Rider
Medal record
World Championships
Silver medal – second place	2018 Lenzerheide	Team relay

Leon Kaiser (born 6 January 2000) is a German cross-country cyclist.

He participated at the 2018 UCI Mountain Bike World Championships, winning a medal.
