= Mairiporã =

- Municipality
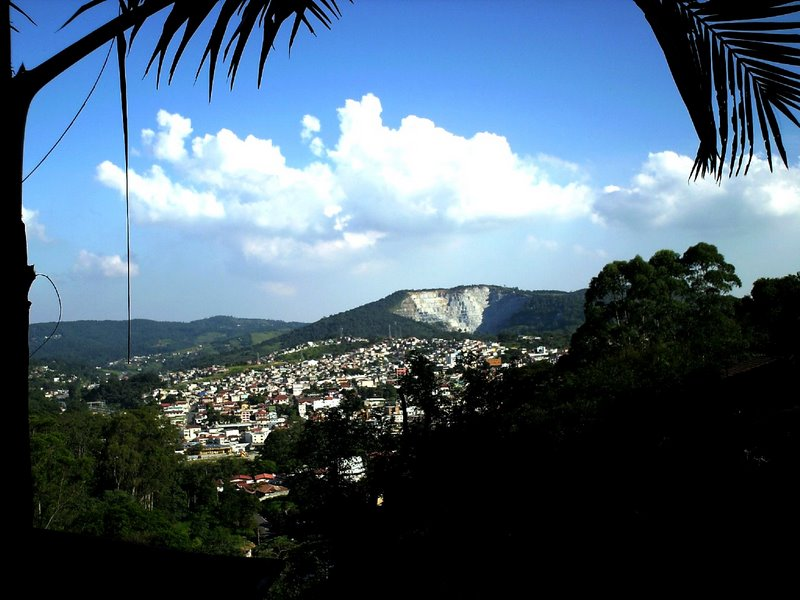

- Flag Coat of arms

- Location in São Paulo state

- Location in Brazil
- Coordinates: 23°19′8″S 46°35′13″W
- Country: Brazil
- Region: Southeast
- State: São Paulo

Area
  - Total: 321 km^{2} (124 sq mi)

Population (2020)
  - Total: 101,937
  - Density: 318/km^{2} (822/sq mi)
- Time zone: UTC−3 (BRT)
- Website: www.mairipora.sp.gov.br

Mairiporã is a Brazilian municipality in São Paulo state. It is part of the São Paulo metropolitan area. The population is 101,937 (2020 est.) in an area of 321 km^{2} (124 sq mi).

== History ==
It became a municipality in 1889, separating from Guarulhos, it was named "Juqueri", and it comprised also what today are the cities of Franco da Rocha, Caieiras and Francisco Morato. The current name was adopted in December 1948, and means "beautiful city" (mairy: village, city + poranga: beautiful).

== Geography ==
Mairiporã is situated at an average altitude of 790m. The highest points of Mairiporã are in Serra da Cantareira, where it reaches an altitude of over 1100m in some areas.

Climate: Like in all of the São Paulo metropolitan area, the climate is subtropical. Summer is considerably warm and rainy while the winter is mild. The average annual temperature is about 18 °C. The coldest month is July with an average 14 °C and the warmest February with an average 22 °C. The annual pluviometric index is about 1400mm.

=== Roads ===
BR-381 Rodovia Fernão Dias.

Road connecting São Paulo Capital City to Belo Horizonte in the state of Minas Gerais. BR-381 crosses Mairiporã from south to north, from Parque suíço in the south to Terra Preta in the north.

SP-023 Rodovia Prefeito Luiz Salomão Chamma.

Connects SP-332 Rodovia Tancredo de Almeida Neves in Franco da Rocha to BR-381 Rodovia Fernão Dias.

== Demography ==
Historical population (municipality)
| Year | Population | %± |
|---|---|---|
| 1920 | 9,096 |
| 1940 | 24,851 | 173.2% |
| 1950 | 9,386 | −62.2% |
| 1960 | 12,842 | 36.8% |
| 1970 | 19,584 | 52.5% |
| 1980 | 27,540 | 40.6% |
| 1991 | 39,937 | 45.0% |
| 2000 | 60,111 | 50.5% |
| 2010 | 80,956 | 34.7% |
| 2022 | 93,853 | 15.9% |

=== Demographics ===
Data from 2000 Census

Total population - 60.111

- Urban Population - 48,077
- Rural Population - 12,034
- Men - 30,214
- Women - 29,897

Population density: 186.97 people per km2

Infant mortality: 18.60 per thousand

Life expectancy: 69.82 years

Total fertility rate: 2.22 per woman

Literacy rate: 90.7%

Human Development Index: 0.803

- Standard of living: 0.784
- Life Expectancy: 0.747
- Education: 0.877

(Source: IPEADATA)

== Media ==
In telecommunications, the city was served by Telecomunicações de São Paulo. In July 1998, this company was acquired by Telefónica, which adopted the Vivo brand in 2012. The company is currently an operator of cell phones, fixed lines, internet (fiber optics/4G) and television (satellite and cable).

== Tourism ==
The municipality includes part of Cantareira State Park, a 7,917-hectare (19,560-acre) protected area established in 1962 that safeguards a significant portion of the water sources supplying the São Paulo metropolitan region. Located in the Serra da Cantareira, north of São Paulo, Mairiporã is known for its natural surroundings and outdoor recreational activities. Attractions include Paragliding at Pico do Olho D'água, downhill trails at Trilha da Saracura, and hiking routes such as Trilha dos Macacos, which features waterfalls.

== Gallery ==
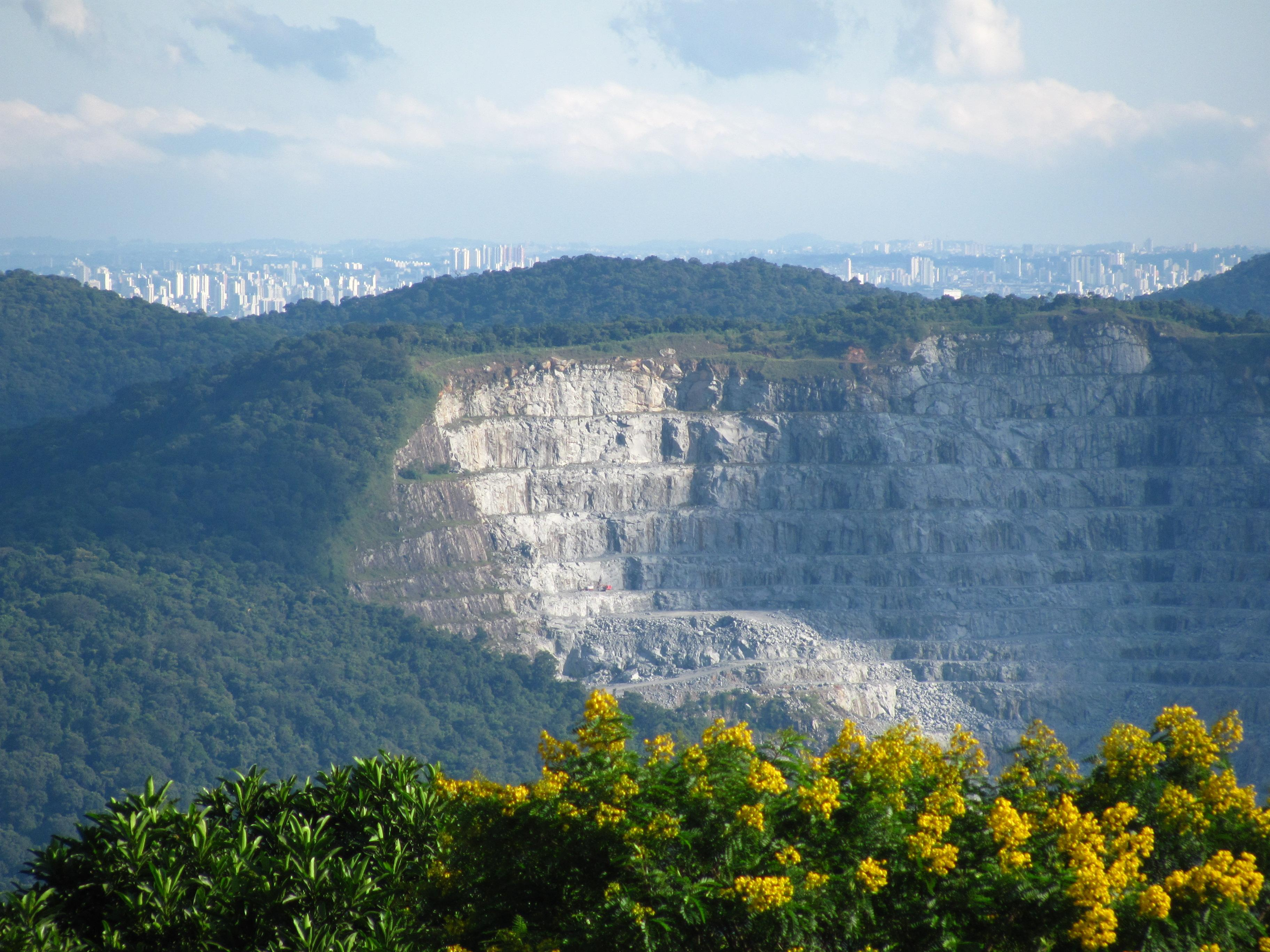
São Paulo view from Pico do olho d'água, highest place in the city

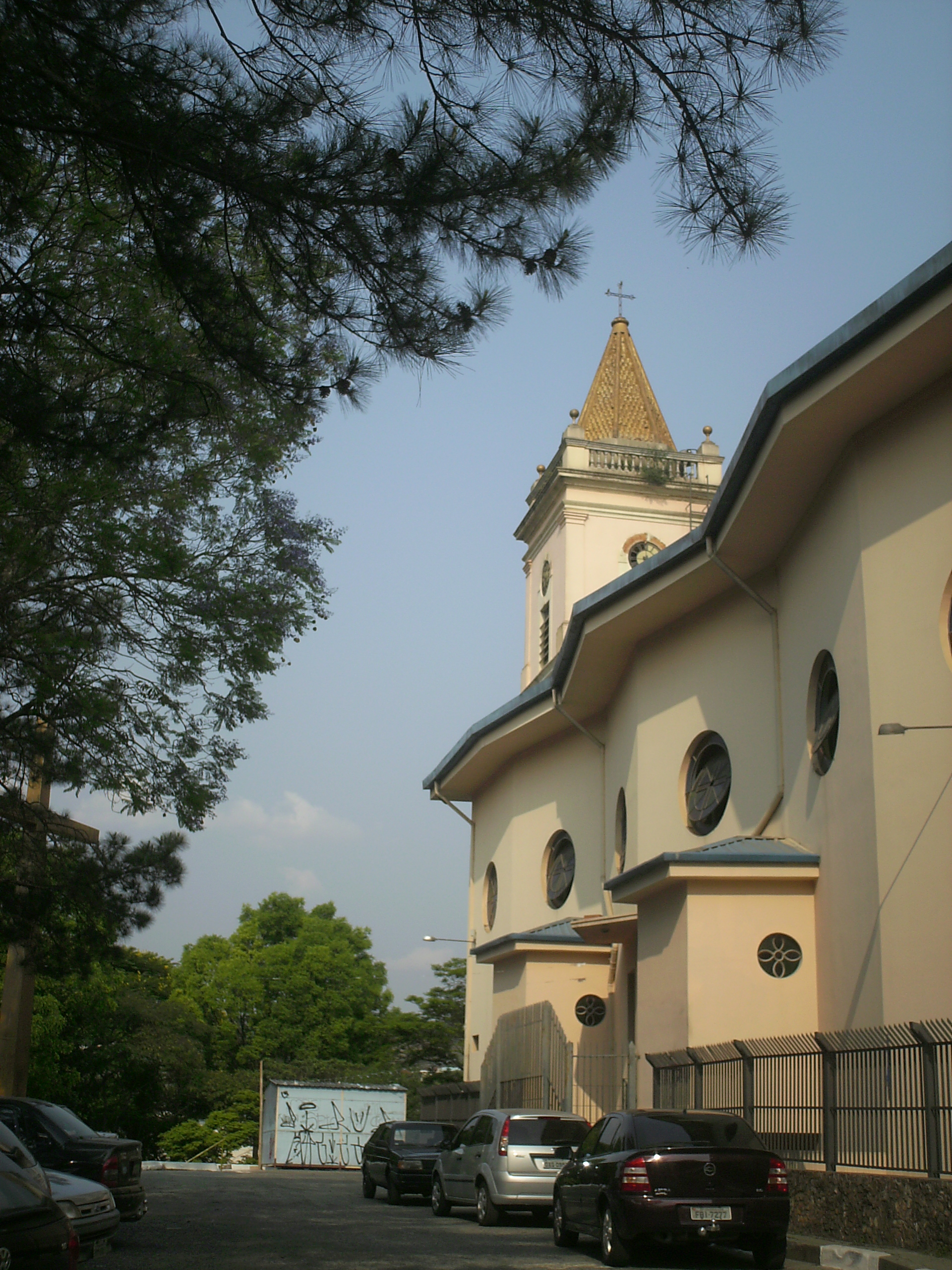
View of Nossa Senhora do Desterro Church

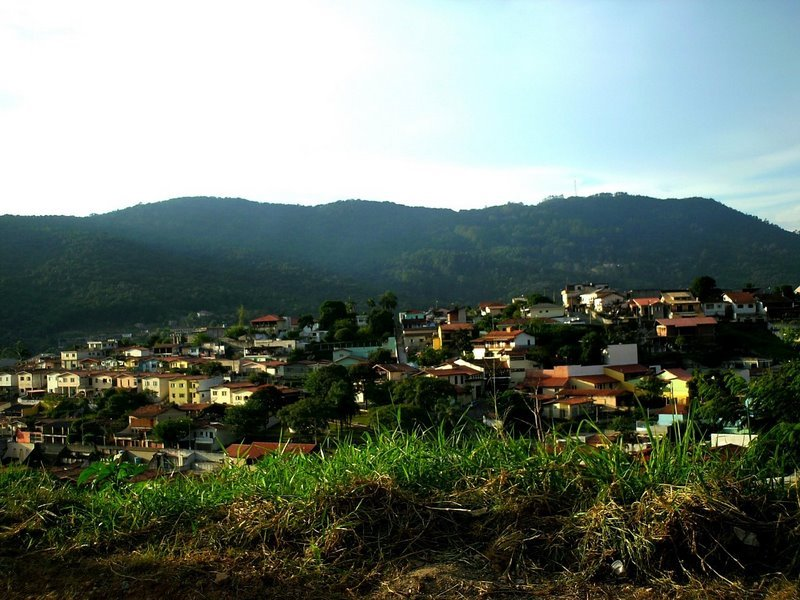
Neighborhood in Mairiporã city center

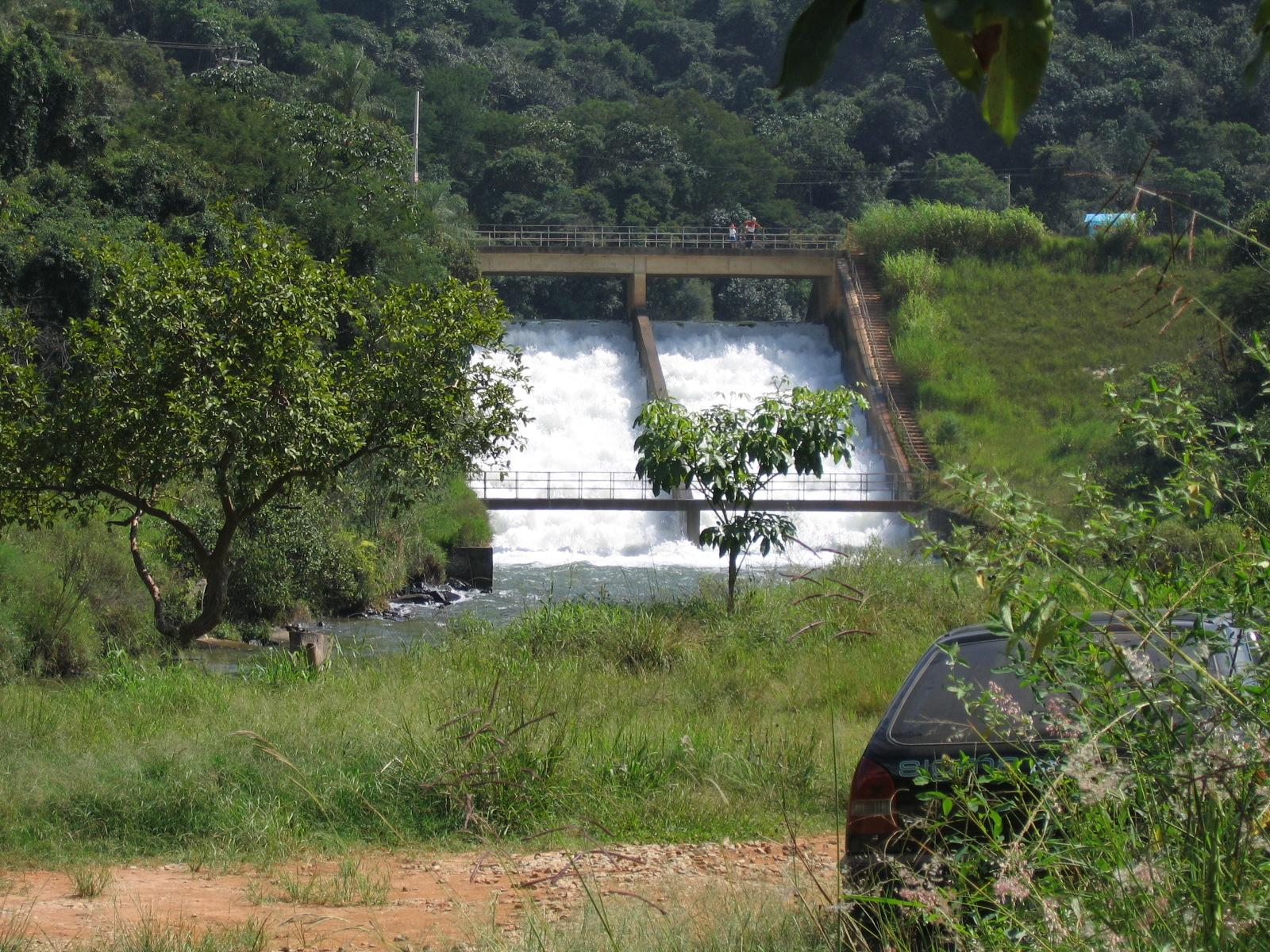
Sete Quedas(Seven Falls) Dam and waterfall

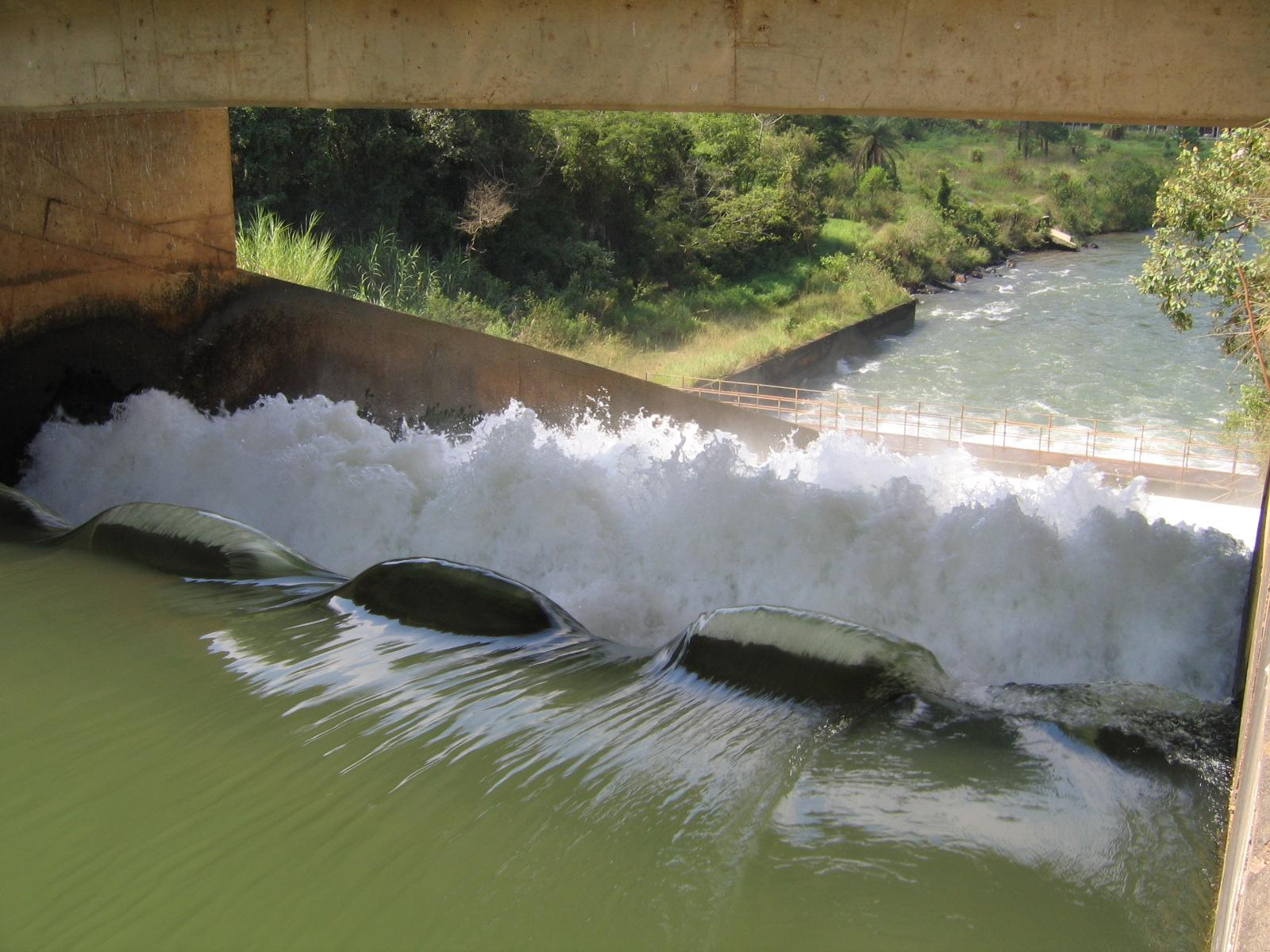
Sete Quedas(Seven Falls) Dam and waterfall

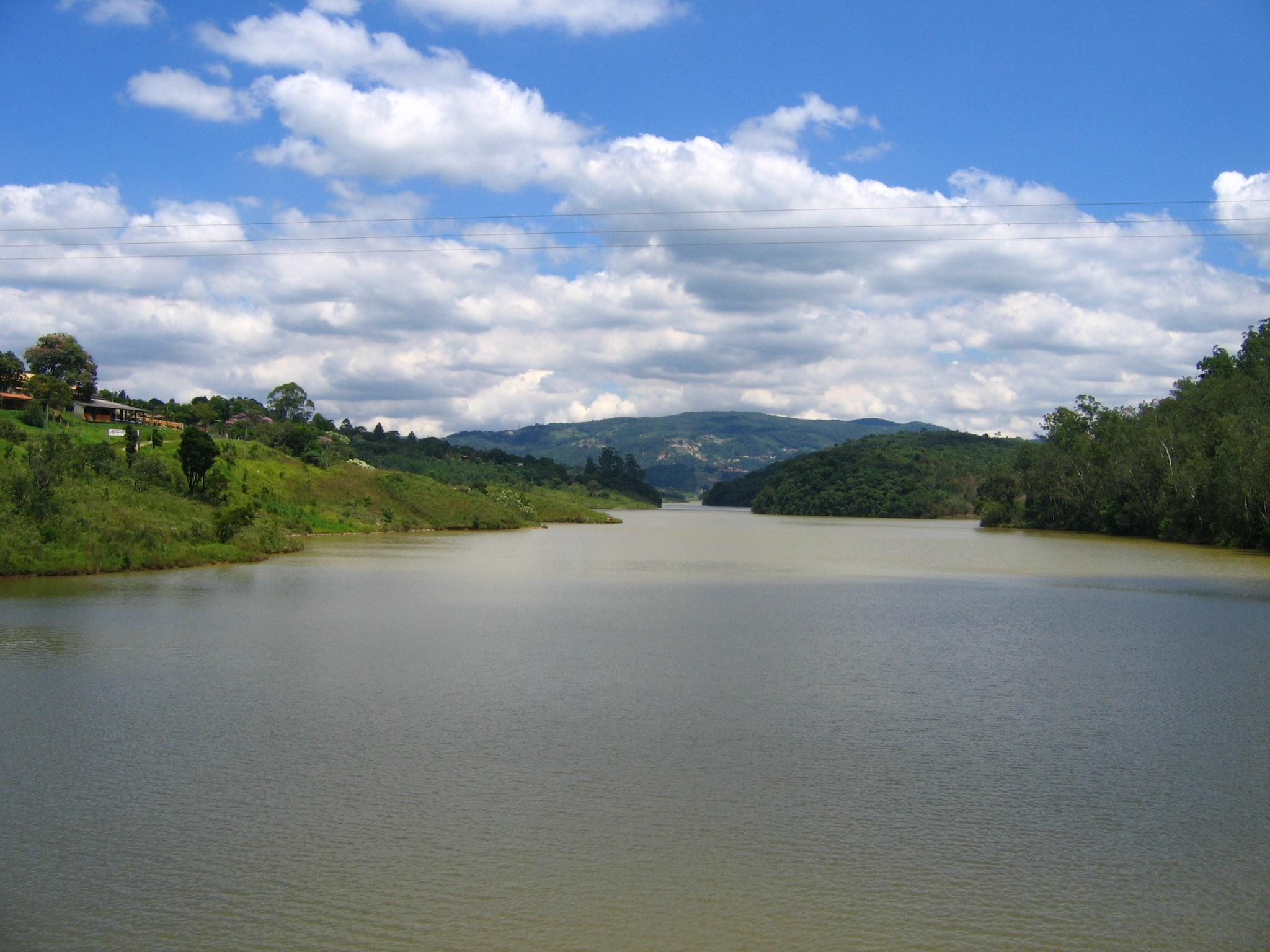

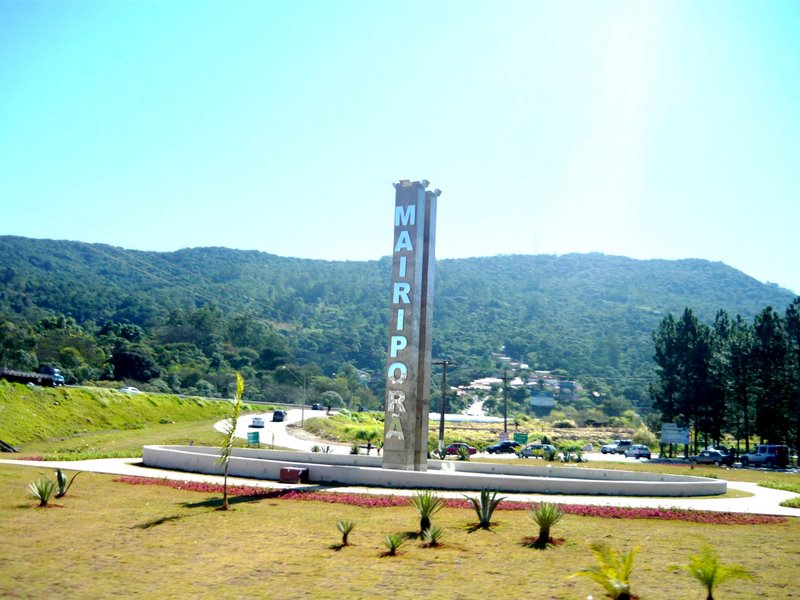
Mairiporã city entrance

== See also ==
- List of municipalities in São Paulo
