= Enduro mountain biking =

Type of mountain bike racing

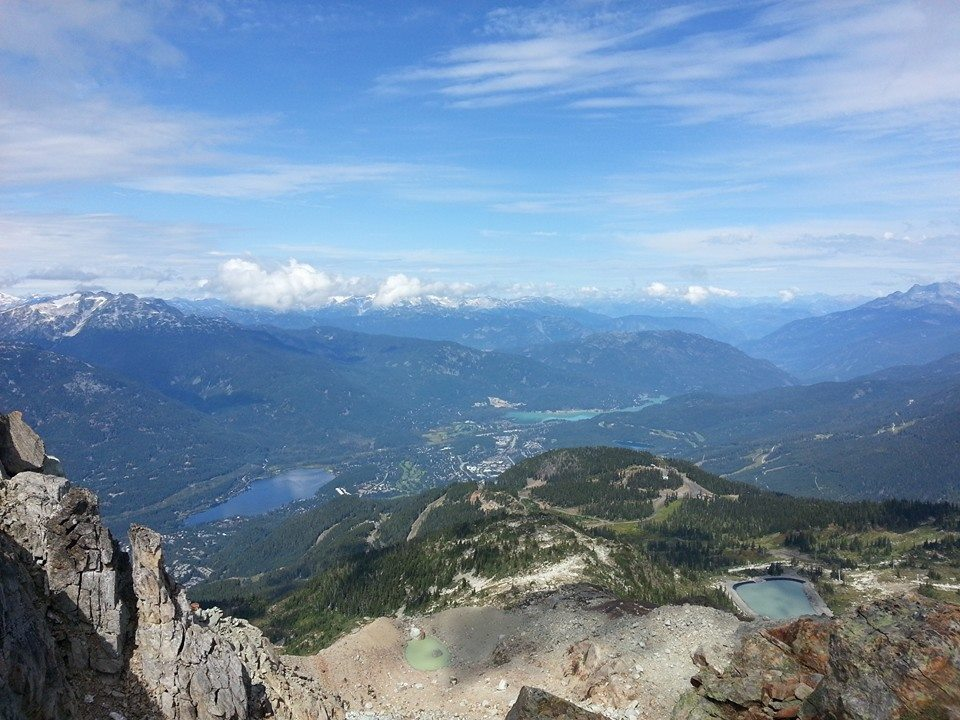
View from "Top of the World" trail in Whistler B.C., the start of a stage of the Whistler Crankworx Enduro Race.

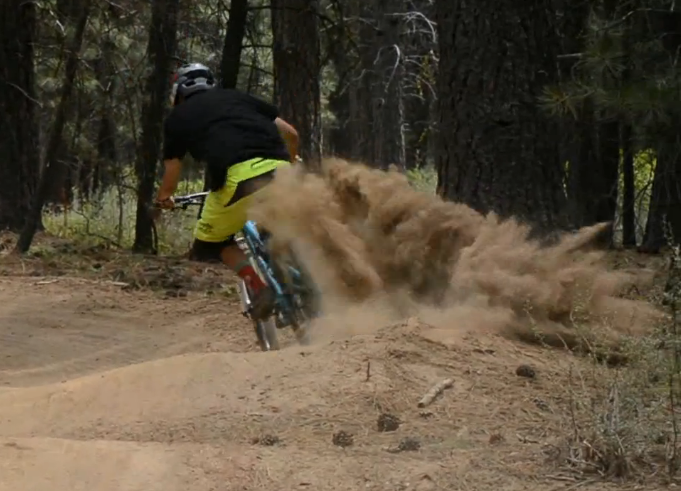
A rider hitting a berm during a race in the Oregon Enduro Series.

Enduro is a type of mountain bike racing where the downhills are timed, and the uphills are mandatory but not timed. Riders are timed in stages that are primarily downhill, with neutral "transfer" stages in between. The transfer stages usually must be completed within a time-limit, but are not part of the accumulated time.

== Background ==
Enduros typically take place over one or two days, however, week-long competitions also exist such as the Trans-Savoie (France), the Andes Pacifico (Chile), and the Pisgah Stage Race (United States). A typical one-day enduro consists of 3 to 5 timed stages which take place on technically demanding, generally descending terrain, and often with sections of singletrack. These stages are linked by predominantly ascending "transfer" stages. Although a rider's performance on the physically demanding transfer stages does not affect their result, they often have a time-limit, or a latest allowed arrival-time for the start of the next stage.

According to the Enduro World Series 2015 Rule Book, a minimum of four special stages is required per event, a minimum of three different courses must be used, and the results will be calculated by adding all stage times together for each rider.

Enduro differs from cross-country (XC) racing which usually has more emphasis on cardiovascular fitness and less emphasis on technical ability, and pure downhill racing, which may contain little to no cross-country or climbing. Enduro's 'All Mountain' discipline therefore favours riders with a breadth of skill, on multi-discipline cycles. Lightweight XC bikes may lack sufficient suspension for fast downhill control, while full downhill bikes may not allow a rider to climb the uphill sections efficiently.

In some countries, the term enduro is considered a contraction of "endurance".

== Origins ==
The origins of enduro mountain bike racing come from some inspiration from both car rally such as the World Rally Championship and motorbike enduro racing. Mountain bike enduro is essentially the competitive side of the mountain biking format often referred to today as "All-Mountain". It arose from everyday mountain bike riding, which originally entailed riding to the top of the mountain and then racing to the bottom.

The first reported enduro race, using the modern format, was held in August 2003 in Val d'Allos. Earlier enduro-style local races were run in Italy, New Zealand, and the UK during the 1980s and 1990s. A precursor to the modern enduro format was the rallye format based on time stages and unlimited liaisons. However these races, located in France, tended to be more cross-country rather than downhill orientated.

Many early American enduro riders credit the town of Novato, California as a birthplace of this style of riding. Professional enduro riders like Mark Weir, Marco Osborne and Ben Cruz hail from Novato.

== The bikes ==
Modern enduro bikes are characterized by long-travel suspension systems —typically ranging from 150 to 180 mm— these bikes are built to handle steep, technical descents while retaining sufficient efficiency for uphill pedaling. Modern enduro bikes feature slack head tube angles (around 63–65 degrees) for enhanced downhill stability, steep seat tube angles (75–78 degrees) for improved climbing position, and are commonly equipped with 29-inch or mixed wheel sizes (mullet setups) for optimized rollover and maneuverability. They incorporate robust frame constructions, wide handlebars, dropper seatposts, powerful disc brakes, and wide-range 1x drivetrains to tackle diverse terrain. Enduro bikes bridge the gap between downhill and trail bikes, making them well-suited for riders seeking high-speed control on descents with the versatility to climb without mechanical assistance.

== See also ==
- Cycling
- Mountain biking
- Downhill mountain biking
- Funduro
- Glossary of cycling
