= 2026 UCI Mountain Bike World Cup =

Series of races for all-terrain bicyclists

- Thirty-seventh edition of the UCI Mountain Bike World Cup

Details
- Dates: February–October 2026
- Races: 10 (XCO); 10 (DHI)

The 2026 UCI Mountain Bike World Cup is a series of races in Olympic Cross-Country (XCO), Cross-Country Eliminator (XCE), and Downhill (DHI). Each discipline has an Elite Men and an Elite Women category. There are also under-23 categories in the XCO and junior categories in the DHI. The series has eight rounds both cross-country and downhill, some of which are held concurrently. In 2023, enduro was added to the UCI World Cup series.

== Cross-country ==
=== Elite ===
Date	Venue	Podium (Men)	Podium (Women)
3 May	(South Korea) Mona Yongpyong	Dario Lillo (SUI)	Sina Frei (SUI)
3 May	(South Korea) Mona Yongpyong	Luca Martin (FRA)	Jenny Rissveds (SWE)
3 May	(South Korea) Mona Yongpyong	Charlie Aldridge (GBR)	Madigan Munro (USA)
24 May	(Czech Republic) Nové Město na Moravě	Tom Pidcock (GBR)	Laura Stigger (AUT)
24 May	(Czech Republic) Nové Město na Moravě	Luca Martin (FRA)	Jenny Rissveds (SWE)
24 May	(Czech Republic) Nové Město na Moravě	Filippo Colombo (SUI)	Sina Frei (SUI)
14 June	(Austria) Saalfelden–Leogang	Adrien Boichis (FRA)	Jenny Rissveds (SWE)
14 June	(Austria) Saalfelden–Leogang	Luca Martin (FRA)	Puck Pieterse (NED)
14 June	(Austria) Saalfelden–Leogang	Bjorn Riley (USA)	Alessandra Keller (SUI)
21 June	(Switzerland) Lenzerheide	Luca Martin (FRA)	Jenny Rissveds (SWE)
21 June	(Switzerland) Lenzerheide	Adrien Boichis (FRA)	Ronja Blöchlinger (SUI)
21 June	(Switzerland) Lenzerheide	Bjorn Riley (USA)	Savilia Blunk (USA)
5 July	(Italy) La Thuile	Luca Martin (FRA)	Martina Berta (ITA)
5 July	(Italy) La Thuile	Mathis Azzaro (FRA)	Savilia Blunk (USA)
5 July	(Italy) La Thuile	Adrien Boichis (FRA)	Laura Stigger (AUT)
12 July	(Andorra) Pal–Arinsal	Adrien Boichis (FRA)	Jenny Rissveds (SWE)
12 July	(Andorra) Pal–Arinsal	Mathis Azzaro (FRA)	Martina Berta (ITA)
12 July	(Andorra) Pal–Arinsal	Luca Schwarzbauer (GER)	Sina Frei (SUI)
23 August	(France) Les Gets	Adrien Boichis (FRA)	Sina Frei (SUI)
23 August	(France) Les Gets	Mathieu van der Poel (NED)	Jenny Rissveds (SWE)
23 August	(France) Les Gets	Martín Vidaurre (CHL)	Savilia Blunk (USA)
20 September	(United States) Soldier Hollow	Martín Vidaurre (CHL)	Martina Berta (ITA)
20 September	(United States) Soldier Hollow	Cole Punchard (CAN)	Gwendalyn Gibson (USA)
20 September	(United States) Soldier Hollow	Mathis Guay (FRA)	Sina Frei (SUI)
3 October	(United States) Lake Placid	Charlie Aldridge (GBR)	Sina Frei (SUI)
3 October	(United States) Lake Placid	Filippo Colombo (SUI)	Martina Berta (ITA)
3 October	(United States) Lake Placid	Martín Vidaurre (CHL)	Sammie Maxwell (NZL)

=== Under 23 ===
Date	Venue	Podium (Men)	Podium (Women)
3 May	(South Korea) Mona Yongpyong	Nicolas Halter (SUI)	Valentina Corvi (ITA)
3 May	(South Korea) Mona Yongpyong	Paul Schehl (GER)	Elina Benoit (SUI)
3 May	(South Korea) Mona Yongpyong	Thibaut François (ESP)	Bailey Cioppa (USA)
23 May	(Czech Republic) Nové Město na Moravě	Thibaut François (ESP)	Katrin Embacher (AUT)
23 May	(Czech Republic) Nové Město na Moravě	Alix André-Gallis (FRA)	Anina Hutter (SUI)
23 May	(Czech Republic) Nové Město na Moravě	Naël Rouffiac (FRA)	Valentina Corvi (ITA)
14 June	(Austria) Saalfelden–Leogang	Paul Schehl (GER)	Valentina Corvi (ITA)
14 June	(Austria) Saalfelden–Leogang	Alix André-Gallis (FRA)	Fiona Schibler (SUI)
14 June	(Austria) Saalfelden–Leogang	Naël Rouffiac (FRA)	Monique Halter (SUI)
21 June	(Switzerland) Lenzerheide	Paul Schehl (GER)	Valentina Corvi (ITA)
21 June	(Switzerland) Lenzerheide	Thibaut François (ESP)	Lisa Kristine Jorde (NOR)
21 June	(Switzerland) Lenzerheide	Rens Teunissen van Manen (NED)	Makena Kellerman (USA)
5 July	(Italy) La Thuile	Paul Schehl (GER)	Valentina Corvi (ITA)
5 July	(Italy) La Thuile	Nicolas Halter (SUI)	Monique Halter (SUI)
5 July	(Italy) La Thuile	Lucas Teste (FRA)	Ella MacPhee (CAN)
12 July	(Andorra) Pal–Arinsal	Paul Schehl (GER)	Valentina Corvi (ITA)
12 July	(Andorra) Pal–Arinsal	Thibaut François (ESP)	Ella MacPhee (CAN)
12 July	(Andorra) Pal–Arinsal	Nicolas Halter (SUI)	Fiona Schibler (SUI)
23 August	(France) Les Gets	Gustav Heby Pedersen (DEN)	Valentina Corvi (ITA)
23 August	(France) Les Gets	Benjamin Krüger (GER)	Anina Hutter (SUI)
23 August	(France) Les Gets	Paul Schehl (GER)	Katrin Embacher (AUT)
20 September	(United States) Soldier Hollow	Benjamin Krüger (GER)	Valentina Corvi (ITA)
20 September	(United States) Soldier Hollow	Naël Rouffiac (FRA)	Rafaelle Carrier (CAN)
20 September	(United States) Soldier Hollow	Alejandro García Vázquez (ESP)	Makena Kellerman (USA)
3 October	(United States) Lake Placid	Naël Rouffiac (FRA)	Fiona Schibler (SUI)
3 October	(United States) Lake Placid	Benjamin Krüger (GER)	Lisa Kristine Jorde (NOR)
3 October	(United States) Lake Placid	Alix André-Gallis (FRA)	Anina Hutter (SUI)

== Cross-country short track ==
=== Elite ===
Date	Venue	Podium (Men)	Podium (Women)
1 May	(South Korea) Mona Yongpyong	Mathis Azzaro (FRA)	Sina Frei (SUI)
1 May	(South Korea) Mona Yongpyong	Simone Avondetto (ITA)	Evie Richards (GBR)
1 May	(South Korea) Mona Yongpyong	Dario Lillo (SUI)	Martina Berta (ITA)
23 May	(Czech Republic) Nové Město na Moravě	Mathis Azzaro (FRA)	Puck Pieterse (NED)
23 May	(Czech Republic) Nové Město na Moravě	Tom Pidcock (GBR)	Laura Stigger (AUT)
23 May	(Czech Republic) Nové Město na Moravě	Dario Lillo (SUI)	Nicole Koller (SUI)
12 June	(Austria) Saalfelden–Leogang	Simon Andreassen (DEN)	Sina Frei (SUI)
12 June	(Austria) Saalfelden–Leogang	Filippo Colombo (SUI)	Jenny Rissveds (SWE)
12 June	(Austria) Saalfelden–Leogang	Luca Martin (FRA)	Alessandra Keller (SUI)
19 June	(Switzerland) Lenzerheide	Adrien Boichis (FRA)	Savilia Blunk (USA)
19 June	(Switzerland) Lenzerheide	Luca Martin (FRA)	Ronja Blöchlinger (SUI)
19 June	(Switzerland) Lenzerheide	Bjorn Riley (USA)	Alessandra Keller (SUI)
3 July	(Italy) La Thuile	Adrien Boichis (FRA)	Jenny Rissveds (SWE)
3 July	(Italy) La Thuile	Luca Martin (FRA)	Sina Frei (SUI)
3 July	(Italy) La Thuile	Charlie Aldridge (GBR)	Savilia Blunk (USA)
10 July	(Andorra) Pal–Arinsal	Bjorn Riley (USA)	Jenny Rissveds (SWE)
10 July	(Andorra) Pal–Arinsal	Adrien Boichis (FRA)	Laura Stigger (AUT)
10 July	(Andorra) Pal–Arinsal	Christopher Blevins (USA)	Ronja Blöchlinger (SUI)
21 August	(France) Les Gets	Adrien Boichis (FRA)	Sina Frei (SUI)
21 August	(France) Les Gets	Luca Martin (FRA)	Jenny Rissveds (SWE)
21 August	(France) Les Gets	David List (GER)	Savilia Blunk (USA)
19 September	(United States) Soldier Hollow	Sam Gaze (NZL)	Martina Berta (ITA)
19 September	(United States) Soldier Hollow	Luca Martin (FRA)	Alessandra Keller (SUI)
19 September	(United States) Soldier Hollow	Charlie Aldridge (GBR)	Sina Frei (SUI)
2 October	(United States) Lake Placid	Martín Vidaurre (CHL)	Martina Berta (ITA)
2 October	(United States) Lake Placid	Luca Schwarzbauer (GER)	Jenny Rissveds (SWE)
2 October	(United States) Lake Placid	Filippo Colombo (SUI)	Sina Frei (SUI)

=== Under 23 ===
Date	Venue	Podium (Men)	Podium (Women)
1 May	(South Korea) Mona Yongpyong	Thibaut François (ESP)	Makena Kellerman (USA)
1 May	(South Korea) Mona Yongpyong	Gustav Heby Pedersen (DEN)	Valentina Corvi (ITA)
1 May	(South Korea) Mona Yongpyong	Paul Schehl (GER)	Elina Benoit (SUI)
22 May	(Czech Republic) Nové Město na Moravě	Paul Schehl (GER)	Makena Kellerman (USA)
22 May	(Czech Republic) Nové Město na Moravě	Naël Rouffiac (FRA)	Lisa Kristine Jorde (NOR)
22 May	(Czech Republic) Nové Město na Moravě	Alix André-Gallis (FRA)	Valentina Corvi (ITA)
12 June	(Austria) Saalfelden–Leogang	Paul Schehl (GER)	Monique Halter (SUI)
12 June	(Austria) Saalfelden–Leogang	Thibaut François (ESP)	Bloeme Kalis (NED)
12 June	(Austria) Saalfelden–Leogang	Benjamin Krüger (GER)	Katrin Embacher (AUT)
19 June	(Switzerland) Lenzerheide	Paul Schehl (GER)	Bloeme Kalis (NED)
19 June	(Switzerland) Lenzerheide	Naël Rouffiac (FRA)	Valentina Corvi (ITA)
19 June	(Switzerland) Lenzerheide	Thibaut François (ESP)	Rafaelle Carrier (CAN)
3 July	(Italy) La Thuile	Paul Schehl (GER)	Valentina Corvi (ITA)
3 July	(Italy) La Thuile	Thibaut François (ESP)	Bloeme Kalis (NED)
3 July	(Italy) La Thuile	Nicolas Halter (SUI)	Monique Halter (SUI)
10 July	(Andorra) Pal–Arinsal	Paul Schehl (GER)	Valentina Corvi (ITA)
10 July	(Andorra) Pal–Arinsal	Thibaut François (ESP)	Lisa Kristine Jorde (NOR)
10 July	(Andorra) Pal–Arinsal	Nicolas Halter (SUI)	Rafaelle Carrier (CAN)
21 August	(France) Les Gets	Gustav Heby Pedersen (DEN)	Valentina Corvi (ITA)
21 August	(France) Les Gets	Paul Schehl (GER)	Monique Halter (SUI)
21 August	(France) Les Gets	Benjamin Krüger (GER)	Anina Hutter (SUI)
19 September	(United States) Soldier Hollow	Nicolas Halter (SUI)	Rafaelle Carrier (CAN)
19 September	(United States) Soldier Hollow	Nikolaj Hougs (DEN)	Makena Kellerman (USA)
19 September	(United States) Soldier Hollow	Gustav Heby Pedersen (DEN)	Bloeme Kalis (NED)
2 October	(United States) Lake Placid	Alix André-Gallis (FRA)	Bethany-Ann Jackson (GBR)
2 October	(United States) Lake Placid	Benjamin Krüger (GER)	Rafaelle Carrier (CAN)
2 October	(United States) Lake Placid	Naël Rouffiac (FRA)	Makena Kellerman (USA)

== Downhill ==
=== Elite ===
Date	Venue	Podium (Men)	Podium (Women)
2 May	(South Korea) Mona Yongpyong	Asa Vermette (USA)	Valentina Höll (AUT)
2 May	(South Korea) Mona Yongpyong	Loïc Bruni (FRA)	Gloria Scarsi (ITA)
2 May	(South Korea) Mona Yongpyong	Amaury Pierron (FRA)	Myriam Nicole (FRA)
31 May	(France) Loudenvielle–Peyragudes	Luca Shaw (USA)	Valentina Höll (AUT)
31 May	(France) Loudenvielle–Peyragudes	Benoît Coulanges (FRA)	Gracey Hemstreet (CAN)
31 May	(France) Loudenvielle–Peyragudes	Jordan Williams (GBR)	Lisa Baumann (SUI)
13 June	(Austria) Saalfelden–Leogang	Finn Iles (CAN)	Valentina Höll (AUT)
13 June	(Austria) Saalfelden–Leogang	Amaury Pierron (FRA)	Marine Cabirou (FRA)
13 June	(Austria) Saalfelden–Leogang	Henri Kiefer (GER)	Anna Newkirk (USA)
20 June	(Switzerland) Lenzerheide	Finn Iles (CAN)	Anna Newkirk (USA)
20 June	(Switzerland) Lenzerheide	Amaury Pierron (FRA)	Lisa Baumann (SUI)
20 June	(Switzerland) Lenzerheide	Asa Vermette (USA)	Gloria Scarsi (ITA)
4 July	(Italy) La Thuile	Jordan Williams (GBR)	Valentina Höll (AUT)
4 July	(Italy) La Thuile	Asa Vermette (USA)	Lisa Baumann (SUI)
4 July	(Italy) La Thuile	Jackson Goldstone (CAN)	Sacha Earnest (NZL)
11 July	(Andorra) Pal–Arinsal	Jordan Williams (GBR)	Valentina Höll (AUT)
11 July	(Andorra) Pal–Arinsal	Reece Wilson (GBR)	Gracey Hemstreet (CAN)
11 July	(Andorra) Pal–Arinsal	Ryan Pinkerton (USA)	Sacha Earnest (NZL)
22 August	(France) Les Gets	Max Alran (FRA)	Harriet Harnden (GBR)
22 August	(France) Les Gets	Andreas Kolb (AUT)	Marine Cabirou (FRA)
22 August	(France) Les Gets	Jackson Goldstone (CAN)	Valentina Höll (AUT)
27 September	(Canada) Whistler	Asa Vermette (USA)	Valentina Höll (AUT)
27 September	(Canada) Whistler	Max Alran (FRA)	Gracey Hemstreet (CAN)
27 September	(Canada) Whistler	Amaury Pierron (FRA)	Lisa Bouladou (FRA)
4 October	(United States) Lake Placid	Luke Meier-Smith (AUS)	Lisa Bouladou (FRA)
4 October	(United States) Lake Placid	Andreas Kolb (AUT)	Valentina Höll (AUT)
4 October	(United States) Lake Placid	Lachlan Stevens-McNab (NZL)	Tahnée Seagrave (GBR)

=== Junior ===
Date	Venue	Podium (Men)	Podium (Women)
2 May	(South Korea) Mona Yongpyong	Jonty Williamson (NZL)	Aletha Ostgaard (USA)
2 May	(South Korea) Mona Yongpyong	Malik Boatwright (NZL)	Rosa Zierl (AUT)
2 May	(South Korea) Mona Yongpyong	Sacha Brizin (FRA)	Tilly Boadle (AUS)
31 May	(France) Loudenvielle–Peyragudes	Jonty Williamson (NZL)	Rosa Zierl (AUT)
31 May	(France) Loudenvielle–Peyragudes	Raoul Schneeberger (SUI)	Lina Frener (AUT)
31 May	(France) Loudenvielle–Peyragudes	Sacha Brizin (FRA)	Aletha Ostgaard (USA)
13 June	(Austria) Saalfelden–Leogang	Jonty Williamson (NZL)	Lina Frener (AUT)
13 June	(Austria) Saalfelden–Leogang	Malik Boatwright (NZL)	Aletha Ostgaard (USA)
13 June	(Austria) Saalfelden–Leogang	Kasper Hickman (FIN)	Rosa Marie Jensen (DEN)
20 June	(Switzerland) Lenzerheide	Jonty Williamson (NZL)	Lina Frener (AUT)
20 June	(Switzerland) Lenzerheide	Felix Griffiths (GBR)	Aletha Ostgaard (USA)
20 June	(Switzerland) Lenzerheide	Ažbe Kalinšek (SLO)	Rosa Marie Jensen (DEN)
4 July	(Italy) La Thuile	Kasper Hickman (FIN)	Aletha Ostgaard (USA)
4 July	(Italy) La Thuile	Malik Boatwright (NZL)	Lina Frener (AUT)
4 July	(Italy) La Thuile	Sacha Brizin (FRA)	Cassandre Peizerat (FRA)
11 July	(Andorra) Pal–Arinsal	Jonty Williamson (NZL)	Aletha Ostgaard (USA)
11 July	(Andorra) Pal–Arinsal	Kasper Hickman (FIN)	Lina Frener (AUT)
11 July	(Andorra) Pal–Arinsal	Malik Boatwright (NZL)	Rosa Marie Jensen (DEN)
22 August	(France) Les Gets	Jonty Williamson (NZL)	Aletha Ostgaard (USA)
22 August	(France) Les Gets	Malik Boatwright (NZL)	Cassandre Peizerat (FRA)
22 August	(France) Les Gets	Elliot Smith (GBR)	Rosa Marie Jensen (DEN)
27 September	(Canada) Whistler	Camden Rutherfurd (NZL)	Aletha Ostgaard (USA)
27 September	(Canada) Whistler	Lois Eller (GER)	Cassandre Peizerat (FRA)
27 September	(Canada) Whistler	Boston Bryant (USA)	Tilly Boadle (AUS)
4 October	(United States) Lake Placid	Ryder Wilson (CAN)	Tilly Boadle (AUS)
4 October	(United States) Lake Placid	Malik Boatwright (NZL)	Indy Deavoll (NZL)
4 October	(United States) Lake Placid	Noé Forlin (SUI)	Aletha Ostgaard (NOR)

== Cross-country eliminator ==
Date	Venue	Podium (Men)	Podium (Women)
14 June	(Turkey) Sakarya	Jakob Klemenčič (SLO)	Mariia Sukhopalova (UKR)
14 June	(Turkey) Sakarya	Theo Hauser (AUT)	Marion Fromberger (GER)
14 June	(Turkey) Sakarya	Máté Szakács (ROM)	Didi de Vries (NED)
27 June	(Poland) Gdynia	Matic Kranjec Žagar (SLO)	Mariia Sukhopalova (UKR)
27 June	(Poland) Gdynia	Simon Gegenheimer (GER)	Marion Fromberger (GER)
27 June	(Poland) Gdynia	Ede-Károly Molnár (ROM)	Didi de Vries (NED)
11 July	(Germany) Aalen	Jakob Klemenčič (SLO)	Gaia Tormena (ITA)
11 July	(Germany) Aalen	Theo Hauser (AUT)	Marion Fromberger (GER)
11 July	(Germany) Aalen	Jarne Vandersteen (BEL)	Mariia Sukhopalova (UKR)

== Enduro ==
In enduro races, the downhills are timed and the uphills are mandatory but not timed.

=== Elite ===
Date	Venue	Podium (Men)	Podium (Women)
30 May	(France) Loudenvielle–Peyragudes	Alex Rudeau (FRA)	Ella Conolly (GBR)
30 May	(France) Loudenvielle–Peyragudes	Raphaël Giambi (FRA)	Mélanie Pugin (FRA)
30 May	(France) Loudenvielle–Peyragudes	Ryan Gilchrist (AUS)	Raphaela Richter (GER)
14 June	(Austria) Saalfelden–Leogang	Sławomir Łukasik (POL)	Winnifred Goldsbury (NZL)
14 June	(Austria) Saalfelden–Leogang	Lief Rodgers (CAN)	Ella Conolly (GBR)
14 June	(Austria) Saalfelden–Leogang	Marius Tenet (FRA)	Mélanie Pugin (FRA)
27–28 June	(Italy) Val di Fassa	Tristan Botteram (NED)	Mélanie Pugin (FRA)
27–28 June	(Italy) Val di Fassa	Tommaso Calonaci (ITA)	Ella Conolly (GBR)
27–28 June	(Italy) Val di Fassa	Tommaso Francardo (ITA)	Winnifred Goldsbury (NZL)
4 July	(Italy) La Thuile	Raphaël Giambi (FRA)	Ella Conolly (GBR)
4 July	(Italy) La Thuile	Adrien Dailly (FRA)	Mélanie Pugin (FRA)
4 July	(Italy) La Thuile	Alex Rudeau (FRA)	Raphaela Richter (GER)
18–19 July	(Switzerland) Aletsch Arena–Bellwald	Ryan Gilchrist (AUS)	Ella Conolly (GBR)
18–19 July	(Switzerland) Aletsch Arena–Bellwald	Lief Rodgers (CAN)	Elly Hoskin (CAN)
18–19 July	(Switzerland) Aletsch Arena–Bellwald	Adrien Dailly (FRA)	Nadine Ellecosta (ITA)
15–16 August	(France) Morillon	Adrien Dailly (FRA)	Morgane Charre (FRA)
15–16 August	(France) Morillon	Tarmo Ryynänen (FIN)	Nadine Ellecosta (ITA)
15–16 August	(France) Morillon	Gabriel Sainthuile (BEL)	Helen Weber (GER)

=== Junior ===
Date	Venue	Podium (Men)	Podium (Women)
30 May	(France) Loudenvielle–Peyragudes	Hugo Marti (FRA)	Romy Williams (USA)
30 May	(France) Loudenvielle–Peyragudes	Harper Nelmes (AUS)	Bélinda Baudet (FRA)
30 May	(France) Loudenvielle–Peyragudes	Jules Janniaud (FRA)	Keely Bathurst (CAN)
14 June	(Austria) Saalfelden–Leogang	Hugo Marti (FRA)	Nežka Libnik (SLO)
14 June	(Austria) Saalfelden–Leogang	Quirin Bach (GER)	Ella Mårtensson (SWE)
14 June	(Austria) Saalfelden–Leogang	Šimon Lehký (CZE)	Malin Emily Hoyle (SUI)
27–28 June	(Italy) Val di Fassa	Harper Nelmes (AUS)	Nežka Libnik (SLO)
27–28 June	(Italy) Val di Fassa	Hugo Marti (FRA)	Elena Frei (SUI)
27–28 June	(Italy) Val di Fassa	Lorenzo Cesari (ITA)	Romy Williams (USA)
4 July	(Italy) La Thuile	Hugo Marti (FRA)	Nežka Libnik (SLO)
4 July	(Italy) La Thuile	Jules Janniaud (FRA)	Bélinda Baudet (FRA)
4 July	(Italy) La Thuile	Tommy Bougon (FRA)	Romy Williams (USA)
18–19 July	(Switzerland) Aletsch Arena–Bellwald	Hugo Marti (FRA)	Elena Frei (SUI)
18–19 July	(Switzerland) Aletsch Arena–Bellwald	Nico Schroder (NZL)	Romy Williams (USA)
18–19 July	(Switzerland) Aletsch Arena–Bellwald	Jules Janniaud (FRA)	Nežka Libnik (SLO)
15–16 August	(France) Morillon	Hugo Marti (FRA)	Nežka Libnik (SLO)
15–16 August	(France) Morillon	Jules Janniaud (FRA)	Romy Williams (USA)
15–16 August	(France) Morillon	Lorenzo Cesari (ITA)	Julia Gay (FRA)

== Marathon ==
Date	Venue	Podium (Men)	Podium (Women)
21 February	(Spain) Calpe–Benissa	Wout Alleman (BEL)	Anna Weinbeer (SUI)
21 February	(Spain) Calpe–Benissa	Andreas Seewald (GER)	Natalia Fischer (ESP)
21 February	(Spain) Calpe–Benissa	David Valero (ESP)	Rosa van Doorn (NED)
9 May	(Italy) Capoliveri	Jakob Dorigoni (ITA)	Anna Weinbeer (SUI)
9 May	(Italy) Capoliveri	Stefano Goria (ITA)	Natalia Fischer (ESP)
9 May	(Italy) Capoliveri	Gioele De Cosmo (ITA)	Lejla Njemčević (BIH)
31 May	Andorra	David Valero (ESP)	Anna Weinbeer (SUI)
31 May	Andorra	Héctor Páez (COL)	Natalia Fischer (ESP)
31 May	Andorra	Gerardo Ulloa (MEX)	Claudia Peretti (ITA)
13 June	(Italy) Selva Val Gardena	David Valero (ESP)	Claudia Peretti (ITA)
13 June	(Italy) Selva Val Gardena	Diego Rosa (ITA)	Rosa van Doorn (NED)
13 June	(Italy) Selva Val Gardena	Tim Smeenge (NED)	Paula Gorycka (POL)
26 July	(Germany) Kirchzarten	Wout Alleman (BEL)	Anna Weinbeer (SUI)
26 July	(Germany) Kirchzarten	David Valero (ESP)	Natalia Fischer (ESP)
26 July	(Germany) Kirchzarten	Davide Foccoli (ITA)	Claudia Peretti (ITA)
20 September	(Spain) Girona/Costa Brava	David Valero (ESP)	Anna Weinbeer (SUI)
20 September	(Spain) Girona/Costa Brava	Andreas Seewald (GER)	Claudia Peretti (ITA)
20 September	(Spain) Girona/Costa Brava	Eskil Evensen-Lie (NOR)	Natalia Fischer (ESP)

== World Cup standings ==
bold denotes race winners.

=== Cross-country ===
==== Men's ====
**Top 5 men's elite standings**
Rank	Rider	KOR (South Korea)	CZE (Czech Republic)	AUT (Austria)	SUI (Switzerland)	ITA (Italy)	AND (Andorra)	FRA (France)	USA (United States)	USA (United States)	Total Points
1	(France) **Luca Martin**	200	237	250	**315**	**315**	102	215	185	180	**1999**
2	(France) Adrien Boichis	DNS	166	**288**	280	240	**315**	**330**	DNS	DNS	**1619**
3	(Chile) Martín Vidaurre	98	190	99	190	0	145	193	**250**	240	**1405**
4	(Italy) Simone Avondetto	135	6	186	177	164	177	178	103	155	**1281**
5	(United States) Bjorn Riley	90	94	189	210	190	210	100	144	36	**1263**

**Top 5 men's under 23 standings**
Rank	Rider	KOR (South Korea)	CZE (Czech Republic)	AUT (Austria)	SUI (Switzerland)	ITA (Italy)	AND (Andorra)	FRA (France)	USA (United States)	USA (United States)	Total Points
1	(Germany) **Paul Schehl**	125	40	**165**	**165**	**165**	**165**	110	84	47	**1066**
2	(Spain) Thibaut François	120	**142**	100	125	105	130	60	48	70	**900**
3	(Switzerland) Nicolas Halter	**145**	75	93	67	125	105	82	91	72	**855**
4	(Denmark) Gustav Heby Pedersen	73	DNS	58	84	90	94	**165**	80	80	**724**
5	(Germany) Benjamin Krüger	65	39	50	60	50	41	125	**140**	130	**700**

==== Women's ====
**Top 5 women's elite standings**
Rank	Rider	KOR (South Korea)	CZE (Czech Republic)	AUT (Austria)	SUI (Switzerland)	ITA (Italy)	AND (Andorra)	FRA (France)	USA (United States)	USA (United States)	Total Points
1	(Sweden) **Jenny Rissveds**	238	235	**315**	**284**	230	**330**	265	148	155	**2200**
2	(Switzerland) Sina Frei	**330**	198	180	187	195	195	**330**	210	**300**	**2125**
3	(Italy) Martina Berta	190	119	159	155	**287**	234	156	**330**	280	**1910**
4	(United States) Savilia Blunk	107	158	177	240	250	187	210	182	145	**1656**
5	(Austria) Laura Stigger	170	**315**	76	176	192	205	133	128	153	**1548**

**Top 5 women's under 23 standings**
Rank	Rider	KOR (South Korea)	CZE (Czech Republic)	AUT (Austria)	SUI (Switzerland)	ITA (Italy)	AND (Andorra)	FRA (France)	USA (United States)	USA (United States)	Total Points
1	(Italy) **Valentina Corvi**	**155**	105	**139**	**155**	**165**	**165**	**165**	**144**	0	**1193**
2	(Switzerland) Fiona Schibler	85	76	100	85	35	87	59	89	136	**760**
3	(Norway) Lisa Kristine Jorde	57	90	13	117	94	72	60	85	118	**726**
4	(Switzerland) Monique Halter	DNS	56	120	85	125	68	105	71	78	**712**
5	(Canada) Rafaelle Carrier	65	45	65	77	53	65	79	140	105	**694**

=== Cross-country short track ===
==== Elite ====
**Top 5 men's elite standings**
Rank	Rider	KOR (South Korea)	CZE (Czech Republic)	AUT (Austria)	SUI (Switzerland)	ITA (Italy)	AND (Andorra)	FRA (France)	USA (United States)	USA (United States)	Total Points
1	(France) **Luca Martin**	0	130	160	200	200	150	200	200	150	**1390**
2	(France) Adrien Boichis	DNS	120	140	**250**	**250**	200	**250**	DNS	DNS	**1210**
3	(France) Mathis Azzaro	**250**	**250**	95	110	110	29	150	150	DNS	**1144**
4	(United States) Bjorn Riley	0	100	78	160	150	**250**	100	48	120	**1006**
5	(Italy) Simone Avondetto	200	32	120	130	100	130	140	78	70	**1000**

**Top 5 elite standings**
Rank	Rider	KOR (South Korea)	CZE (Czech Republic)	AUT (Austria)	SUI (Switzerland)	ITA (Italy)	AND (Andorra)	FRA (France)	USA (United States)	USA (United States)	Total Points
1	(Switzerland) **Sina Frei**	**250**	140	**250**	130	200	110	**250**	160	160	**1650**
2	(Sweden) Jenny Rissveds	140	110	200	100	**250**	**250**	200	140	200	**1590**
3	(Italy) Martina Berta	160	100	78	70	130	100	120	**250**	**250**	**1258**
4	(United States) Savilia Blunk	74	76	130	**250**	160	130	160	90	110	**1180**
5	(Austria) Laura Stigger	150	200	68	120	90	200	140	95	95	**1158**

==== Under 23 ====
**Top 5 men's under 23 standings**
Rank	Rider	KOR (South Korea)	CZE (Czech Republic)	AUT (Austria)	SUI (Switzerland)	ITA (Italy)	AND (Andorra)	FRA (France)	USA (United States)	USA (United States)	Total Points
1	(Germany) **Paul Schehl**	80	**125**	**125**	**125**	**125**	**125**	100	70	70	**945**
2	(Spain) Thibaut François	**125**	60	100	80	100	100	52	51	65	**733**
3	(Switzerland) Nicolas Halter	75	75	65	65	80	80	60	**125**	60	**685**
4	(Denmark) Gustav Heby Pedersen	100	DNS	55	51	75	70	**125**	80	52	**608**
5	(France) Naël Rouffiac	DNS	100	60	100	60	DNS	38	65	80	**503**

**Top 5 women's under 23 standings**
Rank	Rider	KOR (South Korea)	CZE (Czech Republic)	AUT (Austria)	SUI (Switzerland)	ITA (Italy)	AND (Andorra)	FRA (France)	USA (United States)	USA (United States)	Total Points
1	(Italy) **Valentina Corvi**	100	80	51	100	**125**	**125**	**125**	70	0	**776**
2	(Canada) Rafaelle Carrier	51	46	65	80	50	80	70	**125**	100	**667**
3	(United States) Makena Kellerman	**125**	**125**	47	70	35	DNS	65	100	80	**647**
4	(Netherlands) Bloeme Kalis	DNS	65	100	**125**	100	70	32	80	75	**647**
5	(Norway) Lisa Kristine Jorde	49	100	50	60	70	100	75	75	65	**644**

=== Downhill ===
==== Men's ====
**Top 5 men's elite standings**
Rank	Rider	POL (South Korea)	FRA (France)	AUT (Austria)	SUI (Switzerland)	ITA (Italy)	AND (Andorra)	FRA (France)	CAN (Canada)	USA (United States)	Total Points
1	(United States) **Asa Vermette**	**300**	0	45	180	232	165	125	**300**	95	**1442**
2	(United Kingdom) Jordan Williams	50	230	66	135	**300**	**272**	135	63	125	**1376**
3	(France) Amaury Pierron	220	90	210	210	122	56	60	205	0	**1173**
4	(Canada) Finn Iles	45	182	**250**	**280**	58	170	DNS	0	140	**1125**
5	(France) Max Alran	80	107	140	0	65	83	**300**	250	58	**1083**

**Top 5 men's junior standings**
Rank	Rider	POL (South Korea)	FRA (France)	AUT (Austria)	SUI (Switzerland)	ITA (Italy)	AND (Andorra)	FRA (France)	CAN (Canada)	USA (United States)	Total Points
1	(New Zealand) **Jonty Williamson**	**60**	**60**	**60**	**60**	9	**60**	**60**	DNS	DNS	**369**
2	(New Zealand) Malik Boatwright	50	DNS	50	0	50	45	50	10	50	**305**
3	(New Zealand) Camden Rutherfurd	40	DNS	DNS	40	8	24	30	**60**	35	**237**
4	(France) Sacha Brizin	45	45	DNS	28	45	35	26	DNS	DNS	**224**
5	(Switzerland) Raoul Schneeberger	24	50	35	8	40	28	DNS	DNS	30	**215**

==== Women's ====
**Top 5 women's elite standings**
Rank	Rider	POL (South Korea)	FRA (France)	AUT (Austria)	SUI (Switzerland)	ITA (Italy)	AND (Andorra)	FRA (France)	CAN (Canada)	USA (United States)	Total Points
1	(Austria) **Valentina Höll**	**266**	**300**	**280**	64	**300**	**300**	230	**270**	210	**2220**
2	(United Kingdom) Harriet Harnden	200	90	100	120	70	70	**280**	115	90	**1135**
3	(Canada) Gracey Hemstreet	80	240	90	0	115	235	40	240	80	**1120**
4	(Italy) Gloria Scarsi	240	DNS	164	185	90	80	162	132	48	**1101**
5	(Switzerland) Lisa Baumann	70	190	50	222	250	60	100	49	70	**1061**

**Top 5 women's junior standings**
Rank	Rider	POL (South Korea)	FRA (France)	AUT (Austria)	SUI (Switzerland)	ITA (Italy)	AND (Andorra)	FRA (France)	CAN (Canada)	USA (United States)	Total Points
1	(United States) **Aletha Ostgaard**	**60**	45	50	50	**60**	**60**	**60**	**60**	45	**490**
2	(Austria) Lina Frener	30	50	**60**	**60**	50	50	DNS	5	DNS	**315**
3	(Denmark) Rosa Marie Jensen	35	40	45	45	40	45	45	DNS	DNS	**295**
4	(New Zealand) Indy Deavoll	25	35	DNS	40	25	40	15	DNS	50	**230**
5	(Australia) Tilly Boadle	45	DNS	DNS	DNS	DNS	35	30	45	**60**	**215**

=== Cross-country eliminator ===
**Top 5 men's elite standings**
Rank	Rider	TUR (Turkey)	POL (Poland)	GER (Germany)	Total Points
1	(Slovenia) **Jakob Klemenčič**	**100**	55	**90**	**245**
1	(Slovenia) Matic Kranjec Žagar	65	**100**	50	**215**
3	(Austria) Theo Hauser	78	33	**90**	**201**
4	(Sweden) Edvin Lindh	0	60	48	**108**
5	(Germany) Simon Gegenheimer	DNS	75	33	**108**

**Top 5 women's elite standings**
Rank	Rider	TUR (Turkey)	POL (Poland)	GER (Germany)	Total Points
1	(Ukraine) **Mariia Sukhopalova**	**100**	**95**	75	**270**
2	(Germany) Marion Fromberger	85	80	80	**245**
3	(Netherlands) Didi de Vries	70	68	47	**185**
4	(France) Madison Boissière	48	70	36	**154**
5	(Czech Republic) Adéla Pernická	53	DNS	58	**111**

=== Enduro ===
==== Elite ====
**Top 5 EDR men's elite standings**
Rank	Rider	FRA (France)	AUT (Austria)	ITA (Italy)	ITA (Italy)	SUI (Switzerland)	FRA (France)	Total Points
1	(France) **Adrien Dailly**	140	140	68	210	180	**250**	**988**
2	(Canada) Lief Rodgers	80	210	160	160	210	125	**945**
3	(Australia) Ryan Gilchrist	180	110	63	54	**250**	95	**752**
4	(France) Marius Tenet	95	180	95	125	75	160	**730**
5	(France) Raphaël Giambi	210	56	75	**250**	110	DNS	**701**

**Top 5 EDR women's elite standings**
Rank	Rider	FRA (France)	AUT (Austria)	ITA (Italy)	ITA (Italy)	SUI (Switzerland)	FRA (France)	Total Points
1	(United Kingdom) **Ella Conolly**	**250**	210	210	**250**	**250**	120	**1290**
2	(France) Mélanie Pugin	210	180	**250**	210	150	70	**1070**
3	(Canada) Elly Hoskin	70	120	150	150	210	90	**790**
4	(Germany) Raphaela Richter	180	150	120	180	DNS	150	**780**
5	(Italy) Nadine Ellecosta	120	80	90	50	180	210	**730**

==== Junior ====
**Top 5 EDR men's junior standings**
Rank	Rider	FRA (France)	AUT (Austria)	ITA (Italy)	ITA (Italy)	SUI (Switzerland)	FRA (France)	Total Points
1	(France) **Hugo Marti**	**60**	**60**	50	**60**	**60**	**60**	**350**
2	(France) Jules Janniaud	45	DNS	30	50	45	50	**220**
3	(Italy) Lorenzo Cesari	26	28	45	26	26	45	**196**
4	(France) Tommy Bougon	30	35	40	45	DNS	DNS	**150**
5	(Australia) Harper Nelmes	50	DNS	**60**	35	DNS	DNS	**145**

**Top 5 EDR women's junior standings**
Rank	Rider	FRA (France)	AUT (Austria)	ITA (Italy)	ITA (Italy)	SUI (Switzerland)	FRA (France)	Total Points
1	(Slovenia) **Nežka Libnik**	DNS	**60**	**60**	**60**	45	**60**	**285**
2	(United States) Romy Williams	**60**	DNS	45	45	50	50	**250**
3	(Italy) Alice Farinelli	DNS	40	25	DNS	40	35	**140**
4	(France) Bélinda Baudet	50	DNS	15	50	DNS	DNS	**115**
5	(Switzerland) Elena Frei	DNS	DNS	50	DNS	**60**	DNS	**110**

=== Marathon ===
**Top 5 men's elite standings**
Rank	Rider	ESP (Spain)	ITA (Italy)	AND (Andorra)	ITA (Italy)	GER (Germany)	ESP (Spain)	Total Points
1	(Spain) **David Valero**	160	80	**250**	**250**	200	**250**	**1190**
2	(Belgium) Wout Alleman	**250**	150	85	130	**250**	140	**1005**
3	(Colombia) Héctor Páez	76	120	200	150	150	74	**770**
4	(Italy) Samuele Porro	85	80	120	110	140	150	**685**
5	(Germany) Andreas Seewald	200	52	DNS	120	100	200	**672**

**Top 5 women's elite standings**
Rank	Rider	ESP (Spain)	ITA (Italy)	AND (Andorra)	ITA (Italy)	GER (Germany)	ESP (Spain)	Total Points
1	(Switzerland) **Anna Weinbeer**	**250**	**250**	**250**	150	**250**	**250**	**1400**
2	(Spain) Natalia Fischer	200	200	200	95	200	160	**1055**
3	(Italy) Claudia Peretti	100	110	160	**250**	160	200	**980**
4	(Poland) Paula Gorycka	150	150	150	160	110	150	**870**
5	(Sweden) Amanda Bohlin	74	140	120	120	130	130	**714**

== See also ==
- 2026 UCI Cycling World Championships
