= Charlie Aldridge =

British cyclist

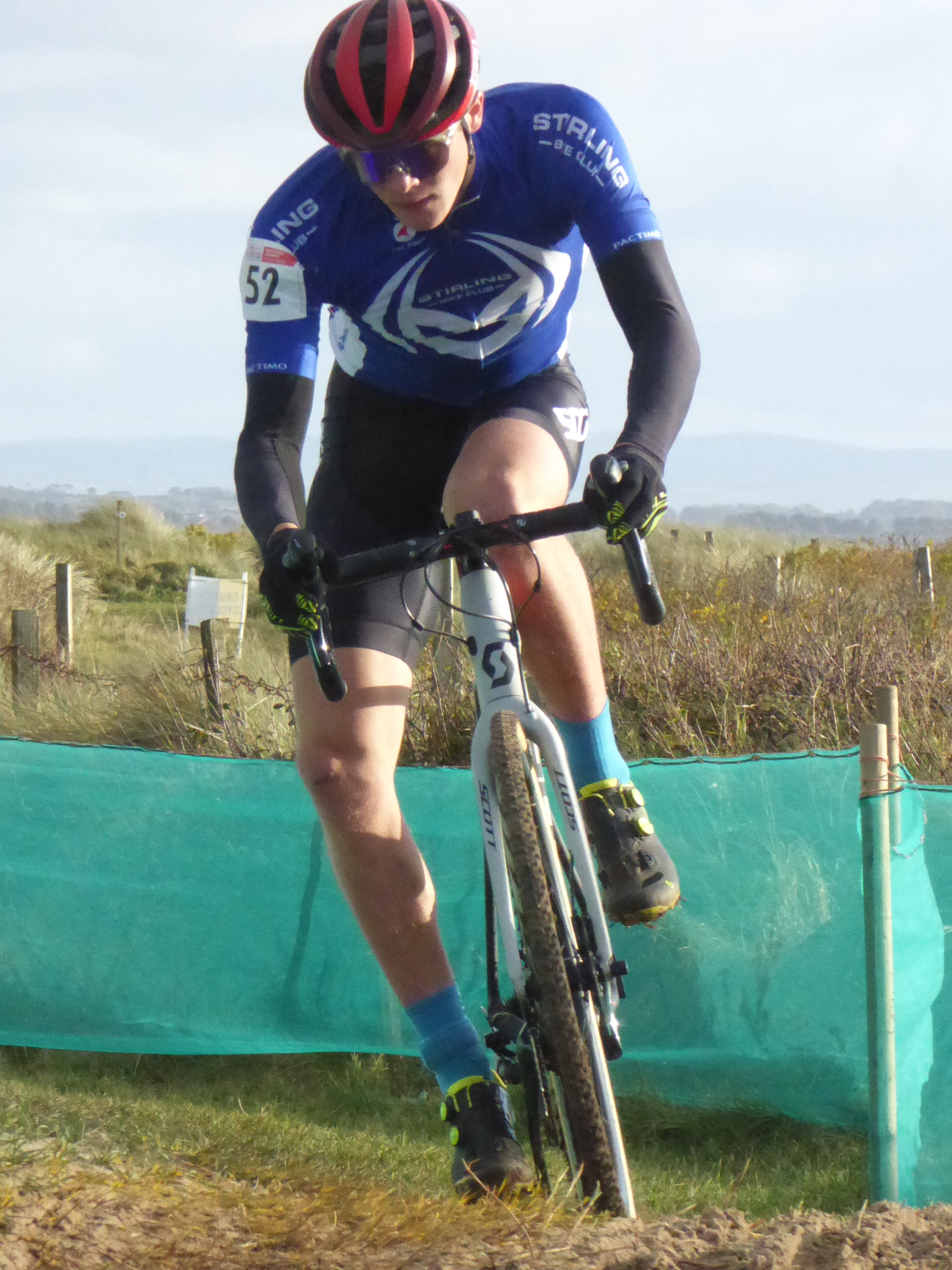
- Aldridge in 2019

Personal information
- Born: 3 April 2001 (age 25) Perth, Scotland

Cycling career
- Sport: Cycling
- Discipline: Cross-country
- Role: Rider

Major wins
- Mountain bike European XC Championships (2026) National XC Championships (2023, 2025, 2026) XC World Cup 2 individual wins (2025, 2026)
Medal record
Representing Great Britain
Men's mountain bike racing
World Championships
Silver medal – second place	2026 Val di Sole	Cross-country
Silver medal – second place	2026 Val di Sole	Short track
Silver medal – second place	2024 Vallnord	Short track
Gold medal – first place	2023 Glasgow	Under-23 cross-country
Gold medal – first place	2019 Mont-Sainte-Anne	Junior cross-country
European Championships
Gold medal – first place	2026 Monticeneri	Cross-country
Gold medal – first place	2026 Monticeneri	Short track
Gold medal – first place	2022 Anadia	Short track
Silver medal – second place	2025 Melgaço	Cross-country

Charlie Aldridge (born 3 April 2001) is a British mountain bike cross country cyclist from Scotland. He was the 2019 Junior World Champion, 2022 British national champion, 2023 U23 World Champion and 2026 European Champion.

== Personal life ==
Aldridge was born in Perth, Scotland and lives in Crieff. He was a student of mechanical engineering at the University of Edinburgh.

== Career ==
Aldridge won gold at the 2019 UCI Mountain Bike World Championships held in Mont-Sainte-Anne, Canada in the junior cross country competition. At that championships he was also part of the relay team that finished sixth overall.

In May, 2022 he won the British National Mountain Biking Championships u23 title at Cannock Chase. It was raced on the same course that would be used for the 2022 Commonwealth Games where Aldridge was chosen to compete for Scotland. The familiarity of this gave him confidence to strive for a medal. However, at the Games Aldridge was looking on course for a bronze medal on the penultimate lap when he had a mechanical issue following a crash. His bike lost its rear derailleur and he ended up finishing sixteenth.

In June, 2022 he won the European Continental Championships XCO U23 race in Anadia, Portugal. In July, 2022 he won bronze at the 2022 UCI Mountain Bike World Cup u23 event in Lenzerheide, Switzerland. He was named in the Britain squad for the UCI Mountain Bike World Championships in Les Gets, France in August 2022.

In June 2024, he was selected for the British team to compete in the Mountain Biking at the 2024 Paris Olympics.

In July 2025, he was runner-up to compatriot Tom Pidcock at the European Mountain Bike Championships in Portugal. The following year, he won both the 'Olympic cross-country' and the short track title at the 2026 European Mountain Bike Championships. On 27 August, he won the silver medal at the UCI Mountain Bike World Championships in the short track discipline, before later in the week also winning the silver medal behind Pidcock in a British one-two finish at the Olympic cross-country distance.

== Major results ==
2018
Junior National XC Series

1st Dalby Forest
1st Kentford
2nd Builth Wells

2nd Cross-country, National Junior Championships
2019
1st Cross-country, UCI World Junior Championships
Junior Swiss Bike Cup

1st Andermatt

1st Overall Junior National XC Series

1st Sherwood Pines
1st Hadleigh Park
1st Cannock Chase

2021
2nd Cross-country, National Under-23 Championships
2022
UEC European Championships

1st Short track
2nd Under-23 Cross-country

National Championships

1st Short track
1st Under-23 Cross-country

1st Overall National XC Series

1st Tong
1st Cannock Chase
2nd Newcastleton
2nd Fowey

UCI Under-23 XCO World Cup

3rd Lenzerheide

3rd Jelenia Góra
2023
1st Cross-country, UCI World Under-23 Championships
National Championships

1st Cross-country
1st Short track

National XCO Series

1st Winchester
1st Fowey

3rd Cross-country, UEC European Under-23 Championships
Greek Series

3rd Salamis

2024
National XCO Series

1st Cannock Chase

UCI World Championships

2nd Short track
4th Cross-country

UCI XCC World Cup

2nd Les Gets

2nd Haiming
Internazionali D’Italia Series

3rd Esanatoglia

UCI XCO World Cup

4th Nové Město
4th Mont-Sainte-Anne

2025
National Championships

1st Cross-country
1st Short track

UCI XCO World Cup

1st Mont-Sainte-Anne
2nd Lenzerheide
3rd Pal–Arinsal
5th Val di Sole

3rd Overall UCI XCC World Cup

1st Les Gets
2nd Mont-Sainte-Anne
3rd Leogang

National XCO Series

1st Glentress Forest

1st Chelva
2nd Cross-country, UEC European Championships
2nd Overall Mediterranean Epic
Shimano Super Cup

2nd Banyoles

Swiss Bike Cup

3rd Rivera

2026
UEC European Championships

1st Cross-country
1st Short track

National Championships

1st Cross-country
1st Short track

UCI XCO World Cup

1st Lake Placid
3rd Mona Yongpyong

UCI World Championships

2nd Cross-country
2nd Short track

UCI XCC World Cup

3rd La Thuile
3rd Soldier Hollow

=== UCI World Cup results ===
Season	1	2	3	4	5	6	7	8	9	10	Rank	Points
2023	NOV; 58	LEN; 14	LEO; 26	VAL; DNF	AND; 33	LES; 15	SNO; 30	MON; 7			21	602
2024	MAI; 45	ARA; 13	NOV; 4	VAL; 48	CRA; 16	LES; 18	LAK; 31	MON; 4			15	819
2025	ARA; DNF	ARA; 53	NOV; 40	LEO; 44	VAL; 5	AND; 3	LES; 33	LEN; 2	LAK; 9	MON; 1	5	1367
2026	KOR; 3	NOV; 11	LEO; 35	LEN; 21	THU; 8	AND; 24	LES; 14	SLC; 34	LAK; 1		6	1175
