= Adrien Boichis =

French cyclist (born 2003)

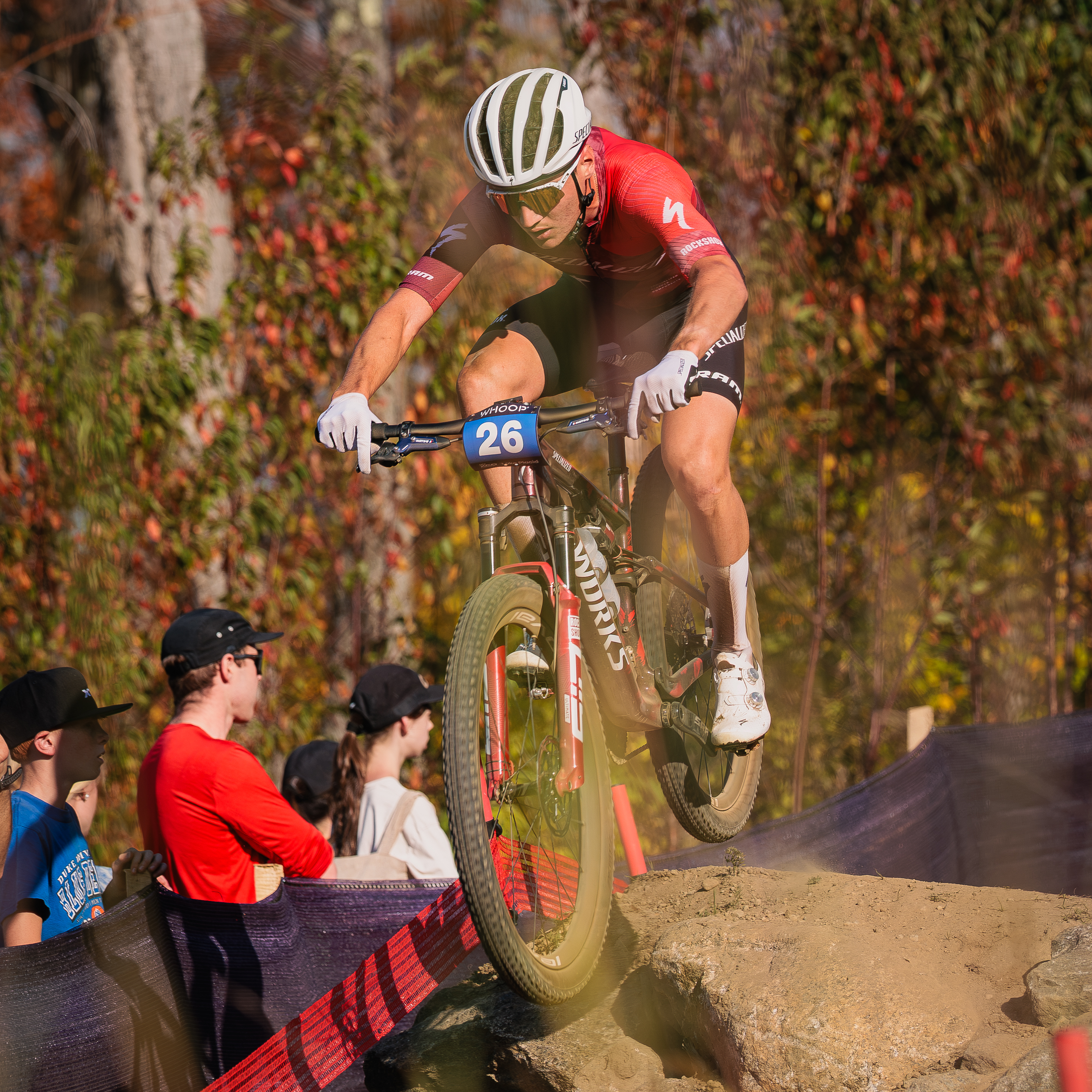

Personal information
- Born: 2 January 2003 (age 23) Aix-en-Provence, France
- Weight: 68 kg (150 lb)

Cycling career
- Sport: Cycling
- Current team: Red Bull–Bora–Hansgrohe; Specialized Factory Racing
- Disciplines: Road; Mountain bike
- Role: Rider

Professional teams
- 2022–2024: Trinity Racing
- 2025–: Specialized Factory Racing (MTB)
- 2025: Red Bull–Bora–Hansgrohe Rookies (road)
- 2026–: Red Bull–Bora–Hansgrohe (road)

Major wins
- Mountain bike XC World Cup 3 individual wins (2026)
Medal record
Representing France
World Championships
Gold medal – first place	2021 Val di Sole	Junior cross-country
Gold medal – first place	2021 Val di Sole	Team relay
Silver medal – second place	2023 Glasgow	Team relay
Silver medal – second place	2023 Glasgow	Under-23 cross-country
European Championships
Gold medal – first place	2023 Cracovie	Under-23 cross-country
Silver medal – second place	2023 Cracovie	Short track cross-country
Silver medal – second place	2023 Cracovie	Team relay

Adrien Boichis (born 2 January 2003) is a French road cyclist and cross-country mountain biker. He currently rides for UCI WorldTeam Red Bull–Bora–Hansgrohe for road races and Specialized Factory Racing for mountain biking. He won the junior cross-country race at the 2021 UCI Mountain Bike World Championships.

== Major results ==
=== Mountain bike ===
2021
UCI World Championships

1st Team relay
1st Junior cross-country

1st Cross-country, National Junior Championships
2023
1st Overall UCI Under-23 XCO World Cup

1st Nové Město
1st Leogang
1st Les Gets
2nd Val di Sole
2nd Pal–Arinsal
2nd Snowshoe
2nd Mont-Sainte-Anne
3rd Lenzerheide

1st Overall UCI Under-23 XCC World Cup

1st Leogang
1st Pal–Arinsal
1st Les Gets
1st Mont-Sainte-Anne
2nd Lenzerheide
3rd Val di Sole

UEC European Championships

1st Under-23 cross-country
2nd Team relay
2nd Short track

1st Cross-country, National Under-23 Championships
UCI World Championships

2nd Team relay
2nd Under-23 cross-country

2025
UCI World Championships

1st Team relay
1st Under-23 short track

UEC European Championships

1st Under-23 cross-country
3rd Short track

1st Cross-country, National Under-23 Championships
UCI XCO World Cup

2nd Lake Placid
3rd Araxá
3rd Lenzerheide
4th Mont-Sainte-Anne

UCI XCC World Cup

2nd Lenzerheide
2nd Lake Placid
3rd Mont-Sainte-Anne

2026
UCI World Championships

1st Short track
5th Cross-country

UCI XCO World Cup

1st Leogang
1st Pal–Arinsal
1st Les Gets
3rd La Thuile

UCI XCC World Cup

1st Lenzerheide
1st La Thuile
1st Les Gets
2nd Pal–Arinsal

=== Road ===
2025
1st Overall Istrian Spring Tour
2nd Road race, National Under-23 Championships
2026
4th Trofeo Calvià
7th Overall Tour de Wallonie
5th Overall CRO Race
