= Jenny Rissveds =

Swedish cross-country mountainbike rider (born 1994)

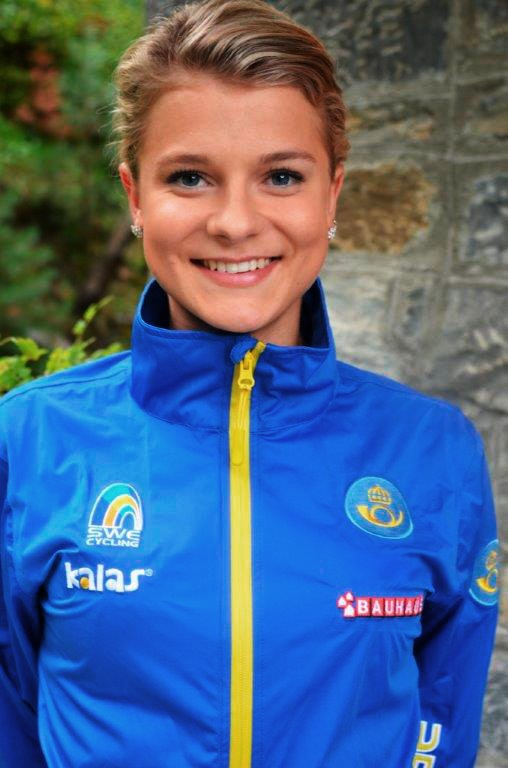
- Rissveds in 2016

Personal information
- Full name: Jenny Rissveds
- Born: 6 June 1994 (age 32) Falun, Sweden
- Height: 1.64 m (5 ft 5 in)
- Weight: 55 kg (121 lb)

Cycling career
- Sport: Cycling
- Current team: CANYON CLLCTV
- Discipline: Mountain bike racing
- Role: Rider
- Rider type: Cross-country

Major wins
- Cyclo-cross National Championships (2016, 2017) Mountain bike Olympic Games XC (2016) World XC Championships (2025) European XC Championships (2025) National XC Championships (2013–2016, 2019–2022, 2024) XC World Cup 10 individual wins (2016, 2019, 2024, 2025, 2026) Road One-day races and Classics National Road Race Championships (2022) National Time Trial Championships (2023)
Medal record
Women's mountain bike racing
Representing Sweden
Olympic Games
| Gold medal – first place | 2016 Rio de Janeiro | Cross-country |
| Bronze medal – third place | 2024 Paris | Cross-country |
World Championships
| Gold medal – first place | 2025 Valais | Cross-country |
| Silver medal – second place | 2025 Valais | Short track |
| Bronze medal – third place | 2024 Vallnord | Short track |
European Championships
| Gold medal – first place | 2025 Melgaço | Cross-country |
| Gold medal – first place | 2025 Melgaço | Short track |
| Gold medal – first place | 2013 Bern | Eliminator |
World Under-23 Championships
| Gold medal – first place | 2016 Nové Město | Cross-country |
| Bronze medal – third place | 2015 Vallnord | Cross-country |
European Under-23 Championships
| Silver medal – second place | 2013 Bern | Cross-country |
| Silver medal – second place | 2016 Huskvarna | Cross-country |
European Junior Championships
| Gold medal – first place | 2012 Moscow | Cross-country |

Jenny Rissveds (born 6 June 1994) is a Swedish cross-country mountainbike rider. She won the gold medal in women's cross country at the 2016 Summer Olympics in Rio de Janeiro.

== Career ==
Rissveds won the gold medal in the under-23 mountainbike race at the World Championships in 2016.

In March 2017, Rissveds rode the eight-day Absa Cape Epic stage race in South Africa for the first time. Together with manager Thomas Frischknecht they won the Mixed category comfortably after covering the 641 km route.

After suffering from mental health issues, Jenny took an hiatus from competing most of the 2017 and the 2018 season.

In July 2017, she was awarded the Victoria Scholarship.

On 11 August 2019, she won her first world cup victory post-her 2016 Summer Olympics gold medal, when winning a World Cup competition in Lenzerheide in Switzerland.

Rissveds won her second olympic medal, a bronze, at the 2024 Summer Olympics.

== Major results ==
=== Cyclo-cross ===
2015–2016
1st National Championships
1st Stockholm
2016–2017
1st National Championships

=== Road ===
2010
6th Overall U6 Cycle Tour

1st Stage 5 (ITT)

2022
1st Road race, National Championships
2nd Overall Gracia Orlová

1st Stage 2

2023
National Championships

1st Time trial
5th Road race

1st Overall Gracia Orlová

1st Stage 3 (ITT)

4th Overall Baloise Ladies Tour

=== Mountain bike ===
2012
1st Cross-country, UEC European Junior Championships
2013
1st National Championships

1st Cross-country
1st Downhill
1st Eliminator

2nd Cross-country, UEC European Under-23 Championships
2014
1st National Championships

1st Cross-country
1st Eliminator

2015
1st National Championships

1st Cross-country
1st Eliminator

3rd Cross-country, UCI World Under-23 Championships
2016
1st Cross-country, Olympic Games
1st Cross-country, UCI World Under-23 Championships
1st Cross-country, National Championships
UCI XCO World Cup

1st Lenzerheide
2nd Albstadt
4th Vallnord

Internazionali d'Italia Series

1st Milan

2nd Cross-country, UEC European Under-23 Championships
2017
1st Overall Mixed Cape Epic (with Thomas Frischknecht)
Swiss Bike Cup

1st Rivera

2019
1st Cross-country, National Championships
UCI XCO World Cup

1st Lenzerheide
3rd Val di Sole
5th Vallnord

UCI XCC World Cup

1st Snowshoe
3rd Lenzerheide

2020
1st Cross-country, National Championships
2021
National Championships

1st Cross-country
1st Eliminator

UCI XCC World Cup

1st Lenzerheide
3rd Nové Město
3rd Les Gets
3rd Snowshoe

3rd Overall UCI XCO World Cup

2nd Leogang
2nd Les Gets
3rd Lenzerheide

2022
National Championships

1st Cross-country
1st Short track

Internazionali d'Italia Series

1st Capoliveri

UCI XCC World Cup

1st Lenzerheide
3rd Albstadt
3rd Nové Město
3rd Snowshoe

UCI XCO World Cup

2nd Albstadt
2nd Leogang
2nd Lenzerheide
2nd Snowshoe
3rd Nové Město

2023
UCI XCC World Cup

1st Lenzerheide

UCI XCO World Cup

2nd Mont-Sainte-Anne
4th Leogang

2024
1st Cross-country, National Championships
UCI XCO World Cup

1st Mairiporã
2nd Araxá
4th Les Gets

UCI XCC World Cup

2nd Lake Placid

3rd Cross-country, Olympic Games
3rd Short track, UCI World Championships
2025
UCI World Championships

1st Cross-country
2nd Short track

UEC European Championships

1st Cross-country
1st Short track

2nd Overall UCI XCO World Cup

1st Araxá II
1st Les Gets
1st Lake Placid
1st Mont-Sainte-Anne
2nd Lenzerheide
3rd Pal–Arinsal
4th Val di Sole

2nd Overall UCI XCC World Cup

1st Les Gets
1st Lenzerheide
1st Lake Placid
1st Mont-Sainte-Anne
2nd Val di Sole
3rd Araxá II

2026
UCI XCO World Cup

1st Lenzerheide
1st Leogang
1st Pal–Arinsal
2nd Mona Yongpyong
2nd Nové Město
4th La Thuile

UCI XCC World Cup

1st La Thuile
1st Pal–Arinsal
2nd Leogang
