= Bjorn Riley =

US mountain biker (born 2002)

Personal information
- Born: February 21, 2002 (age 24) Boulder, Colorado
- Height: 1.78 m (5 ft 10 in)
- Weight: 65 kg (143 lb)

Cycling career
- Sport: Cycling
- Current team: Scott–SRAM Racing
- Discipline: Cross-country
- Role: Rider

Professional teams
- 2023–2024: Trek Future Racing
- 2025–: Scott–SRAM Racing
Medal record
Men's mountain bike racing
Representing United States
World Championships
Silver medal – second place	2024 Vallnord	Under-23 cross-country short track

Bjorn Riley (born February 21, 2002) is an American cyclist, who specializes in cross-country mountain biking. In 2026, he won his first elite UCI World Cup race on the cross-country short track in Pal–Arinsal, Andorra.

== Major results ==
2019
3rd Cross-country, National Junior Championships
2022
1st Cross-country, National Under-23 Championships
2023
UCI Under-23 XCO World Cup

3rd Mont-Sainte-Anne

2024
National Championships

1st Cross-country
2nd Cross-country short track

2nd Cross-country short track, UCI Under-23 World Championships
2nd Overall UCI Under-23 XCO World Cup

1st Les Gets
2nd Mairiporã
2nd Val di Sole
2nd Crans-Montana
3rd Nové Město na Moravě

2nd Overall UCI Under-23 XCC World Cup

1st Les Gets
1st Val di Sole
2nd Mont-Sainte-Anne
2nd Araxá
2nd Banyoles

2025
National Championships

1st Cross-country short track
2nd Cross-country

2026
National Championships

1st Cross-country short track
2nd Cross-country

UCI XCC World Cup

1st Pal–Arinsal
3rd Lenzerheide

UCI XCO World Cup

3rd Saalfelden–Leogang
3rd Lenzerheide
