= Sina Frei =

Swiss cyclist (born 1997)

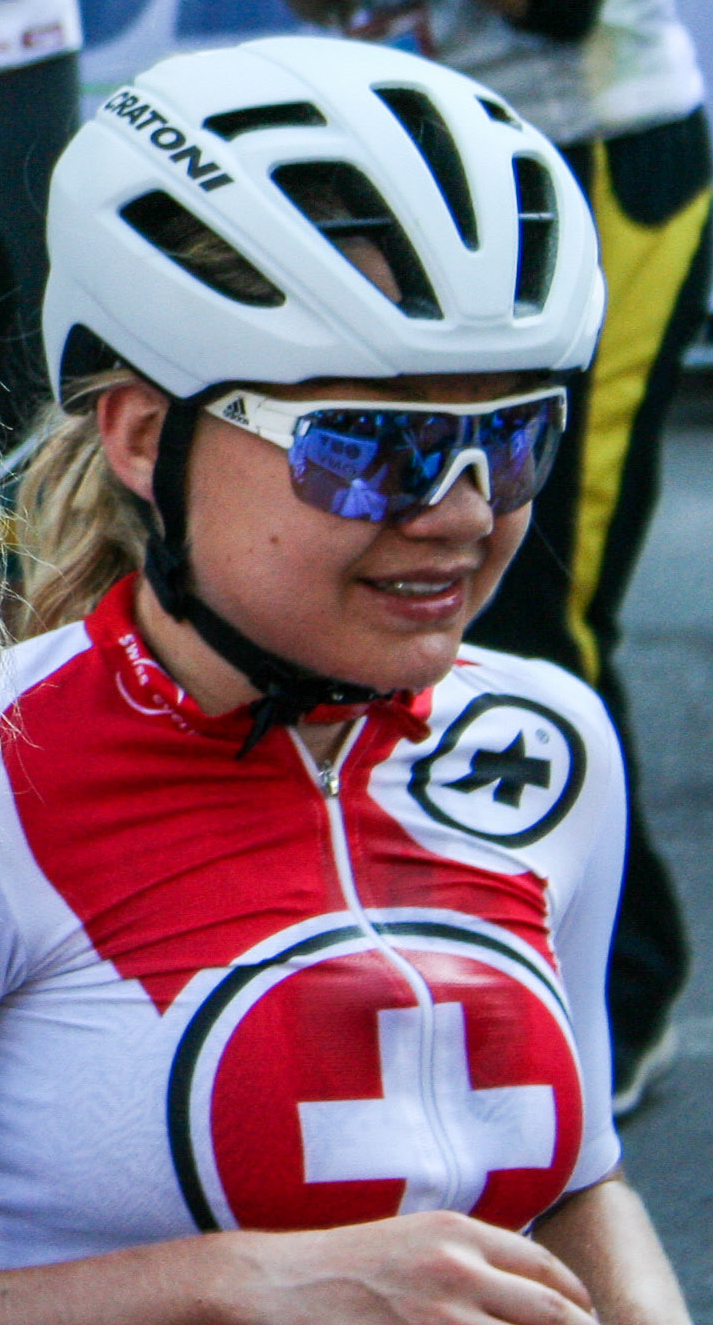
- Frei at the 2018 World Road Cycling Championships

Personal information
- Born: 18 July 1997 (age 29) Männedorf, Switzerland
- Height: 1.51 m (4 ft 11 in)
- Weight: 46 kg (101 lb)

Cycling career
- Sport: Cycling
- Current team: Specialized Factory Racing
- Disciplines: Cross-Country; Mountain bike racing
- Role: Rider

Major wins
- Gravel European Championships (2024) Mountain bike World XC Championships (2026) European XC Championships (2026) XC World Cup 2 individual wins (2026)
Medal record
Representing Switzerland
Women's mountain bike racing
Olympic Games
Silver medal – second place	2020 Tokyo	Cross-country
World Championships
Gold medal – first place	2018 Lenzerheide	Team relay
Gold medal – first place	2021 Val di Sole	Short track
Bronze medal – third place	2020 Leogang	Team relay
Women's cross-country marathon
World Championships
Silver medal – second place	2024 Snowshoe	Women's
Women's gravel bicycle racing
European Championships
Gold medal – first place	2024 Asiago	Elite

Sina Frei (born 18 July 1997) is a Swiss cross-country cyclist.

She participated at the 2018 UCI Mountain Bike World Championships, winning a medal.

On 27 July 2021, Frei won the silver medal at the 2020 Summer Olympics in Tokyo. Her teammates, Jolanda Neff and Linda Indergand won the gold and bronze medals, marking the first Swiss podium at the Olympics since 1936 and the first time a nation won all three medals in a cycling event since 1904.

She also competed for Switzerland at the 2024 Summer Olympics.

== Major results ==
=== Gravel ===
2022
2nd UCI World Championships
2024
1st UEC European Championships

=== Mountain bike ===
2019
2nd Tokyo 2020 Test Event
2020
Swiss Bike Cup

1st Leukerbad

2021
UCI World Championships

1st Short track
3rd Cross-country

1st Overall Cape Epic (with Laura Stigger)

1st Prologue, Stages 1, 2, 3, 4, 5, 6 & 7

2nd Cross-country, Olympic Games
UCI XCC World Cup

2nd Les Gets

Swiss Bike Cup

2nd Gränichen

2022
Ökk Bike Revolution

2nd Huttwil
3rd Chur

2023
Ökk Bike Revolution

1st Engelberg
2nd Rivera
3rd Davos

3rd Cross-country, UEC European Championships
UCI XCC World Cup

3rd Nové Město

2024
UCI XCC World Cup

1st Lake Placid
1st Mont-Sainte-Anne

2nd Marathon, UCI World Championships
2nd Cross-country, National Championships
UCI XCO World Cup

2nd Lake Placid
3rd Mont-Sainte-Anne

Bike Revolution

2nd Huttwil

2025
National Championships

1st Short track
2nd Cross-country

Bike Revolution

2nd Davos

Swiss Bike Cup

2nd Schaan

UCI XCO World Cup

5th Mont-Sainte-Anne

2026
UCI World Championships

1st Cross-country
3rd Short track

UEC European Championships

1st Cross-country
1st Short track

UCI XCO World Cup

1st Mona Yongpyong
1st Les Gets
3rd Nové Město
3rd Pal–Arinsal
4th Lenzerheide

UCI XCC World Cup

1st Mona Yongpyong
1st Les Gets
2nd La Thuile
