= Luca Martin (cyclist) =

French cyclist (born 2002)

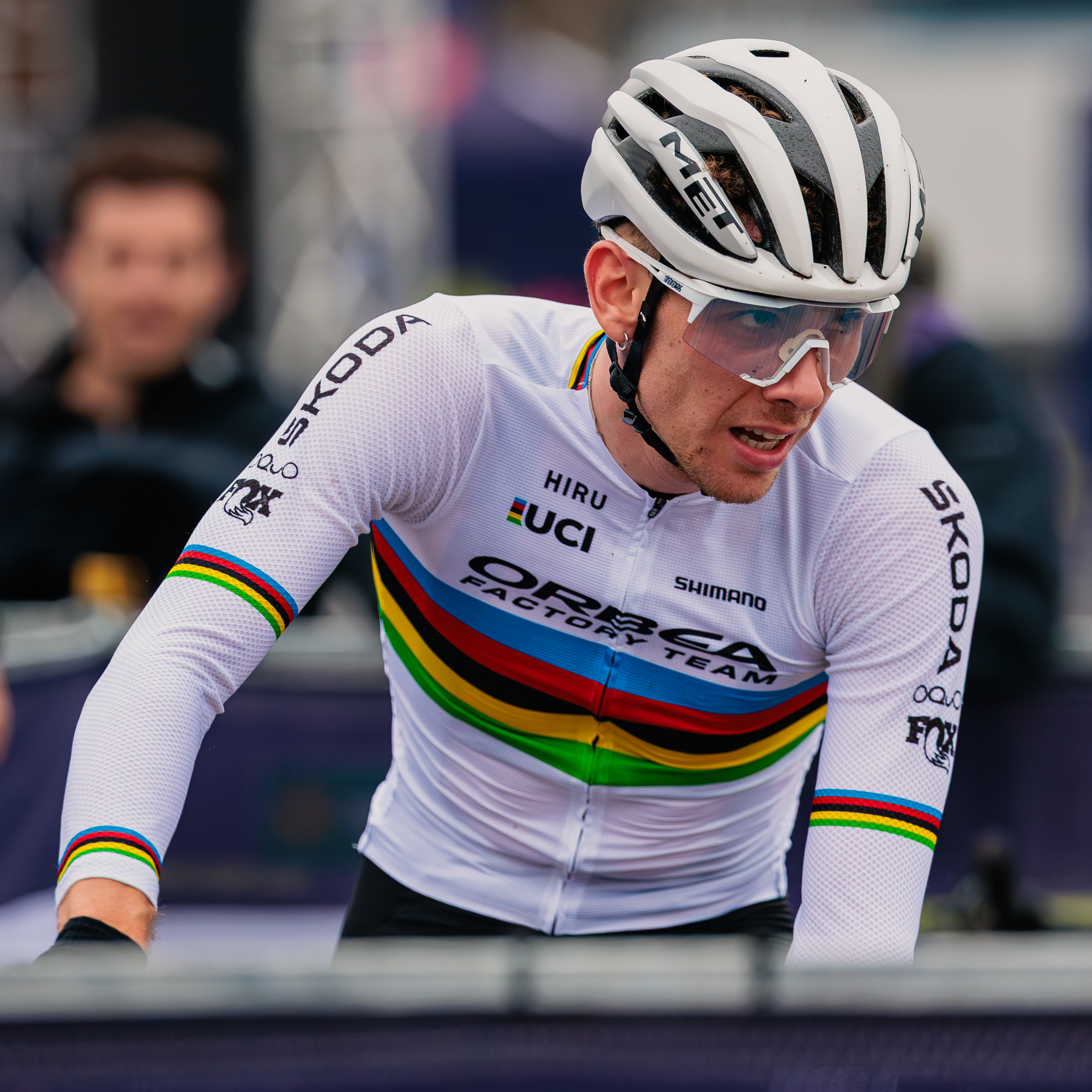

Personal information
- Born: 22 February 2002 (age 24) Tourrette-Levens, France
- Height: 1.72 m (5 ft 8 in)
- Weight: 64 kg (141 lb)

Cycling career
- Sport: Cycling
- Current team: Orbea Factory Team
- Discipline: Mountain bike
- Role: Rider

Amateur team
- 2023–: AVC Aix-en-Provence (road)

Professional teams
- 2019: Veloroc BMC
- 2021–2022: KMC–Orbea
- 2023–: Orbea Factory Team

Major wins
- Mountain bike XC World Cup 3 individual wins (2025, 2026)
Medal record
Representing France
World Championships
Gold medal – first place	2024 Pal Arinsa	Under-23 Cross-country
Gold medal – first place	2020 Leogang	Team relay
Silver medal – second place	2024 Pal Arinsal	Team relay
Silver medal – second place	2019 Mont Sainte-Anne	Junior cross-country
Silver medal – second place	2020 Leogang	Junior cross-country
Bronze medal – third place	2019 Mont Sainte-Anne	Team relay
European Championships
Silver medal – second place	2020 Monte Tamaro	Mixed relay
Bronze medal – third place	2024 Cheile Grădiștei	Under-23 Cross-country

Luca Martin (born 22 February 2002) is a French cross-country mountain biker. He won the under-23 cross-country race at the 2024 UCI Mountain Bike World Championships.

== Major results ==
2019
1st Cross-country, National Junior Championships
UCI World Championships

2nd Junior cross-country
3rd Team relay

2020
UCI World Championships

1st Team relay
2nd Junior cross-country

2nd Team relay, UEC European Championships
2021
1st Cross-country, National Under-23 Championships
2022
1st Cross-country, National Under-23 Championships
UCI Under-23 XCO World Cup

2nd Vallnord

2023
UCI Under-23 XCO World Cup

3rd Pal–Arinsal

UCI Under-23 XCC World Cup

2nd Val di Sole
3rd Snowshoe

2024
UCI World Championships

1st Under-23 cross-country
2nd Team relay

UCI Under-23 XCO World Cup

2nd Nové Mesto
2nd Les Gets
3rd Crans-Montana

UCI Under-23 XCC World Cup

2nd Lake Placid
3rd Crans-Montana

2nd Cross-country, National Under-23 Championships
3rd Cross-country, UEC European Under-23 Championships
2025
2nd Overall UCI XCC World Cup

1st Pal–Arinsal
1st Mont-Sainte-Anne
2nd Les Gets

3rd Overall UCI XCO World Cup

1st Les Gets
2nd Pal–Arinsal

2026
UCI XCO World Cup

1st Lenzerheide
1st La Thuile
2nd Mona Yongpyong
2nd Nové Město

3rd Short track, UCI World Championships
