= Martina Berta =

Italian cross-country mountain biker

- Berta at Snowshoe in 2023

Personal information
- Born: 25 March 1998 (age 28) Turin, Italy

Cycling career
- Sport: Cycling
- Current team: Santa Cruc Rockshox Pro Team
- Discipline: Mountain bike racing
- Role: Rider
- Rider type: Cross-country

Major wins
- Mountain bike XC World Cup 2 individual wins (2026)
Medal record
Representing Italy
Women's mountain bike racing
World Championships
Gold medal – first place	2015 Vallnord	Junior cross-country
Gold medal – first place	2026 Val di Sole	Team relay
Silver medal – second place	2022 Les Gets	Team relay
Silver medal – second place	2025 Crans-Montana	Team relay
Silver medal – second place	2026 Val di Sole	Cross-country
Bronze medal – third place	2016 Nové Město	Junior cross-country
Bronze medal – third place	2024 Vallnord	Team relay
Bronze medal – third place	2024 Vallnord	Cross-country
European Championships
Gold medal – first place	2021 Novi Sad	Team relay
Silver medal – second place	2019 Brno	Team relay

Martina Berta (born 25 March 1998) is an Italian cross-country mountain biker. She is the bronze medalist of the 2024 World mountain bike championships and silver medalist of the 2026 World mountain bike championships in Cross-country Olympic.

She competed in the women's cross-country event at the 2024 Summer Olympics, placing 14th. She is also a five-time elite national champion.

== Major results ==
2015
1st Cross-country, UCI World Junior Championships
1st Cross-country, National Junior Championships
2016
1st Cross-country, National Junior Championships
3rd Cross-country, UCI World Junior Championships
2017
5th Overall UCI Under-23 XCO World Cup

5th Val di Sole
5th Lenzerheide
5th Vallnord

2019
1st Cross-country, National Championships
2nd Team relay, European Championships
4th Overall UCI Under-23 XCO World Cup

1st Lenzerheide
3rd Vallnord

2021
1st Team relay, European Championships
2022
National Championships

1st Cross-country
1st Short track

2nd Team relay, UCI World Championships
UCI XCO World Cup

4th Mont-Sainte-Anne

2023
National Championships

1st Cross-country
1st Short track

UCI XCO World Cup

2nd Val di Sole
3rd Snowshoe
5th Mont-Sainte-Anne

UCI XCC World Cup

4th Vallnord

2024
3rd Cross-country, UCI World Championships
2025
2nd Team relay, UCI World Championships
2026
1st Team relay, UCI World Championships
2nd Cross-country, UCI World Championships
UCI XCO World Cup

1st La Thuile
1st Soldier Hollow
2nd Pal–Arinsal

UCI XCC World Cup

1st Soldier Hollow
3rd Yongpyong
