= Laura Stigger =

Austrian cyclist (born 2000)

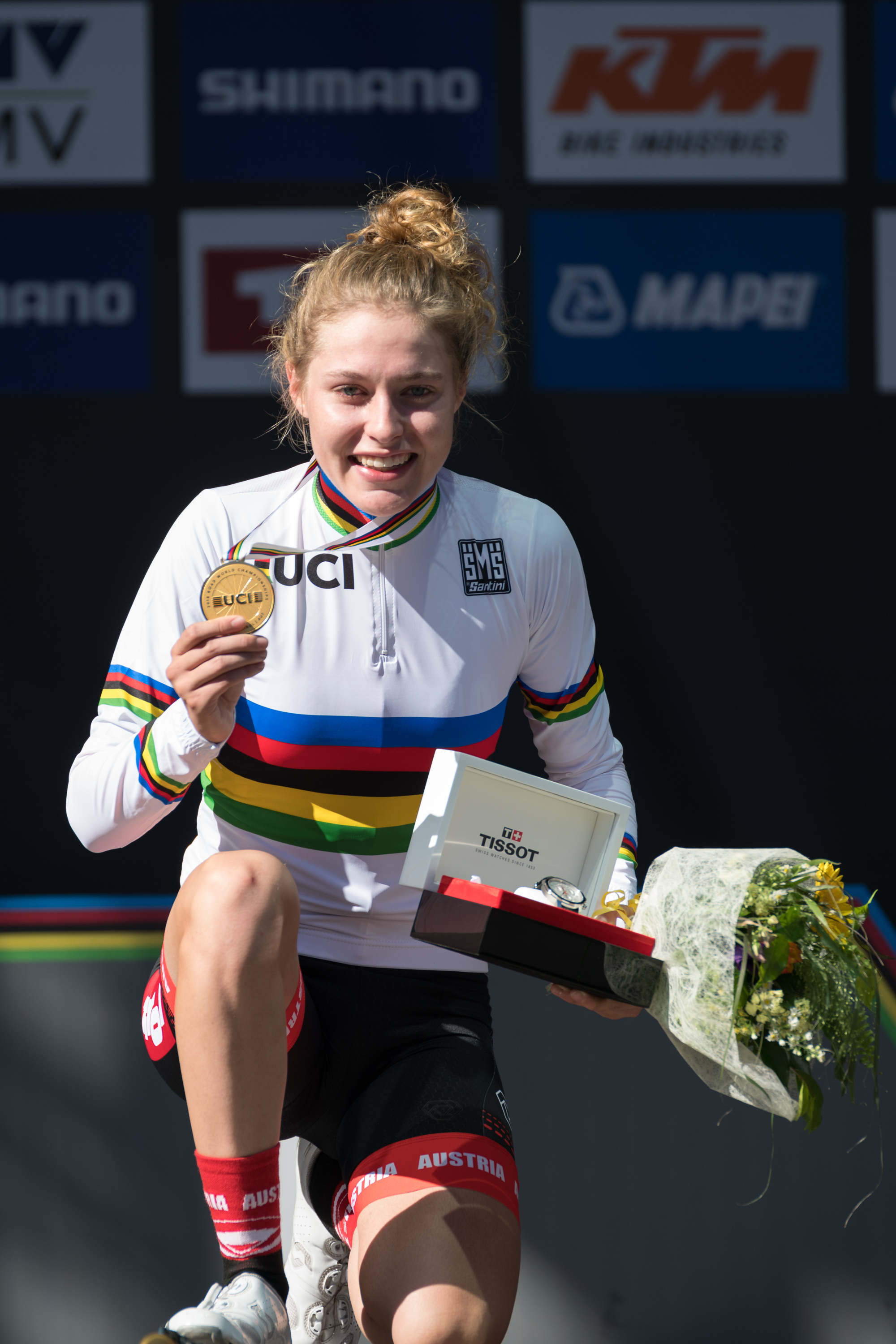
- Stigger in 2018

Personal information
- Born: 25 September 2000 (age 26) Innsbruck, Tyrol, Austria

Cycling career
- Sport: Cycling
- Current team: Team SD Worx–Protime
- Disciplines: Road; Mountain biking
- Role: Rider
- Rider type: Cross-country (MTB)

Professional team
- 2025–: Team SD Worx–Protime

Major wins
- Mountain bike XC World Cup 3 individual wins (2023, 2024, 2026) Cape Epic (2021)
Medal record
Representing Austria
Women's mountain bike race
World Championships
Gold medal – first place	2017 Cairns	Junior Cross-country
Gold medal – first place	2018 Lenzerheide	Junior Cross-country
European Championships
Gold medal – first place	2017 Darfo Boario Terme	Junior Cross-country
Gold medal – first place	2018 Graz	Junior Cross-country
Women's road bicycle racing
World Championships
Gold medal – first place	2018 Innsbruck	Junior road race

Laura Stigger (born 25 September 2000) is an Austrian racing cyclist, who rides for UCI Women's WorldTeam Team SD Worx–Protime. She won the women's junior road race at the 2018 UCI Road World Championships and the junior Mountain Bike race (XCO) event at the 2018 UCI Mountain Bike World Championships. She also won the junior Mountain Bike race (XCO) event at the 2017 UCI Mountain Bike World Championships.

To date, Stigger is the only Austrian cyclist to win both the Road World Championship and the Mountain Bike World Championship in the same year, winning both titles within twenty-two days. The former was only her second road race ever.

In 2017 and 2018, she won every Junior Mountain Bike race she participated in, a total of 26 races, with most of them at international level. It was the same when she was younger still.

She competed in the cross-country race at the 2020 Summer Olympics.

== Major results ==
=== Mountain bike ===
2017
1st Cross-country, UCI World Junior Championships
1st Cross-country, UEC European Junior Championships
2018
1st Cross-country, UCI World Junior Championships
1st Cross-country, UEC European Junior Championships
2020
1st Cross-country, National Championships
Swiss Bike Cup

1st Gstaad

1st Rund um den Roadlberg
UCI XCO World Cup

5th Nové Město I
5th Nové Město II

2021
National Championships

1st Short track
1st Eliminator

1st Overall Cape Epic (with Sina Frei)

1st Prologue, Stages 1, 2, 3, 4, 5, 6 & 7

Swiss Bike Cup

1st Basel

1st Coppa Città Di Albenga
2nd Cross-country, UCI World Under-23 Championships
UCI XCO World Cup

3rd Leogang

2022
UCI XCO World Cup

3rd Leogang
4th Petropolis
4th Vallnord

2023
4th Overall UCI XCO World Cup

1st Snowshoe
3rd Leogang
4th Val di Sole

UCI XCC World Cup

1st Nové Město
1st Val di Sole
1st Mont-Sainte-Anne

1st Haiming
2024
National Championships

1st Cross-country
1st Short track

UCI XCO World Cup

4th Crans-Montana
5th Nové Město

2026
UCI XCO World Cup

1st Nové Město

=== Road ===
2018
1st Road race, UCI World Junior Championships
