= 2024 UCI Mountain Bike World Championships =

International sports competition

- Location: Vallnord, Andorra
- Dates: 28 August – 1 September

The 2024 UCI Mountain Bike World Championships was held from 28 August to 1 September 2024 in Vallnord, Andorra.

== Medal summary ==
=== Medal table ===
* Host nation (Andorra)

Rank	Nation	Gold	Silver	Bronze	Total
1	France	4	7	1	12
2	United States	3	1	1	5
3	Canada	2	1	3	6
4	Great Britain	1	2	2	5
5	Netherlands	1	1	0	2
6	Denmark	1	0	3	4
7	New Zealand	1	0	1	2
7	South Africa	1	0	1	2
9	Austria	1	0	0	1
9	Germany	1	0	0	1
9	Slovakia	1	0	0	1
12	Switzerland	0	2	0	2
13	Chile	0	1	1	2
13	Sweden	0	1	1	2
15	Spain	0	1	0	1
16	Italy	0	0	2	2
17	Slovenia	0	0	1	1
Totals (17 entries)		17	17	17	51

=== Men's events ===
Event	Gold		Silver		Bronze	
Cross-country Olympic	Alan Hatherly; South Africa	1:09:51	Victor Koretzky; France	+0:22	Tom Pidcock; Great Britain	+0:39
Cross-country short track	Victor Koretzky; France	21:39	Charlie Aldridge; Great Britain	+0:03	Alan Hatherly; South Africa	+0:03
Electric MTB Cross-country	Jérôme Gilloux; France	1:01:32	Martín Vidaurre; Chile	+0:29	Hugo Pigeon; France	+0:45
Downhill	Loris Vergier; France	2:38.661	Benoît Coulanges; France	+0.148	Finn Iles; Canada	+0.169

=== Women's events ===
Event	Gold		Silver		Bronze	
Cross-country Olympic	Puck Pieterse; Netherlands	1:09:41	Anne Terpstra; Netherlands	+0:59	Martina Berta; Italy	+1:19
Cross-country short track	Evie Richards; Great Britain	19:46	Pauline Ferrand-Prevot; France	+0:01	Jenny Rissveds; Sweden	+0:18
Electric MTB Cross-country	Sofia Wiedenroth; Germany	1:00:09	Nathalie Schneitter; Switzerland	+1:03	Florencia Espiñeira Herreros; Chile	+2:06
Downhill	Valentina Höll; Austria	3:00.212	Myriam Nicole; France	+0.520	Tahnée Seagrave; Great Britain	+1.212

=== Mixed relay ===
Event	Gold		Silver		Bronze	
Cross-country Olympic	United States; Brayden Johnson (MU); Nicholas Konecny (MJ); Haley Batten (WE); Vida Lopez de San Roman (WJ); Madigan Munro (WU); Christopher Blevins (ME)	1:19:38	France; Luca Martin (MU); Nicolas Kalanquin (MJ); Loana Lecomte (WE); Olivia Onesti (WU); Anaïs Moulin (WJ); Mathis Azzaro (ME)	1:19:41	Italy; Luca Braidot (ME); Matteo Siffredi (MU); Martina Berta (WE); Giada Martinoli (WJ); Valentina Corvi (WU); Mattia Stenico (MJ)	1:21:09

=== Under-23 and Junior events ===
Event	Gold		Silver		Bronze	
Men's Under-23 Cross-country	Luca Martin; France	59:48	Dario Lillo; Switzerland	+0:21	Tobias Lillelund; Denmark	+0:52
Men's Under-23 Cross-country short track	Riley Amos; United States	22:02	Bjorn Riley; United States	22:02	Tobias Lillelund; Denmark	22:06
Men's Junior Cross-country	Albert Philipsen; Denmark	1:01:59	Hugo Franco Gallego; Spain	1:03:54	Nikolaj Hougs; Denmark	1:03:55
Men's Junior Downhill	Asa Vermette; United States	2:39.185	Max Alran; France	2:40.701	Bode Burke; United States	2:41.699
Women's Under-23 Cross-country	Isabella Holmgren; Canada	1:11:12	Olivia Onesti; France	+1:17	Emilly Johnston; Canada	+2:31
Women's Under-23 Cross-country short track	Isabella Holmgren; Canada	20:31	Ella Maclean-Howell; Great Britain	20:53	Ava Holmgren; Canada	20:57
Women's Junior Cross-country	Viktória Chladoňová; Slovakia	1:01:24	Rafaelle Carrier; Canada	1:02:00	Maruša Tereza Šerkezi; Slovenia	1:02:55
Women's Junior Downhill	Erice van Leuven; New Zealand	2:59.891	Ella Svegby; Sweden	3:06.248	Sacha Earnest; New Zealand	3:12.071
