= Anna Weinbeer =

Swiss cyclist (born 1994)

Personal information
- Born: December 8, 1994 (age 31) Basel, Switzerland

Cycling career
- Sport: Cycling
- Disciplines: Cross-Country; Mountain bike racing
- Role: Rider
Medal record
Women's mountain bike racing
Representing Switzerland
World Championships
Silver medal – second place	2025 Valais	Marathon
Gold medal – first place	2026 Trentino	Marathon

Anna Weinbeer (born 8 December 1994) is a Swiss cross-country mountain bike cyclist. She was a silver medalist at the 2025 UCI Mountain Bike World Championships.

== Biography ==
She is from Basel, Switzerland. She started mountain biking in 2019, but pursued it as a hobby alongside an office job for many years.

In July 2025, she recorded a win in Kirchzarten, Germany at the Black Forest Ultra Bike Marathon, winning by eleven minutes. The following month she won at the 80 km Eiger Bike Challenge in Switzerland.

In September 2025, she won the silver medal at the 125 km UCI Mountain Bike Marathon World Championships in Valais, Switzerland, with a second-place finish behind American Kate Courtney but ahead of defending champion Mona Mitterwallner of Austria.

== Major results ==
2025
2nd Marathon, UCI World Championships
