= Mont Chéry =

Mountain in Haute-Savoie, France

- Location within France

Highest point
- Elevation: 1,826 m (5,991 ft)
- Coordinates: 46°10′08″N 06°38′53″E

Geography
- Location: Haute-Savoie, France
- Parent range: Chablais Alps

Mont Chéry (1,826 m) is a mountain in the Chablais Alps in Haute-Savoie, France.
