= Leogang =

- Municipality
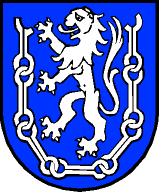
- Coat of arms

- Location within Austria
- Coordinates: 47°25′00″N 12°45′00″E
- Country: Austria
- State: Salzburg
- District: Zell am See

Government
  - Mayor: Josef Grießner (ÖVP)

Area
  - Total: 90.29 km^{2} (34.86 sq mi)
- Elevation: 788 m (2,585 ft)

Population (2018-01-01)
  - Total: 3,263
  - Density: 36.14/km^{2} (93.60/sq mi)
- Time zone: UTC+1 (CET)
  - Summer (DST): UTC+2 (CEST)
- Postal code: 5771
- Area code: 06583
- Vehicle registration: ZE
- Website: www.leogang.at

Leogang is a municipality in the district of Zell am See (Pinzgau region), in the state of Salzburg in Austria. It is a famous winter sports and summer mountain biking resort.

== Population ==
Historical population
Year	Pop.	±%
1869	1,240	—
1880	1,436	+15.8%
1890	1,415	−1.5%
1900	1,498	+5.9%
1910	1,713	+14.4%
1923	1,813	+5.8%
1934	1,879	+3.6%
1939	1,944	+3.5%
1951	2,122	+9.2%
1961	2,207	+4.0%
1971	2,556	+15.8%
1981	2,726	+6.7%
1991	3,034	+11.3%
2001	3,035	+0.0%
2011	3,089	+1.8%

== Sights ==
Mining and Gothic Museum
tourist mine Schwarzleo

== Gallery ==
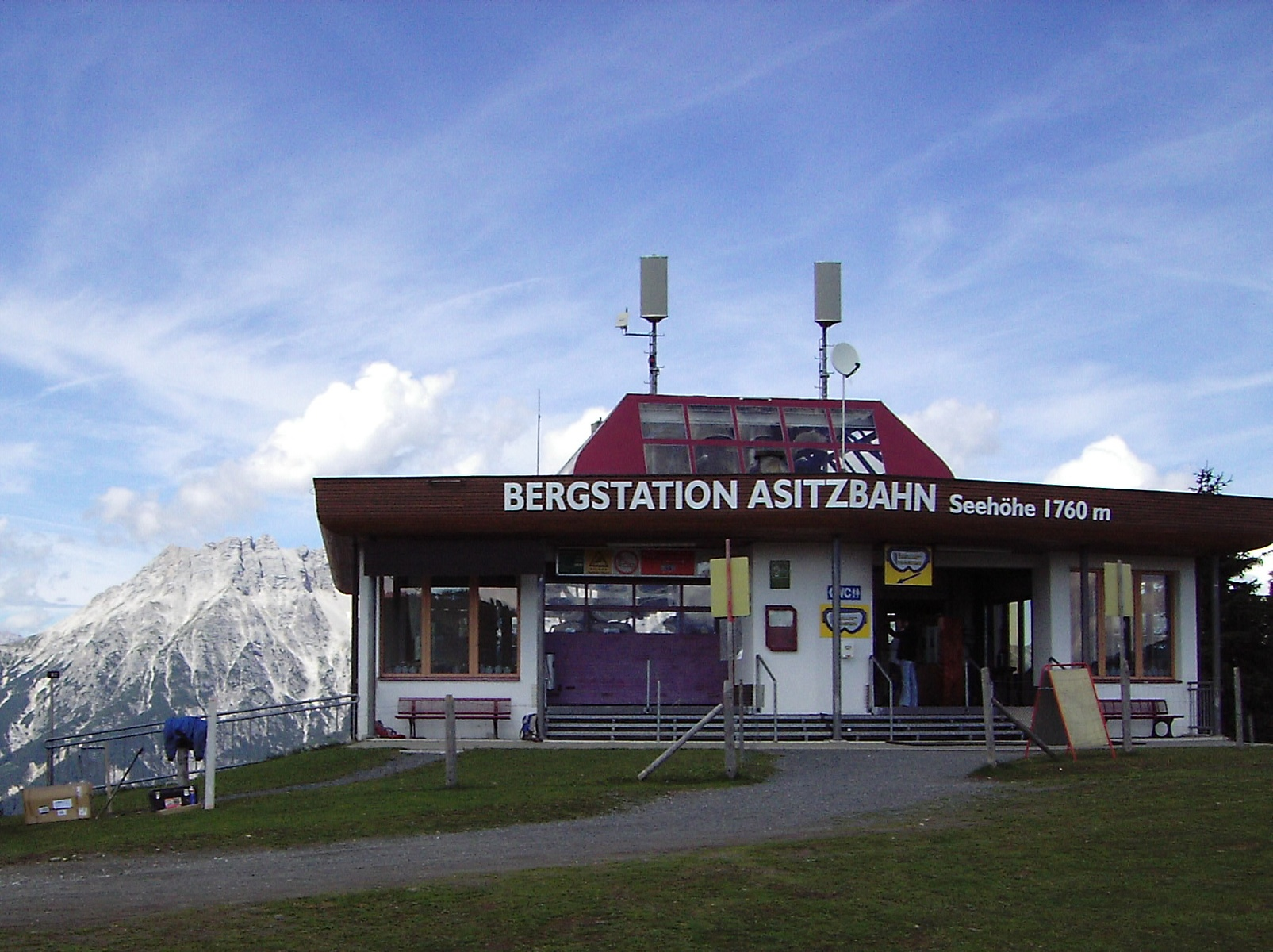
Die Bergstation der Leoganger Gondelbahn im Sommer...

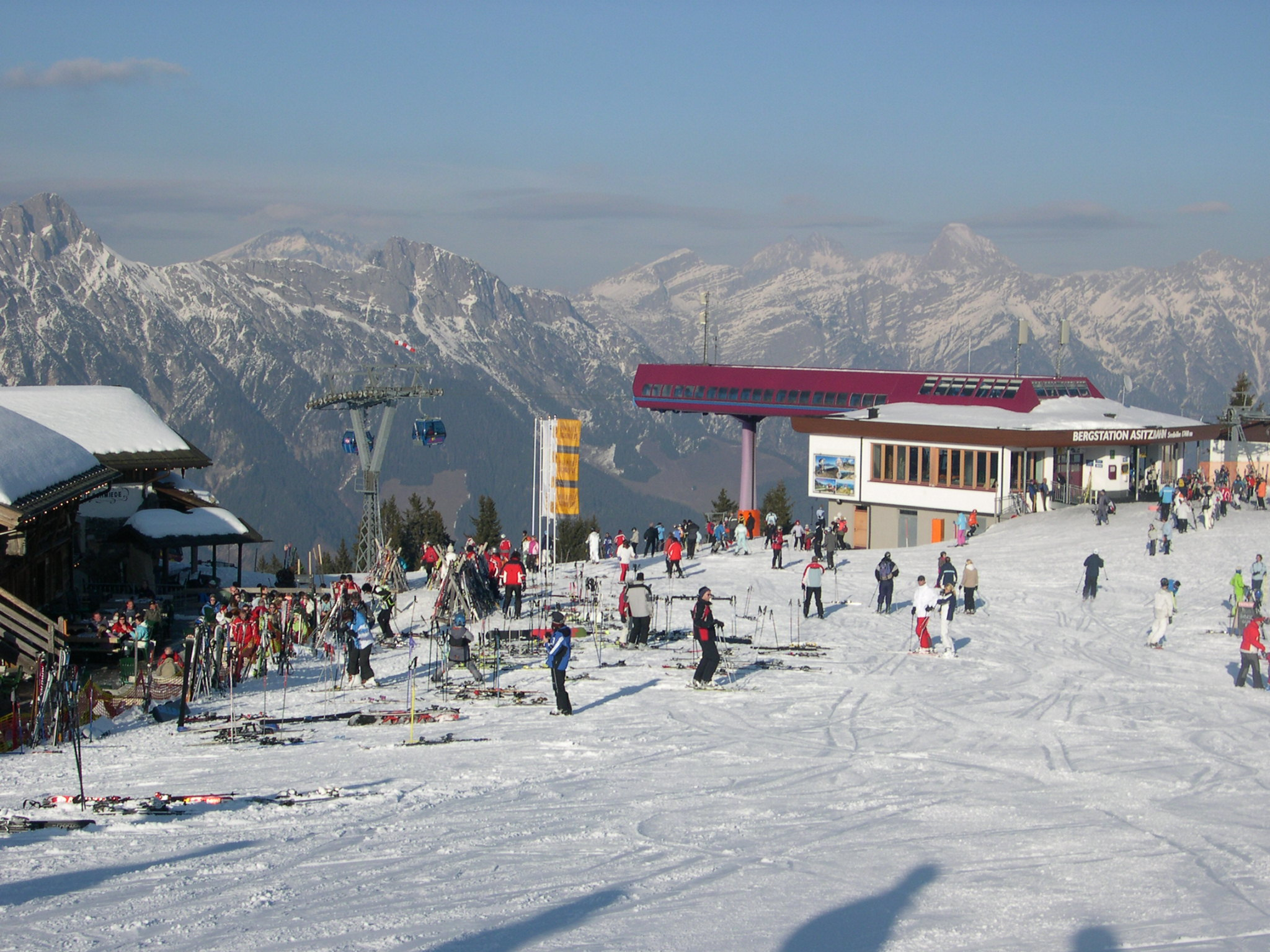
...und im Winter

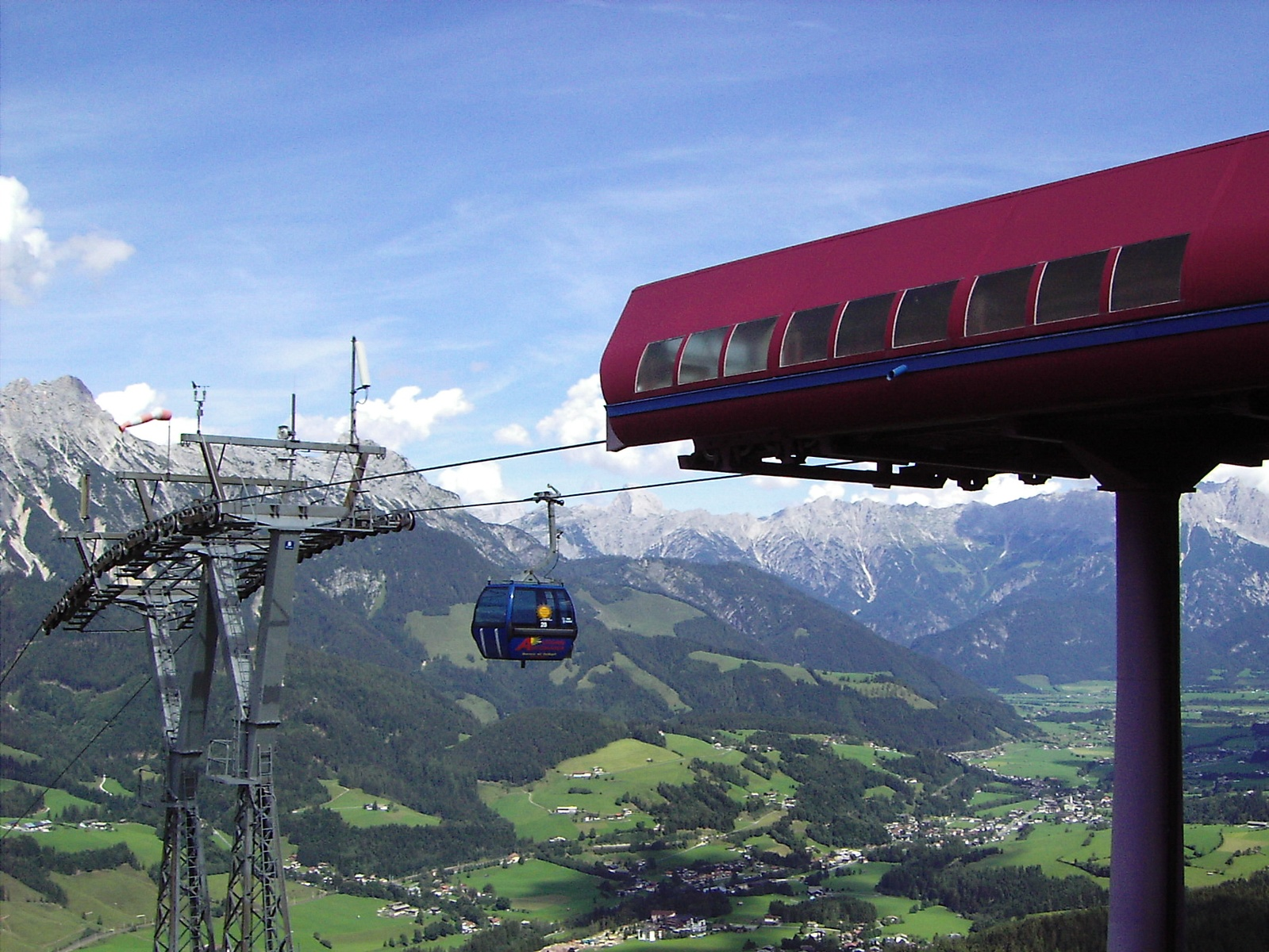
Blick in Richtung Leogang von der Asitzbahn aus

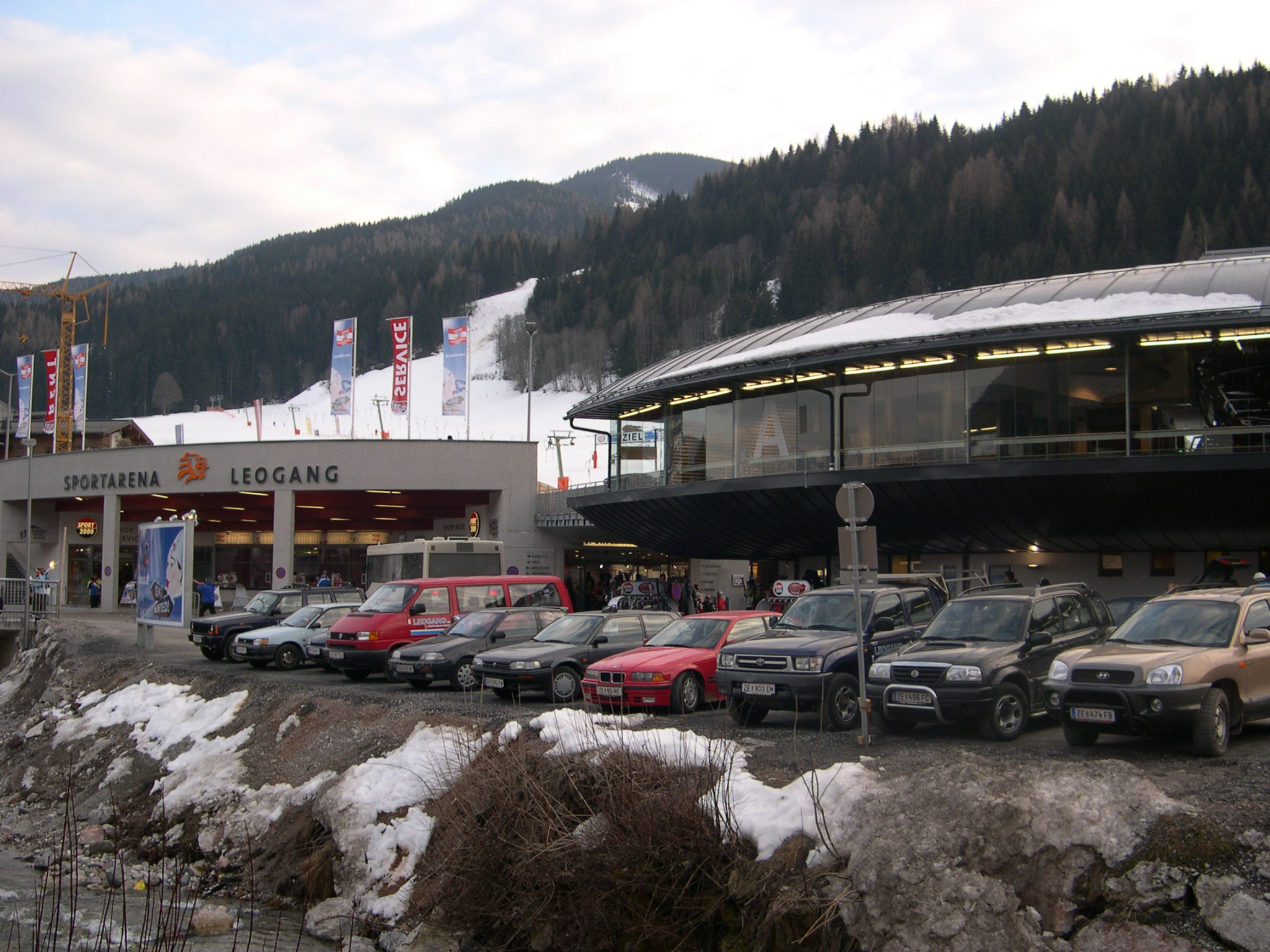
Die neue Leoganger Talstation im Winter 2006/07
