= Les Gets =

Les Gets Lou Zhé (Savoyard)
- Commune
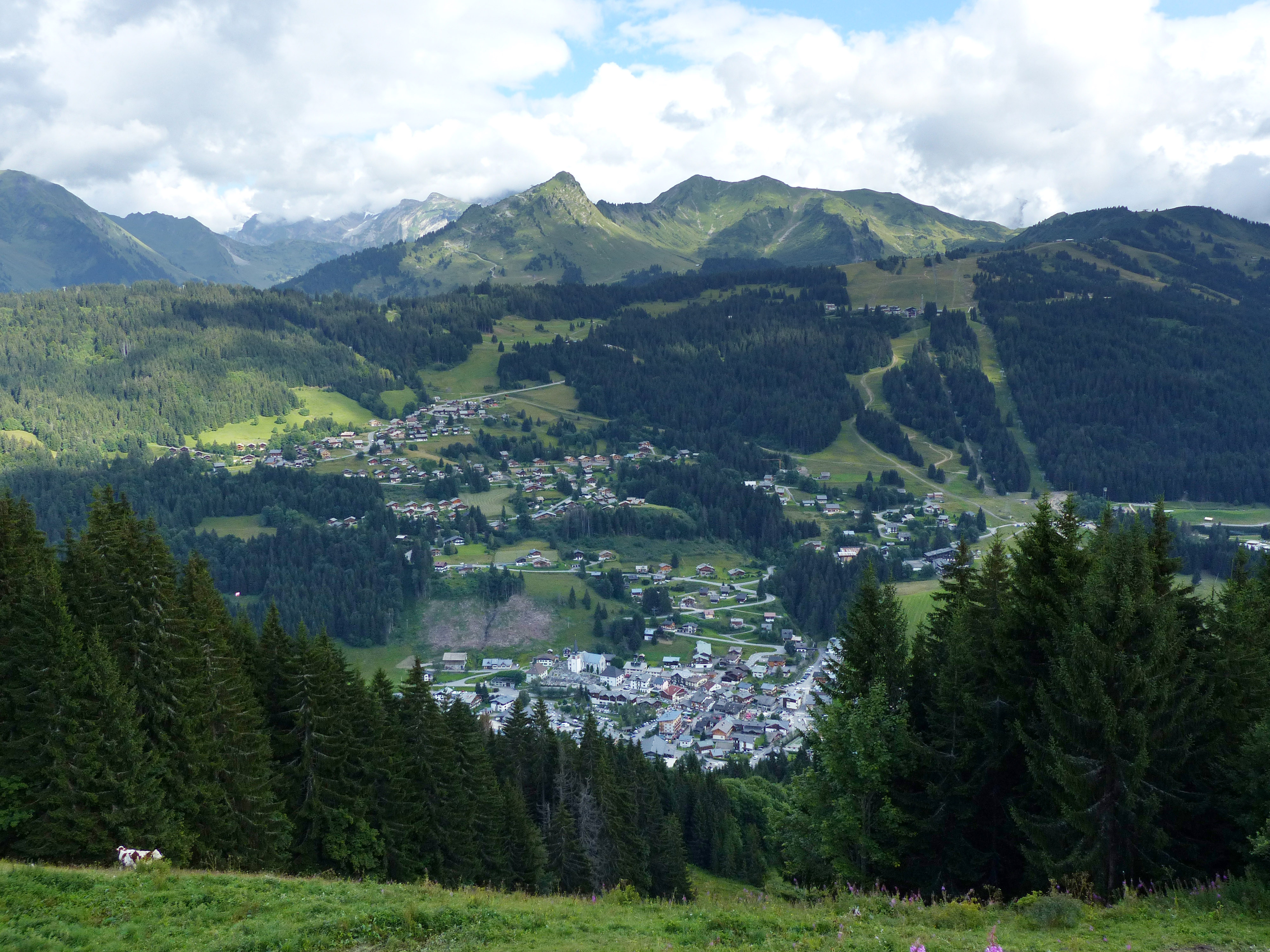
- Les Gets seen from Mont Chéry

- Coat of arms
- Location of Les Gets
- Location within France Location within Auvergne-Rhône-Alpes
- Coordinates: 46°09′38″N 6°40′15″E
- Country: France
- Region: Auvergne-Rhône-Alpes
- Department: Haute-Savoie
- Arrondissement: Thonon-les-Bains
- Canton: Évian-les-Bains

Government
  - Mayor (2024–2026): Philippe Vinet
- Area^{1}: 29.98 km^{2} (11.58 sq mi)
- Elevation: 1,172 m (3,845 ft)
- Highest elevation: 1,820 m (5,970 ft)
- Lowest elevation: 900 m (3,000 ft)
- Population (2023): 1,227
  - Density: 40.93/km^{2} (106.0/sq mi)
- Time zone: UTC+01:00 (CET)
  - Summer (DST): UTC+02:00 (CEST)
- INSEE/Postal code: 74134 /74260
- ^{1} French Land Register data, which excludes lakes, ponds, glaciers > 1 km^{2} (0.386 sq mi or 247 acres) and river estuaries.

Les Gets (French pronunciation: [le ʒɛ], [le ʒe]; Savoyard: Lou Zhé) is a commune in the department of Haute-Savoie, in the region of Auvergne-Rhône-Alpes, southeastern France.

The village's first single-person chair lift was opened in 1938 with the first chair lift on Mont Chéry in 1954.

== Geography ==
Les Gets is situated on the col between Taninges and Morzine, at the western edge of the Portes du Soleil ski area.

=== Climate ===
Climate data for Gets (Les), 1172m (1991−2020 normals, extremes 1958−present)
Month	Jan	Feb	Mar	Apr	May	Jun	Jul	Aug	Sep	Oct	Nov	Dec	Year
Record high °C (°F)	14.1 (57.4)	15.7 (60.3)	20.0 (68.0)	23.6 (74.5)	28.7 (83.7)	33.7 (92.7)	33.3 (91.9)	32.1 (89.8)	27.5 (81.5)	24.7 (76.5)	20.0 (68.0)	19.0 (66.2)	33.7 (92.7)
Mean daily maximum °C (°F)	2.4 (36.3)	3.4 (38.1)	7.1 (44.8)	11.0 (51.8)	15.4 (59.7)	19.4 (66.9)	21.6 (70.9)	21.2 (70.2)	16.7 (62.1)	12.6 (54.7)	6.6 (43.9)	2.9 (37.2)	11.7 (53.1)
Daily mean °C (°F)	−1.1 (30.0)	−0.8 (30.6)	2.5 (36.5)	6.0 (42.8)	10.2 (50.4)	14.0 (57.2)	16.1 (61.0)	15.8 (60.4)	11.9 (53.4)	8.1 (46.6)	2.8 (37.0)	−0.5 (31.1)	7.1 (44.8)
Mean daily minimum °C (°F)	−4.7 (23.5)	−4.9 (23.2)	−2.0 (28.4)	0.9 (33.6)	5.1 (41.2)	8.6 (47.5)	10.5 (50.9)	10.4 (50.7)	7.0 (44.6)	3.6 (38.5)	−1.0 (30.2)	−3.8 (25.2)	2.5 (36.5)
Record low °C (°F)	−24.9 (−12.8)	−21.8 (−7.2)	−21.3 (−6.3)	−15.8 (3.6)	−9.0 (15.8)	−2.7 (27.1)	0.4 (32.7)	0.0 (32.0)	−3.0 (26.6)	−9.4 (15.1)	−16.8 (1.8)	−23.9 (−11.0)	−24.9 (−12.8)
Average precipitation mm (inches)	166.8 (6.57)	136.8 (5.39)	137.3 (5.41)	122.0 (4.80)	159.9 (6.30)	151.5 (5.96)	148.6 (5.85)	147.3 (5.80)	134.6 (5.30)	147.2 (5.80)	157.0 (6.18)	198.1 (7.80)	1,807.1 (71.16)
Average precipitation days (≥ 1.0 mm)	11.8	10.4	10.6	10.9	14.3	12.3	11.7	11.6	10.0	11.3	12.0	12.2	139.1
Source: Meteociel

== Culture ==
Les Gets contains a museum of Mechanical Music and hosts a festival of Mechanical Music bi-annually. This has been running for 25 years. During this period the streets are closed off and barrel organs or orgues fill the streets with mechanical music. Many of the organ grinders come from other European countries, such as Germany and Holland.

Traditional Savoy dishes are central to Les Gets cuisine. These include tartiflette, a dish of potatoes "au gratin" with reblochon cheese and lardons. A traditional liqueur, génépi, is also often drunk as a digestif, although the exact constitution of this medicinal drink varies as many residents produce their own.

== Nightlife ==
There are many restaurants ranging from the family-friendly and reasonably priced to fairly top-end. They mostly specialise in local savoyard cuisine.

Les Gets has many pubs and bars. In the summer, there are all kinds of evening activities in the centre of town, ranging from discos to the "Pot de Bienvenue" (a welcome drink) on a Monday evening. A lot of emphasis is given to children's entertainment, such as wooden games set out in the street, street performers and a carousel. Live bands regularly perform on the semi-permanent stage in the centre of the village, attracting both locals and tourists.

== Sports ==
=== Summer ===
In the summer, Les Gets hosts many downhill mountain biking events. There are two distinct downhill mountain bike areas, one on each side of the village. The downhill mountain bike run on Mt Chéry has been used in the Mountain Bike World Cups in 1996, 1998, 1999, 2000, 2002, 2003, 2019, 2020, 2021 and in the Mountain Bike World Championships in 2004 and 2022.

Les Gets has an 18-hole par 70 golf course 5,264 metres (17,270 ft) long, which overlooks Mont Blanc. In the winter it forms part of the pistes.

=== Winter ===
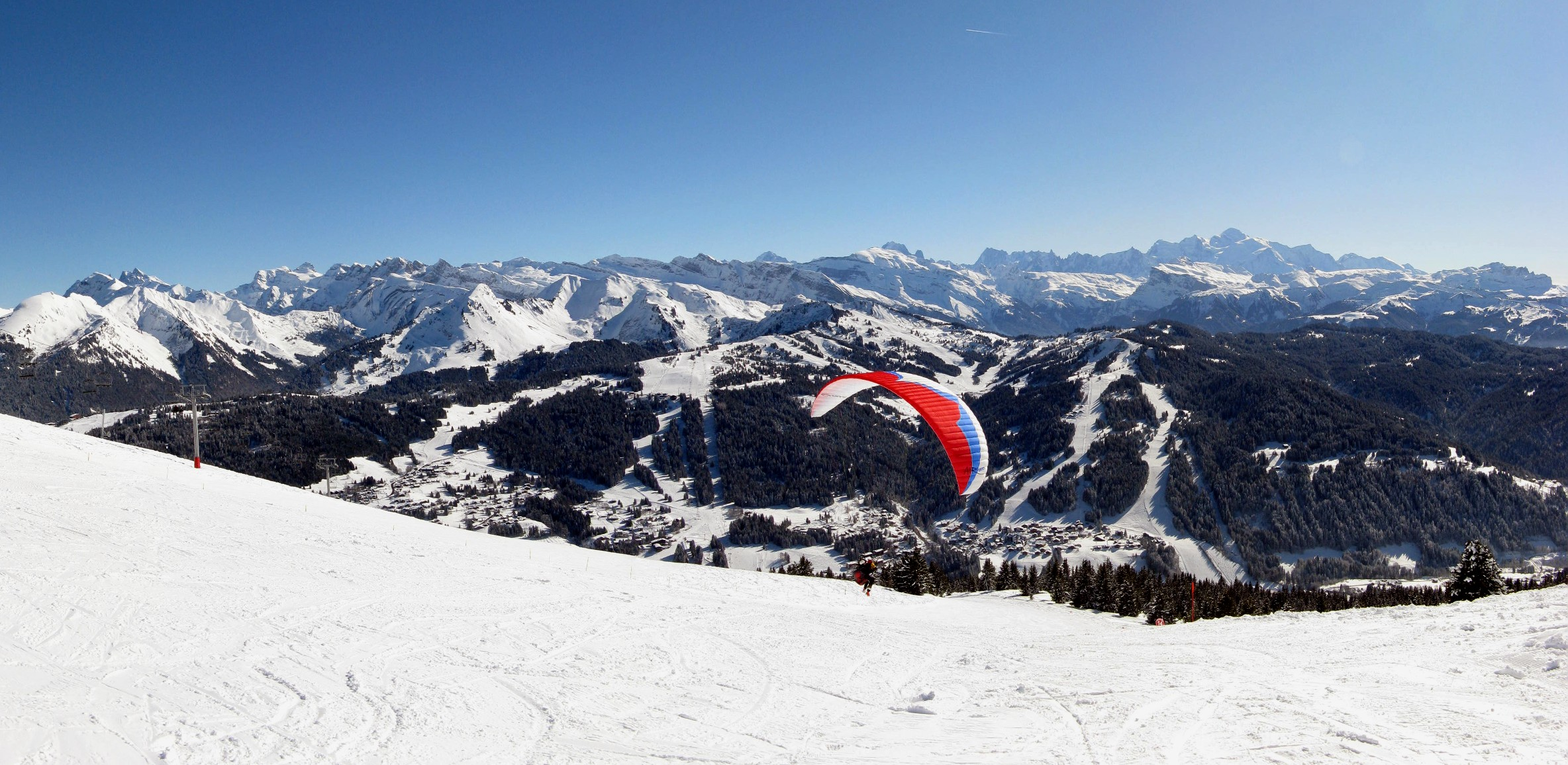

Les Gets is a linked ski resort within the Portes du Soleil. Lift passes can be purchased for Les Gets and the neighbouring area of Morzine, or for the wider Portes du Soleil. Combined, Morzine and Les Gets have around 50 lifts across several distinct ski areas. Lift passes for Mont Chéry (at one side of Les Gets) can also be purchased for that area only.

The ski area consists mainly of blue and red runs (beginner and intermediate). There is an area known as "The Bowl" into which numerous ski runs and chairlifts feed. Also in this area are the resort's most easily accessible black runs: 'Yeti', accessed via the resort's slowest chairlift, La Rosta, and Myrtilles accessed by the Grains d'Or Express. Mont Chéry hosts the majority of black runs, also having numerous red runs, with just one blue and no green pistes. It is the "locals'" mountain, Les Chavannes being the tourist side.

There are several spots for off-piste skiing and snowboarding, including to the sides of 'Yeti', the long black run off Chamossiere and one a short hike from the top of the Ranfoilly lift. The latter has been rated as one of the best off-piste powder bowls in Europe (although there is very often a medium chance of avalanches).

The snowpark is located on Mont Chéry, which is on the ski area on the other side of the village. A bus connects the two sides, however it takes just as long as it does to walk. The snowpark has kickers, a spine, rails, boxes, a boarder cross and new for 2007–08 was a large air bag. The park is fairly small and served by a two-man chairlift.

Les Gets has an area of the mountain for children only, le Grande Cry. This has two button lifts and several runs, all themed around trappers and Native Americans. They hold weekly treasure hunts for children.

Many companies offer ski lessons for adults and children, private and public. The main company operating in the area is ESF (L'Ecole du Ski Francais), which has a building situated at the foot of the slopes, adjacent to Les Gets Village itself.

There is an open-air ice skating rink in the centre of the village.

== See also ==
- List of highest paved roads in Europe
- List of mountain passes
- Communes of the Haute-Savoie department
