= La Thuile, Aosta Valley =

La Thuile La Tchouiille (Valdôtain)
- Comune
- Comune di La Thuile; Commune de La Thuile
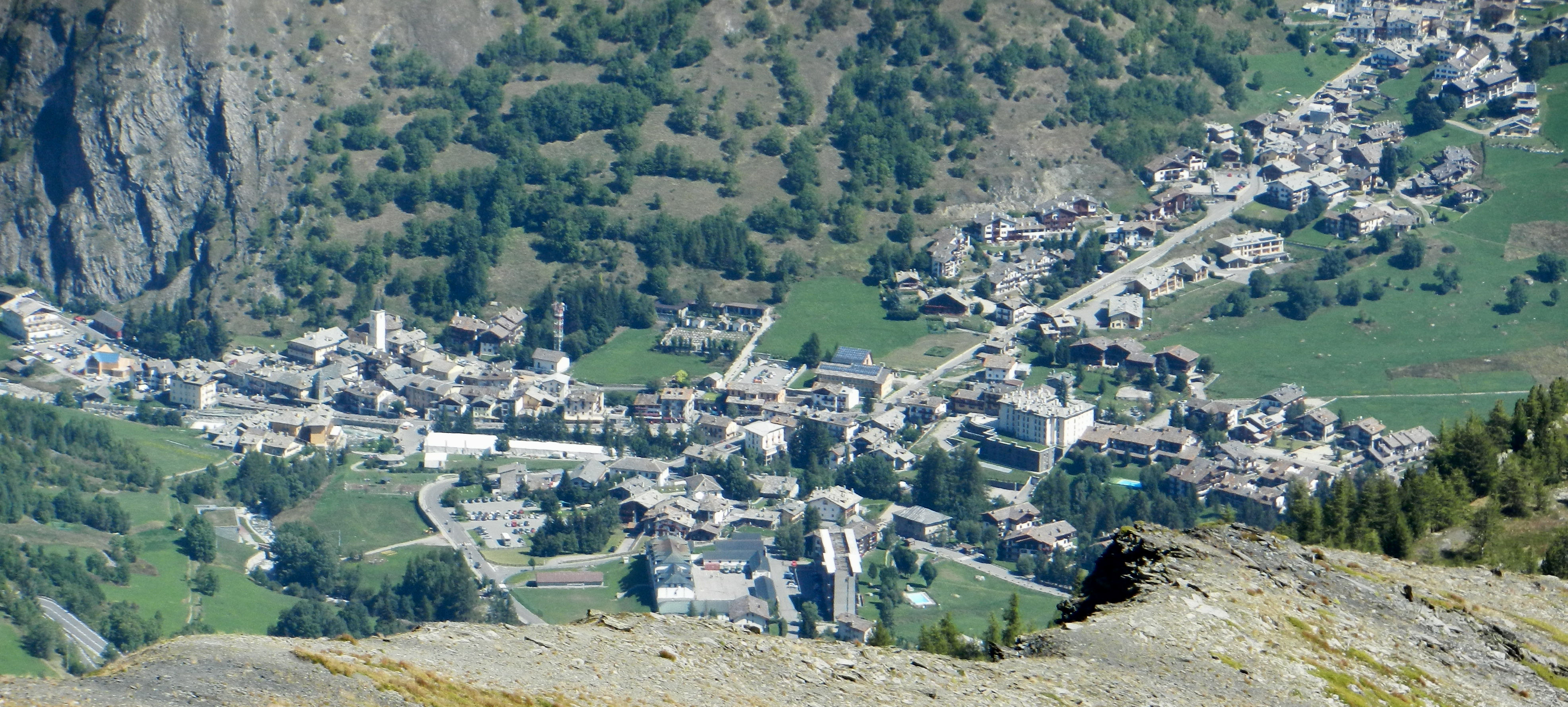

- Coat of arms

- Location within Italy Location within Aosta Valley
- Coordinates: 45°42′N 6°57′E
- Country: Italy
- Region: Aosta Valley
- Province: none
- Frazioni: Buic, Thovex, Moulin, Villaret, Bathieu, Entrèves, Petite Golette, Grande Golette, Pont Serrand, Arly, Les Granges, La Joux, Pierre-carrée, Preyllon, Les Suches, Petit-Saint-Bernard, Petosan, Faubourg, Preylet

Area
  - Total: 125 km^{2} (48 sq mi)
- Elevation: 1,450 m (4,760 ft)

Population (31 December 2022)
  - Total: 790
  - Density: 6.3/km^{2} (16/sq mi)
- Demonym: Thuileins
- Time zone: UTC+1 (CET)
  - Summer (DST): UTC+2 (CEST)
- Postal code: 11016
- Dialing code: 0165
- Patron saint: Saint Nicholas
- Saint day: 9 May

La Thuile (French: [la tɥil]; Valdôtain: La Tchouiille) is a town and comune in the Aosta Valley of northwest Italy.

== Geography ==
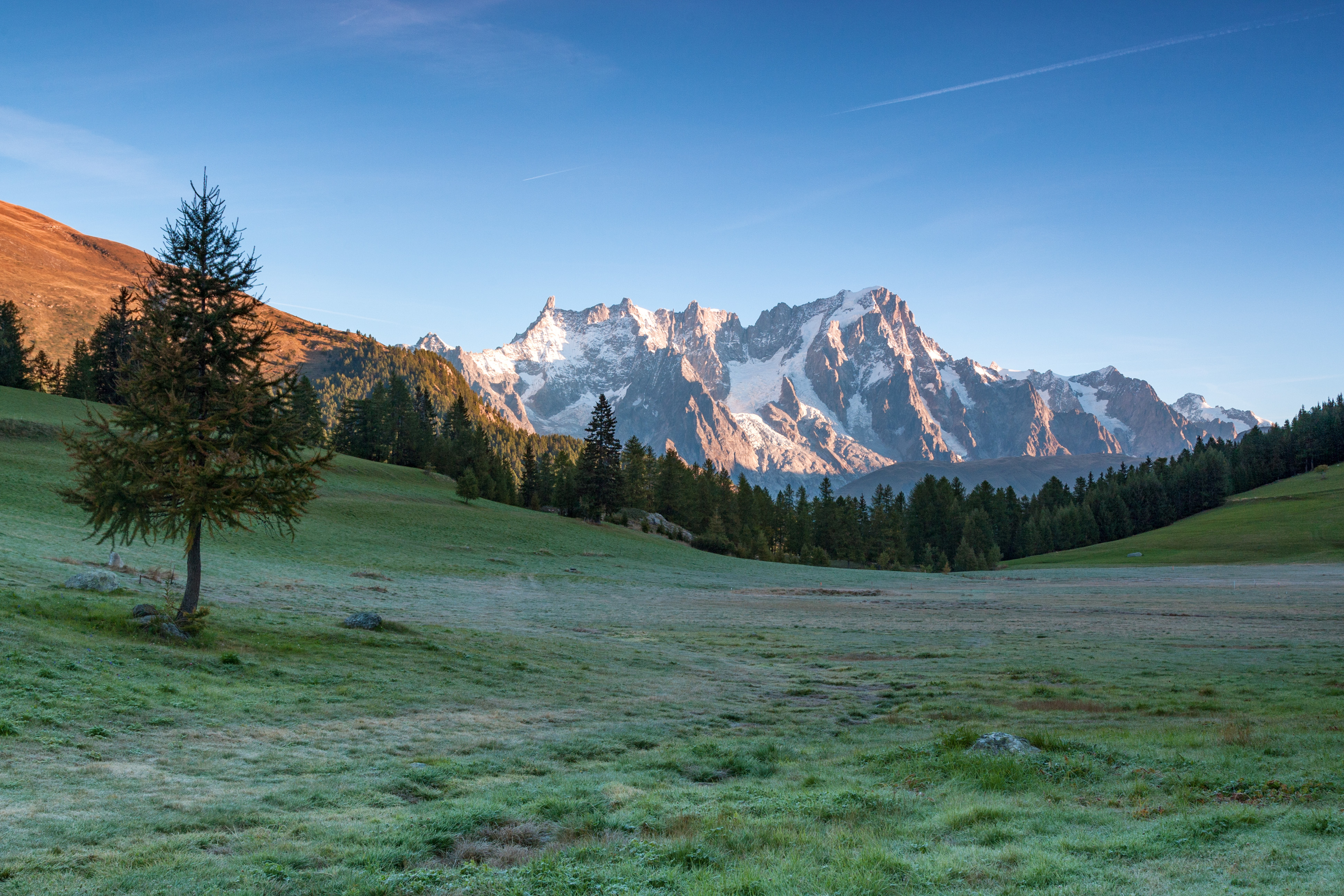
Dent du Géant and Grandes Jorasses seen from Petosan

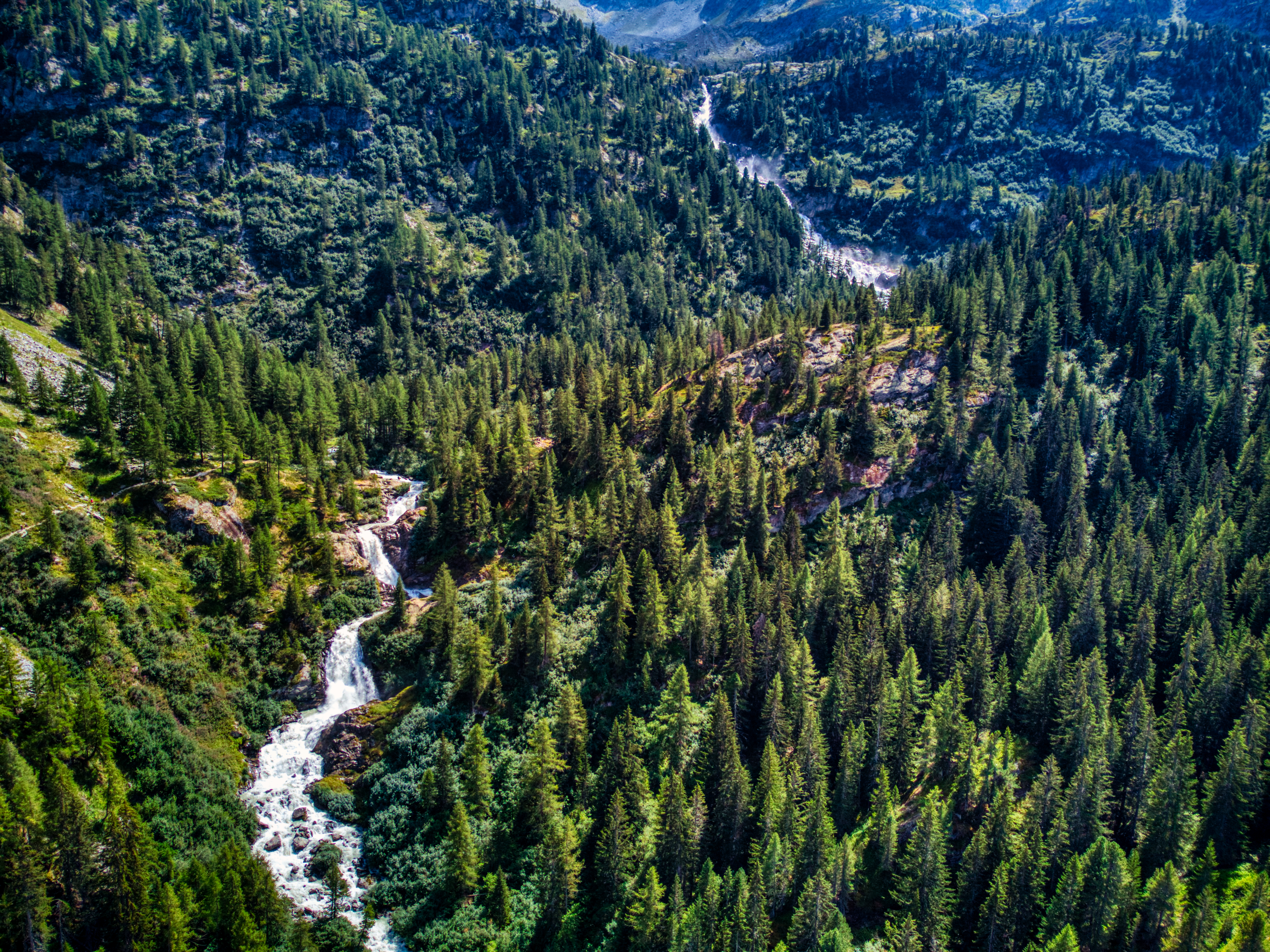
Rutor waterfalls

La Thuile is located in the Alps at the extreme north-west of the country, close to the French alpine town of La Rosière. The town is crossed by the road going from Pré-Saint-Didier in the north-west up to the Little St Bernard Pass in the south-east linking Italy to Bourg-Saint-Maurice and the Isère Valley in France.

== Economy ==
Coal mining (anthracite) was important in the area before World War II, many diggings and old mining structures can be seen around the village. Nowadays, La Thuile depends on tourism, in winter as one of the main Italian Alpine ski resorts linked with La Rosière, as well as in summer (hiking).

== Events ==
La Thuile has been the venue for several major annual international winter conferences: "Les Rencontres de Physique de la Vallée d'Aoste" organized by Italy's National Institute for Nuclear Physics, and "Rencontres de Moriond" organized by the French National Institute of Nuclear and Particle Physics.

In February 2016 the slopes of La Thuile hosted, for the first time in history, three competitions (two downhill and one super G) valid for the FIS Alpine Ski World Cup female. In 2020, the female worldcup was held on Saturday 29 February and Sunday 1 March 2020, respectively with the downhill and the super-G, but the latter was cancelled due to bad weather.

The Enduro World Series were held in La Thuile in 2014, as well as round 4 of the Enduro World Series in 2016. The Women's Skiing World Cup was held in 2025.

== Transportation ==
Public transportation includes regular buses connecting La Thuile to Pré-Saint-Didier, the latter has a railway station (closed in 2015) connected to the Italian railway network via Aosta. One of the closest airports is Geneva International Airport approximately 120 km (75 mi) away.

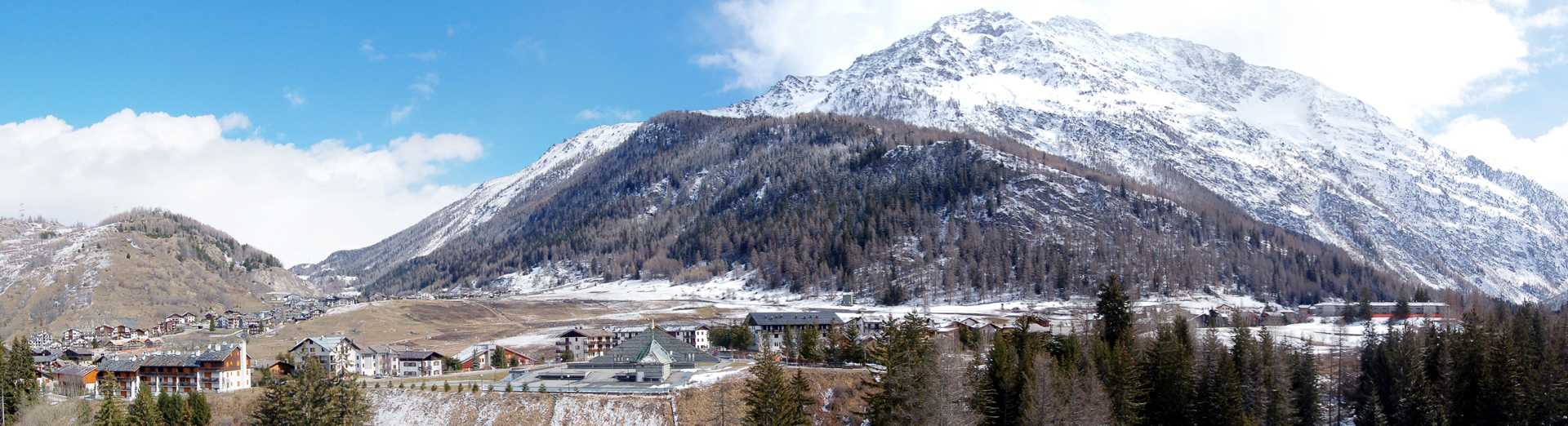
Panoramic view of La Thuile

== International relations ==
=== Twin towns – Sister cities ===
La Thuile is twinned with:

- Alassio in Italy
- Laigueglia in Italy
