= Arinsal =

Village in La Massana, Andorra

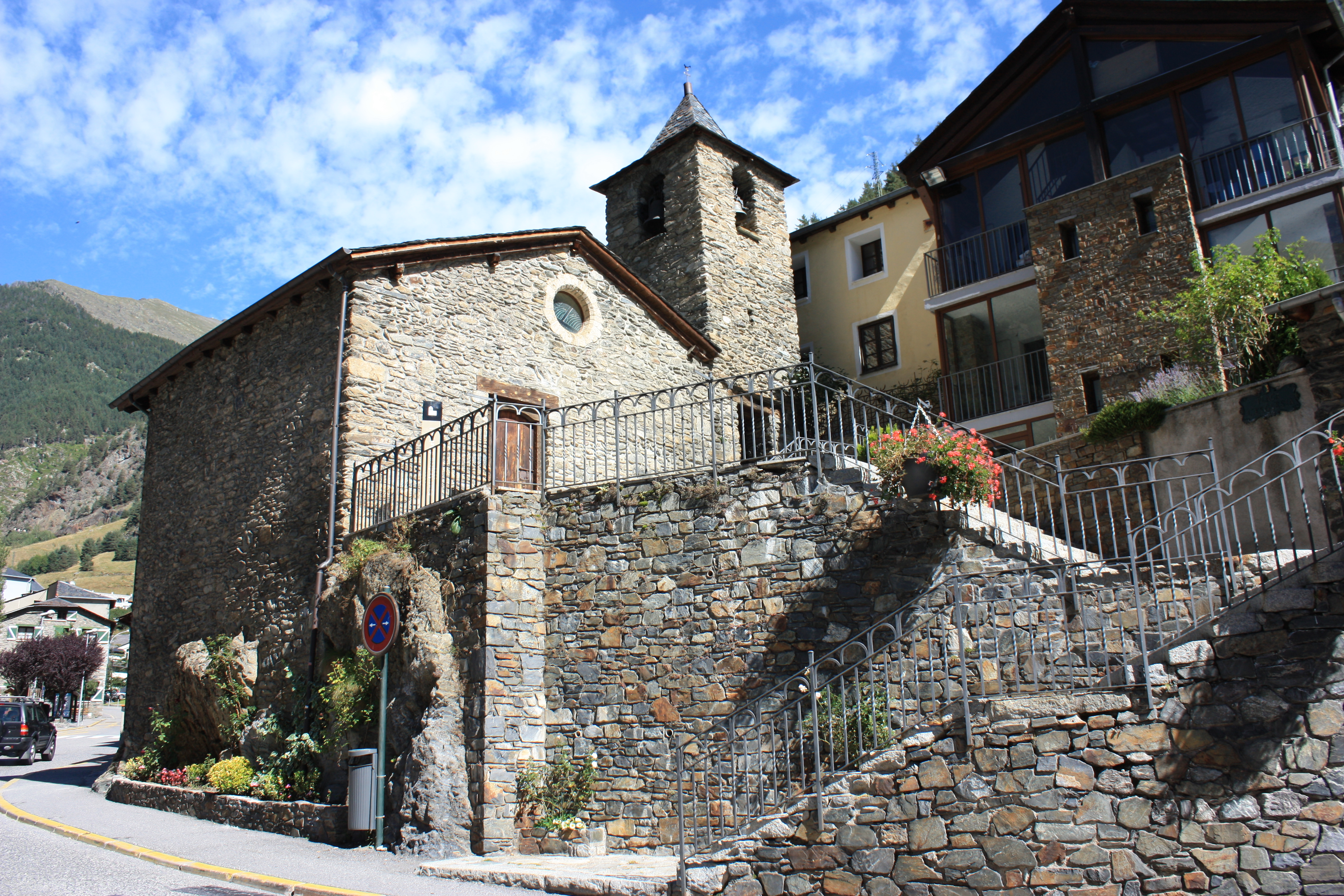

- Location in Andorra
- Coordinates: 42°34′N 1°29′E
- Country: Andorra
- Parish: La Massana
- Elevation: 1,467 m (4,813 ft)

Population (2012)
  - Total: 1,722

Arinsal (Catalan pronunciation: [aɾinˈzal]) is a village in Andorra, set at an altitude of between 1550 and 2560 metres, close to the border with Spain at Tor, Pallars. In the summer Arinsal is home to walkers and bikers, as well as those who just want to relax in the mountain scenery. In the winter, it offers skiing and snowboarding for beginners, as well as a good selection of runs for intermediates.

== Overview ==
The first ski lifts were installed in Arinsal in 1973 by Josep Serra, but the ski area was then taken over by the Comú of La Massana soon after. Over the years following, the ski areas of Pal and Ordino-Arcalis were developed. In 2001, the resorts of Pal and Arinsal were linked by a cablecar for the first time, and then in 2004, the area of Vallnord was created comprising three ski resorts: Arinsal, Pal, and Ordino-Arcalis, all covered under the same Vallnord lift pass. Although the skiing in Andorra is split between Vallnord and Grandvalira, the association of Ski Andorra brings information together and works on initiatives to promote skiing in Andorra.

In the summer months the ski resort in Arinsal transforms into the Vallnord Bike Park. This is one of the largest bike resorts in southern Europe and is made up of both cross country and downhill circuits. The downhill trails in the Vallnord Bike Park cover a wide range of terrain and cater for different abilities. The difficulty of the runs is broken down into 2 easy runs, 6 medium runs, 7 difficult and 2 very difficult runs.

=== Heliport ===
There are two heliports in the area — one in La Massana town (the Heliport Terra Guindaldes) and one in Arinsal, both providing commercial helicopter services. In addition, there is a heliport in the capital, Andorra la Vella Heliport. There are no scheduled passenger flights to these heliports, but it is possible to book taxi flights from Barcelona, Lleida, Perpignan, or Toulouse airports for fixed prices. There is no airport in Andorra. The nearest one is Andorra–La Seu d'Urgell Airport in Spain around 12 km from the border.

== See also ==
- Vallnord
