= Pal, Andorra =

Village in La Massana, Andorra

Pal
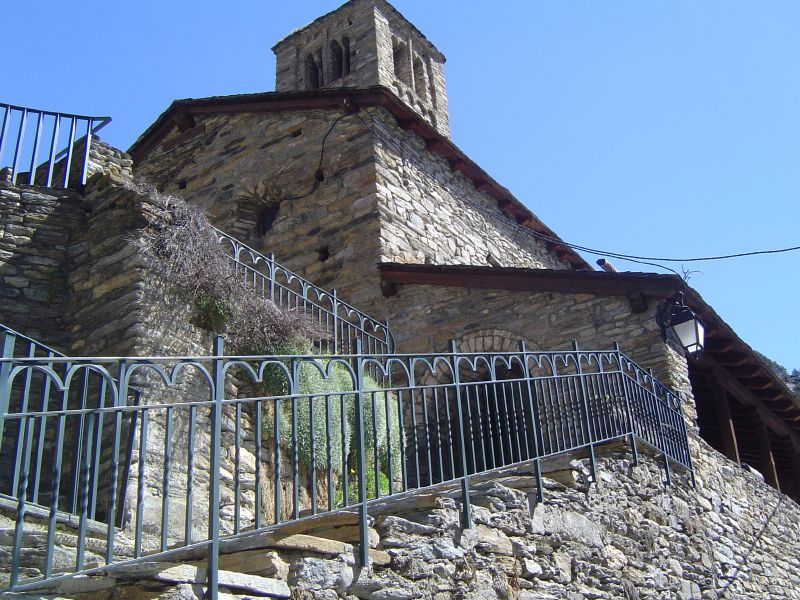
- Església de Sant Climent de Pal

- Location in Andorra
- Coordinates: 42°33′N 1°29′E
- Country: Andorra
- Parish: La Massana
- Elevation: 1,707 m (5,600 ft)

Population (2013)
  - Total: 235

Pal (Catalan pronunciation: [ˈpal]) is a village in Andorra, located in the parish of La Massana 4 km west of the town of La Massana, close to the border with Spain at Tor, Pallars. Its population, as of 2013, was of 235.

== Overview ==
It is situated at an altitude of 1,551 m (5,089 ft). The village church Església de Sant Climent de Pal, of the 11th century and in Romanesque style, is dedicated to Saint Clement of Rome. It has a rectangular bell tower decorated with mullioned windows. Above the town, in the forest of Pal, the Pal ski resort was inaugurated in 1982, now grouped with the Arinsal ski area forming the Vallnord.
