= 2025 UCI Mountain Bike World Cup =

Series of races for all-terrain bicyclists

- Thirty-sixth edition of the UCI Mountain Bike World Cup

Details
- Dates: April–October 2025
- Races: 10 (XCO); 10 (DHI)

Champions
- Male individual champion: (United States) Christopher Blevins (XCO) (Canada) Jackson Goldstone (DH)
- Female individual champion: (New Zealand) Sammie Maxwell (XCO) (Austria) Valentina Höll (DH)

The 2025 UCI Mountain Bike World Cup is a series of races in Olympic Cross-Country (XCO), Cross-Country Eliminator (XCE), and Downhill (DHI). Each discipline has an Elite Men and an Elite Women category. There are also under-23 categories in the XCO and junior categories in the DHI. The series has eight rounds both cross-country and downhill, some of which are held concurrently. In 2023, enduro was added to the UCI World Cup series.

== Cross-country ==
=== Elite ===
Date	Venue	Podium (Men)	Podium (Women)
6 April	(Brazil) Araxá	Victor Koretzky (FRA)	Sammie Maxwell (NZL)
6 April	(Brazil) Araxá	Christopher Blevins (USA)	Nicole Koller (SUI)
6 April	(Brazil) Araxá	Martín Vidaurre (CHL)	Savilia Blunk (USA)
12 April	(Brazil) Araxá	Christopher Blevins (USA)	Jenny Rissveds (SWE)
12 April	(Brazil) Araxá	Martín Vidaurre (CHL)	Sammie Maxwell (NZL)
12 April	(Brazil) Araxá	Adrien Boichis (FRA)	Evie Richards (GBR)
25 May	(Czech Republic) Nové Město na Moravě	Christopher Blevins (USA)	Mona Mitterwallner (AUT)
25 May	(Czech Republic) Nové Město na Moravě	Mathis Azzaro (FRA)	Sammie Maxwell (NZL)
25 May	(Czech Republic) Nové Město na Moravě	Lars Forster (SUI)	Candice Lill (RSA)
8 June	(Austria) Saalfelden–Leogang	Ondřej Cink (CZE)	Puck Pieterse (NED)
8 June	(Austria) Saalfelden–Leogang	Mathias Flückiger (SUI)	Sammie Maxwell (NZL)
8 June	(Austria) Saalfelden–Leogang	Fabio Püntener (SUI)	Ramona Forchini (SUI)
22 June	(Italy) Val di Sole	Martín Vidaurre (CHL)	Puck Pieterse (NED)
22 June	(Italy) Val di Sole	Mathis Azzaro (FRA)	Sammie Maxwell (NZL)
22 June	(Italy) Val di Sole	Fabio Püntener (SUI)	Laura Stigger (AUT)
13 July	(Andorra) Pal–Arinsal	Tom Pidcock (GBR)	Sammie Maxwell (NZL)
13 July	(Andorra) Pal–Arinsal	Luca Martin (FRA)	Alessandra Keller (SUI)
13 July	(Andorra) Pal–Arinsal	Charlie Aldridge (GBR)	Jenny Rissveds (SWE)
31 August	(France) Les Gets	Luca Martin (FRA)	Jenny Rissveds (SWE)
31 August	(France) Les Gets	Luca Braidot (ITA)	Alessandra Keller (SUI)
31 August	(France) Les Gets	Mathias Flückiger (SUI)	Sammie Maxwell (NZL)
21 September	(Switzerland) Lenzerheide	Alan Hatherly (RSA)	Alessandra Keller (SUI)
21 September	(Switzerland) Lenzerheide	Charlie Aldridge (GBR)	Jenny Rissveds (SWE)
21 September	(Switzerland) Lenzerheide	Adrien Boichis (FRA)	Savilia Blunk (USA)
5 October	(United States) Lake Placid	Christopher Blevins (USA)	Jenny Rissveds (SWE)
5 October	(United States) Lake Placid	Adrien Boichis (FRA)	Evie Richards (GBR)
5 October	(United States) Lake Placid	Mathis Azzaro (FRA)	Sammie Maxwell (NZL)
12 October	(Canada) Mont-Sainte-Anne	Charlie Aldridge (GBR)	Jenny Rissveds (SWE)
12 October	(Canada) Mont-Sainte-Anne	Martín Vidaurre (CHL)	Sammie Maxwell (NZL)
12 October	(Canada) Mont-Sainte-Anne	Mathis Azzaro (FRA)	Evie Richards (GBR)

=== Under 23 ===
Date	Venue	Podium (Men)	Podium (Women)
6 April	(Brazil) Araxá	Finn Treudler (SUI)	Isabella Holmgren (CAN)
6 April	(Brazil) Araxá	Gustav Heby Pedersen (DEN)	Ella MacPhee (CAN)
6 April	(Brazil) Araxá	Nikolaj Hougs (DEN)	Valentina Corvi (ITA)
12 April	(Brazil) Araxá	Finn Treudler (SUI)	Isabella Holmgren (CAN)
12 April	(Brazil) Araxá	William Handley (NOR)	Valentina Corvi (ITA)
12 April	(Brazil) Araxá	Elian Paccagnella (ITA)	Ella MacPhee (CAN)
25 May	(Czech Republic) Nové Město na Moravě	Paul Schehl (GER)	Ella MacPhee (CAN)
25 May	(Czech Republic) Nové Město na Moravě	Rens Teunissen van Manen (NED)	Fiona Schibler (SUI)
25 May	(Czech Republic) Nové Město na Moravě	Finn Treudler (SUI)	Sara Cortinovis (ITA)
8 June	(Austria) Saalfelden–Leogang	Finn Treudler (SUI)	Fiona Schibler (SUI)
8 June	(Austria) Saalfelden–Leogang	Paul Schehl (GER)	Monique Halter (SUI)
8 June	(Austria) Saalfelden–Leogang	Nicolas Halter (SUI)	Elina Benoit (SUI)
22 June	(Italy) Val di Sole	Rens Teunissen van Manen (NED)	Valentina Corvi (ITA)
22 June	(Italy) Val di Sole	Finn Treudler (SUI)	Fiona Schibler (SUI)
22 June	(Italy) Val di Sole	Benjamin Krüger (GER)	Sara Cortinovis (ITA)
13 July	(Andorra) Pal–Arinsal	Finn Treudler (SUI)	Valentina Corvi (ITA)
13 July	(Andorra) Pal–Arinsal	Nicolas Halter (SUI)	Monique Halter (SUI)
13 July	(Andorra) Pal–Arinsal	Maxime L'Homme (SUI)	Sina van Thiel (GER)
31 August	(France) Les Gets	Finn Treudler (SUI)	Valentina Corvi (ITA)
31 August	(France) Les Gets	Benjamin Krüger (GER)	Vida Lopez (USA)
31 August	(France) Les Gets	Alix André-Gallis (FRA)	Isabella Holmgren (CAN)
21 September	(Switzerland) Lenzerheide	Finn Treudler (SUI)	Vida Lopez (USA)
21 September	(Switzerland) Lenzerheide	Rens Teunissen van Manen (NED)	Valentina Corvi (ITA)
21 September	(Switzerland) Lenzerheide	Gustav Heby Pedersen (DEN)	Sara Cortinovis (ITA)
5 October	(United States) Lake Placid	Finn Treudler (SUI)	Vida Lopez (USA)
5 October	(United States) Lake Placid	Thibaut François (ESP)	Sara Cortinovis (ITA)
5 October	(United States) Lake Placid	Rens Teunissen van Manen (NED)	Valentina Corvi (ITA)
12 October	(Canada) Mont-Sainte-Anne	Finn Treudler (SUI)	Isabella Holmgren (CAN)
12 October	(Canada) Mont-Sainte-Anne	Gustav Heby Pedersen (DEN)	Vida Lopez (USA)
12 October	(Canada) Mont-Sainte-Anne	Naël Rouffiac (FRA)	Valentina Corvi (ITA)

== Cross-country short track ==
=== Elite ===
Date	Venue	Podium (Men)	Podium (Women)
5 April	(Brazil) Araxá	Christopher Blevins (USA)	Evie Richards (GBR)
5 April	(Brazil) Araxá	Victor Koretzky (FRA)	Sammie Maxwell (NZL)
5 April	(Brazil) Araxá	Mathis Azzaro (FRA)	Alessandra Keller (SUI)
11 April	(Brazil) Araxá	Christopher Blevins (USA)	Evie Richards (GBR)
11 April	(Brazil) Araxá	Victor Koretzky (FRA)	Nicole Koller (SUI)
11 April	(Brazil) Araxá	Nino Schurter (SUI)	Jenny Rissveds (SWE)
24 May	(Czech Republic) Nové Město na Moravě	Christopher Blevins (USA)	Puck Pieterse (NED)
24 May	(Czech Republic) Nové Město na Moravě	Victor Koretzky (FRA)	Evie Richards (GBR)
24 May	(Czech Republic) Nové Město na Moravě	Filippo Colombo (SUI)	Linda Indergand (SUI)
6 June	(Austria) Saalfelden–Leogang	Christopher Blevins (USA)	Puck Pieterse (NED)
6 June	(Austria) Saalfelden–Leogang	Martín Vidaurre (CHL)	Sammie Maxwell (NZL)
6 June	(Austria) Saalfelden–Leogang	Charlie Aldridge (GBR)	Nicole Koller (SUI)
20 June	(Italy) Val di Sole	Christopher Blevins (USA)	Puck Pieterse (NED)
20 June	(Italy) Val di Sole	Victor Koretzky (FRA)	Jenny Rissveds (SWE)
20 June	(Italy) Val di Sole	Luca Schwarzbauer (GER)	Laura Stigger (AUT)
11 July	(Andorra) Pal–Arinsal	Luca Martin (FRA)	Alessandra Keller (SUI)
11 July	(Andorra) Pal–Arinsal	Christopher Blevins (USA)	Evie Richards (GBR)
11 July	(Andorra) Pal–Arinsal	Mathis Azzaro (FRA)	Ronja Blöchlinger (SUI)
29 August	(France) Les Gets	Charlie Aldridge (GBR)	Jenny Rissveds (SWE)
29 August	(France) Les Gets	Luca Martin (FRA)	Alessandra Keller (SUI)
29 August	(France) Les Gets	Luca Braidot (ITA)	Sammie Maxwell (NZL)
19 September	(Switzerland) Lenzerheide	Victor Koretzky (FRA)	Jenny Rissveds (SWE)
19 September	(Switzerland) Lenzerheide	Adrien Boichis (FRA)	Evie Richards (GBR)
19 September	(Switzerland) Lenzerheide	Simon Andreassen (DEN)	Ronja Blöchlinger (SUI)
3 October	(United States) Lake Placid	Christopher Blevins (USA)	Jenny Rissveds (SWE)
3 October	(United States) Lake Placid	Adrien Boichis (FRA)	Evie Richards (GBR)
3 October	(United States) Lake Placid	Mathis Azzaro (FRA)	Alessandra Keller (SUI)
10 October	(Canada) Mont-Sainte-Anne	Luca Martin (FRA)	Jenny Rissveds (SWE)
10 October	(Canada) Mont-Sainte-Anne	Charlie Aldridge (GBR)	Evie Richards (GBR)
10 October	(Canada) Mont-Sainte-Anne	Adrien Boichis (FRA)	Ronja Blöchlinger (SUI)

=== Under 23 ===
Date	Venue	Podium (Men)	Podium (Women)
5 April	(Brazil) Araxá	Sondre Rokke (NOR)	Isabella Holmgren (CAN)
5 April	(Brazil) Araxá	Brayden Johnson (USA)	Katharina Sadnik (AUT)
5 April	(Brazil) Araxá	Gustav Heby Pedersen (DEN)	Ella Maclean-Howell (GBR)
11 April	(Brazil) Araxá	Elian Paccagnella (ITA)	Isabella Holmgren (CAN)
11 April	(Brazil) Araxá	Finn Treudler (SUI)	Valentina Corvi (ITA)
11 April	(Brazil) Araxá	Gustav Heby Pedersen (DEN)	Katharina Sadnik (AUT)
24 May	(Czech Republic) Nové Město na Moravě	Gustav Heby Pedersen (DEN)	Ava Holmgren (CAN)
24 May	(Czech Republic) Nové Město na Moravě	Sondre Rokke (NOR)	Isabella Holmgren (CAN)
24 May	(Czech Republic) Nové Město na Moravě	Elian Paccagnella (ITA)	Ella MacPhee (CAN)
6 June	(Austria) Saalfelden–Leogang	Finn Treudler (SUI)	Elina Benoit (SUI)
6 June	(Austria) Saalfelden–Leogang	Oleksandr Hudyma (UKR)	Vida Lopez (USA)
6 June	(Austria) Saalfelden–Leogang	Paul Schehl (GER)	Ella MacPhee (CAN)
20 June	(Italy) Val di Sole	Finn Treudler (SUI)	Nicole Bradbury (CAN)
20 June	(Italy) Val di Sole	Rens Teunissen van Manen (NED)	Katharina Sadnik (AUT)
20 June	(Italy) Val di Sole	Paul Schehl (GER)	Katrin Embacher (AUT)
11 July	(Andorra) Pal–Arinsal	Finn Treudler (SUI)	Katharina Sadnik (AUT)
11 July	(Andorra) Pal–Arinsal	Gustav Heby Pedersen (DEN)	Valentina Corvi (ITA)
11 July	(Andorra) Pal–Arinsal	Nicolas Halter (SUI)	Sina van Thiel (GER)
29 August	(France) Les Gets	Finn Treudler (SUI)	Vida Lopez (USA)
29 August	(France) Les Gets	Benjamin Krüger (GER)	Valentina Corvi (ITA)
29 August	(France) Les Gets	Gustav Heby Pedersen (DEN)	Olivia Onesti (FRA)
19 September	(Switzerland) Lenzerheide	Finn Treudler (SUI)	Valentina Corvi (ITA)
19 September	(Switzerland) Lenzerheide	Paul Schehl (GER)	Vida Lopez (USA)
19 September	(Switzerland) Lenzerheide	Gustav Heby Pedersen (DEN)	Katharina Sadnik (AUT)
3 October	(United States) Lake Placid	Finn Treudler (SUI)	Tyler Jacobs (RSA)
3 October	(United States) Lake Placid	Paul Schehl (GER)	Line Burquier (FRA)
3 October	(United States) Lake Placid	Gustav Heby Pedersen (DEN)	Anina Hutter (SUI)
10 October	(Canada) Mont-Sainte-Anne	Finn Treudler (SUI)	Isabella Holmgren (CAN)
10 October	(Canada) Mont-Sainte-Anne	Gustav Heby Pedersen (DEN)	Anina Hutter (SUI)
10 October	(Canada) Mont-Sainte-Anne	Nils Johansson (SWE)	Katharina Sadnik (AUT)

== Downhill ==
=== Elite ===
Date	Venue	Podium (Men)	Podium (Women)
18 May	(Poland) Bielsko-Biała	Loïc Bruni (FRA)	Tahnée Seagrave (GBR)
18 May	(Poland) Bielsko-Biała	Oisin O'Callaghan (IRE)	Anna Newkirk (USA)
18 May	(Poland) Bielsko-Biała	Amaury Pierron (FRA)	Nina Hoffmann (GER)
1 June	(France) Loudenvielle–Peyragudes	Jackson Goldstone (CAN)	Gracey Hemstreet (CAN)
1 June	(France) Loudenvielle–Peyragudes	Amaury Pierron (FRA)	Valentina Höll (AUT)
1 June	(France) Loudenvielle–Peyragudes	Jordan Williams (GBR)	Tahnée Seagrave (GBR)
7 June	(Austria) Saalfelden–Leogang	Jackson Goldstone (CAN)	Gracey Hemstreet (CAN)
7 June	(Austria) Saalfelden–Leogang	Loïc Bruni (FRA)	Anna Newkirk (USA)
7 June	(Austria) Saalfelden–Leogang	Henri Kiefer (GER)	Valentina Höll (AUT)
21 June	(Italy) Val di Sole	Jackson Goldstone (CAN)	Marine Cabirou (FRA)
21 June	(Italy) Val di Sole	Troy Brosnan (AUS)	Valentina Höll (AUT)
21 June	(Italy) Val di Sole	Thibaut Dapréla (FRA)	Monika Hrastnik (SLO)
6 July	(Italy) La Thuile	Jackson Goldstone (CAN)	Nina Hoffmann (GER)
6 July	(Italy) La Thuile	Loris Vergier (FRA)	Valentina Höll (AUT)
6 July	(Italy) La Thuile	Loïc Bruni (FRA)	Gracey Hemstreet (CAN)
12 July	(Andorra) Pal–Arinsal	Loïc Bruni (FRA)	Tahnée Seagrave (GBR)
12 July	(Andorra) Pal–Arinsal	Jackson Goldstone (CAN)	Valentina Höll (AUT)
12 July	(Andorra) Pal–Arinsal	Loris Vergier (FRA)	Mille Johnset (NOR)
30 August	(France) Les Gets	Ronan Dunne (IRE)	Gracey Hemstreet (CAN)
30 August	(France) Les Gets	Martin Maes (BEL)	Marine Cabirou (FRA)
30 August	(France) Les Gets	Andreas Kolb (AUT)	Valentina Höll (AUT)
20 September	(Switzerland) Lenzerheide	Amaury Pierron (FRA)	Tahnée Seagrave (GBR)
20 September	(Switzerland) Lenzerheide	Henri Kiefer (GER)	Nina Hoffmann (GER)
20 September	(Switzerland) Lenzerheide	Lachlan Stevens-McNab (NZL)	Valentina Höll (AUT)
4 October	(United States) Lake Placid	Luke Meier-Smith (AUS)	Valentina Höll (AUT)
4 October	(United States) Lake Placid	Luca Shaw (USA)	Myriam Nicole (FRA)
4 October	(United States) Lake Placid	Henri Kiefer (GER)	Sacha Earnest (NZL)
11 October	(Canada) Mont-Sainte-Anne	Jackson Goldstone (CAN)	Marine Cabirou (FRA)
11 October	(Canada) Mont-Sainte-Anne	Luca Shaw (USA)	Nina Hoffmann (GER)
11 October	(Canada) Mont-Sainte-Anne	Andreas Kolb (AUT)	Myriam Nicole (FRA)

=== Junior ===
Date	Venue	Podium (Men)	Podium (Women)
18 May	(Poland) Bielsko-Biała	Max Alran (FRA)	Rosa Marie Jensen (DEN)
18 May	(Poland) Bielsko-Biała	Tyler Waite (NZL)	Lina Frener (AUT)
18 May	(Poland) Bielsko-Biała	Oli Clark (NZL)	Ellie Hulsebosch (NZL)
1 June	(France) Loudenvielle–Peyragudes	Bode Burke (USA)	Lina Frener (AUT)
1 June	(France) Loudenvielle–Peyragudes	Tyler Waite (NZL)	Rosa Zierl (AUT)
1 June	(France) Loudenvielle–Peyragudes	Max Alran (FRA)	Matilda Melton (USA)
7 June	(Austria) Saalfelden–Leogang	Oli Clark (NZL)	Rosa Zierl (AUT)
7 June	(Austria) Saalfelden–Leogang	Max Alran (FRA)	Aletha Ostgaard (USA)
7 June	(Austria) Saalfelden–Leogang	Asa Vermette (USA)	Ellie Hulsebosch (NZL)
21 June	(Italy) Val di Sole	Till Alran (FRA)	Rosa Zierl (AUT)
21 June	(Italy) Val di Sole	Max Alran (FRA)	Aletha Ostgaard (USA)
21 June	(Italy) Val di Sole	Asa Vermette (USA)	Kate Hastings (NZL)
6 July	(Italy) La Thuile	Till Alran (FRA)	Aletha Ostgaard (USA)
6 July	(Italy) La Thuile	Asa Vermette (USA)	Rosa Zierl (AUT)
6 July	(Italy) La Thuile	Tyler Waite (NZL)	Matilda Melton (USA)
12 July	(Andorra) Pal–Arinsal	Max Alran (FRA)	Aletha Ostgaard (USA)
12 July	(Andorra) Pal–Arinsal	Asa Vermette (USA)	Rosa Marie Jensen (DEN)
12 July	(Andorra) Pal–Arinsal	Tyler Waite (NZL)	Rosa Zierl (AUT)
30 August	(France) Les Gets	Max Alran (FRA)	Rosa Zierl (AUT)
30 August	(France) Les Gets	Asa Vermette (USA)	Aletha Ostgaard (USA)
30 August	(France) Les Gets	Tyler Waite (NZL)	Cassandre Peizerat (FRA)
20 September	(Switzerland) Lenzerheide	Asa Vermette (USA)	Rosa Zierl (AUT)
20 September	(Switzerland) Lenzerheide	Jonty Williamson (NZL)	Aletha Ostgaard (USA)
20 September	(Switzerland) Lenzerheide	Oli Clark (NZL)	Rosa Marie Jensen (DEN)
5 October	(United States) Lake Placid	Max Alran (FRA)	Aletha Ostgaard (USA)
5 October	(United States) Lake Placid	Asa Vermette (USA)	Matilda Melton (USA)
5 October	(United States) Lake Placid	Tyler Waite (NZL)	Ellie Hulsebosch (NZL)
11 October	(Canada) Mont-Sainte-Anne	Asa Vermette (USA)	Aletha Ostgaard (USA)
11 October	(Canada) Mont-Sainte-Anne	Tyler Waite (NZL)	Ellie Hulsebosch (NZL)
11 October	(Canada) Mont-Sainte-Anne	Jonty Williamson (NZL)	Rosa Zierl (AUT)

== Cross-country eliminator ==
Date	Venue	Podium (Men)	Podium (Women)
13 April	(Tajikistan) Dushanbe	Jakob Klemenčič (SLO)	Mariia Sukhopalova (UKR)
13 April	(Tajikistan) Dushanbe	Edvin Lindh (SWE)	Marion Fromberger (GER)
13 April	(Tajikistan) Dushanbe	Simon Gegenheimer (GER)	Madison Boissière (FRA)
1 June	(Belgium) Leuven	Jeroen van Eck (NED)	Gaia Tormena (ITA)
1 June	(Belgium) Leuven	Louis Krauss (GER)	Marion Fromberger (GER)
1 June	(Belgium) Leuven	Jakob Klemenčič (SLO)	Madison Boissière (FRA)
12 July	(Germany) Aalen	Jakob Klemenčič (SLO)	Marion Fromberger (GER)
12 July	(Germany) Aalen	Simon Gegenheimer (GER)	Adéla Pernická (CZE)
12 July	(Germany) Aalen	Jeroen van Eck (NED)	Lina Huber (GER)
10 August	(Turkey) Sakarya	Lorenzo Serres (FRA)	Marion Fromberger (GER)
10 August	(Turkey) Sakarya	Simon Gegenheimer (GER)	Mariia Sukhopalova (UKR)
10 August	(Turkey) Sakarya	Jakob Klemenčič (SLO)	Adéla Pernická (CZE)
17 August	(Brazil) São Paulo	Edvin Lindh (SWE)	Mariia Sukhopalova (UKR)
17 August	(Brazil) São Paulo	Luiz Cocuzzi (BRA)	Marion Fromberger (GER)
17 August	(Brazil) São Paulo	Jeroen van Eck (NED)	Marcela Lima (BRA)
11 October	(Spain) Barcelona	Lorenzo Serres (FRA)	Gaia Tormena (ITA)
11 October	(Spain) Barcelona	Louis Krauss (GER)	Marion Fromberger (GER)
11 October	(Spain) Barcelona	Simon Gegenheimer (GER)	Mariia Sukhopalova (UKR)

== E-MTB cross-country ==
Date	Venue	Podium (Men)	Podium (Women)
14 June	(Romania) Cheile Grădiștei	Mirko Tabacchi (ITA)	Anna Spielmann (AUT)
14 June	(Romania) Cheile Grădiștei	Andrea Garibbo (ITA)	Sofia Wiedenroth (GER)
14 June	(Romania) Cheile Grădiștei	Théo Charmes (FRA)	Giulia Bertoni (ITA)
15 June	(Romania) Cheile Grădiștei	Théo Charmes (FRA)	Anna Spielmann (AUT)
15 June	(Romania) Cheile Grădiștei	Adrián Cuéllar (ESP)	Sofia Wiedenroth (GER)
15 June	(Romania) Cheile Grădiștei	Mirko Tabacchi (ITA)	Giulia Bertoni (ITA)
26 July	Monaco–Alpes-Maritimes	Jérôme Gilloux (FRA)	Sofia Wiedenroth (GER)
26 July	Monaco–Alpes-Maritimes	Mirko Tabacchi (ITA)	Nathalie Schneitter (SUI)
26 July	Monaco–Alpes-Maritimes	Cristian Bernardi (ITA)	Giulia Bertoni (ITA)
27 July	Monaco–Alpes-Maritimes	Jérôme Gilloux (FRA)	Sofia Wiedenroth (GER)
27 July	Monaco–Alpes-Maritimes	Théo Charmes (FRA)	Nathalie Schneitter (SUI)
27 July	Monaco–Alpes-Maritimes	Mirko Tabacchi (ITA)	Giulia Bertoni (ITA)
4 October	(Italy) Olbia	Joris Ryf (SUI)	Anna Spielmann (AUT)
4 October	(Italy) Olbia	Mirko Tabacchi (ITA)	Sofia Wiedenroth (GER)
4 October	(Italy) Olbia	Lukas Dennda (SUI)	Kathrin Stirnemann (SUI)
5 October	(Italy) Olbia	Joris Ryf (SUI)	Kathrin Stirnemann (SUI)
5 October	(Italy) Olbia	Adrián Cuéllar (ESP)	Sofia Wiedenroth (GER)
5 October	(Italy) Olbia	Théo Charmes (FRA)	Anna Spielmann (AUT)
11 October	(Italy) Massa Marittima	Joris Ryf (SUI)	Kathrin Stirnemann (SUI)
11 October	(Italy) Massa Marittima	Adrián Cuéllar (ESP)	Anna Spielmann (AUT)
11 October	(Italy) Massa Marittima	Mirko Tabacchi (ITA)	Sofia Wiedenroth (GER)

== Enduro ==
In enduro races, the downhills are timed and the uphills are mandatory but not timed.

=== Elite ===
Date	Venue	Podium (Men)	Podium (Women)
10–11 May	(Italy) Finale Outdoor Region	Daniel Booker (AUS)	Harriet Harnden (GBR)
10–11 May	(Italy) Finale Outdoor Region	Sławomir Łukasik (POL)	Ella Conolly (GBR)
10–11 May	(Italy) Finale Outdoor Region	Alex Rudeau (FRA)	Morgane Charre (FRA)
17 May	(Poland) Bielsko-Biała	Sławomir Łukasik (POL)	Elly Hoskin (CAN)
17 May	(Poland) Bielsko-Biała	Jack Moir (AUS)	Ella Conolly (GBR)
17 May	(Poland) Bielsko-Biała	Gregory Callaghan (IRL)	Morgane Charre (FRA)
31 May	(France) Loudenvielle–Peyragudes	Daniel Booker (AUS)	Ella Conolly (GBR)
31 May	(France) Loudenvielle–Peyragudes	Alex Rudeau (FRA)	Morgane Charre (FRA)
31 May	(France) Loudenvielle–Peyragudes	Sławomir Łukasik (POL)	Winnifred Goldsbury (NZL)
8 June	(Austria) Saalfelden–Leogang	Jesse Melamed (CAN)	Ella Conolly (GBR)
8 June	(Austria) Saalfelden–Leogang	Charles Murray (NZL)	Simona Kuchyňková (SVK)
8 June	(Austria) Saalfelden–Leogang	Sławomir Łukasik (POL)	Winnifred Goldsbury (NZL)
28–29 June	(Italy) Val di Fassa	Sławomir Łukasik (POL)	Ella Conolly (GBR)
28–29 June	(Italy) Val di Fassa	Richard Rude Jr. (USA)	Nadine Ellecosta (ITA)
28–29 June	(Italy) Val di Fassa	Jesse Melamed (CAN)	Simona Kuchyňková (SVK)
5 July	(Italy) La Thuile	Sławomir Łukasik (POL)	Simona Kuchyňková (SVK)
5 July	(Italy) La Thuile	Charles Murray (NZL)	Ella Conolly (GBR)
5 July	(Italy) La Thuile	Jesse Melamed (CAN)	Mélanie Pugin (FRA)
23–24 August	(France) Morillon	Alex Rudeau (FRA)	Elly Hoskin (CAN)
23–24 August	(France) Morillon	Jesse Melamed (CAN)	Raphaela Richter (GER)
23–24 August	(France) Morillon	Lief Rodgers (CAN)	Simona Kuchyňková (SVK)

=== Junior ===
Date	Venue	Podium (Men)	Podium (Women)
10–11 May	(Italy) Finale Outdoor Region	Melvin Almueis (FRA)	Lucile Metge (FRA)
10–11 May	(Italy) Finale Outdoor Region	Cooper Millwood (NZL)	Lacey Adams (AUS)
10–11 May	(Italy) Finale Outdoor Region	Matteo Falcini (ITA)	Chloe Bear (USA)
17 May	(Poland) Bielsko-Biała	Tommy Bougon (FRA)	Nežka Libnik (SLO)
17 May	(Poland) Bielsko-Biała	Melvin Almueis (FRA)	Lacey Adams (AUS)
17 May	(Poland) Bielsko-Biała	Cooper Millwood (NZL)	Chloe Bear (USA)
31 May	(France) Loudenvielle–Peyragudes	Melvin Almueis (FRA)	Lacey Adams (AUS)
31 May	(France) Loudenvielle–Peyragudes	Cooper Millwood (NZL)	Lucile Metge (FRA)
31 May	(France) Loudenvielle–Peyragudes	Gabriel Sainthuile (BEL)	Chloe Bear (USA)
8 June	(Austria) Saalfelden–Leogang	Melvin Almueis (FRA)	Lacey Adams (AUS)
8 June	(Austria) Saalfelden–Leogang	Cooper Millwood (NZL)	Lucile Metge (FRA)
8 June	(Austria) Saalfelden–Leogang	Áron Babó (HUN)	Chloe Bear (USA)
28–29 June	(Italy) Val di Fassa	Melvin Almueis (FRA)	Lacey Adams (AUS)
28–29 June	(Italy) Val di Fassa	Áron Babó (HUN)	Lucile Metge (FRA)
28–29 June	(Italy) Val di Fassa	Rhys Blair (CAN)	Chloe Bear (USA)
5 July	(Italy) La Thuile	Noé Forlin (SUI)	Nežka Libnik (SLO)
5 July	(Italy) La Thuile	Gabriel Sainthuile (BEL)	Lucile Metge (FRA)
5 July	(Italy) La Thuile	Rhys Blair (CAN)	Lacey Adams (AUS)
23–24 August	(France) Morillon	Melvin Almueis (FRA)	Elise Porta (FRA)
23–24 August	(France) Morillon	Hugo Marti (FRA)	Chloe Bear (USA)
23–24 August	(France) Morillon	Áron Babó (HUN)	Lacey Adams (AUS)

== Marathon ==
Date	Venue	Podium (Men)	Podium (Women)
10 May	(Italy) Capoliveri	Wout Alleman (BEL)	Rosa van Doorn (NED)
10 May	(Italy) Capoliveri	Gioele De Cosmo (ITA)	Lejla Njemčević (BIH)
10 May	(Italy) Capoliveri	Fabian Rabensteiner (ITA)	Adelheid Morath (GER)
1 June	Andorra	Héctor Leonardo Páez (COL)	Rosa van Doorn (NED)
1 June	Andorra	Andreas Seewald (GER)	Sandra Mairhofer (ITA)
1 June	Andorra	Wout Alleman (BEL)	Vera Looser (NAM)
14 June	(Italy) Selva Val Gardena	Andreas Seewald (GER)	Sandra Mairhofer (ITA)
14 June	(Italy) Selva Val Gardena	Héctor Leonardo Páez (COL)	Mara Fumagalli (ITA)
14 June	(Italy) Selva Val Gardena	Andrea Siffredi (ITA)	Paula Gorycka (POL)
13 July	(Germany) Kirchzarten	Andreas Seewald (GER)	Rosa van Doorn (NED)
13 July	(Germany) Kirchzarten	Gioele De Cosmo (ITA)	Mara Fumagalli (ITA)
13 July	(Germany) Kirchzarten	Wout Alleman (BEL)	Adelheid Morath (GER)
21 September	(Spain) Girona/Costa Brava	Casey South (SUI)	Paula Gorycka (POL)
21 September	(Spain) Girona/Costa Brava	Samuele Porro (ITA)	Rosa van Doorn (NED)
21 September	(Spain) Girona/Costa Brava	Marc Stutzmann (SUI)	Amanda Bohlin (SWE)

== World Cup standings ==
bold denotes race winners.

=== Cross-country ===
==== Men's ====
**Top 5 men's elite standings**
Rank	Rider	BRA (Brazil)	BRA (Brazil)	CZE (Czech Republic)	AUT (Austria)	ITA (Italy)	AND (Andorra)	FRA (France)	SUI (Switzerland)	USA (United States)	CAN (Canada)	Total Points
1	(United States) **Christopher Blevins**	280	**330**	**330**	152	190	113	111	69	**330**	91	**1996**
2	(Chile) Martín Vidaurre	189	231	146	123	**263**	130	63	140	177	233	**1695**
3	(France) Luca Martin	48	100	111	135	121	**280**	**315**	130	148	158	**1546**
4	(France) Mathis Azzaro	50	0	200	187	200	200	148	36	210	198	**1429**
5	(United Kingdom) Charlie Aldridge	34	38	66	74	168	191	120	225	136	**315**	**1367**

**Top 5 men's under 23 standings**
Rank	Rider	BRA (Brazil)	BRA (Brazil)	CZE (Czech Republic)	AUT (Austria)	ITA (Italy)	AND (Andorra)	FRA (France)	SUI (Switzerland)	USA (United States)	CAN (Canada)	Total Points
1	(Switzerland) **Finn Treudler**	**145**	**155**	80	**165**	140	**165**	**165**	**165**	**165**	**165**	**1510**
2	(Netherlands) Rens Teunissen van Manen	88	56	120	87	**155**	69	65	118	100	51	**909**
3	(Denmark) Gustav Heby Pedersen	125	76	105	46	60	90	75	105	95	130	**907**
4	(Germany) Benjamin Krüger	54	90	43	42	92	94	130	81	84	56	**766**
5	(Germany) Paul Schehl	19	0	**143**	125	95	72	52	100	30	73	**709**

==== Women's ====
**Top 5 women's elite standings**
Rank	Rider	BRA (Brazil)	BRA (Brazil)	CZE (Czech Republic)	AUT (Austria)	ITA (Italy)	AND (Andorra)	FRA (France)	SUI (Switzerland)	USA (United States)	CAN (Canada)	Total Points
1	(New Zealand) **Sammie Maxwell**	**315**	235	207	265	231	**282**	210	168	190	238	**2341**
2	(Sweden) Jenny Rissveds	145	**300**	0	125	215	195	**330**	280	**330**	**330**	**2250**
3	(Switzerland) Alessandra Keller	200	98	190	121	79	280	265	**287**	190	180	**1890**
4	(United Kingdom) Evie Richards	170	240	107	117	DNS	195	148	215	265	225	**1682**
5	(Switzerland) Nicole Koller	240	185	147	160	180	178	107	92	120	129	**1538**

**Top 5 women's under 23 standings**
Rank	Rider	BRA (Brazil)	BRA (Brazil)	CZE (Czech Republic)	AUT (Austria)	ITA (Italy)	AND (Andorra)	FRA (France)	SUI (Switzerland)	USA (United States)	CAN (Canada)	Total Points
1	(Italy) **Valentina Corvi**	99	130	DNS	DNS	**143**	**155**	**155**	140	100	97	**1019**
2	(United States) Vida Lopez	DNS	DNS	75	57	79	81	140	**155**	**140**	114	**841**
3	(Canada) Ella MacPhee	120	96	**150**	85	70	70	60	18	75	60	**804**
4	(Italy) Sara Cortinovis	65	89	89	59	99	62	82	80	110	65	**800**
5	(France) Olivia Onesti	70	59	59	86	68	85	100	60	69	76	**732**

=== Cross-country short track ===
==== Elite ====
**Top 5 men's elite standings**
Rank	Rider	BRA (Brazil)	BRA (Brazil)	CZE (Czech Republic)	AUT (Austria)	ITA (Italy)	AND (Andorra)	FRA (France)	SUI (Switzerland)	USA (United States)	CAN (Canada)	Total Points
1	(United States) **Christopher Blevins**	**250**	**250**	**250**	**250**	**250**	200	72	54	**250**	85	**1911**
2	(France) Luca Martin	68	100	52	50	120	**250**	200	150	140	**250**	**1380**
3	(United Kingdom) Charlie Aldridge	100	66	140	160	76	85	**250**	70	120	200	**1267**
4	(France) Victor Koretzky	200	200	200	72	200	0	DNS	**250**	44	56	**1222**
5	(Denmark) Simon Andreassen	130	130	48	40	74	110	130	160	130	120	**1072**

**Top 5 elite standings**
Rank	Rider	BRA (Brazil)	BRA (Brazil)	CZE (Czech Republic)	AUT (Austria)	ITA (Italy)	AND (Andorra)	FRA (France)	SUI (Switzerland)	USA (United States)	CAN (Canada)	Total Points
1	(United Kingdom) **Evie Richards**	**250**	**250**	200	130	DNS	200	140	200	200	200	**1770**
2	(Sweden) Jenny Rissveds	110	160	0	80	200	110	**250**	**250**	**250**	**250**	**1660**
3	(Switzerland) Alessandra Keller	160	120	150	120	130	**250**	200	130	160	150	**1570**
4	(Switzerland) Nicole Koller	150	200	130	160	150	140	74	150	150	100	**1404**
5	(New Zealand) Sammie Maxwell	200	110	34	200	85	90	160	140	80	140	**1239**

==== Under 23 ====
**Top 5 men's under 23 standings**
Rank	Rider	BRA (Brazil)	BRA (Brazil)	CZE (Czech Republic)	AUT (Austria)	ITA (Italy)	AND (Andorra)	FRA (France)	SUI (Switzerland)	USA (United States)	CAN (Canada)	Total Points
1	(Switzerland) **Finn Treudler**	75	100	39	**125**	**125**	**125**	**125**	**125**	**125**	**125**	**1089**
2	(Denmark) Gustav Heby Pedersen	80	80	**125**	47	36	100	80	80	80	100	**808**
3	(Germany) Paul Schehl	70	DNS	65	80	80	75	0	100	100	65	**635**
4	(Netherlands) Rens Teunissen van Manen	65	70	75	49	100	51	51	65	75	0	**601**
5	(Germany) Benjamin Krüger	43	52	32	34	49	70	100	55	70	49	**554**

**Top 5 women's under 23 standings**
Rank	Rider	BRA (Brazil)	BRA (Brazil)	CZE (Czech Republic)	AUT (Austria)	ITA (Italy)	AND (Andorra)	FRA (France)	SUI (Switzerland)	USA (United States)	CAN (Canada)	Total Points
1	(Austria) **Katharina Sadnik**	100	80	70	36	100	**125**	DNS	80	50	80	**721**
2	(Italy) Valentina Corvi	70	100	DNS	DNS	65	100	100	**125**	75	60	**695**
3	(Canada) Ella MacPhee	75	55	80	80	42	75	51	65	40	50	**613**
4	(South Africa) Tyler Jacobs	65	50	0	48	60	DNS	65	75	**125**	70	**558**
5	(Italy) Sara Cortinovis	50	51	46	70	70	65	60	32	47	37	**528**

=== Downhill ===
==== Men's ====
**Top 5 men's elite standings**
Rank	Rider	POL (Poland)	FRA (France)	AUT (Austria)	ITA (Italy)	ITA (Italy)	AND (Andorra)	FRA (France)	SUI (Switzerland)	USA (United States)	CAN (Canada)	Total Points
1	(Canada) **Jackson Goldstone**	50	**263**	**261**	**300**	**300**	232	58	65	167	**250**	**1946**
2	(France) Loïc Bruni	**300**	100	219	155	205	**290**	170	190	139	0	**1768**
3	(United States) Luca Shaw	143	151	96	80	105	76	125	120	260	210	**1366**
4	(France) Loris Vergier	110	140	110	165	221	180	65	82	46	80	**1199**
5	(France) Amaury Pierron	180	260	84	DNS	75	54	92	**250**	65	110	**1170**

**Top 5 men's junior standings**
Rank	Rider	POL (Poland)	FRA (France)	AUT (Austria)	ITA (Italy)	ITA (Italy)	AND (Andorra)	FRA (France)	SUI (Switzerland)	USA (United States)	CAN (Canada)	Total Points
1	(France) **Max Alran**	**60**	45	50	50	14	**60**	**60**	40	**60**	40	**479**
2	(United States) Asa Vermette	22	35	45	45	50	50	50	**60**	50	**60**	**467**
3	(New Zealand) Tyler Waite	50	50	35	40	45	45	45	9	45	50	**414**
4	(France) Till Alran	28	40	40	**60**	**60**	35	40	35	DNS	16	**354**
5	(New Zealand) Jonty Williamson	40	20	22	28	30	28	28	50	40	45	**331**

==== Women's ====
**Top 5 women's elite standings**
Rank	Rider	POL (Poland)	FRA (France)	AUT (Austria)	ITA (Italy)	ITA (Italy)	AND (Andorra)	FRA (France)	SUI (Switzerland)	USA (United States)	CAN (Canada)	Total Points
1	(Austria) **Valentina Höll**	170	224	230	250	235	235	230	230	**300**	35	**2139**
2	(Canada) Gracey Hemstreet	90	**280**	**275**	180	230	170	**290**	162	50	0	**1727**
3	(United Kingdom) Tahnée Seagrave	**290**	220	120	42	190	**290**	102	**250**	100	0	**1604**
4	(Germany) Nina Hoffmann	192	68	16	96	**270**	50	80	250	50	210	**1282**
5	(France) Marine Cabirou	96	51	150	**270**	82	DNS	210	51	120	**250**	**1280**

**Top 5 women's junior standings**
Rank	Rider	POL (Poland)	FRA (France)	AUT (Austria)	ITA (Italy)	ITA (Italy)	AND (Andorra)	FRA (France)	SUI (Switzerland)	USA (United States)	CAN (Canada)	Total Points
1	(Austria) **Rosa Zierl**	35	50	**60**	**60**	50	45	**60**	**60**	35	45	**500**
2	(United States) Aletha Ostgaard	25	0	50	50	**60**	**60**	50	50	**60**	**60**	**465**
3	(New Zealand) Ellie Hulsebosch	45	35	45	25	15	40	0	30	45	50	**330**
4	(United States) Matilda Melton	40	45	DNS	40	45	DNS	30	40	50	30	**320**
5	(Austria) Lina Frener	50	**60**	DNS	10	10	30	40	35	30	40	**305**

=== Cross-country eliminator ===
**Top 5 men's elite standings**
Rank	Rider	TJK (Tajikistan)	BEL (Belgium)	GER (Germany)	TUR (Turkey)	BRA (Brazil)	ESP (Spain)	Total Points
1	(Slovenia) **Jakob Klemenčič**	**102**	66	**101**	75	45	70	**459**
2	(France) Lorenzo Serres	0	22	70	**103**	70	**120**	**385**
3	(Netherlands) Jeroen van Eck	DNS	**110**	73	61	75	32	**351**
4	(Sweden) Edvin Lindh	100	50	40	5	**120**	19	**334**
5	(Germany) Simon Gegenheimer	75	15	79	82	0	65	**316**

**Top 5 women's elite standings**
Rank	Rider	TJK (Tajikistan)	BEL (Belgium)	GER (Germany)	TUR (Turkey)	BRA (Brazil)	ESP (Spain)	Total Points
1	(Germany) **Marion Fromberger**	100	90	**110**	**120**	85	90	**595**
2	(Ukraine) Mariia Sukhopalova	**110**	0	45	90	**120**	72	**437**
3	(Netherlands) Didi de Vries	48	65	63	63	48	65	**352**
4	(Italy) Gaia Tormena	DNS	**120**	DNS	12	DNS	**103**	**235**
5	(Czech Republic) Adéla Pernická	0	0	100	75	DNS	60	**235**

=== E-MTB cross-country ===
**Top 5 men's standings**
Rank	Rider	ROM (Romania)	ROM (Romania)	MON (Monaco)	MON (Monaco)	ITA (Italy)	ITA (Italy)	ITA (Italy)	Total Points
1	(Italy) **Mirko Tabacchi**	**25**	16	20	16	20	13	16	**126**
2	(Switzerland) Joris Ryf	13	10	10	10	**25**	**25**	**25**	**118**
3	(France) Théo Charmes	16	**25**	6	20	13	16	4	**100**
4	(Italy) Andrea Garibbo	20	13	13	13	11	11	13	**94**
5	(Spain) Adrián Cuéllar	0	20	11	0	9	20	20	**80**

**Top 5 women's standings**
Rank	Rider	ROM (Romania)	ROM (Romania)	MON (Monaco)	MON (Monaco)	ITA (Italy)	ITA (Italy)	ITA (Italy)	Total Points
1	(Germany) **Sofia Wiedenroth**	20	20	**25**	**25**	20	20	16	**146**
2	(Austria) Anna Spielmann	**25**	**25**	13	0	**25**	16	20	**124**
3	(Italy) Giulia Bertoni	16	16	16	16	13	0	11	**88**
4	(Switzerland) Kathrin Stirnemann	DNS	DNS	0	0	16	**25**	**25**	**66**
5	(Spain) Sonia Rodríguez	10	10	11	0	11	13	10	**65**

=== Enduro ===
==== Elite ====
**Top 5 EDR men's elite standings**
Rank	Rider	ITA (Italy)	POL (Poland)	FRA (France)	AUT (Austria)	ITA (Italy)	ITA (Italy)	FRA (France)	Total Points
1	(Poland) **Sławomir Łukasik**	350	**400**	310	310	**400**	**400**	142	**2312**
2	(Canada) Jesse Melamed	DNS	230	280	**400**	310	310	350	**1880**
3	(New Zealand) Charles Murray	195	195	220	350	240	350	280	**1830**
4	(Australia) Daniel Booker	**400**	50	**400**	230	55	250	155	**1540**
5	(United Kingdom) William Brodie	220	210	240	250	165	195	170	**1450**

**Top 5 EDR women's elite standings**
Rank	Rider	ITA (Italy)	POL (Poland)	FRA (France)	AUT (Austria)	ITA (Italy)	ITA (Italy)	FRA (France)	Total Points
1	(United Kingdom) **Ella Conolly**	350	350	**400**	**400**	**400**	350	DNS	**2250**
2	(Slovakia) Simona Kuchyňková	220	220	220	350	310	**400**	310	**2030**
3	(Italy) Nadine Ellecosta	200	210	280	280	350	220	280	**1820**
4	(France) Morgane Charre	310	310	350	DNS	280	280	DNS	**1530**
5	(Canada) Elly Hoskin	210	400	DNS	DNS	230	240	**400**	**1480**

==== Junior ====
**Top 5 EDR men's junior standings**
Rank	Rider	ITA (Italy)	POL (Poland)	FRA (France)	AUT (Austria)	ITA (Italy)	ITA (Italy)	FRA (France)	Total Points
1	(France) **Melvin Almueis**	**150**	125	**150**	**150**	**150**	50	**150**	**875**
2	(New Zealand) Cooper Millwood	125	100	125	125	DNS	60	60	**595**
3	(Hungary) Áron Babó	DNS	DNS	DNS	100	125	75	100	**400**
4	(France) Hugo Marti	60	DNS	75	DNS	DNS	45	125	**305**
5	(Italy) Matteo Falcini	100	DNS	DNS	75	60	10	50	**295**

**Top 5 EDR women's junior standings**
Rank	Rider	ITA (Italy)	POL (Poland)	FRA (France)	AUT (Austria)	ITA (Italy)	ITA (Italy)	FRA (France)	Total Points
1	(Australia) **Lacey Adams**	125	125	**150**	**150**	**150**	100	100	**900**
2	(United States) Chloe Bear	100	100	100	100	100	75	125	**700**
3	(France) Lucile Metge	**150**	DNS	125	125	125	125	DNS	**650**
4	(Slovenia) Nežka Libnik	DNS	**150**	DNS	DNS	DNS	**150**	DNS	**300**
5	(France) Elise Porta	DNS	DNS	DNS	DNS	DNS	50	**150**	**200**

=== Marathon ===
**Top 5 men's elite standings**
Rank	Rider	ITA (Italy)	AND (Andorra)	ITA (Italy)	GER (Germany)	ESP (Spain)	Total Points
1	(Germany) **Andreas Seewald**	130	200	**250**	**250**	95	**925**
2	(Belgium) Wout Alleman	**250**	160	130	160	120	**820**
3	(Colombia) Héctor Páez	90	**250**	200	64	150	**754**
4	(Italy) Gioele De Cosmo	200	140	76	200	70	**686**
5	(Italy) Samuele Porro	48	110	74	150	200	**582**

**Top 5 women's elite standings**
Rank	Rider	ITA (Italy)	AND (Andorra)	ITA (Italy)	GER (Germany)	ESP (Spain)	Total Points
1	(Netherlands) **Rosa van Doorn**	**250**	**250**	110	**250**	200	**1060**
2	(Italy) Sandra Mairhofer	140	200	**250**	120	120	**830**
3	(Poland) Paula Gorycka	90	120	160	150	**250**	**770**
4	(Bosnia and Herzegovina) Lejla Njemčević	200	150	100	110	140	**700**
5	(Germany) Adelheid Morath	160	80	130	160	90	**620**

== See also ==
- 2025 UCI Cycling World Championships
