= 2023 UCI Mountain Bike World Championships =

International sports competition

- Location: (United Kingdom) Glentress Forest
- Dates: 3 – 12 August 2023

The 2023 UCI Mountain Bike World Championships were being held from 3 to 12 August 2023 in Glentress Forest, Scotland as part of the inaugural UCI Cycling World Championships.

== Medal summary ==
=== Medal table ===
* Host nation (Great Britain)

Rank	Nation	Gold	Silver	Bronze	Total
1	Switzerland	3	2	3	8
2	New Zealand	3	2	1	6
3	Great Britain*	3	0	3	6
4	France	2	5	4	11
5	Canada	1	2	1	4
6	Austria	1	1	0	2
6	Germany	1	1	0	2
8	Denmark	1	0	1	2
9	Netherlands	0	1	1	2
10	Italy	0	1	0	1
11	Poland	0	0	1	1
Totals (11 entries)		15	15	15	45

=== Men's events ===
Event	Gold		Silver		Bronze	
Cross-country Olympic	Tom Pidcock; Great Britain	1:22:09	Sam Gaze; New Zealand	+0:19	Nino Schurter; Switzerland	+0:34
Cross-country short track	Sam Gaze; New Zealand	20:27	Victor Koretzky; France	s.t	Tom Pidcock; Great Britain	+0:02
Electric MTB Cross-country	Joris Ryf; Switzerland	58:29	Hugo Pigeon; France	+0:21	Jérôme Gilloux; France	+1:38
Downhill	Charlie Hatton; Great Britain	4:26.747	Andreas Kolb; Austria	+ 0.599	Laurie Greenland; Great Britain	+ 1.229

=== Women's events ===
Event	Gold		Silver		Bronze	
Cross-country Olympic	Pauline Ferrand-Prévot; France	1:24:14	Loana Lecomte; France	+ 1:14	Puck Pieterse; Netherlands	+ 1:27
Cross-country short track	Pauline Ferrand-Prévot; France	21:17	Puck Pieterse; Netherlands	+ 0:04	Evie Richards; Great Britain	+ 0:09
Electric MTB Cross-country	Nathalie Schneitter; Switzerland	52:23	Sofia Wiedenroth; Germany	+ 1:00	Justine Tonso; France	+ 1:34
Downhill	Valentina Höll; Austria	4:58.242	Camille Balanche; Switzerland	+ 2.020	Marine Cabirou; France	+ 2.361

=== Team events ===
Event	Gold		Silver		Bronze	
Cross-country Olympic	Switzerland; Dario Lillo; Nicolas Halter; Linda Indergand; Ronja Blöchlinger; Anina Hutter; Nino Schurter	1:05:42	France; Adrien Boichis; Julien Hemon; Loana Lecomte; Line Burquier; Anaïs Moulin; Jordan Sarrou	+0:09	Denmark; Tobias Lillelund; Albert Philipsen; Julie Lillelund; Sofie Pedersen; Caroline Bohe; Sebastian Fini Carstensen	+0:41

=== Under-23 and Junior events ===
Event	Gold		Silver		Bronze	
Men's Under-23 Cross-country	Charlie Aldridge; Great Britain	1:13.53	Adrien Boichis; France	+ 0:13	Dario Lillo; Switzerland	+ 0:29
Men's Junior Cross-country	Albert Philipsen; Denmark	1:07.55	Elian Paccagnella; Italy	+0:54	Ian Ackert; Canada	+1:03
Men's Junior Downhill	Henri Kiefer; Germany	4:30.727	Bodhi Kuhn; Canada	+ 0.418	Léo Abella; France	+ 3.964
Women's Under-23 Cross-country	Sammie Maxwell; New Zealand	1:16:26	Ginia Caluori; Switzerland	+1:01	Ronja Blöchlinger; Switzerland	+1:27
Women's Junior Cross-country	Isabella Holmgren; Canada	1:07.37	Marin Lowe; Canada	+0:39	Natalia Grzegorzewska; Poland	+1:24
Women's Junior Downhill	Erice van Leuven; New Zealand	5:15.613	Poppy Lane; New Zealand	+ 5.208	Sacha Earnest; New Zealand	+ 5.625
