= Sammie Maxwell =

New Zealand cyclist (born 2001)

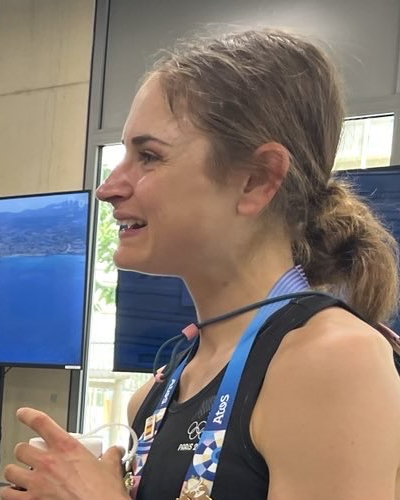
- Maxwell in 2024

Personal information
- Full name: Samara Louise Maxwell
- Born: 27 December 2001 (age 24) Taupō, New Zealand
- Height: 168 cm (5 ft 6 in)

Cycling career
- Sport: Cycling
- Discipline: Mountain biking
- Role: Rider
- Rider type: cross-country

Major wins
- Mountain bike XC World Cup (2025) 2 individual wins (2025)
Medal record
Women's cycle racing
Representing New Zealand
World Championships
| Gold medal – first place | 2023 Glasgow | U23 cross-country |

Samara Louise Maxwell (born 27 December 2001), generally known as Sammie Maxwell, is a cross-country cyclist from New Zealand. At the 2023 UCI Mountain Bike World Championships, she became the women's under-23 cross-country world champion. She also became the first New Zealand woman to win an Elite Worldcup Event at the opening round of the 2025 season at Araxa.

== Early life ==
Maxwell was born on 27 December 2001 in Taupō. She received her schooling at Taupo Intermediate School and Tauhara College.

In 2018, Maxwell was diagnosed as suffering from relative energy deficiency in sport (RED-S) which developed from an eating disorder earlier in her career. In early 2021, Maxwell was on a reduced training programme to deal with reduced energy levels.

Maxwell is based in Wellington. She studied at Victoria University of Wellington, graduating with a bachelor's degree in biomedical sciences in 2023. She aims to complete a PhD one day and work in cancer research.

== Cycling career ==
Maxwell began mountain biking as an eight-year-old, inspired by her father, who also got her brother riding. She mainly competes in cross-country, but also races cyclo-cross and on the road.

Maxwell competed at the 2018 Summer Youth Olympics in Buenos Aires, Argentina, alongside Phoebe Young in the combined team event; they came eighth.

At the 2019 UCI Mountain Bike World Championships in Mont-Sainte-Anne, Canada, Maxwell came 14th in the junior cross-country race.

At the August 2023 UCI Mountain Bike World Championships held in Scotland's Glentress Forest, Maxwell beat the two Swiss riders who had been seen as pre-race favourites: Ginia Caluori and Ronja Blöchlinger. In the world championship race, she held a lead from the beginning. She is the first New Zealander to win the U23 world title.

Maxwell was not selected by Cycling New Zealand for the 2024 Summer Olympics. She took a case against the sporting body with the Sports Tribunal of New Zealand, who ruled that Cycling New Zealand "is taking a discriminatory attitude towards athletes who have eating disorders". The tribunal further found that the sporting body had made its decision based on inaccurate and outdated medical information that had not been shared with Maxwell, who therefore had no ability to have the information corrected. As the tribunal's decision was made on 15 July 2024, they said there was insufficient time to refer the case back to Cycling New Zealand, and ruled for Maxwell to be nominated for the Olympic women's cross-country event. At the Paris Olympics Maxwell finished eighth.

At the Araxa leg of the UCI World cup Maxwell placed second in the short track event and first in the Cross Country Olympic, becoming the first New Zealand woman to win a World Cup event.

== Major results ==
=== Mountain bike ===
2018
1st Cross-country, National Junior Championships
2019
1st Cross-country, National Junior Championships
2nd Cross-country, Oceania Junior Championships
2020
2nd Cross-country, Oceania Under-23 Championships
2nd Cross-country, National Championships
2021
1st Cross-country, National Championships
2022
National Championships

1st Cross-country
1st Eliminator
1st Marathon

2023
1st Cross-country, UCI World Under-23 Championships
2nd Cross-country, Oceania Championships
National Championships

1st Eliminator
2nd Marathon

3rd Overall UCI Under-23 XCO World Cup

1st Les Gets
1st Snowshoe
2nd Leogang
2nd Val di Sole
4th Pal–Arinsal
5th Mont-Sainte-Anne

UCI Under-23 XCC World Cup

2nd Pal–Arinsal
2nd Les Gets
2nd Snowshoe
2nd Mont-Sainte-Anne

Ökk Bike Revolution

3rd Huttwil

2024
1st Cross-country, Oceania Championships
National Championships

1st Cross-country
1st Marathon
1st Short track
2nd Eliminator

French Cup

1st Les Menuires–La Croisette

Swiss Bike Cup

1st Leysin

2025
Oceania Championships

1st Cross-country
1st Short track

National Championships

1st Cross-country
1st Short track

1st Overall UCI XCO World Cup

1st Araxá I
1st Pal–Arinsal
2nd Araxá II
2nd Nové Město
2nd Leogang
2nd Val di Sole
2nd Mont-Sainte-Anne
3rd Les Gets
3rd Lake Placid

2nd Cross-country, UCI World Championships
UCI XCC World Cup

2nd Araxá I
2nd Leogang
3rd Les Gets

2026
5th Cross-country, UCI World Championships
