= 2025 UCI Mountain Bike World Championships =

Cycling world championships

- Location: Valais, Switzerland
- Dates: 30 August – 14 September, 27 Events

The 2025 UCI Mountain Bike World Championships was held from 30 August to 14 September 2025 in Valais, Switzerland.

== Medal table ==
* Host nation (Switzerland)

Rank	Nation	Gold	Silver	Bronze	Total
1	France	9	3	7	19
2	Canada	4	1	3	8
3	United States	3	2	1	6
4	Austria	3	0	1	4
5	Switzerland*	2	8	4	14
6	Slovenia	2	0	0	2
7	New Zealand	1	3	0	4
8	Sweden	1	1	0	2
9	Czech Republic	1	0	1	2
9	South Africa	1	0	1	2
11	Italy	0	3	1	4
12	Germany	0	2	2	4
13	Great Britain	0	1	1	2
14	Chile	0	1	0	1
14	Namibia	0	1	0	1
14	Poland	0	1	0	1
17	Belgium	0	0	1	1
17	Colombia	0	0	1	1
17	Denmark	0	0	1	1
17	Ireland	0	0	1	1
17	Netherlands	0	0	1	1
Totals (21 entries)		27	27	27	81

== Medal summary ==
=== Men's events ===
Event	Gold		Silver		Bronze	
Cross-country Marathon	Keegan Swenson; United States	6:01:44.3	Samuele Porro; Italy	6:02:10.0	Héctor Leonardo Páez; Colombia	6:05:27.2
Downhill	Jackson Goldstone; Canada	2:54.153	Henri Kiefer; Germany	+1.946	Rónán Dunne; Ireland	+1.993
Electric Cross-country	Jerome Gilloux; France	48:28	Joris Ryf; Switzerland	+0:07	Hugo Pigeon; France	+0:11
Electric MTB Enduro	Adrien Dailly; France	31:32.11	Hugo Pigeon; France	+30.20	Damien Oton; France	+34.61
Enduro	Richard Rude Jr; United States	29:37.67	Sławomir Łukasik; Poland	+2.50	Elliot Jamieson; Canada	+20.48
Pump Track	Eddy Clerté; France	20.023	Tristan Borel; Switzerland	20.168	Jesse Elzenga; Netherlands	20.948
Cross Country Short Track	Victor Koretzky; France	21:26	Christopher Blevins; United States	+0:01	Mathis Azzaro; France	+0:03
Cross Country Olympic	Alan Hatherly; South Africa	1:30:30	Simone Avondetto; Italy	+0:48	Victor Koretzky; France	+0:51

=== Women's events ===
Event	Gold		Silver		Bronze	
Cross-country Marathon	Kate Courtney; United States	7:10:11.1	Anna Weinbeer; Switzerland	7:13:55.9	Mona Mitterwallner; Austria	7:15:10.2
Downhill	Valentina Höll; Austria	3:27.136	Myriam Nicole; France	+0.667	Marine Cabirou; France	+1.091
Electric Cross-country	Anna Spielmann; Austria	44:08	Kathrin Stirnemann; Switzerland	+0:35	Sofia Wiedenroth; Germany	+1:57
Electric MTB Enduro	George Swift; New Zealand	38:06.55	Florencia Espiñeira Herreros; Chile	+8.43	Tracy Moseley; Great Britain	+9.75
Enduro	Elly Hoskin; Canada	35:13.67	Ella Conolly; Great Britain	+4.53	Mélanie Pugin; France	+6.84
Pump Track	Sabina Košárková; Czech Republic	22.424	Christa von Niederhäusern; Switzerland	22.444	Alina Beck; Germany	22.741
Cross Country Short Track	Alessandra Keller; Switzerland	20:43	Jenny Rissveds; Sweden	+0:04	Jennifer Jackson; Canada	+0:14
Cross Country Olympic	Jenny Rissveds; Sweden	1:21:35	Samara Maxwell; New Zealand	+0:18	Alessandra Keller; Switzerland	+0:56

=== Mixed relay ===
Event	Gold		Silver		Bronze	
Mixed cross-country team relay	France	1:05:14	Italy	+0:34	Switzerland	+1:33

=== Under-23 and Junior events ===
Event	Gold		Silver		Bronze	
Men under-23 cross-country short track	Adrien Boichis; France	20:57	Finn Treudler; Switzerland	+0:00	Cole Punchard; Canada	+0:02
Men under-23 cross-country olympic	Finn Treudler; Switzerland	1:20:25	Cole Punchard; Canada	+0:54	Gustav Pedersen; Denmark	+2:14
Men junior cross-country olympic	Lucas Teste; France	1:14:49	Roger Surén; Namibia	+0:11	Lewin Iten; Switzerland	+0:31
Men junior downhill	Max Alran; France	3:00.878	Tyler Waite; New Zealand	+2.916	Till Alran; France	+3.379
Men junior enduro	Melvin Almueis; France	31:22.41	Noé Forlin; Switzerland	+10.90	Gabriel Sainthuile; Belgium	+21.41
Women under-23 cross-country short track	Isabella Holmgren; Canada	19:52	Carla Hahn; Germany	+0:20	Tyler Jaocbs; South Africa	+0:26
Women under-23 cross-country olympic	Isabella Holmgren; Canada	1:17:24	Vida Lopez de San Roman; United States	+2:16	Valentina Corvi; Italy	+3:20
Women junior cross-country olympic	Maruša Tereza Šerkezi; Slovenia	1:01:27	Anja Grossmann; Switzerland	+1:13	Barbora Bukovská; Czech Republic	+2:50
Women junior downhill	Rosa Zierl; Austria	3:35.962	Eliana Hulsebosch; New Zealand	+1.864	Aletha Ostgaard; United States	+2.316
Women junior enduro	Nežka Libnik; Slovenia	36:51.96	Elise Porta; France	+41.61	Elena Frei; Switzerland	+1:30.97
