= Martín Vidaurre =

Chilean cyclist (born 2000)

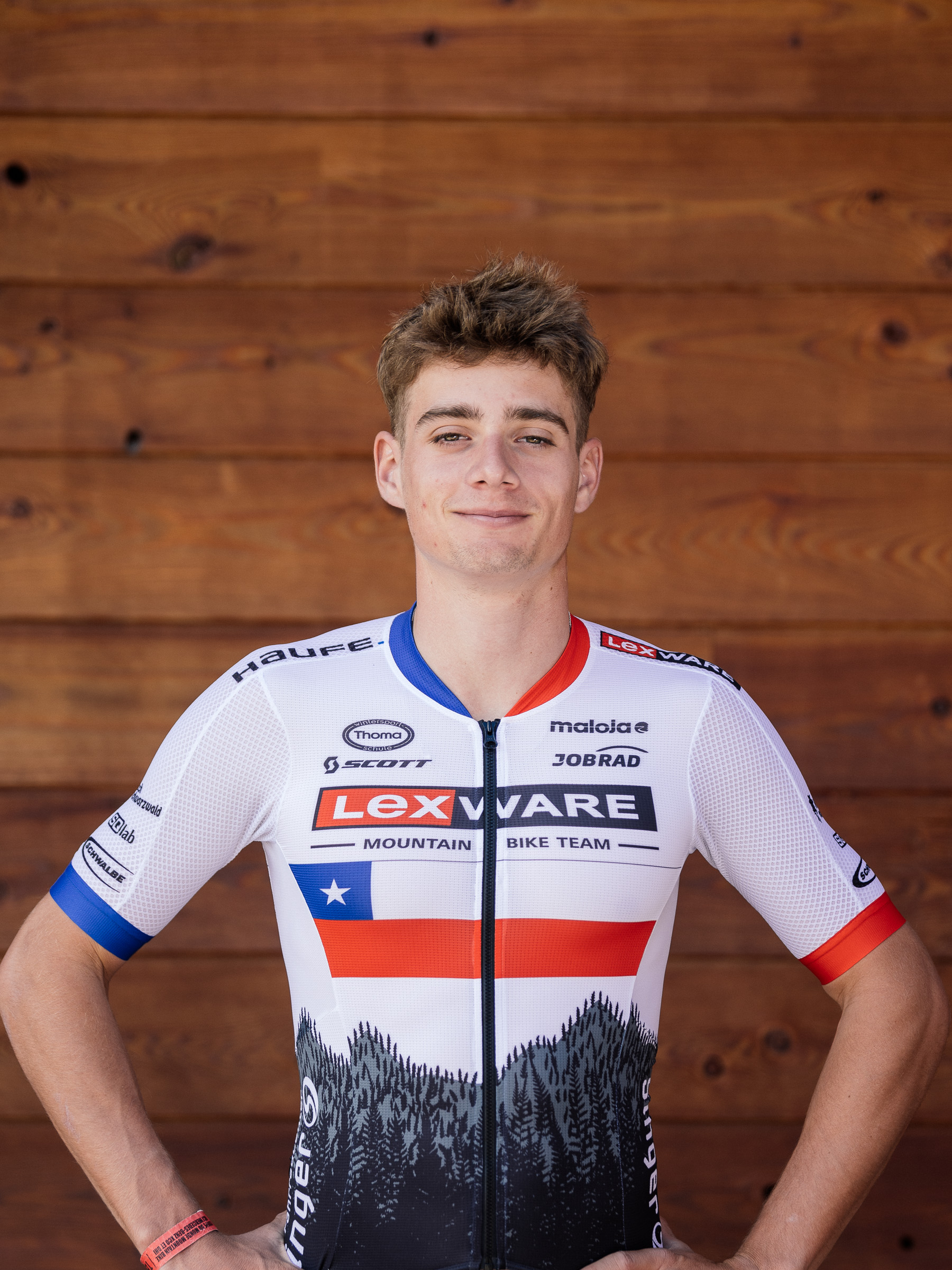
- Vidaurre in 2021

Personal information
- Full name: Martín Vidaurre Kossmann
- Born: 18 February 2000 (age 26) Santiago, Chile
- Height: 1.76 m (5 ft 9 in)

Cycling career
- Sport: Cycling
- Current team: Lexware Mountainbike Team
- Disciplines: Mountain bike; Road
- Role: Rider
- Rider type: Cross-country

Major wins
- Mountain bike National XC Championships (2022, 2024, 2025, 2026) XC World Cup 2 individual wins (2025, 2026)
Medal record
Men's mountain bike racing
Representing Chile
World Championships
Gold medal – first place	2021 Val di Sole	Under-23 Cross-country
Silver medal – second place	2024 Vallnord	E-MTB Cross-country
Pan American Games
Silver medal – second place	2023 Santiago	Cross-country
Bronze medal – third place	2019 Lima	Cross-country
Junior Pan American Games
Gold medal – first place	2021 Cali-Valle	Cross-country

Martín Vidaurre Kossmann (Note: In this Spanish name, the first or paternal surname is Vidaurre and the second or maternal family name is Kossmann.) (born 18 February 2000) is a Chilean cross-country mountain biker. He competed in the cross-country races at the 2020 Summer Olympics and the 2024 Summer Olympics, finishing at positions 16th and 11th, respectively. He also won the bronze medal in the cross-country race at the 2019 Pan American Games and silver medal in the same discipline at the 2023 Pan American Games.

== Major results ==
=== Mountain bike ===
2017
1st Cross-country, Pan American Junior Championships
1st Cross-country, National Junior Championships
2018
1st Cross-country, Pan American Junior Championships
2019
1st Cross-country, National Under-23 Championships
Pan American Championships

2nd Under-23 Cross-country
2nd Team relay

3rd Cross-country, Pan American Games
2021
1st Cross-country, UCI World Under-23 Championships
Pan American Championships

1st Under-23 Cross-country
2nd Short track

1st [ Overall UCI Under-23 XCO World Cup

1st Lenzerheide
1st Snowshoe
2nd Leogang
2nd Les Gets

2nd Cross-country, National Championships
2022
1st Cross-country, National Championships
Pan American Championships

1st Under-23 Cross-country
3rd Short track

1st Overall UCI Under-23 XCO World Cup

1st Petrópolis
1st Albstadt
1st Nové Město
1st Leogang
1st Snowshoe
1st Mont-Sainte-Anne
1st Val di Sole

2023
1st Short track, National Championships
2nd Cross-country, Pan American Games
2024
National Championships

1st Cross-country
1st Short track

2nd Cross-country, UCI World E-MTB Championships
UCI XCC World Cup

3rd Mairiporã

UCI XCO World Cup

5th Mairiporã

2025
1st Cross-country, National Championships
2nd Overall UCI XCO World Cup

1st Val di Sole
2nd Araxá II
3rd Araxá I
4th Lake Placid
5th Lenzerheide

UCI XCC World Cup

2nd Leogang

2026
National Championships

1st Cross-country
1st Short track

UCI XCO World Cup

1st Soldier Hollow
3rd Les Gets
4th Lenzerheide
5th Nové Město

4th Cross-country, UCI World Championships

=== Road ===
2023
1st Overall Vuelta del Porvenir San Luis

1st Stage 5

4th Road race, Pan American Games
