= Evie Richards =

British cyclist (born 1997)

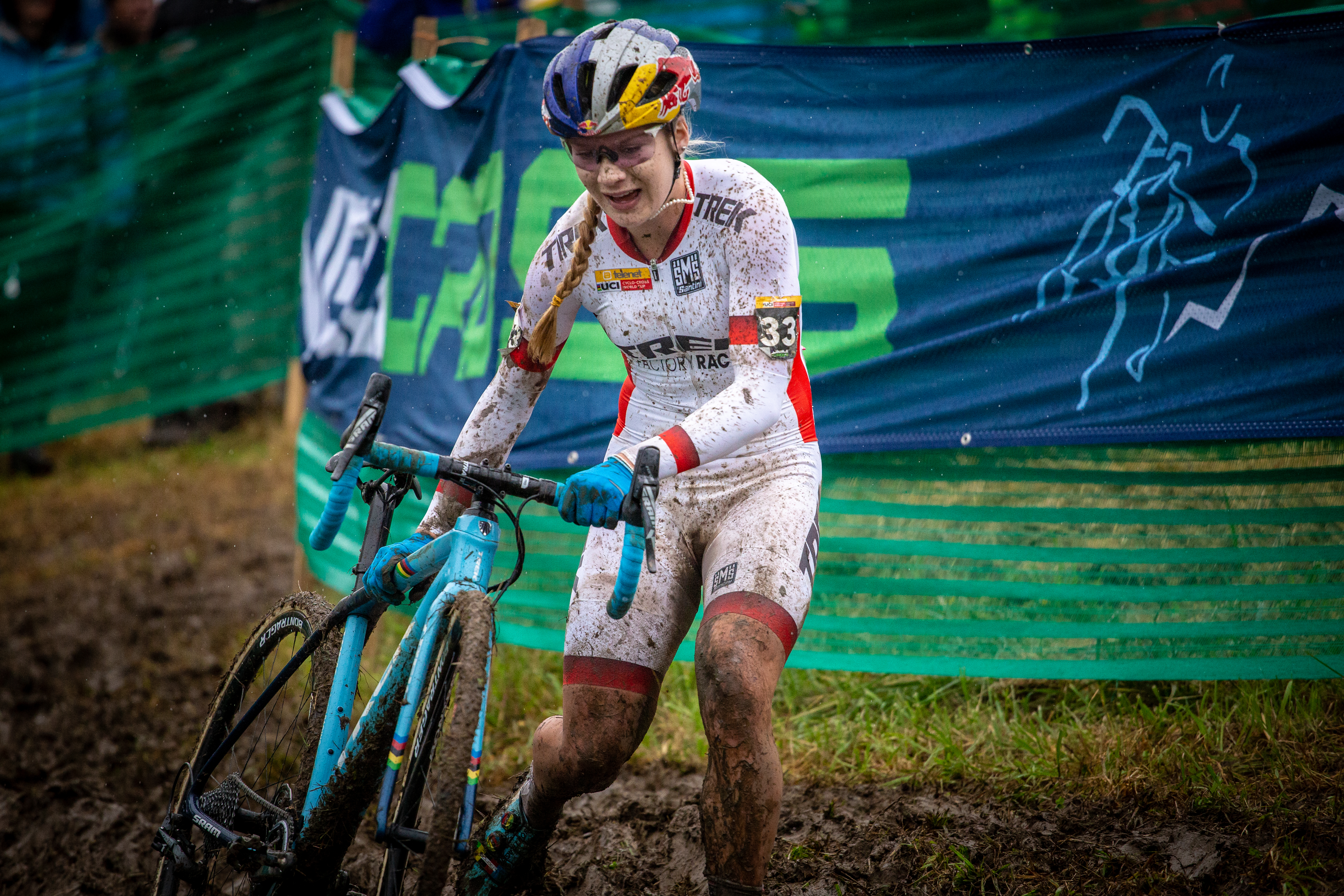
- Richards during the UCI CX World Cup in Iowa on 29 September 2018

Personal information
- Full name: Evie Richards
- Born: 11 March 1997 (age 29) Malvern, Worcestershire, England

Cycling career
- Sport: Cycling
- Current team: Trek Factory Racing
- Disciplines: Mountain Bike (Cross-country); Cyclo-cross
- Role: Rider

Major wins
- Cyclo-cross World Cup 1 individual win (2017–18) Mountain bike World XC Championships (2021) National XC Championships (2023) XC World Cup 2 individual wins (2021)
Medal record
Women's Mountain bike racing
Representing Great Britain
World Championships
Gold medal – first place	2021 Val di Sole	Cross-country
Gold medal – first place	2024 Vallnord	Cross-country short track
Silver medal – second place	2015 Vallnord	Junior Cross-country
Silver medal – second place	2021 Val di Sole	Cross-country short track
European Championships
Silver medal – second place	2025 Melgaço	Cross-country
Representing England
Commonwealth Games
Gold medal – first place	2022 Birmingham	Cross-country
Silver medal – second place	2018 Gold Coast	Cross-country
Women's Cyclo-cross
Representing Great Britain
World Championships
Gold medal – first place	2016 Zolder	Under-23
Gold medal – first place	2018 Valkenburg	Under-23
Bronze medal – third place	2017 Bieles	Under-23

Evie Richards (born 11 March 1997) is a British cyclist from Malvern, Worcestershire, England who specialises in mountain bike and cyclo-cross racing. She was the women's cross-country world champion at the 2021 Mountain Bike World Championships. Previously, Richards had been under-23 cyclo-cross world champion at the 2016 and 2018 World Championships. In 2022, Richards added a first Commonwealth Games gold in cross-country mountain bike to her palmarès.

== Life and career ==
Richards comes from Malvern and attended The Chase School. She first rode for T-Mo Racing. She is a member of the British Cycling Olympic Senior Academy.

She took the silver medal position in the junior cross-country race at the 2015 mountain bike World Championships, held in Vallnoord, Andorra in September 2015.

Prior to 2016 under-23 cyclo-cross events were only held for male competitors, Richards therefore raced in the elite category. After the introduction of under-23 events, Richards won the first three editions (2016, 2017, 2018) of the British National Cyclo-cross Championships. In addition, she was 7th in the women's elite category and 2nd in the junior category in the British national cyclo-cross championships in 2015.

On 30 January 2016, Richards won the first ever women's U23 competition at the cyclo-cross world championships in Zolder, Belgium. She broke away in the first lap and finished the race 35 seconds ahead of the second-placed rider, Nikola Noskova. It was the first cyclo-cross race Richards had taken part in outside the UK.

Richards was chosen to be part of the UK's cycling squad at the postponed 2020 Tokyo Olympics where she achieved a 7th-place finish.

By the final round of the 2021 season, she scored success at Snowshoe, winning the U23 race in 2019. Her weekend began with an XCC win—her first in 2021 and third of her elite career.

== Major results ==
=== Cyclo-cross ===
2014–2015
2nd National Junior Championships
2015–2016
1st UCI World Under-23 Championships
1st National Under-23 Championships
National Trophy Series

1st Bradford

2016–2017
1st National Under-23 Championships
National Trophy Series

1st Abergavenny

3rd UCI World Under-23 Championships
2017–2018
1st UCI World Under-23 Championships
1st National Under-23 Championships
UCI World Cup

1st Namur
3rd Hoogerheide

2018–2019
1st Waterloo
UCI World Cup

2nd Iowa City
4th Waterloo

2019–2020
UCI World Cup

3rd Waterloo
4th Namur
5th Iowa City
5th Hoogerheide

3rd Iowa City

==== UCI World Cup results ====
Season	1	2	3	4	5	6	7	8	9	10	11	12	13	14	Rank	Points
2016–2017	LAS —	IOW —	VAL —	KOK; NH	ZEV; 14	NAM; 11	ZOL —	FIU —	HOO; 6						34	127
2017–2018	IOW —	WAT —	KOK —	BOG —	ZEV —	NAM; 1	ZOL —	NOM —	HOO; 3						33	145
2018–2019	WAT; 4	IOW; 2	BER —	TAB; 15	KOK; 9	NAM —	ZOL —	PON —	HOO —						23	210
2019–2020	IOW; 5	WAT; 3	BER —	TAB —	KOK —	NAM; 4	ZOL —	NOM —	HOO; 5						19	235
2020–2021	WAT; NH	DUB; NH	ZON; NH	KOK; NH	BES; NH	TAB —	ANT; NH	NAM; 6	DIE; NH	DEN —	HUL —	VIL; NH	HOO; NH	OVE; 8	17	38

=== Mountain bike ===
2014
2nd Cross-country, National Junior Championships
2015
2nd Cross-country, UCI World Junior Championships
2016
1st Cross-country, National Under-23 Championships
National XCO Series

1st Builth Wells
1st Dalby Forest
1st Plymouth

1st Int. KitzAlpBike-Festival
UCI Under-23 XCO World Cup

2nd Albstadt
2nd La Bresse

Internazionali d'Italia Series

2nd Milan

3rd Cross-country, UEC European Under-23 Championships
4th Cross-country, UCI World Under-23 Championships
2017
1st Cross-country, National Under-23 Championships
3rd Overall UCI Under-23 XCO World Cup

1st Albstadt
2nd Nové Město
3rd Vallnord
3rd Lenzerheide
3rd Val di Sole

Copa Catalana Internacional

1st Vall de Boi

National XCO Series

1st Llanelli
1st Richmond

2018
1st Cross-country, National Under-23 Championships
National XCO Series

1st Builth Wells

2nd Cross–country, Commonwealth Games
Internazionali d'Italia Series

2nd Chies d'Alpago

3rd Overall UCI Under-23 XCO World Cup

2nd Albstadt
2nd Val di Sole
2nd Vallnord
2nd Mont-Sainte-Anne
2nd La Bresse
3rd Stellenbosch

2019
1st Cross-country, National Under-23 Championships
3rd Overall UCI Under-23 XCO World Cup

1st Snowshoe
2nd Vallnord
2nd Les Gets
2nd Val di Sole

Internazionali d'Italia Series

1st La Thuile

Swiss Bike Cup

2nd Andermatt

National XCO Series

2nd Cannock Chase

4th Cross-country, UCI World Under-23 Championships
2020
UCI XCC World Cup

1st Nové Město I
1st Nové Město II

Copa Catalana Internacional

1st Banyoles

3rd Overall Cyprus Sunshine Epic
4th Cross-country, UEC European Championships
2021
UCI World Championships

1st Cross-country
2nd Short track

2nd Overall UCI XCO World Cup

1st Lenzerheide
1st Snowshoe
3rd Les Gets
5th Nové Město

UCI XCC World Cup

1st Snowshoe
2nd Lenzerheide

Swiss Bike Cup

1st Gränichen

Internazionali d'Italia Series

1st La Thuile

Copa Catalana Internacional

1st Banyoles

2022
1st Cross–country, Commonwealth Games
Copa Catalana Internacional

1st Banyoles

National Championships

2nd Cross-country
2nd Short track

2nd Overall Mediterranean Epic
UCI XCC World Cup

3rd Petrópolis

Internazionali d'Italia Series

3rd La Thuile

CIMTB Michelin

3rd Petrópolis

2023
National Championships

1st Cross-country
1st Short track

Ökk Bike Revolution

1st Chur

National XCO Series

1st Margam

2nd Chelva
3rd Short track, UCI World Championships
3rd Overall UCI XCC World Cup

1st Snowshoe
2nd Vallnord
2nd Les Gets
3rd Leogang

Shimano Super Cup

3rd Banyoles

UCI XCO World Cup

4th Nové Město
5th Vallnord

2024
1st Short track, UCI World Championships
National XCO Series

1st Fowey

2nd Overall UCI XCC World Cup

1st Mairiporã
3rd Lake Placid
3rd Mont-Sainte-Anne

2nd Chelva
5th Cross-country, Olympic Games
UCI XCO World Cup

5th Crans-Montana

2025
National Championships

1st Short track
2nd Cross-country

1st Overall UCI XCC World Cup

1st Araxá I
1st Araxá II
2nd Nové Město
2nd Pal–Arinsal
2nd Lake Placid
2nd Mont-Sainte-Anne

1st Melgaço
2nd Cross-country, UEC European Championships
UCI XCO World Cup

2nd Lake Placid
3rd Araxá II
3rd Mont-Sainte-Anne
4th Lenzerheide

3rd Chelva
4th Cross-country, UCI World Championships
2026
National XCO Series

1st Cannock Chase

2nd Short track, UCI World Championships
UCI XCC World Cup

2nd Mona Yongpyong

2nd Chelva
5th Cross-country, UEC European Championships

==== UCI World Cup results ====
Season	1	2	3	4	5	6	7	8	9	10	Rank	Points
2020	LEN; NH	VAL; NH	LES; NH	NOV; 8	NOV; 6						5	320
2021	ALB; 25	NOV; 5	LEO; 6	LES; 3	LEN; 1	SNO; 1					2	1000
2022	PET —	ALB; 16	NOV; 36	LEO —	LEN —	AND —	SNO —	MON —	VAL; 7		39	316
2023	NOV; 4	LEN; 6	LEO; 27	VAL; 9	AND; 5	LES; 14	SNO; 7	MON; DNF			9	1156
2024	MAI; 9	ARA; 8	NOV —	VAL; 29	CRA; 5	LES; 6	LAK; 25	MON; 6			8	1030
2025	ARA; 11	ARA; 3	NOV; 32	LEO; 13	VAL —	AND; 6	LES; 8	LEN; 4	LAK; 2	MON; 3	4	1682
