= 2026 UCI Mountain Bike World Championships =

Cycling world championships

- Venue: Daolasa di Commezzadura
- Location: Val di Sole, Italy
- Dates: 26–30 August 2026

The 2026 UCI Mountain Bike World Championships are being held from 26 to 30 August 2026 in Val di Sole, Italy.

== Medal table ==
* Host nation (Italy)

Rank	Nation	Gold	Silver	Bronze	Total
1	Switzerland	5	5	5	15
2	France	3	1	3	7
3	Austria	3	1	1	5
4	Italy*	2	1	1	4
5	Australia	2	0	0	2
6	Great Britain	1	5	2	8
7	Canada	1	0	1	2
8	United States	0	1	2	3
9	New Zealand	0	1	1	2
10	Czech Republic	0	1	0	1
10	Germany	0	1	0	1
12	Netherlands	0	0	1	1
Totals (12 entries)		17	17	17	51

== Medal summary ==
=== Men's events ===
Event	Gold		Silver		Bronze	
Cross-country Olympic	Thomas Pidcock; Great Britain	1:25:26	Charlie Aldridge; Great Britain	+0:17	Cole Punchard; Canada	+0:31
Cross-country short track	Adrien Boichis; France	20:32	Charlie Aldridge; Great Britain	+0:00	Luca Martin; France	+0:02
Electric Cross-country	Jérôme Gilloux; France	53:38	Joris Ryf; Switzerland	+0:08	Stéphane Tempier; France	+2:10
Under-23 cross-country Olympic	Naël Rouffiac; France	1:17:20	Alix André-Gallis; France	+0:09	Nicolas Halter; Switzerland	+0:13
Under-23 cross-country short track	Nicolas Halter; Switzerland	20:54	Paul Schehl; Germany	+0:00	Rens Teunissen van Manen; Netherlands	+0:03
Junior cross-country Olympic	Connor Wright; Australia	1:00:09	Michael Hettegger; Austria	+1:16	Marwan Barhoumi; Switzerland	+1:43
Downhill	Jackson Goldstone; Canada	3:28.785	Lachlan Stevens-McNab; New Zealand	+0.695	Jordan Williams; Great Britain	+0.702
Junior downhill	Raoul Schneeberger; Switzerland	3:47.477	Felix Griffiths; Great Britain	+0.450	Filippo Gilardino; Italy	+1.170

=== Women's events ===
Event	Gold		Silver		Bronze	
Cross-country Olympic	Sina Frei; Switzerland	1:27:50	Martina Berta; Italy	+1:07	Nicole Koller; Switzerland	+1:07
Cross-country short track	Laura Stigger; Austria	20:50	Evie Richards; Great Britain	+0:00	Sina Frei; Switzerland	+0:01
Electric cross-country	Anna Spielmann; Austria	48:26	Kathrin Stirnemann; Switzerland	+0:11	Tamara Wiedmann; Austria	+0:44
Under-23 cross-country Olympic	Valentina Corvi; Italy	1:19:34	Anina Hutter; Switzerland	+0:43	Monique Halter; Switzerland	+1:55
Under-23 cross-country short track	Monique Halter; Switzerland	19:55	Bethany-Ann Jackson; Great Britain	+0:00	Makena Kellerman; United States	+0:01
Junior cross-country Olympic	Anja Grossmann; Switzerland	57:57	Barbora Bukovská; Czech Republic	+0:48	Agathe Vauchamp; France	+1:26
Downhill	Valentina Höll; Austria	4:01.558	Lisa Baumann; Switzerland	+1.728	Harriet Harnden; Great Britain	+2.046
Junior downhill	Tilly Boadle; Australia	4:13.323	Aletha Ostgaard; United States	+7.636	Indy Deavoll; New Zealand	+16.895

=== Mixed relay ===
Event	Gold		Silver		Bronze	
Cross-country team relay	Italy	1:08:06	Switzerland	+0:51	United States	+1:31
