= Gunnar Holmgren =

Canadian cyclist (born 1999)

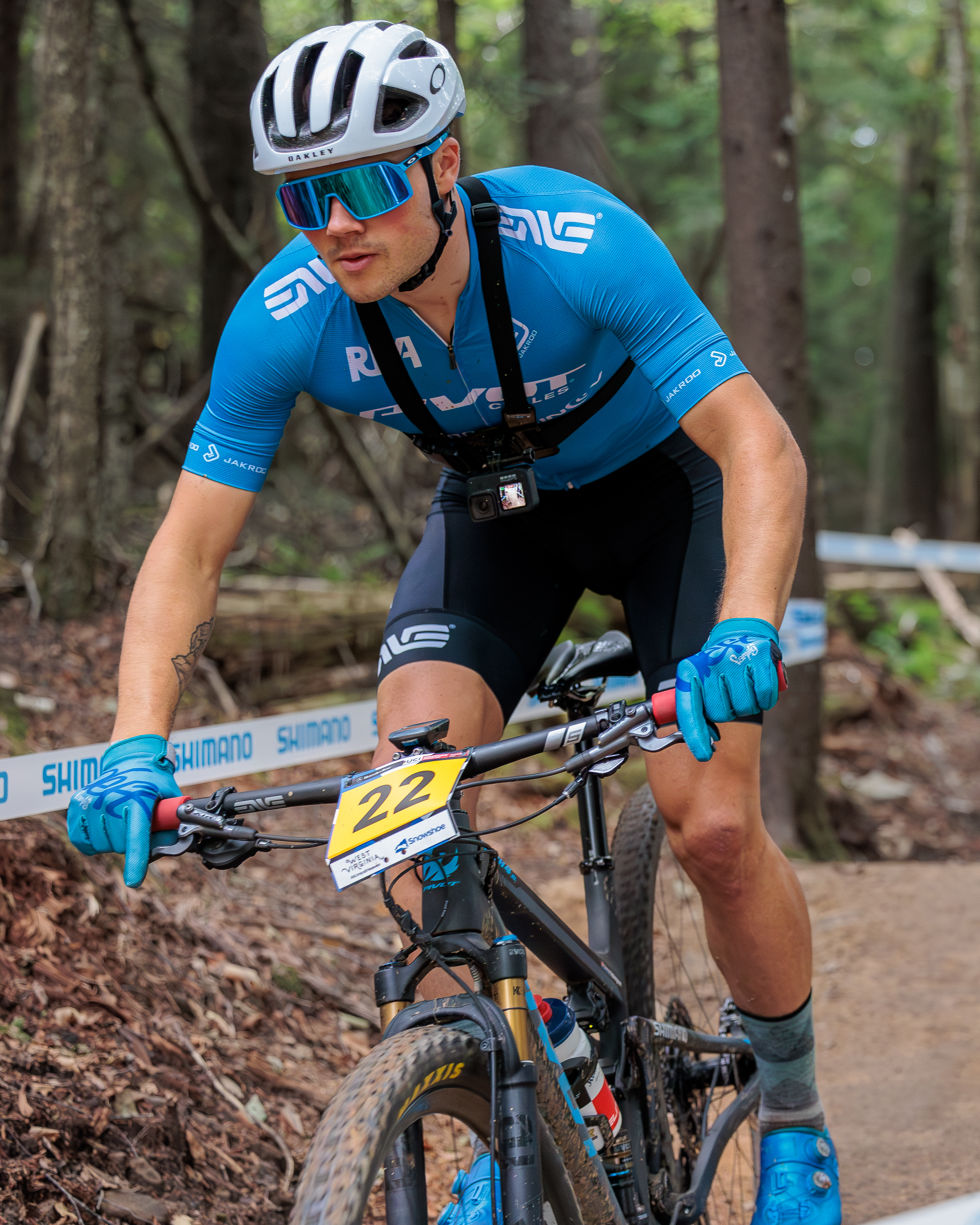
- Gunnar Holmgren competes at the 2021 UCI Cross Country MTB World Cup in Snowshoe, West Virginia.

Personal information
- Born: June 23, 1999 (age 27) Barrie, Ontario

Cycling career
- Sport: Cycling
- Current team: Pivot Cycles–OTE
- Disciplines: Mountain biking; Cyclo-cross
- Role: Rider
Medal record
Representing Canada
Men's Mountain bike racing
Pan American Games
Gold medal – first place	2023 Santiago	Cross-country

Gunnar Holmgren (born June 23, 1999) is a Canadian cross-country mountain biker and cyclo-cross cyclist. He won the cross-country race at the 2023 Pan American Games.

== Early and family life ==
Holmgren grew up in a sporting, outdoors environment, with his parents Robert and Lisa both being keen mountain bike racers and his family living on the Hardwood Ski and Bike facility. Despite this, Gunnar's first sport was figure skating, which he competed in at a high level until the age of 14, when he switched to cycling. He is the older brother of fellow racing cyclists and twin sisters Ava and Isabella Holmgren.

== Career ==
At the 2024 Mountain Bike World Cup round in Nové Město na Moravě in May, Holmgren scored a personal best of eighth, the day after his sister Isabella won on her Under-23 World Cup debut at the same venue. That same year, Gunnar and Isabella were named to Canada's 2024 Olympic team.

== Major results ==
=== Mountain bike ===
2016
3rd Cross-country, National Junior Championships
2017
2nd Cross-country, National Junior Championships
2021
1st Cross-country, National Under-23 Championships
2023
1st Cross-country, Pan American Games
Pan American Championships

1st Mixed relay
3rd Cross-country short track

2024
Pan American Championships

3rd Cross-country
3rd Cross-country short track

=== Cyclo-cross ===
2015–2016
2nd National Junior Championships
2016–2017
1st National Junior Championships
1stJunior Indianapolis I & II
Junior KMC Festival

2nd Day 1
3rd Day 2

2018–2019
1st National Under-23 Championships
1st Peterborough
1st Day 1 & 2, Sherbrooke
2019–2020
1st National Under-23 Championships
2nd Peterborough
2022–2023
2nd Northampton II
3rd Northampton I
3rd National Championships
2024–2025
1st Indianapolis II
