= Gerardo Ulloa =

Mexican road and mountain bike cyclist

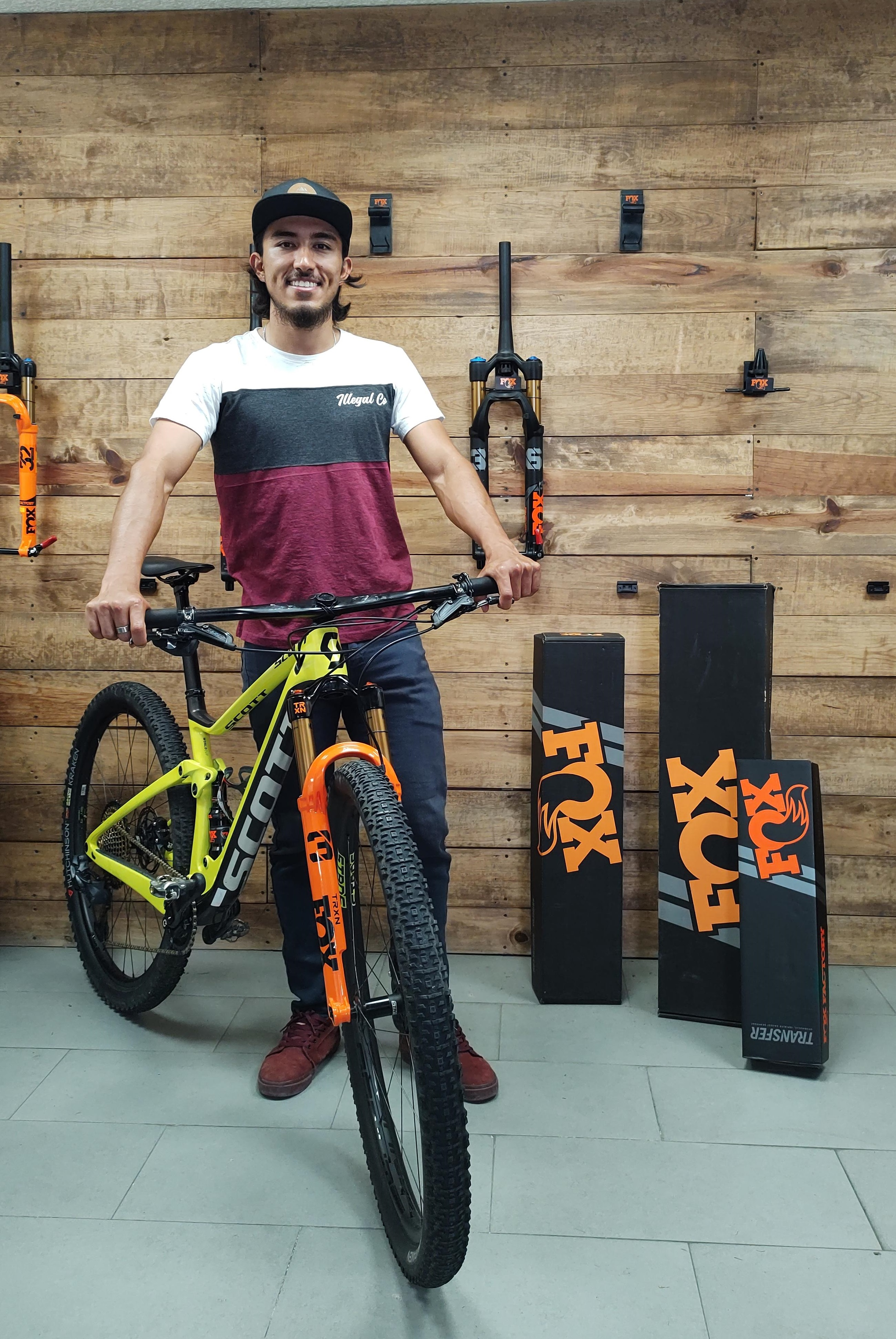
- Ulloa before the Tokyo Olympics

Personal information
- Full name: José Gerardo Ulloa Arévalo
- Nickname: Gera
- Born: 19 October 1996 (age 29) Guadalajara, Jalisco, Mexico

Cycling career
- Sport: Cycling
- Current team: MASSI UCI MTB Team
- Disciplines: Mountain bike, road
- Role: Rider

Professional teams
- 2015-????: A.R.Pro Cycling Teams
- ????-present: Aquiles MD Pro team
Medal record
Representing Mexico
Men's mountain bike racing
Pan American Games
Gold medal – first place	2019 Lima	Cross-country

José Gerardo Ulloa Arévalo (born 19 October 1996) is a Mexican road and mountain bike racing cyclist.

== Major results ==
=== Mountain bike ===
2013
1st Cross-country, National Junior Championships
1st Cross-country, Pan American Junior Championships
2014
1st Cross-country, Pan American Junior Championships
2016
2nd Cross-country, Pan American Under-23 Championships
2017
Pan American Championships

1st Under-23 Cross-country
1st Team relay

1st Cross-country, National Under-23 Championships
2018
Pan American Championships

1st Under-23 Cross-country
3rd Team relay

1st Cross-country, Central American and Caribbean Games
UCI Under-23 XCO World Cup

3rd Mont-Sainte-Anne

2019
1st Cross-country, Pan American Games
1st Cross-country, National Championships
2nd Cross-country, Pan American Championships
2020
1st Cross-country, National Championships
UCI XCC World Cup

1st Nové Město

2021
National Championships

1st Cross-country
1st Short track

2022
Pan American Championships

1st Short track
1st Team relay
2nd Cross-country

UCI XCC World Cup

2nd Mont-Sainte-Anne

2023
Pan American Championships

1st Short track
1st Cross-country

XCO French Cup

3rd Lons-le-Saunier

=== Road ===
2018
8th Overall Vuelta a Michoacán

1st Young rider classification
1st Stage 3

2020
2nd Road race, National Road Championships
2021
1st Overall El Tour de Tucson
