= Isabella Holmgren =

Canadian racing cyclist (born 2005)

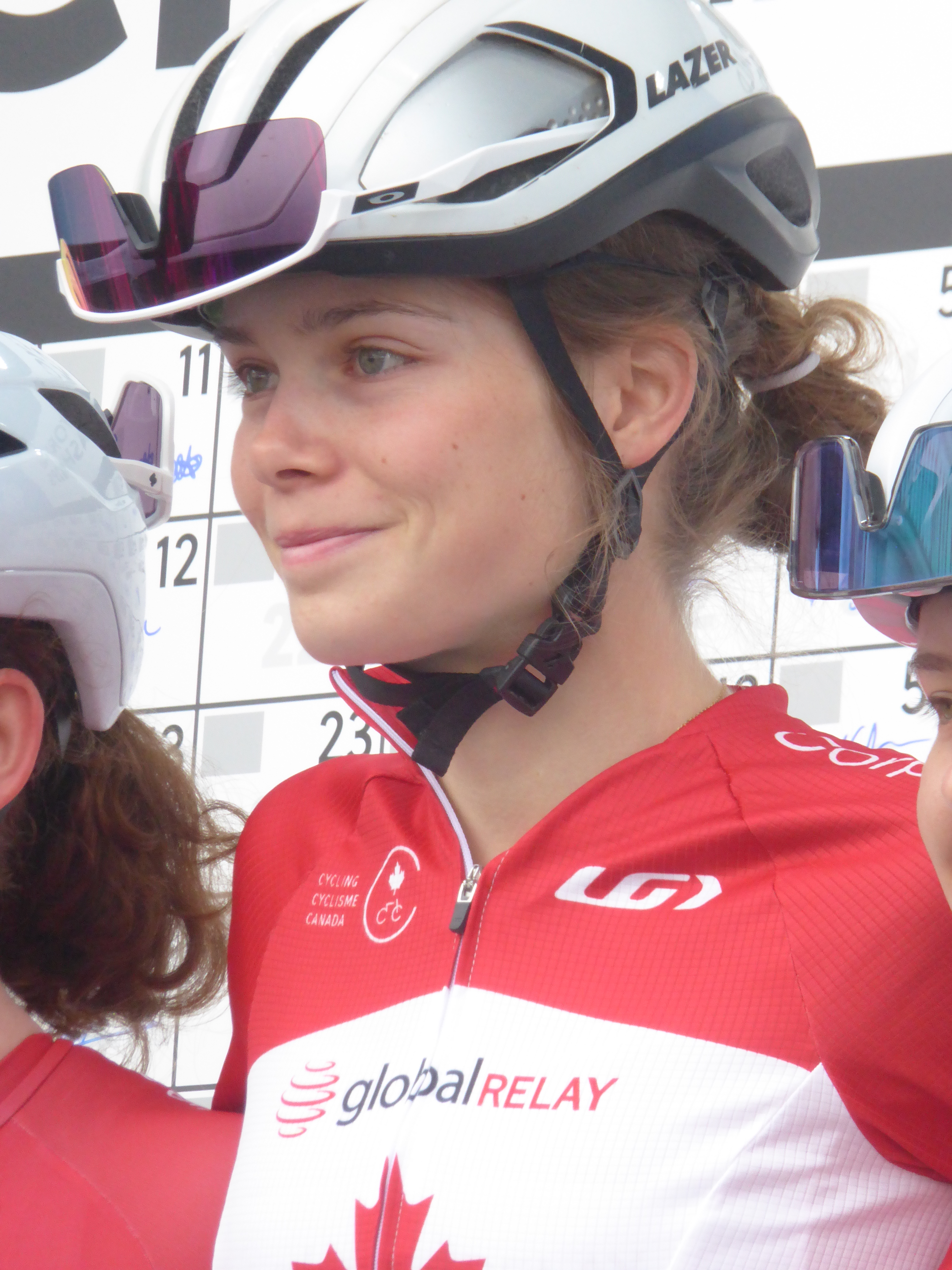
- Holmgren in 2023

Personal information
- Born: 22 May 2005 (age 21) Oro-Medonte, Ontario, Canada

Cycling career
- Sport: Cycling
- Current team: Lidl–Trek
- Disciplines: Road; Cyclo-cross; Mountain biking
- Role: Rider

Amateur team
- 2022–2023: Stimulus Orbea Racing Team

Professional team
- 2024–: Lidl–Trek

Major wins
- Major Tours Giro d'Italia Young rider classification (2026)
Medal record
Representing Canada
Women's mountain biking
UCI Mountain Bike World Championships
Gold medal – first place	2023 Glasgow	Junior Cross-country
Gold medal – first place	2024 Vallnord	U23 cross-country
Gold medal – first place	2024 Vallnord	U–23 cross-country short track

Isabella Holmgren (born 22 May 2005) is a Canadian professional racing cyclist, who currently rides for UCI Women's WorldTour Team Lidl–Trek. Her twin sister Ava and her older brother Gunnar are also professional cyclists.

In 2026, Holmgren won the young rider classification at the Giro d'Italia Women after finishing in the top 10 on four stages and taking 7th place overall.

== Career ==
At the 2023 UCI Mountain Bike World Championships Holmgren won the gold medal in the Junior Cross-country event. In June 2024, Holmgren was named to Canada's 2024 Olympic team.

== Major results ==
=== Cyclo-cross ===
2021–2022
Junior USCX Series

1st Iowa City
1st Mason II

Junior New England Series

1st Northampton I
2nd Northampton II

2nd Junior Waterloo
2nd Junior Hendersonville I
3rd Pan American Junior Championships
3rd Junior Gullegem
2022–2023
1st UCI World Junior Championships
1st National Junior Championships
Junior X²O Badkamers Trophy

1st Baal
3rd Herentals

Junior USCX Series

1st Falmouth II
2nd Rochester I
2nd Rochester II
3rd Falmouth I

1st Langford
1st Junior Fayetteville
UCI Junior World Cup

2nd Benidorm
3rd Besançon
3rd Zonhoven

2nd Junior Waterloo
3rd Pan American Junior Championships
2023–2024
1st Pan American Championships
1st National Under-23 Championships
1st Victoria
1st Mason II
Junior USCX Series

2nd Rochester II
3rd Indianapolis I
3rd Indianapolis II

2nd Mason I
2nd Missoula
4th UCI World Under-23 Championships
2024–2025
1st National Championships
2nd Pan American Championships
5th UCI World Under-23 Championships

=== Mountain bike ===
2023
1st Cross-country, UCI World Junior Championships
UCI Junior Series

1st Canmore
1st Dieppe
2nd Oro Station

2024
1st Cross-country, UCI World Under-23 Championships
UCI Under-23 XCO World Cup

1st Nové Město
1st Val di Sole
1st Les Gets

UCI Under-23 XCC World Cup

1st Nové Město
1st Les Gets
2nd Val di Sole

Shimano Super Cup

1st Sabiñánigo

Czech MTB Cup

1st Zadov

2025
UCI World Under-23 Championships

1st Cross-country
1st Short track

UCI Under-23 XCO World Cup

1st Araxá I
1st Araxá II
1st Mont-Sainte-Anne
3rd Les Gets

UCI Under-23 XCC World Cup

1st Araxá I
1st Araxá II
1st Mont-Sainte-Anne
2nd Nové Město

=== Road ===
2023
National Junior Championships

2nd Time trial
4th Road race

4th Overall Tour du Gévaudan Occitanie
6th Overall Bizkaikoloreak
8th Road race, UCI World Junior Championships
2024
2nd Overall Tour de l'Avenir

1st Mountains classification

3rd Time trial, National Under-23 Championships
2025
1st Overall Tour de l'Avenir

1st Mountains classification
1st Young rider classification
1st Prologue, Stages 5a & 5b (ITT)

1st Durango-Durango
6th Road race, UCI World Under-23 Championships
7th Overall Giro d'Italia
2026
6th Liège–Bastogne–Liège
7th Overall Giro d'Italia

1st Young rider classification

8th Overall Tour de France

Combativity award Stage 10

9th La Flèche Wallonne
