= Cycling at the 2022 Commonwealth Games – Women's cross-country =

Cycling – Women's cross-country at the 2022 Commonwealth Games
- Venue: Cannock Chase Forest
- Dates: 3 August
- Competitors: 8 from 7 nations

Medalists
gold medal	Evie Richards	England
silver medal	Zoe Cuthbert	Australia
bronze medal	Candice Lill	South Africa

The women's cross country mountain biking competition at the 2022 Commonwealth Games in Birmingham, England will be held on 3 August in the Cannock Chase Forest.

== Schedule ==
The schedule is as follows:

Date	Time	Round
Wednesday 3 August 2022	14:00	Race

All times are British Summer Time (UTC+1).

== Results ==
The results were as follows:

Rank	Name	Time	Behind
1st place, gold medalist(s)	Evie Richards (ENG)	1:34:59	—
2nd place, silver medalist(s)	Zoe Cuthbert (AUS)	1:35:46	+0:47
3rd place, bronze medalist(s)	Candice Lill (RSA)	1:36:12	+1:13
4	Isla Short (SCO)	1:37:07	+2:08
5	Kimberley le Court de Billot (MRI)	1:43:57	+8:58
6	Nancy Akinyi Debe (KEN)	2 LAP	—
7	Lisa Mansell (JEY)	2 LAP	—
—	Emily Bridson (JEY)	DNF	—
