= Katharina Sadnik =

Austrian cyclist (born 2003)

Personal information
- Born: 27 October 2003 (age 22)

Cycling career
- Sport: Cycling
- Disciplines: Mountain biking Road

Professional team
- 2026: Visma–Lease a Bike

Major wins
- One-day races and Classics National Road Race Championships (2026)

Katharina Sadnik (born 27 October 2003) is an Austrian mountain and road cyclist who rides for Visma–Lease a Bike. She is the 2026 Austrian road race champion, winning in a sprint against Christina Schweinberger.

In 2025, Sadnik was the Under-23 Short Track champion of the 2025 UCI Mountain Bike World Cup, also winning an individual Under-23 race in Pal, Andorra.

== Major results ==
=== Mountain bike ===
2025
1st Overall UCI XCC Under-23 World Cup

1st Pal–Arinsal

=== Road ===
2026
1st Austrian National Road Race Championships
5th Festival Elsy Jacobs
6th IXINA Leeuw-Oetingen p/b Lotto
