= Cycling at the 2023 Pan American Games – Men's cross-country =

Men's cross-country at the 2023 Pan American Games
- Venue: San Cristóbal Metropolitan Park
- Date: 21 October 2023
- Competitors: 18 from 10 nations
- Winning time: 1:17:56

Medalists
Gold medal	Gunnar Holmgren	Canada
Silver medal	Martín Vidaurre	Chile
Bronze medal	José Gabriel Marques	Brazil

The men's cross-country competition of the cycling events at the 2023 Pan American Games was held on 21 October 2023 at the San Cristóbal Metropolitan Park in Santiago, Chile.

== Schedule ==
Date	Time	Round
21 October 2023	9:00	Final

== Results ==
Rank	Rider	Nation	Time
1st place, gold medalist(s)	Gunnar Holmgren	Canada	1:17:59
2nd place, silver medalist(s)	Martín Vidaurre	Chile	1:18:52
3rd place, bronze medalist(s)	Jose Gabriel Marques	Brazil	1:20:13
4	Ulan Bastos	Brazil	1:20:31
5	Diego Arias	Colombia	1:20:35
6	Adair Gutierrez	Mexico	1:21:10
7	Andrés Soto	Argentina	1:21:44
8	Joel Contreras	Argentina	1:22:01
9	Ignacio Gallo	Chile	1:22:11
10	Hilvar Malaver	Colombia	1:23:42
11	Georwill Perez	Puerto Rico	1:25:20
12	Amando Martinez	Mexico	1:25:45
13	Alexander Urbina	Peru	1:25:47
14	Luis Lopez	Honduras	1:26:59
15	Paolo Montoya	Costa Rica	1:27:07
16	Sebastián Miranda	Chile	1:27:19
	Jonathan Quesada	Costa Rica	DNF
	Carter Woods	Canada	DNF
