= Mathis Azzaro =

French cyclist (born 2000)

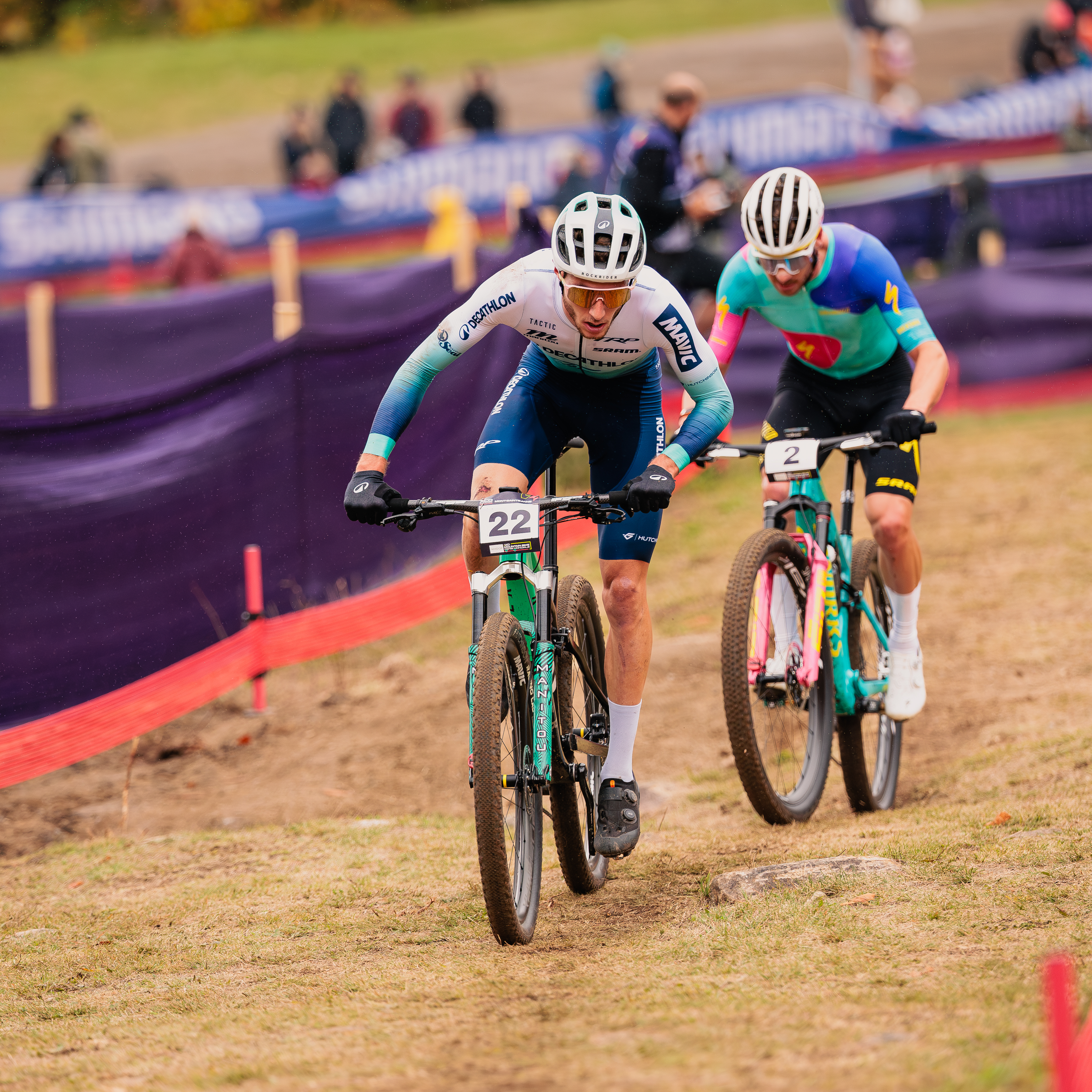

Personal information
- Born: 11 May 2000 (age 26)
- Height: 1.84 m (6 ft 0 in)
- Weight: 70 kg (154 lb)

Cycling career
- Sport: Cycling
- Current team: Decathlon Ford Racing Team; AVC Aix-en-Provence
- Discipline: Mountain bike
- Role: Rider

Amateur team
- 2023–: AVC Aix-en-Provence (road)

Professional teams
- 2019–2021: Absolute–Absalon
- 2022: BMC MTB Racing
- 2023: Rockrider Racing Team
- 2024–: Decathlon Ford Racing Team
Medal record
Representing France
World Championships
Gold medal – first place	2020 Leogang	Team relay
Gold medal – first place	2021 Val di Sole	Team relay
Silver medal – second place	2022 Les Gets	Under-23 Cross country
Silver medal – second place	2024 Pal Arinsal	Team relay
Bronze medal – third place	2018 Lenzerheide	Junior Cross country
Bronze medal – third place	2017 Cairns	Team relay
European Championships
Silver medal – second place	2020 Monte Tamaro	Mixed relay

Mathis Azzaro (born 11 May 2000) is a French cross-country mountain biker. In 2024, he won the French national cross-country short track championships.

== Major results ==
2017
3rd Cross-country, National Junior Championships
3rd Team relay, UCI World Championships
2018
3rd Cross-country, UCI World Junior Championships
2020
1st Team relay, UCI World Championships
1st Cross-country, National Under-23 Championships
2nd Team relay, UEC European Championships
2021
1st Team relay, UCI World Championships
2nd Cross-country, National Under-23 Championships
2022
UCI World Championships

2nd Under-23 cross-country
2nd Team relay

UCI Under-23 XCO World Cup

3rd Snowshoe

2023
1st Japan XCO Cup
3rd Short track, National Championships
2024
1st Short track, National Championships
UCI XCO World Cup

3rd Val di Sole
5th Nové Mesto

5th Cross-country, UCI World Championships
2025
National Championships

2nd Cross-country
2nd Short track

UCI XCO World Cup

2nd Nové Město
2nd Val di Sole
3rd Lake Placid
3rd Mont-Sainte-Anne
4th Leogang
4th Pal–Arinsal

3rd Short track, UCI World Championships
UCI XCC World Cup

3rd Araxá I
3rd Pal–Arinsal
3rd Lake Placid

2026
UCI XCC World Cup

1st Mona Yongpyong
1st Nové Město
