= Cycling at the 2019 Pan American Games – Men's cross-country =

Men's cross-country at the 2019 Pan American Games
- Venue: Morro Solar
- Dates: July 28
- Competitors: 20 from 12 nations
- Winning time: 1:25:03

Medalists
Gold medal	Gerardo Ulloa	Mexico
Silver medal	Henrique Avancini	Brazil
Bronze medal	Martín Vidaurre	Chile

The men's cross-country competition of the cycling events at the 2019 Pan American Games was held on July 28 at the Morro Solar.

== Schedule ==
Date	Time	Round
July 28, 2019	11:30	Final

== Results ==
Rank	Rider	Nation	Time
1st place, gold medalist(s)	Gerardo Ulloa	Mexico	1:25:03
2nd place, silver medalist(s)	Henrique Avancini	Brazil	1:27:08
3rd place, bronze medalist(s)	Martín Vidaurre	Chile	1:27:31
4	Héctor Leonardo Páez	Colombia	1:29:47
5	Guilherme Gotardelo	Brazil	1:30:36
6	Jorge Macías	Argentina	1:30:49
7	Andrey Fonseca	Costa Rica	1:31:00
8	William Tobay	Ecuador	1:32:32
9	Jhonathan de Leon	Guatemala	1:32:48
10	Yonathan Mejía	Venezuela	1:32:57
11	Luis Enrique Lopez	Honduras	1:33:08
12	Sebastián Miranda	Chile	1:34:22
13	Carlos Gerardo Herrera	Costa Rica	1:34:40
14	Georwill Pérez	Puerto Rico	1:34:48
15	Catriel Soto	Argentina	1:35:40
16	Jacob Morales	Puerto Rico	1:35:53
	Cristian Aranzazú	Colombia	DNF
	Alexander Urbina	Peru	DNF
	Rolando Serrano	Peru	DNF
	Jaime Miranda	Mexico	DNF
