= Rónán Dunne =

Irish mountain biker

Personal information
- Born: 22 November 2002 (age 23)

Cycling career
- Sport: Cycling
- Current team: Mondraker Factory Racing
- Discipline: Downhill
- Role: Rider

Professional teams
- 2021–2023: Nukeproof Racing
- 2024–: Mondraker Factory Racing
Medal record
Representing Ireland
Mountain bike racing
World Championships
| Bronze medal – third place | 2025 Champéry | Downhill |

Rónán Dunne (born 22 November 2002) is an Irish downhill mountain biker. In 2025, he finished third in the UCI Downhill World Championships in Champéry, France. He has also won two rounds of the UCI Downhill World Cup, one in 2024 and one in 2025.
