= Marine Cabirou =

French cyclist

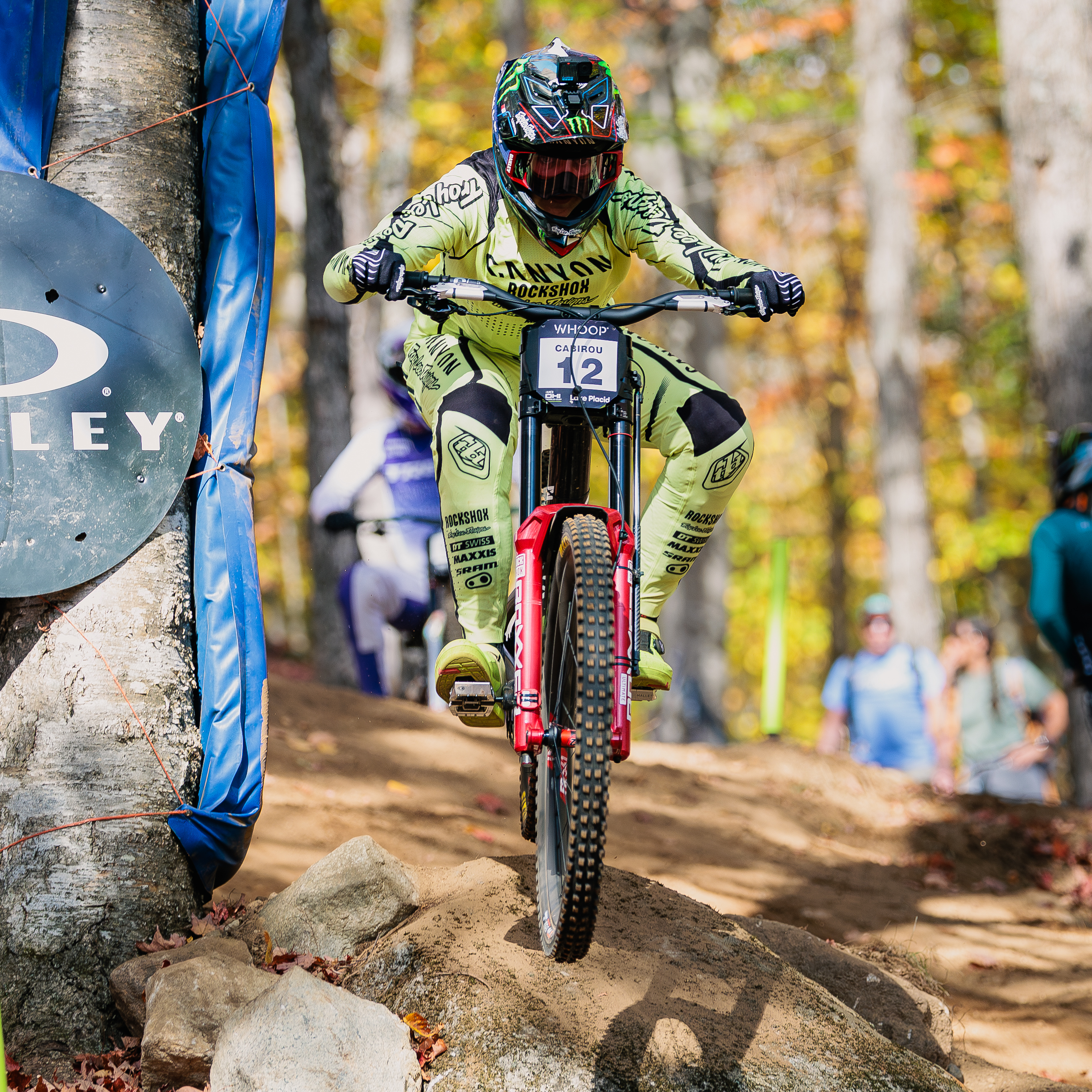

Personal information
- Born: 12 March 1997 (age 29) Millau, France

Cycling career
- Sport: Cycling
- Current team: Canyon CLLCTV Factory Team
- Discipline: Downhill
- Role: Rider

Professional teams
- 2016–2018: Voulvoul Racing
- 2019–2024: Scott Downhill Factory
- 2025–: Canyon CLLCTV Factory Team
Medal record
Representing France
Women's mountain bike racing
World Championships
Gold medal – first place	2015 Vallnord	Junior downhill
Silver medal – second place	2021 Val di Sole	Downhill
Bronze medal – third place	2019 Mont-Saint-Anne	Downhill
Bronze medal – third place	2023 Fort William	Downhill
Bronze medal – third place	2025 Valais	Downhill
Bronze medal – third place	2014 Lillehammer-Hafjell	Junior downhill
European Championships
Gold medal – first place	2016 Wisła	Downhill
Bronze medal – third place	2017 Sestola	Downhill
Bronze medal – third place	2024 Champéry	Downhill

Marine Cabirou (born 12 March 1997) is a French downhill mountain bike racer. She a is a four-time medalist at the UCI World Championships, winning one silver and three bronze medals. She was also the 2016 European downhill champion, won the overall title of the 2020 UCI Downhill World Cup and is a two-time national champion.
