= Henri Kiefer =

German mountain biker

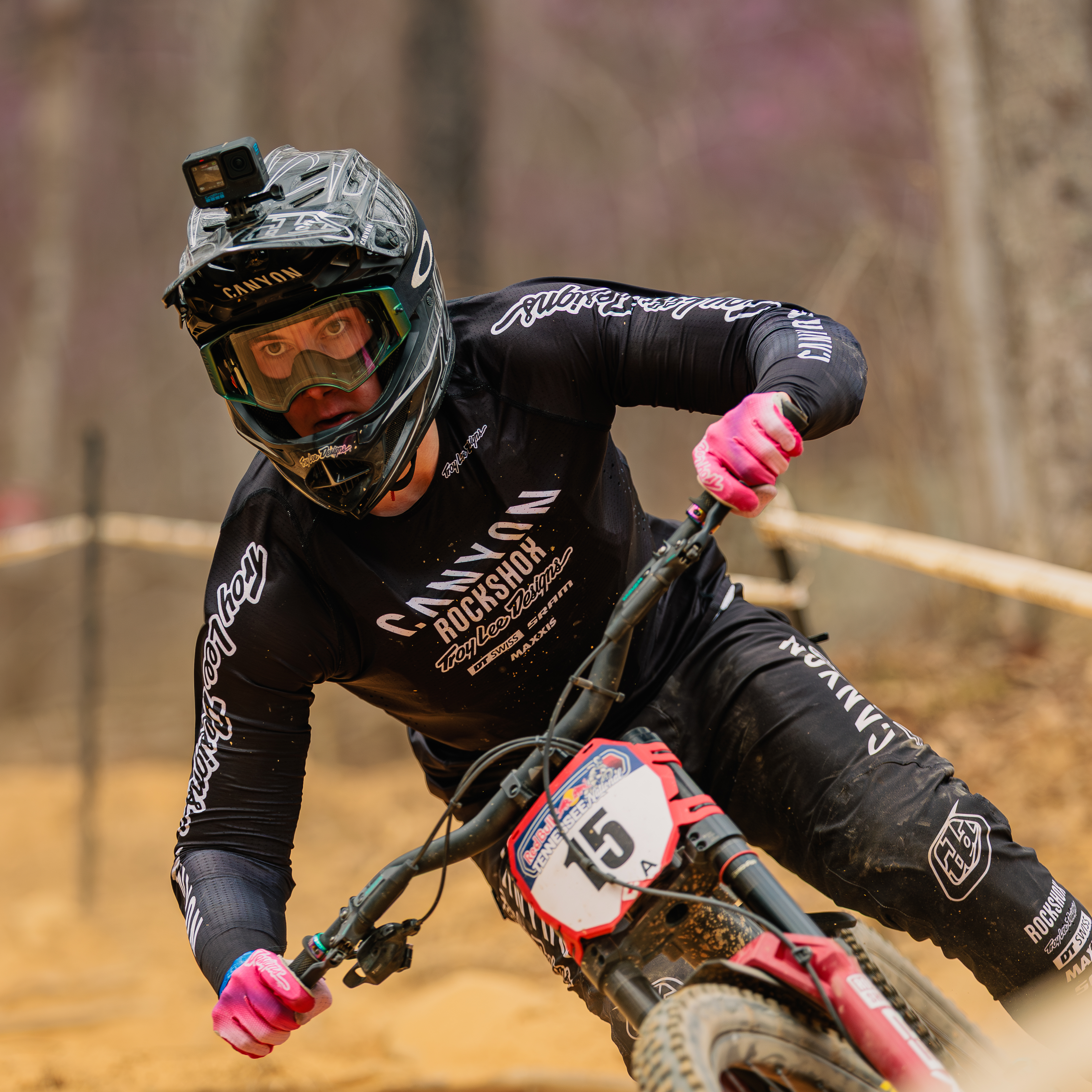
- Kiefer in 2025

Personal information
- Born: 11 May 2005 (age 21)

Cycling career
- Sport: Cycling
- Current team: Canyon CLLCTV Pirelli
- Discipline: Downhill
- Role: Rider

Professional team
- 2022–: Canyon CLLCTV Pirelli
Medal record
Representing Germany
Mountain bike racing
World Championships
Gold medal – first place	2023 Fort William	Junior downhill
Silver medal – second place	2025 Champéry	Downhill

Henri Kiefer (born 11 May 2005) is a German downhill mountain biker. In 2025, he finished second in the UCI Downhill World Championships in Champéry, France. He also won the 2023 junior world championships. He is also a three-time national champion in the discipline.
