= Jackson Goldstone =

Canadian cyclist

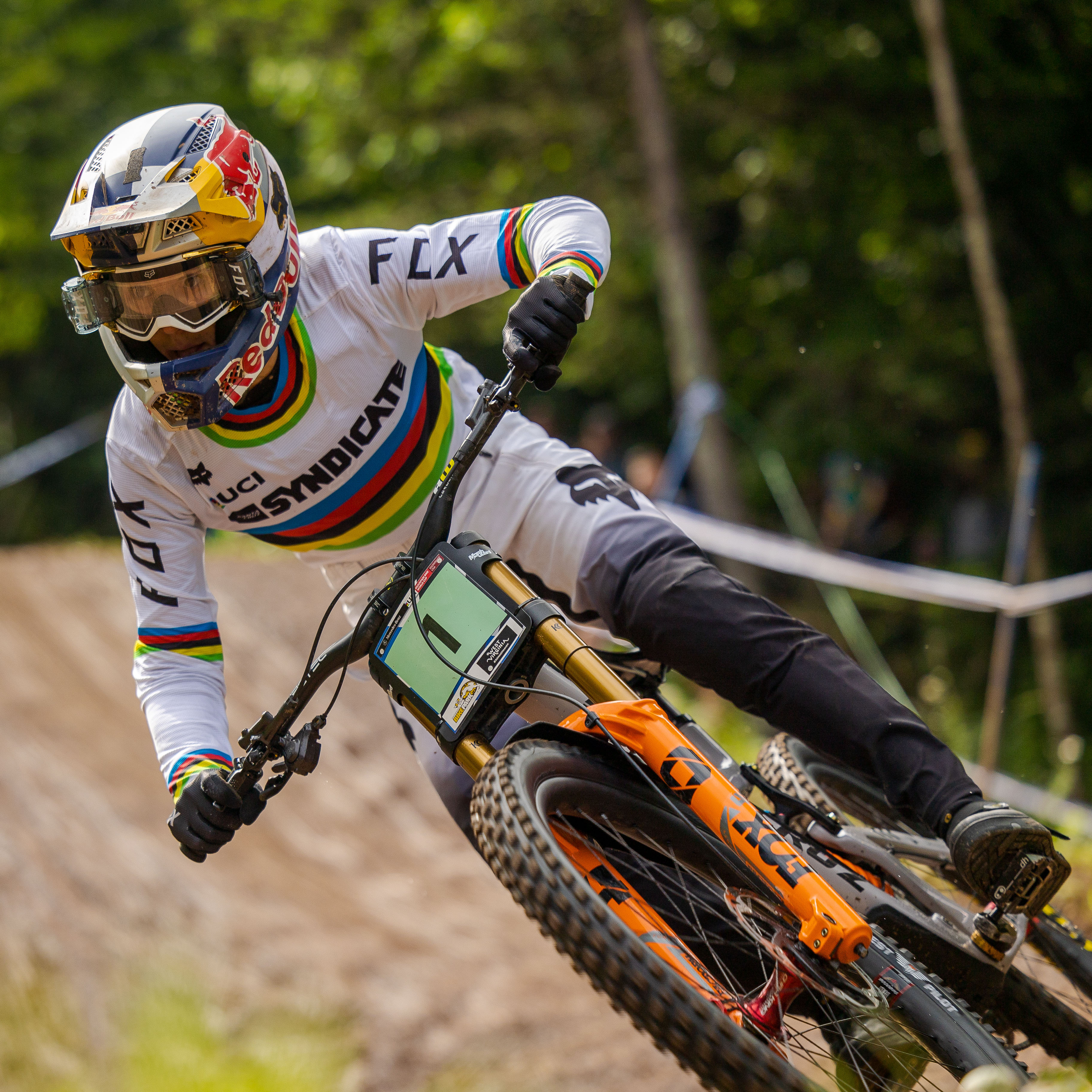

Personal information
- Born: 2 February 2004 (age 22) Squamish, British Columbia, Canada
- Height: 170 cm (5 ft 7 in)

Cycling career
- Sport: Cycling
- Current team: Santa Cruz Syndicate
- Discipline: Mountain biking
- Rider type: Downhill

Amateur team
- 2022-present: Santa Cruz Syndicate

Major wins
- Red Bull Hardline (2025, 2022) Uci elite world championships (2025, 2026)
Medal record
Representing Canada
Men's Mountain Bike Racing
UCI MTB World Cup
Silver medal – second place	2021 Leogang	Junior DH
Gold medal – first place	2021 Les Gets	Junior DH
Gold medal – first place	2021 Maribor	Junior DH
Gold medal – first place	2021 Val di Sole	Junior DH
Gold medal – first place	2021 Lenzerheide	Junior DH
Silver medal – second place	2021 Snowshoe	Junior DH
Gold medal – first place	2022 Lourdes	Junior DH
Silver medal – second place	2022 Fort William	Junior DH
Silver medal – second place	2022 Leogang	Junior DH
Gold medal – first place	2022 Lenzerheide	Junior DH
Gold medal – first place	2022 Vallnord Pal Arinsal	Junior DH
Gold medal – first place	2022 Snowshoe	Junior DH
Gold medal – first place	2022 Mont-Saint-Anne	Junior DH
Gold medal – first place	2023 Val di Sole	Elite DH
Bronze medal – third place	2023 Leogang	Elite DH
Gold medal – first place	2023 Mont-Saint-Anne	Elite DH
Gold medal – first place	2025 Loudenvielle	Elite DH
Gold medal – first place	2025 Leogang	Elite DH
Gold medal – first place	2025 Val di Sole	Elite DH
Gold medal – first place	2025 La Thuile	Elite DH
Gold medal – first place	2025 Mont Sainte Anne	Elite DH

Jackson Goldstone (born 10 February 2004) is a Canadian cyclist from Squamish, British Columbia competing in Downhill mountain biking. He won the Junior Downhill 2021 UCI Mountain Bike World Championships in Val di Sole, Italy, the 2022 Junior World Cup Overall title, and the 2025 World Championship in Champery, Switzerland.

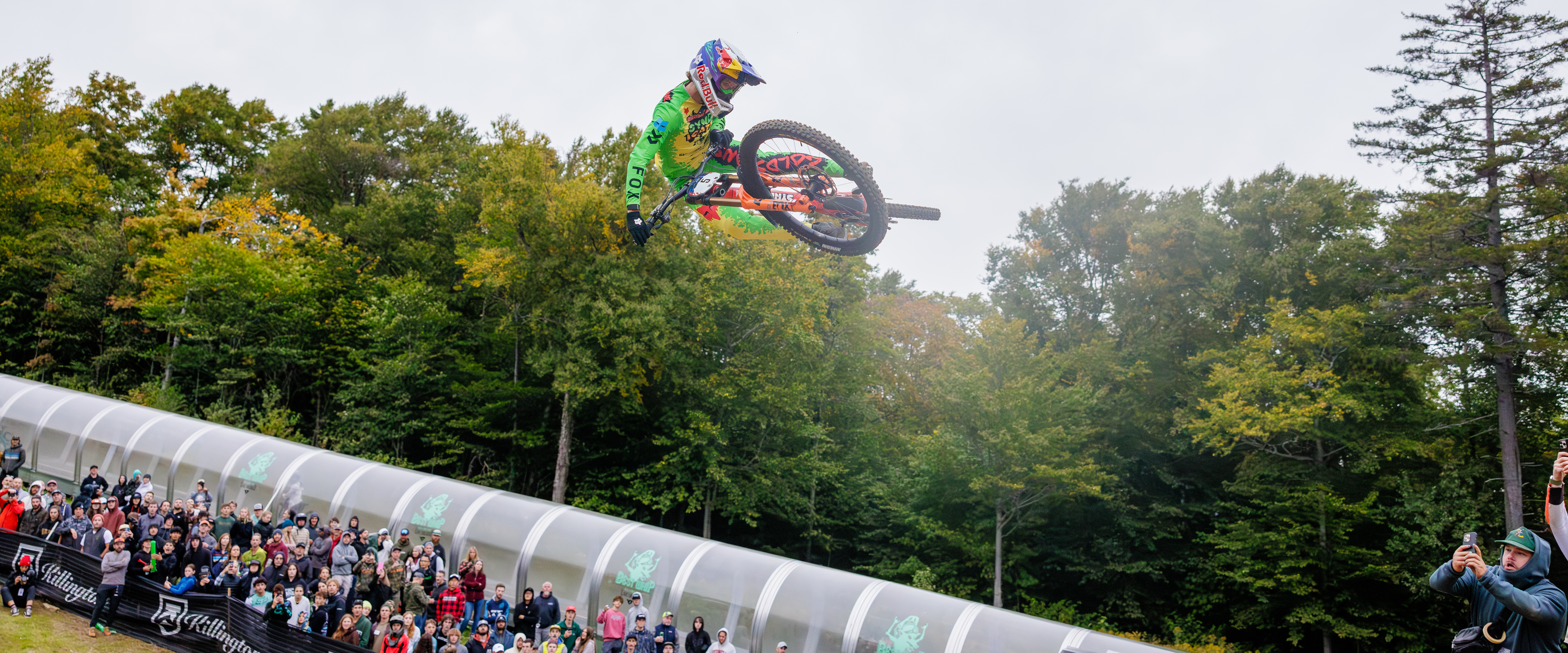
Competing in the Best Whip contest at Killington Bike Park in 2023

== Reception ==
On September 11, 2022, Goldstone won the Red Bull Hardline in Dyfi, Wales. Goldstone completed the revamped Hardline course in two minutes and twenty seconds, finishing six-and-a-half seconds clear of Joe Smith in second place. At 18 years old, Goldstone is the event's youngest winner.

On October 11, 2025. Jackson won the UCI Elite Men's DH World Cup Overall title after completing a first-place finish in Mont Sainte Anne. His rival, Loic Bruni, did not show up to the start gate because of an injury he sustained earlier that day during a practice run. This made Jackson the second Canadian to ever win the UCI Elite Men's DH World Cup Overall, the only other being Steve Smith.
