= Valentina Höll =

Austrian downhill mountain biker (born 2001)

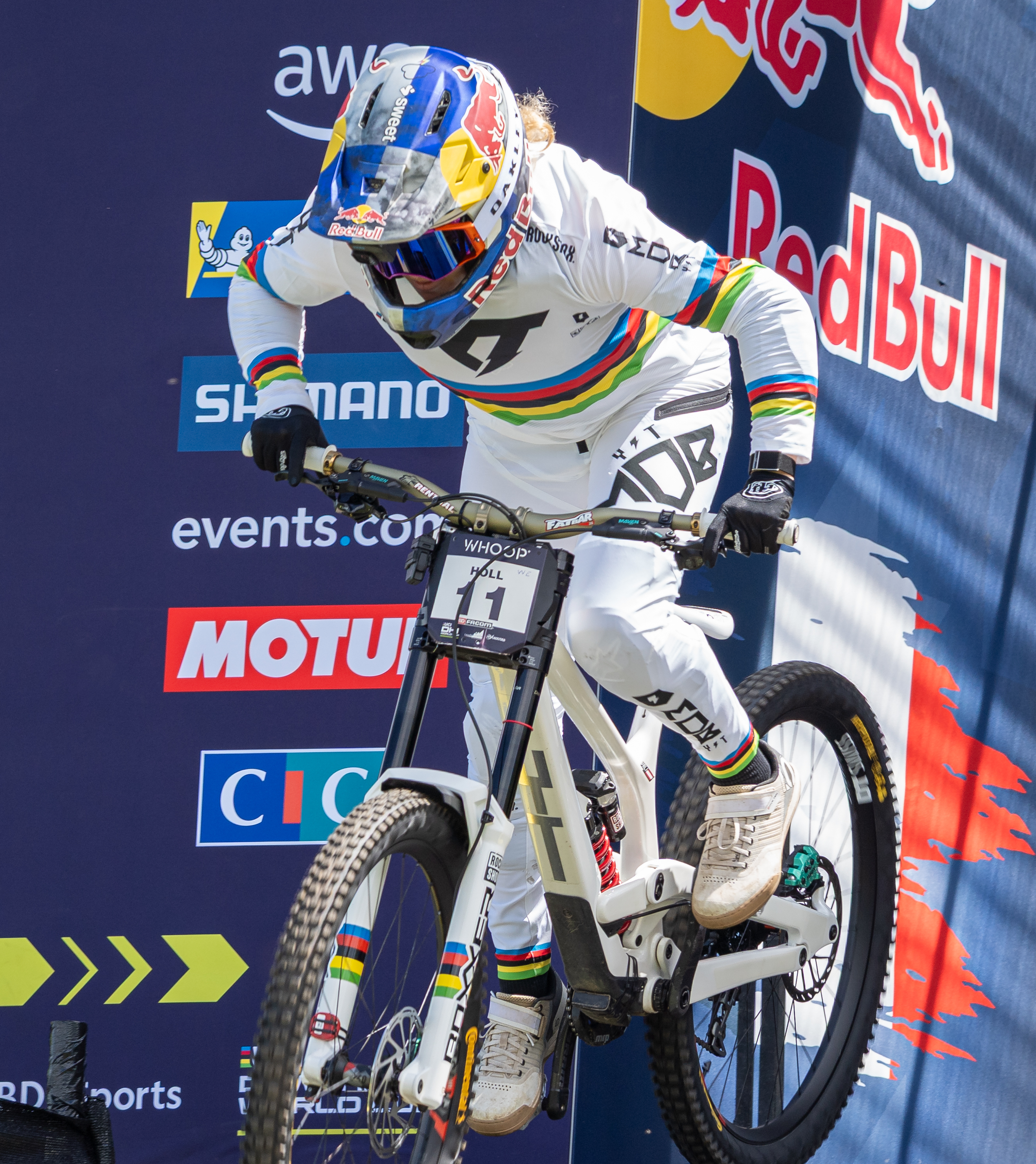
- Valentina Höll at 2025 (AUT)

Personal information
- Full name: Valentina Höll
- Nickname: Vali
- Born: December 11, 2001 (age 24) Salzburg, Austria

Cycling career
- Sport: Cycling
- Current team: Commencal Schwalbe by Les Orres
- Discipline: Mountain bike (downhill)
- Role: Rider
- Rider type: Downhill

Professional teams
- 2021–2023: RockShox Trek Race Team
- 2024–2025: YT Mob
- 2026-: Commencal Schwalbe by Les Orres

Valentina Höll
Medal record

Women's downhill mountain bike

Representing Austria
Gold medal – first place	2022 Les Gets	Women's downhill
Gold medal – first place	2023 Fort William	Women's downhill
Gold medal – first place	2024 Pal Arinsal	Women's downhill
Gold medal – first place	2025 Champéry	Women's downhill

Valentina "Vali" Höll (born 11 December 2001) is an Austrian professional downhill mountain biker. She is a four-time UCI Downhill World Champion (2022–2025) and four-time UCI Mountain Bike World Cup overall winner (2021, 2023, 2024, and 2025). Known for her precision, flow, and composure under pressure, Höll is considered one of the most dominant riders in modern women's downhill.

== Early life ==
Höll was born in Salzburg, Austria, and raised near the resort town of Saalbach-Hinterglemm. Surrounded by alpine terrain, she began mountain biking at age 12 and soon displayed natural downhill skill.

In 2016, she was signed by the YT Mob development program while still in secondary school, marking one of the earliest professional youth contracts in downhill history.

== Junior career (2017–2019) ==
Höll's junior results were unprecedented. In 2018, she won every round of the UCI Junior World Cup and captured the Junior World Championship in Lenzerheide, Switzerland. She repeated both titles in 2019 at Mont-Sainte-Anne, Canada, completing two perfect junior seasons and finishing unbeaten at World Cup level.

== Elite career ==
=== 2021 – Rookie breakthrough ===
After pandemic delays postponed her elite debut, Höll entered the 2021 season with the RockShox Trek Race Team. She secured multiple podiums and swept both finals at Snowshoe, West Virginia, earning the 2021 UCI World Cup Overall in her rookie year at age 19.

=== 2022–2025 dominance ===
From 2022 onward, Höll has remained unbeaten at the World Championships and repeatedly topped the overall standings:

- 2022 – World Champion, Les Gets (FRA)
- 2023 – World Champion, Fort William (GBR)
- 2024 – World Champion, Pal Arinsal (AND)
- 2025 – World Champion, Champéry (SUI) – time 3:27.506 (+0.667 on Myriam Nicole)

She claimed three consecutive World Cup overall titles (2023–2025), sealing the 2025 series crown at Lake Placid (Whiteface, USA). Across this period, she logged more than a dozen World Cup race wins and podiums at Fort William, Loudenvielle, Val di Sole, and Andorra.

In 2024 she returned to the YT Mob, racing on the updated YT Tues 29 CF after three seasons with Trek.

== Riding style ==
Höll is renowned for her composed, low-centered riding stance and seamless cornering technique. She carries exceptional speed through steep, natural tracks and is known for maintaining momentum where others brake heavily. Her runs often exhibit minimal body movement, a result of years of balance training and alpine terrain familiarity. Observers frequently compare her control and focus to that of former champion Rachel Atherton.

== Career records ==
As of October 2025, Höll's record includes:

- 4 × Elite World Champion (2022–2025)
- 4 × UCI World Cup Overall Champion (2021, 2023, 2024, 2025)
- 13 + UCI World Cup race wins (through Lake Placid 2025)
- 2 × Junior World Champion (2018, 2019)
- 2 × Junior World Cup Overall Champion (2018, 2019)

Her four-year streak of Elite World Championship golds equals the longest consecutive run in women's downhill history, matching Anne-Caroline Chausson's 1996–1999 record.

== Major results ==
=== Elite ===
- 2026 – {{{1}}} World Championships, Val di Sole (ITA); World Cup Overall Champion
- 2025 – {{{1}}} World Championships, Champéry (SUI); World Cup Overall Champion
- 2024 – {{{1}}} World Championships, Pal Arinsal (AND); World Cup Overall Champion
- 2023 – {{{1}}} World Championships, Fort William (GBR); World Cup Overall Champion
- 2022 – {{{1}}} World Championships, Les Gets (FRA)
- 2021 – World Cup Overall Champion (rookie season, snowshoe double win)

=== Junior ===
- 2019 – {{{1}}} World Championships (Mont-Sainte-Anne); World Cup Overall Champion
- 2018 – {{{1}}} World Championships (Lenzerheide); World Cup Overall Champion (won every round)

== Teams ==
- 2026–present – Commencal Schwalbe by Les Orres
- 2024–2025 – YT Mob
- 2021–2023 – RockShox Trek Race Team
- 2018–2019 – YT Mob

== Career statistics ==
Season	Team	World Cup overall	World Championship result	Wins
2025	YT Mob	1st	1st (Champéry)	3
2024	YT Mob	1st	1st (Pal Arinsal)	4
2023	RockShox Trek Race Team	1st	1st (Fort William)	3
2022	RockShox Trek Race Team	2nd	1st (Les Gets)	2
2021	RockShox Trek Race Team	1st	–	2

== Legacy ==
Höll's combination of dominance at a young age, longevity, and technical precision has led many analysts to describe her as the heir to Rachel Atherton's legacy. Her consistent success has also contributed to Austria's growing prominence in international mountain biking.

== Personal life ==
Höll was born in Salzburg, Austria, and grew up in a ski lodge built by her grandparents. She began racing locally, competing against the boys. She currently lives in Saalbach, Austria.
