= 2024 UCI Mountain Bike Marathon World Championships – Women's race =

Women's race
2024 UCI Mountain Bike Marathon World Championships

Race details
- Dates: 22 September 2024
- Distance: 104 km (64.62 mi)
- Winning time: 5:15.06

Medalists
	Gold	Mona Mitterwallner; Austria
	Silver	Sina Frei; Switzerland
	Bronze	Candice Lill; South Africa

The women's race at the 2024 UCI Mountain Bike Marathon World Championships took place in Snowshoe, United States on 22 September 2024.

== Result ==
Rank	Rider	Nation	Time	Diff.
1st place, gold medalist(s)	Mona Mitterwallner	Austria	5:15:06	
2nd place, silver medalist(s)	Sina Frei	Switzerland	5:15:32	+ 0:26
3rd place, bronze medalist(s)	Candice Lill	South Africa	5:16:16	+ 1:09
4	Jolanda Neff	Switzerland	5:20:16	+ 5:09
5	Laura Stigger	Austria	5:26:19	+ 11:12
6	Sofía Gómez Villafañe	Argentina	5:31:03	+ 15:57
7	Vera Looser	Namibia	5:31:35	+ 16:28
8	Tessa Kortekaas	Netherlands	5:31:37	+ 16:30
9	Alexis Skarda	United States	5:36:07	+ 21:00
10	Rosa Van Doorn	Netherlands	5:36:29	+ 21:22
11	Janina Wüst	Switzerland	5:42:46	+ 27:39
12	Claudia Peretti	Italy	5:43:41	+ 28:34
13	Debora Piana	Italy	5:45:16	+ 30:09
14	Irina Luetzelschwab	Switzerland	5:50:02	+ 34:55
15	Terese Andersson	Sweden	5:51:00	+ 35:53
16	Hannah Otto	United States	5:52:22	+ 37:15
17	Crystal Anthony	United States	5:57:47	+ 42:41
18	Courtney Sherwell	Australia	5:59:25	+ 44:18
19	Margot Moschetti	France	6:00:32	+ 45:25
20	Raiza Goulão	Brazil	6:00:45	+ 45:39
21	Amy Henchoz	Great Britain	6:00:51	+ 45:44
22	Martina Krahulcová	Slovakia	6:01:32	+ 46:25
23	Merili Sirvel	Estonia	6:01:52	+ 46:45
24	Natalia Fischer Egusquiza	Spain	6:12:08	+ 57:01
25	Ella Bloor	Australia	6:15:21	+ 1:00:14
26	Janelle Uibokand	Estonia	6:15:54	+ 1:00:47
27	Janka Keseg Števková	Slovakia	6:16:54	+ 1:01:48
28	Stefanie Walter	Germany	6:21:26	+ 1:06:19
29	Britt Mason	United States	6:25:56	+ 1:10:50
30	Sandra Stadelmann	Switzerland	6:27:25	+ 1:12:19
31	Kim Baptista	Great Britain	6:31:58	+ 1:16:51
32	Manuela Muresan	Romania	6:32:17	+ 1:17:10
33	Daphne Jones	Great Britain	6:51:10	+ 1:36:03
34	Starla Teddergreen	United States	OTL	
35	Hannah Shell	United States	OTL	
36	Adelheid Morath	Germany	OTL	
37	Marinette Martin	Switzerland	OTL	
38	Abigail Snyder	United States	OTL	
39	Nicola Freitas	South Africa	OTL	
40	Lauren Zimmer	United States	OTL	
41	Melissa Seek	United States	OTL	
	Haley Batten	United States	DNF	
	Simone Berger	United States	DNF	
	Lejla Njemčević	Bosnia and Herzegovina	DNF	
	Peta Mullens	Australia	DNF	
