= 2023 UCI Mountain Bike Marathon World Championships – Women's race =

Women's race
2023 UCI Mountain Bike Marathon World Championships

Race details
- Dates: 6 August 2023
- Distance: 96.5 km (59.96 mi)
- Winning time: 5:07:50

Medalists
	Gold	Mona Mitterwallner; Australia
	Silver	Candice Lill; South Africa
	Bronze	Adelheid Morath; Germany

The women's race at the 2023 UCI Mountain Bike Marathon World Championships took place in Glentress Forest, Scotland on 6 August 2023.

== Result ==
Rank	Rider	Nation	Time	Diff.
1st place, gold medalist(s)	Mona Mitterwallner	Australia	5:07:50	
2nd place, silver medalist(s)	Candice Lill	South Africa	5:08:44	+ 0:54
3rd place, bronze medalist(s)	Adelheid Morath	Germany	5:17:40	+ 9:50
4	Lejla Njemčević	Bosnia and Herzegovina	5:20:32	+ 12:42
5	Estelle Morel	France	5:20:38	+ 12:48
6	Samara Sheppard	New Zealand	5:23:20	+ 15:30
7	Vera Looser	Namibia	5:25:42	+ 17:52
8	Paula Gorycka	Poland	5:26:29	+ 18:39
9	Sandra Mairhoffer	Italy	5:27:07	+ 19:17
10	Kimberley Le Court	Mauritius	5:27:16	+ 19:26
11	Terese Andersson	Sweden	5:27:35	+ 19:45
12	Aleksandra Andrzejewska	Poland	5:30:58	+ 23:08
13	Katazina Sosna	Lithuania	5:31:51	+ 24:01
14	Irina Luetzelschwab	Switzerland	5:33:19	+ 25:29
15	Haley Smith	Canada	5:37:37	+ 29:47
16	Bettina Janas	Germany	5:39:51	+ 32:01
17	Kim Ames	Germany	5:40:46	+ 32:56
18	Monica Calderón	Colombia	5:41:56	+ 34:06
19	Stefanie Dohrn	Germany	5:43:05	+ 35:15
20	Margot Moschetti	France	5:43:05	+ 35:15
21	Karla Loffelmann	Czech Republic	5:44:46	+ 36:56
22	Maghalie Rochette	Canada	5:47:53	+ 40:03
23	Janina Wust	Switzerland	5:49:41	+ 41:51
24	Manuela Muresan	Romania	5:51:48	+ 43:58
25	Janelle Uibokand	Estonia	5:52:35	+ 44:45
26	Meritxell Figueras Garangou	Spain	5:52:35	+ 44:45
27	Isla Short	United Kingdom	5:53:27	+ 45:37
28	Amy Henchoz	United Kingdom	5:54:09	+ 46:19
29	Kelly Catale	United States	5:54:56	+ 47:06
30	Michalina Ziolkowska	Poland	5:56:00	+ 48:10
31	Joanne Thom	United Kingdom	6:08:05	+ 1:00:15
32	Anna Kay	United Kingdom	6:12:06	+ 1:04:16
33	Daniela Hofler	Germany	6:13:01	+ 1:05:11
34	Sarah Hill	South Africa	6:13:50	+ 1:06:00
35	Christina Wiejak	United Kingdom	6:14:55	+ 1:07:05
36	Kim Baptista	United Kingdom	6:17:28	+ 1:09:38
37	Sophie Johnson	United Kingdom	6:20:57	+ 1:13:07
38	Jessica Cruz Carrera	Andorra	6:21:12	+ 1:13:22
39	Sandra Stadelmann	Switzerland	6:22:09	+ 1:14:19
40	Sophie Giovane	France	6:25:55	+ 1:18:05
41	Nikol Flašarová	Czech Republic	6:27:03	+ 1:19:13
42	Jane Barr	United Kingdom	6:30:23	+ 1:22:33
43	Kerry Jago	United Kingdom	6:33:35	+ 1:25:45
44	Sharn Hooper	United Kingdom	6:38:54	+ 1:31:04
45	Elodie Kuijper	Netherlands	6:39:44	+ 1:31:54
46	Daphne Jones	United Kingdom	6:50:42	+ 1:42:52
47	Charlotte Welter	France	6:52:09	+ 1:44:19
48	Evelyn Sulzer	Austria	7:01:58	+ 1:54:08
49	Abigail Snyder	United States	7:02:34	+ 1:54:44
50	Rachel Connerney	United Kingdom	7:04:12	+ 1:56:22
51	Nancy Akinyi	Kenya	7:46:34	+ 2:38:44
	Claudia Peretti	Italy	DNF	
	Marcella Mahfuz Toldi	Brazil	DNF	
	Greta Karasiovaitė	Lithuania	DNF	
	Larissa Rossner	Switzerland	DNF	
