= 2021 UCI Mountain Bike Marathon World Championships – Women's race =

Women's race at the 2021 UCI Mountain Bike Marathon World Championships
- Venue: Elba
- Date: 2 October 2021
- Competitors: 50 from 20 nations

Medalists
gold medal	Mona Mitterwallner	Austria
silver medal	Maja Włoszczowska	Portugal
bronze medal	Natalia Fischer	Spain

Women's race at the 2021 UCI Mountain Bike Marathon World Championships took place in Elba, Italy on 2 October 2021.

== Course ==
The 2021 XCM World Championship was held over a 35 km course with 2 laps plus an initial 2 km lap and a final 8 km lap. In total, the women's race was 80 km with 3,100 metres.

== Result ==
50 competitors from 20 nations started.

40 competitors reached the finish line.

Rank	Athlete	Nation	Result	Behind
1st place, gold medalist(s)	Mona Mitterwallner	Austria	4:48.54,1	
2nd place, silver medalist(s)	Maja Włoszczowska	Poland	4:50.07,4	+1.13,3
3rd place, bronze medalist(s)	Natalia Fischer	Spain	4:56.31,3	+7.36,2
4	Giada Specia	Italy	4:59.32,8	+10.38,7
5	Ariane Lüthi	Switzerland	5:03.14,6	+14.20,5
6	Robyn de Groot	South Africa	5:03.38,0	+14.43,9
7	Alessandra Keller	Switzerland	5:05.26,9	+16.36,8
8	Adelheid Morath	Germany	5:07.40,5	+18.46,4
9	Marika Tovo	Italy	5:09.13,7	+20.19,6
10	Rebecca McConnell	Australia	5:10.18,5	+21.24,4
11	Sabine Sommer	Austria	5:11.43,1	+22.49,0
12	Ashleigh Moolman	South Africa	5:13.48,1	+24.54,0
13	Claudia Peretti	Italy	5:13.53,8	+24.59,7
14	Jana Czeczinkarová	Czech Republic	5:17.23,4	+28.29,4
15	Lejla Tanović	Bosnia and Herzegovina	5:17.26,6	+28.32,5
16	Kataržina Sosna	Lithuania	5:18.14,6	+29.20,5
17	Daniela Campuzano	Mexico	5:19.00,1	+30.06,0
18	Janina Wüst	Switzerland	5:19.13,4	+30.19,3
19	Sandra Mairhofer	Italy	5:22.36,7	+33.42,6
20	Hildegunn Hovdenak	Norway	5:26.44,3	+37.50,2
21	Mónica Calderón	Colombia	5:29.18,5	+40.24,4
22	Debora Piana	Italy	5:29.47,6	+40.53,5
23	Margot Moschetti	France	5:31.48,6	+42.54,5
24	Barbara Benkó	Hungary	5:34.06,6	+45.12,5
25	Greete Steinburg	Estonia	5:35.53,3	+46.59,2
26	Sabrina Enaux	France	5:36.45,6	+47.51,5
27	Antonia Bunter	Switzerland	5:38.23,8	+49.29,7
28	Stefanie Dohrn	Germany	5:40.10,7	+51.16,6
29	Janelle Uibokand	Estonia	5:46.44,7	+57.50,6
30	Manuela Mureșan	Romania	5:48.10,1	+59.16,0
31	Veronika Weiß	Germany	5:48.40,6	+59.46,5
32	Janine Schneider	Germany	5:53.04,6	+1:04.10,5
33	Sarah Hill	South Africa	5:53.17,8	+1:04.23,7
34	Nikol Flašarová	Czech Republic	5:58.07,2	+1:09.13,1
35	Kelly Catale	United States	5:59.43,8	+1:10.49,7
36	Alessia Nay	Switzerland	6:11.29,4	+1:22.35,3
37	Theresa Ralph	South Africa	6:20.18,8	+1:31.24,7
38	Tanja Priller	Germany	6:34.30,9	+1:45.36,8
39	Stefanie Zahno	Switzerland	6:35.48,1	+1:46.54,0
40	Sandra Stadelmann	Switzerland	6:36.54,2	+1:48.00,1
	Marie Debant	France	DNF	
	Ramona Forchini	Switzerland	DNF	
	Angelika Tazreiter	Austria	DNF	
	Diana Pinilla	Colombia	DNF	
	Lea Hofer	Switzerland	DNF	
	Ilona Chavaillaz	Switzerland	DNF	
	Jessica Benz	Germany	DNF	
	Rebecca Leaper	Great Britain	DNF	
	Daniela Höfler	Germany	DNF	
	Costanza Fasolis	Italy	DNF	
