= Cycling at the 2006 Commonwealth Games – Women's cross-country =

The women's cross country mountain biking competition at the 2006 Commonwealth Games took place on 23 March at Lysterfield Park.

== Result ==
Rank	Rider	Time
1st place, gold medalist(s)	Marie-Hélène Prémont (CAN)	1:55:04
2nd place, silver medalist(s)	Rosara Joseph (NZL)	1:56:31
3rd place, bronze medalist(s)	Kiara Bisaro (CAN)	1:57:59
4	Amy Hunt (ENG)	2:01:33
5	Dellys Starr (AUS)	2:02:12
6	Robyn Wong (NZL)	2:02:36
7	Emma Colson (AUS)	2:06:07
8	Sonia Foote (NZL)	2:09:32
9	Myra Molley (COK)	2:11:33
10	Ruth McGavigan (SCO)	2:13:47
	Claire Baxter (AUS)	LAP
