= Cycling at the 2008 Summer Olympics – Women's cross-country =

Women's cross-country at the Games of the XXIX Olympiad
- Olympic Mountain biking
- Venue: Laoshan Mountain Bike Course
- Dates: August 23, 2008
- Competitors: 30 from 21 nations
- Winning time: 1:45:11

Medalists
1st place, gold medalist(s)		Sabine Spitz; Germany
2nd place, silver medalist(s)		Maja Włoszczowska; Poland
3rd place, bronze medalist(s)		Irina Kalentieva; Russia

The women's cross-country mountain biking at the 2008 Summer Olympics took place at the Laoshan Mountain Bike Course on August 23, 2008.

Germany's Sabine Spitz opened up a commanding, one-minute lead from the rest of the field and then stayed out in front to a spectacular finish with a gold-medal time in 1:45:11. Trailing behind the leader by more than forty seconds, Poland's Maja Włoszczowska took home the silver in 1:45:52, while Russian rider Irina Kalentieva held off a tight battle with Canada's Catharine Pendrel down the final lap to grab the bronze in 1:46:28. Among the 30 mountain bikers who competed in the cross-country race, only eighteen of them managed to complete the full distance.

== Competition format ==
The competition began at 10:00 am with a mass-start in which riders are positioned according to their current world ranking so that the higher-ranked riders are near the front. The cross-country race also involved six laps, with 172 m of elevation change for each, around the 4.45 km course at Laoshan Mountain Bike Course. The overall distance of the race was 26.70 km.

== Schedule ==
All times are China standard time (UTC+8)

Date	Time	Round
Saturday, 23 August 2008	10:00	Final

== Result ==
Rank	Rider	Country	Time
1st place, gold medalist(s)	Sabine Spitz	Germany	1:45:11
2nd place, silver medalist(s)	Maja Włoszczowska	Poland	1:45:52
3rd place, bronze medalist(s)	Irina Kalentieva	Russia	1:46:28
4	Catharine Pendrel	Canada	1:46:37
5	Ren Chengyuan	China	1:47:40
6	Petra Henzi	Switzerland	1:48:41
7	Mary McConneloug	United States	1:50:34
8	Georgia Gould	United States	1:50:51
9	Rosara Joseph	New Zealand	1:51:07
10	Aleksandra Dawidowicz	Poland	1:51:21
11	Elisabeth Osl	Austria	1:51:39
12	Liu Ying	China	1:52:01
13	Lene Byberg	Norway	1:53:19
14	Elsbeth van Rooy-Vink	Netherlands	1:53:30
15	Nathalie Schneitter	Switzerland	1:53:42
16	Eva Lechner	Italy	1:58:22
17	Laurence Leboucher	France	2:00:55
18	Adelheid Morath	Germany	2:02:25
19	Jaqueline Mourão	Brazil	LAP (1 lap)
20	Rie Katayama	Japan	LAP (1 lap)
21	Blaža Klemenčič	Slovenia	LAP (1 lap)
22	Yolande Speedy	South Africa	LAP (2 laps)
23	Vera Andreeva	Russia	LAP (2 laps)
24	Janka Števková	Slovakia	LAP (2 laps)
25	Dellys Starr	Australia	LAP (2 laps)
26	Francisca Campos	Chile	LAP (2 laps)
	Gunn-Rita Dahle Flesjå	Norway	DNF
	Margarita Fullana	Spain	DNF
	Marie-Hélène Prémont	Canada	DNF
	Tereza Huříková	Czech Republic	DNF
