= Mona Mitterwallner =

Austrian cyclist (born 2002)

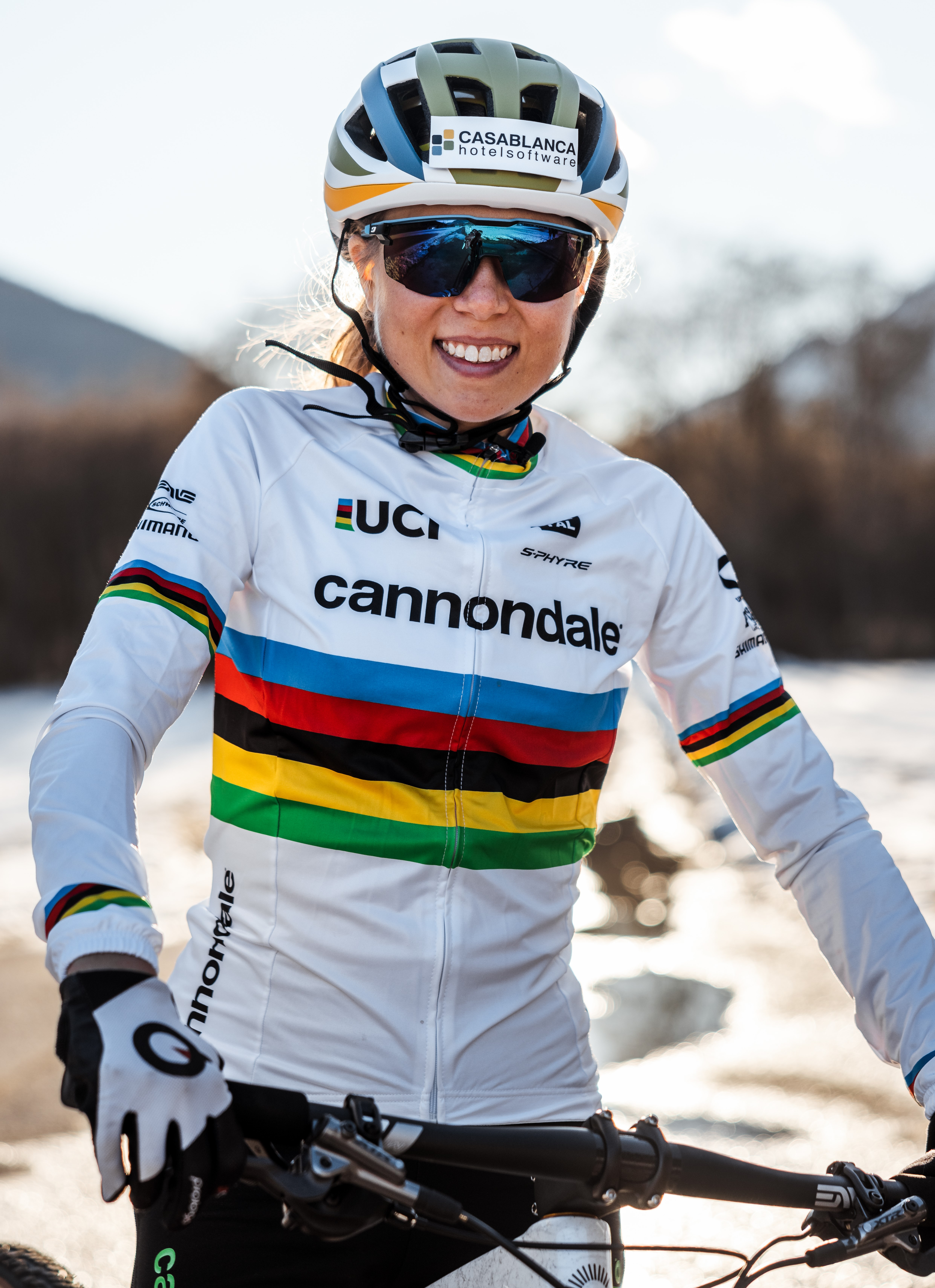
- Mitterwallner in 2022

Personal information
- Born: 9 January 2002 (age 24)
- Height: 1.58 m (5 ft 2 in)

Cycling career
- Sport: Cycling
- Current team: Cannondale Factory Racing
- Discipline: Mountain biking
- Role: Rider

Professional teams
- 2021: Trek–Vaude
- 2022–: Cannondale Factory Racing

Major wins
- Mountain bike World Marathon Championships (2021, 2023, 2024) XC World Cup 3 individual wins (2023, 2025)
Medal record
Representing Austria
Women's mountain bike racing
World Championships
Gold medal – first place	2020 Leogang	Junior Cross-country
Gold medal – first place	2021 Val di Sole	U23 Cross-country
Silver medal – second place	2019 Mont-Sainte-Anne	Junior Cross-country
Bronze medal – third place	2025 Valais	Marathon
European Games
Silver medal – second place	2023 Kraków-Małopolska	Cross-country
European Championships
Gold medal – first place	2020 Monteceneri	Junior Cross-country
Gold medal – first place	2021 Novi Sad	U23 Cross-country
Silver medal – second place	2019 Brno	Junior Cross-country
Silver medal – second place	2023 Krynica-Zdrój	Cross-country
Silver medal – second place	2024 Cheile Grădiștei	Cross-country
Women's cross-country marathon
World Championships
Gold medal – first place	2021 Elba	Women's
Gold medal – first place	2023 Glasgow	Women's
Gold medal – first place	2024 Snowshoe	Women's

Mona Mitterwallner (born 9 January 2002) is an Austrian professional cross-country mountain biker. She won the 2021 and 2023 UCI Mountain Bike Marathon World Championships.

== Major results ==
2018
1st Cross-country, UEC European Junior Championships
2019
1st Cross-country, National Junior Championships
2nd Cross-country, UCI World Junior Championships
2nd Cross-country, UEC European Junior Championships
2020
1st Cross-country, UCI World Junior Championships
1st Cross-country, UEC European Junior Championships
1st Cross-country, National Championships
2021
1st Marathon, UCI World Championships
1st Cross-country, UCI World Under-23 Championships
1st Cross-country, UEC European Under-23 Championships
1st Cross-country, National Championships
1st Overall UCI Under-23 XCO World Cup

1st Albstadt
1st Nové Město
1st Leogang
1st Les Gets
1st Lenzerheide
1st Snowshoe

Swiss Bike Cup

1st Leukerbad

Internazionali d’Italia Series

2nd Andora
3rd Nals

French Cup

3rd Lons-le-Saunier

2022
1st Cross-country, National Championships
Internazionali d’Italia Series

1st Nals

UCI XCO World Cup

2nd Vallnord
2nd Mont-Sainte-Anne
3rd Albstadt

2023
1st Marathon, UCI World Championships
1st Cross-country, National Championships
3rd Overall UCI XCO World Cup

1st Vallnord
1st Les Gets
2nd Leogang
5th Val di Sole

2nd Cross-country, UEC European Championships
Shimano Super Cup Massi

2nd Banyoles

2024
1st Marathon, UCI World Championships
2nd Cross-country, UEC European Championships
2nd Cross-country, National Championships
2nd Overall Cape Epic (with Candice Lill)
2025
UCI XCO World Cup

1st Nové Město

3rd Marathon, UCI World Championships
2026
3rd Marathon, UCI World Championships
