= 2023 UCI Mountain Bike World Cup =

Series of races for all-terrain bicyclists

- Thirty-fourth edition of the UCI Mountain Bike World Cup

Details
- Dates: March–October 2023
- Races: 8 (XCO); 8 (DHI)

Champions
- Male individual champion: (Switzerland) Nino Schurter (XCO) (France) Loïc Bruni (DH)
- Female individual champion: (Netherlands) Puck Pieterse (XCO) (Austria) Valentina Höll (DH)

The 2023 UCI Mountain Bike World Cup is a series of races in Olympic Cross-Country (XCO), Cross-Country Eliminator (XCE), and Downhill (DHI). Each discipline has an Elite Men and an Elite Women category. There are also under-23 categories in the XCO and junior categories in the DHI. The series has eight rounds both cross-country and downhill, some of which are held concurrently. In 2023, enduro was added to the UCI World Cup series.

== Cross-country ==
=== Elite ===
Date	Venue	Podium (Men)	Podium (Women)
14 May	(Czech Republic) Nové Město na Moravě	Tom Pidcock (GBR)	Puck Pieterse (NED)
14 May	(Czech Republic) Nové Město na Moravě	Joshua Dubau (FRA)	Pauline Ferrand-Prévot (FRA)
14 May	(Czech Republic) Nové Město na Moravě	Nino Schurter (SUI)	Loana Lecomte (FRA)
11 June	(Switzerland) Lenzerheide	Nino Schurter (SUI)	Loana Lecomte (FRA)
11 June	(Switzerland) Lenzerheide	Alan Hatherly (RSA)	Anne Terpstra (NED)
11 June	(Switzerland) Lenzerheide	Jordan Sarrou (FRA)	Alessandra Keller (SUI)
18 June	(Austria) Leogang	Lars Forster (SUI)	Puck Pieterse (NED)
18 June	(Austria) Leogang	Luca Schwarzbauer (GER)	Mona Mitterwallner (AUT)
18 June	(Austria) Leogang	Ondřej Cink (CZE)	Laura Stigger (AUT)
2 July	(Italy) Val di Sole	Nino Schurter (SUI)	Puck Pieterse (NED)
2 July	(Italy) Val di Sole	Mathias Flückiger (SUI)	Martina Berta (ITA)
2 July	(Italy) Val di Sole	Vlad Dascălu (ROM)	Rebecca Henderson (AUS)
27 August	(Andorra) Pal–Arinsal	Mathias Flückiger (SUI)	Mona Mitterwallner (AUT)
27 August	(Andorra) Pal–Arinsal	Thomas Griot (FRA)	Alessandra Keller (SUI)
27 August	(Andorra) Pal–Arinsal	Tom Pidcock (GBR)	Pauline Ferrand-Prévot (FRA)
10 September	(France) Les Gets	Victor Koretzky (FRA)	Mona Mitterwallner (AUT)
10 September	(France) Les Gets	Nino Schurter (SUI)	Puck Pieterse (NED)
10 September	(France) Les Gets	Vlad Dascălu (ROM)	Pauline Ferrand-Prévot (FRA)
1 October	(United States) Snowshoe	Jordan Sarrou (FRA)	Laura Stigger (AUT)
1 October	(United States) Snowshoe	Nino Schurter (SUI)	Loana Lecomte (FRA)
1 October	(United States) Snowshoe	Marcel Guerrini (SUI)	Martina Berta (ITA)
8 October	(Canada) Mont-Sainte-Anne	Tom Pidcock (GBR)	Loana Lecomte (FRA)
8 October	(Canada) Mont-Sainte-Anne	Mathias Flückiger (SUI)	Jenny Rissveds (SWE)
8 October	(Canada) Mont-Sainte-Anne	Marcel Guerrini (SUI)	Puck Pieterse (NED)

=== Under 23 ===
Date	Venue	Podium (Men)	Podium (Women)
13 May	(Czech Republic) Nové Město na Moravě	Oliver Vedersø Sølvhøj (DEN)	Sofie Heby Pedersen (DEN)
13 May	(Czech Republic) Nové Město na Moravě	Dario Lillo (SUI)	Ginia Caluori (SUI)
13 May	(Czech Republic) Nové Město na Moravě	Tom Schellekens (NED)	Emilly Johnston (CAN)
11 June	(Switzerland) Lenzerheide	Dario Lillo (SUI)	Sofie Heby Pedersen (DEN)
11 June	(Switzerland) Lenzerheide	Carter Woods (CAN)	Ronja Blöchlinger (SUI)
11 June	(Switzerland) Lenzerheide	Adrien Boichis (FRA)	Sara Cortinovis (ITA)
18 June	(Austria) Leogang	Adrien Boichis (FRA)	Sofie Heby Pedersen (DEN)
18 June	(Austria) Leogang	Dario Lillo (SUI)	Sammie Maxwell (NZL)
18 June	(Austria) Leogang	Luke Wiedmann (SUI)	Ginia Caluori (SUI)
2 July	(Italy) Val di Sole	Carter Woods (CAN)	Sofie Heby Pedersen (DEN)
2 July	(Italy) Val di Sole	Adrien Boichis (FRA)	Sammie Maxwell (NZL)
2 July	(Italy) Val di Sole	Riley Amos (USA)	Ronja Blöchlinger (SUI)
27 August	(Andorra) Pal–Arinsal	Riley Amos (USA)	Noëlle Buri (SUI)
27 August	(Andorra) Pal–Arinsal	Adrien Boichis (FRA)	Ronja Blöchlinger (SUI)
27 August	(Andorra) Pal–Arinsal	Luca Martin (FRA)	Noémie Garnier (FRA)
10 September	(France) Les Gets	Adrien Boichis (FRA)	Sammie Maxwell (NZL)
10 September	(France) Les Gets	Riley Amos (USA)	Ronja Blöchlinger (SUI)
10 September	(France) Les Gets	Carter Woods (CAN)	Ginia Caluori (SUI)
1 October	(United States) Snowshoe	Carter Woods (CAN)	Sammie Maxwell (NZL)
1 October	(United States) Snowshoe	Adrien Boichis (FRA)	Ronja Blöchlinger (SUI)
1 October	(United States) Snowshoe	Riley Amos (USA)	Ginia Caluori (SUI)
8 October	(Canada) Mont-Sainte-Anne	Riley Amos (USA)	Ronja Blöchlinger (SUI)
8 October	(Canada) Mont-Sainte-Anne	Adrien Boichis (FRA)	Noëlle Buri (SUI)
8 October	(Canada) Mont-Sainte-Anne	Bjorn Riley (USA)	Madigan Munro (USA)

== Cross-country short track ==
=== Elite ===
Date	Venue	Podium (Men)	Podium (Women)
11 May	(Czech Republic) Nové Město na Moravě	Tom Pidcock (GBR)	Laura Stigger (AUT)
11 May	(Czech Republic) Nové Město na Moravě	Luca Schwarzbauer (GER)	Alessandra Keller (SUI)
11 May	(Czech Republic) Nové Město na Moravě	Nino Schurter (SUI)	Sina Frei (SUI)
9 June	(Switzerland) Lenzerheide	Luca Schwarzbauer (GER)	Jenny Rissveds (SWE)
9 June	(Switzerland) Lenzerheide	Jordan Sarrou (FRA)	Alessandra Keller (SUI)
9 June	(Switzerland) Lenzerheide	Sebastian Fini Carstensen (DEN)	Pauline Ferrand-Prévot (FRA)
16 June	(Austria) Leogang	Jordan Sarrou (FRA)	Pauline Ferrand-Prévot (FRA)
16 June	(Austria) Leogang	Luca Schwarzbauer (GER)	Puck Pieterse (NED)
16 June	(Austria) Leogang	Jens Schuermans (BEL)	Evie Richards (GBR)
30 June	(Italy) Val di Sole	Luca Schwarzbauer (GER)	Laura Stigger (AUT)
30 June	(Italy) Val di Sole	Alan Hatherly (RSA)	Puck Pieterse (NED)
30 June	(Italy) Val di Sole	Joshua Dubau (FRA)	Pauline Ferrand-Prévot (FRA)
25 August	(Andorra) Pal–Arinsal	Luca Schwarzbauer (GER)	Alessandra Keller (SUI)
25 August	(Andorra) Pal–Arinsal	Nino Schurter (SUI)	Evie Richards (GBR)
25 August	(Andorra) Pal–Arinsal	Jordan Sarrou (FRA)	Puck Pieterse (NED)
8 September	(France) Les Gets	Victor Koretzky (FRA)	Puck Pieterse (NED)
8 September	(France) Les Gets	Jordan Sarrou (FRA)	Evie Richards (GBR)
8 September	(France) Les Gets	Luca Schwarzbauer (GER)	Alessandra Keller (SUI)
29 September	(United States) Snowshoe	Victor Koretzky (FRA)	Evie Richards (GBR)
29 September	(United States) Snowshoe	Jordan Sarrou (FRA)	Puck Pieterse (NED)
29 September	(United States) Snowshoe	Luca Schwarzbauer (GER)	Rebecca Henderson (AUS)
6 October	(Canada) Mont-Sainte-Anne	Victor Koretzky (FRA)	Laura Stigger (AUT)
6 October	(Canada) Mont-Sainte-Anne	Jordan Sarrou (FRA)	Loana Lecomte (FRA)
6 October	(Canada) Mont-Sainte-Anne	Christopher Blevins (USA)	Rebecca Henderson (AUS)

== Downhill ==
=== Elite ===
Date	Venue	Podium (Men)	Podium (Women)
10 June	(Switzerland) Lenzerheide	Jordan Williams (GBR)	Rachel Atherton (GBR)
10 June	(Switzerland) Lenzerheide	Loris Vergier (FRA)	Camille Balanche (SUI)
10 June	(Switzerland) Lenzerheide	Loïc Bruni (FRA)	Nina Hoffmann (GER)
17 June	(Austria) Leogang	Andreas Kolb (AUT)	Valentina Höll (AUT)
17 June	(Austria) Leogang	Loïc Bruni (FRA)	Camille Balanche (SUI)
17 June	(Austria) Leogang	Jackson Goldstone (CAN)	Rachel Atherton (GBR)
1 July	(Italy) Val di Sole	Jackson Goldstone (CAN)	Valentina Höll (AUT)
1 July	(Italy) Val di Sole	Finn Iles (CAN)	Camille Balanche (SUI)
1 July	(Italy) Val di Sole	Thibaut Dapréla (FRA)	Jess Blewitt (NZL)
26 August	(Andorra) Pal–Arinsal	Thibaut Dapréla (FRA)	Nina Hoffmann (GER)
26 August	(Andorra) Pal–Arinsal	Greg Minnaar (RSA)	Valentina Höll (AUT)
26 August	(Andorra) Pal–Arinsal	Finn Iles (CAN)	Tahnée Seagrave (GBR)
3 September	(France) Loudenvielle–Peyragudes	Loïc Bruni (FRA)	Valentina Höll (AUT)
3 September	(France) Loudenvielle–Peyragudes	Dakotah Norton (USA)	Nina Hoffmann (GER)
3 September	(France) Loudenvielle–Peyragudes	Laurie Greenland (GBR)	Marine Cabirou (FRA)
9 September	(France) Les Gets	Benoît Coulanges (FRA)	Marine Cabirou (FRA)
9 September	(France) Les Gets	Andreas Kolb (AUT)	Monika Hrastnik (SLO)
9 September	(France) Les Gets	Loris Vergier (FRA)	Nina Hoffmann (GER)
30 September	(United States) Snowshoe	Oisin O'Callaghan (IRE)	Marine Cabirou (FRA)
30 September	(United States) Snowshoe	Ronan Dunne (IRE)	Nina Hoffmann (GER)
30 September	(United States) Snowshoe	Dakotah Norton (USA)	Valentina Höll (AUT)
7 October	(Canada) Mont-Sainte-Anne	Jackson Goldstone (CAN)	Valentina Höll (AUT)
7 October	(Canada) Mont-Sainte-Anne	Ethan Craik (GBR)	Nina Hoffmann (GER)
7 October	(Canada) Mont-Sainte-Anne	Loïc Bruni (FRA)	Veronika Widmann (ITA)

=== Junior ===
The event in Loudenvielle–Peyragudes was affected by significant rainfall. The junior downhill finals were cancelled and the qualifying results were used to determine the final results.

Date	Venue	Podium (Men)	Podium (Women)
9 June	(Switzerland) Lenzerheide	Christian Hauser (ITA)	Erice van Leuven (NZL)
9 June	(Switzerland) Lenzerheide	Bodhi Kuhn (CAN)	Valentina Roa (COL)
9 June	(Switzerland) Lenzerheide	Hugo Marini (FRA)	Lisa Bouladou (FRA)
16 June	(Austria) Leogang	Léo Abella (FRA)	Lisa Bouladou (FRA)
16 June	(Austria) Leogang	Bodhi Kuhn (CAN)	Aimi Kenyon (GBR)
16 June	(Austria) Leogang	Daniel Castellanos (ESP)	Riley Miller (USA)
30 June	(Italy) Val di Sole	Bodhi Kuhn (CAN)	Sacha Earnest (NZL)
30 June	(Italy) Val di Sole	Ryan Pinkerton (USA)	Erice van Leuven (NZL)
30 June	(Italy) Val di Sole	Henri Kiefer (GER)	Lisa Bouladou (FRA)
25 August	(Andorra) Pal–Arinsal	Ryan Pinkerton (USA)	Erice van Leuven (NZL)
25 August	(Andorra) Pal–Arinsal	Christian Hauser (ITA)	Valentina Roa (COL)
25 August	(Andorra) Pal–Arinsal	Nathan Pontvianne (FRA)	Lisa Bouladou (FRA)
1 September	(France) Loudenvielle–Peyragudes	Ryan Pinkerton (USA)	Sacha Earnest (NZL)
1 September	(France) Loudenvielle–Peyragudes	Nathan Pontvianne (FRA)	Erice van Leuven (NZL)
1 September	(France) Loudenvielle–Peyragudes	Christian Hauser (ITA)	Valentina Roa (COL)
8 September	(France) Les Gets	Ryan Pinkerton (USA)	Valentina Roa (COL)
8 September	(France) Les Gets	Jon Mozell (CAN)	Sacha Mills (AUS)
8 September	(France) Les Gets	Evan Medcalf (USA)	Laïs Bonnaure (FRA)
29 September	(United States) Snowshoe	Ryan Pinkerton (USA)	Erice van Leuven (NZL)
29 September	(United States) Snowshoe	Evan Medcalf (USA)	Taylor Ostgaard (USA)
29 September	(United States) Snowshoe	Mylann Falquet (FRA)	Valentina Roa (COL)
6 October	(Canada) Mont-Sainte-Anne	Nathan Pontvianne (FRA)	Valentina Roa (COL)
6 October	(Canada) Mont-Sainte-Anne	Mylann Falquet (FRA)	Sacha Earnest (NZL)
6 October	(Canada) Mont-Sainte-Anne	Kimi Viardot (FRA)	Lisa Bouladou (FRA)

== Cross-country eliminator ==
Date	Venue	Podium (Men)	Podium (Women)
21 May	(Turkey) Adapazarı–Sakarya	Titouan Perrin-Ganier (FRA)	Marion Fromberger (GER)
21 May	(Turkey) Adapazarı–Sakarya	Simon Gegenheimer (GER)	Annemoon van Dienst (NED)
21 May	(Turkey) Adapazarı–Sakarya	Quentin Schrotzenberger (FRA)	Didi de Vries (NED)
4 June	(Belgium) Leuven	Titouan Perrin-Ganier (FRA)	Gaia Tormena (ITA)
4 June	(Belgium) Leuven	Jarne Vandersteen (BEL)	Shanyl de Schoesitter (BEL)
4 June	(Belgium) Leuven	Simon Gegenheimer (GER)	Line Mygdam (DEN)
15 July	(Germany) Aalen	Felix Klausmann (GER)	Lia Schrievers (GER)
15 July	(Germany) Aalen	Titouan Perrin-Ganier (FRA)	Gaia Tormena (ITA)
15 July	(Germany) Aalen	Killian Demangeon (FRA)	Lina Huber (GER)
13 August	(Belgium) Oudenaarde	Sondre Rokke (NOR)	Gaia Tormena (ITA)
13 August	(Belgium) Oudenaarde	Lorenzo Serres (FRA)	Marion Fromberger (GER)
13 August	(Belgium) Oudenaarde	Quentin Schrotzenberger (FRA)	Agnes Abrahamsson (SWE)
29 September	(Spain) Barcelona	Simon Gegenheimer (GER)	Gaia Tormena (ITA)
29 September	(Spain) Barcelona	Lorenzo Serres (FRA)	Marion Fromberger (GER)
29 September	(Spain) Barcelona	Theo Hauser (AUT)	Katharina Sadnik (AUT)

== E-MTB cross-country ==
On 31 August 2023, the Union Cycliste Internationale announced the cancellation of the event in Charade–Clermont-Ferrand that had been scheduled for 30 September and 1 October 2023.

Date	Venue	Podium (Men)	Podium (Women)
20 May	Monaco–Breil-sur-Roya	Jérôme Gilloux (FRA)	Nicole Göldi (SUI)
20 May	Monaco–Breil-sur-Roya	Joris Ryf (SUI)	Justine Tonso (FRA)
20 May	Monaco–Breil-sur-Roya	Hugo Pigeon (FRA)	Sofia Wiedenroth (GER)
21 May	Monaco–Breil-sur-Roya	Emeric Ienzer (SUI)	Justine Tonso (FRA)
21 May	Monaco–Breil-sur-Roya	Hugo Pigeon (FRA)	Nicole Göldi (SUI)
21 May	Monaco–Breil-sur-Roya	Jérôme Gilloux (FRA)	Anna Spielmann (AUT)
10 June	(Italy) Bologna	Jérôme Gilloux (FRA)	Nathalie Schneitter (SUI)
10 June	(Italy) Bologna	Robert Williams (GBR)	Justine Tonso (FRA)
10 June	(Italy) Bologna	Martino Fruet (ITA)	Sofia Wiedenroth (GER)
11 June	(Italy) Bologna	Théo Charmes (FRA)	Nicole Göldi (SUI)
11 June	(Italy) Bologna	Jérôme Gilloux (FRA)	Nathalie Schneitter (SUI)
11 June	(Italy) Bologna	Joris Ryf (SUI)	Anna Spielmann (AUT)
15 July	(Italy) Bergamo–Lombardy	Jérôme Gilloux (FRA)	Sofia Wiedenroth (GER)
15 July	(Italy) Bergamo–Lombardy	Joris Ryf (SUI)	Nathalie Schneitter (SUI)
15 July	(Italy) Bergamo–Lombardy	Heiko Hog (GER)	Justine Tonso (FRA)
16 July	(Italy) Bergamo–Lombardy	Joris Ryf (SUI)	Justine Tonso (FRA)
16 July	(Italy) Bergamo–Lombardy	Jérôme Gilloux (FRA)	Nathalie Schneitter (SUI)
16 July	(Italy) Bergamo–Lombardy	Théo Charmes (FRA)	Sofia Wiedenroth (GER)
29 August	(Belgium) Spa-Francorchamps	Joris Ryf (SUI)	Justine Tonso (FRA)
29 August	(Belgium) Spa-Francorchamps	Mirko Tabacchi (ITA)	Sofia Wiedenroth (GER)
29 August	(Belgium) Spa-Francorchamps	Jérôme Gilloux (FRA)	Antonia Daubermann (GER)
30 August	(Belgium) Spa-Francorchamps	Joris Ryf (SUI)	Sofia Wiedenroth (GER)
30 August	(Belgium) Spa-Francorchamps	Jérôme Gilloux (FRA)	Justine Tonso (FRA)
30 August	(Belgium) Spa-Francorchamps	Mirko Tabacchi (ITA)	Antonia Daubermann (GER)
2 September	(Germany) Bielstein	Jérôme Gilloux (FRA)	Justine Tonso (FRA)
2 September	(Germany) Bielstein	Joris Ryf (SUI)	Sofia Wiedenroth (GER)
2 September	(Germany) Bielstein	Théo Charmes (FRA)	Antonia Daubermann (GER)
3 September	(Germany) Bielstein	Jérôme Gilloux (FRA)	Justine Tonso (FRA)
3 September	(Germany) Bielstein	Joris Ryf (SUI)	Sofia Wiedenroth (GER)
3 September	(Germany) Bielstein	Mirko Tabacchi (ITA)	Antonia Daubermann (GER)
22 September	(Spain) Costa Brava–Girona	Jérôme Gilloux (FRA)	Sofia Wiedenroth (GER)
22 September	(Spain) Costa Brava–Girona	Joris Ryf (SUI)	Justine Tonso (FRA)
22 September	(Spain) Costa Brava–Girona	Mirko Tabacchi (ITA)	Barbora Vojta (CZE)
23 September	(Spain) Costa Brava–Girona	Jérôme Gilloux (FRA)	Justine Tonso (FRA)
23 September	(Spain) Costa Brava–Girona	Joris Ryf (SUI)	Anna Spielmann (AUT)
23 September	(Spain) Costa Brava–Girona	Lluc Coma (ESP)	Barbora Vojta (CZE)
21 October	(Spain) Barcelona	Jérôme Gilloux (FRA)	Anna Spielmann (AUT)
21 October	(Spain) Barcelona	Mirko Tabacchi (ITA)	Nathalie Schneitter (SUI)
21 October	(Spain) Barcelona	Guillem Cassú (ESP)	Sofia Wiedenroth (GER)

== Enduro ==
In enduro races, the downhills are timed and the uphills are mandatory but not timed.

=== Elite ===
Date	Venue	Podium (Men)	Podium (Women)
26 March	(Australia) Maydena	Luke Meier-Smith (AUS)	Isabeau Courdurier (FRA)
26 March	(Australia) Maydena	Daniel Booker (AUS)	Morgane Charre (FRA)
26 March	(Australia) Maydena	Connor Fearon (AUS)	Ella Conolly (GBR)
1 April	(Australia) Derby	Richard Rude Jr. (USA)	Rebecca Baraona (GBR)
1 April	(Australia) Derby	Sławomir Łukasik (POL)	Harriet Harnden (GBR)
1 April	(Australia) Derby	Jesse Melamed (CAN)	Ella Conolly (GBR)
3 June	(Italy) Finale Ligure	Jesse Melamed (CAN)	Morgane Charre (FRA)
3 June	(Italy) Finale Ligure	Rhys Verner (CAN)	Gloria Scarsi (ITA)
3 June	(Italy) Finale Ligure	Alex Rudeau (FRA)	Isabeau Courdurier (FRA)
15 June	(Austria) Leogang	Rhys Verner (CAN)	Isabeau Courdurier (FRA)
15 June	(Austria) Leogang	Richard Rude Jr. (USA)	Gloria Scarsi (ITA)
15 June	(Austria) Leogang	Alex Rudeau (FRA)	Morgane Charre (FRA)
25 June	(Italy) Val di Fassa Trentino	Matthew Walker (NZL)	Isabeau Courdurier (FRA)
25 June	(Italy) Val di Fassa Trentino	Alex Rudeau (FRA)	Morgane Charre (FRA)
25 June	(Italy) Val di Fassa Trentino	Richard Rude Jr. (USA)	Mélanie Pugin (FRA)
1 September	(France) Loudenvielle–Peyragudes	Youn Deniaud (FRA)	Isabeau Courdurier (FRA)
1 September	(France) Loudenvielle–Peyragudes	Alex Rudeau (FRA)	Morgane Charre (FRA)
1 September	(France) Loudenvielle–Peyragudes	Louis Jeandel (FRA)	Ella Conolly (GBR)
17 September	(France) Châtel	Jesse Melamed (CAN)	Morgane Charre (FRA)
17 September	(France) Châtel	Alex Rudeau (FRA)	Isabeau Courdurier (FRA)
17 September	(France) Châtel	Richard Rude Jr. (USA)	Harriet Harnden (GBR)

=== Under 21 ===
Date	Venue	Podium (Men)	Podium (Women)
26 March	(Australia) Maydena	Sascha Kim (AUS)	Emmy Lan (CAN)
26 March	(Australia) Maydena	Remy Meier-Smith (AUS)	Erice van Leuven (NZL)
26 March	(Australia) Maydena	Will Hynes (AUS)	Elly Hoskin (CAN)
1 April	(Australia) Derby	Sascha Kim (AUS)	Erice van Leuven (NZL)
1 April	(Australia) Derby	Cooper Lowe (AUS)	Elly Hoskin (CAN)
1 April	(Australia) Derby	Lisandru Bertini (FRA)	Lia Ladbrook (AUS)
3 June	(Italy) Finale Ligure	Luca Boscheri (ITA)	Clarissa Carzolio (ITA)
3 June	(Italy) Finale Ligure	Daniel Cavosi (ITA)	Emilie Polo (ITA)
3 June	(Italy) Finale Ligure	Bruno Jiménez (ESP)	Delia Da Mocogno (SUI)
15 June	(Austria) Leogang	Lisandru Bertini (FRA)	Emmy Lan (CAN)
15 June	(Austria) Leogang	Sascha Kim (AUS)	Lily Planquart (FRA)
15 June	(Austria) Leogang	Johnathan Helly (CAN)	Lily Boucher (CAN)
25 June	(Italy) Val di Fassa Trentino	Lisandru Bertini (FRA)	Emmy Lan (CAN)
25 June	(Italy) Val di Fassa Trentino	Alexis Icardo (FRA)	Sophie Riva (ITA)
25 June	(Italy) Val di Fassa Trentino	Johnathan Helly (CAN)	Elly Hoskin (CAN)
1 September	(France) Loudenvielle–Peyragudes	Lisandru Bertini (FRA)	Emmy Lan (CAN)
1 September	(France) Loudenvielle–Peyragudes	Raphaël Giambi (FRA)	Emily Carrick-Anderson (GBR)
1 September	(France) Loudenvielle–Peyragudes	Sascha Kim (AUS)	Lily Planquart (FRA)
17 September	(France) Portes du Soleil	Gold medal	Gold medal
17 September	(France) Portes du Soleil	Silver medal	Silver medal
17 September	(France) Portes du Soleil	Bronze medal	Bronze medal

== Marathon ==
Date	Venue	Podium (Men)	Podium (Women)
13 May	(Czech Republic) Nové Město na Moravě	Fabian Rabensteiner (ITA)	Lejla Njemčević (BIH)
13 May	(Czech Republic) Nové Město na Moravě	Nicolas Samparisi (ITA)	Kataržina Sosna (LIT)
13 May	(Czech Republic) Nové Město na Moravě	Simon Stiebjahn (GER)	Irina Luetzelschwab (SUI)
4 June	(Italy) Finale Ligure	Diego Arias (COL)	Adelheid Morath (GER)
4 June	(Italy) Finale Ligure	Martin Stošek (CZE)	Lejla Njemčević (BIH)
4 June	(Italy) Finale Ligure	Fabian Rabensteiner (ITA)	Vera Looser (NAM)
16 September	(France) Morzine-Avoriaz	Héctor Leonardo Páez (COL)	Vera Looser (NAM)
16 September	(France) Morzine-Avoriaz	Diego Rosa (ITA)	Lejla Njemčević (BIH)
16 September	(France) Morzine-Avoriaz	Andreas Seewald (GER)	Irina Luetzelschwab (SUI)
27 September	(United States) Snowshoe	Simon Stiebjahn (GER)	Hannah Otto (USA)
27 September	(United States) Snowshoe	Axel Roudil-Cortinat (FRA)	Haley Smith (CAN)
27 September	(United States) Snowshoe	Casey South (SUI)	Kataržina Sosna (LTU)

== World Cup standings ==
bold denotes race winners.

=== Cross-country ===
==== Men's ====
**Top 5 men's elite standings**
Rank	Rider	CZE (Czech Republic)	SUI (Switzerland)	AUT (Austria)	ITA (Italy)	AND (Andorra)	FRA (France)	USA (United States)	CAN (Canada)	Total Points
1	(Switzerland) **Nino Schurter**	198	**277**	90	**283**	150	200	235	116	**1549**
2	(France) Jordan Sarrou	185	225	170	146	200	103	**315**	165	**1509**
3	(Switzerland) Mathias Flückiger	160	127	159	235	**288**	131	166	233	**1499**
4	(Germany) Luca Schwarzbauer	180	103	265	170	220	135	140	131	**1344**
5	(France) Thomas Griot	167	169	153	72	229	150	146	110	**1196**

**Top 5 men's under 23 standings**
Rank	Rider	CZE (Czech Republic)	SUI (Switzerland)	AUT (Austria)	ITA (Italy)	AND (Andorra)	FRA (France)	USA (United States)	CAN (Canada)	Total Points
1	(France) **Adrien Boichis**	86	110	**165**	125	140	**165**	113	140	**1044**
2	(United States) Riley Amos	59	41	64	100	**155**	130	120	**150**	**819**
3	(Canada) Carter Woods	66	125	69	**165**	59	105	**155**	30	**774**
4	(Switzerland) Dario Lillo	119	**165**	118	68	93	67	70	63	**763**
5	(Switzerland) Luke Wiedmann	62	79	105	82	75	90	39	61	**593**

==== Women's ====
**Top 5 women's elite standings**
Rank	Rider	CZE (Czech Republic)	SUI (Switzerland)	AUT (Austria)	ITA (Italy)	AND (Andorra)	FRA (France)	USA (United States)	CAN (Canada)	Total Points
1	(Netherlands) **Puck Pieterse**	**286**	180	**315**	**315**	170	280	195	198	**1939**
2	(France) Loana Lecomte	185	**272**	173	DNS	185	158	238	**315**	**1526**
3	(Austria) Mona Mitterwallner	100	147	236	171	**284**	**287**	127	93	**1445**
4	(Austria) Laura Stigger	150	122	188	230	88	123	**283**	210	**1394**
5	(Switzerland) Alessandra Keller	205	225	102	130	280	130	116	139	**1327**

**Top 5 women's under 23 standings**
Rank	Rider	CZE (Czech Republic)	SUI (Switzerland)	AUT (Austria)	ITA (Italy)	AND (Andorra)	FRA (France)	USA (United States)	CAN (Canada)	Total Points
1	(Switzerland) **Ronja Blöchlinger**	83	140	105	120	140	140	140	**165**	**1033**
2	(Denmark) Sofie Heby Pedersen	**150**	**150**	**155**	**155**	75	95	47	69	**896**
3	(New Zealand) Sammie Maxwell	65	82	111	120	105	**155**	**155**	100	**893**
4	(Switzerland) Noëlle Buri	100	69	100	77	**150**	80	100	125	**801**
5	(Switzerland) Ginia Caluori	113	105	98	71	70	98	97	80	**732**

=== Cross-country short track ===
**Top 5 men's elite standings**
Rank	Rider	CZE (Czech Republic)	SUI (Switzerland)	AUT (Austria)	ITA (Italy)	AND (Andorra)	FRA (France)	USA (United States)	CAN (Canada)	Total Points
1	(Germany) **Luca Schwarzbauer**	160	**250**	200	**250**	**250**	160	160	120	**1550**
2	(France) Jordan Sarrou	110	200	**250**	120	160	200	200	200	**1440**
3	(France) Joshua Dubau	58	140	130	160	120	130	130	58	**926**
4	(Belgium) Jens Schuermans	100	85	150	140	50	150	62	100	**837**
5	(Switzerland) Nino Schurter	140	74	72	95	200	0	110	140	**831**

**Top 5 women's elite standings**
Rank	Rider	CZE (Czech Republic)	SUI (Switzerland)	AUT (Austria)	ITA (Italy)	AND (Andorra)	FRA (France)	USA (United States)	CAN (Canada)	Total Points
1	(Netherlands) **Puck Pieterse**	120	150	200	200	160	**250**	200	140	**1420**
2	(Switzerland) Alessandra Keller	200	200	90	150	**250**	160	150	78	**1278**
3	(United Kingdom) Evie Richards	140	80	160	56	200	200	**250**	150	**1236**
4	(Austria) Laura Stigger	**250**	130	76	**250**	52	76	95	**250**	**1179**
5	(Sweden) Jenny Rissveds	62	**250**	140	140	80	85	110	95	**962**

=== Downhill ===
==== Men's ====
**Top 5 men's elite standings**
Rank	Rider	SUI (Switzerland)	AUT (Austria)	ITA (Italy)	AND (Andorra)	FRA (France)	FRA (France)	USA (United States)	CAN (Canada)	Total Points
1	(France) **Loïc Bruni**	305	290	77	96	**355**	207	188	180	**1698**
2	(Canada) Jackson Goldstone	196	245	**345**	30	220	237	93	**250**	**1616**
3	(France) Loris Vergier	320	166	256	40	126	300	250	75	**1533**
4	(Canada) Finn Iles	216	278	280	195	72	140	139	46	**1366**
5	(Austria) Andreas Kolb	160	**316**	203	17	129	268	169	95	**1357**

**Top 5 men's junior standings**
Rank	Rider	SUI (Switzerland)	AUT (Austria)	ITA (Italy)	AND (Andorra)	FRA (France)	FRA (France)	USA (United States)	CAN (Canada)	Total Points
1	(United States) **Ryan Pinkerton**	35	18	50	**60**	**60**	**60**	**60**	DNS	**343**
2	(France) Nathan Pontvianne	14	4	DNS	45	50	22	30	**60**	**225**
3	(Canada) Bodhi Kuhn	50	50	**60**	35	0	DNS	18	DNS	**213**
4	(France) Mylann Falquet	DNS	7	22	26	26	24	45	50	**200**
5	(France) Léo Abella	DNS	**60**	35	24	30	40	3	5	**197**

==== Women's ====
**Top 5 women's elite standings**
Rank	Rider	SUI (Switzerland)	AUT (Austria)	ITA (Italy)	AND (Andorra)	FRA (France)	FRA (France)	USA (United States)	CAN (Canada)	Total Points
1	(Austria) **Valentina Höll**	192	**400**	**390**	260	**400**	200	330	**250**	**2422**
2	(Germany) Nina Hoffmann	250	180	148	**290**	330	220	285	210	**1913**
3	(France) Marine Cabirou	176	142	225	170	245	**370**	**346**	60	**1734**
4	(Slovenia) Monika Hrastnik	145	235	140	25	166	310	105	150	**1276**
5	(Switzerland) Camille Balanche	360	320	340	0	DNS	DNS	DNS	DNS	**1020**

**Top 5 women's junior standings**
Rank	Rider	SUI (Switzerland)	AUT (Austria)	ITA (Italy)	AND (Andorra)	FRA (France)	FRA (France)	USA (United States)	CAN (Canada)	Total Points
1	(Colombia) **Valentina Roa**	50	40	40	50	45	**60**	45	**60**	**390**
2	(France) Lisa Bouladou	45	**60**	45	45	40	40	40	45	**360**
3	(New Zealand) Erice van Leuven	**60**	0	50	**60**	50	DNS	**60**	5	**285**
4	(New Zealand) Sacha Earnest	DNS	DNS	**60**	DNS	**60**	35	15	50	**220**
5	(France) Laïs Bonnaure	15	DNS	35	30	35	45	30	25	**215**

=== Cross-country eliminator ===
Only the four best results are taken into account for the final ranking

**Top 5 men's elite standings**
Rank	Rider	TUR (Turkey)	BEL (Belgium)	GER (Germany)	BEL (Belgium)	ESP (Spain)	Total Points
1	(France) **Titouan Perrin-Ganier**	**68**	**67**	45	~~8~~	38	**218**
2	(Germany) Simon Gegenheimer	52	40	45	~~24~~	**70**	**207**
3	(France) Lorenzo Serres	~~0~~	31	19	70	**70**	**190**
4	(France) Thibaut Kahlhoven	30	42	29	45	~~0~~	**146**
5	(France) Quentin Schrotzenberger	45	30	26	41	~~16~~	**142**

**Top 5 women's elite standings**
Rank	Rider	TUR (Turkey)	BEL (Belgium)	GER (Germany)	BEL (Belgium)	ESP (Spain)	Total Points
1	(Italy) **Gaia Tormena**	~~55~~	**80**	70	**73**	**90**	**313**
2	(Germany) Marion Fromberger	**80**	~~31~~	45	70	60	**255**
3	(Netherlands) Annemoon van Dienst	55	37	33	19	~~18~~	**144**
4	(Netherlands) Didi de Vries	43	31	~~0~~	23	33	**130**
5	(Sweden) Agnes Abrahamsson	~~0~~	28	25	50	6	**109**

=== E-MTB cross-country ===
Top 5 men's standings
Rank	Rider	MON (Monaco)	MON (Monaco)	ITA (Italy)	ITA (Italy)	ITA (Italy)	ITA (Italy)	BEL (Belgium)	BEL (Belgium)	GER (Germany)	GER (Germany)	ESP (Spain)	ESP (Spain)	ESP (Spain)	Total Points
1	(France) **Jérôme Gilloux**	**25**	16	**25**	20	**25**	20	16	20	**25**	**25**	**25**	**25**	**25**	**292**
2	(Switzerland) Joris Ryf	20	11	13	16	20	**25**	**25**	**25**	20	20	20	20	DNS	**235**
3	(France) Théo Charmes	13	0	11	**25**	7	16	8	11	16	13	DNS	DNS	7	**127**
4	(Germany) Rico Libesch	5	7	9	8	13	6	11	10	11	11	13	4	DNS	**108**
5	(Germany) Heiko Hog	8	9	8	5	16	7	9	8	0	8	6	11	9	**104**

Top 5 women's standings
Rank	Rider	MON (Monaco)	MON (Monaco)	ITA (Italy)	ITA (Italy)	ITA (Italy)	ITA (Italy)	BEL (Belgium)	BEL (Belgium)	GER (Germany)	GER (Germany)	ESP (Spain)	ESP (Spain)	ESP (Spain)	Total Points
1	(France) **Justine Tonso**	20	**25**	20	10	16	**25**	**25**	20	**25**	**25**	20	**25**	13	**269**
2	(Germany) Sofia Wiedenroth	16	13	16	13	**25**	16	20	**25**	20	20	**25**	13	16	**238**
3	(Germany) Antonia Daubermann	11	11	DNS	DNS	11	10	16	16	16	16	11	10	11	**139**
4	(Switzerland) Nathalie Schneitter	DNS	DNS	**25**	20	20	20	DNS	DNS	DNS	DNS	DNS	DNS	20	**105**
5	(Austria) Anna Spielmann	13	16	0	16	13	0	DNS	DNS	DNS	DNS	DNS	20	**25**	**103**

=== Enduro ===
==== Men ====
**Top 5 men's elite standings**
Rank	Rider	AUS (Australia)	AUS (Australia)	ITA (Italy)	AUT (Austria)	ITA (Italy)	FRA (France)	FRA (France)	Total Points
1	(United States) **Richard Rude Jr.**	279	**503**	270	433	377	337	377	**2576**
2	(Canada) Jesse Melamed	204	380	**486**	238	302	309	**524**	**2443**
3	(France) Alex Rudeau	200	146	397	387	415	416	434	**2395**
4	(Canada) Rhys Verner	330	198	420	**504**	237	188	167	**2044**
5	(New Zealand) Charles Murray	171	260	292	323	342	259	287	**1934**

**Top 5 men's under 21 standings**
Rank	Rider	AUS (Australia)	AUS (Australia)	ITA (Italy)	AUT (Austria)	ITA (Italy)	FRA (France)	FRA (France)	Total Points
1	(France) **Lisandru Bertini**	168	183	126	**245**	**242**	**237**		**1075**
2	(Australia) Sascha Kim	**241**	**246**	133	194	116	181		**995**
3	(France) Raphaël Giambi			**231**	156	160	209		**756**
4	(France) Alexis Icardo	113	100	195	123	197	123		**751**
5	(Canada) Johnathan Helly	136	115	127	177	171	136		**747**

==== Women ====
**Top 5 women's elite standings**
Rank	Rider	AUS (Australia)	AUS (Australia)	ITA (Italy)	AUT (Austria)	ITA (Italy)	FRA (France)	FRA (France)	Total Points
1	(France) **Isabeau Courdurier**	**499**	331	401	**492**	**487**	**497**	476	**3183**
2	(France) Morgane Charre	439	298	**494**	409	426	429	**526**	**3021**
3	(United Kingdom) Harriet Harnden	304	456	243	319	298	321	392	**2333**
4	(Italy) Gloria Scarsi	137	214	439	436	337	234	264	**2061**
5	(United Kingdom) Rebecca Baraona	341	**506**	269	228	283	149	236	**2012**

**Top 5 women's under 21 standings**
Rank	Rider	AUS (Australia)	AUS (Australia)	ITA (Italy)	AUT (Austria)	ITA (Italy)	FRA (France)	FRA (France)	Total Points
1	(Canada) **Emmy Lan**	**256**	83	**250**	**250**	**228**	**240**		**1224**
2	(Canada) Elly Hoskin	134	179	146	78	132	102		**693**
3	(France) Lily Planquart			198	202	44	142		**586**
4	(New Zealand) Erice van Leuven	202	**260**						**462**
5	(Italy) Sophie Riva	55	58	100	53	166	69		**448**

=== Marathon ===
**Top 5 men's standings**
Rank	Rider	CZE (Czech Republic)	ITA (Italy)	FRA (France)	USA (United States)	Total Points
1	(Italy) **Fabian Rabensteiner**	**250**	160	100	140	**650**
2	(Germany) Simon Stiebjahn	160	46	150	**250**	**606**
3	(Colombia) Héctor Leonardo Páez	85	78	**250**	95	**508**
4	(Colombia) Diego Arias	0	**250**	140	80	**470**
5	(Italy) Diego Rosa	0	140	200	110	**450**

**Top 5 women's standings**
Rank	Rider	CZE (Czech Republic)	ITA (Italy)	FRA (France)	USA (United States)	Total Points
1	(Bosnia and Herzegovina) **Lejla Njemčević**	**250**	200	200	150	**800**
2	(Germany) Bettina Janas	120	120	150	130	**520**
3	(Lithuania) Kataržina Sosna	200	0	140	160	**500**
4	(Namibia) Vera Looser	DNS	160	**250**	DNS	**410**
5	(France) Estelle Morel	68	150	130	DNS	**348**

== See also ==
- 2023 UCI Cycling World Championships
