= Karen Hanlen =

New Zealand mountain biker

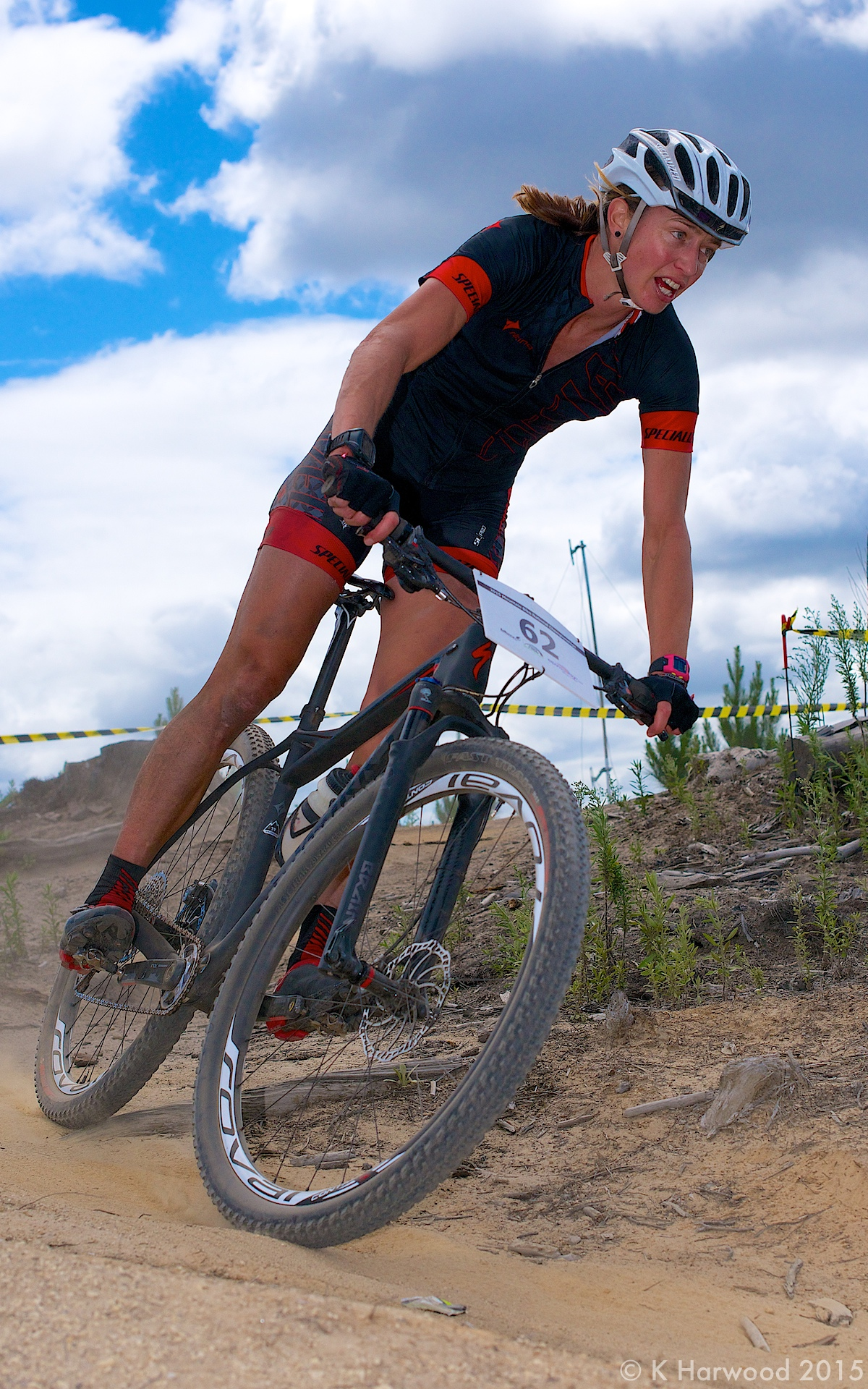
- Hanlen in 2015

Personal information
- Born: 28 March 1980 (age 46) Whakatāne, New Zealand
- Height: 177 cm (5 ft 10 in)
- Weight: 63 kg (139 lb)

Cycling career
- Sport: Cycling
- Discipline: Mountain bike (cross country)
- Role: Rider

Karen Hanlen (born 28 March 1980) is a New Zealand mountain biker. She represented New Zealand at the 2012 Summer Olympics in London, competing in the women's cross-country cycling event.

== Biography ==
Hanlen was born in Whakatāne in 1980. She is married with two children, and works as a physiotherapist at Whakatāne Hospital. In 2010, she switched from mountain running to mountain biking, buying her first performance bike on Trade Me. She was the only woman who represented New Zealand at the 2012 Summer Olympics in mountain biking, beating Rosara Joseph for the sole spot.

== Olympic career ==
Hanlen competed for New Zealand in the women's mountain biking cross country at the 2012 Summer Olympics in London. She finished 18th, with a time of 1:37:54.

== Achievements ==
Year	Result	Event
2012	1st	New Zealand Mountain Bike Championships
2012	1st	New Zealand Mountain Bike Cup (Cross-Country)
2012	1st	Oceania Mountain Bike Championships
2012	8th	UCI Mountain Bike World Cup
2011	2nd	New Zealand Mountain Bike Championships
2011	1st	New Zealand Mountain Bike Cup (Cross-Country)
