= Thomas Griot =

French cyclist (born 2000)

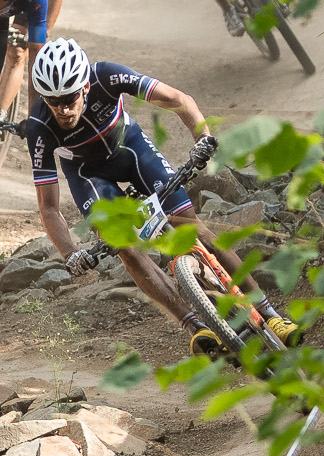
- Griot in 2019

Personal information
- Born: 4 July 1994 (age 32)
- Height: 1.83 m (6 ft 0 in)
- Weight: 69 kg (152 lb)

Cycling career
- Sport: Cycling
- Current team: Canyon CLLCTV XCO
- Discipline: Mountain bike
- Role: Rider

Professional teams
- 2011–2012: R-VTT Morillon –Absalon
- 2017: Materiel-velo.com
- 2019–2021: Massi
- 2022–: Canyon CLLCTV

Thomas Griot (born 4 July 1994) is a French professional cross-country mountain biker.

== Major results ==
2017
1st La Forestière XCO
2018
French Cup

3rd Lourdes
3rd Les Menuires

2019
Copa Catalana

1st Vallnord

2nd Sea Otter Europe
French Cup

2nd Jeumont

4th Cross-country, European Championshisp
2020
2nd Massi chabrieres
Copa Catalana

2nd Corró D'amunt

3rd Cross-country, National Championships
3rd Buthiers MTB XCO
2021
1st Copa Catalana Internacional
Superprestigio

1st Tibi
3rd Arnedo

French Cup

2nd Guéret

UCI XCO World Cup

4th Leogang

2022
1st VTT Chabrieres
National Championships

2nd Cross-country short track
3rd Cross-country

2023
French Cup

1st Les Menuires
3rd Marseilles

5th Overall UCI XCO World Cup

2nd Pal–Arinsal
4th Lenzerheide
5th Nové Město na Moravě

2024
Swiss Bike Cup

1st Lugano

National Championships

2nd Cross-country short track
2nd Cross-country

4th Cross-country, European Championshisp
