= African Women's classification in the Cape Epic =

Absa African Women's Special Jersey
- Sport: Mountain bike
- Competition: Cape Epic
- Awarded for: Women's African best time
- Sponsored by: absa

History
- First award: 2018
- Editions: 2 (as of 2019)
- First winner: Candice Lill (ZAF); Amy Mcdougall (ZAF)
- Most wins: Candice Lill (ZAF); Amy Mcdougall (ZAF); Theresa Ralph (ZAF); Sarah Hill (ZAF) 1 times
- Most recent: Theresa Ralph (ZAF); Sarah Hill (ZAF)

The African Women's classification is a women's classification, the one by which the best African women's team of the Cape Epic is determined. Since 2018, the leader of the African Women's classification wears the Absa African Women's Special Jersey.

== Winners ==
| Year | Team 1st | Winners | Time | GC | Team 2nd | Second place | Time | GC | Team 3rd | Third place | Time | GC | Teams |
|---|---|---|---|---|---|---|---|---|---|---|---|---|---|
| 2018 | dormakaba | Candice Lill (ZAF); Amy Mcdougall (ZAF) | 31:48:17,1 | 4 | Nolands Spar Ladies | Hannele Steyn (ZAF); Jeannie Dreyer (ZAF) | 34:41:34,9 +2:53:17,8 | 8 | Western girls | Nadia Visser (ZAF); Katie Lennard (ZAF) | 35:26:43,8 +4:38:26,7 | 11 | 5 |
| 2019 | Galileo Risk | Theresa Ralph (ZAF); Sarah Hill (ZAF) | 35:01:38,4 | 6 | Land Rover Jaguars | Hannele Steyn (ZAF); Katja Steenkamp (ZAF) | 40:17:55,5 +5:16:17,1 | 8 | T and T | Jeanette Treherne (ZAF); Vivienne Turvey (ZAF) | 45:16.30,5 +10:14:52,1 | 9 | 7 |

== Statistics ==
=== By rider ===
| Rank | Rider | Gold | Silver | Bronze | Total |
|---|---|---|---|---|---|
| 1 | Amy Mcdougall (ZAF) | 1 | 0 | 0 | 1 |
| 1 | Candice Lill (ZAF) | 1 | 0 | 0 | 1 |
| 1 | Sarah Hill (ZAF) | 1 | 0 | 0 | 1 |
| 1 | Theresa Ralph (ZAF) | 1 | 0 | 0 | 1 |
| 5 | Hannele Steyn (ZAF) | 0 | 2 | 0 | 2 |
| 6 | Jeannie Dreyer (ZAF) | 0 | 1 | 0 | 1 |
| 6 | Katja Steenkamp (ZAF) | 0 | 1 | 0 | 1 |
| 8 | Jeanette Treherne (ZAF) | 0 | 0 | 1 | 1 |
| 8 | Katie Lennard (ZAF) | 0 | 0 | 1 | 1 |
| 8 | Nadia Visser (ZAF) | 0 | 0 | 1 | 1 |
| 8 | Vivienne Turvey (ZAF) | 0 | 0 | 1 | 1 |
| Totals (11 entries) | | 4 | 4 | 4 | 12 |

=== By duo ===
| Rank | Duo | Gold | Silver | Bronze | Total |
|---|---|---|---|---|---|
| 1 | Candice Lill (ZAF) Amy Mcdougall (ZAF) | 1 | 0 | 0 | 1 |
| 1 | Theresa Ralph (ZAF) Sarah Hill (ZAF) | 1 | 0 | 0 | 1 |
| 3 | Hannele Steyn (ZAF) Jeannie Dreyer (ZAF) | 0 | 1 | 0 | 1 |
| 3 | Hannele Steyn (ZAF) Katja Steenkamp (ZAF) | 0 | 1 | 0 | 1 |
| 5 | Jeanette Treherne (ZAF) Vivienne Turvey (ZAF) | 0 | 0 | 1 | 1 |
| 5 | Nadia Visser (ZAF) Katie Lennard (ZAF) | 0 | 0 | 1 | 1 |
| Totals (6 entries) | | 2 | 2 | 2 | 6 |

=== By nationality ===
| Rank | Nation | Gold | Silver | Bronze | Total |
|---|---|---|---|---|---|
| 1 | South Africa (ZAF) | 4 | 4 | 4 | 12 |
| Totals (1 entries) | | 4 | 4 | 4 | 12 |
