= Andreas Kolb =

Austrian mountain biker (born 1996)

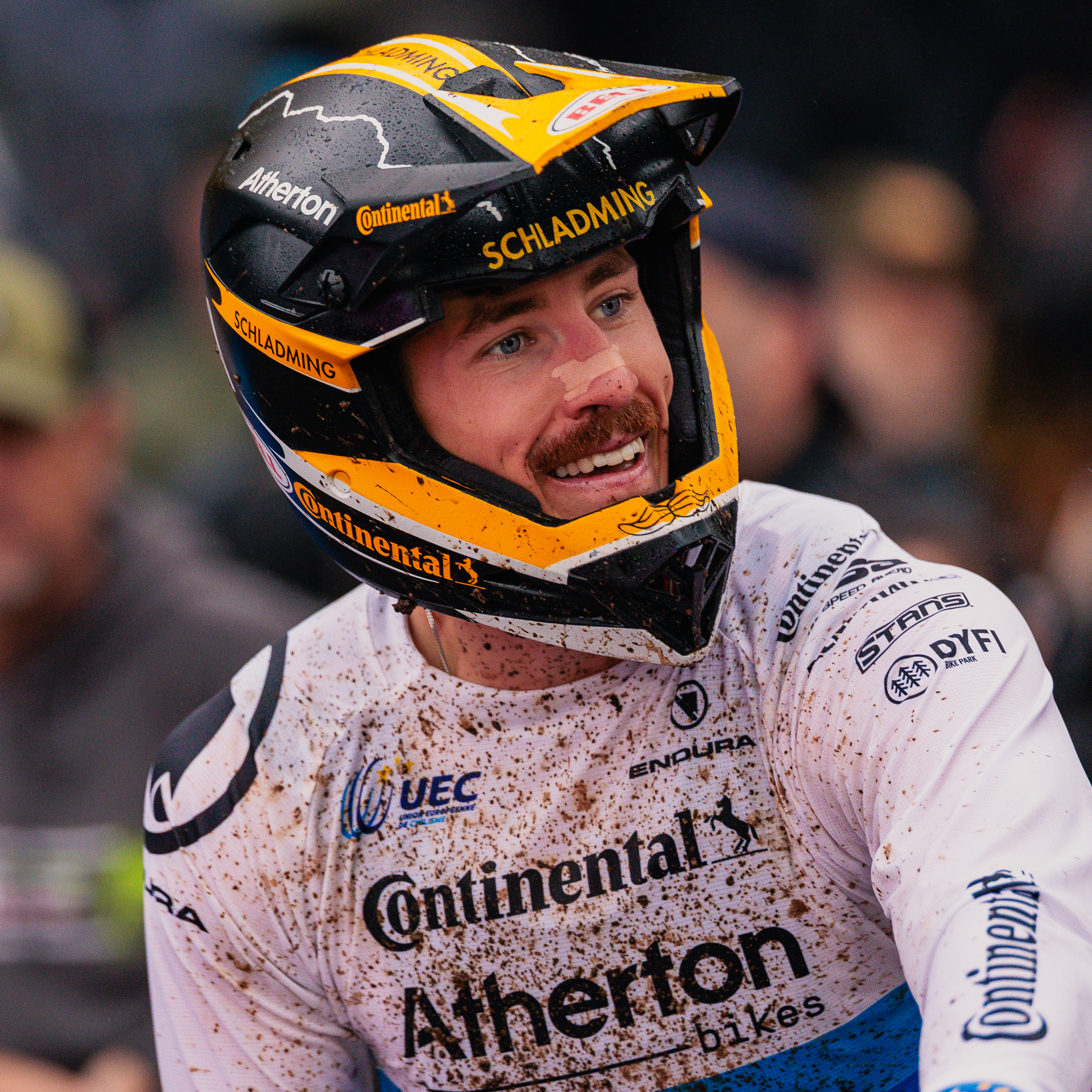

Personal information
- Nickname: Andi kolb
- Born: 23 March 1996 (age 30)
- Height: 185 cm (6 ft 1 in)

Cycling career
- Sport: Cycling
- Current team: Santa Cruz Syndicate
- Discipline: Downhill
- Role: Rider

Professional teams
- 2019–2020: Gamux Factory Racing
- 2021–: Continental Atherton
Medal record
Representing Austria
Mountain bike racing
World Championships
Silver medal – second place	2023 Glasgow	Downhill
European Championships
Gold medal – first place	2022 Maribor	Downhill
Gold medal – first place	2024 Champéry	Downhill

Andreas Kolb (born 23 March 1996) is an Austrian downhill mountain biker.

In 2023, he finished second in the UCI Downhill World Championships in Fort William, Scotland. He also won the downhill race at the 2022 European Mountain Bike Championships.

In 2022, he was the first Austrian to obtain a downhill podium at the World Cup, going on to finish 4th overall. The following year, he won the Leogang round of the 2023 UCI Downhill World Cup, making him the first Austrian male to win a downhill world cup race.

== Major results ==
2022
1st European Downhill Championships
4th Overall UCI Downhill World Cup

2nd Val di Sole
3rd Snowshoe

2023
UCI Downhill World Cup

1st Leogang

2nd UCI Downhill World Championships
