= Vera Andreeva =

Russian Olympian mountain biker

Personal information
- Full name: Vera Sergeyevna Andreyeva
- Born: 10 May 1988 (age 38) Cheboksary, Russian SFSR
- Height: 1.67 m (5 ft 5 1/2 in)
- Weight: 64 kg (141 lb)

Cycling career
- Sport: Cycling
- Current team: Dynamo Cheboksary
- Discipline: Mountain biking
- Role: Rider
- Rider type: Cross-country

Vera Sergeyevna Andreyeva (also Vera Andreeva, Russian: Вера Сергеевна Андреева; born May 10, 1988, in Cheboksary) is a Russian amateur mountain biker. She represented her nation Russia, as a 20-year-old junior, at the 2008 Summer Olympics, and later finished second in the women's elite cross-country race at the 2012 Russian Mountain Biking Championships.

Andreeva qualified for the Russian squad, along with her teammate and top medal contender Irina Kalentieva, in the women's cross-country race at the 2008 Summer Olympics in Beijing by receiving one of the nation's two available berths based on her top-ten performance from the UCI Mountain Biking World Rankings. With two laps left to complete the race, Andreeva suffered a heat-related fatigue under Beijing's hot and humid weather, and instead decided to pull off from the course, finishing only in twenty-third place.
