= Cycling at the 2012 Summer Olympics – Women's cross-country =

Women's cross-country cycling at the Games of the XXX Olympiad
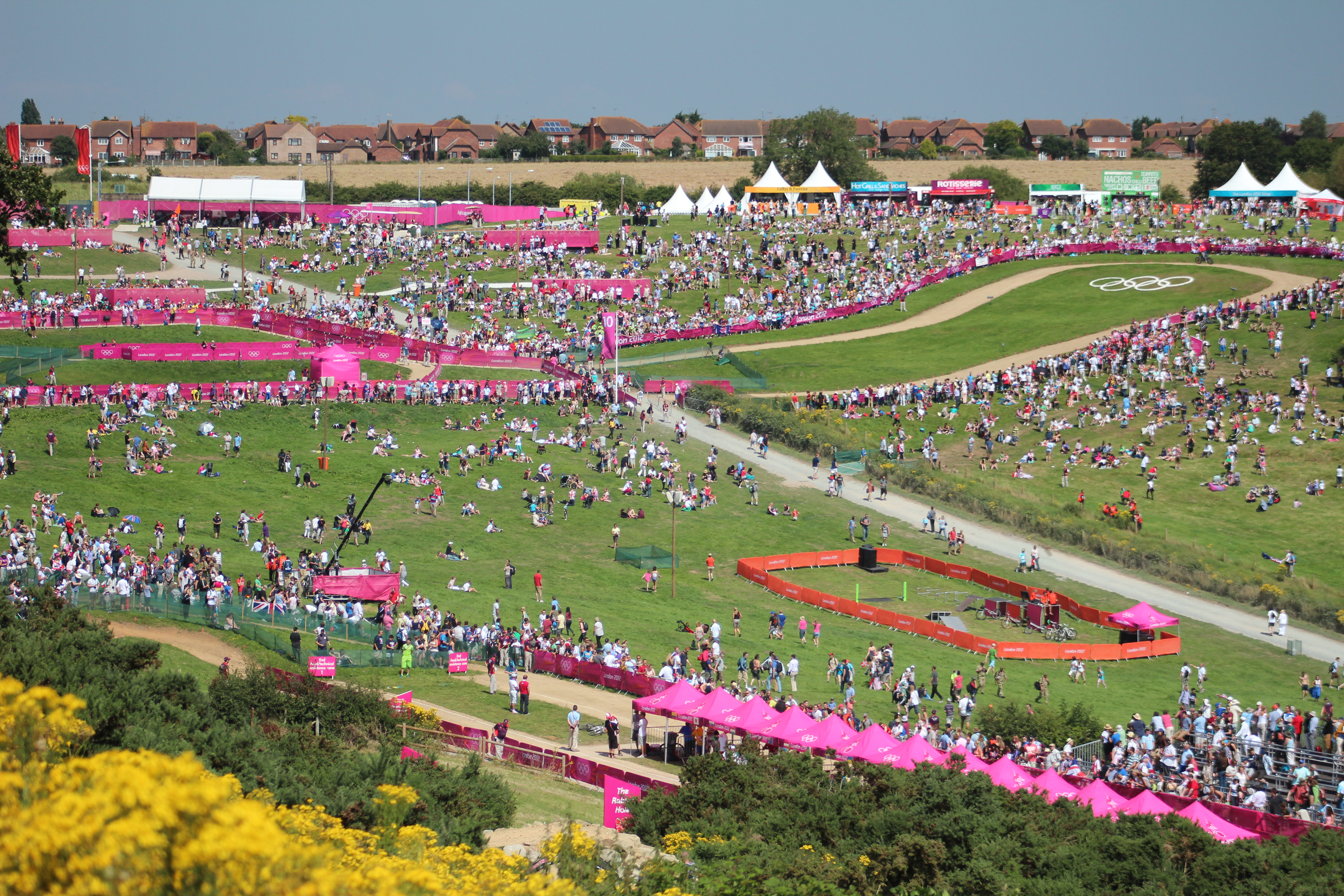
- Venue: Hadleigh Farm
- Date: 11 August 2012
- Competitors: 30 from 24 nations

Medalists
1st place, gold medalist(s)		Julie Bresset	France
2nd place, silver medalist(s)		Sabine Spitz	Germany
3rd place, bronze medalist(s)		Georgia Gould	United States

The women's cross-country cycling event at the 2012 Olympic Games in London took place at Hadleigh Farm on 11 August.

Julie Bresset from France won the gold medal — the country's first in cycling at the 2012 Games. Germany's Sabine Spitz won silver and Georgia Gould of the United States took bronze.

== Competition format ==
The competition began at 12:30 pm with a mass-start, and involved six laps around the 4.8 km course at Hadleigh Farm in Essex. The distance of the race was 29.3 km.

== Schedule ==
All times are British Summer Time

Date	Time	Round
Saturday 11 August 2012	12:30	Final

== Result ==
The entry list was published on 26 July.

Rank	Rider	Country	Time
1st place, gold medalist(s)	Julie Bresset	France	1:30:52
2nd place, silver medalist(s)	Sabine Spitz	Germany	1:31:54
3rd place, bronze medalist(s)	Georgia Gould	United States	1:32:00
4	Irina Kalentieva	Russia	1:32:33
5	Esther Süss	Switzerland	1:32:46
6	Alexandra Engen	Sweden	1:33:08
7	Aleksandra Dawidowicz	Poland	1:33:20
8	Annie Last	Great Britain	1:33:47
9	Catharine Pendrel	Canada	1:34:28
10	Tanja Žakelj	Slovenia	1:34:41
11	Lea Davison	United States	1:35:14
12	Shi Qinglan	China	1:35:28
13	Yana Belomoyna	Ukraine	1:35:46
14	Kateřina Nash	Czech Republic	1:36:22
15	Elisabeth Osl	Austria	1:36:47
16	Adelheid Morath	Germany	1:37:17
17	Eva Lechner	Italy	1:37:36
18	Karen Hanlen	New Zealand	1:37:54
19	Katrin Leumann	Switzerland	1:38:23
20	Rie Katayama	Japan	1:38:26
21	Janka Števková	Slovakia	1:39:05
22	Paula Gorycka	Poland	1:39:18
DSQ	Blaža Klemenčič	Slovenia	1:39:42
23	Emily Batty	Canada	1:40:37
24	Rebecca Henderson	Australia	1:41:35
25	Pauline Ferrand-Prévot	France	1:42:21
26	Barbara Benkó	Hungary	1:43:24
27	Candice Neethling	South Africa	1:45:03
–	Gunn-Rita Dahle Flesjå	Norway	DNF
–	Laura Abril	Colombia	DNF
–	Annika Langvad	Denmark	DNS
