= Julie Bresset =

French mountain bike cyclist

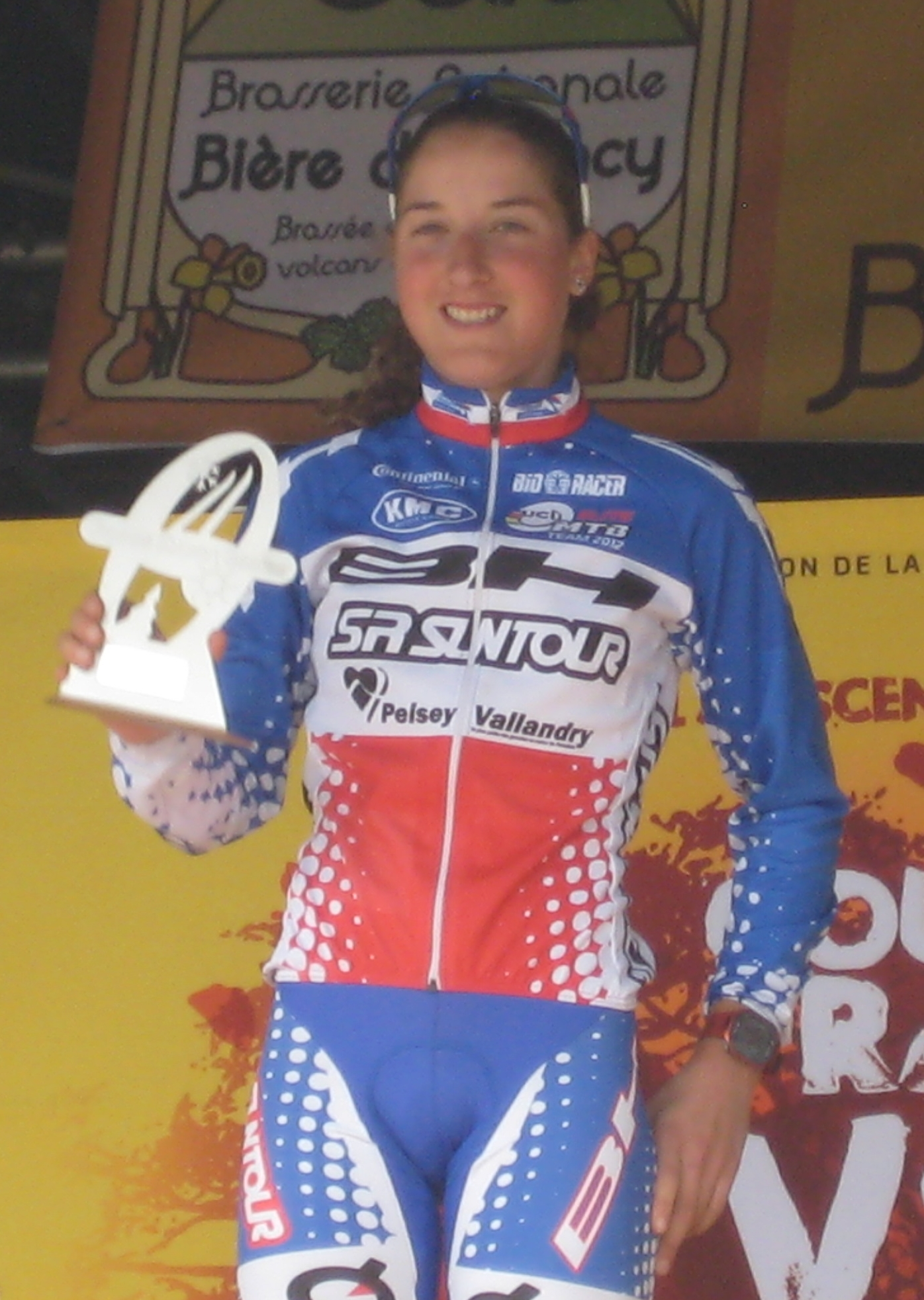
- Julie Bresset in 2012

Personal information
- Born: 9 June 1989 (age 37) Saint-Brieuc, France

Cycling career
- Sport: Cycling
- Discipline: Mountain Bike (Cross Country)
- Role: Rider
Medal record
Women's mountain bike racing
Representing France
Olympic Games
Gold medal – first place	2012 London	Cross-country
World Championships
Gold medal – first place	2012 Leogang and Saalfelden	Cross-country
Gold medal – first place	2013 Pietermaritzburg	Cross-country

Julie Bresset (born 9 June 1989) is a French mountain bike cyclist, who won the cross-country mountain bike race in the 2012 Summer Olympics.

She was the overall winner of the World Cup mountain bike cross-country series in 2011 and finished top of women's elite cross-country ranking at the end of 2011.

She won the French national cross-country mountain bike championships in 2010, 2011 and 2012.

At her first Olympics in 2012, she took the lead, which she never relinquished, from the second lap. By the third lap, the gap between her and the chasing group was already twenty seconds. This was her first international individual title at the senior level. She was on the start list of the 2018 Cross Country European Championships and finished 11. .
