= Maja Włoszczowska =

Polish mountain biker

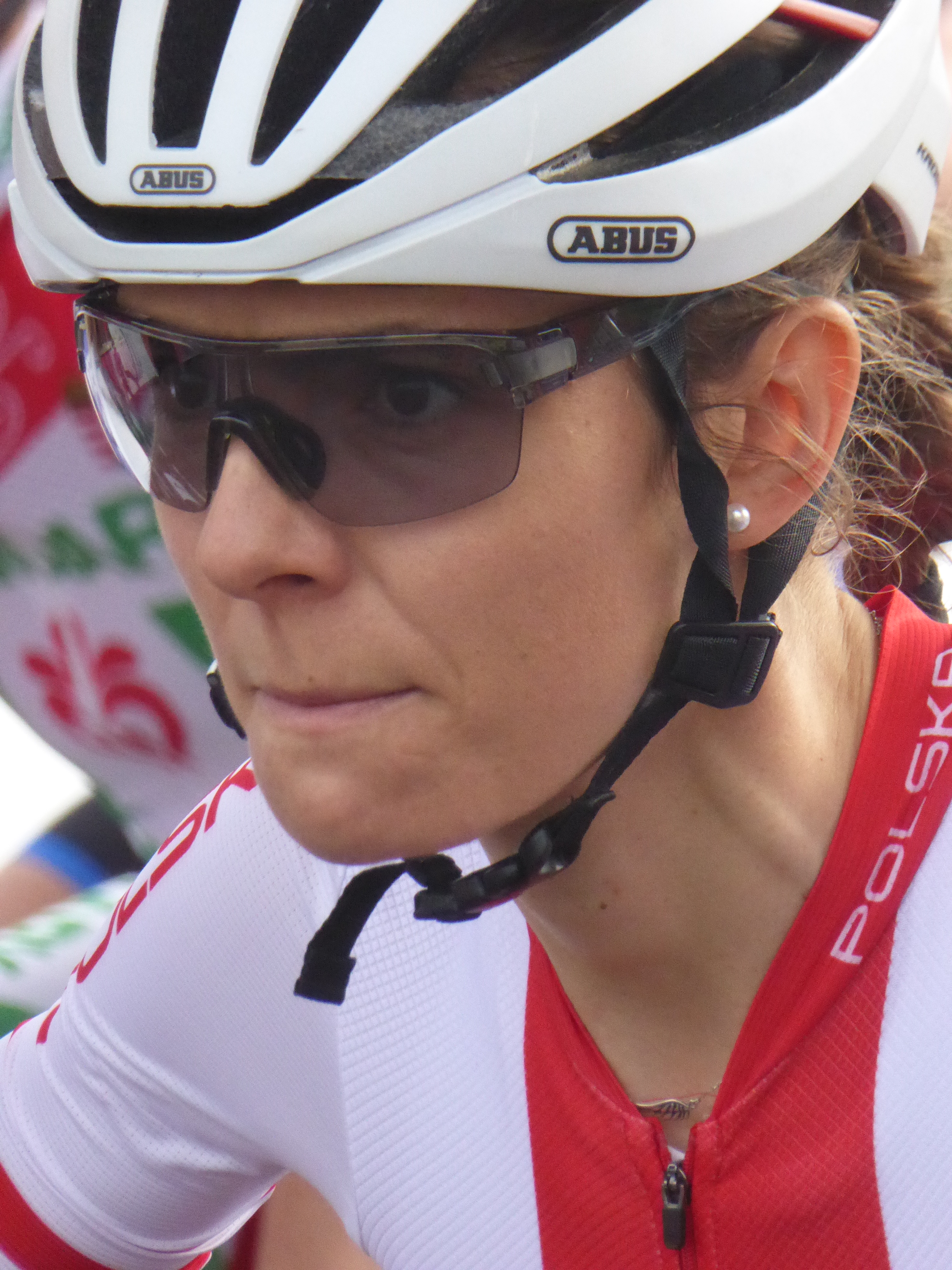
- Włoszczowska at the 2018 European Mountain Bike Championships

Personal information
- Full name: Maja Martyna Włoszczowska
- Born: 9 November 1983 (age 42) Warsaw, Poland
- Height: 170 cm (5 ft 7 in)
- Weight: 54 kg (119 lb)

Cycling career
- Sport: Cycling
- Current team: Retired
- Discipline: Mountain bike racing
- Role: Rider
- Rider type: Cross-country

Amateur team
- 2022: Toruński Klub Kolarski Pacific–Nestlé Fitness

Professional teams
- 2003–2006: Lotto Team
- 2007–2008: Halls Professional MTB Team
- 2009–2012: CCC Polkowice
- 2013: Giant Pro XC Team
- 2014: Liv Pro XC Team
- 2015–2021: Kross Racing Team
Medal record
Representing Poland
Women's mountain bike racing
Event	1st	2nd	3rd
Olympic Games	0	2	0
World Championships	1	5	2
European Championships	1	4	1
European Games	0	0	1
Total	2	11	4
Olympic Games
Silver medal – second place	2008 Beijing	Cross-country
Silver medal – second place	2016 Rio de Janeiro	Cross-country
World Championships
Gold medal – first place	2010 Mont Sainte-Anne	Cross-country
Silver medal – second place	2004 Les Gets	Cross-country
Silver medal – second place	2005 Livigno	Cross-country
Silver medal – second place	2007 Fort William	Team relay
Silver medal – second place	2011 Champéry	Cross-country
Silver medal – second place	2013 Pietermaritzburg	Cross-country
Bronze medal – third place	2004 Les Gets	Team relay
Bronze medal – third place	2006 Rotorua	Team relay
European Championships
Gold medal – first place	2009 Zoetermeer	Cross-country
Silver medal – second place	2004 Wałbrzych	Cross-country
Silver medal – second place	2005 Kluisbergen	Cross-country
Silver medal – second place	2010 Haifa	Cross-country
Silver medal – second place	2011 Dohňany	Cross-country
Bronze medal – third place	2013 Bern	Cross-country
European Games
Bronze medal – third place	2015 Baku	Cross-country
Women's mountain bike marathon
World Championships
Gold medal – first place	2003 Lugano	Marathon
Silver medal – second place	2021 Elba	Marathon
European Championships
Silver medal – second place	2009 Tartu	Marathon

Maja Martyna Włoszczowska (Polish pronunciation: [ˈmaja marˈtɨna vwɔʂˈt͡ʂɔfska]; born 9 November 1983) is a Polish former mountain biker. She is the 2008 and 2016 Olympic silver medalist in cross-country cycling. She is a member of the International Olympic Committee (IOC).

== Career ==
Born in Warsaw, Włoszczowska is a graduate of financial and insurance mathematics, which she studied at the Faculty of Fundamental Technological Problems of the Wroclaw University of Technology.

Włoszczowska won the silver medal in mountain biking at the 2008 Summer Olympics in Beijing, China. Since 2009, she has lent her name to a cross-country race in her home town of Jelenia Góra, called "Jelenia Góra Trophy Maja Włoszczowska MTB Race". Riders such as Miguel Martinez, Catharine Pendrel or Mary McConneloug have taken part in it.

Włoszczowska became the world champion in elite cross-country mountain biking in 2010. At the 2011 World Championships, she was well-positioned to retain her title, but lost over a minute due to a flat tire and finished in second place, 28 seconds behind Catharine Pendrel.

In June 2015, she won the bronze medal in cross-country mountain biking at the inaugural European Games.

In August 2016, Włoszczowska won the silver medal in mountain biking at the Summer Olympics in Rio de Janeiro, Brazil. She was on the start list of 2018 Cross Country European Championships and finished 4.

== Awards ==
For her sport achievements, she received:
Golden Cross of Merit in 2008.

== Major achievements ==
2003
1st in UCI Mountain Bike Marathon World Championships, Lugano, Switzerland.
2004
2nd in UCI Mountain Bike World Championships, Les Gets, France.
2005
2nd in UCI Mountain Bike World Championships, Livigno, ITALIA.
2nd in UCI Mountain Bike European Championships, Kluisbergen, Belgium.
2006
7th in World Cup MTB XCO#1, Curaçao.
4th in World Cup MTB XCO#2, Madrid, Spain.
13th in World Cup MTM XCO#3, Spa Francorchamps, Belgium.
12th in World Cup MTM XCO#4, Fort William, Great Britain.
6th in UCI Mountain Bike European Championships, Chies d'Alpago, ITALIA.
4th in UCI Mountain Bike World Championships, Rotorua, New Zealand.
8th in World Cup MTB XCO#6, Schladming, Austria.
2007
13th in World Cup MTB XCO#1, Houffalize, Belgium.
8th in World Cup MTB XCO#2, Offenburg, Germany.
7th in UCI Mountain Bike European Championships, Cappadocia, Turkey.
4th in UCI Mountain Bike Marathon European Championships, Sankt Wendel, Germany.
2008
12th in World Cup MTB XCO#2, Offenburg, Germany.
18th in UCI Mountain Bike European Championships, Sankt Wendel, Germany.
5th in UCI Mountain Bike World Championships, Val di Sole, ITALIA.
1st in Polish MTB National Championships.
2nd in Women's cross-country at the 2008 Summer Olympics in Beijing, China.
1st in World Cup MTB XCO#9, Schladming, Austria.
2009
1st in European XC Continental Championships, Zoetermeer, Netherlands.
2010
1st in World Cup MTB XCO#5, Val di Sol, Italy.
Elite Women's XC World Championships 2010 – Mont-Sainte-Anne.
2011
2nd in Elite Women's XC World Championships – Champéry, Switzerland.
2012
1st in World Cup MTB XCO#1, Pietermaritzburg, South Africa.
3rd in World Cup MTB XCO#2, Houffalize, Belgium.
2013
2nd in World Cup MTB XCO#1, Albstadt, Germany.
2nd in World Cup MTB XCO#2, Nove Město na Moravě, Czech Republic.
3rd in European Championships, Bern, Switzerland

Summer Olympics
Preceded by Karol Bielecki	Flagbearer for Poland; Tokyo 2020; With: Paweł Korzeniowski	Succeeded by Anita Włodarczyk; Przemysław Zamojski
