= Muriel Furrer =

Swiss cyclist (2006–2024)

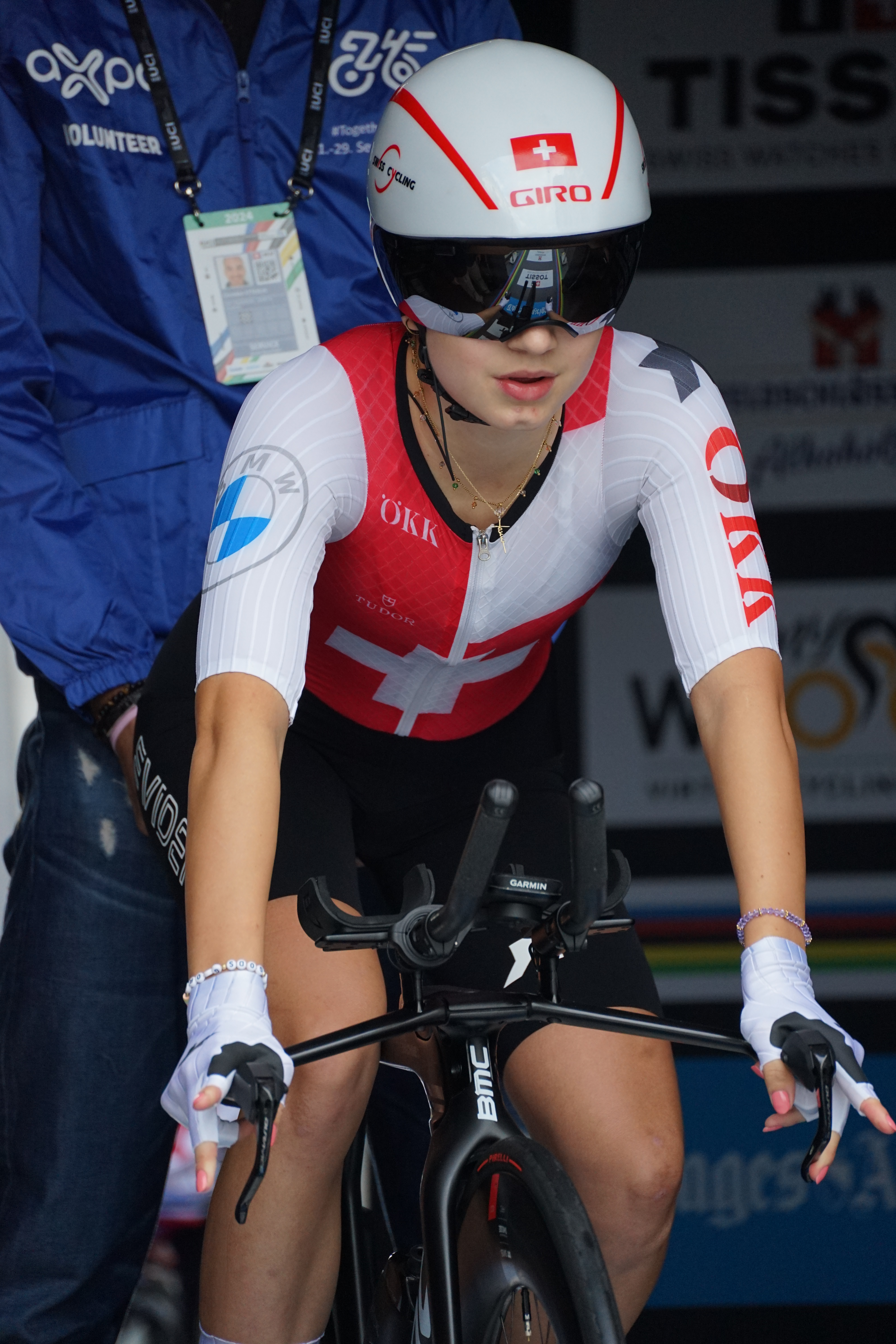
- Furrer at the 2024 UCI Road World Championships

Personal information
- Born: 1 July 2006
- Died: 27 September 2024 (aged 18) Zurich, Switzerland

Cycling career
- Sport: Cycling
- Disciplines: Mountain biking; Road; Cyclo-cross
- Role: Rider
Medal record
Representing Switzerland
Women's mountain bike racing
European Championships
Bronze medal – third place	2024 Cheile Grădiștei	Mixed relay

Muriel Furrer (1 July 2006 – 27 September 2024) was a Swiss mountain biker, road cyclist, and cyclo crosser. She won a bronze medal in the mixed relay at the 2024 European Mountain Bike Championships. In road cycling, she was the runner-up at the national junior championships in both the time trial and road race events.

Furrer died from severe skull and brain injuries sustained in a crash during the 2024 UCI Road World Championships on 27 September 2024, at the age of 18. Her crash was not witnessed by anybody, and she was not found for more than an hour. At 11:09, the first cyclists passed the Sechseläutenplatz for the first time; Furrer's split time was not recorded. At 11:54, the race ended with Cat Ferguson as the winner. At 12:15 the men's paracycling race was started as scheduled, on a route that passed by the crash site. Furrer was found by security personnel who went searching for her. At 12:45, TV images of the paracycling race showed several police cars and an ambulance near the site.

The UCI released a statement saying that all World Championships races would be cancelled. However, the event was continued at the express request of Furrer's parents and family, with a series of tributes and memorials.
