= Dellys Starr =

Australian mountain biker (born 1976)

Personal information
- Full name: Dellys Franke-Starr
- Born: 2 October 1976 (age 50) Melbourne, Victoria, Australia
- Height: 1.66 m (5 ft 5 in)
- Weight: 61 kg (134 lb)

Cycling career
- Sport: Cycling
- Current team: Retired
- Discipline: Mountain biking
- Role: Rider
- Rider type: Cross-country

Dellys Starr (née Franke) (born 2 October 1976 in Melbourne) is a retired Australian amateur mountain biker. She has won two Australian national championship titles in the women's cross-country race (2006 and 2008), and later represented her nation Australia, as a 31-year-old veteran, at the 2006 Commonwealth Games in her home turf and at the 2008 Summer Olympics. Starr currently resides in Colorado Springs, Colorado, where she shares with her husband and American cyclist Ryan Starr.

Competing for the Australian cycling team since 1997, Starr soared higher on the international mountain biking scene, as she took home her first ever Australian national championship title in 2006. Strong results landed her a spot on the nation's official roster at the Commonwealth Games in Melbourne, where she finished fifth in the women's cross-country race.

Starr qualified for the Australian squad, as a lone female rider, in the women's cross-country race at the 2008 Summer Olympics in Beijing by finishing first from the Australian Championships and by receiving an invitational berth from the Union Cycliste Internationale based on her best performance at the UCI World Championships. With only two laps left to go before crossing the finish line, Starr suffered a heat-related fatigue and instead pulled off directly from a 4.8-km sturdy, treacherous cross-country course, finishing only in twenty-sixth place.
