= 2021 UCI Mountain Bike Marathon World Championships =

- Venue: Elba, Italy
- Date(s): 2 October 2021
- Nations participating: 30
- Cyclists participating: 164
- Events: 2

The 2021 UCI Mountain Bike Marathon World Championships took place in Elba, Italy on 2 October 2021. It was the 19th edition of the UCI Mountain Bike Marathon World Championships.

== Medal summary ==
Event	Gold		Silver		Bronze	
Men	Andreas Seewald; Germany	6:02.03	Diego Arias; Colombia	6:04.27	José Dias; Portugal	6:07.34
Women	Mona Mitterwallner; Austria	4:48.54	Maja Włoszczowska; Poland	4:50.07	Natalia Fischer; Spain	4:56.31
