= 2024 European Mountain Bike Championships =

- Venue: (Romania) Cheile Grădiștei (Switzerland) Champéry (Denmark) Viborg
- Date(s): 8 May – 18 August
- Events: 9

The 2024 European Mountain Bike Championships was the 35th edition of the European Mountain Bike Championships, an annual mountain biking competition organized by the Union Européenne de Cyclisme (UEC). The championships comprised five disciplines: downhill, cross-country cycling (XC), cross-country short circuit (XCC), cross-country team relay (XCR), and cross-country marathon (XCM).

== Dates and venues ==
- (Romania) Cheile Grădiștei: 8–12 May (cross-country, cross-country short circuit, team relay)
- (Switzerland) Champéry: 9–11 August (downhill)
- (Denmark) Viborg: 18 August (cross-country marathon)

== Medal table ==
Rank	Nation	Gold	Silver	Bronze	Total
1	Netherlands (NED)	2	1	0	3
2	Italy (ITA)	2	0	3	5
3	Austria (AUT)	1	2	0	3
4	France (FRA)	1	1	2	4
4	Germany (GER)	1	1	2	4
6	Denmark (DEN)	1	1	0	2
7	Switzerland (SUI)	1	0	2	3
8	Bosnia and Herzegovina (BIH)	0	1	0	1
8	Great Britain (GBR)	0	1	0	1
8	Spain (ESP)	0	1	0	1
Totals (10 entries)		9	9	9	27

== Medal summary ==
=== Cross-country ===
Event	Gold		Silver		Bronze	
Men	(Italy) Simone Avondetto	1:14:57	(Denmark) Simon Andreassen	1:15:47	(Germany) Julian Schelb	1:16:04
Women	(Netherlands) Puck Pieterse	1:28:09	(Austria) Mona Mitterwallner	1:29:21	(Germany) Nina Benz	1:30:24

=== Cross-country short circuit ===
Event	Gold		Silver		Bronze	
Men	(Denmark) Simon Andreassen	23:47	(Germany) Julian Schelb	24:25	(Italy) Luca Braidot	24:25
Women	(France) Pauline Ferrand-Prévot	24:49	(Netherlands) Puck Pieterse	25:00	(Switzerland) Nicole Koller	25:31

=== Cross-country marathon ===
Event	Gold		Silver		Bronze	
Men	(Germany) Lukas Baum	3:19:36	(Spain) David Valero	3:19:36	(Italy) Fabian Rabensteiner	3:19:37
Women	(Netherlands) Rosa Van Doorn	4:01:25	(Bosnia and Herzegovina) Lejla Njemčević	4:01:40	(Italy) Claudia Peretti	4:01:43

=== Team Relay ===
Event	Gold		Silver		Bronze	
Mixed Team	Italy; Simone Avondetto; Matteo Siffredi; Chiara Teocchi; Giada Martinoli; Valentina Corvi; Mattia Stenico	1:01:36	France; Yannis Musy; Nicolas Kalanquin; Olivia Onesti; Tatiana Tournut; Anaïs Moulin; Titouan Carod	1:01:56	Switzerland; Finn Treudler; Nicolas Halter; Ramona Forchini; Anina Hutter; Muriel Furrer; Thomas Litscher	1:02:32

=== Downhill ===
Event	Gold		Silver		Bronze	
Men	(Austria) Andreas Kolb	3:02.61	(United Kingdom) Matt Walker	3:05.59	(France) Loïc Martin	3:05.85
Women	(Switzerland) Lisa Baumann	3:33.50	(Austria) Valentina Höll	3:35.35	(France) Marine Cabirou	3:35.49
