= 2024 UCI Mountain Bike Marathon World Championships =

- Venue: Snowshoe, United States
- Date: 22 September 2024
- Events: 2

The 2024 UCI Mountain Bike Marathon World Championships took place on 22 September 2024 in Snowshoe, United States. It was the 22nd edition of the UCI Mountain Bike Marathon World Championships. The course was 104km long and had almost 2000m of ascent.

== Medal summary ==
| Event | Gold | | Silver | | Bronze | |
|---|---|---|---|---|---|---|
| Men | Simon Andreassen; Denmark | 4:33:08 | Christopher Blevins; United States | 4:33:18 | David Valero; Spain | 4:33:20 |
| Women | Mona Mitterwallner; Austria | 5:15:06 | Sina Frei; Switzerland | 5:15:32 | Candice Lill; South Africa | 5:16:16 |
