= 2023 UCI Mountain Bike Marathon World Championships =

Scottish bike championship

- Venue: Glentress Forest, Scotland
- Date(s): 6 August 2023
- Events: 2

The 2023 UCI Mountain Bike Marathon World Championships took place on 6 August 2023 in Glentress Forest, Scotland, as part of the inaugural UCI Cycling World Championships. It was the 21st edition of the UCI Mountain Bike Marathon World Championships.

== Medal summary ==
Event	Gold		Silver		Bronze	
Men	Henrique Avancini; Brazil	4:14:42	Martin Stošek; Czech Republic	4:15.10	Lukas Baum; Germany	4:16.25
Women	Mona Mitterwallner; Austria	5:07:50	Candice Lill; South Africa	5:08.44	Adelheid Morath; Germany	5:17.40
