= Candice Lill =

South African cyclist (born 1992)

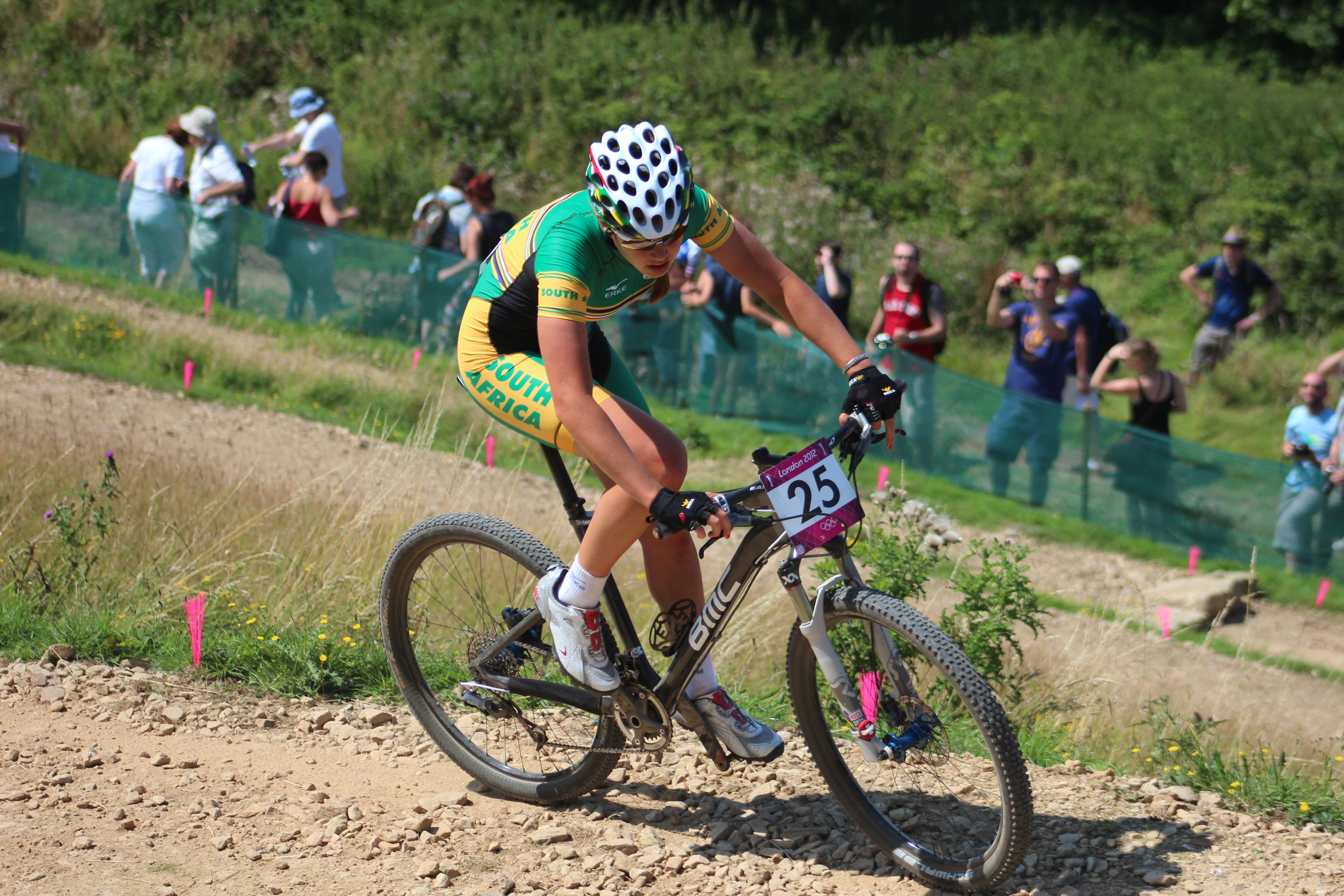
- Candice Lill at the 2012 Summer Olympics

Personal information
- Full name: Candice Lill
- Born: Candice Neethling; 15 February 1992 (age 34) Port Shepstone, South Africa
- Height: 1.70 m (5 ft 7 in)
- Weight: 60 kg (132 lb)

Cycling career
- Sport: Cycling
- Disciplines: Mountain biking; Road
- Role: Rider
- Rider type: Cross-country

Amateur teams
- 2011: Bizhub–Specialized
- 2019: Brújula Bike Racing Team

Major wins
- Single-day races and Classics National Time Trial Championships (2021) Mountain bike Cape Epic (2026)
Medal record
Representing South Africa
Women's mountain bike racing
Commonwealth Games
Bronze medal – third place	2022 Birmingham	Cross-country
African Continental Championships
Gold medal – first place	2024 Casablanca	Cross-Country
Gold medal – first place	2024 Casablanca	Short track
Women's cross-country marathon
World Championships
Silver medal – second place	2023 Glasgow	Women's
Bronze medal – third place	2024 Snowshoe	Women's

Candice Lill (née Neethling; born 15 February 1992) is a South African cyclist who competes in the Cross-country and road bicycle racing disciplines of the sport.

== Life ==
At the 2012 Summer Olympics, Lill competed in the Women's cross-country at Hadleigh Farm, finishing in 28th (last) place. She participated at the 2013 World Championships which were held in Pietermaritzburg.

No South African cross country cyclists qualified for the 2016 Olympics, and Lill herself spent that time focussing on road racing, returning to cross country cycling in 2018. Lill participated in the Elite Cross-country World Championships in 2018, 2019 and 2020, and the 2020 Olympics.

She was third in Birmingham at the 2022 Commonwealth Games and she won a silver medal in the following year at the UCI Marathon World Championships.

== Personal life ==
She is married to fellow South African cyclist, Darren Lill.

== Major results ==
=== Mountain bike ===
2009
3rd Cross-country, UCI World Junior Championships
2012
2nd Cross-country, National Championships
2013
2nd Cross-country, African Under-23 Championships
National Championships

2nd Under-23 cross-country
3rd Marathon

2014
1st Cross-country, African Under-23 Championships
3rd Cross-country, National Championships
2019
1st Cross-country, National Championships
3rd Cross-country, African Championships
2022
3rd Cross-country, Commonwealth Games
2023
2nd Marathon, UCI World Championships
2024
UCI XCO World Cup

2nd Les Gets
3rd Val di Sole

4th Cross-country, UCI World Championships
3rd Marathon, UCI World Championships
2026
1st Overall Cape Epic (with Alessandra Keller)

=== Road ===
2015
KZN Autumn Series

7th Hibiscus Cycle Classic
10th Freedom Day Classic

2021
1st Time trial, National Championships
