= Lejla Njemčević =

Bosnian mountain bike cyclist (born 1994)

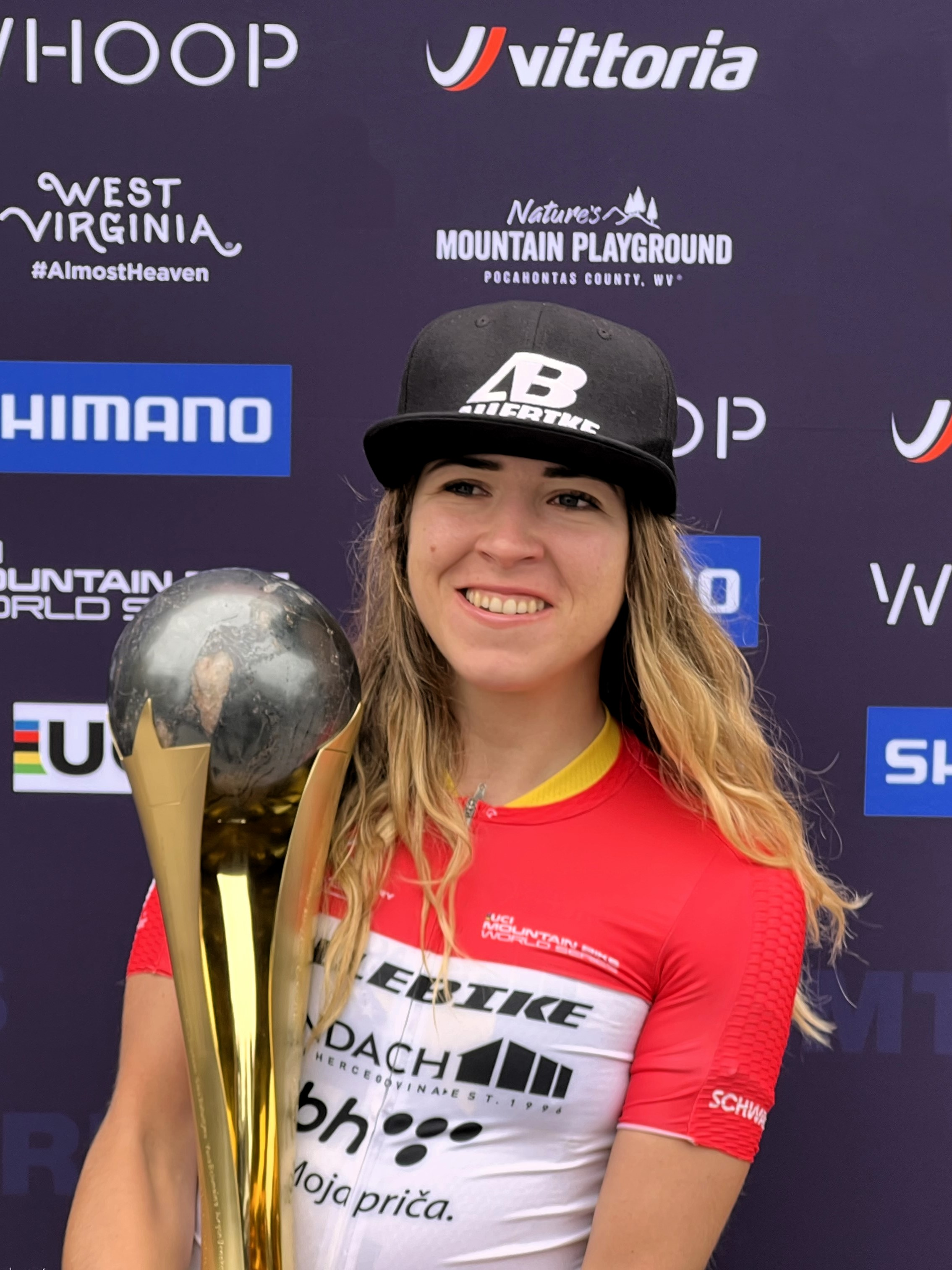
- Njemčević in 2023

Personal information
- Born: Lejla Tanović; 19 June 1994 (age 32) Udine, Italy
- Education: Master of Laws (LL.M.); MBA in Sports Law
- Height: 160 cm (5 ft 3 in)
- Weight: 53 kg (117 lb)
- Website: www.lejlamtb.ba

Sport
- Country: Bosnia and Herzegovina
- Sport: Mountain bike racing
- Club: Klub brdskog biciklizma "Puls"
- Team: Orbea team
- Turned pro: 2014
- Coached by: Amar Njemčević

Achievements and titles
- Regional finals: 6 time Balkan champion
- National finals: 22 time national champion
- Highest world ranking: 1st on UCI ranking
- Personal best: 15 UCI World Cup medals
Medal record
Women's cross-country cycling
Representing Bosnia and Herzegovina
European Championships
Silver medal – second place	2024 Viborg	Cross-country marathon
2023 UCI Mountain Bike World Cup
Gold medal – first place	2023 Czech Republic
Silver medal – second place	2023 Italy
Silver medal – second place	2023 France
UCI Balkan Championship
Silver medal – second place	2014 North Macedonia	U23
Silver medal – second place	2015 Greece	elite
Gold medal – first place	2016 Montenegro	elite
Gold medal – first place	2017 Greece	elite
Gold medal – first place	2018 Romania	elite
Gold medal – first place	2019 Serbia	elite
Gold medal – first place	2021 BiH	elite
Gold medal – first place	2026 Romania	elite
- Updated on 24 October 2023

Lejla Njemčević (née Tanović, born 19 June 1994) is an Italian-born Bosnian mountain bike cyclist and cross-country marathon discipline specialist. Considered one of the most successful marathon cyclists in the world, she was the overall winner of the cross-country marathon at the 2023 UCI Mountain Bike World Cup, and the overall winner of the 2022 UCI Mountain Bike Marathon Series. Competing at the highest level of the sport, Njemčević holds a remarkable record of 15 medals at UCI World Cup races.

She made history by becoming the first cyclist from Bosnia and Herzegovina to win a European Championship medal in any cycling discipline, securing the silver medal at the UEC 2024 European Mountain Bike Championships in Viborg, Denmark. Demonstrating sustained dominance, she reached the number one position on the UCI World Ranking during three consecutive seasons in 2022, 2023, and 2024.

Competing at the 2023 UCI Cycling World Championships in Glasgow, the largest cycling event in history, Njemčević secured a historic 4th place in the cross-country marathon despite airline logistical failures that left her without her bike until days prior to the event.

Lejla is as well the first ever mountain bike rider from the Bosnia and Herzegovina to sign a contract with a professional cycling team. Lejla started racing at the age of 15 at local cycling club "Puls", which she continues to represent today. Throughout her career she has won 43 races organised by the Union Cycliste Internationale. Regionally and nationally, Lejla Njemčević is a 22 time National Champion in various disciplines, and has won the Balkan Championships title six times, making her the most successful Balkan rider of all time.

In August 2026, the sport documentary movie PRVA (The First) premiered at the 32nd Sarajevo Film Festival, generating high public interest, directed by Emina Daut and produced by Amar Njemčević. In production of the Radio and Television of Bosnia and Herzegovina, the film chronicles Lejla's career and journey at the Cape Epic. In recognition of her exceptional athletic achievements, Njemčević was awarded the State Award for Sport, the highest sporting honor in Bosnia and Herzegovina. Lejla is a graduated student of the Faculty of Law in Sarajevo, with a master's degree in criminal law.

== Results ==
Lejla is Bosnia and Herzegovina national champion at: cross-country (XCO), cross-country marathon (XCM), and cross-country eliminator (XCE). During her career Lejla Njemčević has won total of 19 National Championships in all discipline. In the season 2022, she has won the Marathon World Series presented by the UCI, and claim the number 1 place on the UCI Marathon ranking list. In the following year she has won the overall title of the UCI XCM World Cup, and wrote her name in cycling history of the cross country marathon discipline. The result came after she won the opening round of the UCI XCM World Cup in Nove Mesto na Morave in Czech Republic and followed by two second places in Finale Ligure, Italy and Morzine, France. On the final and fourth round of the XCM World Cup in Snowshoe, USA she won 4th place and overall World Cup title with huge point margin over the second place.

== Career ==
Lejla grew up in Sarajevo, while very young she showed passion for sport and cycling. After intense searching for a mountain bike racing club, she started training with Amar Njemčević, one of the best cycling and condition coaches in Bosnia and Herzegovina. After a few years of racing in national races, Tanović started her professional and international career in 2013. She signed a professional contract with Turkish cycling team Salcano Cappadocia in 2014. Lejla won three medals on Balkan championship races, in 2014 she was second in Macedonia and also winning second place in Greece in 2015. In 2016, she won first gold medal in elite category for Bosnia and Herzegovina on Balkan championship in Montenegro. After that victory she became most successful mountain bike rider in the history of Bosnia and Herzegovina. After season 2015 and 2016 where she was riding for Salcano, she signed for SMF Team for season 2017. In season 2017, Tanović defended her Balkan champion title in Greece. In 2018, Tanović defended her Balkan championship title in Romania. She won her fourth consecutive Balkan championship in 2019 in Serbia. She was #1 on UCI MTB Cross-country ranking.
