= Rosara Joseph =

New Zealand cyclist

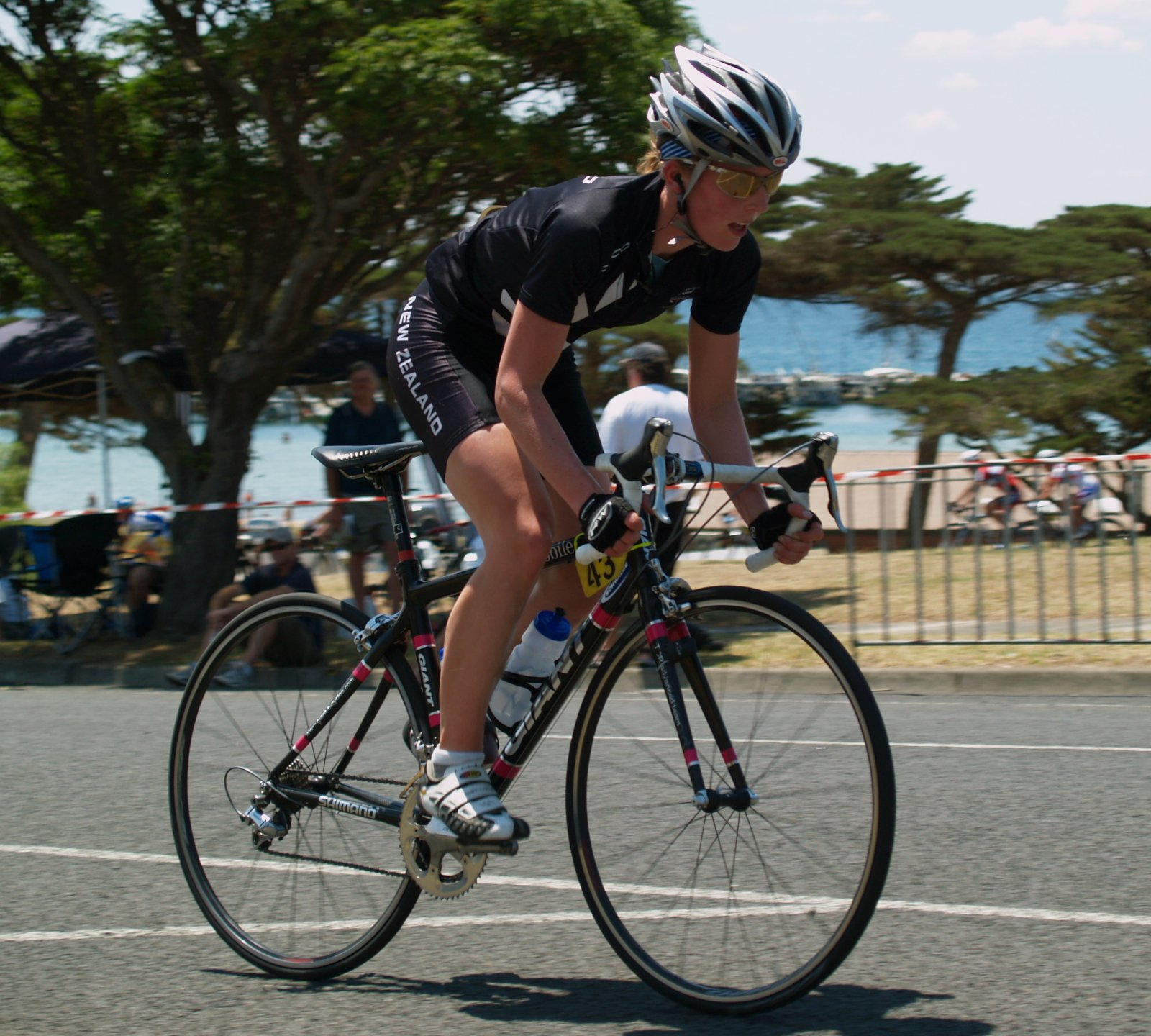
- Joseph riding a criterium for the NZ National road cycling team during the 2007 Bay Classic Series

Personal information
- Born: 21 February 1982 (age 44) Christchurch, New Zealand

Cycling career
- Sport: Cycling
- Current team: Retired
- Disciplines: Cross country road racing
- Role: Rider
Medal record
Women's mountain bike racing
Representing New Zealand
Commonwealth Games
Silver medal – second place	2006 Melbourne	Mountain bike

Rosara Joseph (born 21 February 1982, Christchurch) is a New Zealand cyclist, active between 2005 and 2012, who won a silver medal for New Zealand in the women's mountain bike racing event at the 2006 Melbourne Commonwealth Games.

She was a Rhodes Scholar at St John's College, Oxford.

== Cycling ==
Joseph began competing in mountain biking in 2005, and in 2006 she won the Oceania Cross Country Championships, held in Melbourne.

In 2006, she won silver for New Zealand in the women's mountain bike racing event at the 2006 Melbourne Commonwealth Games.

In 2007, she finished fifth in the cross country at the mountain bike world championships in Scotland.

She finished ninth in the 2008 Beijing Olympic Games in the women's cross country race.

== Education and career ==
Joseph studied law at the University of Canterbury in New Zealand and gained a Bachelor of Laws with First Class Honours in 2005, winning the university Gold Medal for top graduating law student that year.

In 2005, she was also awarded a Rhodes Scholarship to Oxford University, to study for a Bachelor of Civil Law. She graduated DPhil in 2011. Her thesis, The War Prerogative, was published by Oxford University Press in 2013.

She also clerked for two Presidents of the New Zealand’s Court of Appeal.

As of 2024, she works for the New Zealand Department of Prime Minister and Cabinet.
