= Adelheid Morath =

German cross-country mountain biker (born 1984)

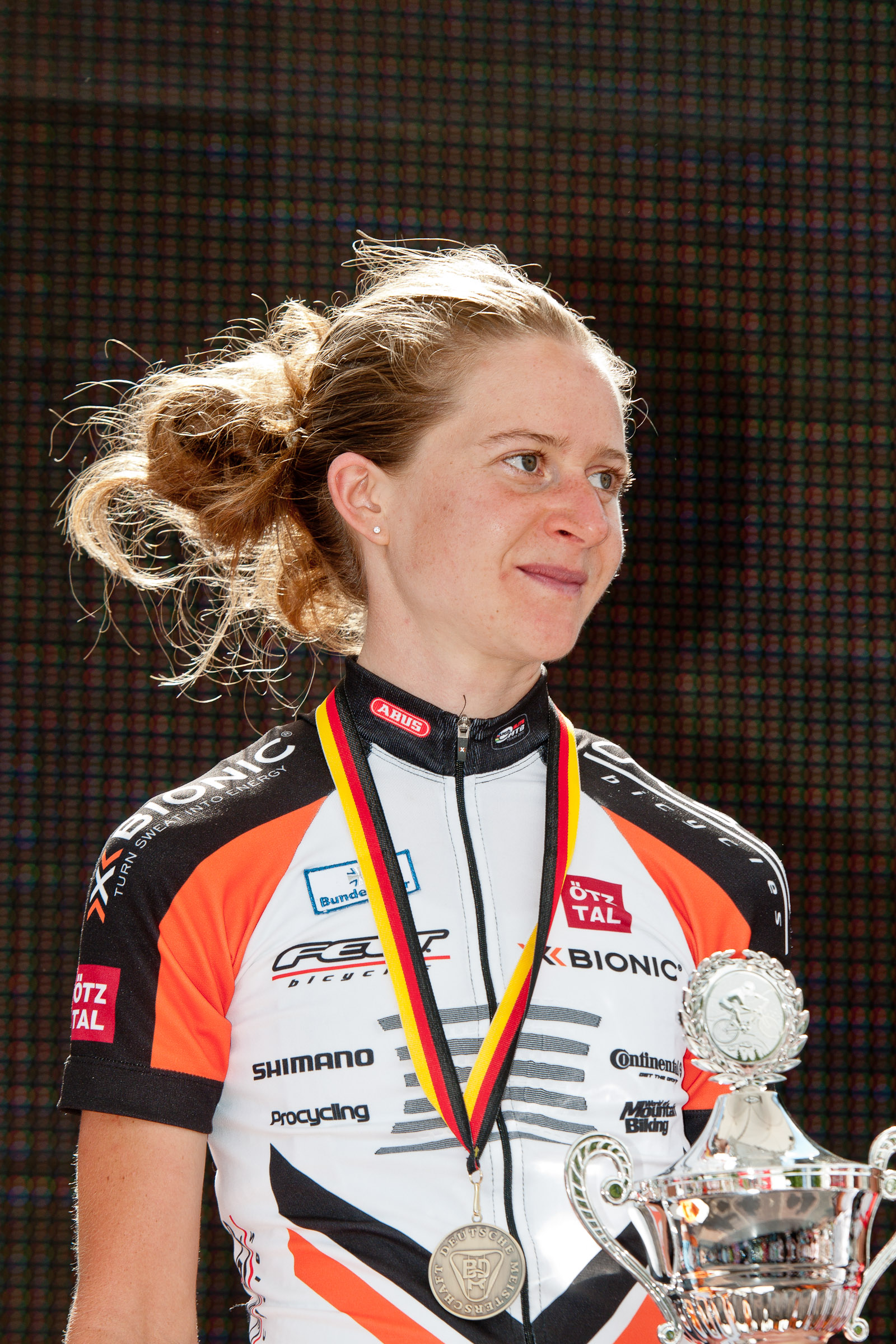
- Morath wins a bronze medal in cross-country at the 2011 German MTB Championships

Personal information
- Born: 2 August 1984 (age 42) Freiburg im Breisgau, West Germany

Cycling career
- Sport: Cycling
- Discipline: Mountain bike racing
- Role: Rider
- Rider type: Cross-country and marathon
Medal record
Representing Germany
Women's cross-country marathon
World Championships
Bronze medal – third place	2023 Glasgow	Women's

Adelheid Morath (born 2 August 1984) is a German cross-country mountain biker. At the 2012 Summer Olympics, she competed in the Women's cross-country at Hadleigh Farm, finishing in 16th place. She also competed at the 2008 Olympics, finishing 18th. She was on the start list of 2018 Cross-Country European Championships and finished 16.
