= UCI Trials World Championships =

Cycling competition

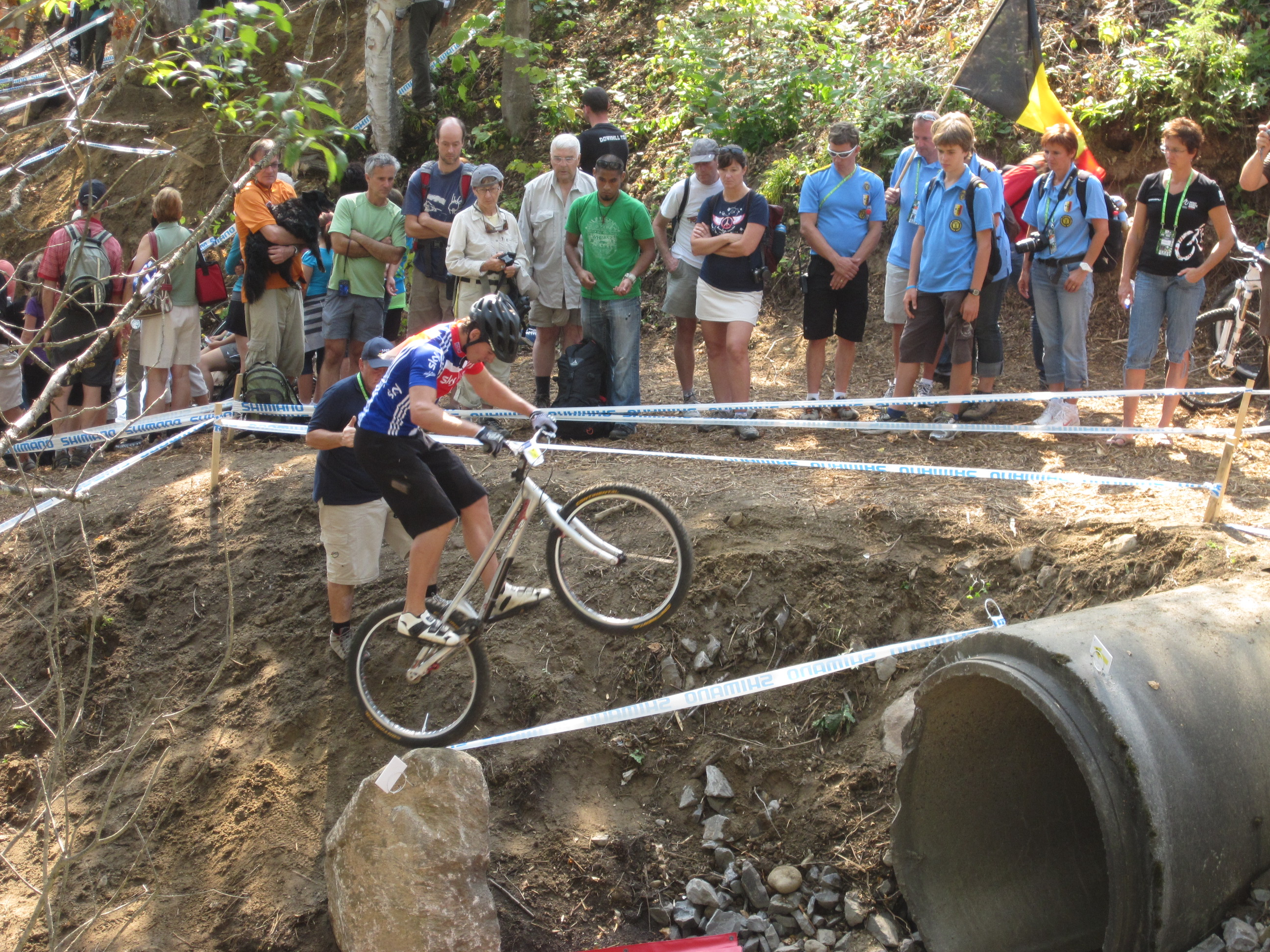
A trials rider competing in the 26-inch category of the 2010 UCI Trials World Championships in Mont-Sainte-Anne, Quebec

The UCI Trials World Championships are the world championship events in trials organised by the Union Cycliste Internationale (UCI), the governing body of world cycling. The first three finishers in each category are awarded gold, silver, and bronze medals. The winner of each category is also entitled to wear the rainbow jersey in events in that category until the following year's World Championships.

== History ==
The UCI Trials World Championships were held for the first time in 1986. Until 1999 they were held separately from the UCI World Championships in other cycling disciplines. From 2000 to 2016 they were combined with the world championships in other mountain-biking disciplines and run as the UCI Mountain Bike & Trials World Championships. Beginning in 2017, the UCI world championships in trials will be held as part of the newly created UCI Urban Cycling World Championships, which will also include the UCI world championships in freestyle BMX and cross-country eliminator.

Separate titles are awarded for men and women. The men's events include categories for junior and "elite" (an open age category) using bicycles with 20" and 26" wheels. There is also a team event, in which each country enters one junior and one elite 20" rider, one junior and one elite 26" rider, and one female rider.

From 1986 to 1994 there were no separate categories for bikes with different wheel sizes. The 20" and 26" categories were introduced in 1995. The women's category was introduced in 2001. A team event has been included since the first UCI world championships in 1986, though the format has varied over time.

== Venues ==
Year	Country	City
1986	5 events	
1987	4 events	
1988	Belgium	Limbourg
1989	Italy	Lazzate
1990	United States	Durango
1991	Switzerland	Wangen
1992	Spain	Lorca
1993	France	Val d'Isère
1994	Spain	Zafra
1995	Germany	Großheubach
1996	Switzerland	Zuoz
1997	France	Avoriaz
1998	Spain	Cartagena
1999	France	Avoriaz
2000	Spain	Sierra Nevada
2001	United States	Vail
2002	Austria	Kaprun
2003	Switzerland	Lugano

Year	Country	City
2004	France	Les Gets
2005	Italy	Livigno
2006	New Zealand	Rotorua
2007	United Kingdom	Fort William
2008	Italy	Val di Sole
2009	Australia	Canberra
2010	Canada	Mont-Sainte-Anne
2011	Switzerland	Champéry
2012	Austria	Saalfelden
2013	South Africa	Pietermaritzburg
2014	Norway	Lillehammer
2015	Andorra	Vallnord
2016	Italy	Val di Sole
2017	China	Chengdu
2018	China	Chengdu
2019	China	Chengdu
2021	Spain	Vic
2022		
2023	United Kingdom	Glasgow

== UCI Trials World Champions ==
- Men's trials, 20 inch
- Men's trials, 26 inch
- Junior men's trials, 20 inch
- Junior men's trials, 26 inch
- Women's trials
