= 2017 UCI Urban Cycling World Championships =

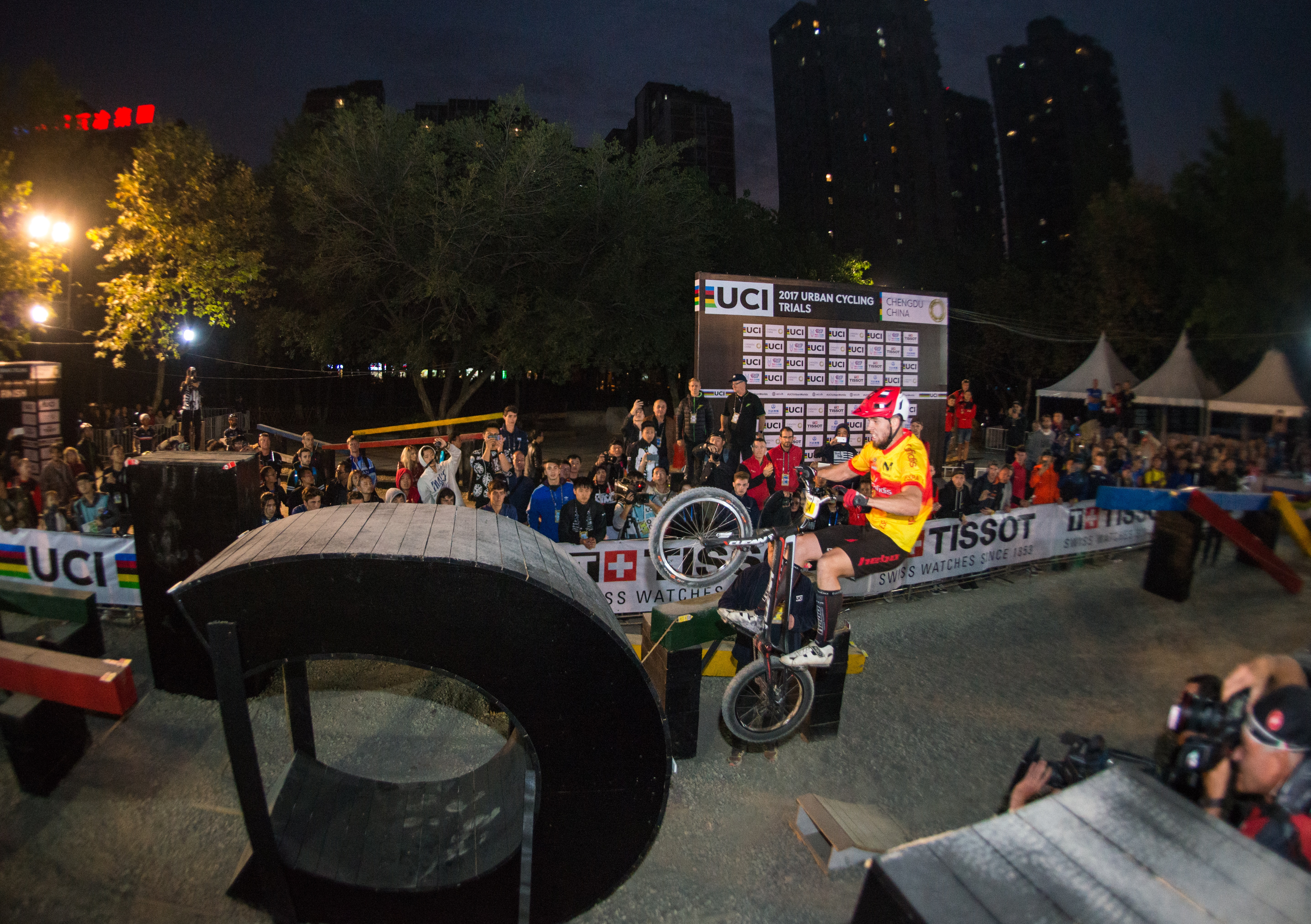
- Abel Mustieles competing in the final of the men's 20" trials competition in Chengdu
- Venue: Chengdu, China
- Date: 6 – 12 November 2017
- Events: 10

The 2017 UCI Urban Cycling World Championships was the first edition of the UCI Urban Cycling World Championships and was held from 6 to 12 November 2017 in Chengdu, China.

The event comprised the 2017 UCI World Championships in BMX freestyle, cross-country eliminator, and trials. Prior to 2017, the UCI World Championships in cross-country eliminator and trials were held as part of the UCI Mountain Bike & Trials World Championships. There were no previous UCI World Championships in BMX freestyle.

== Medal summary ==
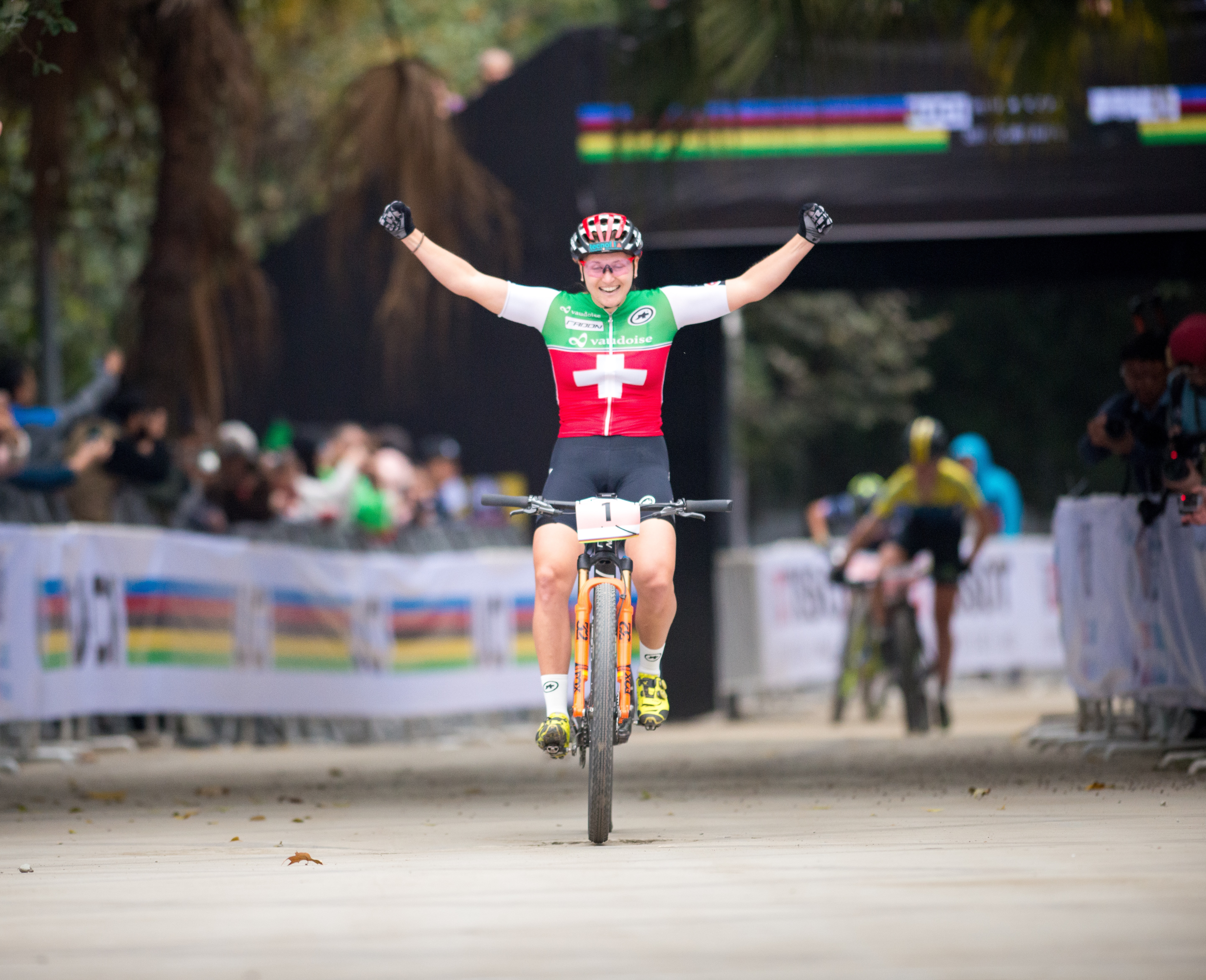
Kathrin Stirnemann wins the XCE World Championships in Chengdu

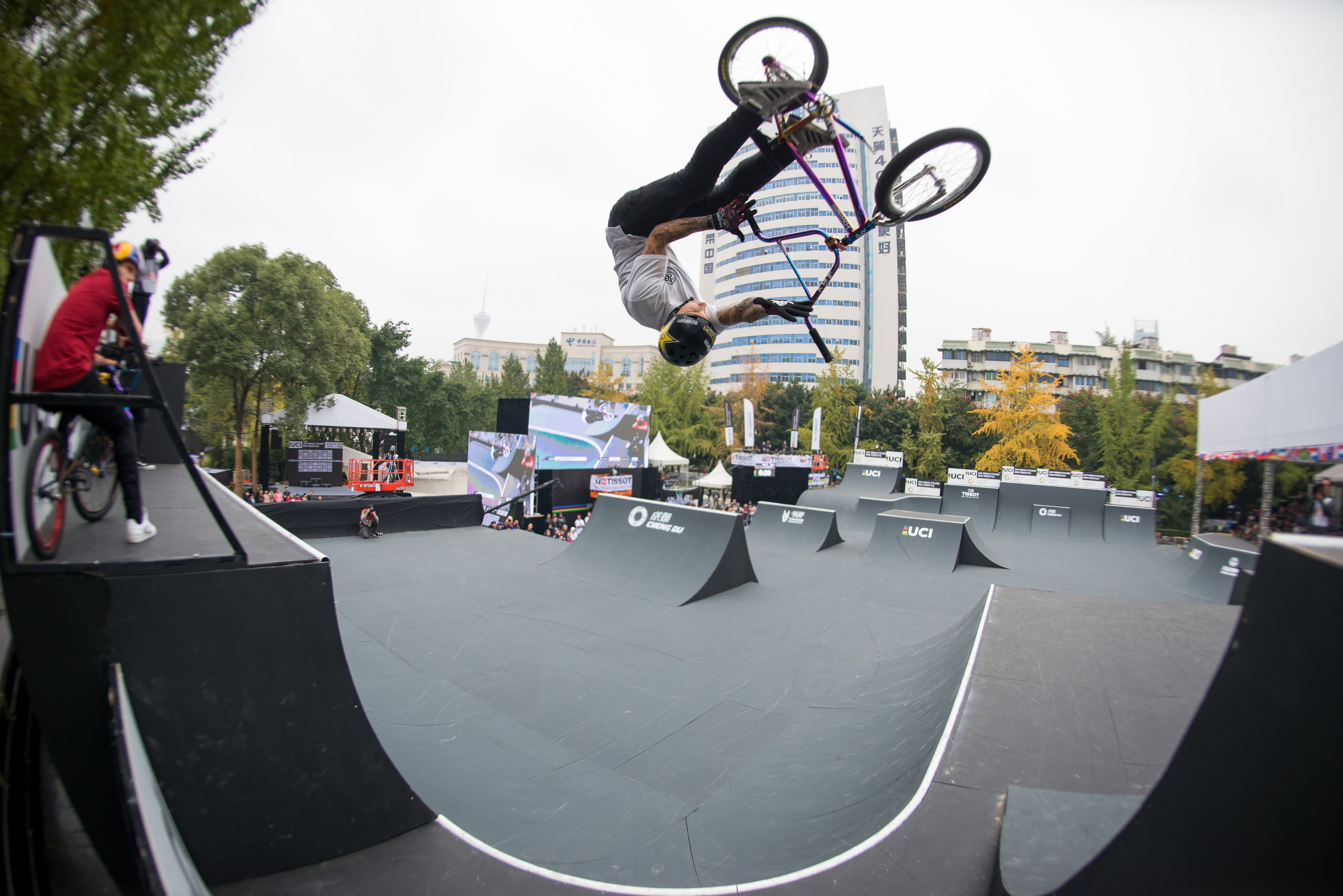
Logan Martin on his way to winning the freestyle BMX competition

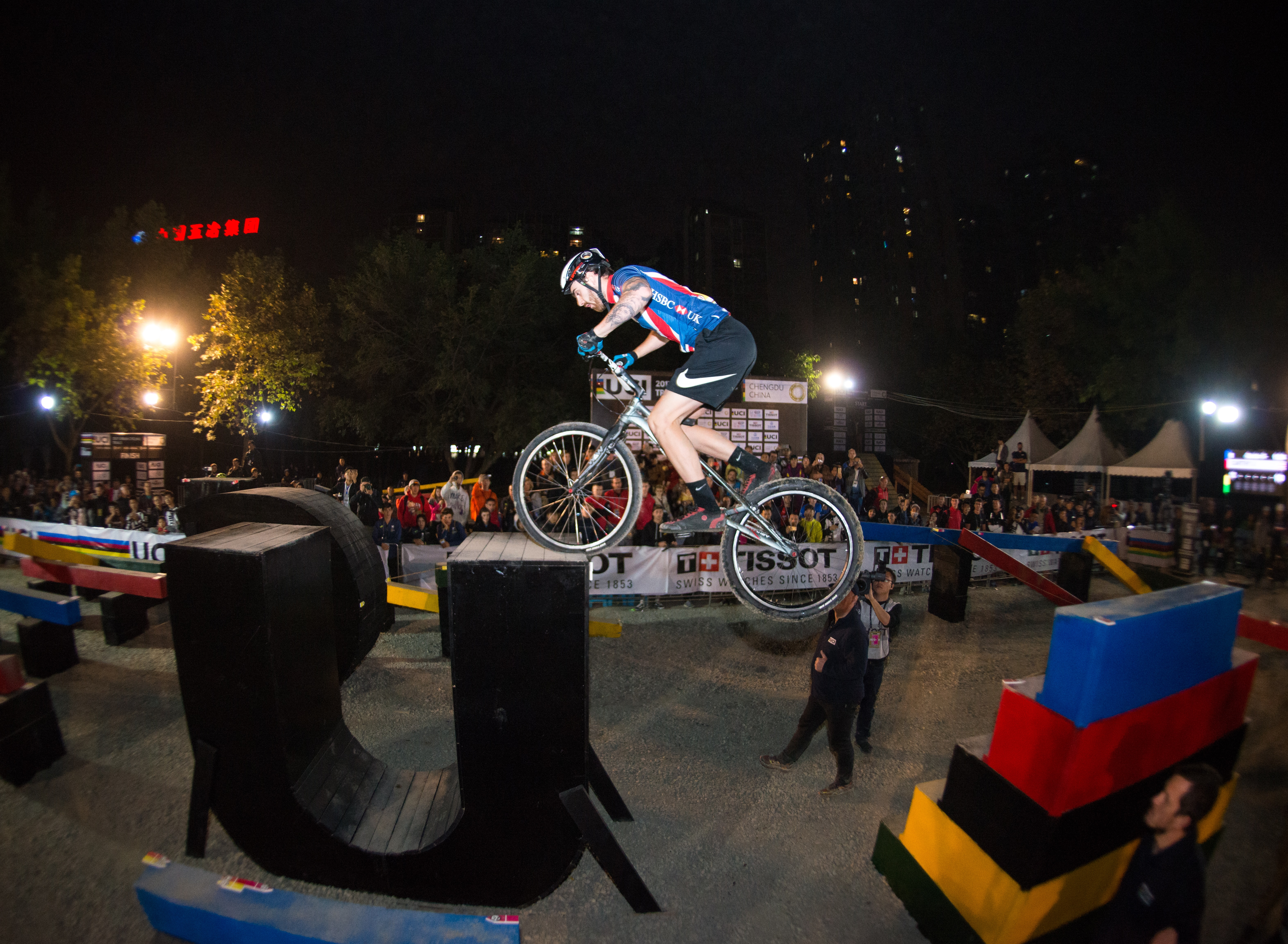
Jack Carthy competing in the final of the 26" trials competition in Chengdu

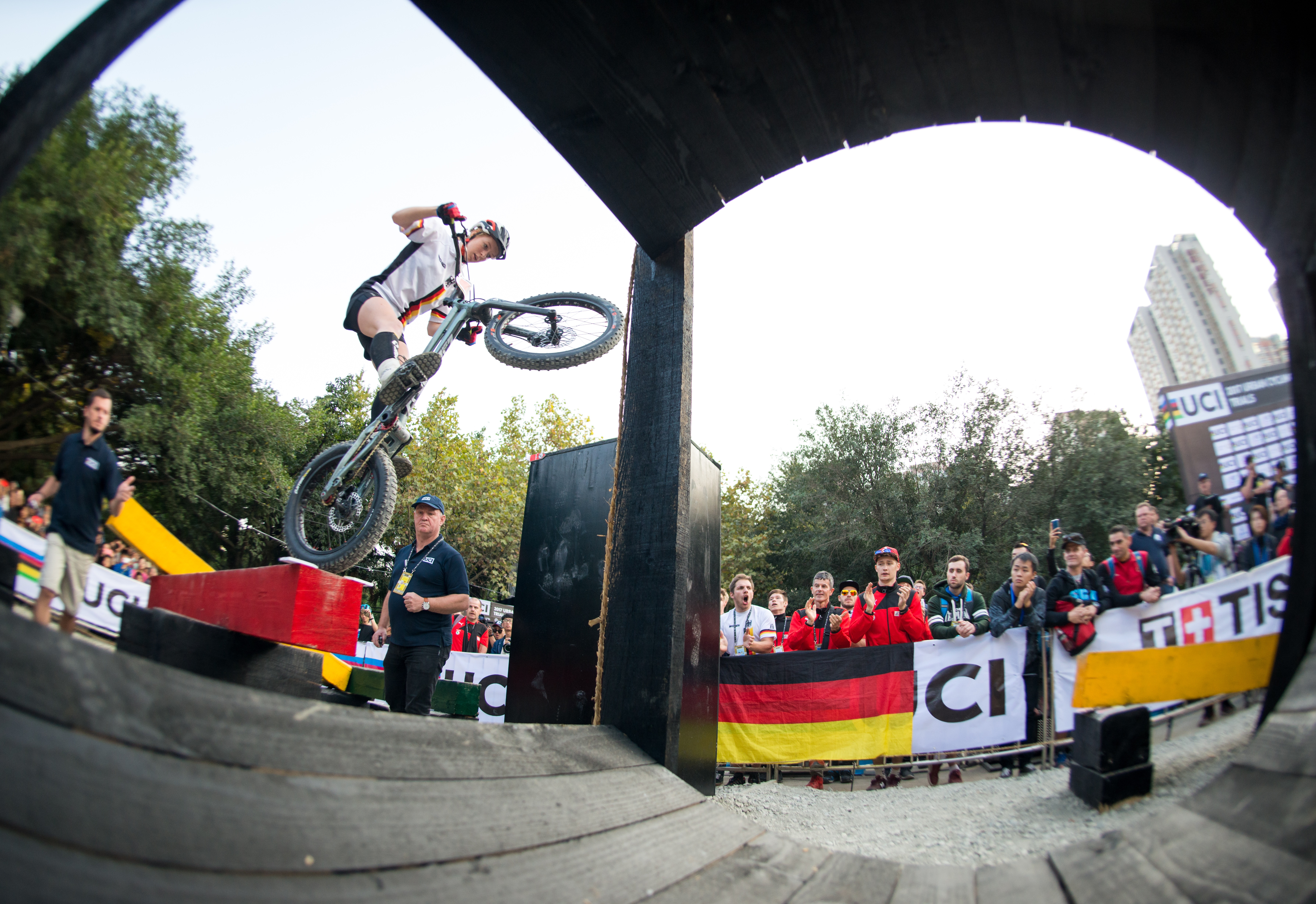
Nina Reichenbach competing in trials in Chengdu

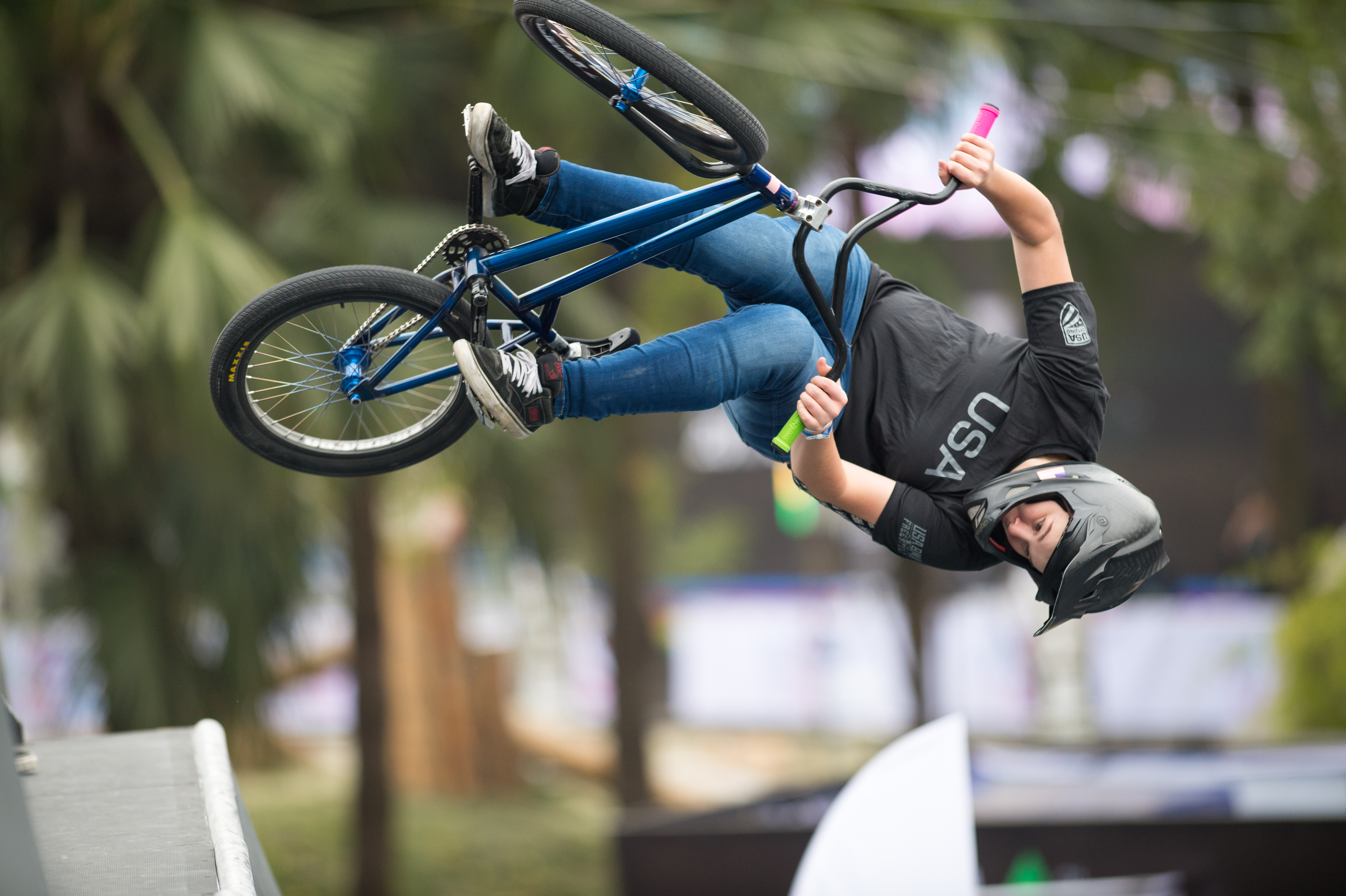
Men's BMX freestyle competition in Chengdu

=== Men's events ===
Event	Gold	Silver	Bronze
BMX freestyle	Logan Martin; Australia	Alex Coleborn; Great Britain	Colton Walker; United States
Cross-country eliminator	Titouan Perrin-Ganier; France	Simon Gegenheimer; Germany	Lorenzo Serres; France
Trials, 20 inch	Abel Mustieles; Spain	Dominik Oswald; Germany	Ion Areitio; Spain
Trials, 26 inch	Jack Carthy; Great Britain	Nicolas Vallée; France	Kenny Belaey; Belgium
Junior trials, 20 inch	Alejandro Montalvo; Spain	Louis Grillon; France	Domènec Lladó; Spain
Junior trials, 26 inch	Nathan Charra; France	Tomu Shiozaki; Japan	Noah Cardona; France

=== Women's events ===
Event	Gold	Silver	Bronze
BMX freestyle	Hannah Roberts; United States	Lara Marie Lessmann; Germany	Angie Marino; United States
Cross-country eliminator	Kathrin Stirnemann; Switzerland	Ella Holmegard; Sweden	Perrine Clauzel; France
Trials	Nina Reichenbach; Germany	Nadine Kåmark; Sweden	Irene Caminos; Spain

=== Team events ===
Event	Gold	Silver	Bronze
Trials	France; Vincent Hermance; Alex Rudeau; Louis Grillon; Noah Cardona; Manon Basseville	Germany; Raphael Zehentner; Dominik Oswald; Jonathan Sandritter; Noah Sandritter; Nina Reichenbach	Switzerland; Lucien Leiser; Tom Blaser; Romain Bellanger; Christian Siegrist; Debi Studer

== Medal table ==
Rank	Nation	Gold	Silver	Bronze	Total
1	France (FRA)	3	2	3	8
2	Spain (ESP)	2	0	3	5
3	Germany (GER)	1	4	0	5
4	Great Britain (GBR)	1	1	0	2
5	United States (USA)	1	0	2	3
6	Switzerland (SUI)	1	0	1	2
7	Australia (AUS)	1	0	0	1
8	Sweden (SWE)	0	2	0	2
9	Japan (JPN)	0	1	0	1
10	Belgium (BEL)	0	0	1	1
Totals (10 entries)		10	10	10	30

== See also ==
- 2017 UCI Mountain Bike World Championships
- 2021 UCI Urban Cycling World Championships
