= 2023 UCI Trials World Championships =

Cycling event in Glasgow, Scotland

The 2023 UCI Trials World Championships are being held in Glasgow, Scotland between 9 and 12 August 2023. Ordinarily held as part of the UCI Urban Cycling World Championships, in this year they form part of the larger 2023 UCI World Cycling Championships.

== Medal summary ==
Event	Gold	Silver	Bronze
Mixed teams	Spain; Borja Conejos; Daniel Baron; Daniel Cegarra; Victor Perez; Vera Baron	France; Robin Berchiatti; Vincent Hermance; Luka Pasturel; Louis Grillon; Nina Vabre	Great Britain; Oliver Weightman; Charlie Rolls; Adam Morewood; Elliott Cooper
Men Elite 20"	Alejandro Montalvo; Spain	Borja Conejos; Spain	Charlie Rolls; Great Britain
Men Elite 26"	Jack Carthy; Great Britain	Oliver Widmann; Germany	Marti Vayreda; Spain
Women Elite	Nina Reichenbach; Germany	Vera Baron; Spain	Alba Riera; Spain
Men Junior 20"	Oliver Weightman; Great Britain	Robin Berchiatti; France	Niilo Stenvall; Finland
Men Junior 26"	Daniel Cegarra; Spain	Luka Pasturel; France	Nicolas Ostheimer; Austria

== Medal table ==
* Host nation (Great Britain)

Rank	Nation	Gold	Silver	Bronze	Total
1	Spain	3	2	2	7
2	Great Britain*	2	0	2	4
3	Germany	1	1	0	2
4	France	0	3	0	3
5	Austria	0	0	1	1
5	Finland	0	0	1	1
Totals (6 entries)		6	6	6	18
