= UCI Trials World Championships – Men's trials, 26 inch =

Cycling competition

The men's trials, 26 inch is a trials event at the annual UCI Urban Cycling World Championships. It has been a UCI World Championship event since 1995.

From 1986 to 1999, the UCI world championships in trials were run as the UCI Trials World Championships. From 2000 to 2016, the world championships in trials were held alongside other mountain-biking disciplines as the UCI Mountain Bike & Trials World Championships. Beginning in 2017, the UCI World Championships in trials are being run as part of the UCI Urban Cycling World Championships.

The '26-inch' designation refers to the wheel diameter of the bikes that may be used in the competition. As this is a standard diameter for a mountain bike, the bikes used in 26-inch trials are also known as 'stock' bikes.

== Medalists ==
Championships	Gold	Silver	Bronze
1995 Grossheubach am Main	Thierry Girard; France	Gerd Merkel; Germany	Seliga Radek; Czech Republic
1996 Zuoz	Thierry Girard; France	Sylvain Girard; France	Gerd Merkel; Germany
1997 Avoriaz	Thierry Girard; France	Sylvain Girard; France	Bruno Arnold; France
1998 Cartagena	Bruno Arnold; France	Marc Caisso; France	Juan Francisco Sánchez; Spain
1999 Avoriaz	Marc Caisso; France	Bruno Arnold; France	Marc Vinco; France
2000 Sierra Nevada	Marc Vinco; France	Marc Caisso; France	Bruno Arnold; France
2001 Vail	Marc Caisso; France	Daniel Comas; Spain	Bruno Arnold; France
2002 Kaprun	Kenny Belaey; Belgium	Marc Vinco; France	Marc Caisso; France
2003 Lugano	Giacomo Coustellier; France	Marc Caisso; France	Kenny Belaey; Belgium
2004 Les Gets	Daniel Comas; Spain	Vincent Hermance; France	Marc Caisso; France
2005 Livigno	Kenny Belaey; Belgium	Vincent Hermance; France	Benito Ros; Spain
2006 Rotorua	Kenny Belaey; Belgium	Vincent Hermance; France	Giacomo Coustellier; France
2007 Fort William	Vincent Hermance; France	Gilles Coustellier; France	Kenny Belaey; Belgium
2008 Val di Sole	Gilles Coustellier; France	Vincent Hermance; France	Daniel Comas; Spain
2009 Canberra	Gilles Coustellier; France	Kenny Belaey; Belgium	Vincent Hermance; France
2010 Mount Sainte-Anne	Kenny Belaey; Belgium	Benito Ros; Spain	Marc Caisso; France
2011 Champéry	Gilles Coustellier; France	Kenny Belaey; Belgium	Vincent Hermance; France
2012 Leogang-Saalfelden	Gilles Coustellier; France	Aurélien Fontenoy; France	Kenny Belaey; Belgium
2013 Pietermaritzburg	Vincent Hermance; France	Gilles Coustellier; France	Kenny Belaey; Belgium
2014 Lillehammer-Hafjell	Gilles Coustellier; France	Aurélien Fontenoy; France	Kenny Belaey; Belgium
2015 Vallnord	Vincent Hermance; France	Jack Carthy; Great Britain	Kenny Belaey; Belgium
2016 Val di Sole	Jack Carthy; Great Britain	Gilles Coustellier; France	Kenny Belaey; Belgium
2017 Chengdu	Jack Carthy; Great Britain	Nicolas Vallée; France	Kenny Belaey; Belgium
2018 Chengdu	Jack Carthy; Great Britain	Sergi Llongueras; Spain	Nicolas Vallée; France
2019 Chengdu	Sergi Llongueras; Spain	Nicolas Vallée; France	Jack Carthy; Great Britain
2021 Vic	Jack Carthy; Great Britain	Julen Sáenz; Spain	Vincent Hermance; France
2022 Abu Dhabi	Jack Carthy; Great Britain	Daniel Barón; Spain	Oliver Widmann; Germany
2023 Glasgow	Jack Carthy; Great Britain	Oliver Widmann; Germany	Martí Vayreda; Spain
2024 Abu Dhabi	Jack Carthy; Great Britain	Charlie Rolls; Great Britain	Oliver Weightman; Great Britain
2025 Riyadh	Charlie Rolls; Great Britain	Julen Sáenz; Spain	Oliver Weightman; Great Britain

== Medal table ==
Rank	Nation	Gold	Silver	Bronze	Total
1	France	16	18	12	46
2	Great Britain	8	2	3	13
3	Belgium	4	2	8	14
4	Spain	2	6	4	12
5	Germany	0	2	2	4
6	Czech Republic	0	0	1	1
Totals (6 entries)		30	30	30	90
