= 2007 UCI Mountain Bike & Trials World Championships =

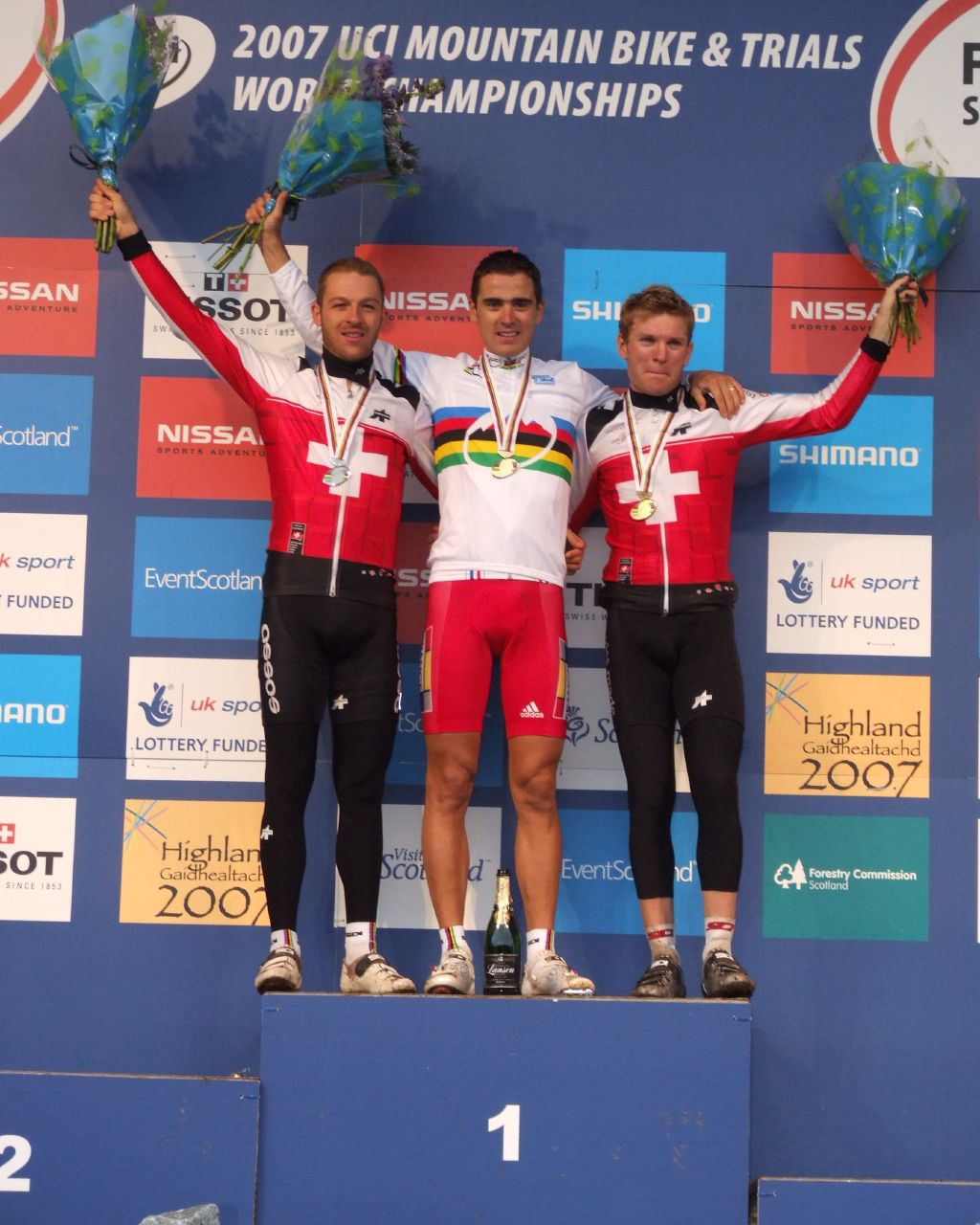
- Elite men's cross-country podium at the 2007 UCI Mountain Bike & Trials World Championships
- Venue: Fort William, United Kingdom
- Date: 4–9 September 2007
- Events: MTB: 13; Trials: 6

The 2007 UCI Mountain Bike & Trials World Championships were held in Fort William, United Kingdom from 4 to 9 September 2007. This was the first time this World Championship had been held in the United Kingdom. The Fort William site in the Scottish Highlands had been used regularly for rounds of the UCI Mountain Bike World Cup since 2002.

The disciplines included were cross-country, downhill, four-cross, and trials. The event was the 18th edition of the UCI Mountain Bike World Championships and the 22nd edition of the UCI Trials World Championships.

France finished on top of the medal table with 6 world champions and 13 medals overall, including a fourth consecutive world title for Julien Absalon in the elite men's cross country. Sam Hill and Sabrina Jonnier won their second consecutive world titles in the men's and women's elite downhill.

== Medal summary ==
=== Men's events ===
Event	Gold	Silver	Bronze
Cross-country	Julien Absalon (FRA)	Ralph Näf (SUI)	Florian Vogel (SUI)
Under 23 cross-country	Jakob Fuglsang (DEN)	Nino Schurter (SUI)	Jaroslav Kulhavý (CZE)
Junior cross-country	Thomas Litscher (SUI)	Piotr Brzozka (POL)	David Fletcher (GBR)
Downhill	Sam Hill (AUS)	Fabien Barel (FRA)	Gee Atherton (GBR)
Junior downhill	Ruaridh Cunningham (GBR)	John Swanguen (USA)	Matthew Scoles (NZL)
Four-cross	Brian Lopes (USA)	Romain Saladini (FRA)	Jurg Meijer (NED)
Trials, 20 inch	Benito Ros Charral (ESP)	Carles Diaz Codina (ESP)	Daniel Comas Riera (ESP)
Trials, 26 inch	Vincent Hermance (FRA)	Gilles Coustellier (FRA)	Kenny Belaey (BEL)
Junior trials, 20 inch	Aurélien Fontenoy (FRA)	Eduard Planas Nuñez (ESP)	Kevin Aglae (FRA)
Junior trials, 26 inch	Aurélien Fontenoy (FRA)	Loris Braun (SUI)	Hannes Herrmann (GER)

=== Women's events ===
Event	Gold	Silver	Bronze
Cross-country	Irina Kalentieva (RUS)	Sabine Spitz (GER)	Jingjing Wang (CHN)
Under 23 cross-country	Liu Ying (CHN)	Chengyuan Ren (CHN)	Elisabeth Osl (AUT)
Junior cross-country	Alla Boyko (UKR)	Jitka Skarnitzlova (CZE)	Julie Bresset (FRA)
Downhill	Sabrina Jonnier (FRA)	Rachel Atherton (GBR)	Tracey Hannah (AUS)
Junior downhill	Floriane Pugin (FRA)	Katy Curd (GBR)	Myriam Nicole (FRA)
Four-cross	Jill Kintner (USA)	Anneke Beerten (NED)	Melissa Buhl (USA)
Trials	Karin Moor (SUI)	Gemma Abant Condal (ESP)	Mireia Abant Condal (ESP)

=== Team events ===
Event	Gold	Silver	Bronze
Cross-country	Switzerland: Florian Vogel; Thomas Litscher; Petra Henzi; Nino Schurter	Poland: Marcin Karczyński; Piotr Brzózka; Maja Włoszczowska; Dariusz Batek	United States: Georgia Gould; Ethan Gilmour; Samuel Schultz; Adam Craig
Trials	Spain: Benito Ros Charral; Eduard Planas Nuñez; Daniel Comas Riera; Andreu Miro Molins; Mireia Abant Condal	France: Marc Caisso; Kevin Aglae; Vincent Hermance; Aurélien Fontenoy; Julie Pesenti	Germany: Sebastian Hoffmann; Julian Peter; Thomas Mrohs; Hannes Herrmann; Elisa Brieden

=== Medal table ===
Rank	Nation	Gold	Silver	Bronze	Total
1	France (FRA)	6	4	3	13
2	Switzerland (SUI)	3	3	1	7
3	Spain (ESP)	2	3	2	7
4	United States (USA)	2	1	2	5
5	Great Britain (GBR)	1	2	2	5
6	China (CHN)	1	1	1	3
7	Australia (AUS)	1	0	1	2
8	Denmark (DEN)	1	0	0	1
8	Russia (RUS)	1	0	0	1
8	Ukraine (UKR)	1	0	0	1
11	Poland (POL)	0	2	0	2
12	Germany (GER)	0	1	2	3
13	Czech Republic (CZE)	0	1	1	2
13	Netherlands (NED)	0	1	1	2
15	Austria (AUT)	0	0	1	1
15	Belgium (BEL)	0	0	1	1
15	New Zealand (NZL)	0	0	1	1
Totals (17 entries)		19	19	19	57

== See also ==
- UCI Mountain Bike Marathon World Championships
