= 2006 UCI Mountain Bike & Trials World Championships =

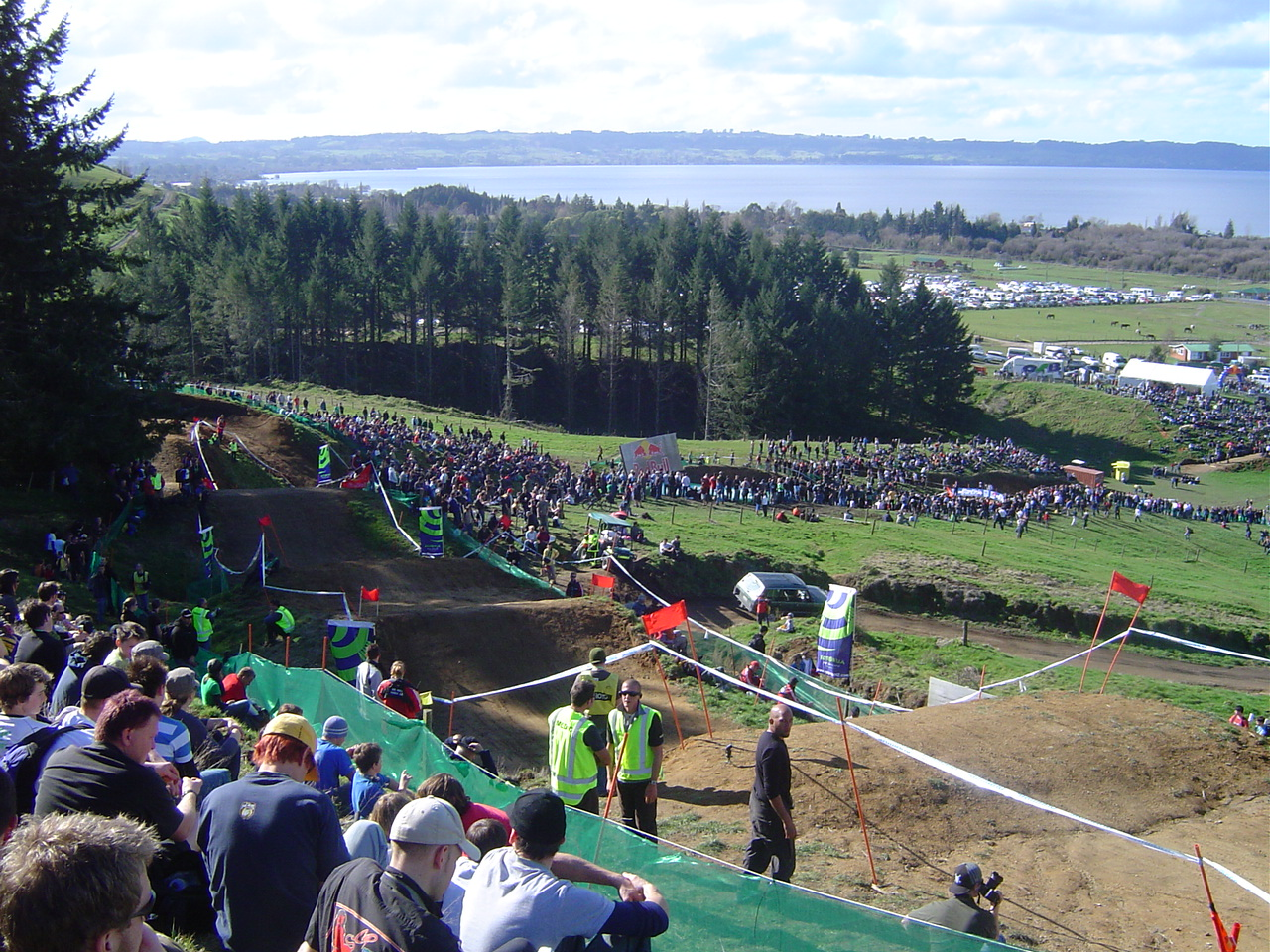
- Venue: Rotorua, New Zealand
- Date(s): 22–27 August 2006
- Events: MTB: 13; Trials: 6

The 2006 UCI Mountain Bike & Trials World Championships were held in Rotorua, New Zealand, from 22 to 27 August 2006. The disciplines included were cross-country, downhill, four-cross, and trials. The event was the 17th edition of the UCI Mountain Bike World Championships and the 21st edition of the UCI Trials World Championships.

This was the first UCI Mountain Bike & Trials World Championships held in New Zealand and the second held in Oceania after the 1996 World Championships in Cairns, Australia.

A women's under-23 race was included in the UCI Mountain Bike & Trials World Championships for the first time in 2006 and was won by Ren Chengyuan from China. Julien Absalon of France and Gunn-Rita Dahle Flesjå of Norway each won their third consecutive elite cross-country world titles. Sam Hill became the first Australian to win the elite men's downhill world title.

== Medal summary ==
=== Men's events ===
Event	Gold	Silver	Bronze
Cross-country	Julien Absalon (FRA)	Christoph Sauser (SUI)	Fredrik Kessiakoff (SWE)
Under 23 cross-country	Nino Schurter (SUI)	Tony Longo (ITA)	Max Plaxton (CAN)
Junior cross-country	Mathias Flückiger (SUI)	Martin Fanger (SUI)	Pascal Meyer (SUI)
Downhill	Sam Hill (AUS)	Greg Minnaar (RSA)	Nathan Rennie (AUS)
Junior downhill	Cameron Cole (NZL)	Samuel Blenkinsop (NZL)	Antoine Badouard (FRA)
Four-cross	Michal Prokop (CZE)	Roger Rinderknecht (SUI)	Guido Tschugg (GER)
Trials, 20 inch	Marco Hösel (GER)	Carles Diaz Codina (ESP)	Benito Ros Charral (ESP)
Trials, 26 inch	Kenny Belaey (BEL)	Vincent Hermance (FRA)	Gilles Coustellier (FRA)
Junior trials, 20 inch	Marco Thomä (GER)	Aurélien Fontenoy (FRA)	Matthias Mrohs (GER)
Junior trials, 26 inch	Aurélien Fontenoy (FRA)	Ben Slinger (GBR)	Matthias Mrohs (GER)

=== Women's events ===
Event	Gold	Silver	Bronze
Cross-country	Gunn-Rita Dahle Flesjå (NOR)	Irina Kalentieva (RUS)	Marie-Helene Premont (CAN)
Under 23 cross-country	Ren Chengyuan (CHN)	Liu Ying (CHN)	Sarah Koba (SUI)
Junior cross-country	Tanja Žakelj (SLO)	Julie Krasniak (FRA)	Nadja Roschi (SUI)
Downhill	Sabrina Jonnier (FRA)	Tracy Moseley (GBR)	Rachel Atherton (GBR)
Junior downhill	Tracey Hannah (AUS)	Floriane Pugin (FRA)	Micayla Gatto (CAN)
Four-cross	Jill Kintner (USA)	Anneke Beerten (NED)	Anita Molcik (AUT)
Trials	Karin Moor (SUI)	Mireia Abant Condal (ESP)	Gemma Abant Condal (ESP)

=== Team events ===
Event	Gold	Silver	Bronze
Cross-country	Switzerland; Florian Vogel; Martin Fanger; Petra Henzi; Nino Schurter	Italy; Tony Longo; Cristian Cominelli; Eva Lechner; Jader Zoli	Poland; Marcin Karczynski; Adrian Dzialakiewicz; Maja Włoszczowska; Kryspin Pyrgies
Trials	France	Germany	Spain

=== Medal table ===
Rank	Nation	Gold	Silver	Bronze	Total
1	France (FRA)	4	4	2	10
2	Switzerland (SUI)	4	3	3	10
3	Germany (GER)	2	1	3	6
4	Australia (AUS)	2	0	1	3
5	China (CHN)	1	1	0	2
5	New Zealand (NZL)	1	1	0	2
7	Belgium (BEL)	1	0	0	1
7	Czech Republic (CZE)	1	0	0	1
7	Norway (NOR)	1	0	0	1
7	Slovenia (SLO)	1	0	0	1
7	United States (USA)	1	0	0	1
12	Spain (ESP)	0	2	3	5
13	Great Britain (GBR)	0	2	1	3
14	Italy (ITA)	0	2	0	2
15	Netherlands (NED)	0	1	0	1
15	Russia (RUS)	0	1	0	1
15	South Africa (RSA)	0	1	0	1
18	Canada (CAN)	0	0	3	3
19	Austria (AUT)	0	0	1	1
19	Poland (POL)	0	0	1	1
19	Sweden (SWE)	0	0	1	1
Totals (21 entries)		19	19	19	57

== See also ==
- 2006 UCI Mountain Bike World Cup
- UCI Mountain Bike Marathon World Championships
