= UCI Trials World Championships – Junior men's trials, 20 inch =

The junior men's trials, 20 inch is a trials event at the annual UCI Urban Cycling World Championships. It has been a UCI World Championship event since 1986. From 1986 to 1994 there was no separate 26-inch junior category in the world championships.

From 1986 to 1999, the UCI world championships in trials were run as the UCI Trials World Championships. From 2000 to 2016, the world championships in trials were held alongside other mountain-biking disciplines as the UCI Mountain Bike & Trials World Championships. Beginning in 2017, the UCI trials world championships will be run as part of the UCI Urban Cycling World Championships.

== Medalists ==
Championships	Gold	Silver	Bronze
1986	Daniel del Valle; Spain	Josep Ribera; Spain	Juan Expósito; Spain
1987	Ot Pi; Spain	Josep Ribera; Spain	Paolo Marques; Germany
1988	Juan Franco Sánchez; Spain	Gerd Merkel; Germany	Horst Shmid; Germany
1989	(not awarded)	(not awarded)	(not awarded)
1990	Petr Hynčica; Czechoslovakia	Pavel Karkos; Czechoslovakia	Libor Karas; Czechoslovakia
1991	Milos Pospíšil; Czechoslovakia	Martin Šimůnek; Czechoslovakia	Bruno Fracassi; Belgium
1992 Lorca	Gabriel Villada; Spain	Pere Esteve; Spain	Juan Moreno; Spain
1993 Val d'Isère	Jesús Hurtado; Spain	Mikel Iñorbe; Spain	Dani Parramón; Spain
1994 Zafra	Elias Bonet; Spain	Iñigo Calleja; Spain	Dani Parramón; Spain
1995 Grossheubach am Main	Daniel Cegarra; Spain	Dave Rollier; Switzerland	Juan Franco Sánchez; Spain
1996 Zuoz	Marc Vinco; France	Christian Weber; Germany	Juan Pedro García; Spain
1997 Avoriaz	Christian Weber; Germany	Marco Hösel; Germany	Gilles Borrel; France
1998 Cartagena	Marco Hösel; Germany	Rafał Kumorowski; Poland	Benito Ros; Spain
1999 Avoriaz	Marc Amory Buteneers; Belgium	Kenny Belaey; Belgium	Rafał Kumorowski; Poland
2000 Sierra Nevada	Kenny Belaey; Belgium	Simon Billmaier; Germany	Michael Hampel; Germany
2001 Vail	Kenny Belaey; Belgium	Simon Billmaier; Germany	Stefan Moor; Switzerland
2002 Kaprun	Gilles Coustellier; France	Diego Barrio; Spain	Giacomo Coustellier; France
2003 Lugano	Diego Barrio; Spain	Gilles Coustellier; France	Rémy Morgan; France
2004 Les Gets	James Hyland; Great Britain	Ben Savage; Great Britain	Rafał Felix Heller; Germany
2005 Livigno	Ben Slinger; Great Britain	Marco Thomä; Germany	Karol Serwin; Poland
2006 Rotorua	Marco Thomä; Germany	Aurélien Fontenoy; France	Mattihas Mrohs; Germany
2007 Fort William	Aurélien Fontenoy; France	Eduard Planas; Spain	Kevin Aglae; France
2008 Val di Sole	Abel Mustieles; Spain	Loris Braun; Switzerland	Jamis Burton; Canada
2009 Canberra	Abel Mustieles; Spain	Ion Areitio; Spain	Roderique Timellini; Belgium
2010 Mont-Sainte-Anne	Ion Areitio; Spain	Raphael Pils; Germany	Marius Merger; France
2011 Champery	Raphael Pils; Germany	Marius Merger; France	David Hoffman; Germany
2012 Leogang-Saalfelden	Raphael Pils; Germany	Maxime Muffat; France	Lucien Leiser; Switzerland
2013 Pietermaritzburg	Bernat Seuba; Spain	Thomas Pechhacker; Austria	Alex Rudeau; France
2014 Lillehammer-Hafjell	Dominik Oswald; Germany	Oriol Roca; Spain	Alex Rudeau; France
2015 Vallnord	Dominik Oswald; Germany	Sebastián Ruiz; Spain	Johan Buchwalder; Switzerland
2016 Val di Sole	Eloi Palau; Spain	Nicolas Vallée; France	Samuel Hlavatý; Slovakia
2017 Chengdu	Alejandro Montalvo; Spain	Louis Grillon; France	Domènec Lladó; Spain
2018 Chengdu	Alejandro Montalvo; Spain	Charlie Rolls; Great Britain	Martí Arán; Spain
2019 Chengdu	Charlie Rolls; Great Britain	Toni Guillén; Spain	Antonio Fraile; Spain
2020	(not awarded)	(not awarded)	(not awarded)
2021 Vic	Martí Riera; Spain	Loris Gonzalez; Switzerland	Nil Benítez; Spain
2022 Abu Dhabi	Robin Berchiatti; France	Nil Benítez; Spain	Niilo Stenvall; Finland
2023 Glasgow	Oliver Weightman; Great Britain	Robin Berchiatti; France	Niilo Stenvall; Finland
2024 Abu Dhabi	Travis Asenjo; Spain	Guillaume Camus; France	Víctor Pérez; Spain
2025 Riyadh	Travis Asenjo; Spain	Ugo Theunissen; Belgium	Louis Chasseuil; France

== Medal table ==
Rank	Nation	Gold	Silver	Bronze	Total
1	Spain	17	12	12	41
2	Germany	7	7	6	20
3	France	4	8	8	20
4	Great Britain	4	2	0	6
5	Belgium	3	2	2	7
6	Czechoslovakia	2	2	1	5
7	Switzerland	0	2	3	5
8	Poland	0	1	2	3
9	Austria	0	1	0	1
10	Finland	0	0	2	2
11	Slovakia	0	0	1	1
Totals (11 entries)		37	37	37	111
