= Anne-Caroline Chausson =

French cyclist (born 1977)

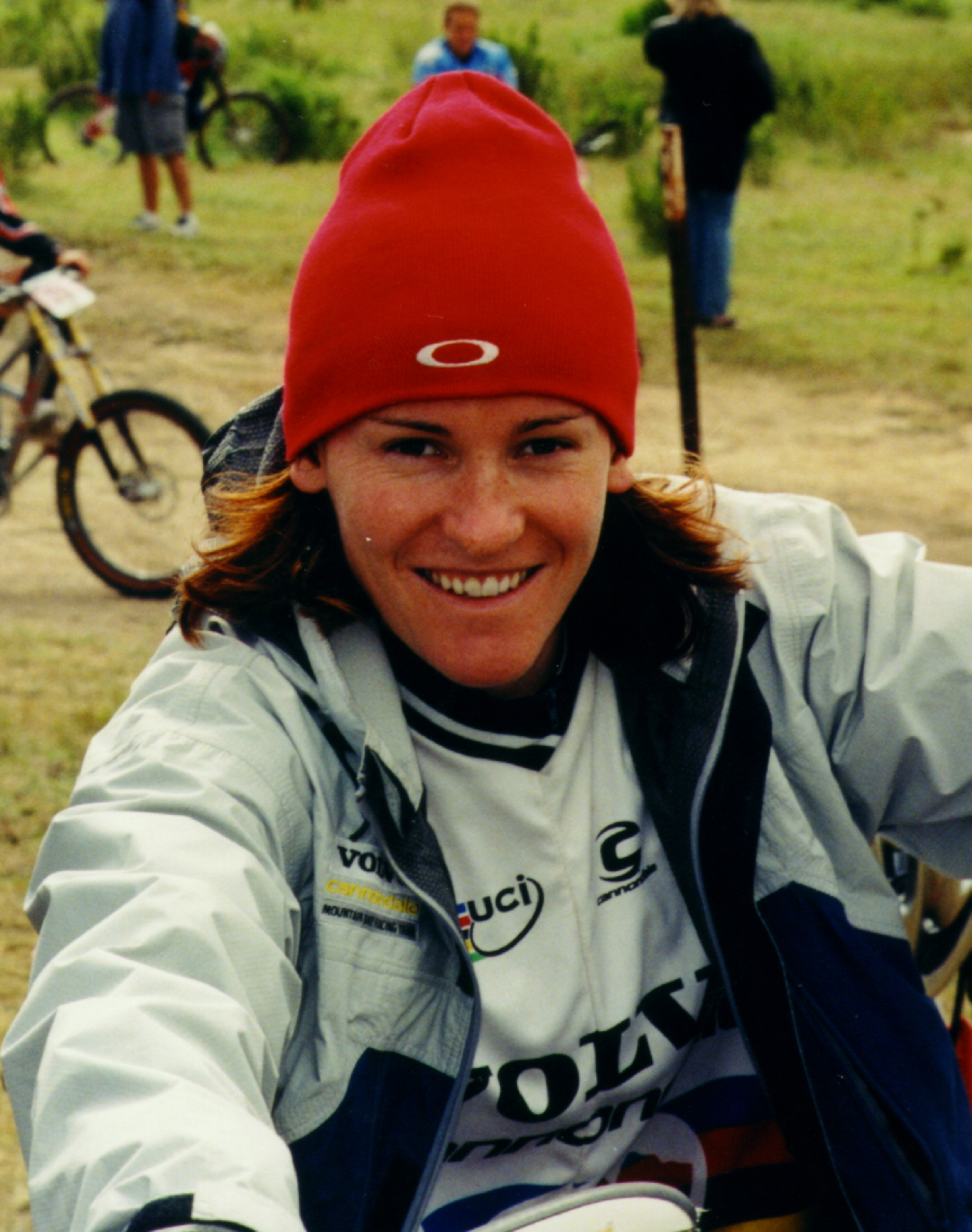
- Chausson at the 2001 Sea Otter Classic

Personal information
- Full name: Anne-Caroline Chausson
- Born: 8 October 1977 (age 49) Dijon, France
- Height: 1.73 m (5 ft 8 in)
- Weight: 64 kg (141 lb)

Cycling career
- Sport: Cycling
- Current team: Team Commencal Vallnord
- Disciplines: Mountain bike BMX
- Role: Racer/ Ambassador
- Rider type: Off-road
Medal record
Representing France
Women's BMX racing
Olympic Games
Gold medal – first place	2008 Beijing	BMX racing
World Championships
Silver medal – second place	2008 Taiyuan	BMX racing
Women's Mountain bike racing
World Championships
Gold medal – first place	1993 Métabief	Junior downhill
Gold medal – first place	1994 Vail	Junior downhill
Gold medal – first place	1995 Kirchzarten	Junior downhill
Gold medal – first place	1996 Cairns	Downhill
Gold medal – first place	1997 Château-d'Œx	Downhill
Gold medal – first place	1998 Mont Sainte-Anne	Downhill
Gold medal – first place	1999 Åre	Downhill
Gold medal – first place	2000 Sierra Nevada ESP	Downhill
Gold medal – first place	2000 Sierra Nevada	Dual
Gold medal – first place	2001 Vail	Downhill
Gold medal – first place	2001 Vail	Dual
Gold medal – first place	2002 Kaprun	Downhill
Gold medal – first place	2002 Kaprun	Four-cross
Gold medal – first place	2003 Lugano	Downhill
Gold medal – first place	2003 Lugano	Four-cross
Gold medal – first place	2005 Livigno	Downhill

Anne-Caroline Chausson (born 8 October 1977 in Dijon) is a French professional cyclist who competes in bicycle enduro, bicycle motocross (BMX), downhill time trial and cross-country mass start, dual, and four-cross mountain bicycle racing. She is best known for having won thirteen Union Cycliste Internationale senior mountain bike world championship rainbow jerseys, fourteen European mountain bike championships, and five consecutive Mountain Bike World Cup downhill series (1998–2002). She was nominated for the 2003 Laureus World Sports Awards Alternative Sportsperson of the Year. At the 2008 Summer Olympics in Beijing, Chausson competed for France in the inaugural women's BMX event, winning the gold medal.

== Career highlights ==
Born in Dijon, Chausson capitalized on her previously successful BMX racing career that ended in 1993. Winning the 1993 downhill junior world championship gold medal started her international successful career. She enjoyed quick success early in her mountain bike racing career and won 1994 still being a Junior her first World Cup race in Cap d'Ail/FRA. Her amazing skills under different weather and track conditions were proofed after finishing 2nd in a muddy and at start level snow-covered Hindelang/GER World Cup. Also Silverstar the same year she was 2nd and this summed up to a solid 2nd overall. 1994, and 1995 two more downhill junior world championship gold medals before matriculating to the senior circuit. Her 1995 win in Kirchzarten had a bitter taste to her. She asked to ride Elite, but got no permission. Her race time then was faster to the time of the Elite Champion Leigh Donovan. Very emotional at the prize giving she refused to pull over the Junior Champions jersey. In Elite she could win the downhill title in eight consecutive years. Chausson has also been regarded to be the world's greatest downhiller of all time. In 1996, when she finished second behind American Missy Giove for the overall World Cup title, Chausson captured the World Champions title, defeating silver medallist American Leigh Donovan and Giove, who would claim the bronze. Chausson would once more finish second to Giove in the 1997 World Cup overall standings but easily claimed that year's world championship, defeating Swiss Marielle Saner and Finn Katja Repo.

In 1998, Chausson finally overcame Giove, with whom she would battle for nearly a decade, to win the World Cup title and subsequently won the world championship over World Cup bronze medallist Nolvenn LeCaer; she would repeat her double in 1999 and 2000, each time topping Giove for the World Cup title and Repo for the world championship.

In 2000, Chausson expanded her competitive repertoire, participating in the duals event, in which riders compete on parallel courses, composed of identical obstacles—primarily jumps and berms—in a single-elimination tournament, during the third season in which it was contested at the World Cup level, after which the 2000 iteration of the world championships featured the event for the first time; Chausson captured each crown, ahead each time of American Tara Llanes. Chausson once more participated in the duals event in 2001, failing to win a medal in the World Cup, won by Donovan, but winning the world championship once more, garnering the second and last duals title, this over Australian Katrina Miller, the World Cup silver medallist.

The four-cross BMX racing-inspired event, in which four cyclists ride on the same course betwixt gates, such that only the top finisher advances to a subsequent round, was chosen in 2001 by the National Off-Road Bicycle Association, the sports authority governing mountain biking for USA Cycling, to replace the duals and duals-slalom events and replaced the duals event in 2002 in both the World Cup and world championships competitions; Chausson nevertheless won the four-cross and downhill titles in each, ahead of countrymate Sabrina Jonnier in each, save for in the four-cross event at the world championships, where she topped Miller.

In 2007, she resumed BMX racing in pursuit of an Olympic medal in BMX racing which was making its debut in the 2008 Summer Olympic Games. This effort was successful when she won the gold medal in Women's BMX. Since the women's medal round was staged before the men's, she became the first person to win a gold medal in that sport.

After this she returned to mountain biking to focus on enduro racing. In 2012, she won the seven-day-long Trans-Provence Enduro Race.

Anne Caroline Chausson is recovering well from her second bout of cancer. Three months after her surgery, and after finishing a course of tomotherapy (radiotherapy), she's back out riding bikes again.

== BMX Olympic champion ==
Chausson was chosen to represent France in the inaugural women's BMX event at the 2008 Summer Olympics in Beijing, with Laëtitia Le Corguillé. She became the first ever Olympic gold medal winner in BMX racing after winning the one-round final, while Le Corguillé took the silver medal after British rider Shanaze Reade clipped Chausson's rear wheel and fell in the final turn.

== Titles ==
BMX

- BMX Olympic Champion: 2008

Mountain biking

- Junior downhill World Champion: 1993, 1994, 1995
- Senior downhill World Champion: 1996, 1997, 1998, 1999, 2000, 2001, 2002, 2003, 2005
- Senior dual slalom World Champion: 2000, 2001
- Senior four-cross World Champion: 2002, 2003
- World Cup downhill series winner: 1998, 1999, 2000, 2001, 2002
- World Cup dual slalom series winner: 2000
- World Cup four-cross series winner: 2002
