= UCI Mountain Bike & Trials World Championships – Women's dual =

The women's dual was an event at the annual UCI Mountain Bike & Trials World Championships. It was held between 2000 and 2001, being replaced by the four-cross event in 2002. Anne-Caroline Chausson of France was the most successful rider with two gold medals.

== Medalists ==
Championships	Gold	Silver	Bronze
2000 Sierra Nevada	Anne-Caroline Chausson; France	Tara Llanes; United States	Sabrina Jonnier; France
2001 Vail	Anne-Caroline Chausson; France	Katrina Miller; Australia	Tara Llanes; United States
