= 2013 UCI Mountain Bike & Trials World Championships =

Mountain bike competition

- Venue: Pietermaritzburg, South Africa
- Date: 26 August – 1 September 2013
- Events: 21 (15 mountain bike and 6 trials)

The 2013 UCI Mountain Bike & Trials World Championships was the 24th edition of the UCI Mountain Bike & Trials World Championships, and was held in Pietermaritzburg, South Africa (Trials, Downhill, Cross-country Eliminator, and Olympic Cross-country events) and Leogang, Austria (Four-cross events).

== Medal summary ==
=== Men's events ===
Event	Gold	Silver	Bronze
Cross-country	Nino Schurter; Switzerland	Manuel Fumic; Germany	José Antonio Hermida; Spain
Under 23 cross-country	Gerhard Kerschbaumer; Italy	Julian Schelb; Germany	Michiel van der Heijden; Netherlands
Junior cross-country	Lukas Baum; Germany	Peter Disera; Canada	Gioele Bertolini; Italy
Cross-country eliminator	Paul van der Ploeg; Australia	Daniel Federspiel; Austria	Catriel Soto; Argentina
Downhill	Greg Minnaar; South Africa	Michael Hannah; Australia	Jared Graves; Australia
Junior downhill	Richard Rude Jr; United States	Loris Vergier; France	Michael Jones; Great Britain
Four-cross	Joost Wichman; Netherlands	Michael Měchura; Czech Republic	Quentin Derbier; France
Trials, 20 inch	Abel Mustieles; Spain	Aurélien Fontenoy; France	Benito Ros; Spain
Trials, 26 inch	Vincent Hermance; France	Gilles Coustellier; France	Kenny Belaey; Belgium
Junior trials, 20 inch	Bernat Seuba; Spain	Thomas Pechhacker; Austria	Alex Rudeau; France
Junior trials, 26 inch	Jack Carthy; Great Britain	Nils-Obed Riecker; Germany	Jeremy Descloux; France

=== Women's events ===
Event	Gold	Silver	Bronze
Cross-country	Julie Bresset; France	Maja Włoszczowska; Poland	Esther Süss; Switzerland
Under 23 cross-country	Jolanda Neff; Switzerland	Pauline Ferrand-Prévot; France	Yana Belomoyna; Ukraine
Junior cross-country	Alessandra Keller; Switzerland	Emelie Collomb; Italy	Sarah Bauer; Germany
Cross-country eliminator	Alexandra Engen; Sweden	Jolanda Neff; Switzerland	Linda Indergand; Switzerland
Downhill	Rachel Atherton; Great Britain	Emmeline Ragot; France	Tracey Hannah; Australia
Junior downhill	Tahnée Seagrave; Great Britain	Danielle Beecroft; Australia	Tegan Molloy; Australia
Four-cross	Caroline Buchanan; Australia	Katy Curd; Great Britain	Céline Gros; France
Trials	Tatiana Janickova; Slovakia	Gemma Abant; Spain	Janine Jungfels; Australia

=== Team events ===
Event	Gold	Silver	Bronze
Cross-country	Italy; Marco Aurelio Fontana; Gioele Bertolini; Eva Lechner; Gerhard Kerschbaumer	France; Jordan Sarrou; Raphaël Gay; Julie Bresset; Maxime Marotte	Germany; Markus Schulte-Lünzum; Georg Egger; Hanna Klein; Manuel Fumic
Trials	Spain; Bernat Seuba; Benito Ros; Rafael Tibau; Gemma Abant	France; Aurélien Fontenoy; Jeremy Descloux; Gilles Coustellier; Marion Porcher	Germany; Lucas Krell; Matthias Mrohs; Hannes Herrmann; Andrea Wesp

== Medal table ==
Rank	Nation	Gold	Silver	Bronze	Total
1	ESP	3	1	2	6
1	SUI	3	1	2	6
3	GBR	3	1	1	5
4	FRA	2	7	4	13
5	AUS	2	2	4	8
6	ITA	2	1	1	4
7	GER	1	3	3	7
8	NED	1	0	1	2
9	RSA	1	0	0	1
9	SVK	1	0	0	1
9	SWE	1	0	0	1
9	USA	1	0	0	1
13	AUT	0	2	0	2
14	CAN	0	1	0	1
14	CZE	0	1	0	1
14	POL	0	1	0	1
17	ARG	0	0	1	1
17	BEL	0	0	1	1
17	UKR	0	0	1	1
Totals (19 entries)		21	21	21	63

== See also ==
- 2013 UCI Mountain Bike World Cup
