= Jack Carthy =

British mountain biker

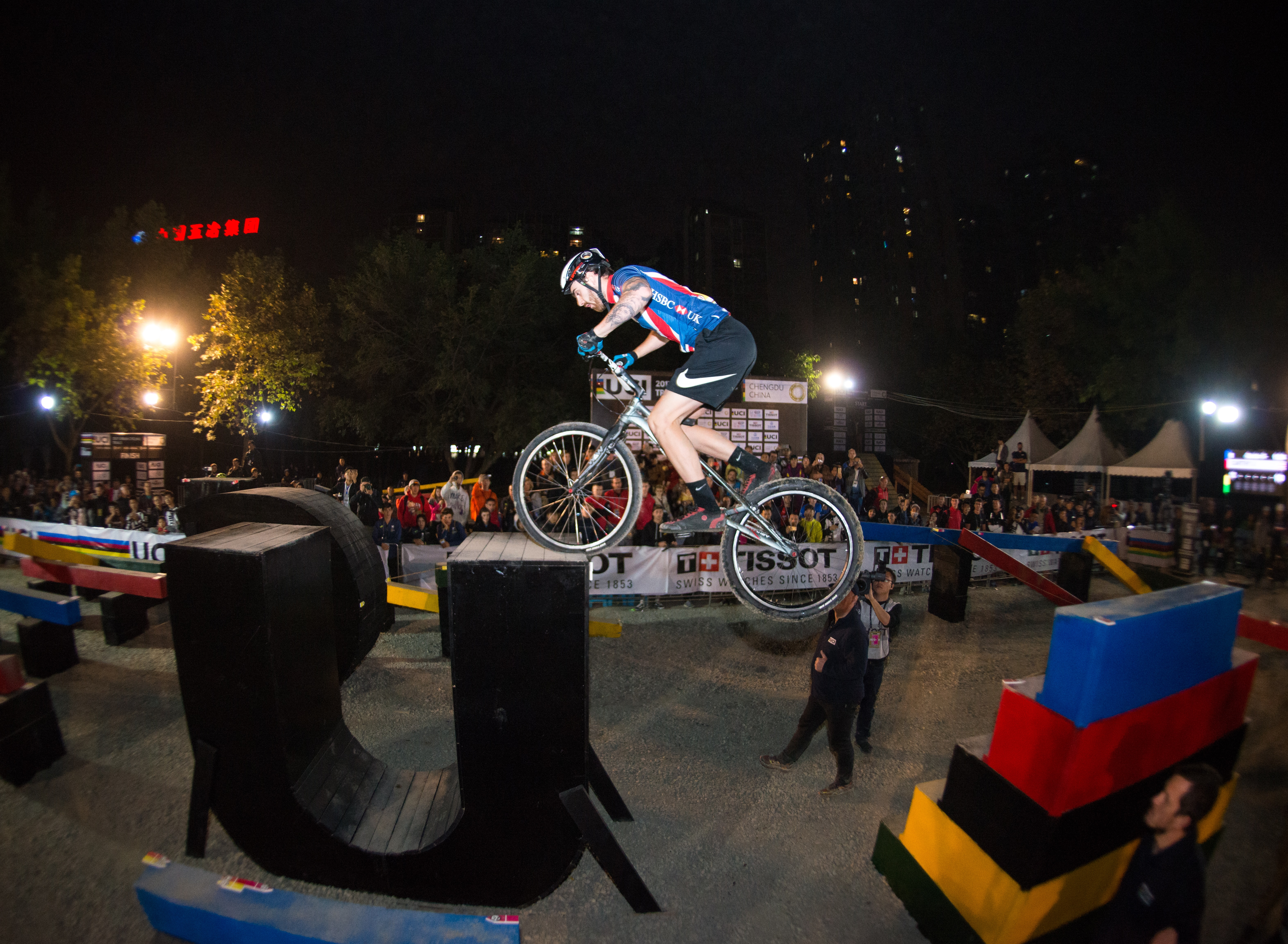
- Carthy in 2017

Personal information
- Full name: Jack Carthy
- Born: 8 August 1996 (age 30) Haworth, England

Cycling career
- Sport: Cycling
- Current team: Crewkerz Bikes
- Discipline: Trials
- Rider type: 26-inch trials

Major wins
- UCI World Championships 26-inch trials (2016) UCI World Cup 26-inch trials (2014, 2015, 2016)
Medal record
Representing Great Britain
Men's mountain bike trials
World Championships
Gold medal – first place	2013 Pietermaritzburg	Junior trials, 26"
Gold medal – first place	2014 Lillehammer	Junior trials, 26"
Gold medal – first place	2016 Val di Sole	Trials, 26"
Gold medal – first place	2017 Chengdu	Trials, 26"
Gold medal – first place	2024 Abu Dhabi	Trials, 26"
Silver medal – second place	2012 Saalfelden	Junior trials, 26"
Silver medal – second place	2015 Vallnord	Trials, 26"
European Championships
Gold medal – first place	2013 Bern	Junior trials, 26"
Gold medal – first place	2014 Walbrzych	Junior trials, 26"
Gold medal – first place	2015 Chies d'Alpago	Trials, 26"

Jack Carthy (born 8 August 1996 in Haworth, West Yorkshire, England) is a Mountain bike rider who competes in the 26-inch category. He is the reigning UCI elite world champion and UCI World Cup champion.

== Career ==
Carthy began competing on the elite UCI Trials World Cup in 2012. He finished third in his first World Cup event in Aalter, Belgium aged just 15. He won the overall Elite World Cup title in 2014 while still a junior, winning 3 of the 5 rounds. He successfully defended his World Cup title in 2015 and 2016 and is thus the reigning UCI World Cup champion.

Carthy was junior UCI world champion in 2013 and 2014 and junior European champion in 2014. In the Elite category in 2015 he was European champion and finished second in the UCI World Championships in Vallnord, Andorra.

In 2016 Carthy won the 2016 UCI World Championship in the elite 26-inch category in Val di Sole, Italy. He was the first British rider to win a UCI Elite Trials World Championship in any category. He retained his title in 2017, winning at the UCI Urban Cycling World Championships in China.

== Major events timeline ==
UCI Trials World Cup
Men Elite - 26"	2008	2009	2010	2011	2012	2013	2014	2015	2016	2017	2018	2019
Antwerp, BEL							1	1	1	1	1	
Albertville, FRA								2	1	3		
Les Menuires, FRA									1	5		
Vocklabruck, AUT								1	1	1	1	
Aalter, BEL										6		
Krakow, POL							2	1	7			
Moutier, FRA							1					
Meribel, FRA							1					
Pra Loup, FRA							1					
Berlin, DE											-	
Salzburg, AUT												1
Val di Sole, ITA											7	1
Il Ciocco, ITA												1
Overall Position							1	1	2			1

UCI Trials World Championships
Event	2008	2009	2010	2011	2012	2013	2014	2015	2016	2017	2018	2019
Elite Men - 26"												
Junior Men												
