= Iván Álvarez (cyclist) =

Spanish cyclist

Personal information
- Born: 18 December 1981 (age 44) Madrid, Spain

Cycling career
- Sport: Cycling
- Discipline: Mountain biking
Medal record
Men's mountain bike racing
Representing Spain
World Championships
Bronze medal – third place	2003 Lugano	Under-23 cross-country

Iván Álvarez (born 18 December 1981) is a Spanish former professional cyclist. He competed in the men's cross-country mountain biking event at the 2004 Summer Olympics.
