= 2001 UCI Mountain Bike & Trials World Championships =

- Venue: Vail, CO, United States
- Date: 12–16 September 2001
- Events: MTB: 12; Trials: 7

The 2001 UCI Mountain Bike & Trials World Championships were held in Vail, Colorado, United States from 12 to 16 September 2001. The disciplines included were cross-country, downhill, dual, and trials.

The event was the 12th edition of the UCI Mountain Bike World Championships and the 16th edition of the UCI Trials World Championships. It was the second time the UCI Mountain Bike World Championships had been held in Vail, the first having been in 1994. It was also the third time the championships had been held in Colorado, as the inaugural UCI Mountain Bike World Championships had been held in Durango in 1990.

== Medal summary ==
=== Men's events ===
Event	Gold	Silver	Bronze
Cross-country	Roland Green (CAN)	Thomas Frischknecht (SUI)	Christophe Sauser (SUI)
Under 23 cross-country	Julien Absalon (FRA)	Ryder Hesjedal (CAN)	Walker Ferguson (USA)
Junior cross-country	Inaki Lejarreta Errasti (ESP)	Lars Petter Nordhaug (NOR)	Trent Lowe (AUS)
Downhill	Nicolas Vouilloz (FRA)	Steve Peat (GBR)	Greg Minnaar (RSA)
Junior downhill	Ben Cory (AUS)	Julien Camellini (FRA)	Sam Hill (AUS)
Dual	Brian Lopes (USA)	Cédric Gracia (FRA)	Wade Bootes (AUS)
Trials, 20 inch	Rafal Kumorowski (POL)	Marco Hösel (GER)	Benito Ros Charral (ESP)
Trials, 26 inch	Marc Caisso (FRA)	Daniel Comas (ESP)	Bruno Arnold (FRA)
Junior trials, 20 inch	Kenny Belaey (BEL)	Simon Billmaier (GER)	Stefan Moor (SUI)
Junior trials, 26 inch	Vincent Hermance (FRA)	Thomas Ohler (AUT)	Kenny Belaey (BEL)

=== Women's events ===
Event	Gold	Silver	Bronze
Cross-country	Alison Dunlap (USA)	Alison Sydor (CAN)	Sabine Spitz (GER)
Junior cross-country	Nicole Cooke (GBR)	Maja Włoszczowska (POL)	Julie Pesenti (FRA)
Downhill	Anne-Caroline Chausson (FRA)	Fionn Griffiths (GBR)	Leigh Donovan (USA)
Junior downhill	Mio Suemasa (JPN)	Céline Gros (FRA)	Helen Gaskell (GBR)
Dual	Anne-Caroline Chausson (FRA)	Katrina Miller (AUS)	Tara Llannes (USA)
Trials	Karin Moor (SUI)	Floriane Combe (FRA)	Céline Walther (FRA)

=== Team events ===
Event	Gold	Silver	Bronze
Cross-country	Canada; Ryder Hesjedal; Roland Green; Adam Coates; Chrissy Redden	Australia; Sid Taberlay; Mary Grigson; Trent Lowe; Cadel Evans	Spain; José Antonio Hermida; Carlos Coloma; Iñaki Lejarreta; Janet Puiggros
Trials, 20 inch	Spain	Germany	Poland
Trials, 26 inch	France	Spain	Poland

=== Medal table ===
Rank	Nation	Gold	Silver	Bronze	Total
1	France (FRA)	7	4	3	14
2	Spain (ESP)	2	2	2	6
3	Canada (CAN)	2	2	0	4
4	United States (USA)	2	0	3	5
5	Australia (AUS)	1	2	3	6
6	Great Britain (GBR)	1	2	1	4
7	Poland (POL)	1	1	2	4
7	Switzerland (SUI)	1	1	2	4
9	Belgium (BEL)	1	0	1	2
10	Japan (JPN)	1	0	0	1
11	Germany (GER)	0	3	1	4
12	Austria (AUT)	0	1	0	1
12	Norway (NOR)	0	1	0	1
14	South Africa (RSA)	0	0	1	1
Totals (14 entries)		19	19	19	57

== See also ==
- 2001 UCI Mountain Bike World Cup
- UCI Mountain Bike Marathon World Championships
