= 2005 UCI Mountain Bike & Trials World Championships =

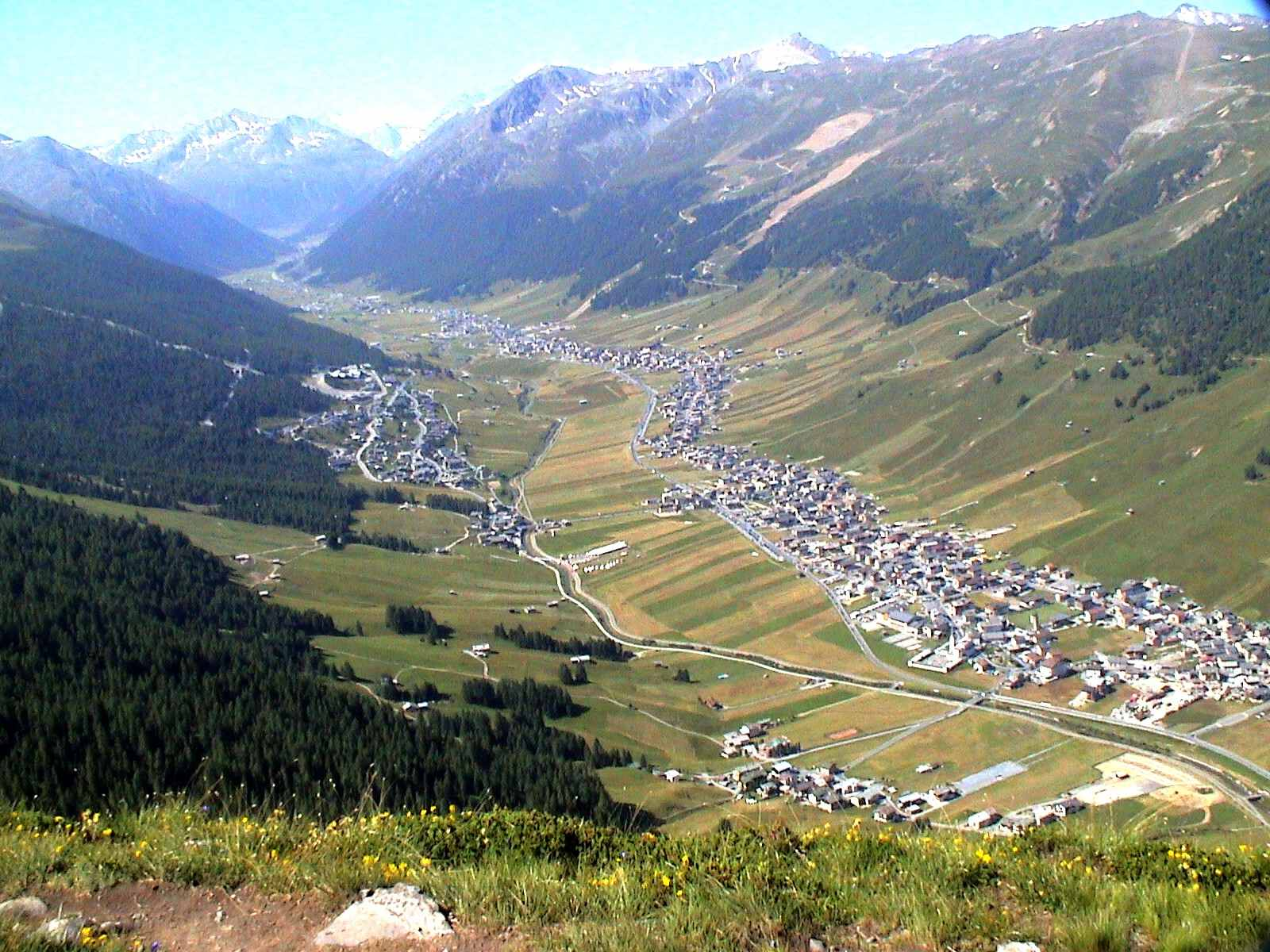
- Venue: Livigno, Italy
- Date: 31 August – 4 September 2005
- Events: MTB: 12; Trials: 6

The 2005 UCI Mountain Bike & Trials World Championships were held in Livigno, Italy from 31 August to 4 September 2005. The disciplines included were cross-country, downhill, four-cross, and trials. The event was the 16th edition of the UCI Mountain Bike World Championships and the 20th edition of the UCI Trials World Championships.

== Medal summary ==
=== Men's events ===
Event	Gold	Silver	Bronze
Cross-country	Julien Absalon (FRA)	Christoph Sauser (SUI)	José Antonio Hermida (ESP)
Under 23 cross-country	Yury Trofimov (RUS)	Lukas Flückiger (SUI)	Nino Schurter (SUI)
Junior cross-country	Robert Gehbauer (AUT)	Olivier Sarrazin (FRA)	Tim Wijnants (BEL)
Downhill	Fabien Barel (FRA)	Sam Hill (AUS)	Greg Minnaar (RSA)
Junior downhill	Amiel Cavalier (AUS)	Brendan Fairclough (GBR)	Liam Panozzo (AUS)
Four-cross	Brian Lopes (USA)	Jared Graves (AUS)	Mickael Deldycke (FRA)
Trials, 20 inch	Benito Ros Charral (ESP)	Marco Hösel (GER)	Juan Daniel de la Peña (ESP)
Trials, 26 inch	Kenny Belaey (BEL)	Vincent Hermance (FRA)	Benito Ros Charral (ESP)
Junior trials, 20 inch	Ben Slinger (GBR)	Marco Thomä (GER)	Karol Serwin (POL)
Junior trials, 26 inch	Ben Slinger (GBR)	Ben Savage (GBR)	Wesley Belaey (BEL)

=== Women's events ===
Event	Gold	Silver	Bronze
Cross-country	Gunn-Rita Dahle (NOR)	Maja Włoszczowska (POL)	Petra Henzi (SUI)
Junior cross-country	Tereza Hurikova (CZE)	Hanna Klein (GER)	Tanja Žakelj (SLO)
Downhill	Anne-Caroline Chausson (FRA)	Sabrina Jonnier (FRA)	Emmeline Ragot (FRA)
Junior downhill	Rachel Atherton (GBR)	Scarlett Hagen (NZL)	Micayla Gatto (CAN)
Four-cross	Jill Kintner (USA)	Katrina Miller (AUS)	Tara Llanes (USA)
Trials	Karin Moor (SUI)	Ann-Christin Bettenhausen (GER)	Mireia Abant Condal (ESP)

=== Team events ===
Event	Gold	Silver	Bronze
Cross-country	Spain; Ruben Ruzafa Cueto; Oliver Aviles Gilabert; Rocio Gamonal Ferrera; José Antonio Hermida	Italy; Marco Bui; Tony Longo; Eva Lechner; Johannes Schweiggl	France; Alexis Vuillermoz; Stéphane Tempier; Séverine Hansen; Cédric Ravanel
Trials	Germany	Spain	France

=== Medal table ===
Rank	Nation	Gold	Silver	Bronze	Total
1	France (FRA)	3	3	4	10
2	Great Britain (GBR)	3	2	0	5
3	Spain (ESP)	2	1	4	7
4	United States (USA)	2	0	1	3
5	Germany (GER)	1	4	0	5
6	Australia (AUS)	1	3	1	5
7	Switzerland (SUI)	1	2	2	5
8	Belgium (BEL)	1	0	2	3
9	Austria (AUT)	1	0	0	1
9	Czech Republic (CZE)	1	0	0	1
9	Norway (NOR)	1	0	0	1
9	Russia (RUS)	1	0	0	1
13	Poland (POL)	0	1	1	2
14	Italy (ITA)	0	1	0	1
14	New Zealand (NZL)	0	1	0	1
16	Canada (CAN)	0	0	1	1
16	Slovenia (SLO)	0	0	1	1
16	South Africa (RSA)	0	0	1	1
Totals (18 entries)		18	18	18	54

== See also ==
- 2005 UCI Mountain Bike World Cup
- UCI Mountain Bike Marathon World Championships
