= 2011 UCI Mountain Bike & Trials World Championships =

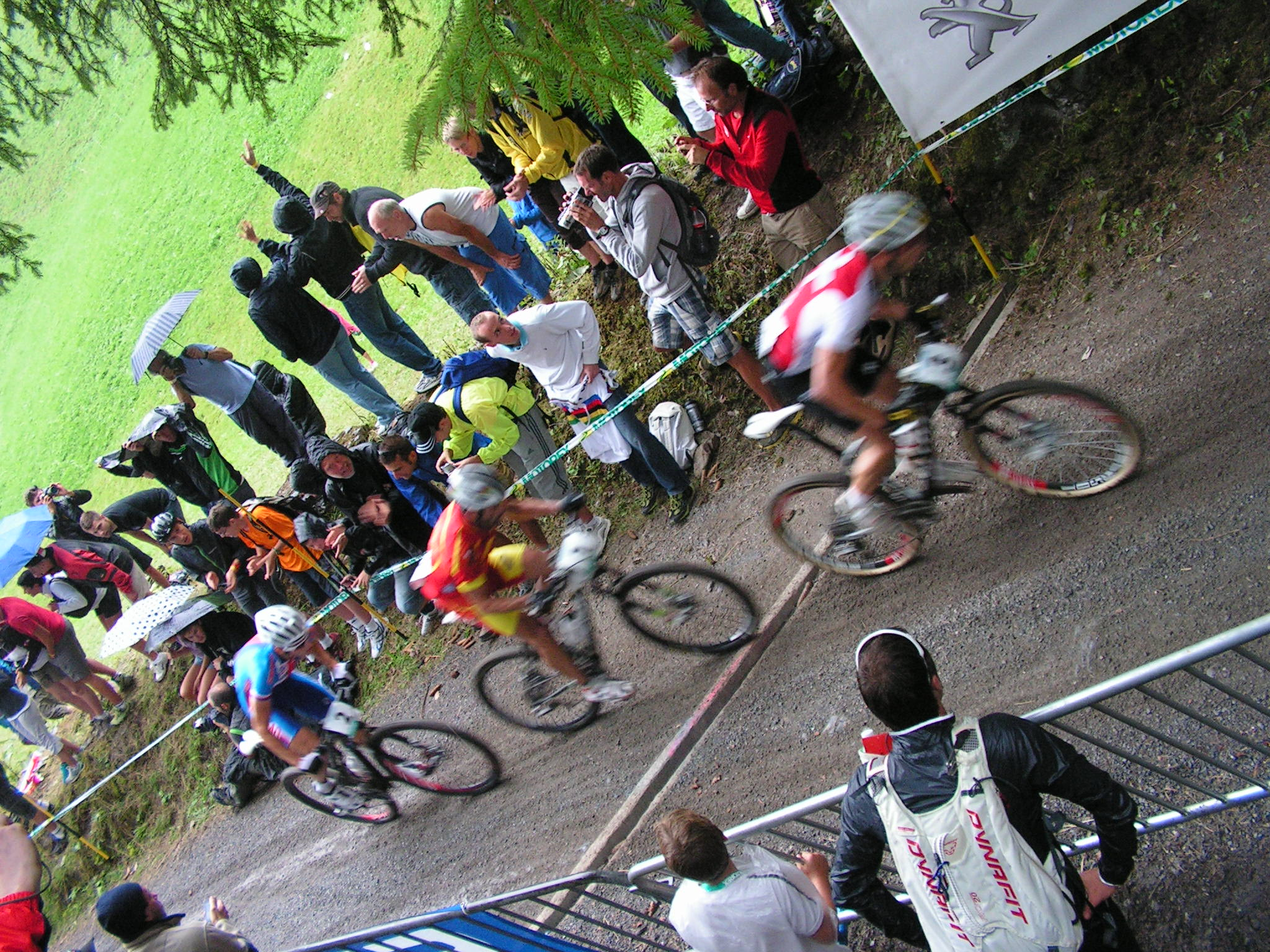
- Men's elite cross country at the 2011 UCI Mountain Bike & Trials World Championships
- Venue: Champéry, Switzerland
- Date: 31 August – 4 September 2011
- Events: MTB: 13; Trials: 6

The 2011 UCI Mountain Bike & Trials World Championships was the 22nd edition of the UCI Mountain Bike & Trials World Championships and was held in Champéry, Switzerland.

== Medal summary ==
=== Men's events ===
Event	Gold	Silver	Bronze
Cross-country	Jaroslav Kulhavý (CZE)	Nino Schurter (SUI)	Julien Absalon (FRA)
Under 23 cross-country	Thomas Litscher (SUI)	Marek Konwa (POL)	Henk Jaap Moorlag (NED)
Junior cross-country	Victor Koretzky (FRA)	Anton Cooper (NZL)	Andrey Fonseca (CRC)
Downhill	Danny Hart (GBR)	Damien Spagnolo (FRA)	Samuel Blenkinsop (NZL)
Junior downhill	Troy Brosnan (AUS)	David Trummer (AUT)	Guillaume Cauvin (FRA)
Four-cross	Michal Prokop (CZE)	Roger Rinderknecht (SUI)	Joost Wichman (NED)
Trials, 20 inch	Benito Ros Charral (ESP)	Abel Mustieles Garcia (ESP)	Gilles Coustellier (FRA)
Trials, 26 inch	Gilles Coustellier (FRA)	Kenny Belaey (BEL)	Vincent Hermance (FRA)
Junior trials, 20 inch	Raphael Pils (GER)	Marius Merger (FRA)	David Hoffmann (GER)
Junior trials, 26 inch	Marius Merger (FRA)	Yann Dunant (FRA)	Robin Fix (GER)

=== Women's events ===
Event	Gold	Silver	Bronze
Cross-country	Catharine Pendrel (CAN)	Maja Włoszczowska (POL)	Eva Lechner (ITA)
Under 23 cross-country	Julie Bresset (FRA)	Annie Last (GBR)	Pauline Ferrand-Prévot (FRA)
Junior cross-country	Linda Indergand (SUI)	Lena Putz (GER)	Julia Innerhofer (ITA)
Downhill	Emmeline Ragot (FRA)	Rachel Atherton (GBR)	Claire Buchar (CAN)
Junior downhill	Manon Carpenter (GBR)	Agnes Delest (FRA)	Lauren Rosser (CAN)
Four-cross	Anneke Beerten (NED)	Fionn Griffiths (GBR)	Céline Gros (FRA)
Trials	Karin Moor (SUI)	Gemma Abant Condal (ESP)	Mireia Abant Condal (ESP)

=== Team events ===
Event	Gold	Silver	Bronze
Cross-country	France; Fabien Canal; Victor Koretzky; Julie Bresset; Maxime Marotte	Switzerland; Thomas Litscher; Lars Forster; Nathalie Schneitter; Nino Schurter	Italy; Gerhard Kerschbaumer; Lorenzo Samparisi; Eva Lechner; Marco Aurelio Fontana
Trials	France; Marius Merger; Gilles Coustellier; Yann Dunant; Vincent Hermance	Germany; Raphael Pils; Matthias Mrohs; Romina Fox; Robin Fix; Hannes Herrmann	Switzerland; Lucien Leiser; Loris Braun; Karin Moor; David Bonzon; Jérome Chapuis

=== Medal table ===
Rank	Nation	Gold	Silver	Bronze	Total
1	France	7	4	6	17
2	Switzerland	3	3	1	7
3	Great Britain	2	3	0	5
4	Czech Republic	2	0	0	2
5	Germany	1	2	2	5
6	Spain	1	2	1	4
7	Canada	1	0	2	3
7	Netherlands	1	0	2	3
9	Australia	1	0	0	1
10	Poland	0	2	0	2
11	New Zealand	0	1	1	2
12	Austria	0	1	0	1
12	Belgium	0	1	0	1
14	Italy	0	0	3	3
15	Costa Rica	0	0	1	1
Totals (15 entries)		19	19	19	57

== See also ==
- 2011 UCI Mountain Bike World Cup
