= 2009 UCI Mountain Bike & Trials World Championships =

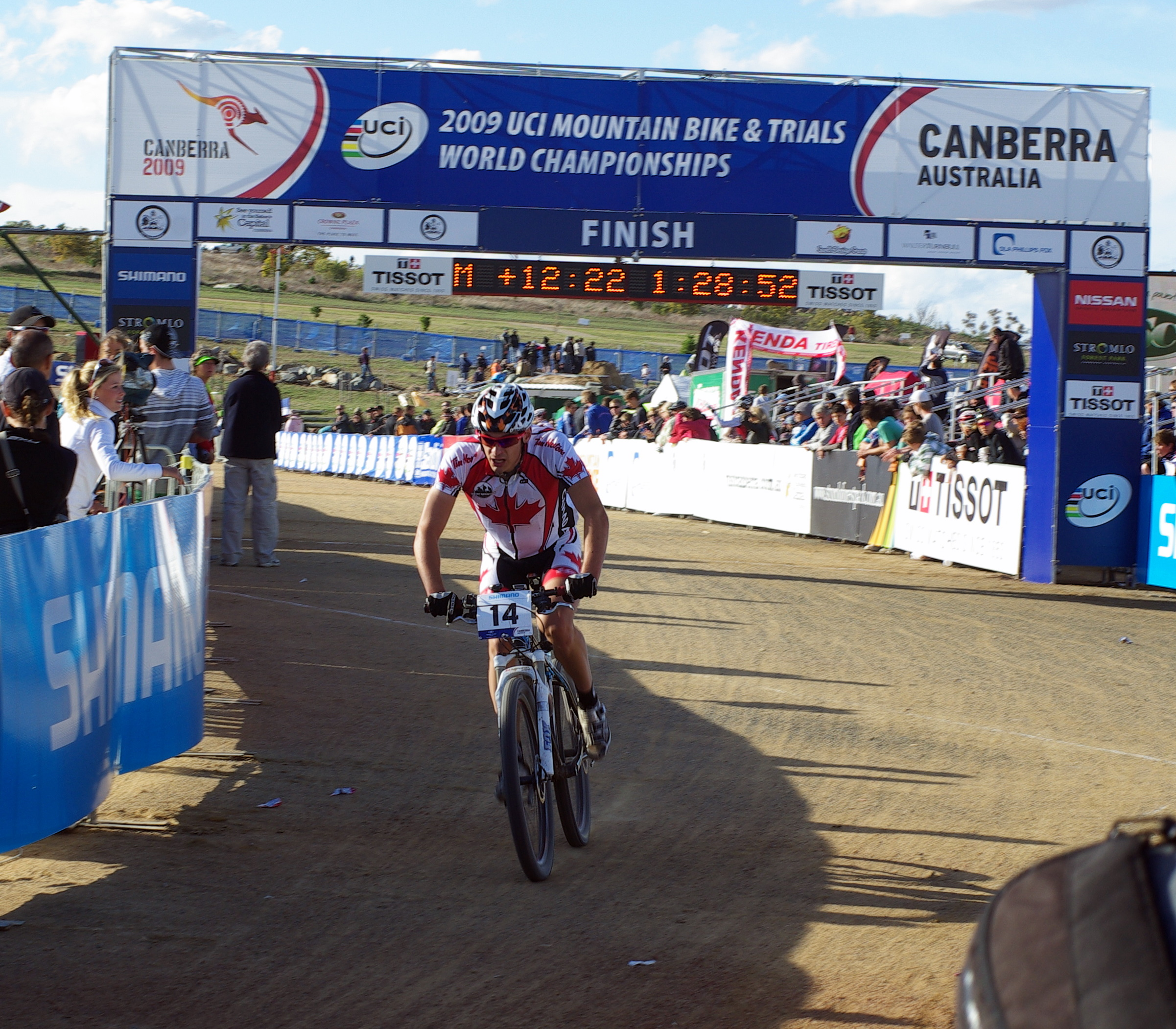
- Under 23 men's cross-country at the 2009 UCI Mountain Bike & Trials World Championships
- Venue: Canberra, Australia
- Date: 1–6 September 2009
- Events: MTB: 13; Trials: 6

The 2009 UCI Mountain Bike & Trials World Championships were held in Canberra, Australia from 1 to 6 September 2009. The disciplines included were cross-country, downhill, four-cross, and trials. The event was the 20th edition of the UCI Mountain Bike World Championships and the 24th edition of the UCI Trials World Championships.

The event was the second UCI Mountain Bike World Championships to be held in Australia, following the 1996 World Championships in Cairns.

== Medal summary ==
=== Men's events ===
Event	Gold	Silver	Bronze
Cross-country	Nino Schurter (SUI)	Julien Absalon (FRA)	Florian Vogel (SUI)
Under 23 cross-country	Burry Stander (RSA)	Alexis Vuillermoz (FRA)	Thomas Litscher (SUI)
Junior cross-country	Gerhard Kerschbaumer (ITA)	Ricardo Paulo Reis Marinheiro (POR)	Reto Indergand (SUI)
Downhill	Steve Peat (GBR)	Greg Minnaar (RSA)	Michael Hannah (AUS)
Junior downhill	Brook Macdonald (NZL)	Shaun O'Connor (AUS)	Danny Hart (GBR)
Four-cross	Jared Graves (AUS)	Romain Saladini (FRA)	Jakub Riha (CZE)
Trials, 20 inch	Benito Ros Charral (ESP)	Rafal Kumorowski (POL)	Loris Braun (SUI)
Trials, 26 inch	Gilles Coustellier (FRA)	Kenny Belaey (BEL)	Vincent Hermance (FRA)
Junior trials, 20 inch	Abel Mustieles (ESP)	Ion Areitio (ESP)	Roderique Timellini (BEL)
Junior trials, 26 inch	Joe Oakley (GBR)	Abel Mustieles (ESP)	Rafael Tibau (ESP)

=== Women's events ===
Event	Gold	Silver	Bronze
Cross-country	Irina Kalentieva (RUS)	Lene Byberg (NOR)	Willow Koerber (USA)
Under 23 cross-country	Aleksandra Dawidowicz (POL)	Alexandra Engen (SWE)	Julie Bresset (FRA)
Junior cross-country	Pauline Ferrand-Prévot (FRA)	Michelle Hediger (SUI)	Candice Neethling (RSA)
Downhill	Emmeline Ragot (FRA)	Tracy Moseley (GBR)	Kathleen Pruitt (USA)
Junior downhill	Anais Pajot (FRA)	Julie Berteaux (FRA)	Holly Baarspul (AUS)
Four-cross	Caroline Buchanan (AUS)	Jill Kintner (USA)	Melissa Buhl (USA)
Trials	Karin Moor (SUI)	Julie Pesenti (FRA)	Gemma Abant Condal (ESP)

=== Team events ===
Event	Gold	Silver	Bronze
Cross-country	Italy; Marco Aurelio Fontana; Gerhard Kerschbaumer; Eva Lechner; Cristian Cominelli	Canada; Raphael Gagne; Geoff Kabush; Evan Guthrie; Catharine Pendrel	France; Alexis Vuillermoz; Cédric Ravanel; Hugo Drechou; Cécile Rode Ravanel
Trials	Spain	France	Belgium

=== Medal table ===
Rank	Nation	Gold	Silver	Bronze	Total
1	France (FRA)	4	6	3	13
2	Spain (ESP)	3	2	2	7
3	Switzerland (SUI)	2	1	4	7
4	Australia (AUS)	2	1	2	5
5	Great Britain (GBR)	2	1	1	4
6	Italy (ITA)	2	0	0	2
7	South Africa (RSA)	1	1	1	3
8	Poland (POL)	1	1	0	2
9	New Zealand (NZL)	1	0	0	1
9	Russia (RUS)	1	0	0	1
11	United States (USA)	0	1	3	4
12	Belgium (BEL)	0	1	2	3
13	Canada (CAN)	0	1	0	1
13	Norway (NOR)	0	1	0	1
13	Portugal (POR)	0	1	0	1
13	Sweden (SWE)	0	1	0	1
17	Czech Republic (CZE)	0	0	1	1
Totals (17 entries)		19	19	19	57

== See also ==
- 2009 UCI Mountain Bike World Cup
