= 2003 UCI Mountain Bike & Trials World Championships =

- Venue: Lugano, Switzerland
- Date: 31 August – 7 September 2003
- Events: MTB: 14; Trials: 5

The 2003 UCI Mountain Bike & Trials World Championships were held in Lugano, Switzerland from 31 August to 7 September 2003. The disciplines included were cross-country, cross-country marathon, downhill, four-cross, and trials. The event was the 14th edition of the UCI Mountain Bike World Championships and the 18th edition of the UCI Trials World Championships.

This was the first year that the cross-country marathon was included in the UCI Mountain Bike & Trials World Championships. From 2004 onwards, the cross-country marathon was run as a separate world championship.

Anne-Caroline Chausson of France won her eighth consecutive world title in the women's downhill. As of 2016, no other rider has won more than two consecutive world titles in the event.

Greg Minnaar of South Africa won the world title in the men's downhill. He thus became the first rider from the continent of Africa to win a mountain biking world championship in an elite category.

== Medal summary ==
=== Men's events ===
Event	Gold	Silver	Bronze
Cross-country	Filip Meirhaeghe (BEL)	Ryder Hesjedal (CAN)	Roel Paulissen (BEL)
Under 23 cross-country	Balz Weber (SUI)	Manuel Fumic (GER)	Ivan Alvarez (ESP)
Junior cross-country	Jaroslav Kulhavý (CZE)	Nino Schurter (SUI)	Oleksandr Yakymenko (UKR)
Cross-country marathon	Thomas Frischknecht (SUI)	Bart Brentjens (NED)	Carsten Bresser (GER)
Downhill	Greg Minnaar (RSA)	Mickael Pascal (FRA)	Fabien Barel (FRA)
Junior downhill	Sam Hill (AUS)	Gee Atherton (GBR)	Cyrille Kurtz (FRA)
Four-cross	Michal Prokop (CZE)	Eric Carter (USA)	Brian Lopes (USA)
Trials, 20 inch	Benito Ros Charral (ESP)	Marco Hösel (GER)	Vincent Hermance (FRA)
Trials, 26 inch	Giacomo Coustellier (FRA)	Marc Caisso (FRA)	Kenny Belaey (BEL)
Junior trials, 20 inch	Diego Barrio Roa (ESP)	Gilles Coustellier (FRA)	Remy Morgan (FRA)
Junior trials, 26 inch	Gilles Coustellier (FRA)	Alexis Touteau (FRA)	Thibault Veuillet (FRA)

=== Women's events ===
Event	Gold	Silver	Bronze
Cross-country	Sabine Spitz (GER)	Alison Sydor (CAN)	Irina Kalentieva (RUS)
Junior cross-country	Lisa Mathison (AUS)	Eva Lechner (ITA)	Almut Grieb (GER)
Cross-country marathon	Maja Włoszczowska (POL)	Magdalena Sadlecka (POL)	Sandra Klose (GER)
Downhill	Anne-Caroline Chausson (FRA)	Sabrina Jonnier (FRA)	Nolvenn Le Caer (FRA)
Junior downhill	Emmeline Ragot (FRA)	Scarlett Hagen (NZL)	Bernardita Pizarro (CHI)
Four-cross	Anne-Caroline Chausson (FRA)	Sabrina Jonnier (FRA)	Jill Kintner (USA)
Trials	Karin Moor (SUI)	Ann-Christin Bettenhausen (GER)	Lucie Miramond (FRA)

=== Team events ===
Event	Gold	Silver	Bronze
Cross-country	Poland; Marcin Karczynski; Piotr Formicki; Anna Szafraniec; Kryspin Pyrgies	Switzerland; Ralph Näf; Balz Weber; Nino Schurter; Barbara Blatter	Canada; Roland Green; Ricky Federau; Max Plaxton; Christina Redden

=== Medal table ===
Rank	Nation	Gold	Silver	Bronze	Total
1	France (FRA)	5	6	7	18
2	Switzerland (SUI)	3	2	0	5
3	Poland (POL)	2	1	0	3
4	Spain (ESP)	2	0	1	3
5	Australia (AUS)	2	0	0	2
5	Czech Republic (CZE)	2	0	0	2
7	Germany (GER)	1	3	3	7
8	Belgium (BEL)	1	0	2	3
9	South Africa (RSA)	1	0	0	1
10	Canada (CAN)	0	2	1	3
11	United States (USA)	0	1	2	3
12	Great Britain (GBR)	0	1	0	1
12	Italy (ITA)	0	1	0	1
12	Netherlands (NED)	0	1	0	1
12	New Zealand (NZL)	0	1	0	1
16	Chile (CHI)	0	0	1	1
16	Russia (RUS)	0	0	1	1
16	Ukraine (UKR)	0	0	1	1
Totals (18 entries)		19	19	19	57

== See also ==
- 2003 UCI Mountain Bike World Cup
- UCI Mountain Bike Marathon World Championships
