= UCI Trials World Championships – Junior men's trials, 26 inch =

The junior men's trials, 26 inch is a trials event at the annual UCI Urban Cycling World Championships. It has been a UCI World Championship event since 1995.

From 1986 to 1999, the UCI world championships in trials were run as the UCI Trials World Championships. From 2000 to 2016, the world championships in trials were held alongside other mountain-biking disciplines as the UCI Mountain Bike & Trials World Championships. Beginning in 2017, the UCI trials world championships will be run as part of the UCI Urban Cycling World Championships.

The '26-inch' designation refers to the wheel diameter of the bikes that may be used in the competition. As this is a standard diameter for a mountain bike, the bikes used in 26-inch trials are also known as 'stock' bikes.

== Medalists ==
Championships	Gold	Silver	Bronze
1995 Grossheubach am Main	Marc Vinco; France	Dave Rollier; Switzerland	Bruno Arnold; France
1996 Zuoz	Marc Vinco; France	Marc Caisso; France	Christian Weber; Germany
1997 Avoriaz	Marc Caisso; France	Marc Amory Buteneers; Belgium	Christian Weber; Germany
1998 Cartagena	Marco Hösel; Germany	Tomasz Wozniak; Poland	Marc Amory Buteneers; Belgium
1999 Avoriaz	Rafał Kumorowski; Poland	Marc Amory Buteneers; Belgium	Cedric Calvin; France
2000 Sierra Nevada	Kenny Belaey; Belgium	Giacomo Coustellier; France	Thomas Ohler; Austria
2001 Vail	Vincent Hermance; France	Thomas Ohler; Austria	Kenny Belaey; Belgium
2002 Kaprun	Giacomo Coustellier; France	Gilles Coustellier; France	Marc Soulas; France
2003 Lugano	Gilles Coustellier; France	Alexis Touteau; France	Thibault Veuillet; France
2004 Les Gets	Ben Savage; Great Britain	Florian Tournier; Great Britain	Sébastian Hoffmann; Germany
2005 Livigno	Ben Slinger; Great Britain	Ben Savage; Great Britain	Wesley Belaey; Belgium
2006 Rotorua	Aurélien Fontenoy; France	Ben Slinger; Great Britain	Mattihas Mrohs; Germany
2007 Fort William	Aurélien Fontenoy; France	Loris Braun; Switzerland	Hannes Herrmann; Germany
2008 Val di Sole	Loris Braun; Switzerland	Jamis Burton; Canada	Kevin Aglae; France
2009 Canberra	Joe Oakley; Great Britain	Abel Mustieles; Spain	Rafael Tibau; Belgium
2010 Mont-Sainte-Anne	Ion Areitio; Spain	David Bonzon; Switzerland	Maxime Tolu; France
2011 Champery	Marius Merger; France	Yann Dunant; France	Robin Fix; Germany
2012 Leogang-Saalfelden	David Bonzon; Switzerland	Jack Carthy; Great Britain	Eloi Paré; Spain
2013 Pietermaritzburg	Jack Carthy; Great Britain	Nils-Obed Riecker; Germany	Jéremy Descloux; France
2014 Lillehammer-Hafjell	Jack Carthy; Great Britain	Sergi Llongueras; Spain	Dominik Oswald; Germany
2015 Vallnord	Nicolas Vallée; France	Dominik Oswald; Germany	Nicolas Fleury; France
2016 Val di Sole	Nicolas Vallée; France	Jordi Araque; Spain	Noah Cardona; France
2017 Chengdu	Nathan Charra; France	Tomu Shiozaki; Japan	Noah Cardona; France
2018 Chengdu	Oliver Widmann; Germany	Felix Keitel; Germany	Nathan Charra; France
2019 Chengdu	Oliver Widmann; Germany	Vito Gonzalez; Switzerland	Daniel Barón; Spain
2021 Vic	Daniel Cegarra; Spain	Tomáš Vepřek; Czech Republic	Vojtěch Kalaš; Czech Republic
2022 Abu Dhabi	Diego Garrués; Spain	Daniel Cegarra; Spain	Titouan Corre; France
2023 Glasgow	Daniel Cegarra; Spain	Luka Pasturel; France	Nicolas Ostheimer; Austria
2024 Abu Dhabi	Roman Salaun; France	Vojtěch Hendrych; Czech Republic	Ferrán Gonzalo; Spain
2025 Riyadh	Ferrán Gonzalo; Spain	Carl Christ; Germany	Ian Martínez; Spain

== Medal table ==
Rank	Nation	Gold	Silver	Bronze	Total
1	France	13	6	12	31
2	Spain	5	4	4	13
3	Great Britain	5	4	0	9
4	Germany	3	4	7	14
5	Switzerland	2	4	0	6
6	Belgium	1	2	4	7
7	Poland	1	1	0	2
8	Czech Republic	0	2	1	3
9	Austria	0	1	2	3
10	Canada	0	1	0	1
10	Japan	0	1	0	1
Totals (11 entries)		30	30	30	90
