= Gilles Coustellier =

French mountain bike cyclist

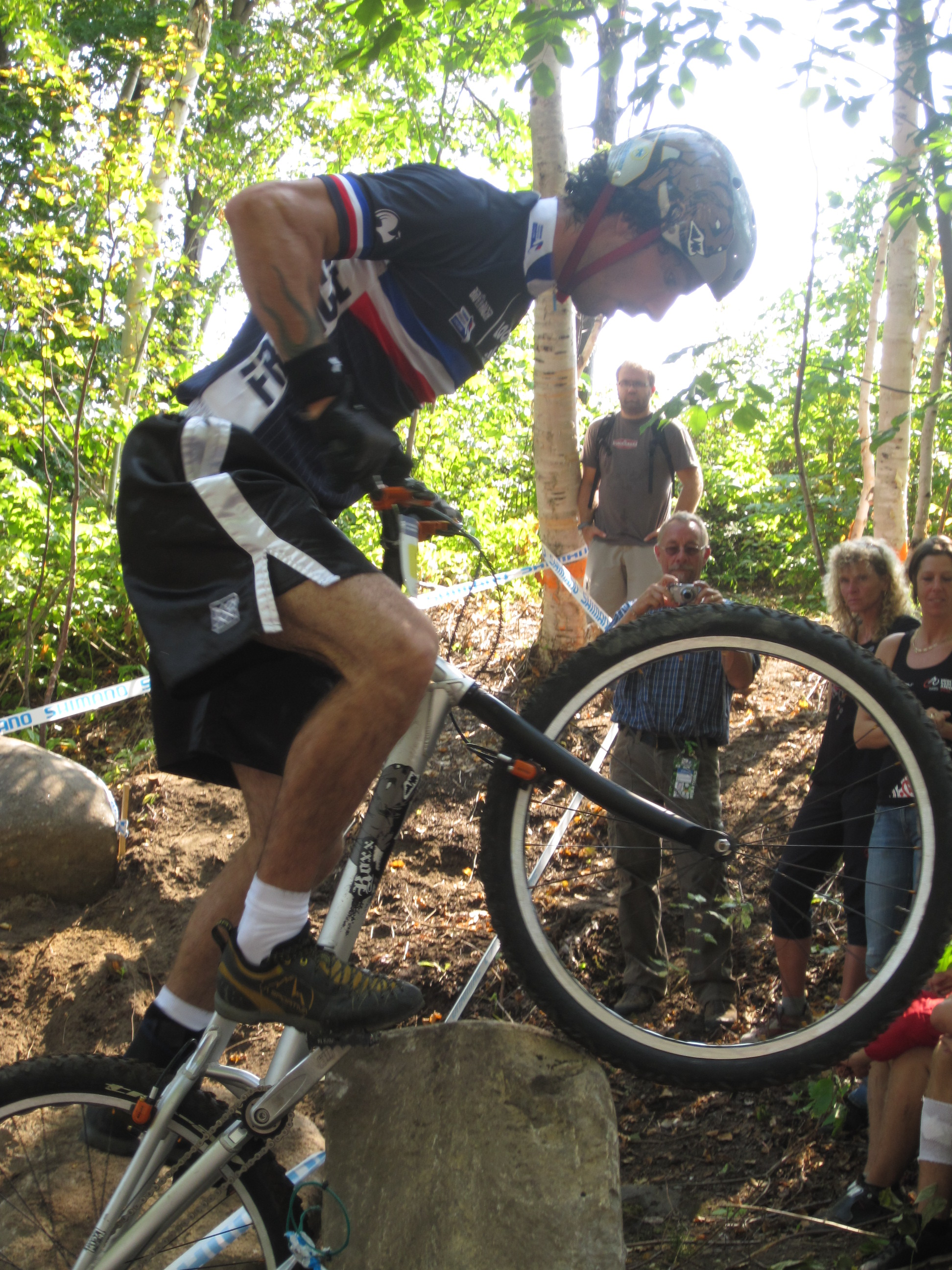

Personal information
- Full name: Gilles Coustellier
- Born: 31 May 1986 (age 40) Martigues, France

Cycling career
- Sport: Cycling
- Current team: Scorpio
- Discipline: Trials

Major wins
- World Championships 26-inch trials (2008, 2009, 2011, 2012, 2014)
Medal record
Representing France
Men's mountain bike trials
World Championships
Gold medal – first place	2002 Kaprun	Junior trials, 20"
Gold medal – first place	2003 Lugano	Junior trials, 26"
Gold medal – first place	2008 Val di Sole	Trials, 26"
Gold medal – first place	2009 Canberra	Trials, 26"
Gold medal – first place	2011 Champéry	Trials, 26"
Gold medal – first place	2011 Champéry	Trials, team
Gold medal – first place	2012 Leogang-Saalfelden	Trials, 26"
Gold medal – first place	2014 Lillehammer-Hafjell	Trials, 26"
Silver medal – second place	2002 Kaprun	Junior trials, 26"
Silver medal – second place	2003 Lugano	Junior trials, 20"
Silver medal – second place	2007 Fort William	Trials, 26"
Silver medal – second place	2009 Canberra	Trials, team
Silver medal – second place	2012 Leogang-Saalfelden	Trials, team
Silver medal – second place	2013 Pietermaritzburg	Trials, 26"
Silver medal – second place	2013 Pietermaritzburg	Trials, team
Silver medal – second place	2016 Val di Sole	Trials, 26"
Bronze medal – third place	2011 Champéry	Trials, 20"

Gilles Coustellier (born 13 May 1986 in Martigues, France) is a French mountain bike trials cyclist. He specialises in 26-inch trials but has also competed in 20-inch trials.

Coustellier was UCI junior world champion in the 20-inch category in 2002 and then in the 26-inch category in 2003. In the UCI elite 26-inch category he has been world champion five times. Competing with the French team he was team trials world champion in 2011.

Gilles is the younger brother of Giacomo Coustellier, who is also a trials rider.
