= 2000 UCI Mountain Bike & Trials World Championships =

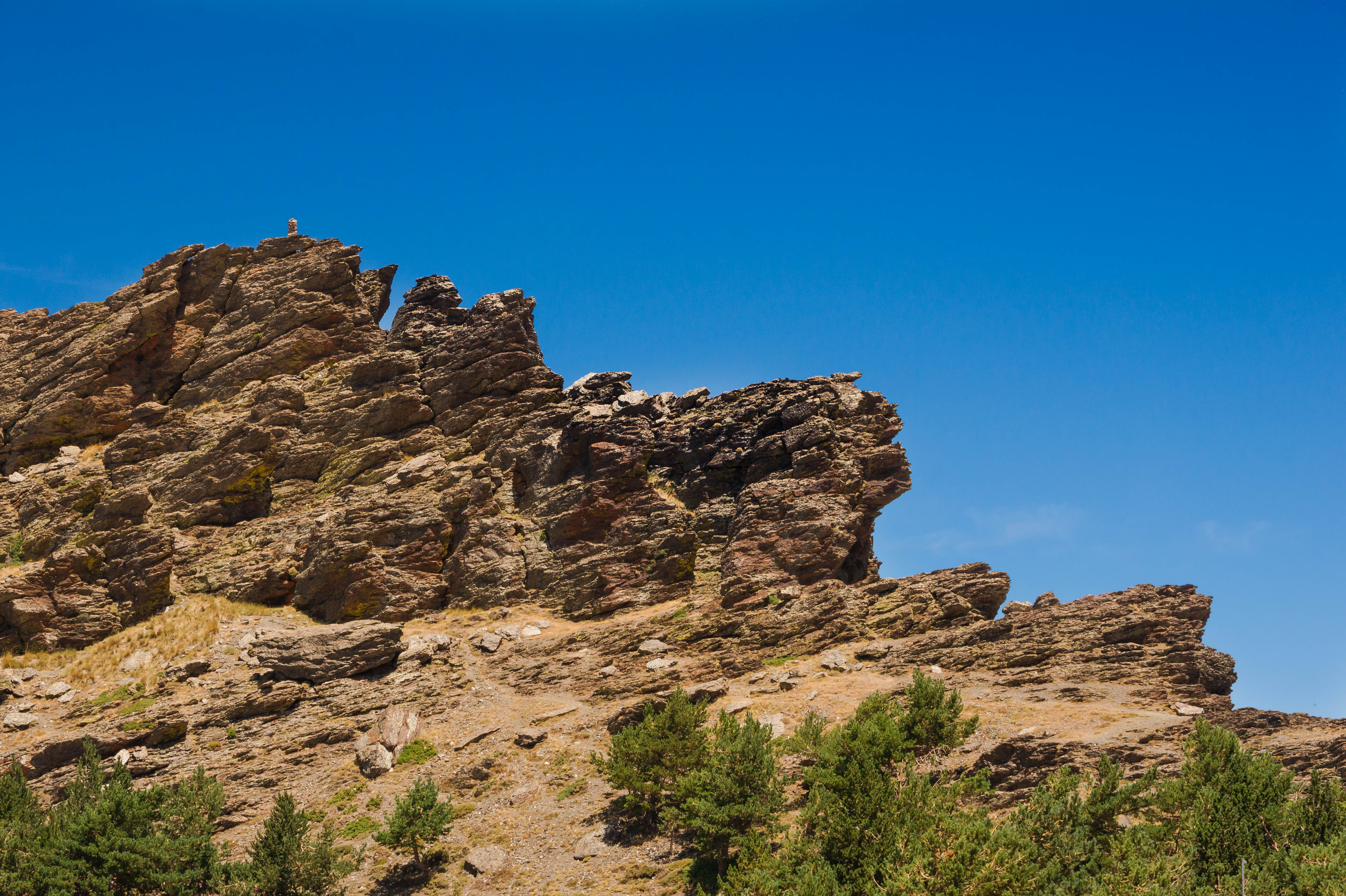
- Venue: Sierra Nevada, Spain
- Date: 7–11 June 2000
- Events: MTB: 12; Trials: 6

The 2000 UCI Mountain Bike & Trials World Championships were held in Sierra Nevada, Andalusia, Spain from 7 to 11 June 2000. The disciplines included were cross-country, downhill, dual slalom, and trials. The event was the 11th edition of the UCI Mountain Bike World Championships and the 15th edition of the UCI Trials World Championships.

== Medal summary ==
=== Men's events ===
Event	Gold	Silver	Bronze
Cross-country	Miguel Martinez (FRA)	Roland Green (CAN)	Bart Brentjens (NED)
Under 23 cross-country	José Antonio Hermida (ESP)	Marti Gispert Labarta (ESP)	Kashi Leuchs (NZL)
Junior cross-country	Walker Ferguson (USA)	Iñaki Lejarreta Errasti (ESP)	Florian Vogel (SUI)
Downhill	Myles Rockwell (USA)	Steve Peat (GBR)	Mickael Pascal (FRA)
Junior downhill	Julien Poomans (FRA)	Michael Hannah (AUS)	Jean-Paul Labossiere (FRA)
Dual slalom	Wade Bootes (AUS)	Brian Lopes (USA)	Mickael Deldycke (FRA)
Trials, 20 inch	Daniel Comas (ESP)	Marco Hösel (GER)	Juan Antonio Linares (ESP)
Trials, 26 inch	Marc Vinco (FRA)	Marc Caisso (FRA)	Bruno Arnold (FRA)
Junior trials, 20 inch	Kenny Belaey (BEL)	Simon Billmaier (GER)	Michael Hampel (GER)
Junior trials, 26 inch	Kenny Belaey (BEL)	Giacomo Coustellier (FRA)	Thomas Ohler (AUT)

=== Women's events ===
Event	Gold	Silver	Bronze
Cross-country	Margarita Fullana (ESP)	Alison Sydor (CAN)	Paola Pezzo (ITA)
Junior cross-country	Sonja Traxel (SUI)	Maja Włoszczowska (POL)	Nicole Cooke (GBR)
Downhill	Anne-Caroline Chausson (FRA)	Katja Repo (FIN)	Marla Streb (USA)
Junior downhill	Kathy Pruitt (USA)	Helen Gaskell (GBR)	Fionn Griffiths (GBR)
Dual slalom	Anne-Caroline Chausson (FRA)	Tara Llanes (USA)	Sabrina Jonnier (FRA)

=== Team events ===
Event	Gold	Silver	Bronze
Cross-country	Spain; Roberto Lezaun; Margarita Fullana; Iñaki Lejarreta Errasti; José Antonio Hermida	Switzerland; Christophe Sauser; Florian Vogel; Barbara Blatter; Silvio Bundi	Italy; Marco Bui; Leonardo Zanotti; Mirko Faranisi; Paola Pezzo
Trials, 20 inch	Spain	Germany	Poland
Trials, 26 inch	France	Spain	Poland

=== Medal table ===
Rank	Nation	Gold	Silver	Bronze	Total
1	France (FRA)	6	2	5	13
2	Spain (ESP)	5	3	1	9
3	United States (USA)	3	2	1	6
4	Belgium (BEL)	2	0	0	2
5	Switzerland (SUI)	1	1	1	3
6	Australia (AUS)	1	1	0	2
7	Germany (GER)	0	3	1	4
8	Great Britain (GBR)	0	2	2	4
9	Canada (CAN)	0	2	0	2
10	Poland (POL)	0	1	2	3
11	Finland (FIN)	0	1	0	1
12	Italy (ITA)	0	0	2	2
13	Austria (AUT)	0	0	1	1
13	Netherlands (NED)	0	0	1	1
13	New Zealand (NZL)	0	0	1	1
Totals (15 entries)		18	18	18	54

== See also ==
- 2000 UCI Mountain Bike World Cup
- UCI Mountain Bike Marathon World Championships
