= 2002 UCI Mountain Bike & Trials World Championships =

- Venue: Kaprun, Austria
- Date: 24 August – 1 September 2002
- Events: MTB: 12; Trials: 7

The 2002 UCI Mountain Bike & Trials World Championships were held in Kaprun, Austria from 24 August to 1 September 2002. The disciplines included were cross-country, downhill, four-cross, and trials. This was the first UCI world championship in which four-cross was included, replacing the dual that had been run at the previous two championships.

The event was the 13th edition of the UCI Mountain Bike World Championships and the 17th edition of the UCI Trials World Championships. It was also the first UCI Mountain Bike World Championships to be held in Austria.

Roland Green of Canada successfully defended his world title in the men's cross-country. Gunn-Rita Dahle of Norway won her first world title in the women's cross-country.

French riders won three of the four downhill events, including the two elite categories. Nicolas Vouilloz won his seventh world title in the men's downhill. Having won the junior downhill world title three times, this was his tenth world title overall. Anne-Caroline Chausson won her seventh consecutive world title in the women's downhill.

Riders from Australia won three of the four world titles in the junior mountain bike (cross-country and downhill) events.

== Medal summary ==
=== Men's events ===
| Event | Gold | Silver | Bronze |
|---|---|---|---|
| Cross-country | Roland Green (CAN) | Filip Meirhaeghe (BEL) | Thomas Frischknecht (SUI) |
| Under 23 cross-country | Julien Absalon (FRA) | Ralph Näf (SUI) | Ryder Hesjedal (CAN) |
| Junior cross-country | Trent Lowe (AUS) | Iouri Trofimov (RUS) | Tony Longo (ITA) |
| Downhill | Nicolas Vouilloz (FRA) | Steve Peat (GBR) | Chris Kovarik (AUS) |
| Junior downhill | Sam Hill (AUS) | Gee Atherton (GBR) | Justin Havukainen (AUS) |
| Four-cross | Brian Lopes (USA) | Cédric Gracia (FRA) | Eric Carter (USA) |
| Trials, 20 inch | Marco Hösel (GER) | Juan Antonio Linares (ESP) | Peter Bartak (SVK) |
| Trials, 26 inch | Kenny Belaey (BEL) | Marc Vinco (FRA) | Marc Caisso (FRA) |
| Junior trials, 20 inch | Gilles Coustellier (FRA) | Diego Barrio Roa (ESP) | Giacomo Coustellier (FRA) |
| Junior trials, 26 inch | Giacomo Coustellier (FRA) | Gilles Coustellier (FRA) | Marc Soulas (FRA) |

=== Women's events ===
| Event | Gold | Silver | Bronze |
|---|---|---|---|
| Cross-country | Gunn-Rita Dahle (NOR) | Anna Szafraniec (POL) | Sabine Spitz (GER) |
| Junior cross-country | Lisa Mathison (AUS) | Elisabeth Osl (AUT) | Petra Bublova (CZE) |
| Downhill | Anne-Caroline Chausson (FRA) | Fionn Griffiths (GBR) | Missy Giove (USA) |
| Junior downhill | Emmeline Ragot (FRA) | Claire Bauchet (FRA) | Diana Marggraff (ECU) |
| Four-cross | Anne-Caroline Chausson (FRA) | Katrina Miller (AUS) | Sabrina Jonnier (FRA) |
| Trials | Karin Moor (SUI) | Lucie Miramond (FRA) | Floriane Combe (FRA) |

=== Team events ===
| Event | Gold | Silver | Bronze |
|---|---|---|---|
| Cross-country | Canada; Ryder Hesjedal; Roland Green; Max Plaxton; Alison Sydor | France; Julien Absalon; Jean Eudes; Laurence Leboucher; Cedric Ravanel | Switzerland; Florian Vogel; Thomas Frischknecht; Lukas Flückinger; Petra Henzi |
| Trials, 20 inch | France | Spain | Poland |
| Trials, 26 inch | France | Czech Republic | Poland |

=== Medal table ===
| Rank | Nation | Gold | Silver | Bronze | Total |
|---|---|---|---|---|---|
| 1 | France (FRA) | 9 | 6 | 5 | 20 |
| 2 | Australia (AUS) | 3 | 1 | 2 | 6 |
| 3 | Canada (CAN) | 2 | 0 | 1 | 3 |
| 4 | Switzerland (SUI) | 1 | 1 | 2 | 4 |
| 5 | Belgium (BEL) | 1 | 1 | 0 | 2 |
| 6 | United States (USA) | 1 | 0 | 2 | 3 |
| 7 | Germany (GER) | 1 | 0 | 1 | 2 |
| 8 | Norway (NOR) | 1 | 0 | 0 | 1 |
| 9 | Great Britain (GBR) | 0 | 3 | 0 | 3 |
| 9 | Spain (ESP) | 0 | 3 | 0 | 3 |
| 11 | Poland (POL) | 0 | 1 | 2 | 3 |
| 12 | Czech Republic (CZE) | 0 | 1 | 1 | 2 |
| 13 | Austria (AUT) | 0 | 1 | 0 | 1 |
| 13 | Russia (RUS) | 0 | 1 | 0 | 1 |
| 15 | Ecuador (ECU) | 0 | 0 | 1 | 1 |
| 15 | Italy (ITA) | 0 | 0 | 1 | 1 |
| 15 | Slovakia (SVK) | 0 | 0 | 1 | 1 |
| Totals (17 entries) | | 19 | 19 | 19 | 57 |

== See also ==
- 2002 UCI Mountain Bike World Cup
- UCI Mountain Bike Marathon World Championships
