= Liu Ying (cyclist) =

Chinese cross-country mountain bike racer

Liu Ying (born 23 November 1985 in Jiangsu) is a female Chinese Olympic cross-country mountain bike racer, who competed for Team China at the 2008 Summer Olympics in where she finished 12th in the cross-country event.

== Sports career ==
- 1998 Lianyungang Cycling Team;
- 2004 Jiangsu Provincial Team;
- 2005 National Team

== Major performances ==
- 2007 National Championships - 1st mountain bike;
- 2007 Asian Championships - 1st mountain bike;
- 2007 Mountain Bike World Championships - 1st U23;
- 2007 World Cup - 1st mountain bike
