= Vincent Hermance =

French cyclist

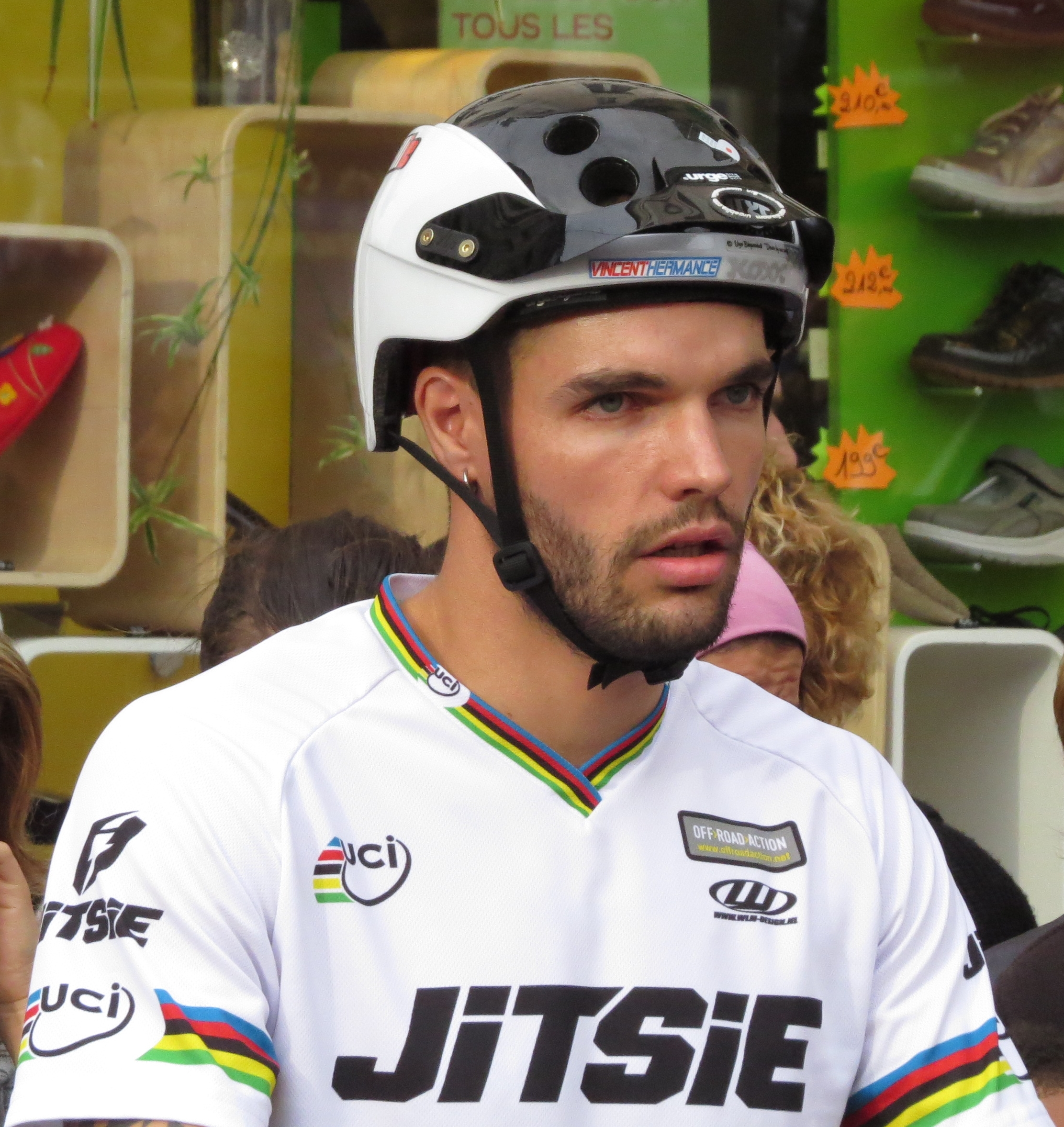

Personal information
- Full name: Vincent Hermance
- Born: 1 August 1984 (age 42) Meaux, France
- Height: 182 cm (6 ft 0 in)
- Weight: 77 kg (170 lb)

Cycling career
- Sport: Cycling
- Current team: Hashtagg
- Discipline: Trials

Major wins
- World Championships 26-inch trials (2007, 2013, 2015)
Medal record
Representing France
Men's mountain bike trials
World Championships
Gold medal – first place	2001 Vail	Junior trials, 26"
Gold medal – first place	2005 Livigno	Trials, team
Gold medal – first place	2007 Fort William	Trials, 26"
Gold medal – first place	2011 Champéry	Trials, team
Gold medal – first place	2013 Pietermaritzburg	Trials, 26"
Gold medal – first place	2015 Vallnord	Trials, 26"
Gold medal – first place	2015 Vallnord	Trials, team
Gold medal – first place	2016 Val di Sole	Trials, team
Silver medal – second place	2004 Les Gets	Trials, 26"
Silver medal – second place	2005 Livigno	Trials, 26"
Silver medal – second place	2006 Rotorua	Trials, 26"
Silver medal – second place	2007 Fort William	Trials, team
Silver medal – second place	2008 Val di Sole	Trials, 26"
Silver medal – second place	2008 Val di Sole	Trials, team
Silver medal – second place	2012 Leogang-Saalfelden	Trials, team
Silver medal – second place	2014 Lillehammer-Hafjell	Trials, team
Bronze medal – third place	2003 Lugano	Trials, 20"
Bronze medal – third place	2009 Canberra	Trials, 26"
Bronze medal – third place	2011 Champéry	Trials, 26"
Bronze medal – third place	2012 Leogang-Saalfelden	Trials, 20"

Vincent Hermance (born 1 August 1984 in Meaux, France) is a French mountain bike trials cyclist. He specialises in 26-inch trials.

Hermance was UCI junior world champion in 2001 and UCI elite world champion in 2007, 2013, and 2015 in the 26-inch category. Competing with the French team he won the team trials world championship in 2005, 2011, 2015, and 2016. He also has two bronze medals in world championships in the elite 20-inch category.

He is the son of Dominique Hermance, founder of the trials-bike brands Koxx and Hashtagg.
