= Kenny Belaey =

Belgian cyclist (born 1983)

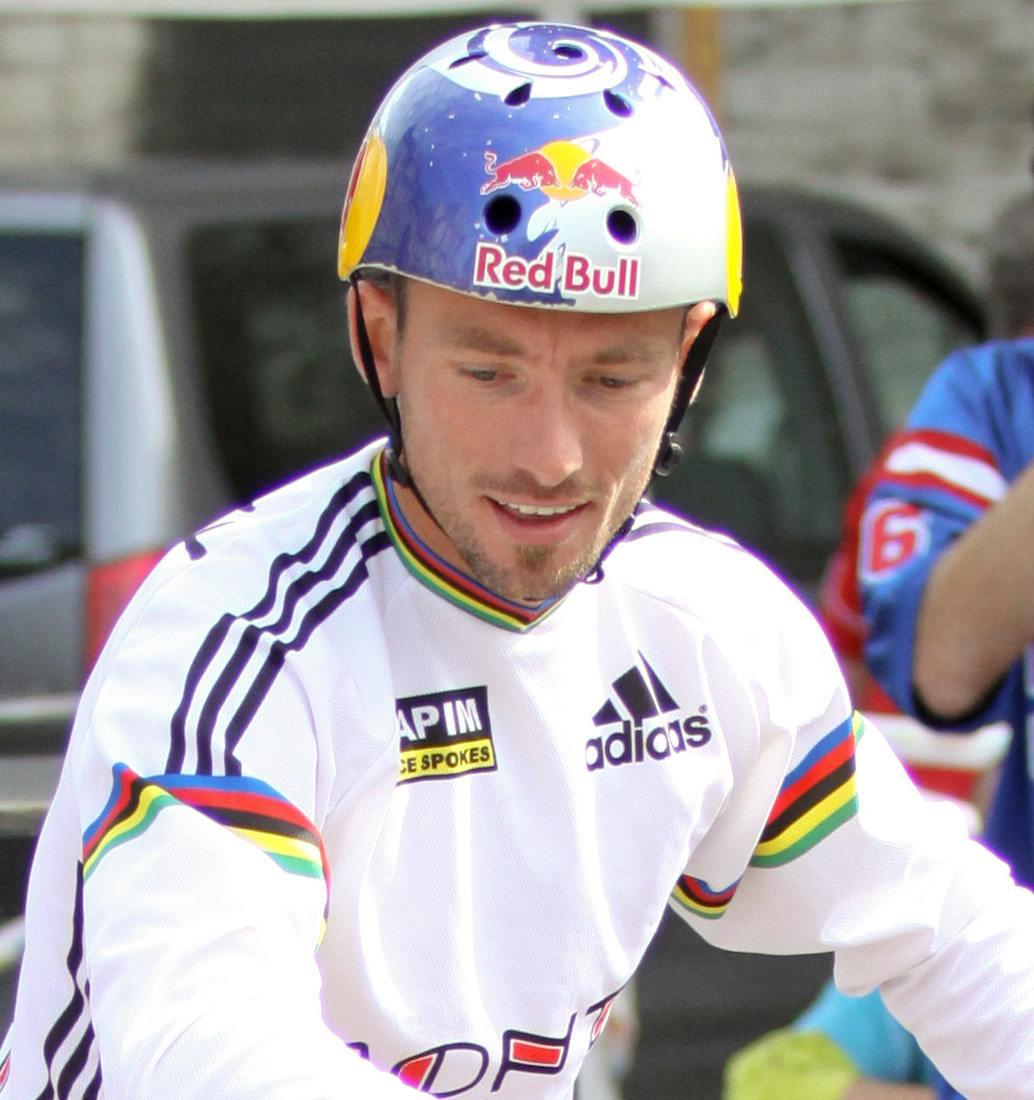
- Belaey at Sportief Gent 2010

Personal information
- Full name: Kenny Guillaume Leda Belaey
- Nickname: The Magician
- Born: 26 January 1983 (age 43) Eeklo, Belgium
- Height: 1.81 m (5 ft 11 in)
- Weight: 79 kg (174 lb)

Cycling career
- Sport: Cycling
- Discipline: Mountain bike — Trials
- Role: Rider

Major wins
- UCI Trials World Champion — Men's Elite 26" (2002, 2005, 2006, 2010); UCI Trials World Champion — Men's Junior 20" (2000, 2001); UCI Trials World Champion — Men's Junior 26" (2000); UCI Trials World Champion — Men's Cadet 20" (1998)
Medal record
Mountain bike racing
Representing Belgium
UCI World Championships
Silver medal – second place	2012 Leogang and Saalfelden	Trials Men's Elite 26"
Silver medal – second place	2011 Champéry	Trials Men's Elite 26"
Gold medal – first place	2010 Mont-Ste-Anne	Trials Men's Elite 26"
Silver medal – second place	2009 Canberra	Trials Men's Elite 26"
Bronze medal – third place	2007 Fort William	Trials Men's Elite 26"
Gold medal – first place	2006 Rotorua	Trials Men's Elite 26"
Gold medal – first place	2005 Livigno	Trials Men's Elite 26"
Bronze medal – third place	2003 Lugano	Trials Men's Elite 26"
Gold medal – first place	2002 Kaprun/Zell a.See	Trials Men's Elite 26"
Gold medal – first place	2001 Vail / Beaver Creek	Trials Men's Junior 20"
Bronze medal – third place	2001 Vail / Beaver Creek	Trials Men's Junior 26"
Gold medal – first place	2000 Sierra Nevada	Trials Men's Junior 20"
Gold medal – first place	2000 Sierra Nevada	Trials Men's Junior 26"
Silver medal – second place	1999 Avoriaz	Trials Men's Junior 20"
Gold medal – first place	1998 Cartagena	Trials Men's Cadet 20"
BIU World Championships
Gold medal – first place	1999 season	Trials Men's Cadet

Kenny Belaey (born 26 January 1983 in Eeklo) is a Belgian mountain bike trials cyclist. He holds the UCI record of most podium spots at a world championship in the discipline of trial.

In recent years, Kenny has performed at cycling shows internationally and made appearances on television. He has also worked with photographers and journalists on features for cycling and sports magazines, alongside promotional activities for his sponsors.

== History ==
Belaey started in competition in 1992, inspired by his dad Ronny who was a motorcycle trialist. Hard work, athletic skills and fierce natural talent started to pay off soon. In 1996 he made his international debut in Spa-Francorchamps coming home fifth. Another two year later (1998) he claimed his first cadet world champion title. He wrote history in 2000 when he won the Junior Worlds in both 20” and 26”. Kenny continued to make a name for himself by dominating the 2005 and 2006 seasons, taking back-to-back world titles. He even made it a "triple" in 2005 racking up the World, European and World Cup overall titles. His ability to clear seemingly impossible obstacles and pull off amazing saves has earned him the nickname "The Magician".

== Titles ==
- UCI Cadet World Champion: 1998
- BIU Cadet World Champion: 1999
- Junior World Champion: 2000 (20" & 26" on same day), 2001
- Junior European Champion: 2000
- Elite World Champion: 2002, 2005, 2006, 2010
- Elite World Cup Winner: 2000, 2003, 2004, 2005, 2007, 2009
- Elite European Champion: 2005, 2006, 2011

== For the sport ==
Early on in 2009 Belaey set off on a five-week global trek crossing from Spain to England, Cleveland, California and Hawaii in the US. His encounters with biking legends, places, and athletes influencing the sport will be the backbone of a forthcoming TV series to be aired on the ‘Extreme Sports Channel’. Featured sporting celebrities include: Toni Bou (moto trials star), Dave Mirra (X-games BMX legend), Hans Rey and Ot Pi (bike trials pioneers), Danny Macaskill (Scottish street riding ace).

In 2011 the 4th and 5th episode will go on air for Belgian TV and the Extreme Sportschannel, showcasing his adventures during a road trip through South Africa.

In 2011 he decided to organize the UCI world cup rounds in Belgium, having the biggest media outcome in the history of the sport with live international TV coverage.

In the years that followed he spent a lot of time in the USA and in 2018 he finds womans shred, a female focused MTB event. A year later in 2019 he finds the Bentonville Bike Fest, an all inclusive bike festival with close to 20.000 visitors. A festival that champions the MTB capital of the world in Northwest Arkansas.

== Personal life ==
Belaey enjoys playing the guitar, listening to music, watching movies, fishing, and snowboarding. He is married to Barbara Matthys and together they have a son named Cesar Belaey.
