= UCI Mountain Bike & Trials World Championships – Men's four-cross =

The men's four-cross is an event at the annual UCI Mountain Bike & Trials World Championships. It has been held since the 2002 championships, having replaced the dual event. In 2014 and 2015 the four-cross events were held separately from the UCI Mountain Bike & Trials World Championships as the UCI Four-cross World Championships.

Championships	Gold	Silver	Bronze
2002 Kaprun	Brian Lopes; United States	Cédric Gracia; France	Eric Carter; United States
2003 Lugano	Michal Prokop; Czech Republic	Eric Carter; United States	Brian Lopes; United States
2004 Les Gets	Eric Carter; United States	Mickael Deldycke; France	Michal Prokop; Czech Republic
2005 Livigno	Brian Lopes; United States	Jared Graves; Australia	Mickael Deldycke; France
2006 Rotorua	Michal Prokop; Czech Republic	Roger Rinderknecht; Switzerland	Guido Tschugg; Germany
2007 Fort William	Brian Lopes; United States	Romain Saladini; France	Jurg Meijer; Netherlands
2008 Val Di Sole	Rafael Álvarez; Spain	Roger Rinderknecht; Switzerland	Mickael Deldycke; France
2009 Canberra	Jared Graves; Australia	Romain Saladini; France	Jakub Riha; Czech Republic
2010 Mont-Sainte-Anne	Tomáš Slavík; Czech Republic	Jared Graves; Australia	Michal Prokop; Czech Republic
2011 Champéry	Michal Prokop; Czech Republic	Roger Rinderknecht; Switzerland	Joost Wichman; Netherlands
2012 Leogang-Saalfelden	Roger Rinderknecht; Switzerland	Michael Měchura; Czech Republic	Tomáš Slavík; Czech Republic
2013 Leogang-Saalfelden	Joost Wichman; Netherlands	Michael Měchura; Czech Republic	Quentin Derbier; France
2014 Leogang-Saalfelden	Tomáš Slavík; Czech Republic	Michael Měchura; Czech Republic	Simon Waldburger; Switzerland
2015 Val Di Sole	Aiko Göhler; Germany	Luke Cryer; Great Britain	Benedikt Last; Germany
2016 Val Di Sole	Mitja Ergaver; Slovenia	Hannes Slavik; Austria	Luke Cryer; Great Britain
2017 Val Di Sole	Felix Beckeman; Sweden	Quentin Derbier; France	Giovanni Pozzoni; Italy
2018 Val Di Sole	Quentin Derbier; France	Tomáš Slavík; Czech Republic	Mikuláš Nevrkla; Czech Republic
2019 Val Di Sole	Romain Mayet; France	Elliott Heap; Great Britain	Felix Beckeman; Sweden

== Medal table ==
Rank	Nation	Gold	Silver	Bronze	Total
1	Czech Republic	5	4	5	14
2	United States	4	1	2	7
3	France	2	5	3	10
4	Switzerland	1	3	1	5
5	Australia	1	2	0	3
6	Germany	1	0	2	3
6	Netherlands	1	0	2	3
8	Sweden	1	0	1	2
9	Slovenia	1	0	0	1
9	Spain	1	0	0	1
11	Great Britain	0	2	1	3
12	Austria	0	1	0	1
13	Italy	0	0	1	1
Totals (13 entries)		18	18	18	54
