= José Miguel Echavarri =

Spanish cyclist

Personal information
- Full name: José Miguel Echavarri García
- Born: 10 October 1947 (age 79) Abárzuza, Spain

Cycling career
- Sport: Cycling
- Current team: Movistar Team
- Discipline: Road
- Role: Directeur sportif Rider

Professional teams
- 1969–1970: Bic
- 1971: FC Porto–Antracol

Managerial team
- 1980–2008: Reynolds

José Miguel Echavarri García (born 10 October 1947 in Abárzuza) is a Spanish former racing cyclist who was the team manager for Movistar Team from its inception in 1980 as Reynolds until 2008 as Caisse d'Epargne.

== Major results ==
1970
8th Clásica de Sabiñánigo
10th Grand Prix Navarre
