= Troy Brosnan =

Australian mountain bike cyclist (born 1993)

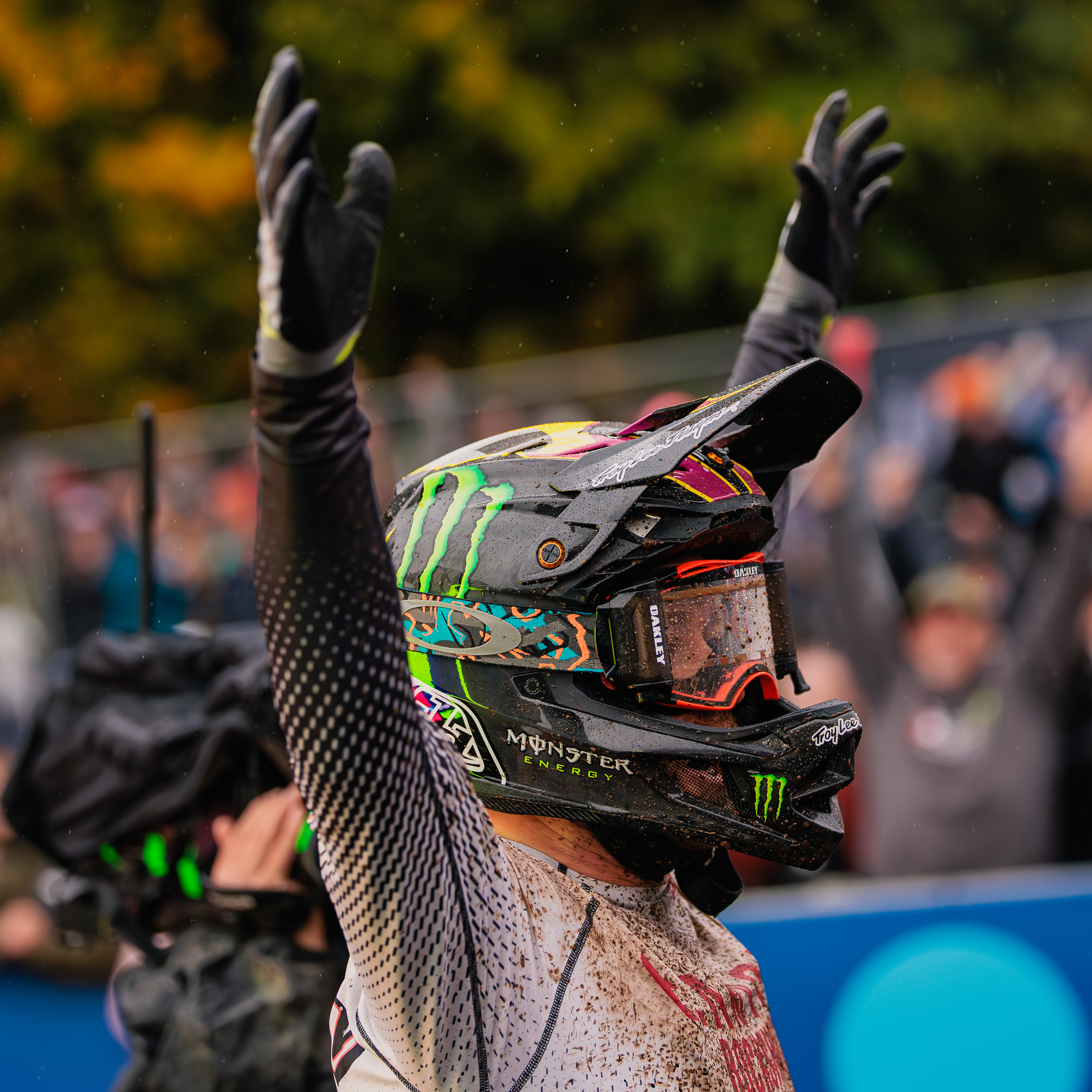

Personal information
- Full name: Troy Brosnan
- Born: 13 July 1993 (age 33) Adelaide, South Australia

Cycling career
- Sport: Cycling
- Current team: Canyon Factory Downhill Team
Medal record
Representing Australia
Men's mountain bike racing
World Championships
Gold medal – first place	2010	Junior downhill
Gold medal – first place	2011	Junior downhill
Bronze medal – third place	2014	Downhill
Bronze medal – third place	2015	Downhill
Bronze medal – third place	2016	Downhill
Silver medal – second place	2016	Downhill
Bronze medal – third place	2018	Downhill
Silver medal – second place	2019	Downhill
Bronze medal – third place	2021	Downhill

Troy Brosnan (born 13 July 1993 in Adelaide, South Australia) is an Australian professional racing cyclist specialising in downhill mountain bike racing. As a junior, he was twice world champion, once Oceanian champion, and once Australian national champion in the downhill. In the elite category he has twice been third overall in the world cup and is an eight-time Australian champion.

== Career ==
Brosnan was junior downhill world champion in 2010 and 2011. He won the overall junior world cup in 2010 and 2011 and was Australian national downhill champion in 2011. He was junior continental champion of Oceania in 2011.

Brosnan has competed in the elite category since 2012. He was third overall in the downhill world cup in 2014 and won the third round of the series in Fort William, Scotland. He won the bronze medal in the downhill at the 2014 world championships in Hafjell, Norway. He was again third overall in the world cup series in 2015. Once again, he was third overall in the 2016 Downhill World Cup Series. In 2017 he won the fourth round of the 2017 Downhill World Cup in Vallnord, Andorra, and currently sits second in the overall series after the fifth round.

He won the first round of the 2021 Downhill World Cup season in Léogang, Austria.

Brosnan was Australian national downhill champion in 2012, 2014, 2015, 2016 and 2017.
