= UCI Mountain Bike & Trials World Championships – Men's dual =

The men's dual was an event at the annual UCI Mountain Bike & Trials World Championships. It was held between 2000 and 2001, being replaced by the four-cross event in 2002. Brian Lopes of the United States was the most successful rider with one gold medal and one silver medal.

== Medalists ==
Championships	Gold	Silver	Bronze
2000 Sierra Nevada	Wade Bootes; Australia	Brian Lopes; United States	Mickael Deldycke; France
2001 Vail	Brian Lopes; United States	Cedric Gracia; France	Wade Bootes; Australia
