= UCI Trials World Championships – Men's trials, 20 inch =

The men's trials, 20 inch is a trials event at the annual UCI Urban Cycling World Championships. It has been a UCI World Championship event since 1986. From 1986 to 1994 there was no separate 26-inch category in the world championships.

From 1986 to 1999, the UCI world championships in trials were run as the UCI Trials World Championships. From 2000 to 2016, the world championships in trials were held alongside other mountain-biking disciplines as the UCI Mountain Bike & Trials World Championships. Beginning in 2017, the UCI World Championships in trials are being run as part of the UCI Urban Cycling World Championships.

== Medalists ==
Championships	Gold	Silver	Bronze
1986	Daniel Crosset; Belgium	Hansjörg Rey; Switzerland	Bruno Evard; Belgium
1987	Daniel Crosset; Belgium	Bruno Evard; Belgium	Javier Calleja; Spain
1988	Josep Ribera; Spain	Ot Pi; Spain	Christoph Winand; Belgium
1989	Ot Pi; Spain	Gerd Merkel; Germany	Josef Dressler; Czechoslovakia
1990	Ot Pi; Spain	Josef Dressler; Czechoslovakia	Christoph Winand; Belgium
1991	Ot Pi; Spain	Josef Dressler; Czechoslovakia	Libor Karas; Czechoslovakia
1992 Lorca	Alfonso Méndez; Spain	Marc Terricabres; Spain	Javier Calleja; Spain
1993 Val d'Isère	Joël Gavillet; Switzerland	Stefan Schlie; Germany	Alfonso Méndez; Spain
1994 Zafra	Jesús Hurtado; Spain	Alfonso Méndez; Spain	Stephan Schlie; Germany
1995 Grossheubach am Main	Jesús Hurtado; Spain	Christopher Noelle; Germany	Gerd Merkel; Germany
1996 Zuoz	Elias Bonet; Spain	Alfonso Méndez; Spain	Marc Verdaguer; Spain
1997 Avoriaz	Michael Mesick; Germany	Alfonso Méndez; Spain	Daniel Cegarra; Spain
1998 Cartagena	Juan Pedro García; Spain	Daniel Cegarra; Spain	Juan Antonio Linares; Spain
1999 Avoriaz	Marco Hösel; Germany	Juan Antonio Linares; Spain	Miłosz Grajewski; Poland
2000 Sierra Nevada	Daniel Comas; Spain	Marco Hösel; Germany	Juan Antonio Linares; Spain
2001 Vail	Rafał Kumorowski; Poland	Marco Hösel; Germany	Benito Ros; Spain
2002 Kaprun	Marco Hösel; Germany	Juan Antonio Linares; Spain	Peter Barták; Slovakia
2003 Lugano	Benito Ros; Spain	Marco Hösel; Germany	Vincent Hermance; France
2004 Les Gets	Benito Ros; Spain	Marco Hösel; Germany	Rafał Kumorowski; Poland
2005 Livigno	Benito Ros; Spain	Marco Hösel; Germany	Juan Daniel de la Peña; Spain
2006 Rotorua	Marco Hösel; Germany	Carles Díaz; Spain	Benito Ros; Spain
2007 Fort William	Benito Ros; Spain	Carles Díaz; Spain	Daniel Comas; Spain
2008 Val di Sole	Benito Ros; Spain	Rafał Kumorowski; Poland	Sebastian Hoffmann; Germany
2009 Canberra	Benito Ros; Spain	Rafał Kumorowski; Poland	Loris Braun; Switzerland
2010 Mont-Sainte-Anne	Benito Ros; Spain	Abel Mustieles; Spain	Rick Koekoek; Netherlands
2011 Champery	Benito Ros; Spain	Abel Mustieles; Spain	Gilles Coustellier; France
2012 Leogang-Saalfelden	Benito Ros; Spain	Abel Mustieles; Spain	Vincent Hermance; France
2013 Pietermaritzburg	Abel Mustieles; Spain	Aurélien Fontenoy; France	Benito Ros; Spain
2014 Lillehammer-Hafjell	Benito Ros; Spain	Abel Mustieles; Spain	Raphael Pils; Germany
2015 Vallnord	Abel Mustieles; Spain	Lucien Leiser; Switzerland	Benito Ros; Spain
2016 Val di Sole	Abel Mustieles; Spain	Benito Ros; Spain	Ion Areitio; Spain
2017 Chengdu	Abel Mustieles; Spain	Dominik Oswald; Germany	Ion Areitio; Spain
2018 Chengdu	Thomas Pechhacker; Austria	Ion Areitio; Spain	Dominik Oswald; Germany
2019 Chengdu	Dominik Oswald; Germany	Borja Conejos; Spain	Ion Areitio; Spain
2021 Vic	Borja Conejos; Spain	Alejandro Montalvo; Spain	Eloi Palau; Spain
2022 Abu Dhabi	Eloi Palau; Spain	Alejandro Montalvo; Spain	Borja Conejos; Spain
2023 Glasgow	Alejandro Montalvo; Spain	Borja Conejos; Spain	Charlie Rolls; Great Britain
2024 Abu Dhabi	Alejandro Montalvo; Spain	Borja Conejos; Spain	Eloi Palau; Spain
2025 Riyadh	Alejandro Montalvo; Spain	Eloi Palau; Spain	Niilo Stenvall; Finland

== Medal table ==
Rank	Nation	Gold	Silver	Bronze	Total
1	Spain	29	22	19	70
2	Germany	5	9	5	19
3	Belgium	2	1	3	6
4	Poland	1	2	2	5
5	Switzerland	1	2	1	4
6	Austria	1	0	0	1
7	Czechoslovakia	0	2	2	4
8	France	0	1	3	4
9	Finland	0	0	1	1
9	Great Britain	0	0	1	1
9	Netherlands	0	0	1	1
9	Slovakia	0	0	1	1
Totals (12 entries)		39	39	39	117
