= Benito Ros =

Spanish cyclist

Personal information
- Full name: Benito Ros Charral
- Born: 2 May 1981 (age 45) Abárzuza, Spain

Cycling career
- Sport: Cycling
- Discipline: Trials
- Role: Rider
Medal record
Representing Spain
Men's mountain bike trials
World Championships
Gold medal – first place	2003 Lugano	Trials, 20"
Gold medal – first place	2004 Les Gets	Trials, 20"
Gold medal – first place	2005 Livigno	Trials, 20"
Gold medal – first place	2007 Fort William	Trials, 20"
Gold medal – first place	2008 Val di Sole	Trials, 20"
Gold medal – first place	2009 Canberra	Trials, 20"
Gold medal – first place	2010 Mont-Sainte-Anne	Trials, 20"
Gold medal – first place	2014 Lillehammer-Hafjell	Trials, 20"
Gold medal – first place	2004 Les Gets	Trials, team
Gold medal – first place	2007 Fort William	Trials, team
Gold medal – first place	2008 Val di Sole	Trials, team
Gold medal – first place	2009 Canberra	Trials, team
Gold medal – first place	2012 Leogang-Saalfelden	Trials, team
Gold medal – first place	2013 Pietermaritzburg	Trials, team
Silver medal – second place	2016 Val di Sole	Trials, 20"
Silver medal – second place	2010 Mont-Sainte-Anne	Trials, 26"
Silver medal – second place	2005 Livigno	Trials, team
Bronze medal – third place	2005 Livigno	Trials, 26"
Bronze medal – third place	2001 Vail	Trials, 20"
Bronze medal – third place	2006 Rotorua	Trials, 20"
Bronze medal – third place	2013 Pietermaritzburg	Trials, 20"
Bronze medal – third place	2015 Vallnord	Trials, 20"
Bronze medal – third place	1998 Cartagena	Junior trials, 20"
Bronze medal – third place	2006 Rotorua	Trials, team

Benito Ros Charral (born 2 May 1981 in Abárzuza) is a Spanish mountain bike trials cyclist. He won the 20-inch trials at the world championships eight times between 2003 and 2014, as well as seven team trials world championships.

In 2011, after the world championship he won, he tested positive for prednisolone, a corticosteroid. He was suspended for two years, from September 2011 to September 2013, and was stripped of his 2011 and 2012 world titles.
