= 2010 UCI Mountain Bike & Trials World Championships =

Mountain biking event in Canada

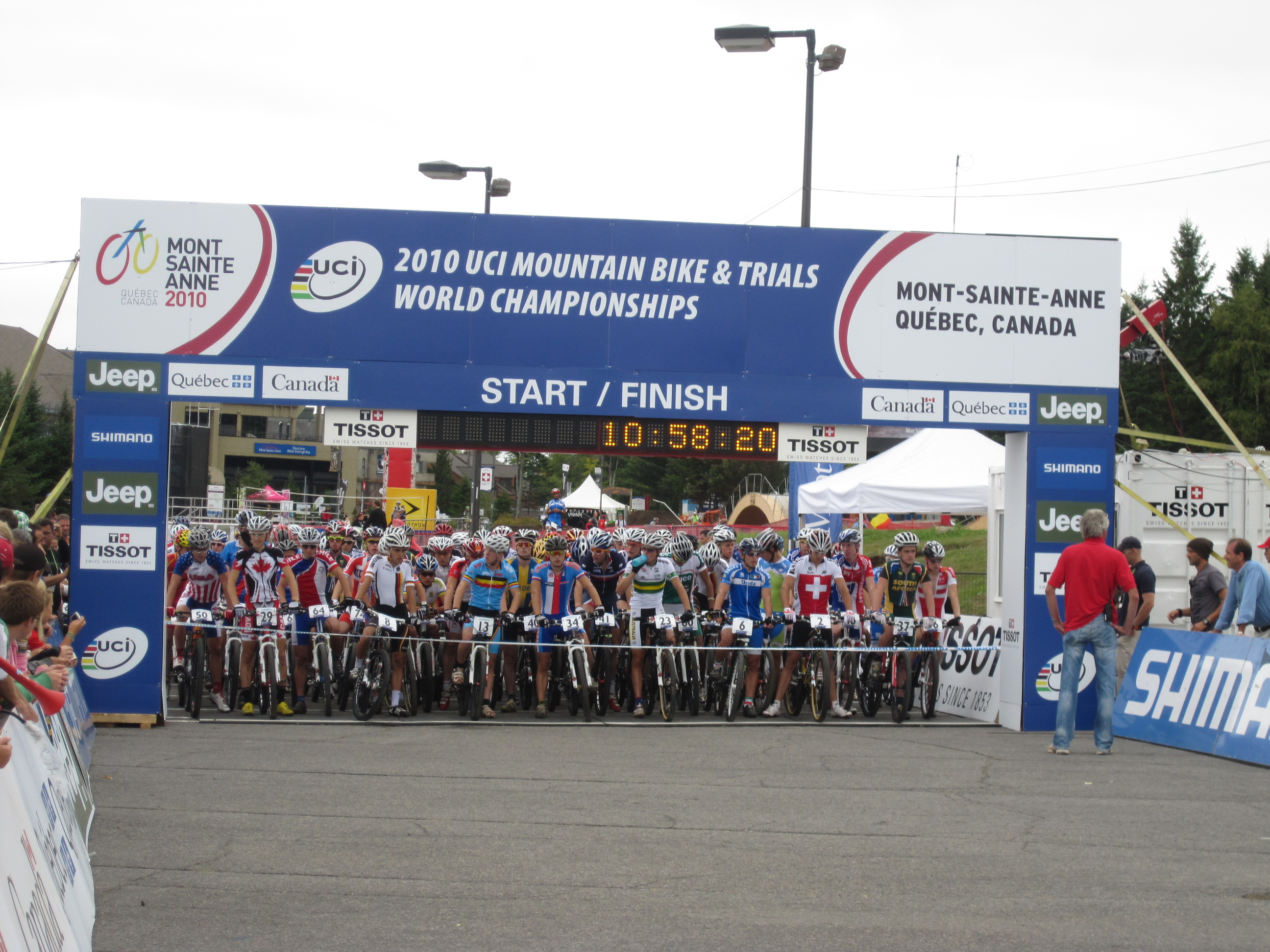
- Start of the Junior Men's cross-country at the 2010 UCI Mountain Bike & Trials World Championships in Mont-Sainte-Anne, Quebec, Canada
- Venue: Mont-Sainte-Anne, QC, Canada
- Date(s): 1–5 September 2010
- Events: MTB: 13; Trials: 6

The 2010 UCI Mountain Bike & Trials World Championships was the 21st edition of the UCI Mountain Bike & Trials World Championships and was held in Mont-Sainte-Anne, Quebec, Canada from 1 to 5 September 2010.

== Medal summary ==
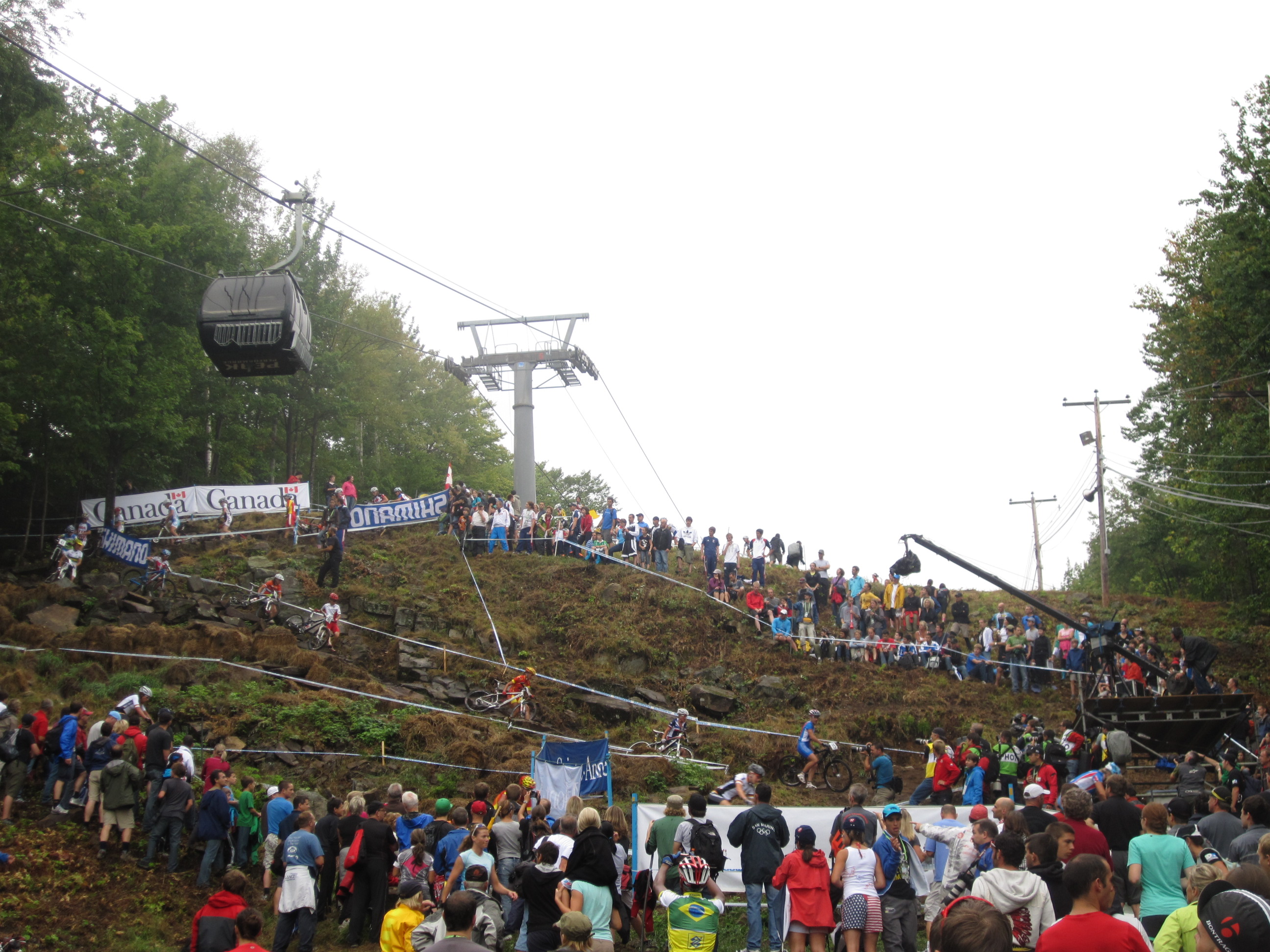
Women's cross-country

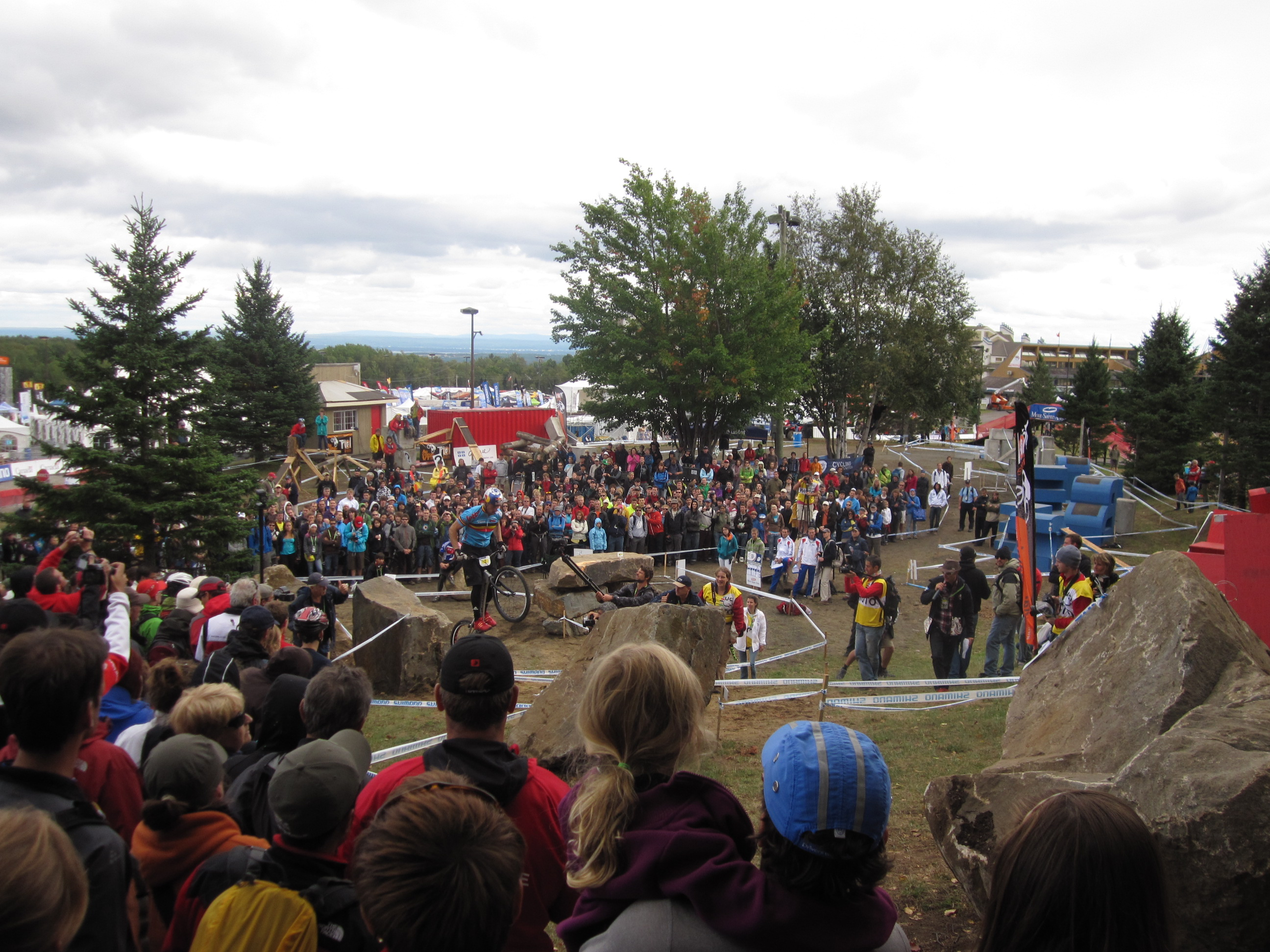
Men's 26" trials final

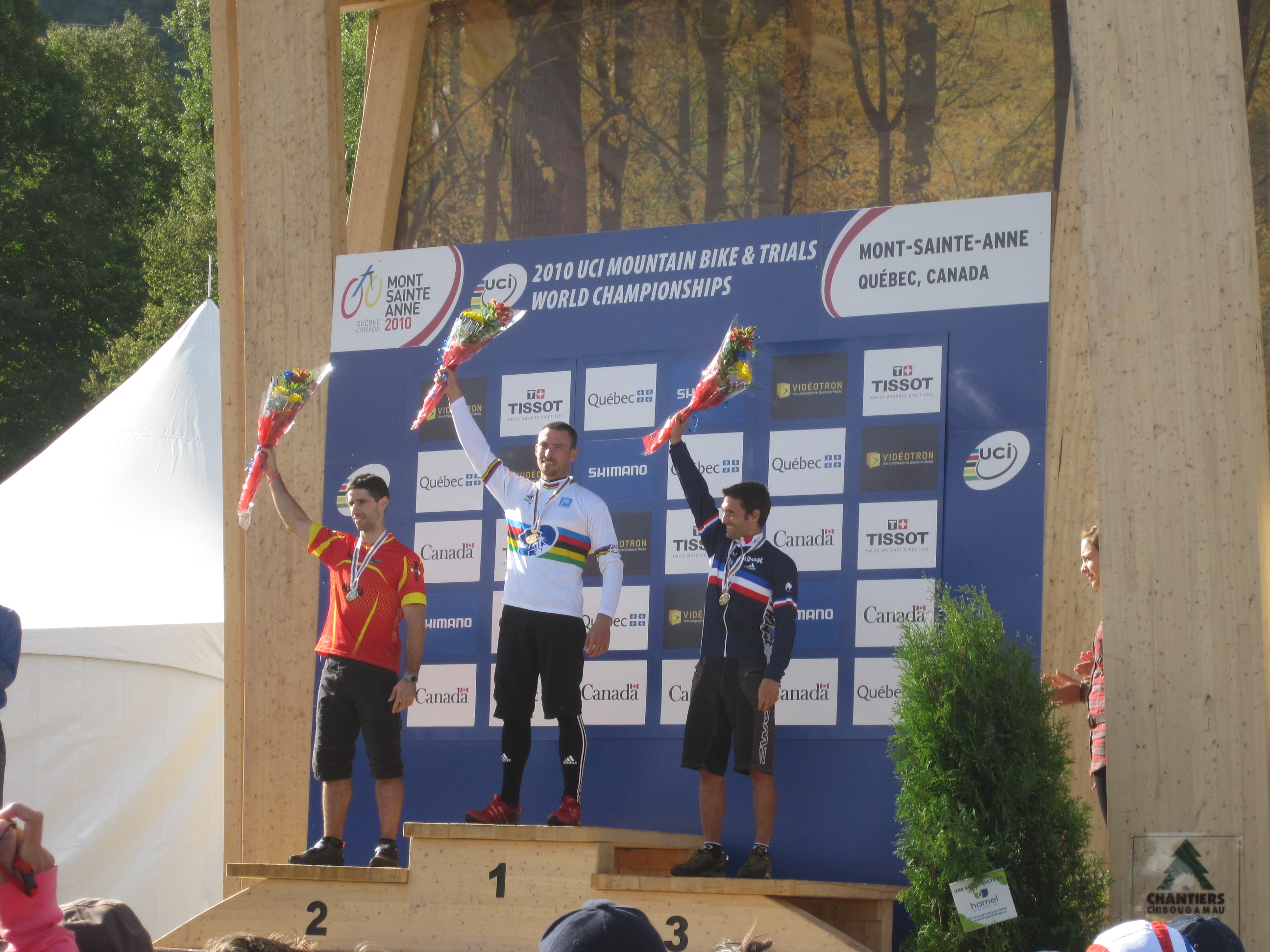
Men's 26" trials podium

=== Men's events ===
Event	Gold	Silver	Bronze
Cross-country	José Antonio Hermida (ESP)	Jaroslav Kulhavý (CZE)	Burry Stander (RSA)
Under 23 cross-country	Mathias Flückiger (SUI)	Thomas Litscher (SUI)	Patrik Gallati (SUI)
Junior cross-country	Michiel van der Heijden (NED)	Julien Trarieux (FRA)	Julian Schelb (GER)
Downhill	Sam Hill (AUS)	Steve Smith (CAN)	Greg Minnaar (RSA)
Junior downhill	Troy Brosnan (AUS)	Neko Mulally (USA)	Lewis Buchanan (GBR)
Four-cross	Tomas Slavik (CZE)	Jared Graves (AUS)	Michal Prokop (CZE)
Trials, 20 inch	Benito Ros Charral (ESP)	Abel Mustieles Garcia (ESP)	Rick Koekoek (NED)
Trials, 26 inch	Kenny Belaey (BEL)	Benito Ros Charral (ESP)	Marc Caisso (FRA)
Junior trials, 20 inch	Ion Areitio (ESP)	Raphael Pils (GER)	Marius Merger (FRA)
Junior trials, 26 inch	Ion Areitio (ESP)	David Bonzon (SUI)	Maxime Tolu (FRA)

=== Women's events ===
Event	Gold	Silver	Bronze
Cross-country	Maja Włoszczowska (POL)	Irina Kalentieva (RUS)	Willow Koerber (USA)
Under 23 cross-country	Alexandra Engen (SWE)	Annie Last (GBR)	Paula Gorycka (POL)
Junior cross-country	Pauline Ferrand-Prévot (FRA)	Yana Belomoyna (UKR)	Helen Grobert (GER)
Downhill	Tracy Moseley (GBR)	Sabrina Jonnier (FRA)	Emmeline Ragot (FRA)
Junior downhill	Lauren Rosser (CAN)	Fanny Lombard (FRA)	Julie Berteaux (FRA)
Four-cross	Caroline Buchanan (AUS)	Jana Horáková (CZE)	Romana Labounková (CZE)
Trials	Gemma Abant Condal (ESP)	Karin Moor (SUI)	Tatiana Janicková (SVK)

=== Team events ===
Event	Gold	Silver	Bronze
Cross-country	Switzerland; Thomas Litscher; Roger Walder; Katrin Leumann; Ralph Naef	Germany; Manuel Fumic; Julian Schelb; Sabine Spitz; Marcel Fleschhut	Czech Republic; Jaroslav Kulhavý; Ondrej Cink; Kateřina Nash; Tomas Paprstka
Trials	Spain	France	Germany

=== Medal table ===
Rank	Nation	Gold	Silver	Bronze	Total
1	Spain (ESP)	6	2	0	8
2	Australia (AUS)	3	1	0	4
3	Switzerland (SUI)	2	3	1	6
4	France (FRA)	1	4	5	10
5	Czech Republic (CZE)	1	2	3	6
6	Canada (CAN)	1	1	1	3
6	Great Britain (GBR)	1	1	1	3
8	Netherlands (NED)	1	0	1	2
8	Poland (POL)	1	0	1	2
10	Belgium (BEL)	1	0	0	1
10	Sweden (SWE)	1	0	0	1
12	Germany (GER)	0	2	3	5
13	United States (USA)	0	1	1	2
14	Russia (RUS)	0	1	0	1
14	Ukraine (UKR)	0	1	0	1
16	South Africa (RSA)	0	0	2	2
17	Slovakia (SVK)	0	0	1	1
Totals (17 entries)		19	19	20	58

== Results ==
=== Men ===
Cross-country

Downhill

=== Women ===
Cross-country

Downhill

== See also ==
- 2010 UCI Mountain Bike World Cup
