= Abel Mustieles =

Spanish cyclist

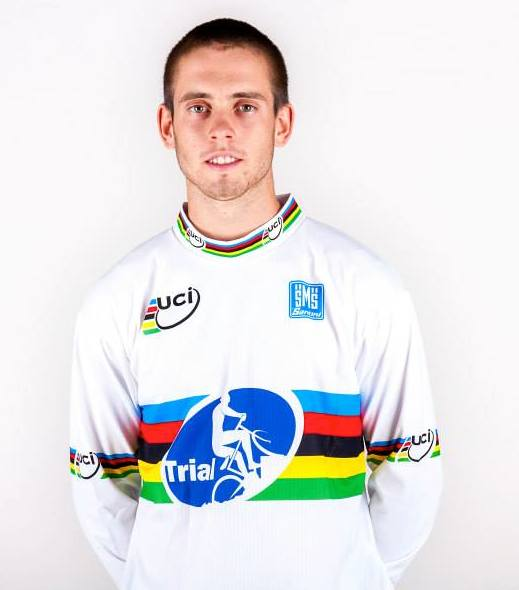

Personal information
- Full name: Abel Mustieles García
- Born: 26 August 1991 (age 35) Caspe, Spain

Cycling career
- Sport: Cycling
- Discipline: Trials
- Role: Rider
- Rider type: 20 inch

Major wins
- World Championships 20-inch trials (2013, 2015, 2016, 2017)
Medal record
Representing Spain
Men's mountain bike trials
World Championships
Gold medal – first place	2008 Val di Sole	Junior trials, 20"
Gold medal – first place	2008 Val di Sole	Trials, team
Gold medal – first place	2009 Canberra	Junior trials, 20"
Gold medal – first place	2009 Canberra	Trials, team
Gold medal – first place	2013 Pietermaritzburg	Trials, 20"
Gold medal – first place	2015 Vallnord	Trials, 20"
Gold medal – first place	2016 Val di Sole	Trials, 20"
Gold medal – first place	2017 Chengdu	Trials, 20"
Gold medal – first place	2010 Mont-Sainte-Anne	Trials, team
Silver medal – second place	2010 Mont-Sainte-Anne	Trials, 20"
Silver medal – second place	2011 Champéry	Trials, 20"
Silver medal – second place	2012 Leogang-Saalfelden	Trials, 20"
Silver medal – second place	2014 Lillehammer-Hafjell	Trials, 20"
Silver medal – second place	2016 Val di Sole	Trials, team
Silver medal – second place	2009 Canberra	Junior trials, 26"
Bronze medal – third place	2014 Lillehammer-Hafjell	Trials, team

Abel Mustieles García (born 26 August 1991) is a Spanish mountain bike trials cyclist and a 4-time 20 inch world champion.

He created the brand Clean Trials in 2014.
