= Dan Atherton =

British racing cyclist (born 1982)

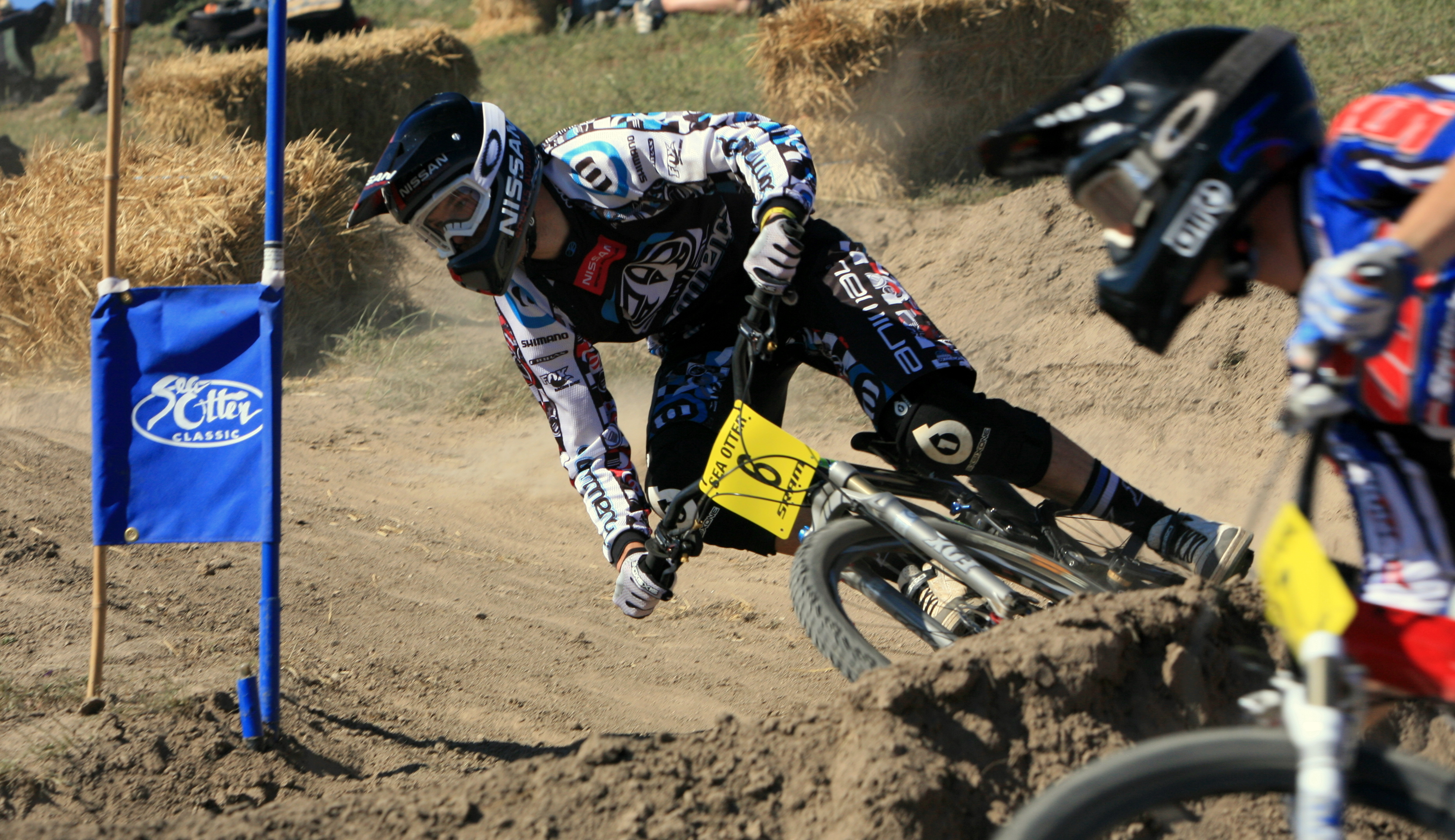
- Dan Atherton racing in the Dual Slalom at the 2009 Sea Otter Classic

Personal information
- Full name: Daniel Simon Atherton
- Nicknames: Dan, AFFY
- Born: 25 January 1982 (age 44) Salisbury, England, United Kingdom
- Height: 188 cm (6 ft 2 in)
- Weight: 83 kg (183 lb)

Cycling career
- Sport: Cycling
- Current team: Atherton Bikes
- Disciplines: BMX and MTB
- Role: Rider and course maker
- Rider type: Cross country and 4X

Professional teams
- 2007: ?
- 2010: Animal Commençal
- ?: Gt factory racing

Major wins
- (United Kingdom) GBR 4X National Champion (1 Wins); UCI 4X World Cup (1 Wins)

Daniel Simon Atherton, known as Dan Atherton (born 25 January 1982, near Salisbury), is a professional racing cyclist specialising in downhill, four cross and enduro-downhill mountain bike racing, and is a former national champion of Great Britain. He began riding BMX at the age of 15 and mountain biking a year later.

From 2007 till 2011, Atherton was one third of the Animal Commençal racing team, alongside brother Gee Atherton and sister Rachel Atherton.

He is now part of the Trek Factory Racing team with brother Gee, sister Rachel and old friend Marc Beaumont (Global Mountain Bike Network), and is primarily racing Enduro-downhill and occasional downhill races.

Dan Atherton, along with Rachel and Gee, was the star of the web series The Atherton Project, which followed their day-to-day lives.

In 2010 Atherton broke a vertebra in his neck whilst dirt jumping and has missed half of the season including the World Championships.

After the 2012 season's end, Atherton won the Asia Pacific Downhill Challenge in Indonesia.

== Palmarès ==
2004
1st 4X, British National Mountain Biking Championships

2003
2nd DH, UCI Mountain Bike World Cup, Round 3

2006
4th 4X, UCI Mountain Bike & Trials World Championships
4th DH, European Mountain Bike Championships
4th 4X, UCI Mountain Bike World Cup, Round 6

2007
10th DH, UCI Mountain Bike & Trials World Championships, Fort William
9th 4X, UCI Mountain Bike World Cup, Round 3, St Anne
3rd 4X, UCI Mountain Bike World Cup, Round 5, Maribor
2nd Irish National Championships, Rostrevor
2nd NPS DH, Round 3, Moelfre
6th NPS DH, Round 4, Caersws
6th NPS DH, Round 5, Innerliethan
4th Fat Face Night Race
4th Red Bull Metro Ride
3rd Urban Pro, Paris

2008
1st 4X, UCI Mountain Bike World Cup, Vallnord, Andorra
2nd Maxxis Cup, Gouveia, Portugal
