= 2012 UCI Mountain Bike & Trials World Championships =

- Venue: Leogang-Saalfelden, Austria
- Date: 31 August – 9 September 2012
- Events: 21 (15 mountain bike and 6 trials)

The 2012 UCI Mountain Bike & Trials World Championships was the 23rd edition of the UCI Mountain Bike & Trials World Championships and was held in Leogang and Saalfelden, Austria.

== Medal summary ==
Event	Gold	Silver	Bronze
Men's events
Cross-country	Nino Schurter; Switzerland	Lukas Flückiger; Switzerland	Mathias Flückiger; Switzerland
Under 23 cross-country	Ondrej Cink; Czech Republic	Michiel van der Heijden; Netherlands	Daniele Braidot; Italy
Junior cross-country	Anton Cooper; New Zealand	Victor Koretzky; France	Titouan Carod; France
Cross-country eliminator	Ralph Näf; Switzerland	Miha Halzer; Slovenia	Daniel Federspiel; Austria
Downhill	Greg Minnaar; South Africa	Gee Atherton; Great Britain	Steve Smith; Canada
Junior downhill	Loïc Bruni; France	Richie Rude; United States	Connor Fearon; Australia
Four-cross	Roger Rinderknecht; Switzerland	Michael Mechura; Czech Republic	Tomas Slavik; Czech Republic
Trials, 20 inch	Benito Ros; Spain	Abel Mustieles; Spain	Vincent Hermance; France
Trials, 26 inch	Gilles Coustellier; France	Aurélien Fontenoy; France	Kenny Belaey; Belgium
Junior Trials, 20 inch	Raphael Pils; Germany	Maxime Muffat; France	Lucien Leiser; Switzerland
Junior Trials, 26 inch	David Bonzon; Switzerland	Jack Carthy; Great Britain	Eloi Pare; Spain
Women's events
Cross-country	Julie Bresset; France	Gunn-Rita Dahle Flesjå; Norway	Georgia Gould; United States
Under 23 cross-country	Jolanda Neff; Switzerland	Yana Belomoyna; Ukraine	Paula Gorycka; Poland
Junior cross-country	Andrea Waldis; Switzerland	Sofia Wiedenroth; Germany	Lena Putz; Germany
Cross-country eliminator	Alexandra Engen; Sweden	Jolanda Neff; Switzerland	Aleksandra Dawidowicz; Poland
Downhill	Morgane Charre; France	Emmeline Ragot; France	Manon Carpenter; Great Britain
Junior downhill	Holly Feniak; Canada	Tahnée Seagrave; Great Britain	Danielle Beecroft; Australia
Four-cross	Anneke Beerten; Netherlands	Romana Labounková; Czech Republic	Céline Gros; France
Trials	Gemma Abant; Spain	Andrea Wesp; Germany	Tatiana Janickova; Slovakia
Team events
Cross-country	Italy: Marco Aurelio Fontana; Beltain Schmid; Eva Lechner; Luca Braidot	France: Jordan Sarrou; Victor Koretzky; Julie Bresset; Maxime Marotte	Germany: Markus Schulte-Luenzum; Martin Frey; Sabine Spitz; Manuel Fumic
Trials	Spain: Bernat Seuba; Benito Ros; Gemma Abant; Eloi Pare; Rafael Tibau	France: Maxime Muffat; Vincent Hermance; Marion Porchet; Clément Meot; Gilles Coustellier	Germany: Raphael Pils; Matthias Mrohs; Andrea Wesp; Jonathan Sandritter; Hannes Herrmann

== Medal table ==
Rank	Nation	Gold	Silver	Bronze	Total
1	Switzerland (SUI)	6	2	2	10
2	France (FRA)	4	6	3	13
3	Spain (ESP)	3	1	1	5
4	Germany (GER)	1	2	3	6
5	Czech Republic (CZE)	1	2	1	4
6	Netherlands (NED)	1	1	0	2
7	Canada (CAN)	1	0	1	2
7	Italy (ITA)	1	0	1	2
9	New Zealand (NZL)	1	0	0	1
9	South Africa (RSA)	1	0	0	1
9	Sweden (SWE)	1	0	0	1
12	Great Britain (GBR)	0	3	1	4
13	United States (USA)	0	1	1	2
14	Norway (NOR)	0	1	0	1
14	Slovenia (SLO)	0	1	0	1
14	Ukraine (UKR)	0	1	0	1
17	Australia (AUS)	0	0	2	2
17	Poland (POL)	0	0	2	2
19	Austria (AUT)	0	0	1	1
19	Belgium (BEL)	0	0	1	1
19	Slovakia (SVK)	0	0	1	1
Totals (21 entries)		21	21	21	63

== See also ==
- 2012 UCI Mountain Bike World Cup
