= Ondřej Cink =

Czech cyclist (born 1990)

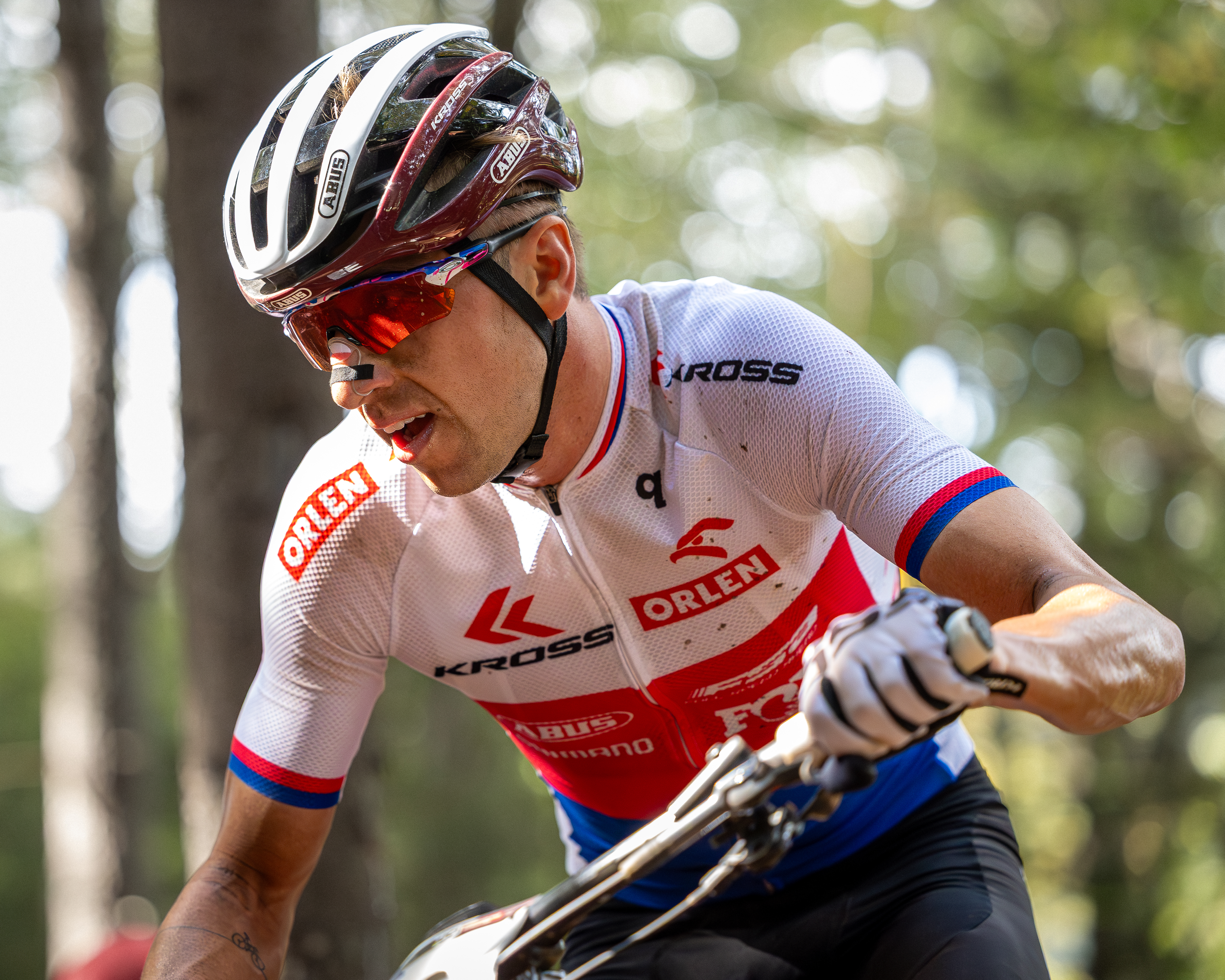
- Ondřej Cink at the UCI MTB World Cup in Snowshoe in 2021

Personal information
- Born: 7 December 1990 (age 35) Rokycany
- Height: 1.80 m (5 ft 11 in)
- Weight: 66 kg (146 lb)

Cycling career
- Sport: Cycling
- Current team: Kross Orlen Racing Team
- Disciplines: Mountain biking and road
- Role: Rider
- Rider type: Cross-country, Climber

Professional teams
- 2009–2016: Merida Biking
- 2017: Bahrain–Merida
- 2018: Primaflor–Mondraker–Rotor
- 2019–: Kross Racing Team

Major wins
- Mountain bike XC World Cup 1 individual win (2025)
Medal record
Representing Czech Republic
Men's mountain bike racing
World Championships
Gold medal – first place	2012 Saalfelden-Leogang	Under-23 Cross-country
Bronze medal – third place	2015 Vallnord	Cross-country
Bronze medal – third place	2010 Mont Sainte-Anne	Team relay

Ondřej Cink (Czech pronunciation: [ˈondr̝ɛj ˈtsɪŋk]; born 7 December 1990) is a Czech cross-country mountain biker and road racing cyclist. At the 2012 Summer Olympics, he competed in the Men's cross-country at Hadleigh Farm, finishing in 14th place. He finished in the same position at the 2016 Summer Olympics.

In October 2016 Bahrain–Merida announced that Cink would join them and switch to road racing for the 2017 season. In June 2017, he was named in the startlist for the 2017 Tour de France. Cink returned to mountain biking for the 2018 season, with Primaflor–Mondraker–Rotor. He was on the start list for the 2018 Cross-country European Championship and he finished 10th.

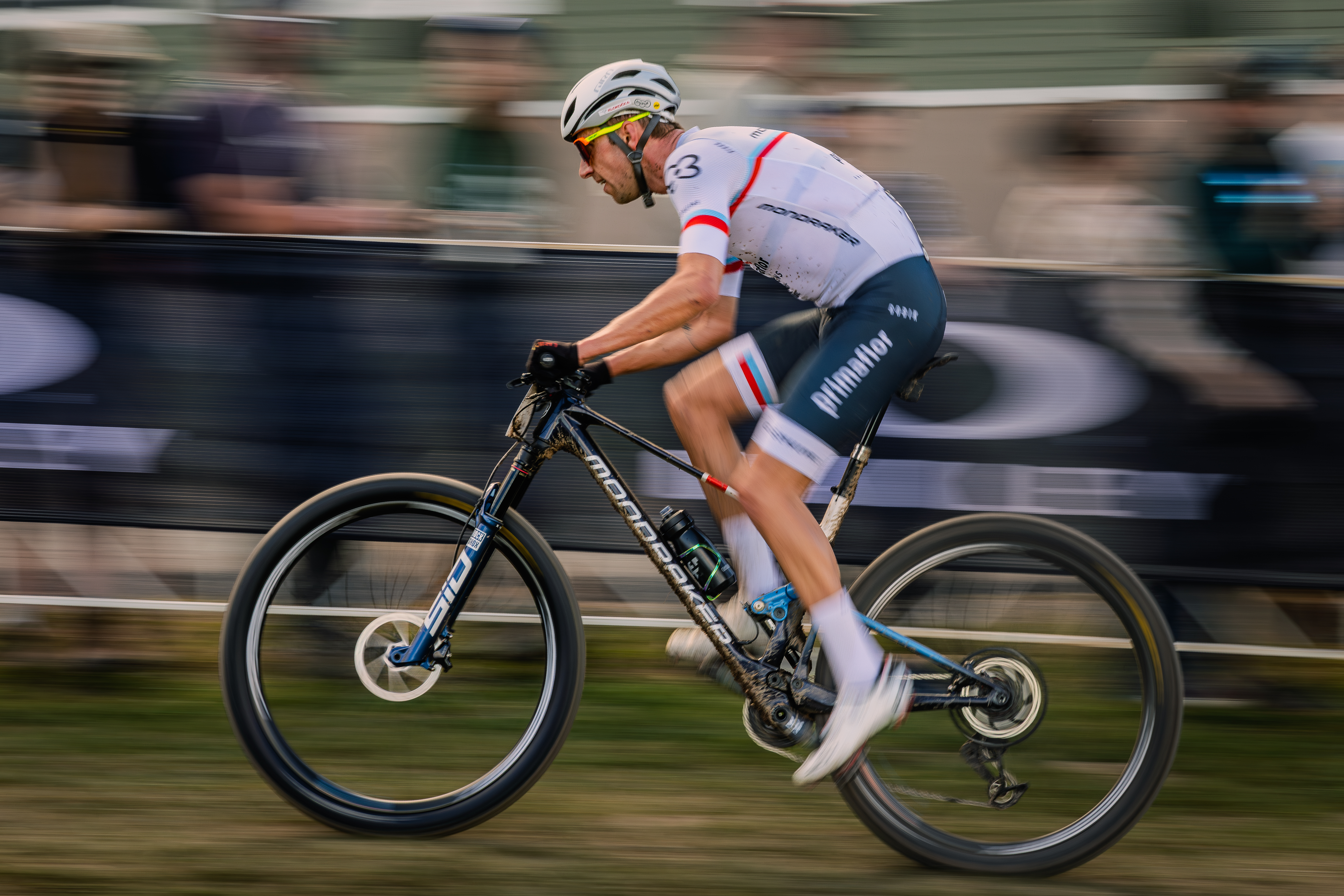
Cink in 2021 at the UCI Cross-Country MTB World Cup in Snowshoe

== Major results ==
=== Mountain bike ===
2010
3rd Team relay, UCI World Championships
2012
1st Cross-country, UCI World Under-23 Championships
1st Cross-country, European Under-23 Championships
2013
1st Cross-country, National Championships
3rd Team relay, UEC European Championships
2015
1st Cross-country, National Championships
3rd Cross-country, UCI World Championships
2016
3rd Cross-country, UEC European Championships
2019
1st Cross-country, National Championships
2020
1st Cross-country, National Championships
2021
1st Cross-country, National Championships
3rd Overall UCI XCO World Cup

2nd Leogang
2nd Les Gets
3rd Snowshoe

2022
1st Cross-country, National Championships
2023
1st Haiming
UCI XCO World Cup

3rd Leogang

2025
UCI XCO World Cup

1st Leogang

=== Road ===
2017
9th Overall Vuelta a Andalucía

==== Grand Tour general classification results timeline ====
Grand Tour	2017
Giro d'Italia	—
Tour de France	DNF
Vuelta a España	—

Legend
—	Did not compete
DNF	Did not finish
