= Marco Aurelio Fontana =

Italian cyclist (born 1984)

Marco Fontana
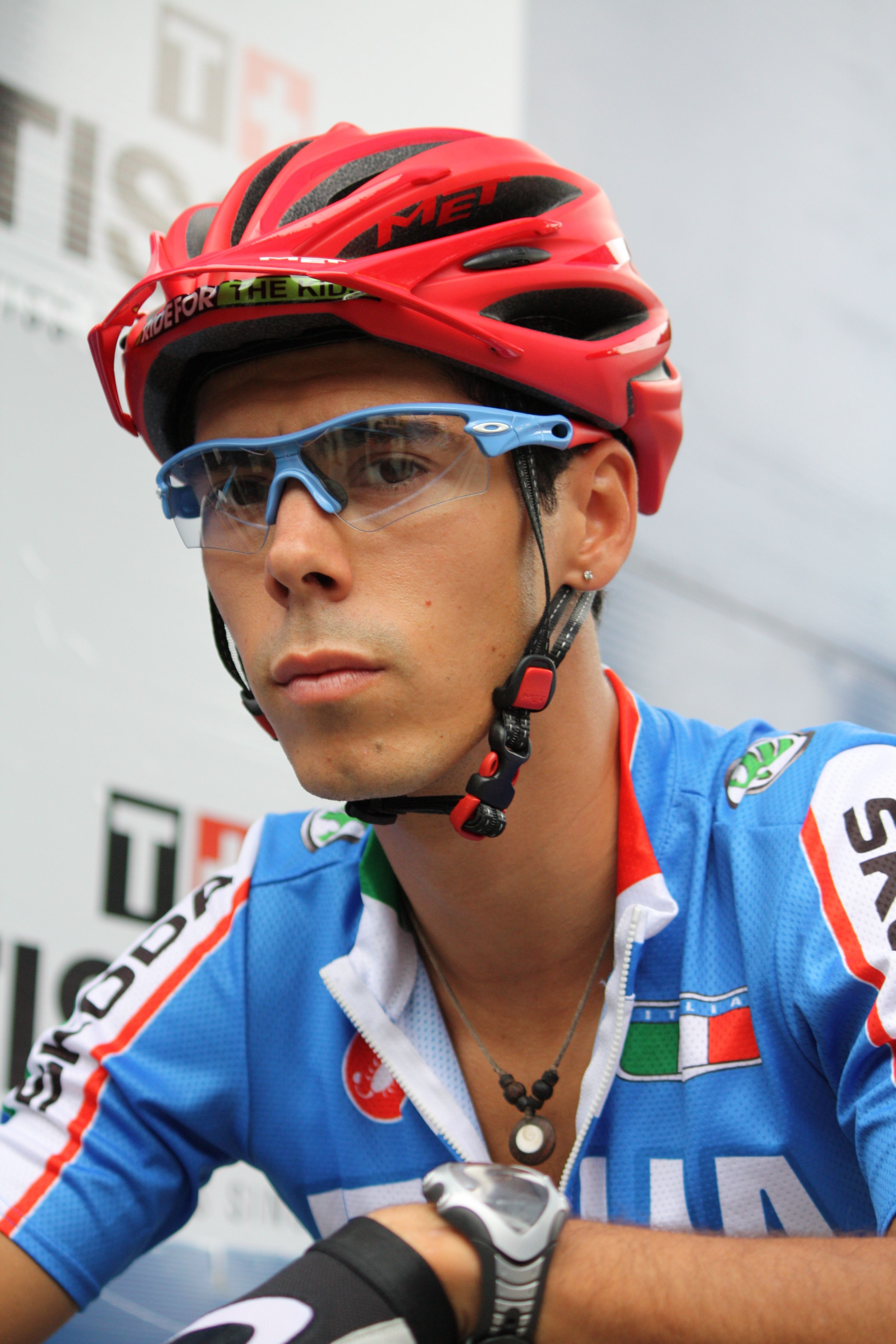

Personal information
- Full name: Marco Aurelio Fontana
- Born: 12 October 1984 (age 42) Giussano, Italy
- Height: 1.72 m (5 ft 8 in)
- Weight: 68 kg (150 lb)

Cycling career
- Sport: Cycling
- Current team: Retired
- Disciplines: Cyclo-cross; Mountain bike racing
- Role: Rider

Professional teams
- 2009–2016: Cannondale Factory Team
- 2017–2018: Bianchi Countervail
Medal record
Representing Italy
Men's mountain bike racing
Olympic Games
Bronze medal – third place	2012 London	Cross country
World Championships
Bronze medal – third place	2014 Hafjell	Cross-country
European Championships
Bronze medal – third place	2010 Haifa	Cross-country
Bronze medal – third place	2013 Bern	Cross-country

Marco Aurelio Fontana (born 12 October 1984) is an Italian former professional racing cyclist. He won the bronze medal in the cross-country mountain bike race at the 2012 Summer Olympics.

== Major results ==
=== Cyclo-cross ===
2003–2004
3rd National Under-23 Championships
2004–2005
2nd National Under-23 Championships
2005–2006
1st National Under-23 Championships
UCI Under-23 World Cup

3rd Wetzikon

4th UEC European Under-23 Championships
2006–2007
1st Valtellina Iperal Cross
2nd National Championships
2nd GP Città di Verbania
3rd Ciclocross del Ponte
2007–2008
1st National Championships
1st GP Città di Verbania
2nd Meilen
2008–2009
1st Trofeo Città di Lucca
1st GP Città San Martino
2nd National Championships
2nd Ciclocross del Ponte
2009–2010
1st National Championships
1st GP San Martino
2010–2011
1st National Championships
2nd GP Wetzikon
7th UCI World Championships
2011–2012
1st National Championships
1st Memorial Romano Scotti
2nd Ciclocross del Ponte
2012–2013
1st National Championships
1st Gran Premio Mamma E Papa Guerciotti
UCI World Cup

3rd Rome

3rd Dagmersellen
2013–2014
1st National Championships
2014–2015
1st National Championships
Giro d'Italia Cross

1st Roma
1st Padova

3rd Trofeo Coop Ed. Brugherio 82
10th UCI World Championships
2016–2017
1st Trofeo di Gorizia
2nd National Championships
2017–2018
3rd National Championships
3rd Trofeo di Gorizia

=== MTB ===
2002
1st Cross-country, National Junior Championships
2006
1st Cross-country, National Under-23 Championships
2008
2nd Team relay, UEC European Championships
3rd Team relay, UCI World Championships
5th Cross-country, Olympic Games
2009
1st Team relay, UCI World Championships
1st Cross-country, National Championships
2010
1st Cross-country, National Championships
UEC European Championships

2nd Team relay
3rd Cross-country

2011
1st Cross-country, National Championships
3rd Team relay, UCI World Championships
UCI XCO World Cup

3rd Dalby Forest

3rd Team relay, UEC European Championships
2012
1st Team relay, UCI World Championships
1st Cross-country, National Championships
3rd Cross-country, Olympic Games
4th Overall UCI XCO World Cup

3rd Houffalize
3rd Windham
3rd Val d'Isère

2013
1st Team relay, UCI World Championships
UEC European Championships

1st Team relay
3rd Cross-country

3rd Cross-country, National Championships
2014
3rd Team relay, UCI World Championships
3rd Team relay, UEC European Championships
2015
3rd Team relay, UCI World Championships
