= 2014 UCI Mountain Bike & Trials World Championships =

Event in Hafjell and Lillehammer, Norway

- Venue: Hafjell and Lillehammer, Norway
- Date(s): 2–7 September 2014
- Events: MTB: 13; Trials: 6

The 2014 UCI Mountain Bike & Trials World Championships was the 25th edition of the UCI Mountain Bike & Trials World Championships, held in Hafjell and Lillehammer, Norway.

== Medal summary ==
=== Men's events ===
Event	Gold	Silver	Bronze
Cross-country	Julien Absalon; France	Nino Schurter; Switzerland	Marco Aurelio Fontana; Italy
Under 23 cross-country	Michiel van der Heijden; Netherlands	Jordan Sarrou; France	Howard Grotts; United States
Junior cross-country	Simon Andreassen; Denmark	Egan Bernal; Colombia	Luca Schwarzbauer; Germany
Cross-country eliminator	Fabrice Mels; Belgium	Emil Lindgren; Sweden	Kevin Miquel; France
Downhill	Gee Atherton; Great Britain	Josh Bryceland; Great Britain	Troy Brosnan; Australia
Junior downhill	Loris Vergier; France	Laurie Greenland; Great Britain	Jacob Dickson; Ireland
Trials, 20 inch	Benito Ros; Spain	Abel Mustieles; Spain	Raphael Pils; Germany
Trials, 26 inch	Gilles Coustellier; France	Aurélien Fontenoy; France	Kenny Belaey; Belgium
Junior trials, 20 inch	Dominik Oswald; Germany	Oriol Roca; Spain	Alex Rudeau; France
Junior trials, 26 inch	Jack Carthy; Great Britain	Sergi Llongueras; Spain	Dominik Oswald; Germany

=== Women's events ===
Event	Gold	Silver	Bronze
Cross-country	Catharine Pendrel; Canada	Irina Kalentieva; Russia	Lea Davison; United States
Under 23 cross-country	Jolanda Neff; Switzerland	Margot Moschetti; France	Linda Indergand; Switzerland
Junior cross-country	Nicole Koller; Switzerland	Malene Degn; Denmark	Sina Frei; Switzerland
Cross-country eliminator	Kathrin Stirnemann; Switzerland	Linda Indergand; Switzerland	Ingrid Sofie Bøe Jakobsen; Norway
Downhill	Manon Carpenter; Great Britain	Rachel Atherton; Great Britain	Tahnee Seagrave; Great Britain
Junior downhill	Tegan Molloy; Australia	Viktoria Gimenez; France	Marine Cabirou; France
Trials	Tatiana Janickova; Slovakia	Nina Reichenbach; Germany	Gemma Abant; Spain

=== Team events ===
Event	Gold	Silver	Bronze
Cross-country	France; Jordan Sarrou; Hugo Pigeon; Pauline Ferrand-Prévot; Maxime Marotte	Switzerland; Andri Frischknecht; Filippo Colombo; Jolanda Neff; Nino Schurter	Czech Republic; Kryštof Bogar; Jan Rajchart; Kateřina Nash; Jaroslav Kulhavý
Trials	Germany	France	Spain

== Medal table ==
Rank	Nation	Gold	Silver	Bronze	Total
1	France (FRA)	4	5	3	12
2	Switzerland (SUI)	3	3	2	8
3	Great Britain (GBR)	3	3	1	7
4	Germany (GER)	2	1	3	6
5	Spain (ESP)	1	3	2	6
6	Denmark (DEN)	1	1	0	2
7	Belgium (BEL)	1	0	1	2
8	Australia (AUS)	1	0	0	1
8	Canada (CAN)	1	0	0	1
8	Netherlands (NED)	1	0	0	1
8	Slovakia (SVK)	1	0	0	1
12	Colombia (COL)	0	1	0	1
12	Russia (RUS)	0	1	0	1
12	Sweden (SWE)	0	1	0	1
15	United States (USA)	0	0	2	2
16	Czech Republic (CZE)	0	0	1	1
16	Ireland (IRL)	0	0	1	1
16	Italy (ITA)	0	0	1	1
16	Norway (NOR)	0	0	1	1
Totals (19 entries)		19	19	18	56

== See also ==
- 2014 UCI Mountain Bike World Cup
