= UCI Trials World Championships – Women's trials =

The women's trials is an event at the annual UCI Urban Cycling World Championships. It has been a UCI World Championships event since 2001.

From 2000 to 2016, the world championships trials were held alongside other mountain-biking disciplines as the UCI Mountain Bike & Trials World Championships. Beginning in 2017, the UCI World Championships trials are being run as part of the UCI Urban Cycling World Championships.

== Medalists ==
Championships	Gold	Silver	Bronze
2001 Vail	Karin Moor; Switzerland	Floriane Combé; France	Céline Warther; France
2002 Kaprun	Karin Moor; Switzerland	Lucie Miramond; France	Floriane Combé; France
2003 Lugano	Karin Moor; Switzerland	Ann-Christin Bettenhausen; Germany	Lucie Miramond; France
2004 Les Gets	Karin Moor; Switzerland	Ann-Christin Bettenhausen; Germany	Mireia Abant; Spain
2005 Livigno	Karin Moor; Switzerland	Ann-Christin Bettenhausen; Germany	Mireia Abant; Spain
2006 Rotorua	Karin Moor; Switzerland	Mireia Abant; Spain	Gemma Abant; Spain
2007 Fort William	Karin Moor; Switzerland	Gemma Abant; Spain	Mireia Abant; Spain
2008 Val di Sole	Gemma Abant; Spain	Karin Moor; Switzerland	Julie Pesenti; France
2009 Canberra	Karin Moor; Switzerland	Julie Pesenti; France	Gemma Abant; Spain
2010 Mont Sainte-Anne	Gemma Abant; Spain	Karin Moor; Switzerland	Tatiana Janickova; Slovakia
2011 Champéry	Karin Moor; Switzerland	Gemma Abant; Spain	Mireia Abant; Spain
2012 Leogang-Saalfelden	Gemma Abant; Spain	Andrea Wesp; Germany	Tatiana Janickova; Slovakia
2013 Pietermaritzburg	Tatiana Janíčková; Slovakia	Gemma Abant; Spain	Janine Jungfels; Australia
2014 Lillehammer-Hafjell	Tatiana Janíčková; Slovakia	Nina Reichenbach; Germany	Gemma Abant; Spain
2015 Vallnord	Janine Jungfels; Australia	Tatiana Janíčková; Slovakia	Nina Reichenbach; Germany
2016 Val di Sole	Nina Reichenbach; Germany	Janine Jungfels; Australia	Perrine Devahive; Belgium
2017 Chengdu	Nina Reichenbach; Germany	Nadine Kåmark; Sweden	Irene Caminos; Spain
2018 Chengdu	Nina Reichenbach; Germany	Manon Basseville; France	Janine Jungfels; Australia
2019 Chengdu	Nina Reichenbach; Germany	Vera Barón; Spain	Manon Basseville; France
2021 Vic	Vera Barón; Spain	Nina Reichenbach; Germany	Manon Basseville; France
2022 Abu Dhabi	Nina Reichenbach; Germany	Vera Barón; Spain	Hilda Andersson; Sweden
2023 Glasgow	Nina Reichenbach; Germany	Vera Barón; Spain	Alba Riera; Spain
2024 Abu Dhabi	Alba Riera; Spain	Vera Barón; Spain	Nina Reichenbach; Germany
2025 Riyadh	Alba Riera; Spain	Vera Barón; Spain	Nina Vabre; France

== Medal table ==
Rank	Nation	Gold	Silver	Bronze	Total
1	Switzerland	9	2	0	11
2	Spain	6	9	9	24
3	Germany	6	6	2	14
4	Slovakia	2	1	2	5
5	Australia	1	1	2	4
6	France	0	4	7	11
7	Sweden	0	1	1	2
8	Belgium	0	0	1	1
Totals (8 entries)		24	24	24	72
