= Gee Atherton =

English racing cyclist (born 1985)

Gee Ragdoll Atherton
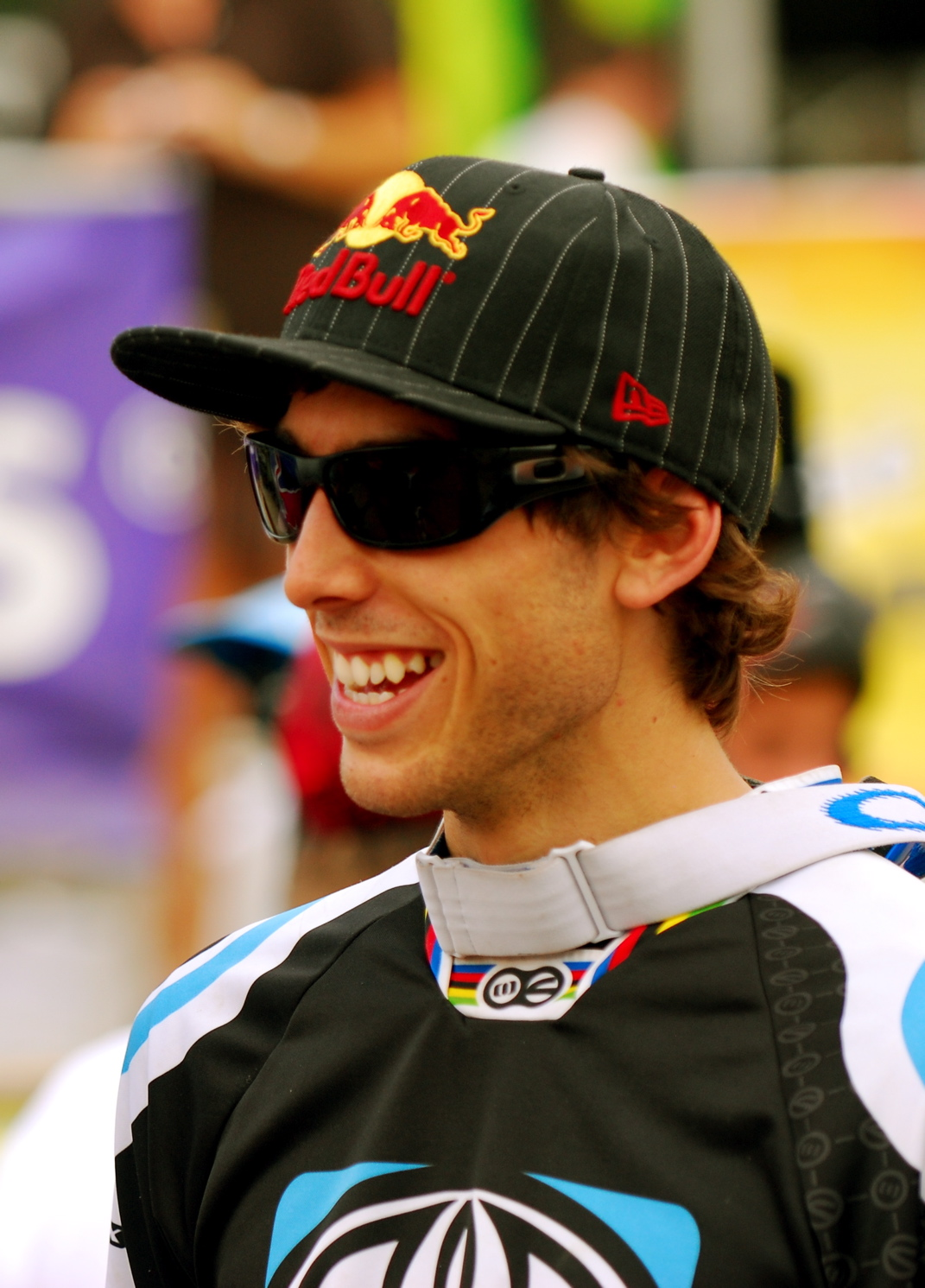

Personal information
- Full name: George David Atherton
- Nicknames: Gee, GeeMan
- Born: 26 February 1985 (age 41) Salisbury, England, United Kingdom
- Height: 190 cm (6 ft 3 in)
- Weight: 85 kg (187 lb)

Cycling career
- Sport: Cycling
- Current team: Atherton Bikes
- Discipline: DH MTB
- Role: Explorer
- Rider type: DH & 4X

Professional teams
- 2001: Animal
- 2002–2003: Animal/Muddy Fox
- 2004: Muddy Fox
- 2007–2011: Animal Commençal
- 2011–2015: GT Bicycles
- 2015–2019: Trek Factory Racing
- 2019-: Atherton Racing

Major wins
- (United Kingdom) GBR DH National Champion (1 Wins); (Europe) EUR DH European Champion (1 Wins); UCI DH World Champion (2 Wins); UCI DH World Cup (7 Wins); UCI 4X World Cup (1 Wins); UCI DH World Cup Overall Champion (1 Wins)
Medal record
Representing Great Britain
Men's mountain bike racing
World Championships
Gold medal – first place	2008 Val di Sole	Downhill
Gold medal – first place	2014 Hafjell	Downhill
Silver medal – second place	2012 Leogang-Saalfelden	Downhill
Bronze medal – third place	2007 Fort William	Downhill

George David Atherton, known as Gee Atherton (born 26 February 1985, near Salisbury, England) is a British professional racing cyclist specializing in downhill and four cross mountain bike racing, and is a multiple national champion, multiple World Cup winner, and 2008 & 2014 Downhill World Champion. He is also a rally driver and competed in his first International event in 2017 at Wales Rally GB.

== Career ==
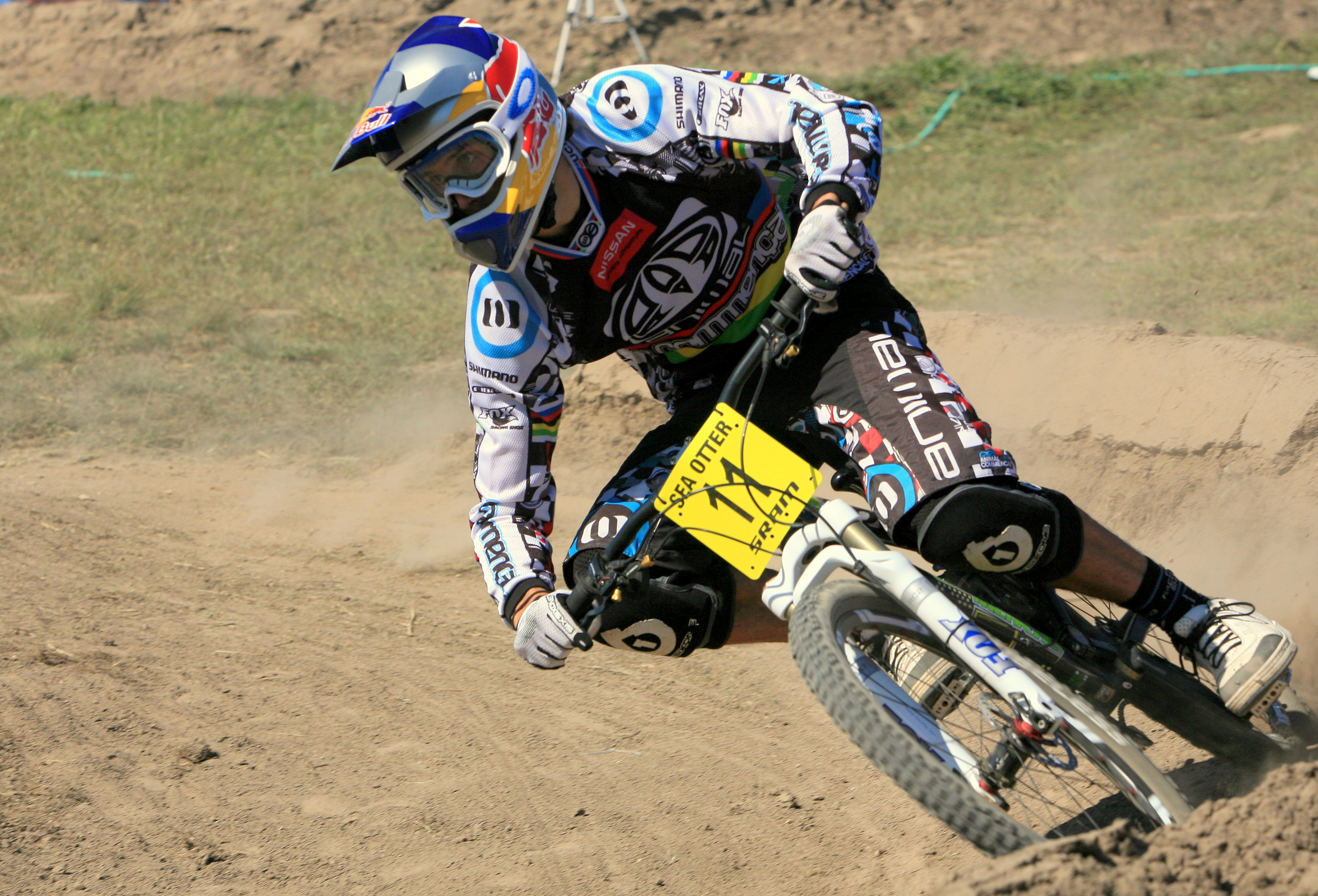
Gee Atherton in the Elite Men's Dual Slalom race at the 2009 Sea Otter Classic in Laguna Seca, CA.

Gee made his debut at Red Bull Rampage in 2003 at the age of 18, following his silver medal win at the Junior World Championships earlier that year.

From 2007 to 2011, Gee was one third of the Animal Commençal racing team, alongside brother Dan Atherton and sister Rachel Atherton. In 2012 the Athertons started riding for team GT Factory Racing, along with Marc Beaumont.

Gee, along with Rachel and Dan, is the star of the web series "The Atherton Project" a series which follows their day-to-day lives. In 2012 Gee was racing for GT racing.

On the 25th of January 2019, Gee launched Atherton Bikes along with Rachel and Dan and suspension designer Dave Weagle, utilising additive manufacturing technology to create the range of bikes they wanted to ride.

In the 2012 season, Gee finished 3rd overall to Greg Minnaar and American world cup winner Aaron Gwin. At the world championships in Leogang Austria Gee finished 2nd by 0.58 of a second to Greg Minnaar.

He was pre-qualified for the world-renowned 2012 Red Bull Rampage in Utah but after a major crash in practice, he was unable to compete.

Gee appeared on the BBC's Top Gear (series 7), racing a Renault Clio down the streets of Lisbon and winning.

== Palmarès ==
2000
3rd DH, British National Mountain Biking Championships - Youth

2001
1st (United Kingdom) DH, British National Mountain Biking Championships - Youth

2002
1st (United Kingdom) DH, British National Mountain Biking Championships - Junior

2003
1st (United Kingdom) DH, British National Mountain Biking Championships - Junior

2004
1st DH, UCI Mountain Bike World Cup, Round 3, Schladming, Austria
1st (United Kingdom) DH, British National Mountain Biking Championships
2nd FR, Red Bull Rampage

2007
1st (Europe) DH, European Mountain Bike Championships
3rd DH, UCI Mountain Bike & Trials World Championships, Fort William
1st 4X, UCI Mountain Bike World Cup, Round 1, Vigo, Spain
6th DH, UCI Mountain Bike World Cup, Round 1, Vigo, Spain
2nd DH, UCI Mountain Bike World Cup, Round 4, Schladming
2nd DH, UCI Mountain Bike World Cup, Round 5, Maribor
4th NPS DH, Round 3, Moelfre
1st NPS DH, Round 4, Caersws
1st NPS DH, Round 5, Innerleithen
1st Fat Face Night Race
1st Red Bull Metro Ride
1st Red Bull Goldmine
2nd Urban Pro, Paris

2008
1st DH, UCI Mountain Bike World Cup, Round 2, Vallnord, Andorra
1st Maxxis Cup, Gouveia, Portugal
1st Alpine Bikes Winter Series, Scotland
1st DH, Monster Energy Garbanzo Downhill, Kokanee Crankworx, Whistler, Canada
1st NPS round 1 Ae (Scotland)
1st DH, UCI Mountain Bike & Trials World Championships, Trentino, Italy

2009
1st UK National Champs DH Innerleithen, Scotland

2010
2nd DH, UCI Mountain Bike World Cup, Round 1, Maribor, Slovenia
1st DH, UCI Mountain Bike World Cup, Round 2, Fort William, Scotland
2nd DH, UCI Mountain Bike World Cup, Round 3, Leogang, Austria
1st DH, UCI Mountain Bike World Cup, Round 4, Champery, Switzerland
3rd DH, UCI Mountain Bike World Cup, Round 5, Val di Sole, Italy
1st DH, UCI Mountain Bike World Cup, Round 6, Windham, United States
1st DH, UCI Mountain Bike World Cup, Overall
2nd FR, Redbull Rampage

2011
3rd DH, UCI Mountain Bike World Cup, Round 1, Pietermaritzburg, South Africa
4th DH, UCI Mountain Bike World Cup, Round 2, Fort William, Scotland
2nd DH, UCI Mountain Bike World Cup, Round 3, Leogang, Austria
2nd DH, UCI Mountain Bike World Cup, Round 6, La Bresse, France
5th DH, UCI Mountain Bike World Cup, Overall

2012
4th DH, UCI Mountain Bike World Cup, Round 1, Pietermaritzburg, South Africa
2nd DH, 2012 UCI Mountain Bike & Trials World Championships, Leogang-Saalfelden, Austria

2013
1st DH, UCI Mountain Bike World Cup, Round 1, Fort William, Scotland
1st DH, UCI Mountain Bike World Cup, Round 2, Val Di Sole, Italy
2nd DH, UCI Mountain Bike World Cup, Overall

2014
1st DH, 2014 UCI Mountain Bike & Trials World Championships, Hafjell, Norway
