= Full Cycle: A World Odyssey =

1994 mountain biking video documentary

Full Cycle: A World Odyssey is a mountain biking video title that chronicles the travel adventures of San Diego husband and wife team, Mark Schulze and Patty Mooney who, in 1993 and 1994, went in search of the best single-track mountain trails of nine countries, which included the United States, Canada, Costa Rica, Wales, Switzerland, Greece, Tahiti, Australia, and India.

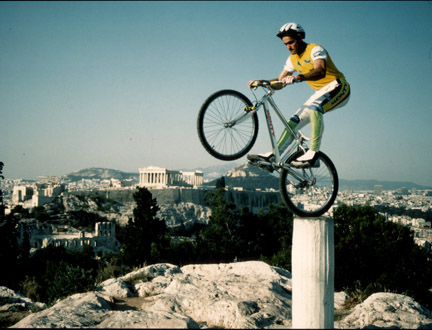
Ot Pi, Athens, Greece, 1994

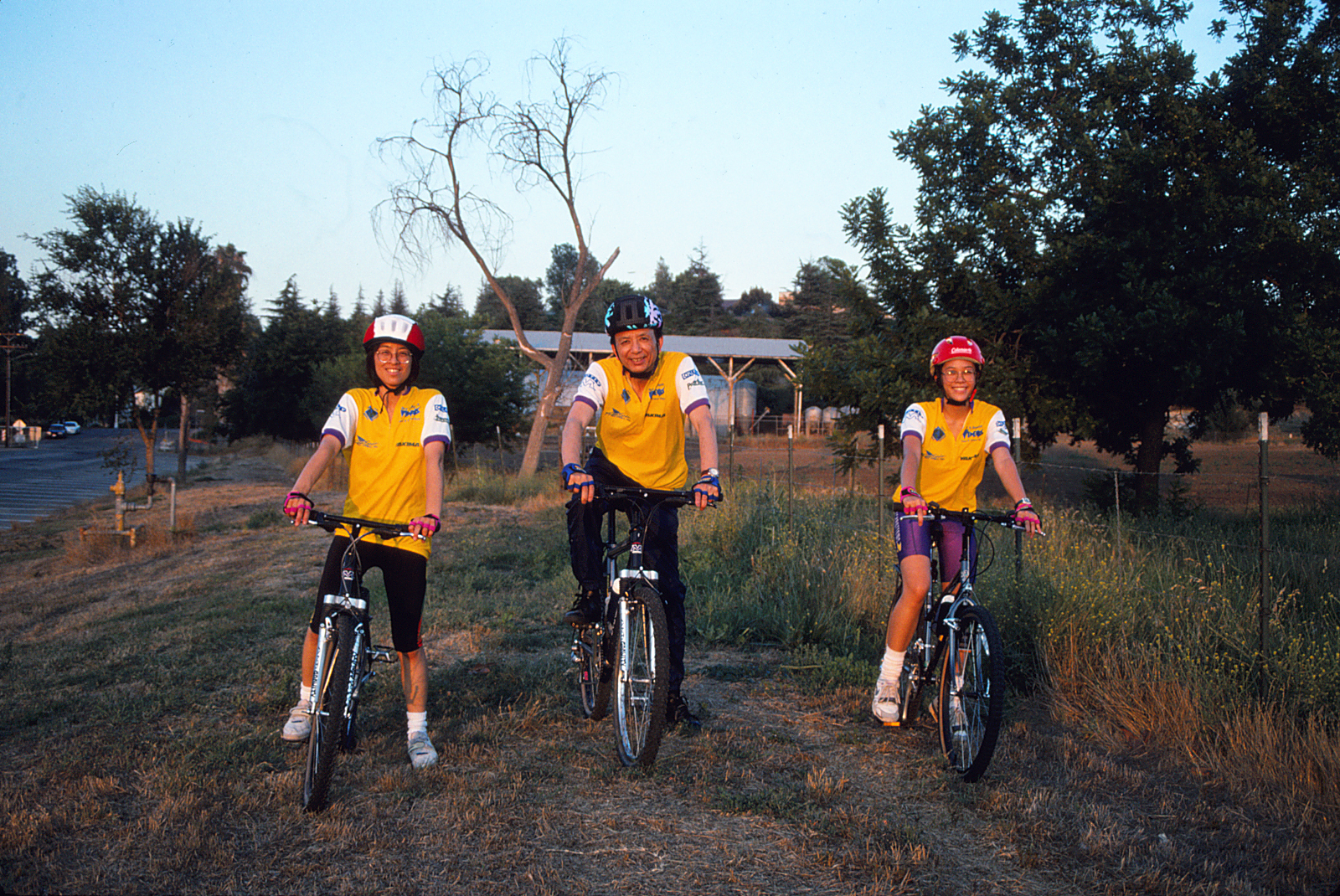
The James Hong Family - Susan, James and April, Hollywood, 1994

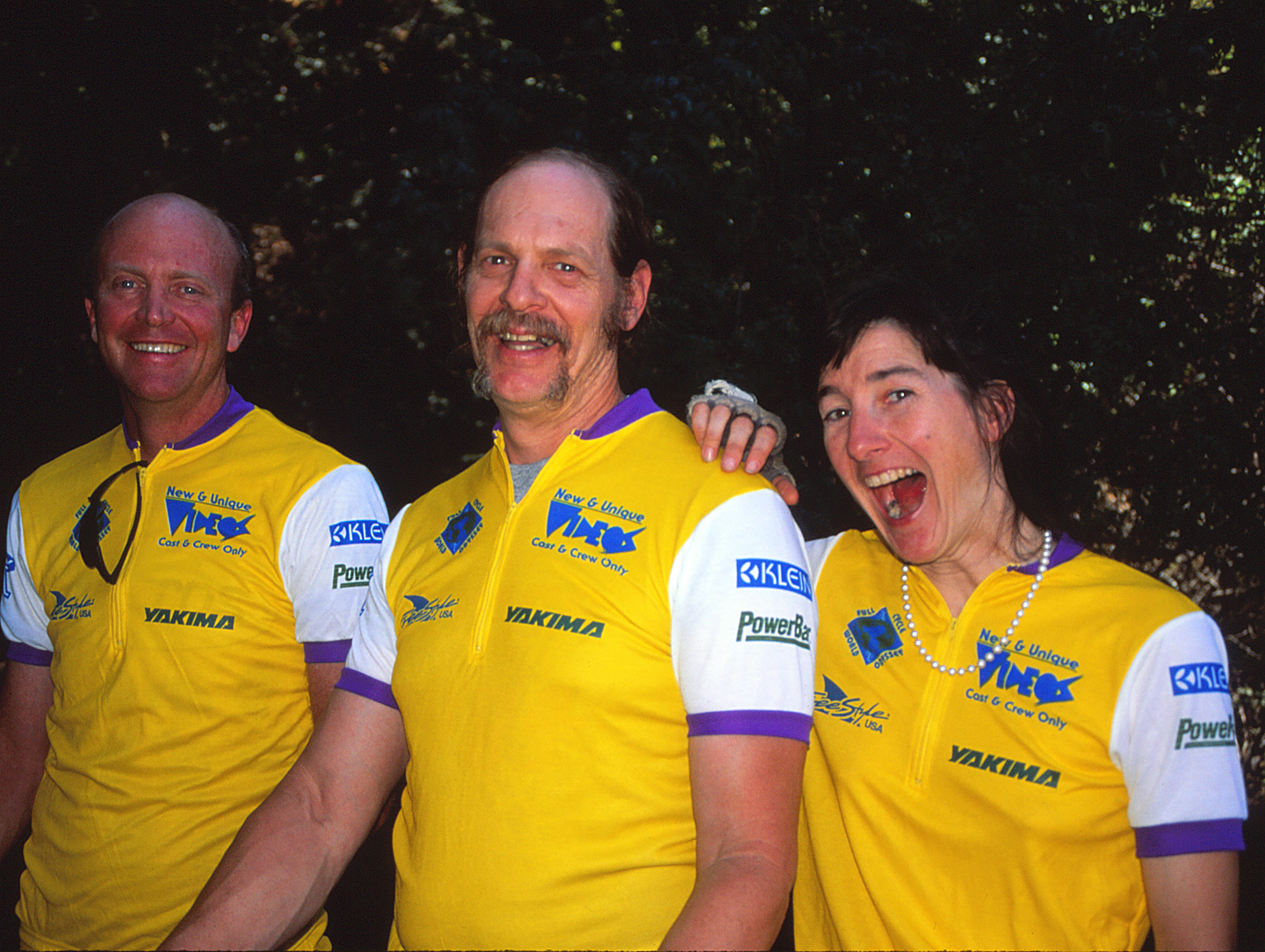
Gary Fisher, Charlie Kelly and Jacquie Phelan at Mt. Tamalpais, 1994

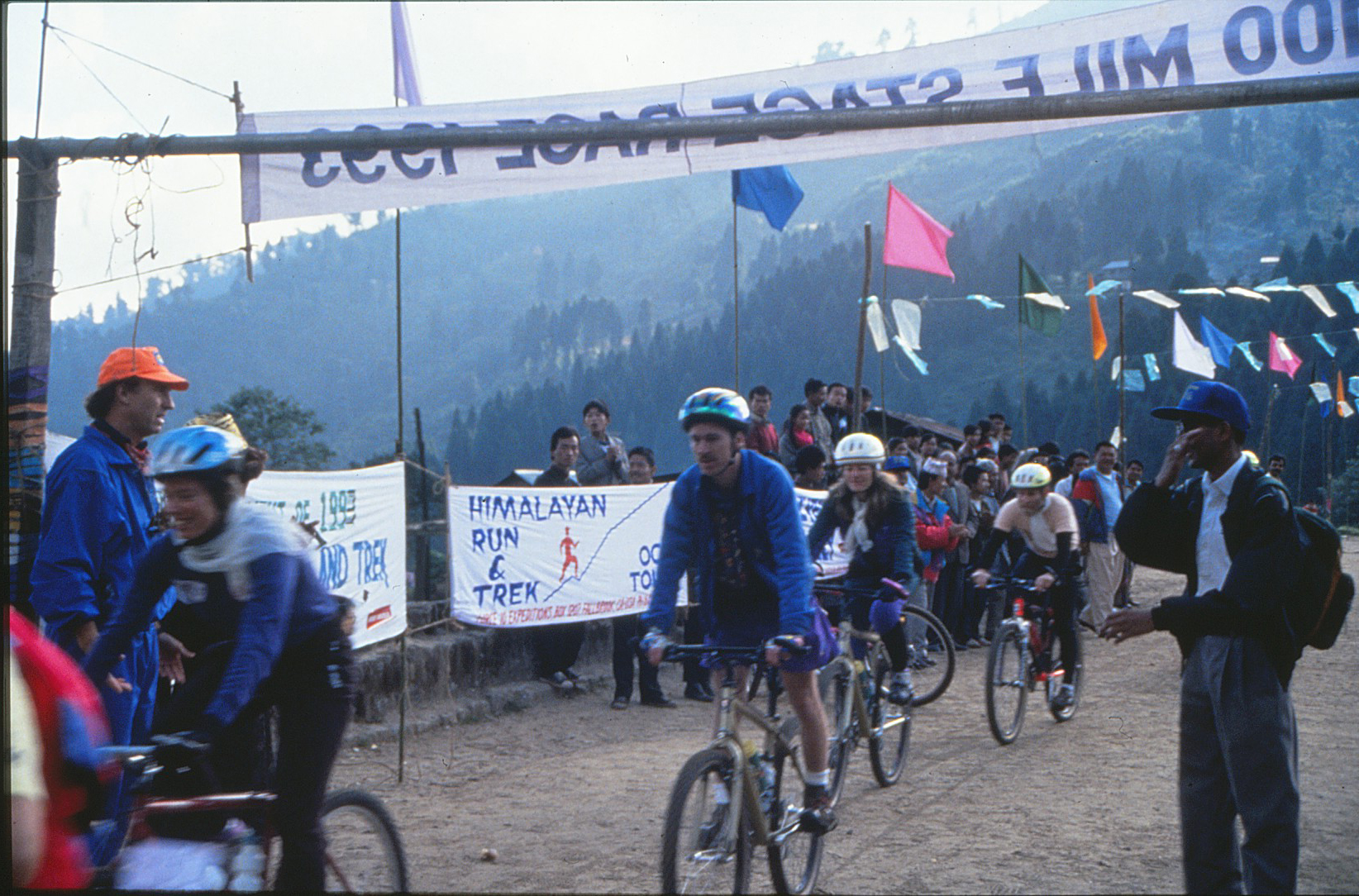
First ever Mt. Everest Mountain Bike Rally, 1993

Featured in the documentary are actor James Hong and his family, along with mountain bike pioneers Gary Fisher, Charlie Kelly, Jacquie Phelan, and World Trials Champion, Ot Pi of Barcelona. Summit Magazine, among other publications, referred to it as the Endless Summer on Wheels.

== Background ==
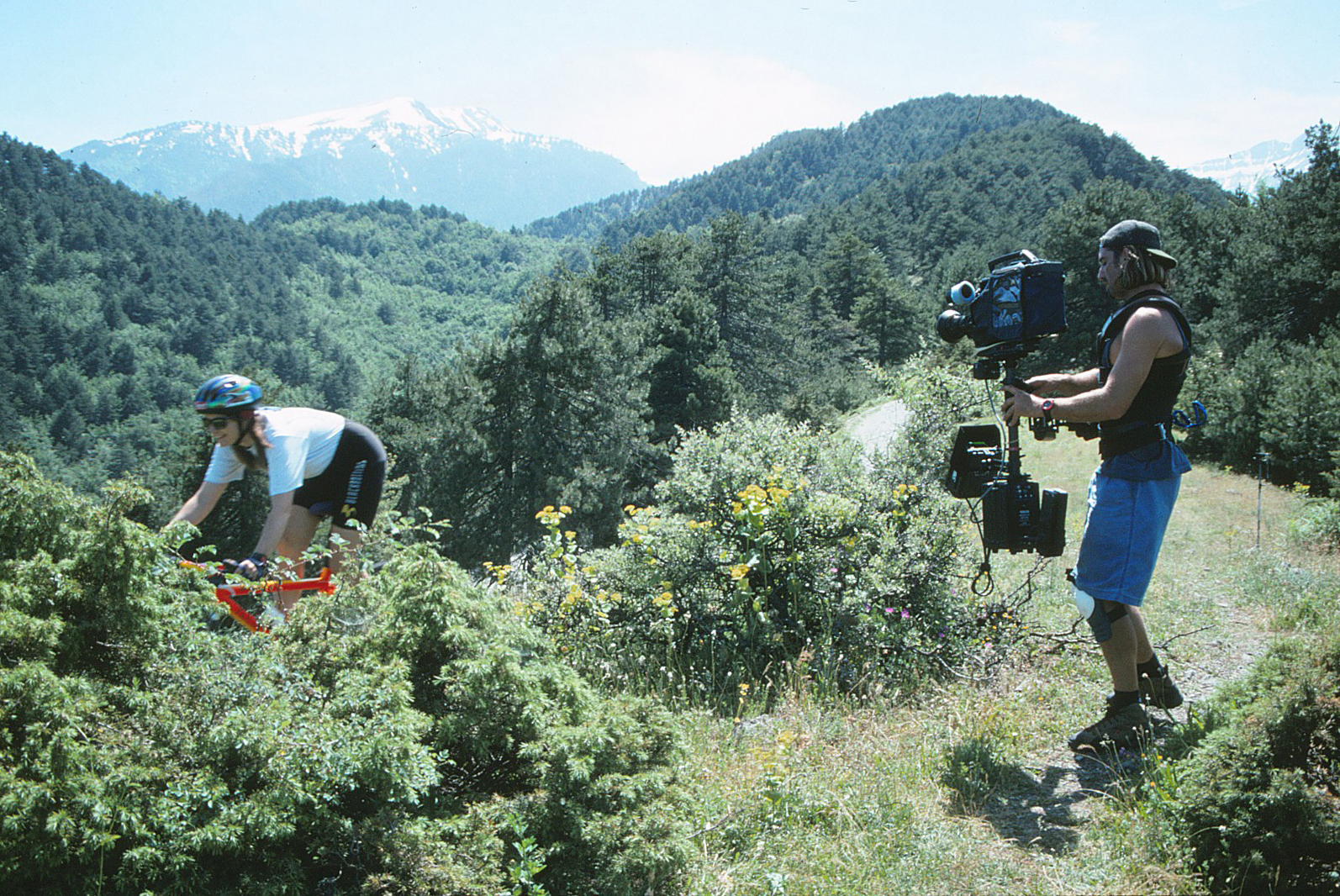
Steadicam operator videotapes: Patty Mooney mountain biking at Mt. Olympus, Greece

After producing three mountain-bike video titles in the late 1980s and early 1990s, including The Great Mountain Biking Video, "the world's first mountain biking video," Schulze and Mooney decided to make the Endless Summer on Mountain Bikes video and worked with four camera operators during several phases of their journey. Mark Schulze, himself an award-winning director of photography, shot many of the scenic clips. Jimmy Gareri shot aerial footage in San Diego. Mark Eveslage, a National Geographic director of photography, videotaped in the United States, Costa Rica, South Pacific, and India locations. Dick Crow, who also wore a Steadicam rig for many of his shots, videotaped in the European locations. Ralph Chaney videotaped in Vancouver and Whistler, Canada. Schultze and Mooney took two years to acquire 75 hours of footage, which was then edited into a two-hour, broadcast-quality documentary by their friend, Steve Langius.

Shots include: city life in Vancouver, London, Athens, Adelaide, an assortment of villages around the globe, the American Southwest, South Australia's Flinders Ranges and Kangaroo Island, the Matterhorn and snowy summer Alps, Welsh moors, forests and waterfalls, Tahitian jagged volcanic peaks, caves, rainbows, British Columbian bears, Brazilian street dancers in Geneva, an Indian elephant lifting a bicycle and India's Himalayas and spiritual culture.

Schulze and Mooney logged all the footage from their journeys and began to market them as stock clips with their company New & Unique Videos, thus creating San Diego's first stock footage library.

== World's Firsts ==
Interwoven into this video production were several world's firsts.

The couple obtained over 75 hours of new stock footage, featuring "world's firsts": first Westerners to travel (and bicycle) through the Himalayas of North Sikkim, India; first to ride a mountain bike 60 feet under the Pacific Ocean, and in a semi-active volcano in Costa Rica; first to document nine-times world's champion bicycle trials rider Ot Pi, performing stunts near and around historical landmarks in Athens, Greece.

- 1993 - Among group of first mountain bikers to ride in the Mt. Everest Mountain Bike Rally
- 1993 - Among group of first Westerners allowed to travel into Northern Sikkim, India, with mountain bikes

This is truly Shangri-La and we are the first Westerners - not to mention mountain bikers - to be allowed into this restricted realm.

... the couple join the first-ever Everest Mountain Bike Rally, which begins at 7,000 feet. Following one first with another, they become the first mountain bikers in northern Sikkim.

- 1994 - First scuba-mountain bikers off the west coast of Costa Rica and 60 feet below the surface of the Pacific Ocean
- 1994 - First videographers to document World Trials Champion, Ot Pi performing stunts in Athens, Greece
- 1994 - First couple to bring mountain-bike tourism to South Australia
- 1996 - Establishment of San Diego's first stock footage library, New & Unique Videos

== Sites visited ==
- Darjeeling, India
- Flinders Ranges, South Australia
- Grand Canyon, Arizona, USA
- Kangaroo Island, South Australia
- Matterhorn, Switzerland
- Meiringen, Switzerland
- Mount Olympus, Greece
- Mont Orohena, Tahiti
- Snowdon, Wales, UK
- Mount Tamalpais, California, USA
- Sikkim, India
- Turrialba Volcano, Costa Rica
- Whistler Mountain, British Columbia, Canada

== Recognition ==
=== Awards ===
- 1995 - Charleston International Film Festival - Silver Award
- 1995 - Chicago International Film Festival - Silver Hugo
- 1995 - New York International Festivals Award
- 1996 - Cindy Awards - Two Bronze, three Blue Ribbons

=== Reception ===
Orange County Bicyclist. Praised the international scope of Full Cycle and said that others found it appealing and inspirational.

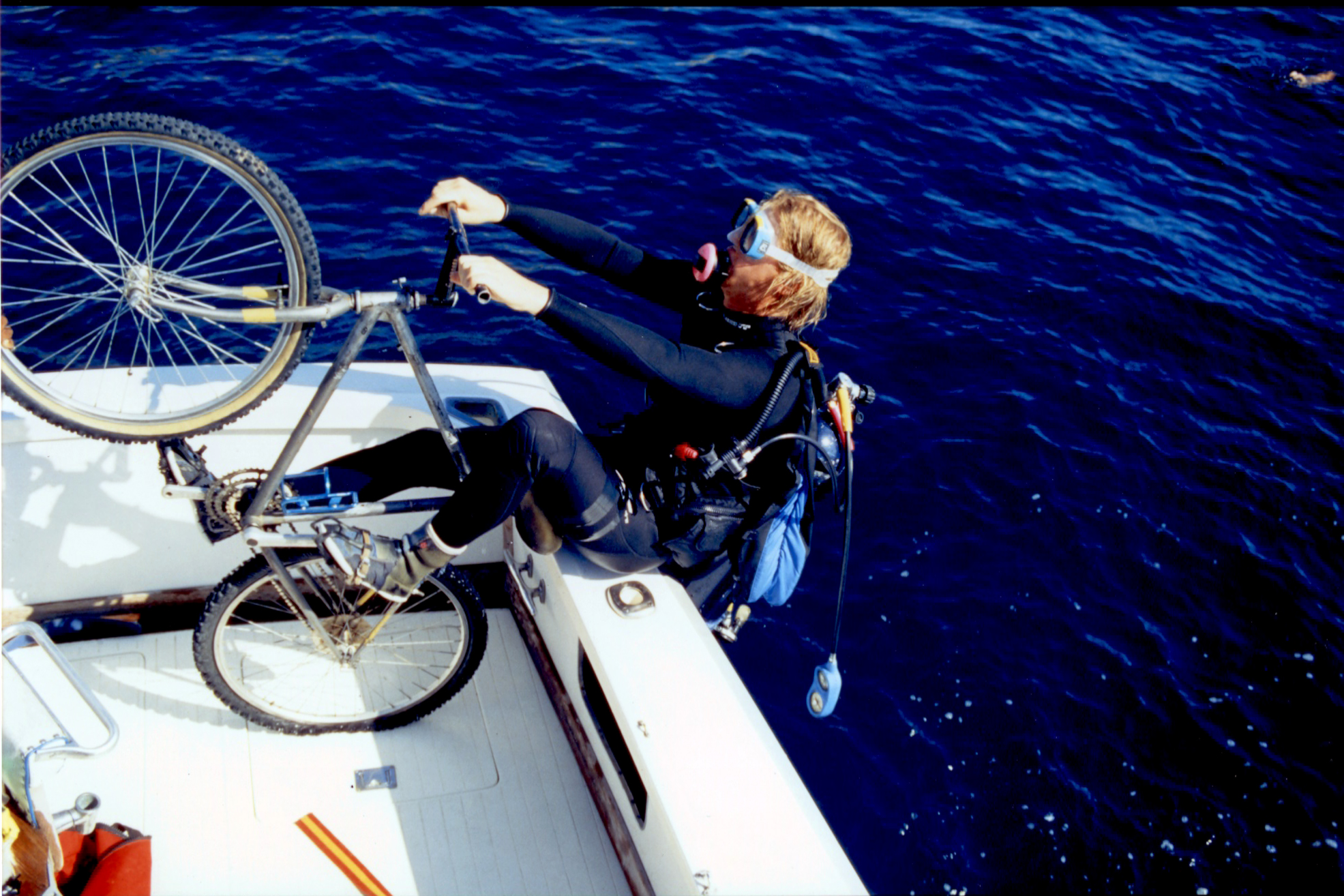
Jason Borner, World's First Underwater Mountain Biker, Costa Rica, 1994

In 1994, Post Magazine wrote,

"[This show] features several world's firsts: first Westerners to travel (and bicycle) through the Himalayas of North Sikkim, India; first to ride a mountain bike 60 feet under the Pacific Ocean, and in a semi-active volcano in Costa Rica; first to document nine-times world's champion bicycle trials rider, Ot Pi, performing stunts near and around historical landmarks in Athens, Greece."

In 1995, VeloNews reviewed the documentary, saying

Yeah, okay, so who wouldn't want to do it, right? Pack up all your cares and woes, go and tweak your boss's nose, bye, bye, day shift. Really. It's the great American dream. Pack up and ship out for parts unknown with your significant other and your bicycle. What a rush. It's life. It's adventure. It's your chance to finally learn what really does sit just around the next corner on the best single-tracks in Canada and Great Britain and Switzerland ... or the more exotic Greece, or even more exotic Costa Rica, or - add a new level of exotica here - Tahiti or India. Come on. Who wouldn't? ... Mark Schulze and Patricia Mooney did what the rest of us merely dream of: They chased their dreams and front forks around the world and lived to shoot video about it, made a show ... and now get to write it all off ... The videography of the work is spectacular. How the crew of five videographers - one occasionally shooting from a SteadiCam - captured the shots they did is truly beyond me. There are scenes where I could swear a crane was used for effect, when, in fact, there was no way to humanly get a crane into that location. In short, it is beautifully shot.

Catherine Applefeld wrote in Billboard:

This documentary/travelog is the result of the production crew meeting up with the featured husband-and-wife cycling team as they traversed the globe MTV Sports-style in search of the best mountain bike ride on earth ... This sweeping overview provides some terrific footage of a variety of landscape, as well as plenty of action for cycling enthusiasts. Billboard also said Mark Schulze and Patty Mooney can knock you out with a real sense of "wow," including highlights of trials champ Ot Pi doin' his thang at the Parthenon and a treacherous helmet-cam descent into a volcano.

Video Columnist, Robert J. Hawkins, penned a story about Full Cycle in The San Diego Union-Tribune Sunday supplement called Night & Day, saying

Back in February 1993, we introduced you to filmmakers Mark Schulze and Patricia Mooney, a husband and wife who share many passions, among them mountain biking and travel. They were even married in a San Diego County park, on mountain bikes. Schulze and Mooney were in the early stages of a fantastic and improbable project back then. They wanted to travel the world in search of the best mountain-biking trails. They would, of course, film their odyssey and turn it into a documentary. It took three years, a quarter-million dollars and 75 hours of Betacam SP tape footage -- but they completed their quest ... Schulze and Mooney came back with more than spectacular scenery, of which there is an abundance here. They manage, too, to convey the joy they experience in getting out on two wheels on an open trail. They've created an Endless Summer for the mountain-biking crowd.

OCSD Film & Video News wrote a front-page story about New & Unique Videos in its November 1995 issue, mentioning "movie star James Hong of Blade Runner and Wayne's World II and his family take viewers on a fun-filled mountain bike ride through their Hollywood Hills neighborhood."

Of World Odyssey, Video Alert wrote ''Full Cycle: A World Odyssey" is the "Endless Summer" of mountain bike videos as Mark Schulze and Patty Mooney crisscross the globe in search of, not the perfect wave, but the perfect trail. ... at the heart of Full Cycle is a freewheeling love story seemingly straight out of a Hollywood screenplay. Yes, Mark and Patty really did get married on their mountain bikes.

The Rotarian noted in 1996 that Schulze and Mooney "combined their interests and talents" to create the World Odyssey and that "It's a good mix of adventure and geography."

In May 1996, Marie Loggia wrote in Outdoor Action:

Close to two hours on mountain biking. First of all, I thought, you've got to really love the sport to watch this thing. But I was wrong, even if you're not a mountain bike fanatic, Full Cycle: A World Odyssey offers plenty of scenery. It's like a nature show combined with travel, a splash of history lesson, all mixed together with mountain biking ... Full Cycle is the brainchild of Mark Schulze and Patty Mooney. When Schulze and Mooney married they swore to someday travel across the globe, visiting the best mountain bike trails the world has to offer. Well, as you can see, they did it ... This can definitely be labeled one of those wish videos. It would be wonderful to ride around the beautiful volcanoes and lush tropical banana fields of Costa Rica. In Switzerland, the scenery became more serene as they rode the world's finest single track around the eastern end of Lake Geneva. Imagine riding around the Matterhorn (the original, not Disney recreation) at 14,690 feet!

A sidebar in New Woman Magazine asked:

Fascinated by the idea of mountain biking through some rough but exotic terrains? "Full Cycle: A World Odyssey" takes video viewers to nine great destinations that emphasize biking, with an overview of local sites and their histories ... The two-part video features superb views, from deep in the Grand Canyon to the trails of the Matterhorn to scuba biking in Costa Rica.
