= GT Factory Racing =

Pro biking team

Team information
- UCI code: GTR
- Registered: United Kingdom
- Founded: 2007
- Discipline: Mountain bike
- Bicycles: Trek

Key personnel
- General manager: Dan Brown
- Team manager: Simon Atherton

Team name history
- 2007–2011 2012–2015 2015–: Animal Commençal; GT Factory Racing; Trek Factory Racing

Atherton Racing, competing officially as Trek Factory Racing, formerly as GT Factory Racing (UCI team code: ANC), is a professional mountain bike racing team competing in the World Cup and World Champs, as well as national level events, in the downhill category. The team began as Animal Commençal.

== Palmarès ==
2008
1st DH, Alpine Bikes Winter Series, Scotland - Gee Atherton
1st DH, Alpine Bikes Winter series, Scotland - Rachel Atherton
1st DH, Maxxis Cup, Gouveia, Portugal - Gee Atherton
1st DH, Maxxis Cup, Gouveia, Portugal - Rachel Atherton
2nd DH, Maxxis Cup, Gouveia, Portugal - Dan Atherton
1st DH, NPS, Round 1, Ae Forest, Scotland - Gee Atherton
1st DH, UCI Mountain Bike World Cup, Round 1, Maribor, Slovenia - Rachel Atherton
1st DH, Canadian Open, Kokanee Crankworx, Whistler, Canada - Rachel Atherton
1st DH, Monster Energy Garbanzo Downhill, Kokanee Crankworx, Whistler, Canada - Gee Atherton
1st DH, Monster Energy Garbanzo Downhill, Kokanee Crankworx, Whistler, Canada - Rachel Atherton
1st DH, UCI Mountain Bike World Cup, Round 2, Vallnord, Andorra - Gee Atherton
1st DH, UCI Mountain Bike World Cup, Round 2, Vallnord, Andorra - Rachel Atherton
1st 4X, UCI Mountain Bike World Cup, Round 2, Vallnord, Andorra - Dan Atherton
3rd DH, UCI Mountain Bike World Cup, Round 3, Fort William, Scotland - Rachel Atherton
1st DH, UCI Mountain Bike & Trials World Championships, Trentino, Italy - Gee Atherton
1st DH, UCI Mountain Bike & Trials World Championships, Trentino, Italy - Rachel Atherton
1st DH, UCI Mountain Bike World Cup, Round 4, Mont-Sainte-Anne, Canada - Rachel Atherton
1st DH, UCI Mountain Bike World Cup, Round 5, Bromont, Canada - Rachel Atherton
2nd DH, UCI Mountain Bike World Cup, Round 6, Canberra, Australia - Rachel Atherton
1st DH, UCI Mountain Bike World Cup, Round 7, Schladming, Austria - Rachel Atherton
1st DH, UCI Mountain Bike World Cup, Series Overall - Rachel Atherton
3rd DH, UCI Mountain Bike World Cup, Series Overall - Gee Atherton

2009

== 2013 Team roster ==
Rider	Date of birth
Dan Atherton (GBR)	25 January 1982 (age 44)
Gee Atherton (GBR)	26 February 1985 (age 41)
Rachel Atherton (GBR)	6 December 1987 (age 38)
Marc Beaumont (GBR)	25 September 1984 (age 41)
Martin Maes (BEL)	27 January 1997 (age 29)
Taylor Vernon (GBR)	12 September 1996 (age 29)
James Wolf (CAN)	20 March 1993 (age 33)
