= 2008 UCI Mountain Bike & Trials World Championships =

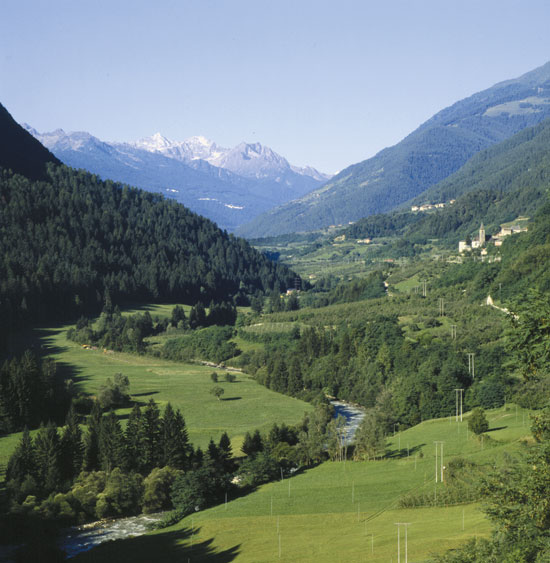
- Venue: Val di Sole, Italy
- Date: 17–22 June 2008
- Events: MTB: 13; Trials: 6

The 2008 UCI Mountain Bike & Trials World Championships were held in Val di Sole, Italy from 17 to 22 June 2008. The disciplines included were cross-country, downhill, four-cross, and trials. The event was the 19th edition of the UCI Mountain Bike World Championships and the 23rd edition of the UCI Trials World Championships.

Future three-time road world champion and seven-time Tour de France points classification winner Peter Sagan won the junior men's cross-country title.

== Medal summary ==
=== Men's events ===
| Event | Gold | Silver | Bronze |
|---|---|---|---|
| Cross-country | Christoph Sauser (SUI) | Florian Vogel (SUI) | Ralph Näf (SUI) |
| Under 23 cross-country | Nino Schurter (SUI) | Burry Stander (RSA) | Matthias Flückiger (SUI) |
| Junior cross-country | Peter Sagan (SVK) | Arnaud Jouffroy (FRA) | Matthias Rupp (SUI) |
| Downhill | Gee Atherton (GBR) | Steve Peat (GBR) | Sam Hill (AUS) |
| Junior downhill | Josh Bryceland (GBR) | Sam Dale (GBR) | Rémi Thirion (FRA) |
| Four-cross | Rafael Alvarez De Lara Lu (ESP) | Roger Rinderknecht (SUI) | Mickael Deldycke (FRA) |
| Trials, 20 inch | Benito Ros Charral (ESP) | Rafal Kumorowski (POL) | Sebastian Hoffmann (GER) |
| Trials, 26 inch | Gilles Coustellier (FRA) | Vincent Hermance (FRA) | Daniel Comas Riera (ESP) |
| Junior trials, 20 inch | Abel Mustieles (ESP) | Loris Braun (SUI) | James Barton (CAN) |
| Junior trials, 26 inch | Loris Braun (SUI) | James Barton (CAN) | Kevin Aglae (FRA) |

=== Women's events ===
| Event | Gold | Silver | Bronze |
|---|---|---|---|
| Cross-country | Margarita Fullana (ESP) | Sabine Spitz (GER) | Irina Kalentieva (RUS) |
| Under 23 cross-country | Tanja Žakelj (SLO) | Nathalie Schneitter (SUI) | Aleksandra Dawidowicz (POL) |
| Junior cross-country | Laura Abril (COL) | Barbara Benkó (HUN) | Mona Eiberweiser (GER) |
| Downhill | Rachel Atherton (GBR) | Sabrina Jonnier (FRA) | Emmeline Ragot (FRA) |
| Junior downhill | Anais Pajot (FRA) | Myriam Nicole (FRA) | Mélanie Pugin (FRA) |
| Four-cross | Melissa Buhl (USA) | Jana Horáková (CZE) | Romana Labounková (CZE) |
| Trials | Gemma Abant Condal (ESP) | Karin Moor (SUI) | Julie Pesenti (FRA) |

=== Team events ===
| Event | Gold | Silver | Bronze |
|---|---|---|---|
| Cross-country | France; Jean-Christophe Péraud; Arnaud Jouffroy; Laurence Leboucher; Alexis Vuillermoz | Switzerland; Florian Vogel; Matthias Rupp; Petra Henzi; Nino Schurter | Italy; Marco Aurelio Fontana; Gerhard Kerschbaumer; Eva Lechner; Cristian Cominelli |
| Trials | Spain | France | Switzerland |

=== Medal table ===
| Rank | Nation | Gold | Silver | Bronze | Total |
|---|---|---|---|---|---|
| 1 | Spain (ESP) | 6 | 0 | 1 | 7 |
| 2 | Switzerland (SUI) | 3 | 6 | 4 | 13 |
| 3 | France (FRA) | 3 | 5 | 6 | 14 |
| 4 | Great Britain (GBR) | 3 | 2 | 0 | 5 |
| 5 | Colombia (COL) | 1 | 0 | 0 | 1 |
| 5 | Slovakia (SVK) | 1 | 0 | 0 | 1 |
| 5 | Slovenia (SLO) | 1 | 0 | 0 | 1 |
| 5 | United States (USA) | 1 | 0 | 0 | 1 |
| 9 | Germany (GER) | 0 | 1 | 2 | 3 |
| 10 | Canada (CAN) | 0 | 1 | 1 | 2 |
| 10 | Czech Republic (CZE) | 0 | 1 | 1 | 2 |
| 10 | Poland (POL) | 0 | 1 | 1 | 2 |
| 13 | Hungary (HUN) | 0 | 1 | 0 | 1 |
| 13 | South Africa (RSA) | 0 | 1 | 0 | 1 |
| 15 | Australia (AUS) | 0 | 0 | 1 | 1 |
| 15 | Italy (ITA) | 0 | 0 | 1 | 1 |
| 15 | Russia (RUS) | 0 | 0 | 1 | 1 |
| Totals (17 entries) | | 19 | 19 | 19 | 57 |

== See also ==
- 2008 UCI Mountain Bike World Cup
- UCI Mountain Bike Marathon World Championships
