= Jacquie Phelan =

American road and cyclocross racer (born 1955)

Jacquie Phelan (born December 10, 1955, in San Francisco, California) is an American road and cyclocross racer, and was the NORBA champion three consecutive years—1983, 1984, and 1985.

Phelan is known through the US mountain bike community for having developed WOMBATS (Women's Mountain Bike & Tea Society) for women interested more in socializing and enjoying nature. Her nickname of "Alice B. Toeclips" is a homage to Alice B. Toklas.

Her bike Otto, was among the first aluminum frames raced, with drop bars off-road, and her creative attire. Phelan is married to Wilderness Trail Bikes founder and component inventor Charlie Cunningham, the bicycle frame builder whose aluminum bike, "Otto," Phelan raced unbeaten for six years. This bike was the first modern lightweight mountain bike, and its heat-treated sloping top tube aluminum frame held up for over nine consecutive seasons. The roller cam brakes, two chainrings (44-34), and custom-fabricated eleven-tooth rear cog gave a boost in technical riding. The bike also drew criticism from traditional framebuilders, who believed durable frames had to be made of steel.

She is a charter inductee into the Mountain Bike Hall of Fame in 1988. In 2000, she was inducted into the United States Bicycling Hall of Fame. Along with a dozen others, Phelan founded NORBA in 1982, and was a charter member of IMBA. Phelan founded the Women's Mountain Bike & Tea Society (WOMBATS) in 1987 to encourage women's and girls' participation, and in 1984 produced the sport's first off-road skills camps & clinics, known as "Fat Tire Finishing School".

Phelan once had the opportunity to ride with Independent Fabrication's racer Amy Crawford, a defining experience for both riders.

Phelan was the first US mountain bike racer to race abroad (Man v. Horse, Wales). In 2004, she placed 8th overall in the Transportugal, a 1300 km offroad adventure race, where she was the only woman. Phelan is still invited to participate in offroad races both stateside and abroad. In summer 2009, she took part in a two-month vodka commercial called the 42 Below ride, a 4,200-mile crossing of the US by road bike.

Phelan appears in three documentary films: Full Cycle: A World Odyssey (1994), How to Cook Your Life (Doris Doerrie's film about Zen baker Edward Espe Brown, 2007), and Billy Savage's Klunkerz.
