= Ot Pi =

Spanish cyclist

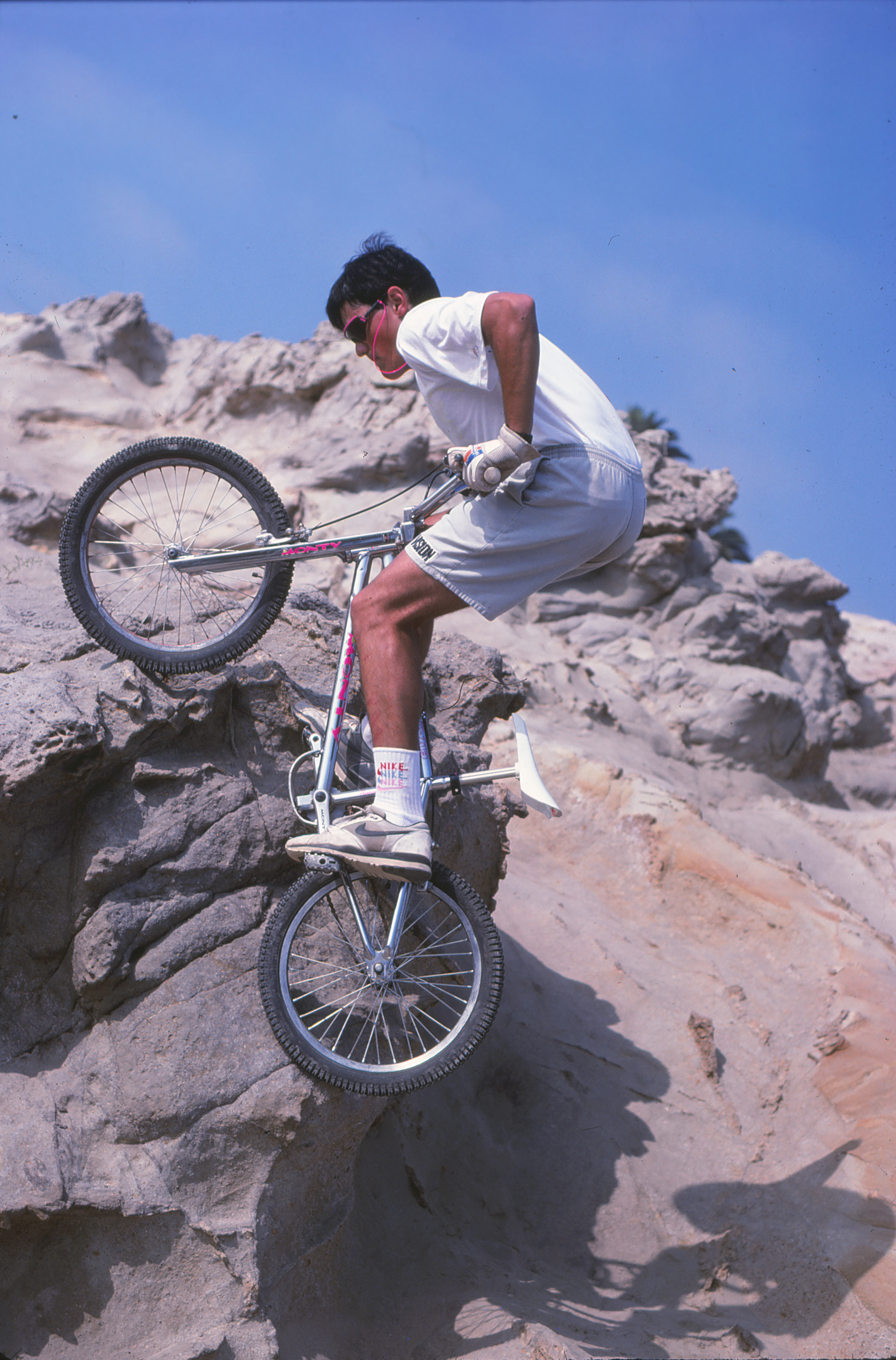
- Ot Pi in California (1988)

Cycling career
- Sport: Cycling
- Discipline: Bike-trials
- Role: Rider

Ot Pi is a Spanish bike-trials rider, often regarded as the man responsible for the discipline's origin. He has won several world titles and is featured on a number of videos that showcase the sport.

== Career ==
Ot Pi (a.k.a. "Hot Pie") Isern made his U.S. debut at the age of 17 at the Mammoth Mountain World Mountain Bike Championships in August 1988 where he easily clinched the Trials competition. His fluid style and signature 360-degree dismount from atop boulders, logs and planks, drew crowds and amazed all onlookers. As Zapata Espinoza wrote in his racing re-cap:

Ot Pi is the current World Champion in Europe, and now in America, too. The quiet rider from Spain rides for Monty, which is his father's bicycle company, and he is the winningest rider in the world today. Ot wow'd the crowd with his ability to clean all the sections he rode. The trials event took over four hours to complete and from beginning to end hundreds of spectators stood back in awe at the accomplishments of the better riders. When the event was through, Ot Pi gave a special performance and twice did an aerial 360-degree full turn off a ten-foot-high log assemblage - incredible!

Several months later, Ot returned to the U.S. as a guest of Trials rider, Kevin Norton. The two were videotaped at Corona del Mar, California on moonscape cliffs above the Pacific Ocean and appeared in a video released in 1988 called Ultimate Mountain Biking: Advanced Techniques & Winning Strategies.

In 1994 Ot Pi appeared in another video entitled Full Cycle: A World Odyssey performing Trials in various locations in and around Athens, Greece, including the Plaka, National Garden of Athens, Acropolis, Parliamentary Building, Olympic Stadium, Christianity Rock and Sounion, known for its temple ruins by the Aegean Sea.

== Current activity ==
The white bicycle (Ghost Bike) is internationally known as the symbol in homage to all the cyclists victims caused by the traffic accidents. Ot Pi's "Ot Pi Play" bicycle /clothes in white are meant to be a matter of conscience to all the riders administrations that the cyclists are easily injured in the traffic and their security must be guaranteed.

In 2020 Ot Pi made a series of videos starring the character OtPiPlay.
