= 2015 UCI Mountain Bike & Trials World Championships =

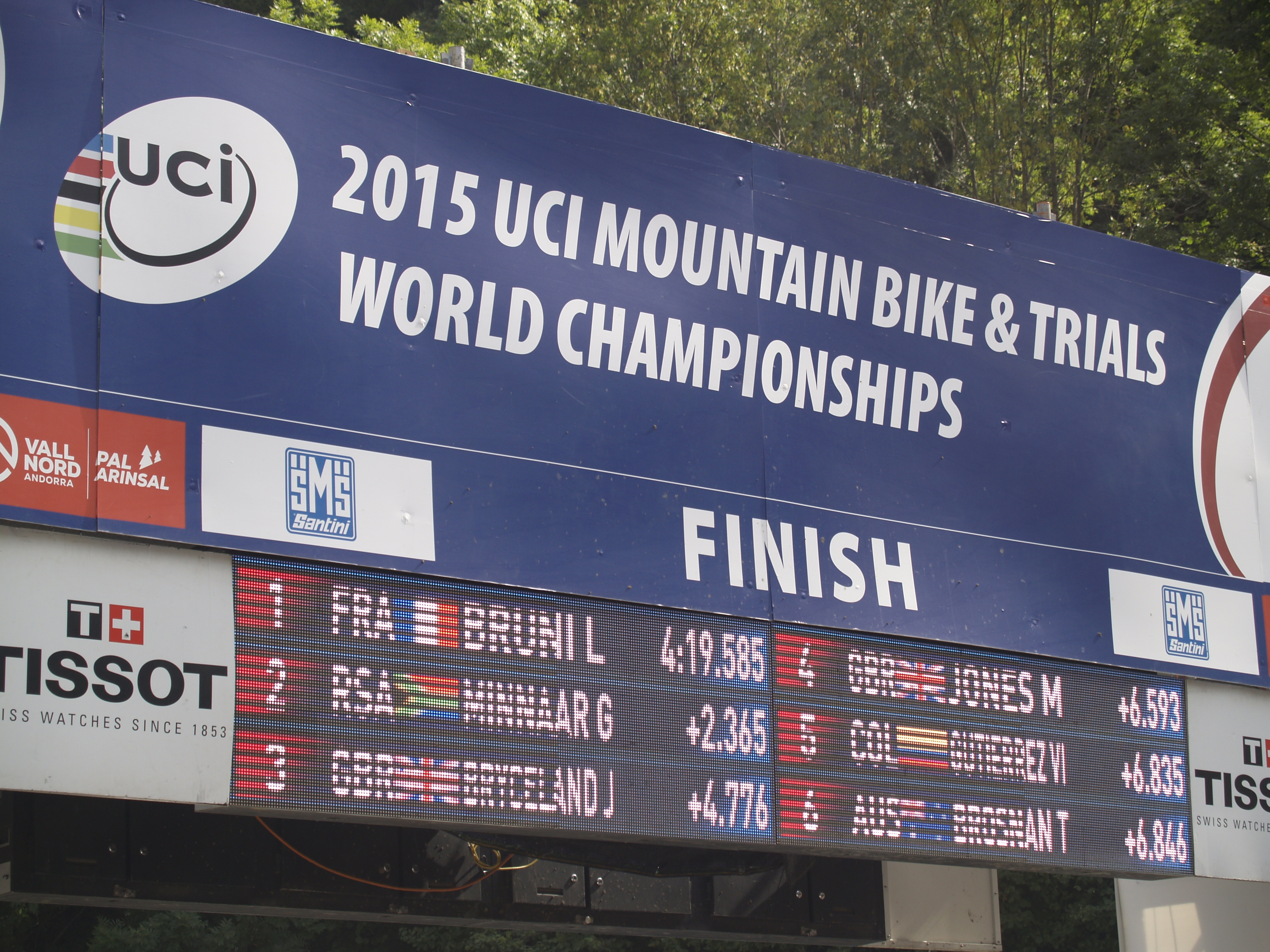
- Scoreboard for the Elite Men's Downhill at the 2015 UCI Mountain Bike & Trials World Championships in Vallnord, Andorra
- Venue: Vallnord, Andorra
- Date(s): 31 August – 6 September 2015
- Events: MTB: 13; Trials: 6

The 2015 UCI Mountain Bike & Trials World Championships was the 26th edition of the UCI Mountain Bike & Trials World Championships, held in Vallnord, Andorra.

== Medal summary ==
=== Men's events ===
Event	Gold	Silver	Bronze
Cross-country	Nino Schurter; Switzerland	Julien Absalon; France	Ondřej Cink; Czech Republic
Under 23 cross-country	Anton Cooper; New Zealand	Victor Koretzky; France	Grant Ferguson; Great Britain
Junior cross-country	Simon Andreassen; Denmark	Maximilian Brandl; Germany	Egan Bernal; Colombia
Cross-country eliminator	Daniel Federspiel; Austria	Sam Gaze; New Zealand	Simon Gegenheimer; Germany
Downhill	Loïc Bruni; France	Greg Minnaar; South Africa	Josh Bryceland; Great Britain
Junior downhill	Laurie Greenland; Great Britain	Martin Meas; Belgium	Jackson Frew; Australia
Trials, 20 inch	Abel Mustieles; Spain	Lucien Leiser; Switzerland	Benito Ros; Spain
Trials, 26 inch	Vincent Hermance; France	Jack Carthy; Great Britain	Kenny Belaey; Belgium
Junior trials, 20 inch	Dominik Oswald; Germany	Sebastián Ruiz; Spain	Johan Buchwalder; Switzerland
Junior trials, 26 inch	Nicolas Vallée; France	Dominik Oswald; Germany	Nicolas Fleury; France

=== Women's events ===
Event	Gold	Silver	Bronze
Cross-country	Pauline Ferrand-Prévot; France	Irina Kalentieva; Russia	Yana Belomoyna; Ukraine
Under 23 cross-country	Ramona Forchini; Switzerland	Olga Terentyeva; Russia	Jenny Rissveds; Sweden
Junior cross-country	Martina Berta; Italy	Evie Richards; Great Britain	Nicole Koller; Switzerland
Cross-country eliminator	Linda Indergand; Switzerland	Ingrid Bøe Jacobsen; Norway	Kathrin Stirnemann; Switzerland
Downhill	Rachel Atherton; Great Britain	Manon Carpenter; Great Britain	Tracey Hannah; Australia
Junior downhill	Marine Cabirou; France	Viktoria Gimenez; France	Lilla Megyaszai; Hungary
Trials	Janine Jungfels; Australia	Tatiana Janíčková; Slovakia	Nina Reichenbach; Germany

=== Team events ===
Event	Gold	Silver	Bronze
Cross-country	France; Victor Koretzky; Jordan Sarrou; Pauline Ferrand-Prévot; Antoine Philipp	Denmark; Simon Andreassen; Niels Rasmussen; Annika Langvad; Sebastian Carstensen Fini	Italy; Marco Aurelio Fontana; Francesco Bonetto; Eva Lechner; Gioele Bertolini
Trials	France; Vincent Hermance; Nicolas Vallée; Manon Basseville; Nicolas Fleury; Benjamin Durville	Switzerland; Lucien Leiser; Loris Braun; Tom Blaser; Jonas Koenig; Debi Studer	Germany; Hannes Hermann; Jannis Oing; Nina Reichenbach; Dominik Oswald; Raphael Pils

== Medal table ==
Rank	Nation	Gold	Silver	Bronze	Total
1	France (FRA)	7	3	1	11
2	Switzerland (SUI)	3	2	3	8
3	Great Britain (GBR)	2	3	2	7
4	Germany (GER)	1	2	3	6
5	Spain (ESP)	1	1	1	3
6	Denmark (DEN)	1	1	0	2
6	New Zealand (NZL)	1	1	0	2
8	Australia (AUS)	1	0	2	3
9	Italy (ITA)	1	0	1	2
10	Austria (AUT)	1	0	0	1
11	Russia (RUS)	0	2	0	2
12	Belgium (BEL)	0	1	1	2
13	Norway (NOR)	0	1	0	1
13	Slovakia (SVK)	0	1	0	1
13	South Africa (RSA)	0	1	0	1
16	Colombia (COL)	0	0	1	1
16	Czech Republic (CZE)	0	0	1	1
16	Hungary (HUN)	0	0	1	1
16	Sweden (SWE)	0	0	1	1
16	Ukraine (UKR)	0	0	1	1
Totals (20 entries)		19	19	19	57

== See also ==
- 2015 UCI Mountain Bike World Cup
