= Felix Beckeman =

Swedish athlete

Personal information
- Nationality: Swedish
- Born: 21 November 1991 (age 34) Sweden

Sport
- Country: Sweden
- Sport: Mountain Biking
- Event: Four-Cross
Medal record
Men's Four-Cross
European Mountain Bike Championships
Gold medal – first place	2012 Poland	Four-Cross
UCI Four-Cross World Championships
Gold medal – first place	2017 Italy	Four-Cross

Felix Beckeman (born in November 21, 1991) is a Swedish athlete who competes in mountain biking with a specificity in cross-country cycling. He was the winner of the gold medal in the Men’s Four-Cross event at the European Mountain Bike Championships in Poland, in 2012.

In 2017, he won the gold medal at the Four-Cross World Championships in Val di Sole Trentino, Italy.

== International Wins ==
European Mountain Bike Championships
Year	Location	Medal	Competition
2012	Szczawno-Zdrój (Poland)	Gold	Men's Four-Cross

UCI Four-Cross World Championships
Year	Location	Medal	Competition
2017	Val di Sole Trentino (Italy)	Gold	Men's Four-Cross
