= Abárzuza =

Coordinates: 42°43′35″N 2°01′21″W

- Coat of arms

- Location in Spain.
- Country: Spain
- Autonomous community: Navarra

Area
  - Total: 23.02 km^{2} (8.89 sq mi)
- Elevation: 569 m (1,867 ft)

Population (2025-01-01)
  - Total: 510
  - Density: 22/km^{2} (57/sq mi)
- Time zone: UTC+1 (CET)
  - Summer (DST): UTC+2 (CEST)
- Website: www.abarzuza.es

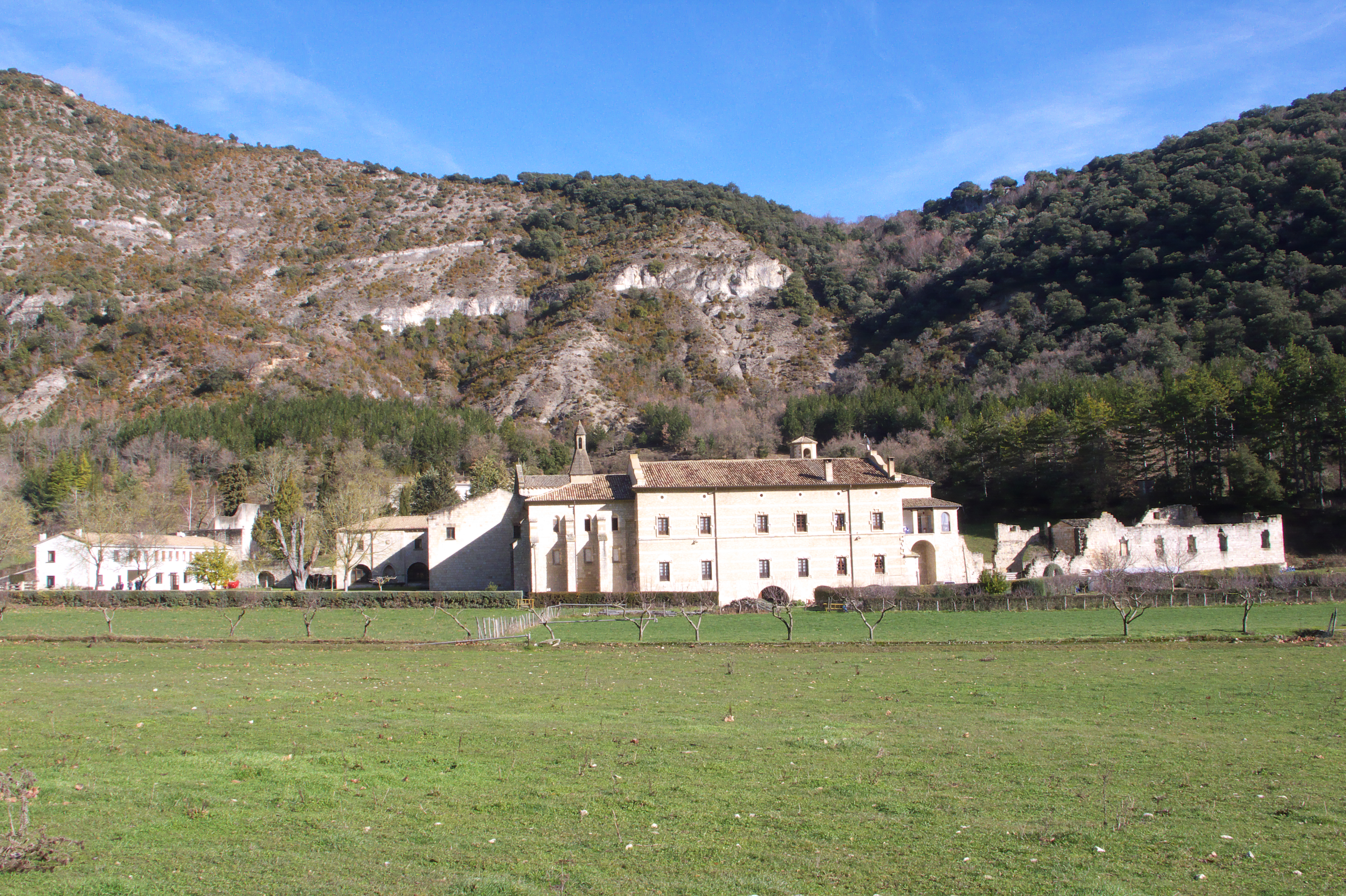
Monastery of Santa María la Real de Iranzu in Abarzuza

Abárzuza (Basque: Abartzuza) is a town and municipality located in the province and autonomous community of Navarre, northern Spain.
