= Brian Lopes =

American mountain bike racer (born 1971)

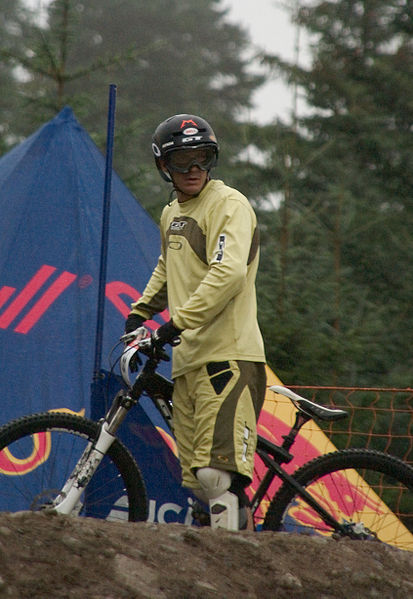
- Lopes at the World Championships in Fort William

Personal information
- Full name: Brian Thomas Lopes
- Nickname: Flyin' Brian
- Born: September 6, 1971 (age 55) Mission Viejo, California, U.S.
- Height: 5 ft 9 in (175 cm)
- Weight: 160 lb (73 kg)

Cycling career
- Sport: Cycling
- Current team: Intense/Maxxis/Pearl Izumi/Lazer/X Fusion
- Disciplines: MTB–Four-cross, dual slalom, enduro, downhill

Professional team
- 1989–2012: –

Major wins
- (United States) NORBA National Championship (1 Wins); UCI World Cup (1 Wins); UCI World Championship (1 wins)

Brian Thomas Lopes (born September 6, 1971) is an American professional mountain bike (MTB) racer who specializes in four-cross. Lopes started riding Bicycle Motocross (BMX) in his childhood and turned professional at seventeen years old.

He started mountain biking in 1993 and has since won a total of 18 titles – 9 NORBA National Championships, 6 UCI World Cup wins and 4 UCI World Championship titles. Nicknamed "Flyin' Brian," Lopes has also held world records in bunny hopping, in terms of both distance and height.

He was nominated in 2001 for an ESPY "Action sport Athlete of the Year" and won two NEA (World Extreme Sports Award) for "Mountain Biker of the Year" in 2000 & 2001. Lopes has also co-written a book, Mastering Mountain Bike Skills with Lee McCormack. Additionally, he appeared as one of the five real-life professional riders unlockable in the 2003 PlayStation 2 racing game Downhill Domination, alongside Eric Carter, Tara Llanes, Richie Schley, and Missy Giove.

Lopes is currently sponsored by Ibis Bicycles, Oakley, Lazer, X-Fusion, SRAM, Kenda, Novatec Wheels, WTB, ODI, Magura, Pearl Izumi, Go Pro, HT, KS, Chris King & MRP.

On April 13, 2012, Lopes won the first race of the new cross-country eliminator World Cup series in Houffalize, Belgium.
