= French National Mountain Bike Championships =

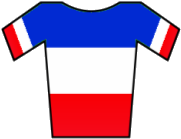
- The champion's jersey

Race details
- Region: France
- Discipline: Mountain biking
- Type: National championship
- Organiser: French Cycling Federation

History
- First edition: 1992
- Editions: 29 (as of 2020)

The French National Mountain Bike Championships are held annually to decide the cycling champions in the mountain biking discipline, across various categories.

== Men ==
=== Cross-country ===
==== Elite ====
Year	Winner	Second	Third
1992	Bruno Lebras		
1993	Zbigniew Krasniak		
1994	Ludovic Dubau		
1995	Jean-Christophe Savignoni		
1996	Miguel Martinez		
1997	Cyrille Bonnand	Miguel Martinez	Ludovic Dubau
1998	Christophe Dupouey		
1999	Jérôme Chiotti	Miguel Martinez	Fabrice Julien
2000	Thomas Dietsch	Gaël Perry	Frédéric Frech
2001	Jérôme Chiotti	Jean-Christophe Péraud	Cyrille Bonnand
2002	Christophe Dupouey	Jérôme Chiotti	Jean-Christophe Péraud
2003	Julien Absalon	Miguel Martinez	Jean-Christophe Péraud
2004	Julien Absalon	Peter Pouly	Cédric Ravanel
2005	Julien Absalon	Jean-Christophe Péraud	Peter Pouly
2006	Julien Absalon	Cédric Ravanel	Pierre Lebreton
2007	Julien Absalon	Cédric Ravanel	Jean-Christophe Péraud
2008	Julien Absalon	Jean-Christophe Péraud	Cédric Ravanel
2009	Julien Absalon	Jean-Christophe Péraud	Cédric Ravanel
2010	Julien Absalon	Maxime Marotte	Stéphane Tempier
2011	Julien Absalon	Maxime Marotte	Stéphane Tempier
2012	Julien Absalon	Stéphane Tempier	Maxime Marotte
2013	Julien Absalon	Miguel Martinez	Maxime Marotte
2014	Julien Absalon	Hugo Drechou	Stéphane Tempier
2015	Julien Absalon	Maxime Marotte	Jordan Sarrou
2016	Julien Absalon	Maxime Marotte	Stéphane Tempier
2017	Maxime Marotte	Titouan Carod	Stéphane Tempier
2018	Titouan Carod	Victor Koretzky	Maxime Marotte
2019	Victor Koretzky	Jordan Sarrou	Titouan Carod
2020	Jordan Sarrou	Titouan Carod	Thomas Griot

==== Under-23 ====
Year	Winner	Second	Third
2000	Cédric Ravanel		
2001	Julien Absalon	Yohann Vachette	Sébastien Hansen
2002	Julien Absalon		
2003	Nicolas Philippi	Alexandre Blain	Charles Henri Demaret
2004	Julien Montaron	Romain De Waele	Yannick Rannou
2005	François Bailly-Maître	Pierre-Geoffroy Plantet	Nicolas Bazin
2006	Stéphane Tempier		
2007	Stéphane Tempier	Marc Colom	François Bailly-Maître
2008	Maxime Marotte		
2009	Alexis Vuillermoz		
2010	Alexis Vuillermoz		
2011	Fabien Canal		
2012	Jordan Sarrou		
2013	Julien Trarieux	Hugo Drechou	Jordan Sarrou
2014	Jordan Sarrou	Victor Koretzky	Titouan Carod
2015	Titouan Carod	Victor Koretzky	Romain Seigle
2016	Victor Koretzky	Titouan Carod	Antoine Bouqueret
2017	Neïlo Perrin-Ganier	Hugo Briatta	Maxime Loret
2018	Joshua Dubau	Axel Zingle	Thibault Daniel
2019	Antoine Philipp	Thomas Bonnet	Loan Cheneval
2020	Mathis Azzaro	Loan Cheneval	Basile Allard

==== Juniors ====
Year	Winner	Second	Third
1992	Nicolas Gomord	David Rolandez	Alexandre Balaud
1998	Julien Absalon		
2001	Thibaut Legastelois		
2002	Fabien Manf		
2003	Clément Lhotellerie	François Bailly Maitre	Guillaume Fabry
2004			
2005	Olivier Sarrazin		Alexis Vuillermoz
2006	Alexis Vuillermoz		
2007	Fabien Canal	Gilles Sarrazin	Anthony Rodeville
2008	Arnaud Jouffroy		
2009	Jordan Sarrou	Titouan Perrin Ganier	
2010	Julien Trarieux		
2011	Victor Koretzky		
2012	Titouan Carod		
2013	Raphaël Gay	Romain Boutet	Hugo Pigeon
2014	Hugo Pigeon	Joshua Dubau	Antoine Philipp
2015	Thibault Daniel	Antoine Philipp	Simon Gourc
2016	Clément Champoussin	Benjamin Le Ny	Axel Zingle
2017	Benjamin Le Ny	Maxime Limousin	Mathis Azzaro
2018	Hugo Peyroux	Loan Cheneval	Pierre Chabaud
2019	Luca Martin	Esteban Bagnon	Mathis Guay
2020	Mathis Guay	Mateo Chedaleux	Lucas Grieco

=== Cross-country eliminator ===
Year	Winner	Second	Third
2013	Titouan Perrin-Ganier	Kévin Miquel	Louison Berthelot
2014	Titouan Perrin-Ganier	Fabien Canal	Guillaume Guilbaud
2015	Titouan Perrin-Ganier	Anthony Pautonnier	Kévin Miquel
2016	Titouan Perrin-Ganier	Adrian Cayrel	Simon Rogier
2017	Titouan Perrin-Ganier	Eddy Steible	Louison Berthelot
2018	Titouan Perrin-Ganier	Hugo Briatta	Lorenzo Serres
2019	Hugo Briatta	Titouan Perrin-Ganier	Joshua Dubau
2020	Titouan Perrin-Ganier	Quentin Schrotzenberger	Hugo Briatta

=== E-Bike Cross-country ===
Year	Winner	Second	Third
2018	Julien Absalon	Neïlo Perrin-Ganier	Miguel Martinez
2019	Jérôme Gilloux	Julien Absalon	Miguel Martinez
2020	Jérôme Gilloux	Natan Patrois	Valentin Remondet

=== Marathon ===
Year	Winner	Second	Third
2003	Jean-Christophe Péraud	Jérôme Chevallier	Pierre Lebreton
2004	Peter Pouly	Jean-Christophe Péraud	Alexis Svetloff
2005	Peter Pouly		
2006	Thomas Dietsch		
2008	Thomas Dietsch		
2009	Thomas Dietsch	Frédéric Frech	Pierre-Yves Facomprez
2010	Maxime Marotte	François Bailly-Maître	Paul Rémy
2011	Thomas Dietsch	Grégory Pascal	Arnaud Grosjean
2012	Thomas Dietsch		
2013	Thomas Dietsch	Guillaume Bonnafond	
2014	Thomas Dietsch	Maxime Marotte	Stéphane Tempier
2015	Maxime Marotte	Hugo Drechou	Émilien Mourier
2016	Frédéric Gombert	Rémi Laffont	Alexis Chenevier
2017	Miguel Martinez	Antonin Marecail	Emeric Turcat
2018	Emeric Turcat	Alexis Paris	Arnold Jeannesson
2019	Pierre Billaud	Axel Roudil Cortinat	Hugo Drechou
2020	Hugo Drechou	Joshua Dubau	Thomas Champion

=== Downhill ===
==== Elite ====
Year	Winner	Second	Third
1994	Nicolas Vouilloz		
1995	Cédric Gracia		
1996	Nicolas Vouilloz		
1997	Nicolas Vouilloz		
1998	Cédric Gracia		
1999	Nicolas Vouilloz	Mickaël Pascal	Franck Parolin
2000	Philippe Keller	Matthieu Prost	Stéphane Jany
2001	Nicolas Vouilloz	Cédric Gracia	Karim Amour
2002	Fabien Barel	Cyril Lagneau	Julien Camellini
2003	Cyril Lagneau	Mickaël Deldycke	Fréderic Midey
2004	Yoann Barelli	Florent Payet	Vincent Saut
2005	Fabien Barel	Maxime Remy	Yoann Barelli
2006	Fabien Barel	Mickaël Pascal	Julien Camellini
2007	Fabien Barel	Fabien Pedemanaud	Damien Spagnolo
2008	Mickaël Pascal	Julien Camellini	Florent Payet
2009	Fabien Barel	Mickael Pascal	Fabien Pedemanaud
2010	Romain Paulhan	Damien Spagnolo	Mickaël Pascal
2011	Mickaël Pascal	Damien Spagnolo	Rémi Thirion
2012	Pierre-Charles Georges	Cyrille Kurtz	Patrick Thome
2013	Loïc Bruni	Rémi Thirion	Florent Payet
2014	Loïc Bruni	Aurélien Giordanengo	Faustin Figaret
2015	Loïc Bruni	Amaury Pierron	Patrick Thome
2016	Thibaut Ruffin	Amaury Pierron	Florent Payet
2017	Loïc Bruni	Amaury Pierron	Loris Vergier
2018	Gaëtan Vigé	Valentin Clément	Simon Cardon
2019	Thibaut Dapréla	Rémi Thirion	Baptiste Pierron
2020	Benoît Coulanges	Loïc Bruni	Loris Vergier

==== Juniors ====
Year	Winner	Second	Third
2005	Félix-Firmin Roth		
2007	Rémi Thirion		
2008	Rémi Thirion		
2009	Patrick Thome		
2010	Ludovic Oget		
2011	Loïc Bruni		
2012	Félix Racaud		
2013	Loris Vergier	Amaury Pierron	Benjamin Boutié
2014	Loris Vergier	Amaury Pierron	Benjamin Boutié
2015	Thibault Laly	Benoît Cougoureux	Gaëtan Vigé
2016	Gaëtan Vigé	Sylvain Cougoureux	Kévin Marry
2017	Sylvain Cougoureux	Antoine Pierron	Hugo Frixtalon
2018	Jérémy Langlade	Matis Escalier	Nathan Paillard
2019	Thibaut Dapréla	Louis Gaillet	Eliot Rossignol
2020	Simon Chapelet	Eliot Rossignol	Antoine Rogge

=== Trials ===
Year	Winner	Second	Third
2001		Giacomo Coustellier	
2002	Giacomo Coustellier	Kenny Lecorre	
2003	Giacomo Coustellier	Vincent Hermance	
2004	Gilles Coustellier	Giacomo Coustellier	Vincent Hermance
2005	Vincent Hermance		Giacomo Coustellier
2006	Giacomo Coustellier	Vincent Hermance	
2007	Vincent Hermance	Guillaume Dunand	Florian Tournier
2008	Gilles Coustellier	Giacomo Coustellier	Vincent Hermance
2009	Gilles Coustellier	Vincent Hermance	
2010	Gilles Coustellier	Vincent Hermance	
2011	Gilles Coustellier	Vincent Hermance	
2012	Gilles Coustellier	Vincent Hermance	
2013	Gilles Coustellier	Vincent Hermance	Aurélien Fontenoy
2014	Kévin Aglaé	Vincent Hermance	Gilles Coustellier
2015	Vincent Hermance	Nicolas Vallée	Alexis Brunetaud
2016	Vincent Hermance	Aurélien Fontenoy	Gilles Coustellier
2017	Nicolas Vallée	Vincent Hermance	Gilles Coustellier
2018	Nicolas Vallée	Vincent Hermance	Clément Meot
2019	Nicolas Vallée	Gilles Coustellier	Aurélien Fontenoy
2020	Noah Cardona	Vincent Hermance	Gilles Coustellier

=== Beach race ===
Year	Winner	Second	Third
2019	Samuel Leroux	Alexis Delaleau	Charles Antoine Dourlens

=== Four cross ===
Year	Winner	Second	Third
2007	Mickaël Deldycke		
2008	Romain Saladini		
2009	Aurélien Giordanengo		
2010			
2011	Romain Saladini		
2012	Aurélien Giordanengo		

== Women ==
=== Cross-country ===
==== Elite ====
Year	Winner	Second	Third
1994	Jeannie Longo		
1995	Nathalie Fiat		
1996	Laurence Leboucher	Sandra Temporelli	
1997	Sandra Temporelli	Sophie Eglin-Hosotte	Sophie Villeneuve
1998	Laurence Leboucher	Sophie Villeneuve	Sandra Temporelli
1999	Laurence Leboucher	Sophie Villeneuve	Sandra Temporelli
2000	Laurence Leboucher	Sophie Villeneuve	Sandra Temporelli
2001	Virginie Souchon	Sabrina Enaux	Sonia Clolus
2002	Laurence Leboucher	Marion Thévenet	Séverine Hansen
2003	Séverine Hansen	Marion Thévenet	Virginie Souchon
2004	Séverine Hansen	Sabrina Enaux	Sabine Gentieu
2005	Séverine Hansen	Maryline Salvetat	Sabine Gentieu
2006	Laurence Leboucher	Séverine Hansen	Sabrina Enaux
2007	Laurence Leboucher	Sabrina Enaux	Christel Ferrier-Bruneau
2008	Cécile Ravanel	Laura Metzler	Hélène Marcouyre
2009	Cécile Ravanel	Sabrina Enaux	Caroline Mani
2010	Julie Bresset	Laura Metzler	Cécile Ravanel
2011	Julie Bresset	Sabrina Enaux	Laura Metzler
2012	Julie Bresset	Lucie Chainel	Sabrina Enaux
2013	Julie Bresset	Pauline Ferrand-Prévot	Sabrina Enaux
2014	Pauline Ferrand-Prévot	Margot Moschetti	Laura Metzler
2015	Pauline Ferrand-Prévot	Perrine Clauzel	Margot Moschetti
2016	Pauline Ferrand-Prévot	Sabrina Enaux	Estelle Boudot
2017	Pauline Ferrand-Prévot	Sabrina Enaux	Lucie Urruty
2018	Pauline Ferrand-Prévot	Lucie Urruty	Julie Bresset
2019	Pauline Ferrand-Prévot	Lucie Urruty	Julie Bresset
2020	Léna Gérault	Loana Lecomte	Pauline Ferrand-Prévot

==== Under-23 ====
Year	Winner	Second	Third
2001	Marion Thévenet	Hélène Marcouyre	Séverine Hansen
2005	Bérangère Wilst	Laura Metzler	Olivia Cascino
2006	Laura Metzler		
2007	Laura Metzler		
2008	Laura Metzler		
2009	Caroline Mani		
2010	Julie Bresset		
2011	Julie Bresset		
2012	Pauline Ferrand-Prévot		
2013	Pauline Ferrand-Prévot	Perrine Clauzel	Margot Moschetti
2014	Pauline Ferrand-Prévot	Margot Moschetti	Perrine Clauzel
2015	Perrine Clauzel	Margot Moschetti	Lena Gerault
2016	Perrine Clauzel	Audrey Menut	Lena Gerault
2017	Lucie Urruty	Hélène Clauzel	Lena Gerault
2018	Lucie Urruty	Hélène Clauzel	Loana Lecomte
2019	Loana Lecomte	Hélène Clauzel	Isaure Medde
2020	Loana Lecomte	Hélène Clauzel	Manon Wimmer

==== Juniors ====
Year	Winner	Second	Third
2001	Maureen Guichardot		
2004	Laura Metzler		
2006	Julie Krasniak		
2007	Julie Bresset		
2008	Camille Devi		
2009	Julie Berteaux		
2010	Cécile Delaire		
2011	Perrine Clauzel		
2012	Margot Moschetti		
2013	Audrey Menut	Lucie Urruty	Lena Gerault
2014	Laure Souty	Cléa Cochelin	Clara Donneger
2015	Cléa Cochelin	Guylaine Ducol	Manon Wimmer
2016	Loana Lecomte	Hélène Clauzel	Constance Valentin
2017	Loana Lecomte	Isaure Medde	Justine Tonso
2018	Isaure Medde	Justine Tonso	Pasquine Vandermouten
2019	Pasquine Vandermouten	Lauriane Duraffourg	Léa Bouilloux

=== Cross-country eliminator ===
Year	Winner	Second	Third
2013	Cécile Ravanel	Pauline Ferrand-Prévot	Lucie Chainel
2014	Anaïs Simon	Cécile Delaire	Marine Strappazzon
2015	Perrine Clauzel	Lucie Urruty	Clara Donneger
2016	Lucie Urruty	Charlotte Bacquaert	Clara Donneger
2017	Perrine Clauzel	Coline Clauzure	Ilona Peltier
2018	Coline Clauzure	Perrine Clauzel	Anaïs Grimault
2019	Isaure Medde	Anaïs Grimault	Coline Clauzure
2020	Manon Wimmer	Coline Clauzure	Laurie Vezie

=== E-Bike Cross-country ===
Year	Winner	Second	Third
2018	Nadine Sapin	Coline Clauzure	Sandrine Koenig
2019	Pauline Ferrand-Prévot	Coline Clauzure	Laura Morque
2020	Sandrine Koenig	Karine Temporelli	Camille Defossez

=== Marathon ===
Year	Winner	Second	Third
2006	Virginie Souchon		
2007	Hélène Marcouyre		
2009	Danièle Troesch	Laura Joubert	Idriel Herveet
2010	Hélène Marcouyre	Fanny Bourdon	Coralie Redelsperger
2011	Hélène Marcouyre	Coralie Redelsperger	Danièle Troesch
2012	Fanny Bourdon		
2013	Fanny Bourdon	Hélène Marcouyre	Sandrine Ponsard
2014	Margot Moschetti	Coralie Redelsperger	Hélène Marcouyre
2015	Julie Bresset	Sabrina Enaux	Hélène Marcouyre
2016	Hélène Marcouyre	Muriel Bouhet	Fanny Bourdon
2017	Camille Devi	Muriel Bouhet	Sandrine Koenig
2018	Margot Moschetti	Marion Colin	Coline Clauzure
2019	Léna Gérault	Margot Moschetti	Emma Terrigeol
2020	Léna Gérault	Margot Moschetti	Pauline Ferrand-Prévot

=== Downhill ===
==== Elite ====
Year	Winner	Second	Third
1994	Anne-Caroline Chausson		
1995	Anne-Caroline Chausson		
1996	Anne-Caroline Chausson	Carole Grange	
1997	Anne-Caroline Chausson	Sabrina Jonnier	Carole Grange
1998	Anne-Caroline Chausson		
1999	Anne-Caroline Chausson	Sabrina Jonnier	Céline Gros
2000	Sabrina Jonnier	Nolvenn Le Caer	Céline Gros
2001	Céline Gros	Nolvenn Le Caer	Laëtitia Le Corguillé
2002	Anne-Caroline Chausson	Sabrina Jonnier	Emmeline Ragot
2003	Emmeline Ragot	Nolvenn Le Caer	Estelle Vuillemin
2004	Nolvenn Le Caer	Audrey Le Corguillé	Estelle Vuillemin
2005	Anne-Caroline Chausson	Nolvenn Le Caer	Emmeline Ragot
2006	Emmeline Ragot	Céline Gros	Floriane Pugin
2007	Sabrina Jonnier	Céline Gros	Anaïs Pajot
2008	Emmeline Ragot	Floriane Pugin	Sabrina Jonnier
2009	Céline Gros	Sabrina Jonnier	Floriane Pugin
2010	Sabrina Jonnier	Floriane Pugin	Emmeline Ragot
2011	Myriam Nicole	Emmeline Ragot	Sabrina Jonnier
2012	Emmeline Ragot	Morgane Charre	Myriam Nicole
2013	Floriane Pugin	Myriam Nicole	Emmeline Ragot
2014	Myriam Nicole	Emmeline Ragot	Viktoria Gimenez
2015	Emmeline Ragot	Morgane Charre	Myriam Nicole
2016	Myriam Nicole	Morgane Charre	Marine Cabirou
2017	Myriam Nicole	Marine Cabirou	Linda Jager
2018	Fiona Ourdouillié	Adelina Fontaine	Myriam Nicole
2019	Marine Cabirou	Mélanie Chappaz	Agnès Delest
2020	Myriam Nicole	Marine Cabirou	Agnès Delest

==== Juniors ====
Year	Winner	Second	Third
2012	Fiona Ourdouillie		
2013	Viktoria Gimenez	Fiona Ourdouillie	Marine Cabirou
2014	Viktoria Gimenez	Marine Cabirou	Anastasia Maurice
2015	Linda Jager	Viktoria Gimenez	Flora Lesoin
2016	Flora Lesoin	Nastasia Gimenez	Mélanie Chappaz
2017	Nastasia Gimenez	Mélanie Chappaz	Tina Gozzi
2018	Leane Chardonnieras	Nastasia Gimenez	Lauryne Chappaz
2019	Nastasia Gimenez	Léona Pierrini	Tina Gozzi
2020	Léona Pierrini	Lisa Bouladou	Alizes Lassus

=== Trials ===
Year	Winner	Second	Third
2007	Julie Pesenti	Soizic Blanchard	Marion Porcher
2008	Julie Pesenti	Marion Porcher	Lucie Miramond
2009	Julie Pesenti		Aude Salord
2010	Clémence Bonnand		
2011	Marion Porcher		
2012	Marion Porcher		
2013	Marion Porcher	Florianne Guillon	Marie Dumas
2014	Marion Porcher	Manon Basseville	Mailys Jouy
2015	Manon Basseville	Pauline Bourgeais	Marie Dumas
2016	Manon Basseville	Julia Gisonno	Mailys Jouy
2017	Manon Basseville	Chloé Jourdan	Mailys Jouy
2018	Manon Basseville	Mailys Jouy	Chloé Jourdan
2019	Manon Basseville	Chloé Jourdan	Emma Louineau
2020	Manon Basseville	Chloé Jourdan	Emma Louineau

=== Beach race ===
Year	Winner	Second	Third
2019	Lauriane Meyers	Charlotte Petit	Nathalie Marquiset

== See also ==
- French National Road Race Championships
- French National Time Trial Championships
- French National Cyclo-cross Championships
