= 2016 UCI Mountain Bike World Cup =

Sports season in Highland, Scotland

- Date: April–September 2016

The 2016 UCI Mountain Bike World Cup was a series of races in two disciplines: Olympic Cross-Country (XCO) and Downhill (DHI). The cross-country series had six rounds and the downhill series had seven rounds.

== Cross-country ==
=== Elite ===
Date	Venue	Podium (Men)	Podium (Women)
24 April	(Australia) Cairns	(Switzerland) Nino Schurter	(Denmark) Annika Langvad
24 April	(Australia) Cairns	(France) Maxime Marotte	(Switzerland) Linda Indergand
24 April	(Australia) Cairns	(France) Julien Absalon	(Australia) Rebecca Henderson
22 May	(Germany) Albstadt	(Switzerland) Nino Schurter	(Denmark) Annika Langvad
22 May	(Germany) Albstadt	(France) Julien Absalon	(Sweden) Jenny Rissveds
22 May	(Germany) Albstadt	(France) Maxime Marotte	(Canada) Catharine Pendrel
29 May	(France) La Bresse	(France) Julien Absalon	(Switzerland) Jolanda Neff
29 May	(France) La Bresse	(France) Maxime Marotte	(Canada) Catharine Pendrel
29 May	(France) La Bresse	(France) Victor Koretzky	(Canada) Emily Batty
10 July	(Switzerland) Lenzerheide	(Switzerland) Nino Schurter	(Sweden) Jenny Rissveds
10 July	(Switzerland) Lenzerheide	(France) Julien Absalon	(Denmark) Annika Langvad
10 July	(Switzerland) Lenzerheide	(France) Maxime Marotte	(Switzerland) Jolanda Neff
7 August	(Canada) Mont-Sainte-Anne	(France) Julien Absalon	(Canada) Catharine Pendrel
7 August	(Canada) Mont-Sainte-Anne	(France) Victor Koretzky	(Norway) Gunn-Rita Dahle Flesjå
7 August	(Canada) Mont-Sainte-Anne	(Switzerland) Mathias Flückiger	(Canada) Emily Batty
4 September	(Andorra) Vallnord	(France) Julien Absalon	(Switzerland) Jolanda Neff
4 September	(Andorra) Vallnord	(Czech Republic) Ondrej Cink	(Norway) Gunn-Rita Dahle Flesjå
4 September	(Andorra) Vallnord	(Spain) Pablo Rodriguez Guede	(Canada) Catharine Pendrel

=== Under 23 ===
Date	Venue	Podium (Men)	Podium (Women)
24 April	(Australia) Cairns	(New Zealand) Sam Gaze	(United States) Kate Courtney
24 April	(Australia) Cairns	(France) Romain Seigle	(Canada) Catherine Fleury
24 April	(Australia) Cairns	(France) Titouan Carod	(Russia) Olga Terentyeva
21–22 May	(Germany) Albstadt	(New Zealand) Sam Gaze	(Switzerland) Sina Frei
21–22 May	(Germany) Albstadt	(France) Titouan Carod	(United Kingdom) Evie Richards
21–22 May	(Germany) Albstadt	(Italy) Marcel Guerrini	(Netherlands) Anne Tauber
28–29 May	(France) La Bresse	(France) Titouan Carod	(Switzerland) Sina Frei
28–29 May	(France) La Bresse	(France) Romain Seigle	(United Kingdom) Evie Richards
28–29 May	(France) La Bresse	(New Zealand) Sam Gaze	(Netherlands) Anne Tauber
10 July	(Switzerland) Lenzerheide	(France) Titouan Carod	(Switzerland) Sina Frei
10 July	(Switzerland) Lenzerheide	(Denmark) Simon Andreassen	(United States) Kate Courtney
10 July	(Switzerland) Lenzerheide	(New Zealand) Sam Gaze	(Netherlands) Anne Tauber
7 August	(Canada) Mont-Sainte-Anne	(France) Titouan Carod	(Switzerland) Sina Frei
7 August	(Canada) Mont-Sainte-Anne	(France) Antoine Bouqueret	(Netherlands) Anne Tauber
7 August	(Canada) Mont-Sainte-Anne	(Germany) Lukas Baum	(Italy) Chiara Teocchi
4 September	(Andorra) Vallnord	(Italy) Marcel Guerrini	(Switzerland) Sina Frei
4 September	(Andorra) Vallnord	(Denmark) Simon Andreassen	(Netherlands) Anne Tauber
4 September	(Andorra) Vallnord	(France) Titouan Carod	(Switzerland) Nicole Koller

== Downhill ==
Date	Venue	Podium (Men)	Podium (Women)	Podium (Juniors)
9–10 April	(France) Lourdes	(United States) Aaron Gwin	(United Kingdom) Rachel Atherton	(Canada) Finnley Iles
9–10 April	(France) Lourdes	(Canada) Steve Smith	(United Kingdom) Tahnee Seagrave	(United Kingdom) Matt Walker
9–10 April	(France) Lourdes	(United Kingdom) Danny Hart	(United Kingdom) Manon Carpenter	(United States) Nik Nestoroff
22–23 April	(Australia) Cairns	(France) Loïc Bruni	(United Kingdom) Rachel Atherton	(United Kingdom) Matt Walker
22–23 April	(Australia) Cairns	(Australia) Troy Brosnan	(Australia) Tracey Hannah	(Australia) Remy Morton
22–23 April	(Australia) Cairns	(Australia) Michael Hannah	(United Kingdom) Manon Carpenter	(Australia) Harry Bush
4–5 June	(United Kingdom) Fort William	(South Africa) Greg Minnaar	(United Kingdom) Rachel Atherton	(Canada) Finnley Iles
4–5 June	(United Kingdom) Fort William	(United States) Aaron Gwin	(Australia) Tracey Hannah	(France) Gaëtan Vige
4–5 June	(United Kingdom) Fort William	(United Kingdom) Danny Hart	(United Kingdom) Manon Carpenter	(Australia) Jackson Frew
11–12 June	(Austria) Leogang	(United States) Aaron Gwin	(United Kingdom) Rachel Atherton	(France) Gaëtan Vige
11–12 June	(Austria) Leogang	(France) Loris Vergier	(United Kingdom) Tahnee Seagrave	(Canada) Finnley Iles
11–12 June	(Austria) Leogang	(Australia) Troy Brosnan	(Canada) Miranda Miller	(France) Sylvain Cougoureux
8–9 July	(Switzerland) Lenzerheide	(United Kingdom) Danny Hart	(United Kingdom) Rachel Atherton	(Canada) Finnley Iles
8–9 July	(Switzerland) Lenzerheide	(United States) Aaron Gwin	(United Kingdom) Tahnee Seagrave	(United Kingdom) Elliott Heap
8–9 July	(Switzerland) Lenzerheide	(South Africa) Greg Minnaar	(France) Myriam Nicole	(France) Gaëtan Vige
5–6 August	(Canada) Mont-Sainte-Anne	(United Kingdom) Danny Hart	(United Kingdom) Rachel Atherton	(France) Gaëtan Vige
5–6 August	(Canada) Mont-Sainte-Anne	(United States) Aaron Gwin	(Australia) Tracey Hannah	(Canada) Finnley Iles
5–6 August	(Canada) Mont-Sainte-Anne	(France) Loïc Bruni	(United Kingdom) Tahnee Seagrave	(United Kingdom) Elliott Heap
2–3 September	(Andorra) Vallnord	(United Kingdom) Danny Hart	(United Kingdom) Rachel Atherton	(France) Gaëtan Vige
2–3 September	(Andorra) Vallnord	(South Africa) Greg Minnaar	(Australia) Tracey Hannah	(Canada) Finnley Iles
2–3 September	(Andorra) Vallnord	(France) Loïc Bruni	(France) Myriam Nicole	(United Kingdom) Elliott Heap

== Series classification ==
=== Men ===
Cross-country
Pos	Rider	Points
1.	(France) Julien Absalon	1310
2.	(Switzerland) Nino Schurter	980
3.	(France) Maxime Marotte	948
4.	(France) Viktor Koretzky	596
5.	(Switzerland) Mathias Flückiger	563
6.	(Switzerland) Matthias Stirnemann	550
7.	(France) Jordan Sarrou	541
8.	(Spain) David Valero	538
9.	(Czech Republic) Ondřej Cink	525
10.	(Switzerland) Florian Vogel	490

Under-23 cross-country
Pos	Rider	Points
1.	(France) Titouan Carod	460
2.	(New Zealand) Sam Gaze	300
3.	(Switzerland) Marcel Guerrini	235
4.	(Denmark) Simon Andreassen	230
5.	(France) Antoine Bouqueret	198
6.	(France) Romain Seigle	185
7.	(Switzerland) Andri Frischknecht	151
8.	(Netherlands) Milan Vader	140
9.	(Denmark) Sebastian Carstensen Fini	123
10.	(Germany) Maximilian Brandl	107

Downhill
Pos	Athletes	Points
1.	(United States) Aaron Gwin	1252
2.	(United Kingdom) Danny Hart	1226
3.	(Australia) Troy Brosnan	1031
4.	(South Africa) Greg Minnaar	927
5.	(Australia) Connor Fearon	664
6.	(France) Loïc Bruni	638
7.	(France) Loris Vergier	613
8.	(France) Rémi Thirion	566
9.	(United States) Luca Shaw	546
10.	(United Kingdom) Adam Brayton	531

Junior downhill
Pos	Athletes	Points
1.	(Canada) Finnley Iles	300
2.	(France) Gaëtan Vige	285
3.	(United Kingdom) Elliott Heap	170
4.	(United Kingdom) Matt Walker	120
5.	(United States) Nikolas Nesteroff	111
6.	(France) Sylvain Cougoureux	104
7.	(Australia) Jackson Frew	101
8.	(Australia) Remy Morton	77
9.	(Canada) Magnus Manson	64
10.	(Australia) Harry Bush	50

=== Women ===
Cross-country
Pos	Rider	Points
1.	(Canada) Catharine Pendrel	1030
2.	(Denmark) Annika Langvad	1006
3.	(Canada) Emily Batty	710
4.	(Sweden) Jenny Rissveds	700
5.	(Norway) Gunn-Rita Dahle Flesjå	694
6.	(Switzerland) Jolanda Neff	660
7.	(Czech Republic) Kateřina Nash	630
8.	(Switzerland) Linda Indergand	583
9.	(Australia) Rebecca Henderson	561
10.	(United States) Lea Davison	523

Under-23 cross-country
Pos	Rider	Points
1.	(Switzerland) Sina Frei	450
2.	(United States) Kate Courtney	330
3.	(Netherlands) Anne Tauber	320
4.	(United Kingdom) Evie Richards	191
5.	(Switzerland) Nicole Koller	187
6.	(Switzerland) Ramona Forchini	146
7.	(Italy) Chiara Teocchi	140
8.	(Canada) Catherine Fleury	110
9.	(France) Lena Gerault	108
10.	(Switzerland) Andrea Waldis	101

Downhill
Pos	Athletes	Points
1.	(United Kingdom) Rachel Atherton	1700
2.	(United Kingdom) Manon Carpenter	1140
3.	(Australia) Tracey Hannah	1130
4.	(United Kingdom) Tahnée Seagrave	1015
5.	(Switzerland) Emilie Siegenthaler	630
6.	(France) Morgane Charre	590
7.	(France) Marine Cabirou	494
8.	(Italy) Eleonora Farina	442
9.	(Switzerland) Carina Cappellari	389
10.	(Canada) Miranda Miller	387

== See also ==
- 2016 UCI Mountain Bike & Trials World Championships
