= 2020 UCI Mountain Bike World Cup =

Series of races for all-terrain bicyclists

- Thirty-first edition of the UCI Mountain Bike World Cup

Details
- Dates: September–November 2020
- Races: 2 (XCO); 4 (DHI)

Champions
- Male individual champion: None
- Female individual champion: None

The 2020 Mercedes-Benz UCI Mountain Bike World Cup was a series of races in Olympic Cross-Country (XCO), Cross-Country Eliminator (XCE), and Downhill (DHI). Each discipline had an Elite Men and an Elite Women category. There were also under-23 categories in the XCO and junior categories in the DHI. The cross-country series had two rounds and the downhill series four rounds.

== Cross-country ==
UCI decided to not award World Cup standings points as just two races were run.

=== Elite ===
Date	Venue	Podium (Men)	Podium (Women)
1 October	(Czech Republic) Nové Město	Simon Andreassen (DEN)	Loana Lecomte (FRA)
1 October	(Czech Republic) Nové Město	Maxime Marotte (FRA)	Anne Terpstra (NED)
1 October	(Czech Republic) Nové Město	Milan Vader (NED)	Pauline Ferrand-Prévot (FRA)
4 October	(Czech Republic) Nové Město	Henrique Avancini (BRA)	Pauline Ferrand-Prévot (FRA)
4 October	(Czech Republic) Nové Město	Milan Vader (NED)	Anne Terpstra (NED)
4 October	(Czech Republic) Nové Město	Nino Schurter (SUI)	Loana Lecomte (FRA)

=== Under 23 ===
Date	Venue	Podium (Men)	Podium (Women)
1 October	(Czech Republic) Nové Město	Tom Pidcock (GBR)	Giorgia Marchet (ITA)
1 October	(Czech Republic) Nové Město	Alexandre Balmer (SUI)	Ceylin del Carmen Alvarado (NED)
1 October	(Czech Republic) Nové Město	Vital Albin (SUI)	Haley Batten (USA)
3 October	(Czech Republic) Nové Město	Tom Pidcock (GBR)	Ceylin del Carmen Alvarado (NED)
3 October	(Czech Republic) Nové Město	Christopher Blevins (USA)	Marika Tovo (ITA)
3 October	(Czech Republic) Nové Město	Vital Albin (SUI)	Hélène Clauzel (FRA)

== Downhill ==
=== Elite ===
Date	Venue	Podium (Men)	Podium (Women)
16 October	(Slovenia) Maribor	Loris Vergier (FRA)	Marine Cabirou (FRA)
16 October	(Slovenia) Maribor	Rémi Thirion (FRA)	Myriam Nicole (FRA)
16 October	(Slovenia) Maribor	Thibaut Dapréla (FRA)	Tracey Hannah (AUS)
18 October	(Slovenia) Maribor	Loris Vergier (FRA)	Nina Hoffmann (GER)
18 October	(Slovenia) Maribor	Loïc Bruni (FRA)	Marine Cabirou (FRA)
18 October	(Slovenia) Maribor	Matt Walker (GBR)	Eleonora Farina (ITA)
30 October	(Portugal) Lousã	Greg Minnaar (RSA)	Myriam Nicole (FRA)
30 October	(Portugal) Lousã	Matt Walker (GBR)	Marine Cabirou (FRA)
30 October	(Portugal) Lousã	Loïc Bruni (FRA)	Tahnée Seagrave (GBR)
1 November	(Portugal) Lousã	Loïc Bruni (FRA)	Marine Cabirou (FRA)
1 November	(Portugal) Lousã	Greg Minnaar (RSA)	Nina Hoffmann (GER)
1 November	(Portugal) Lousã	Matt Walker (GBR)	Tahnée Seagrave (GBR)

=== Junior ===
Date	Venue	Podium (Men)	Podium (Women)
16 October	(Slovenia) Maribor	Oisin O'Callaghan (IRL)	Léona Pierrini (FRA)
16 October	(Slovenia) Maribor	Dan Slack (GBR)	Siel van der Velden (BEL)
16 October	(Slovenia) Maribor	Nuno Reis (POR)	Anastasia Thiele (GER)
18 October	(Slovenia) Maribor	Oisin O'Callaghan (IRL)	Léona Pierrini (FRA)
18 October	(Slovenia) Maribor	Nuno Reis (POR)	Siel van der Velden (BEL)
18 October	(Slovenia) Maribor	Dante Silva (USA)	Ella Erickson (USA)
30 October	(Portugal) Lousã	Ethan Craik (GBR)	Léona Pierrini (FRA)
30 October	(Portugal) Lousã	Pau Menoyo (ESP)	Lauryne Chappaz (FRA)
30 October	(Portugal) Lousã	Christopher Grice (USA)	Aina González (ESP)
1 November	(Portugal) Lousã	Dante Silva (USA)	Lauryne Chappaz (FRA)
1 November	(Portugal) Lousã	Gonçalo Bandeira (POR)	Aina González (ESP)
1 November	(Portugal) Lousã	Ethan Craik (GBR)	Siel van der Velden (BEL)

== Cross-country eliminator ==
Date	Venue	Podium (Men)	Podium (Women)
20 September	(Belgium) Waregem	Jeroen van Eck (NED)	Gaia Tormena (ITA)
20 September	(Belgium) Waregem	Hugo Briatta (FRA)	Coline Clauzure (FRA)
20 September	(Belgium) Waregem	Simon Gegenheimer (GER)	Didi de Vries (NED)
14 November	(Spain) Barcelona	Jeroen van Eck (NED)	Gaia Tormena (ITA)
14 November	(Spain) Barcelona	Lorenzo Serres (FRA)	Marion Fromberger (GER)
14 November	(Spain) Barcelona	Simon Gegenheimer (GER)	Sara Gay (ESP)

== World Cup standings ==
bold denotes race winners.

=== Cross-country ===
==== Men's ====
**Top 5 Men's Elite Standings**
Rank	Rider	CZE (Czech Republic)	CZE (Czech Republic)	Total Points
1	(Brazil) **Henrique Avancini**	140	**260**	**400**
2	(Netherlands) Milan Vader	160	202	**362**
3	(Denmark) Simon Andreassen	**250**	80	**330**
4	(Switzerland) Nino Schurter	150	160	**310**
5	(France) Maxime Marotte	204	90	**294**

**Top 5 Men's Under 23 Standings**
Rank	Rider	CZE (Czech Republic)	CZE (Czech Republic)	Total Points
1	(United Kingdom) **Tom Pidcock**	**90**	**90**	**180**
2	(Switzerland) Vital Albin	60	60	**120**
3	(United States) Christopher Blevins	35	70	**105**
4	(Chile) Martín Vidaurre	50	35	**85**
5	(Switzerland) Alexandre Balmer	70	14	**84**

==== Women's ====
**Top 5 Women's Elite Standings**
Rank	Rider	CZE (Czech Republic)	CZE (Czech Republic)	Total Points
1	(France) **Pauline Ferrand-Prévot**	166	**256**	**422**
2	(France) Loana Lecomte	**251**	164	**415**
3	(Netherlands) Anne Terpstra	200	200	**400**
4	(Austria) Laura Stigger	140	144	**284**
5	(France) Lena Gerault	150	120	**270**

**Top 5 Women's Under 23 Standings**
Rank	Rider	CZE (Czech Republic)	CZE (Czech Republic)	Total Points
1	(Netherlands) **Ceylin del Carmen Alvarado**	70	**90**	**160**
2	(Italy) Giorgia Marchet	**90**	40	**130**
3	(United States) Haley Batten	60	50	**110**
4	(France) Hélène Clauzel	24	60	**84**
5	(Italy) Marika Tovo	10	70	**80**

=== Downhill ===
==== Men's ====
**Top 5 Men's Elite Standings**
Rank	Rider	SLO (Slovenia)	SLO (Slovenia)	POR (Portugal)	POR (Portugal)	Total Points
1	(United Kingdom) **Matt Walker**	155	162	200	170	**687**
2	(France) Loïc Bruni	55	210	162	**250**	**677**
3	(South Africa) Greg Minnaar	115	87	**225**	200	**627**
4	(France) Loris Vergier	**225**	**225**	53	48	**551**
5	(France) Thibaut Dapréla	180	115	113	108	**516**

**Top 5 Men's Junior Standings**
Rank	Rider	SLO (Slovenia)	SLO (Slovenia)	POR (Portugal)	POR (Portugal)	Total Points
1	(United Kingdom) **Ethan Craik**	25	16	60	30	**131**
2	(Republic of Ireland) Oisin O'Callaghan	60	60	0	0	**120**
3	(Portugal) Nuno Reis	30	40	20	20	**110**
4	(United States) Dante Silva	2	30	0	60	**92**
5	(United Kingdom) Dan Slack	40	14	25	0	**79**

==== Women's ====
**Top 5 Women's Elite Standings**
Rank	Rider	SLO (Slovenia)	SLO (Slovenia)	POR (Portugal)	POR (Portugal)	Total Points
1	(France) **Marine Cabirou**	**210**	180	185	**250**	**825**
2	(France) Myriam Nicole	200	175	**250**	150	**775**
3	(Germany) Nina Hoffmann	109	**225**	130	200	**664**
4	(Australia) Tracey Hannah	190	126	165	82	**563**
5	(United Kingdom) Tahnée Seagrave	96	110	170	170	**546**

**Top 5 Women's Junior Standings**
Rank	Rider	SLO (Slovenia)	SLO (Slovenia)	POR (Portugal)	POR (Portugal)	Total Points
1	(France) **Léona Pierrini**	60	60	60	10	**190**
2	(Belgium) Siel van der Velden	40	40	5	20	**105**
3	(France) Lauryne Chappaz	DNS	DNS	40	60	**100**
4	(Spain) Aina González	DNS	DNS	20	40	**60**
5	(United States) Ella Erickson	10	20	10	5	**45**

=== Cross-country eliminator ===
**Top 5 Men's Elite Standings**
Rank	Rider	CZE (Czech Republic)	ESP (Spain)	Total Points
1	(Netherlands) **Jeroen van Eck**	**90**	**80**	**170**
2	(France) Lorenzo Serres	45	70	**115**
3	(Germany) Simon Gegenheimer	43	43	**86**
4	(France) Hugo Briatta	55	DNS	**55**
5	(France) Simon Rogier	21	29	**50**

**Top 5 Women's Elite Standings**
Rank	Rider	CZE (Czech Republic)	ESP (Spain)	Total Points
1	(Italy) **Gaia Tormena**	**90**	**90**	180
2	(Germany) Marion Fromberger	60	29	89
2	(France) Coline Clauzure	60	DNS	60
3	(Netherlands) Didi de Vries	45	DNS	45
=	(Spain) Sara Gay	DNS	45	45
5	(Spain) Sara Méndez	DND	38	38

== See also ==
- 2020 UCI Mountain Bike World Championships
