= 2004 UCI Mountain Bike & Trials World Championships =

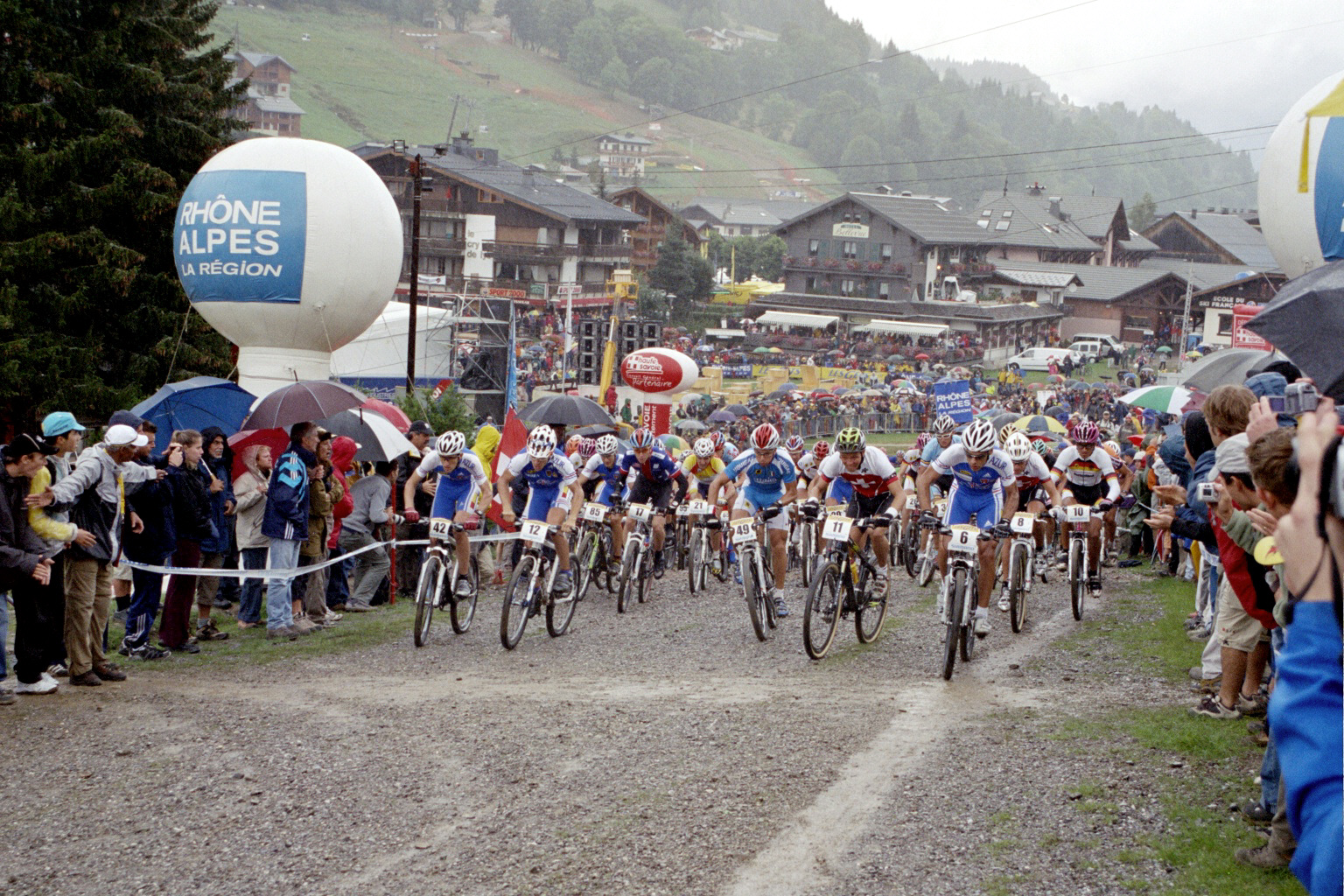
- Venue: Les Gets, France
- Date(s): 8–12 September 2004
- Events: MTB: 12; Trials: 6

The 2004 UCI Mountain Bike & Trials World Championships were held in Les Gets, a ski station in the French Alps, from 8 to 12 September 2004. The disciplines included were cross-country, downhill, four-cross, and trials. The event was the 15th edition of the UCI Mountain Bike World Championships and the 19th edition of the UCI Trials World Championships.

Julien Absalon won the elite men's cross-country, the first of his five elite world titles. The bronze medal in the event was won by Thomas Frischknecht, the last of his seven medals in the category, the first of which having been his silver medal in the inaugural UCI Mountain Bike World Championships in 1990.

Reigning UCI World Cup and Olympic champion Gunn-Rita Dahle won the elite women's cross-country, the second of her four elite world titles. She became the first and so far only woman to win the Olympic Games, UCI World Championship, and UCI World Cup in the same year. Alison Sydor won the bronze medal, the last of her ten medals in the event.

The junior men's cross country was won by future Olympic mountain bike champion and five-time elite world champion Nino Schurter, in front of Frenchmen Stéphane Tempier and Maxime Marotte.

The elite women's downhill was won by Vanessa Quin of New Zealand. Anne-Caroline Chausson, who had won the previous eight world titles, did not start the event due to an injury sustained in training. Fabien Barel of France won the elite men's downhill after Steve Peat, who had been first in qualifying, crashed near the finish while leading by more than a second.

Daniel Comas became the first Spanish UCI World Champion in the men's 26" trials, an event previously dominated by French riders. Fellow Spaniard Benito Ros Charral won the second of his ten world titles in the men's 20" trials. Swiss rider Karin Moor won the fourth of her nine world titles in the women's trials.

== Medal summary ==
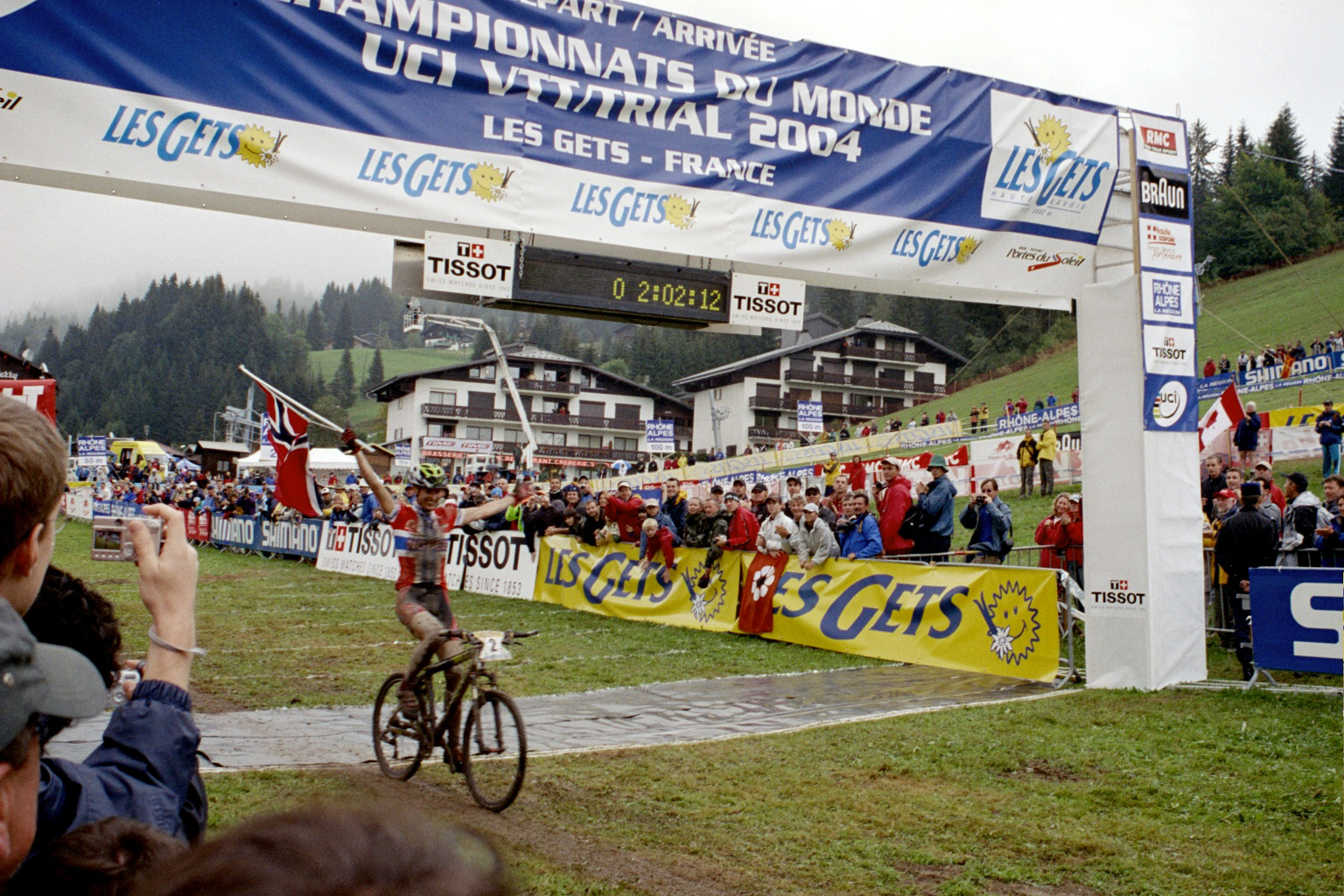
Gunn-Rita Dahle winning the women's cross-country

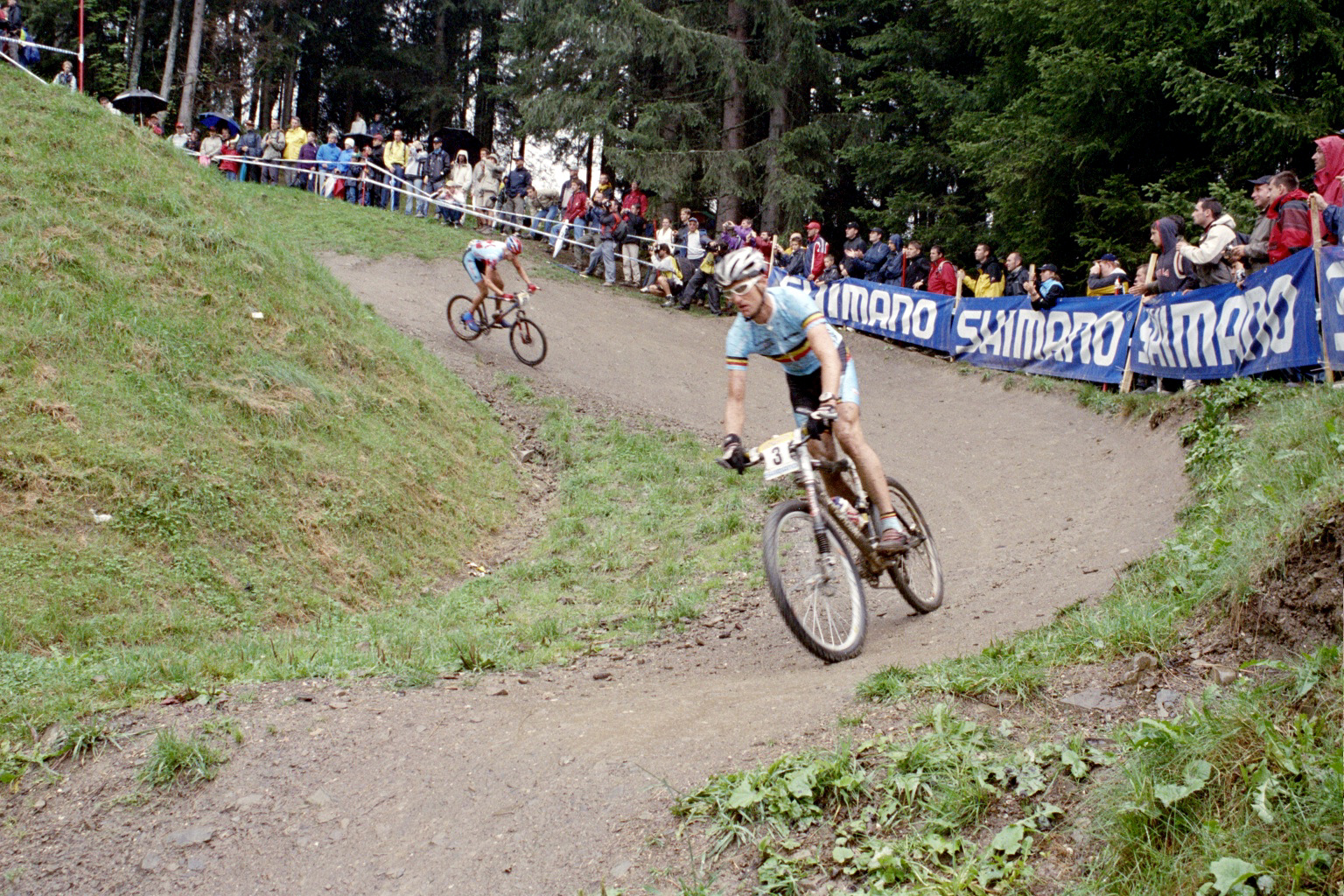
Roel Paulissen competing in the men's cross-country

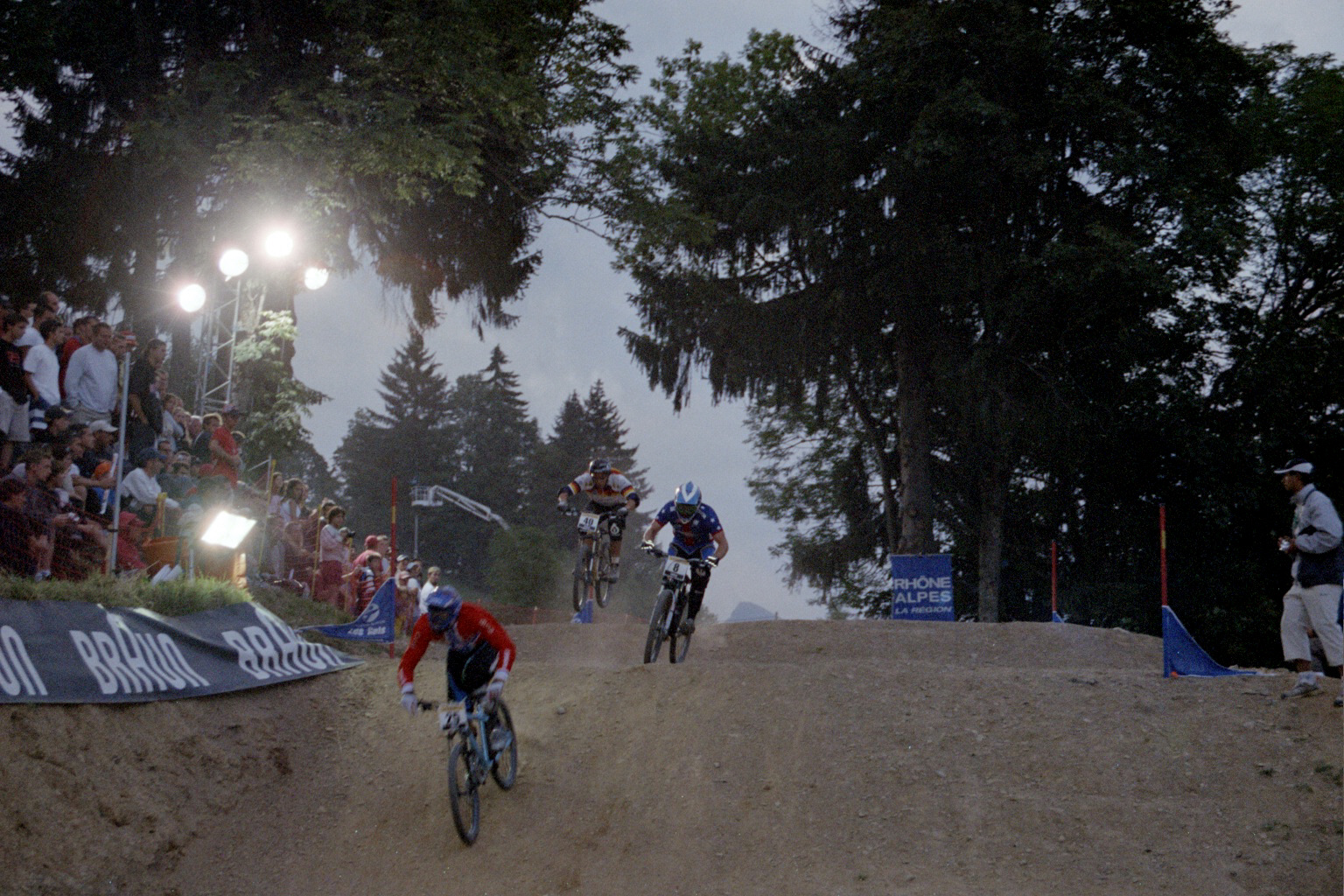
Quarter finals of the men's four-cross

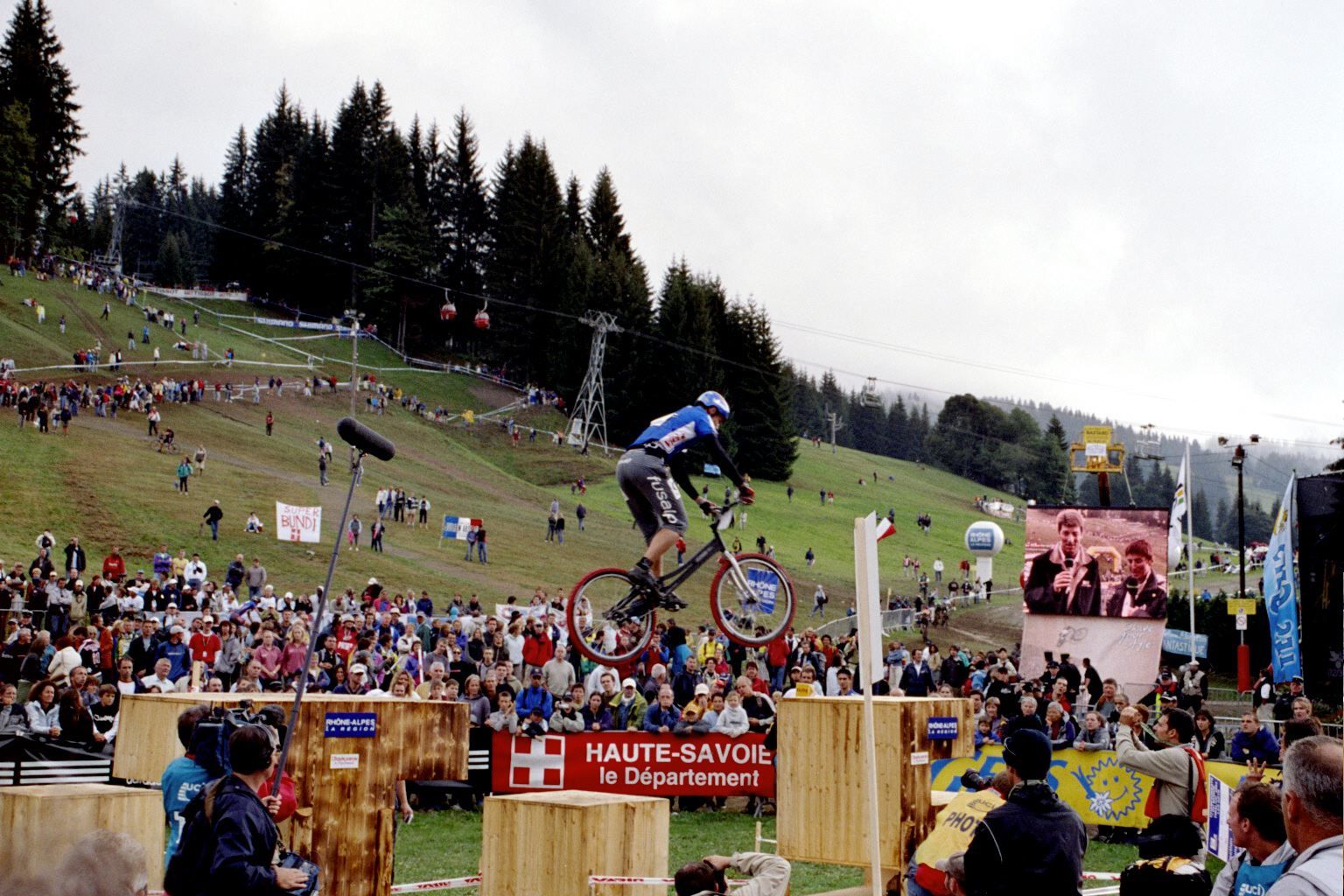
26" trials final with the cross-country course in the background

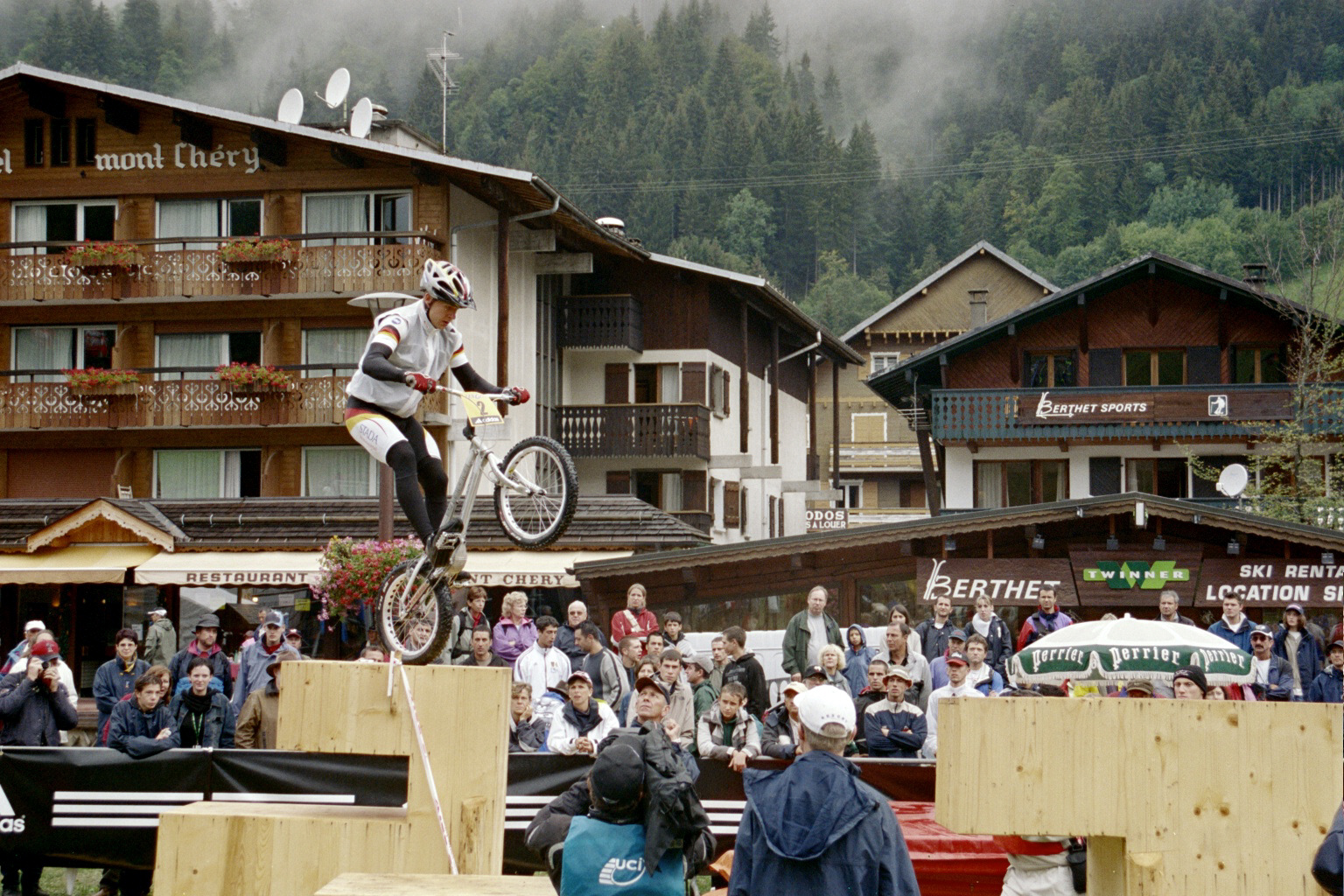
20" trials final – section in Les Gets town centre

=== Men's events ===
Event	Gold	Silver	Bronze
Cross-country	Julien Absalon (FRA)	Cedric Ravanel (FRA)	Thomas Frischknecht (SUI)
Under-23 cross-country	Manuel Fumic (GER)	Liam Killeen (GBR)	Florian Vogel (SUI)
Junior cross-country	Nino Schurter (SUI)	Stéphane Tempier (FRA)	Maxime Marotte (FRA)
Downhill	Fabien Barel (FRA)	Greg Minnaar (RSA)	Sam Hill (AUS)
Junior downhill	Romain Saladini (FRA)	Florent Payet (FRA)	Kyle Strait (USA)
Four-cross	Eric Carter (USA)	Mickael Deldycke (FRA)	Michal Prokop (CZE)
Trials, 20-inch	Benito Ros Charral (ESP)	Marco Hösel (GER)	Rafal Kumorowski (POL)
Trials, 26-inch	Daniel Comas (ESP)	Vincent Hermance (FRA)	Marc Caisso (FRA)
Junior trials, 20-inch	James Hyland (GBR)	Ben Savage (GBR)	Felix Heller (GER)
Junior trials, 26-inch	Ben Savage (GBR)	Florent Tournier (FRA)	Sébastian Hoffmann (GER)

=== Women's events ===
Event	Gold	Silver	Bronze
Cross-country	Gunn-Rita Dahle (NOR)	Maja Włoszczowska (POL)	Alison Sydor (CAN)
Junior cross-country	Nathalie Schneitter (SUI)	Laura Metzler (FRA)	Tereza Hurikova (CZE)
Downhill	Vanessa Quin (NZL)	Mio Suemasa (JPN)	Celine Gros (FRA)
Junior downhill	Scarlett Hagen (NZL)	Rachel Atherton (GBR)	Audrey Le Corguille (FRA)
Four-cross	Jana Horáková (CZE)	Jill Kintner (USA)	Tara Llanes (USA)
Trials	Karin Moor (SUI)	Ann-Christin Bettenhausen (GER)	Mireia Abant Condal (ESP)

=== Team events ===
Event	Gold	Silver	Bronze
Cross-country	Canada; Geoff Kabush; Maximiliam Plaxton; Kiara Bisaro; Raphaël Gagné	Switzerland; Ralph Näf; Florian Vogel; Nino Schurter; Barbara Blatter	Poland; Marcin Karczynski; Kryspin Pyrgies; Pawel Szpila; Maja Włoszczowska
Trials	Spain	Germany	Switzerland

=== Medal table ===
Rank	Nation	Gold	Silver	Bronze	Total
1	France (FRA)	3	7	4	14
2	Switzerland (SUI)	3	1	3	7
3	Spain (ESP)	3	0	1	4
4	Great Britain (GBR)	2	3	0	5
5	New Zealand (NZL)	2	0	0	2
6	Germany (GER)	1	3	2	6
7	United States (USA)	1	1	2	4
8	Czech Republic (CZE)	1	0	2	3
9	Canada (CAN)	1	0	1	2
10	Norway (NOR)	1	0	0	1
11	Poland (POL)	0	1	2	3
12	Japan (JPN)	0	1	0	1
12	South Africa (RSA)	0	1	0	1
14	Australia (AUS)	0	0	1	1
Totals (14 entries)		18	18	18	54

== See also ==
- UCI Mountain Bike Marathon World Championships
