= Loana Lecomte =

French cyclist (born 1999)

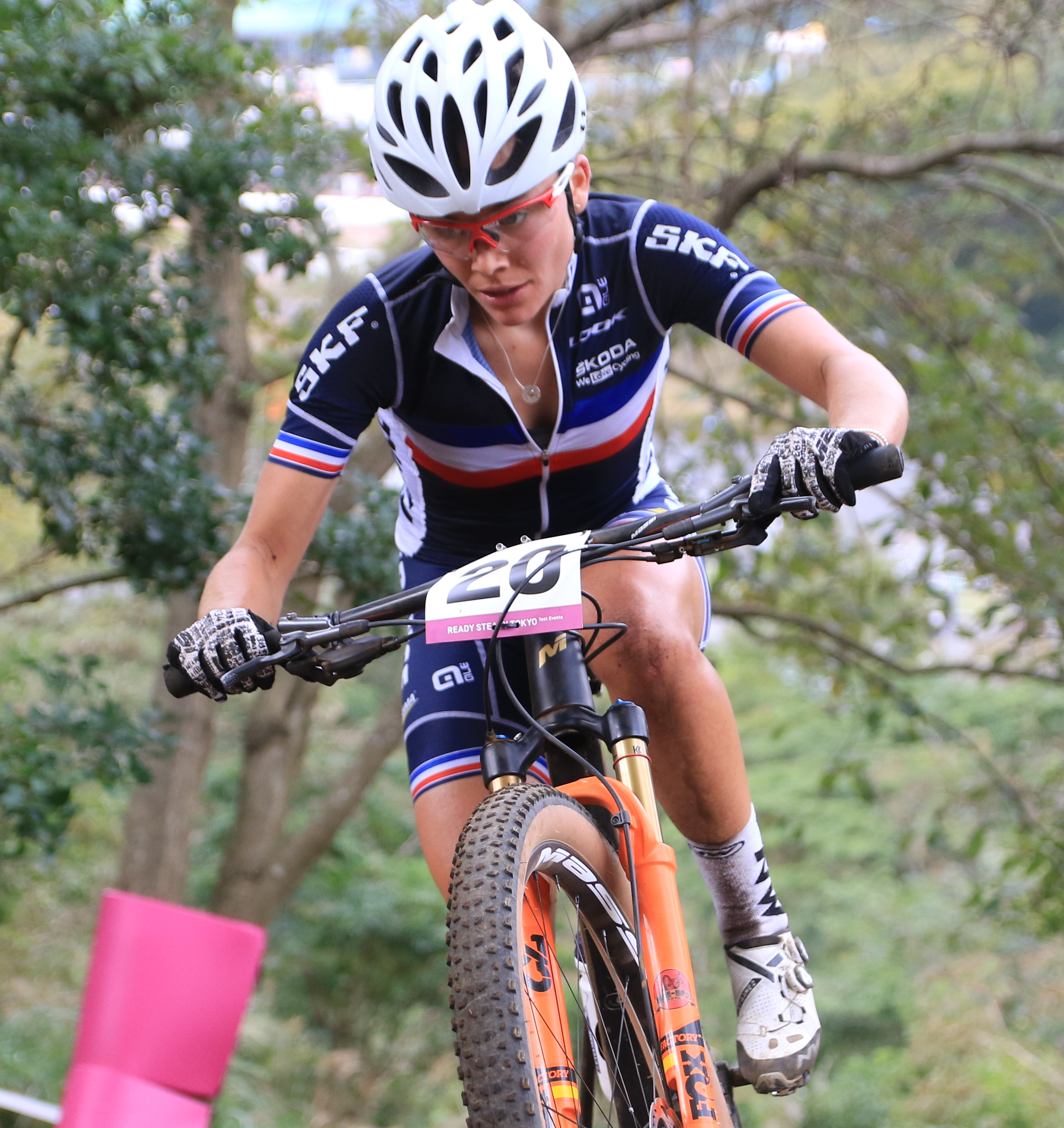
- Lecomte in 2019

Personal information
- Born: 8 August 1999 (age 27) Annecy, France

Cycling career
- Sport: Cycling
- Current team: BMC Factory Racing
- Discipline: Mountain bike
- Role: Rider
- Rider type: Cross-country

Amateur team
- 2014–2017: Annecy Cyclisme Compétition

Professional teams
- 2017–2019: Look Beaumes de Venise
- 2019–2021: Massi Bikes
- 2022–2024: Canyon CLLCTV XCO Team
- 2025–: BMC Factory Racing

Major wins
- Mountain bike European XC Championships (2022) National XC Championships (2021–2024) XC World Cup (2021) 11 individual wins (2020–2024)
Medal record
Women's mountain bike racing
Representing France
World Championships
Gold medal – first place	2020 Leogang	Under-23 Cross-country
Gold medal – first place	2020 Leogang	Team relay
Silver medal – second place	2024 Vallnord	Team relay
European Championships
Gold medal – first place	2022 Munich	Cross-country

Loana Lecomte (born 8 August 1999) is a French cross-country and mountain bike cyclist.

== Career ==
In her first season as a junior in 2016, Lecomte became French champion and won several races of the Coupe de France de VTT. In her second season as a junior, she won silver in cross country at the UCI Mountain Bike World Championships and the UEC Mountain Bike European Championships. After moving to the U23, she was once again on the podium at the World and European Championships in 2019. In 2020, Lecomte raced, and won, her first World Cup race as an elite and then went on to claim world and European championship titles with victory in the UCI Mountain Bike & Trials World Championships – Team relay at the 2020 UCI Mountain Bike World Championships in Leogang and the U-23 race at the European Mountain Bike Championships in Monteceneri.

She followed this up when on 16 May 2021 Lecomte won her second consecutive UCI Mountain Bike World Cup race after victories in Albstadt and Nové Město.

In 2022 Lecomte won gold at the 2022 European Mountain Bike Championships. In 2023, she finished runner-up to compatriot Pauline Ferrand-Prévot at the 2023 UCI Mountain Bike World Championships in the XCO. At the championships she was also part of the French team that won silver in the relay event, alongside Jordan Sarrou, Line Burquier, Anais Moulin, Adrian Boichis and Julien Hémon.

Lecomte competed in the 2024 Olympic Games in Paris, where she suffered an injury during the Mountain Bike Cross Country final and was unable to finish the race.

After three years with Canyon CLLCTV, Lecomte joined BMC Factory Racing for the 2025 season. In September 2025, she won a gold medal with the French team at the 2025 UCI Mountain Bike World Championships, alongside Lise Revol, Joshua Dubau, Olivia Onesti, Adrien Boichis, and Lucas Teste, in Crans-Montana, Switzerland.

== Major results ==
2016
1st Cross-country, National Junior Championships
2017
1st Cross-country, National Junior Championships
2nd Cross-country, UCI World Junior Championships
2nd Cross-country, UEC European Junior Championships
2019
1st Cross-country, National Under-23 Championships
UCI World Championships

3rd Team relay
3rd Under-23 Cross-country

3rd Cross-country, UEC European Under-23 Championships
2020
UCI World Championships

1st Team relay
1st Under-23 Cross-country

UEC European Championships

1st Under-23 Cross-country
2nd Team relay

1st Cross-country, National Under-23 Championships
UCI XCO World Cup

1st Nové Město I
3rd Nové Město II

2nd Cross-country, National Championships
Swiss Bike Cup

3rd Leukerbad

French Cup

3rd Alpe d'Huez

2021
1st Cross-country, National Championships
1st Overall UCI XCO World Cup

1st Albstadt
1st Nové Město
1st Leogang
1st Les Gets

French Cup

1st Lons-le-Saunier

Internazionali d’Italia Series

1st Nalles

2022
1st Cross-country, UEC European Championships
1st Cross-country, National Championships
UCI XCO World Cup

1st Leogang
1st Lenzerheide
2nd Val di Sole
3rd Petropolis

UCI XCC World Cup

1st Leogang
2nd Val di Sole

French Cup

1st Le Bessat
1st Le Dévoluy

2023
1st Cross-country, National Championships
2nd Overall UCI XCO World Cup

1st Lenzerheide
1st Mont-Sainte-Anne
2nd Snowshoe
3rd Nové Město
4th Vallnord

XCO French Cup

1st Marseille–Luminy
1st Lons-le-Saunier

UCI World Championships

2nd Cross-country
2nd Team relay

UCI XCC World Cup

2nd Mont-Sainte-Anne

5th Cross-country, UEC European Championships
2024
National Championships

1st Cross-country
1st Short track

XCO French Cup

1st Ussel

XCC French Cup

1st Marseille

UCI XCO World Cup

1st Crans-Montana
1st Mont-Sainte-Anne
4th Val di Sole
4th Lake Placid

UCI XCC World Cup

2nd Mont-Sainte-Anne
4th Crans-Montana
4th Lake Placid

5th Cross-country, UCI World Championships
