= Roc d'Azur =

Annual French mountain bike competition

- Location: Fréjus and Roquebrune-sur-Argens, France
- Dates: Yearly in October
- Website: www.rocazur.com

Roc d'Azur is an annual mountain biking event held in Fréjus and Roquebrune-sur-Argens, France during October. It consists of a trade show and a few dozen races, attracting riders from various countries. The inaugural edition of the Roc d'Azur was run in 1984 and featured seven competitors, including event founder Stéphane Hauvette. The Roc d'Azur has since grown to become the biggest mountain biking event in the world.

== List of winners ==
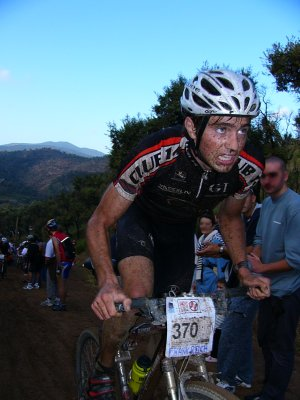
Pierre-Geoffroy Plantet (third in the U23 race) climbs the Col du Bougnon in the 2004 Roc d'Azur

List of winners
Year	Men	Women
2024	France: Jordan Sarrou	Belgium: Emeline Dutilleux
2023	France: Hugo Drechou	France: Noémie Garnier
2022	France: Jordan Sarrou	France: Pauline Ferrand-Prévot
2021	Switzerland: Filipo Colombo	Lithuania: Katazina Sosna
2020	Cancelled due to COVID-19 pandemic	
2019	France: Jordan Sarrou	France: Margot Moschetti
2018	France: Stéphane Tempier	France: Sabrina Enaux
2017	Switzerland: Nicola Rohrbach	France: Pauline Ferrand-Prévot
2016	France: Jordan Sarrou	Denmark: Annika Langvad
2015	France: Victor Koretzky	France: Julie Bresset
2014	France: Jordan Sarrou	France: Margot Moschetti
2013	France: Miguel Martinez	Austria: Elisabeth Osl
2012	France: Stéphane Tempier	Poland: Anna Szafraniec
2011	Germany: Moritz Milatz	Poland: Maja Włoszczowska
2010	Austria: Alban Lakata	Poland: Maja Włoszczowska
2009	Belgium: Roel Paulissen	Switzerland: Marielle Saner-Guinchard
2008	Belgium: Roel Paulissen	Austria: Elisabeth Osl
2007	France: Jean-Christophe Péraud	Switzerland: Petra Henzi
2006	Switzerland: Christoph Sauser	Canada: Alison Sydor
2005	Switzerland: Christoph Sauser	France: Maryline Salvetat
2004	France: Miguel Martinez	Canada: Alison Sydor
2003	France: Jean-Christophe Péraud	Canada: Alison Sydor
2002	France: Peter Pouly	France: Laurence Leboucher
2001	France: Thomas Dietsch	France: Laurence Leboucher
2000	France: Thomas Dietsch	Switzerland: Chantal Daucourt
1999	France: Christophe Dupouey	France: Laurence Leboucher
1998	France: Christophe Dupouey	France: Laurence Leboucher
1997	France: Miguel Martinez	Norway: Gunn-Rita Dahle
1996	France: Christophe Manin	Norway: Gunn-Rita Dahle
1995	Netherlands: Bart Brentjens	France: Sophie Eglin
1994	France: Jean-Christophe Savignoni	France: Sophie Eglin
1993	France: Bruno Lebras	Switzerland: Sylvia Furst
1992	United Kingdom: Tim Gould	Slovakia: Eva Orvosova
1991	United Kingdom: Tim Gould	Slovakia: Eva Orvosova
1990	France: Bruno Lebras	Switzerland: Sylvia Furst
1989	France: Olaf Candau	France: Nathalie Ségura
1988	France: Patrice Thévenard	
1987	France: Eric Chanton	
1986	France: Jean-Pierre Morel	
1985	Switzerland: Alain Dallenbach	
1984	France: Larbi Midoune	
