= UCI Mountain Bike & Trials World Championships – Women's downhill =

The women's downhill is an event at the annual UCI Mountain Bike & Trials World Championships. It has been held since the inaugural championships in 1990.

== Medalists ==
Championships	Gold	Silver	Bronze
1990 (United States) Durango	Cindy Devine; Canada	Elladee Brown; Canada	Penny Davidson; United States
1991 (Italy) Ciocco	Giovanna Bonazzi; Italy	Nathalie Fiat; France	Cindy Devine; Canada
1992 (Canada) Bromont	Juli Furtado; United States	Kim Sonier; United States	Cindy Devine; Canada
1993 (France) Métabief	Giovanna Bonazzi; Italy	Kim Sonier; United States	Missy Giove; United States
1994 (United States) Vail	Missy Giove; United States	Sophie Kempf; France	Giovanna Bonazzi; Italy
1995 (Germany) Kirchzarten	Leigh Donovan; United States	Mercedes Gonzalez; Spain	Giovanna Bonazzi; Italy
1996 (Australia) Cairns	Anne-Caroline Chausson; France	Leigh Donovan; United States	Missy Giove; United States
1997 (Switzerland) Château-d'Œx	Anne-Caroline Chausson; France	Marielle Saner; Switzerland	Katja Repo; Finland
1998 (Canada) Mont-Sainte-Anne	Anne-Caroline Chausson; France	Nolvenn Le Caer; France	Cheri Elliott; United States
1999 (Sweden) Åre	Anne-Caroline Chausson; France	Katja Repo; Finland	Sari Jorgensen; Switzerland
2000 (Spain) Sierra Nevada	Anne-Caroline Chausson; France	Katja Repo; Finland	Marla Streb; United States
2001 (United States) Vail	Anne-Caroline Chausson; France	Fionn Griffiths; Great Britain	Leigh Donovan; United States
2002 (Austria) Kaprun	Anne-Caroline Chausson; France	Fionn Griffiths; Great Britain	Missy Giove; United States
2003 (Switzerland) Lugano	Anne-Caroline Chausson; France	Sabrina Jonnier; France	Nolvenn Le Caer; France
2004 (France) Les Gets	Vanessa Quin; New Zealand	Mio Suemasa; Japan	Celine Gros; France
2005 (Italy) Livigno	Anne-Caroline Chausson; France	Sabrina Jonnier; France	Emmeline Ragot; France
2006 (New Zealand) Rotorua	Sabrina Jonnier; France	Tracy Moseley; Great Britain	Rachel Atherton; Great Britain
2007 (United Kingdom) Fort William	Sabrina Jonnier; France	Rachel Atherton; Great Britain	Tracey Hannah; Australia
2008 (Italy) Val di Sole	Rachel Atherton; Great Britain	Sabrina Jonnier; France	Emmeline Ragot; France
2009 (Australia) Canberra	Emmeline Ragot; France	Tracy Moseley; Great Britain	Kathleen Pruitt; United States
2010 (Canada) Mont-Sainte-Anne	Tracy Moseley; Great Britain	Sabrina Jonnier; France	Emmeline Ragot; France
2011 (Switzerland) Champéry	Emmeline Ragot; France	Rachel Atherton; Great Britain	Claire Buchar; Canada
2012 (Austria) Leogang/Saalfelden	Morgane Charre; France	Emmeline Ragot; France	Manon Carpenter; Great Britain
2013 (South Africa) Pietermaritzburg	Rachel Atherton; Great Britain	Emmeline Ragot; France	Tracey Hannah; Australia
2014 (Norway) Hafjell/Lillehammer	Manon Carpenter; Great Britain	Rachel Atherton; Great Britain	Tahnée Seagrave; Great Britain
2015 (Andorra) Vallnord	Rachel Atherton; Great Britain	Manon Carpenter; Great Britain	Tracey Hannah; Australia
2016 (Italy) Val di Sole	Rachel Atherton; Great Britain	Myriam Nicole; France	Tracey Hannah; Australia
2017 (Australia) Cairns	Miranda Miller; Canada	Myriam Nicole; France	Tracey Hannah; Australia
2018 (Switzerland) Lenzerheide	Rachel Atherton; Great Britain	Tahnée Seagrave; Great Britain	Myriam Nicole; France
2019 (Canada) Mont-Sainte-Anne	Myriam Nicole; France	Tahnée Seagrave; Great Britain	Marine Cabirou; France
2020 (Austria) Leogang	Camille Balanche; Switzerland	Myriam Nicole; France	Monika Hrastnik; Slovenia
2021 (Italy) Val di Sole	Myriam Nicole; France	Marine Cabirou; France	Camille Balanche; Switzerland
2022 (France) Les Gets	Valentina Höll; Austria	Nina Hoffmann; Germany	Myriam Nicole; France
2023 (United Kingdom) Glasgow	Valentina Höll; Austria	Camille Balanche; Switzerland	Marine Cabirou; France
2024 (Andorra) Pal–Arinsal	Valentina Höll; Austria	Myriam Nicole; France	Tahnée Seagrave; Great Britain
2025 (Switzerland) Valais	Valentina Höll; Austria	Myriam Nicole; France	Marine Cabirou; France

== Medal table ==
Rank	Nation	Gold	Silver	Bronze	Total
1	France	16	15	10	41
2	Great Britain	7	10	4	21
3	Austria	4	0	0	4
4	United States	3	3	8	14
5	Canada	2	1	3	6
6	Italy	2	0	2	4
7	Switzerland	1	2	2	5
8	New Zealand	1	0	0	1
9	Finland	0	2	1	3
10	Germany	0	1	0	1
10	Japan	0	1	0	1
10	Spain	0	1	0	1
13	Australia	0	0	5	5
14	Slovenia	0	0	1	1
Totals (14 entries)		36	36	36	108

=== Medal table by rider ===
Rank	Coureur	Gold	Silver	Bronze	Total
1	(France) Anne-Caroline Chausson	9	0	0	9
2	(United Kingdom) Rachel Atherton	5	3	1	9
3	(Austria) Valentina Höll	4	0	0	4
4	(France) Myriam Nicole	2	5	2	9
5	(France) Sabrina Jonnier	2	4	0	6
6	(France) Emmeline Ragot	2	2	3	7
7	(Italy) Giovanna Bonazzi	2	0	2	4
8	(United Kingdom) Tracy Moseley	1	2	0	3
9	(Switzerland) Camille Balanche	1	1	1	3
9	(United States) Leigh Donovan	1	1	1	3
9	(United Kingdom) Manon Carpenter	1	1	1	3
13	(United States) Missy Giove	1	0	3	4
14	(Canada) Cindy Devine	1	0	2	3
15	(United States) Juli Furtado	1	0	0	1
15	(New Zealand) Vanessa Quin	1	0	0	1
15	(France) Morgane Charre	1	0	0	1
15	(Canada) Miranda Miller	1	0	0	1
Total		35	18	17	70
