= 2016 UCI Mountain Bike & Trials World Championships =

Cycling championship held in the Czech Republic and Italy

- Venue: Nové Město na Moravě, Czech Republic; Val di Sole, Italy
- Dates: 28 June – 3 July 2016 (Nové Město); 28 August – 11 September 2016 (Val di Sole)
- Events: MTB: 15; Trials: 6

The 2016 UCI Mountain Bike & Trials World Championships was the 27th edition of the UCI Mountain Bike & Trials World Championships. Unlike in previous years, the world championships for the various disciplines were held at two different locations. The world championships in cross-country were held in Nové Město na Moravě, Czech Republic from 28 June to 3 July 2016. The downhill, four-cross, and trials events were held at Val di Sole, Italy from 29 August to 11 September 2016.

== Medal summary ==
=== Men's events ===
Event	Gold	Silver	Bronze
Cross-country	Nino Schurter; Switzerland	Jaroslav Kulhavý; Czech Republic	Julien Absalon; France
Under 23 Cross-country	Sam Gaze; New Zealand	Victor Koretzky; France	Marcel Guerrini; Switzerland
Junior Cross-country	Thomas Bonnet; France	Vital Albin; Switzerland	Tobias Halland Johannessen; Norway
Cross-country eliminator	Daniel Federspiel; Austria	Simon Gegenheimer; Germany	Fabrice Mels; Belgium
Downhill	Danny Hart; Great Britain	Laurie Greenland; Great Britain	Florent Payet; France
Junior downhill	Finnley Iles; Canada	Magnus Manson; Canada	Gaetan Vige; France
Four-cross	Mitja Ergaver; Slovenia	Hannes Slavik; Austria	Luke Cryer; Great Britain
Trials, 20 inch	Abel Mustieles; Spain	Benito Ros; Spain	Ion Areitio; Spain
Trials, 26 inch	Jack Carthy; Great Britain	Gilles Coustellier; France	Kenny Belaey; Belgium
Junior trials, 20 inch	Eloi Palau; Spain	Nicolas Vallée; France	Samuel Hlavatý; Slovakia
Junior trials, 26 inch	Nicolas Vallée; France	Jordi Araque; Spain	Noah Cardona; France

=== Women's events ===
Event	Gold	Silver	Bronze
Cross-country	Annika Langvad; Denmark	Lea Davison; United States	Emily Batty; Canada
Under 23 Cross-country	Jenny Rissveds; Sweden	Sina Frei; Switzerland	Alessandra Keller; Switzerland
Junior Cross-country	Ida Jansson; Sweden	Lisa Pasteiner; Austria	Martina Berta; Italy
Cross-country eliminator	Linda Indergand; Switzerland	Kathrin Stirnemann; Switzerland	Ramona Forchini; Switzerland
Downhill	Rachel Atherton; Great Britain	Myriam Nicole; France	Tracey Hannah; Australia
Junior downhill	Alessia Missiaggia; Italy	Samantha Kingshill; United States	Flora Lesoin; France
Four-cross	Caroline Buchanan; Australia	Franziska Meyer; Germany	Anneke Beerten; Netherlands
Trials	Nina Reichenbach; Germany	Janine Jungfels; Australia	Perrine Devahive; Belgium

=== Team events ===
Event	Gold	Silver	Bronze
Cross-country	France; Victor Koretzky; Benjamin Le Ny; Pauline Ferrand-Prévot; Jordan Sarrou	Czech Republic; Matej Prudek; Richard Holec; Kateřina Nash; Jaroslav Kulhavý	Switzerland; Filippo Colombo; Vital Albin; Sina Frei; Lars Forster
Trials	France; Vincent Hermance; Alex Rudeau; Manon Basseville; Louis Grillon; Nicolas Vallée	Spain; Irene Caminos; Jordi Araque; Eloi Palau; Rafael Tibau; Abel Mustieles	Germany; Raphael Pils; Jonas Friedrich; Jannis Oing; Nina Reichenbach; Dominik Oswald

== Medal table ==
Rank	Nation	Gold	Silver	Bronze	Total
1	France	4	4	5	13
2	Great Britain	3	1	1	5
3	Switzerland	2	3	4	9
4	Spain	2	3	1	6
5	Sweden	2	-	-	2
6	Germany	1	2	1	4
7	Austria	1	2	-	3
8	Australia	1	1	1	3
8	Canada	1	1	1	3
10	Italy	1	-	1	2
11	Denmark	1	-	-	1
11	New Zealand	1	-	-	1
11	Slovenia	1	-	-	1
14	Czech Republic	-	2	-	2
14	United States	-	2	-	2
16	Belgium	-	-	3	3
17	Netherlands	-	-	1	1
17	Norway	-	-	1	1
17	Slovakia	-	-	1	1
Total		21	21	21	63

== See also ==
- 2016 UCI Mountain Bike World Cup
