= Titouan Carod =

French cyclist

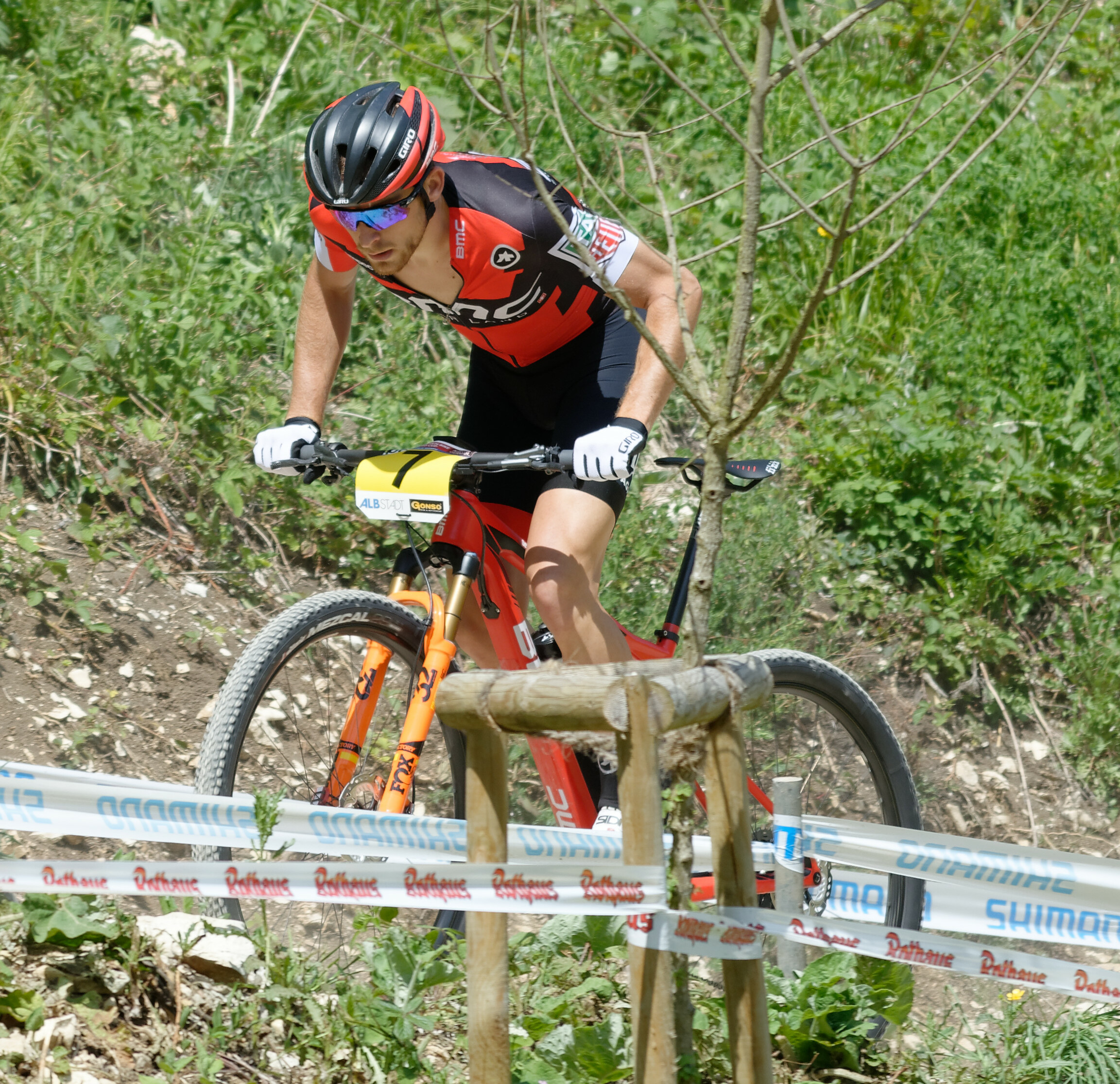
- Carod in 2017

Personal information
- Born: 1 April 1994 (age 32) Die, France
- Height: 1.78 m (5 ft 10 in)
- Weight: 65 kg (143 lb)

Cycling career
- Sport: Cycling
- Current team: Team BMC
- Discipline: Mountain bike
- Role: Rider
- Rider type: Cross-country

Professional teams
- 2012–2016: Scott Les Saisies
- 2017–: BMC Mountainbike Racing Team

Major wins
- Mountain bike National XC Championships (2018, 2022, 2023) XC World Cup 2 individual wins (2022)
Medal record
Representing France
Mountain bike racing
World Championships
Bronze medal – third place	2020 Leogang	Cross-country
Bronze medal – third place	2012 Saalfelden	Junior cross-country
European Championships
Silver medal – second place	2016 Huskvarna	Under-23 cross-country
Silver medal – second place	2012 Moscow	Junior cross-country
Silver medal – second place	2020 Monteceneri	Cross-country
Silver medal – second place	2024 Cheile Grădiștei	Mixed relay

Titouan Carod (born 1 April 1994 in Die) is a French cyclist, who specializes in cross-country mountain biking.

== Major results ==
2012
1st Cross-country, National Junior Championships
2nd Cross-country, UEC European Junior Championships
3rd Cross-country, UCI World Junior Championships
2014
3rd Cross-country, National Under-23 Championships
2015
1st Cross-country, National Under-23 Championships
1st Overall UCI Under-23 World Cup

1st Mont-Sainte-Anne
2nd Lenzerheide
2nd Windham
2nd Val di Sole

2016
1st Overall UCI Under-23 World Cup

1st La Bresse
1st Lenzerheide
1st Mont-Sainte-Anne
2nd Albstadt
3rd Cairns
3rd Vallnord

2nd Cross-country, UEC European Under-23 Championships
2nd Cross-country, National Under-23 Championships
2017
Swiss Bike Cup

1st Lugano
3rd Rivera

2nd Cross-country, National Championships
2018
1st Cross-country, National Championships
French Cup

1st Ussel
2nd Marseille

Swiss Bike Cup

1st Monte Tamaro
3rd Lugano

UCI XCO World Cup

3rd Mont-Sainte-Anne

2019
French Cup

1st Levens

UCI XCC World Cup

2nd Snowshoe

Swiss Bike Cup

2nd Monte Tamaro

3rd Cross-country, National Championships
2020
2nd Cross-country, UEC European Championships
2nd Cross-country, National Championships
3rd Cross-country, UCI World Championships
2021
French Cup

1st Ussel
2nd Marseille

Swiss Bike Cup

2nd Leukerbad

Copa Catalana Internacional

2nd Girona

3rd Cross-country, National Championships
2022
1st Cross-country, National Championships
2nd Overall UCI XCO World Cup

1st Mont-Sainte-Anne
1st Val di Sole
2nd Snowshoe

3rd Overall UCI XCC World Cup

1st Val di Sole

French Cup

1st Marseille
1st Le Bessat

Copa Catalana Internacional

1st Banyoles

Ökk Bike Revolution

2nd Chur

2023
1st Cross-country, National Championships
Shimano Super Cup

3rd Banyoles

UCI XCO World Cup

4th Mont-Sainte-Anne

2024
XCO French Cup

1st Ussel

XCC French Cup

1st Ussel

2nd Cross-country, National Championships
Shimano Super Cup

3rd Banyoles
