= Maxime Marotte =

French cyclist

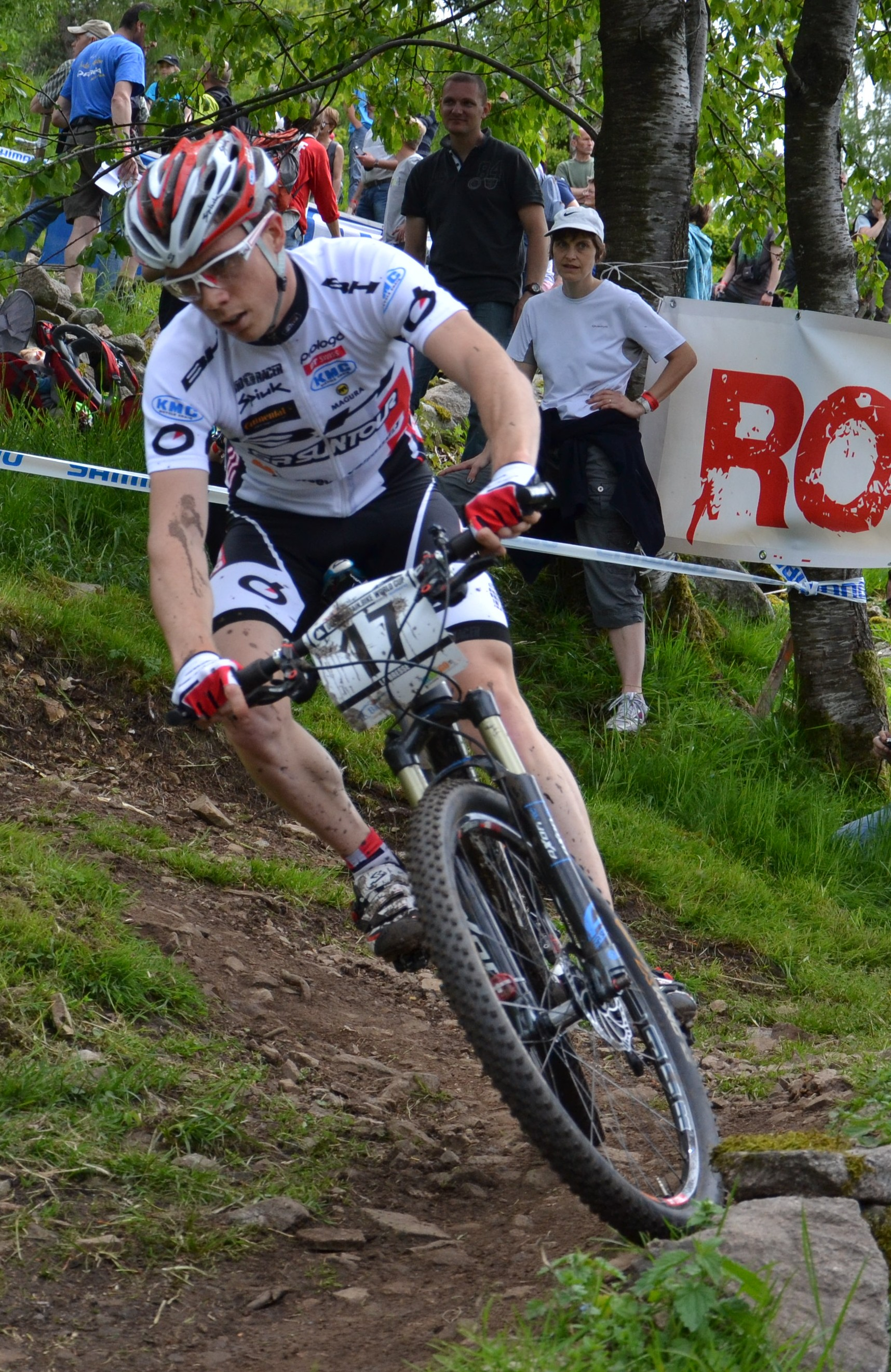

Personal information
- Born: 5 December 1986 (age 39) Mulhouse, France
- Height: 1.72 m (5 ft 8 in)
- Weight: 62 kg (137 lb)

Cycling career
- Sport: Cycling
- Current team: Team SantaCruz
- Discipline: Mountain bike
- Role: Rider

Professional teams
- 2011–2016: Team BH–Suntour
- 2017–2020: Team Cannondale
- 2021–: Team SantaCruz

Maxime Marotte (born 5 December 1986, in Mulhouse) is a French mountain bike racer. He rode at the cross-country event at the 2016 Summer Olympics.

== Major results ==
2004
3rd Cross-country, UCI World Junior Championships
2011
1st Team relay, UCI World Championships
1st Team relay, UEC European Championships
2nd Cross-country, National Championships
UCI XCO World Cup

3rd Offenburg

5th Overall UCI XCO World Cup
2012
2nd Team relay, UCI World Championships
3rd Cross-country, National Championships
2013
2nd Team relay, UCI World Championships
3rd Cross-country, National Championships
9th Overall UCI XCO World Cup
2014
1st Team relay, UCI World Championships
1st Team relay, UEC European Championships
2nd Marathon, National Championships
UCI XCO World Cup

3rd Cairns
3rd Pietermaritzburg

2015
National Championships

1st Marathon
2nd Cross-country

2016
2nd Cross-country, National Championships
3rd Overall UCI XCO World Cup

2nd Cairns
2nd La Bresse
3rd Albstadt
3rd Lenzerheide

4th Cross-country, Summer Olympics
2017
1st Cross-country, National Championships
3rd Overall UCI XCO World Cup
2018
3rd Overall UCI XCO World Cup

3rd Nové Město
3rd Stellenbosch
3rd La Bresse

3rd Cross-country, National Championships
2020
UCI XCO World Cup

2nd Nové Město I

2021
National Championships

1st Cross-country
2nd Short track

2022
UCI XCO World Cup

2nd Petrópolis

UCI XCC World Cup

3rd Petrópolis

Internazionali d’Italia Series

3rd San Zeno di Montagna

2023
3rd Cross-country, National Championships
