= Jean-Christophe Savignoni =

Personal information
- Born: 6 August 1966 (age 60) Fort-de-France, Martinique, France

Cycling career
- Sport: Cycling
- Current team: Retired
- Discipline: Mountain bike
- Role: Rider
- Rider type: Cross-country
Medal record
Representing France
Men's Mountain bike marathon
European Championships
Gold medal – first place	1995 Špindlerův Mlýn	Cross-country

Jean-Christophe Savignoni (born 6 August 1966) is a French former professional cross-country mountain biker. He most notably won European Cross-country Championships and the French national cross-country championships in 1995. He was also a high level triathlete and runner, having competed at the Boston and Berlin Marathon.

== Major results ==
1992
2nd Roc d'Azur
1993
2nd Roc d'Azur
1994
1st Roc d'Azur
1995
1st European XCO Championships
1st National XCO Championships
