= Thomas Dietsch =

French bicycle racer (born 1974)

Personal information
- Born: 8 August 1974 (age 52) Croix, Nord, France

Cycling career
- Sport: Cycling
- Current team: Retired
- Discipline: Cross-country
- Role: Rider

Professional teams
- 1997: Team Lapierre
- 2003: Motorex–Bianchi
- 2004: Bianchi–Agos
- 2008: Gewiss Bianchi
Medal record
Representing France
Men's Mountain bike marathon
World Championships
Silver medal – second place	2004 Bad Goisern	Men's race
Bronze medal – third place	2007 Verviers	Men's race

Thomas Dietsch (born 8 August 1974) is a French former professional cross-country mountain biker. He retired after the 2014 season.

== Major results ==
2000
1st National Cross-country Championships
1st Roc d'Azur
2001
1st Roc d'Azur
2002
2nd European XCM Championships
2003
1st European XCM Championships
2004
1st European XCM Championships
2nd UCI World XCM Championships
2006
1st National XCM Championships
2007
1st Overall UCI XCM World Cup
3rd UCI World XCM Championships
2008
1st National XCM Championships
2009
1st National XCM Championships
2011
1st National XCM Championships
2012
1st National XCM Championships
2013
1st National XCM Championships
2014
1st National XCM Championships
