= Hugo Briatta =

French cyclist (born 1996)

Personal information
- Born: 24 June 1996 (age 30)

Cycling career
- Sport: Cycling
- Discipline: Mountain biking
- Role: Rider
- Rider type: Cross-country, cross-country eliminator
Medal record
Representing France
Men's mountain bike racing
World Championships
Silver medal – second place	2018 Chengdu	Cross-country eliminator
Silver medal – second place	2019 Waregem	Cross-country eliminator
European Championships
Gold medal – first place	2019 Brno	Cross-country eliminator
Bronze medal – third place	2020 Monteceneri	Cross-country eliminator

Hugo Briatta (born 24 June 1996) is a French cross-country mountain biker. He specializes in the cross-country eliminator event, in which he finished second at the world championships in 2018 and 2019. He was also the European champion in 2019.

He is also an engineer, and graduated from INSA Rouen in 2020.

== Major results ==
2017
UCI XCE World Cup

1st Antwerp

2nd National Under-23 XCO Championships
2018
2nd UCI World XCE Championships
2nd National XCE Championships
2019
1st Overall UCI XCE World Cup

1st Villard-de-Lans
1st Volterra
1st Graz

1st European XCE Championships
1st National XCE Championships
2nd UCI World XCE Championships
2020
3rd European XCE Championships
3rd National XCE Championships
