= Florent Payet =

French mountain biker

Personal information
- Born: 21 November 1986 (age 39) Saint-Denis, Réunion, France

Cycling career
- Sport: Cycling
- Discipline: Downhill
- Role: Rider
Medal record
Representing France
Mountain bike racing
World Championships
Silver medal – second place	2004 Les Gets	Junior downhill
Bronze medal – third place	2016 Val di Sole	Downhill

Florent Payet (born 21 November 1986) is a French downhill mountain biker. In 2016, he finished third at the UCI Downhill World Championships in Val di Sole, Italy.

== Major results ==
2004
1st European Junior Downhill Championships
2nd UCI Junior Downhill World Championships
3nd National Downhill Championships
2007
3rd European Downhill Championships
2008
1st European Downhill Championships
3rd National Downhill Championships
2013
3rd National Downhill Championships
2016
3rd UCI Downhill World Championships
3rd National Downhill Championships
2017
1st European Downhill Championships
