= Stéphane Tempier =

French cyclist

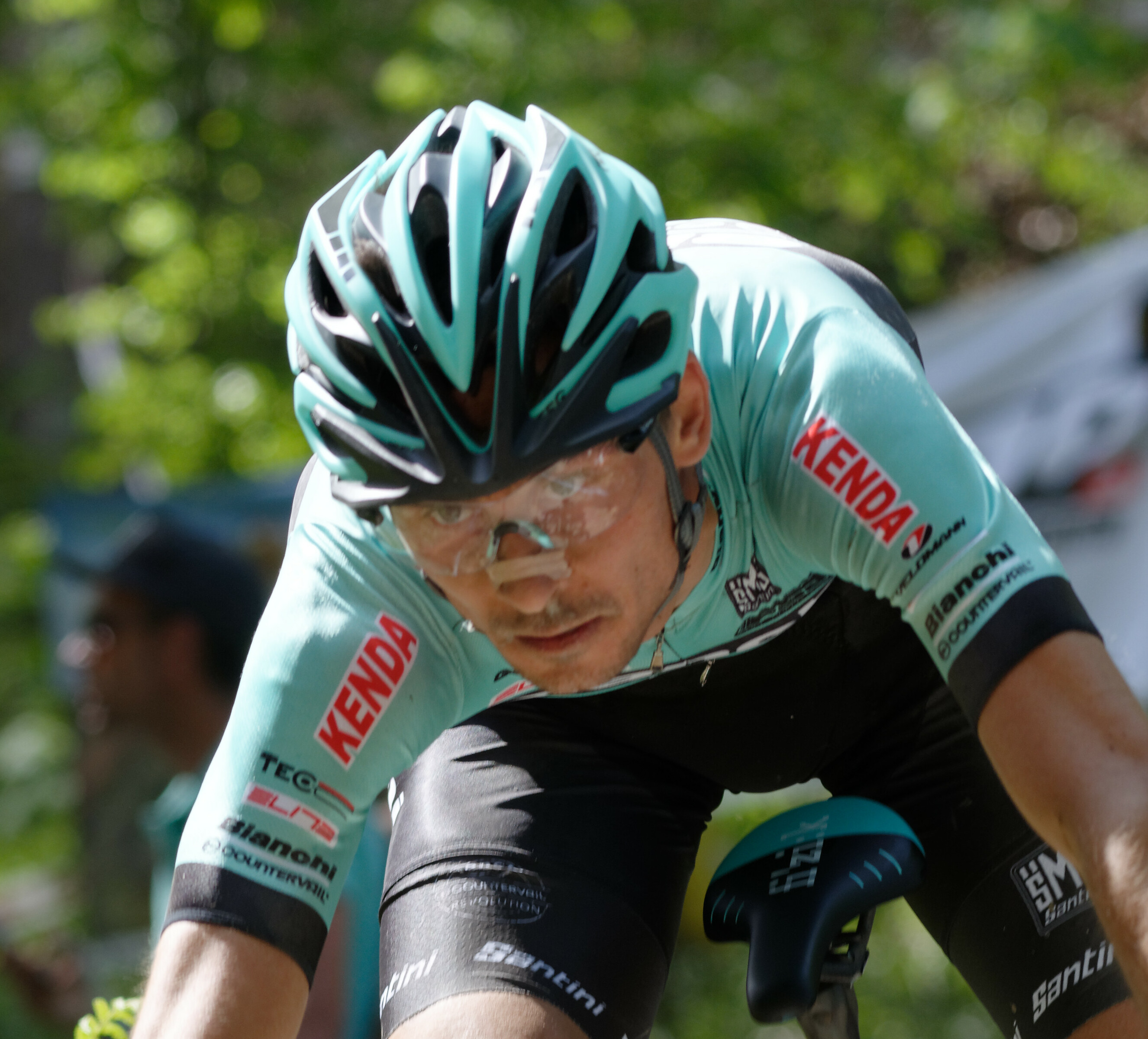
- Tempier in 2007

Personal information
- Full name: Stéphane Tempier
- Born: 5 March 1986 (age 40)
- Height: 183 cm (6 ft 0 in)
- Weight: 63 kg (139 lb)

Cycling career
- Sport: Cycling
- Current team: Trek Factory Racing
- Disciplines: Mountain biking, Road cycling
- Rider type: Cross-country

Professional teams
- 2006: Scott - Les 2 Alpes
- 2007-2008: Gewiss - Bianchi
- 2009-2012: TX Active Bianchi
- 2013-2015: BH - SR Suntour - KMC
- 2016-2019: Bianchi Countervail
- 2020-: Trek Factory Racing

Major wins
- Roc d'Azur 2012
Medal record
Representing France
Men's mountain bike racing
World Championships
Silver medal – second place	2004	Junior cross-country
Bronze medal – third place	2019 Mont-Sainte-Anne	Cross-country
Bronze medal – third place	2005	Cross-country team relay
European Championships
Silver medal – second place	2006	Mixed relay
Silver medal – second place	2008	Under-23 cross-country
French National Championships
Gold medal – first place	2006	Under-23 cross-country
Gold medal – first place	2007	Under-23 cross-country

Stéphane Tempier (born 5 March 1986) is a French cross-country mountain biker who races for the Trek Factory Racing. He won the silver medal in the junior cross country at the 2004 world championships in Les Gets, France. At the 2005 world championships he won the bronze medal in the cross country team relay, riding the men's under-23 leg for the French team.

Tempier represented France in the mountain bike cross country at the 2012 Summer Olympics and finished in 11th place, 2:23 behind the winner. He was on the start list for the 2018 Cross-country European Championship and he finished 6th. The following year he won the bronze medal at the 2019 World Championships in Mont-Sainte Anne, Canada.

== Palmares ==
=== Olympic Games ===
Mountain bike, men

- 11th in 2012

=== World Championships ===
Junior cross-country

- 2nd in 2004

Under-23 cross-country

- 30th in 2005
- 4th in 2006
- 27th in 2007
- 5th in 2008

Elite men cross-country

- 12th in 2009
- 15th in 2010
- 30th in 2011
- 9th in 2012
- 9th in 2013
- 40th in 2014
- 15th in 2015
- 5th in 2016
- 15th in 2017
- 11th in 2018
- 3rd in 2019
- DNF in 2020

Cross-country team relay

- 4th in 2004
- 3rd in 2005
- 4th in 2006

=== World Cup ===
Elite men cross-country

- 16th in 2009
- 15th in 2010
- 9th in 2011
- 15th in 2012
- 12th in 2013
- 5th in 2014
- 6th in 2016
- 38th in 2015
- 2nd in 2017
- 10th in 2018
- 6th in 2019
- 57th in 2020
