= Thibaut Dapréla =

French mountain biker

Personal information
- Born: 2 February 2001 (age 25)

Cycling career
- Sport: Cycling
- Current team: Canyon Collective (Canyon Cllctv)
- Discipline: Downhill
- Role: Rider

Professional team
- 1st: Commencal / Muc Off Team 2nd: Canyon Collective (Canyon Cllctv)

Thibaut Dapréla (born 2 February 2001) is a French downhill mountain biker. He finished second overall in the 2021 UCI Downhill World Cup and won the round in Les Gets.

== Major results ==
2018
1st Overall UCI Junior Downhill World Cup

1st Lošinj
1st Vallnord
1st Val di Sole
1st Mont-Sainte-Anne
1st La Bresse
2nd Fort William
2nd Leogang

2019
1st Overall UCI Junior Downhill World Cup

1st Maribor
1st Fort William
1st Leogang
1st Les Gets
1st Snowshoe

1st National DH Championships
2021
2nd Overall UCI Downhill World Cup

1st Les Gets
2nd Leogang
3rd Lenzerheide
