= Marcel Guerrini =

Swiss cyclist (born 1994)

Personal information
- Nickname: Marcello
- Born: 20 September 1994 (age 32)
- Height: 1.83 m (6 ft 0 in)
- Weight: 68 kg (150 lb)

Cycling career
- Sport: Cycling
- Current team: BIXS Performance Race Team
- Discipline: Cross-country
- Role: Rider

Professional teams
- 2011–2018: Focus MIG Team
- 2019: JB Brunex Felt Factory Team
- 2020: No Team contract (injury)
- 2021: Torpado Ursus
- 2022-now: BIXS Performance Racing
Medal record
Representing Switzerland
Men's Mountain bike racing
European Championships
Gold medal – first place	2016 Jonkoping	Team relay
Bronze medal – third place	2016 Jonkoping	Under-23 Cross-country

Marcel Guerrini (born 20 September 1994) is a Swiss cyclist, who specializes in cross-country mountain biking. He currently rides for UCI mountain bike team BIXS Performance Race Team.

== Career ==
Before becoming pro

Marcel Guerrini started very young with cycling. He finished his first races with 7 years old on the podium, which started his career and love for cycling. Due to his early successes, he was considered one of the best young talents in Switzerland. In addition to sports, he attended the UNITED school of sports. Marcel has completed commercial apprenticeship. After completing his apprenticeship, he immediately received a professional contract and has been a professional mountain biker ever since.

Pro career

His early success lead him to a pro contract with Focus MIG Team for the U-23 category. His top results include Swiss Champion Title, Winner at Andorra World Cup, 3rd on World Championship and 1st on Team Relay European Championship. In 2020, he suffered an unknown knee injury, which lead him to rest and with no contract during COVID time. In 2022, he started in the new BIXE Performance Race Team as the team leader. Since then he is back as one of the best Swiss and international rider with multiple podiums.

== Major results ==
2016
1st Team relay, UEC European Championships
3rd Overall UCI Under-23 XCO World Cup

1st Vallnord
3rd Albstadt

3rd Cross-country, UEC European Under-23 Championships
2022
5th Cross-country, UCI World Championships
2023
UCI XCO World Cup

3rd Snowshoe
3rd Mont-Sainte-Anne
4th Les Gets

2024
1st Overall Bike Revolution

1st Engelberg
2nd Huttwil
3rd Gruyères

2nd Short track, National Championships
UCI XCO World Cup

3rd Nové Město
4rd Lake Placid

2025
Bike Revolution

1st Engelberg
1st Gruyères

Swiss Bike Cup

3rd Schaan

UCI XCO World Cup

5th Mont-Sainte-Anne
