= 2020 UCI Mountain Bike World Championships =

International sports competition

2020 World Championships
- Location: Leogang, Austria
- Dates: 5–11 October

The 2020 UCI Mountain Bike World Championships was held in Leogang, Austria, from 5–11 October 2020. This was the 31st edition of the most prestigious mountain bike event on the calendar, held annually since 1990.

== Medal summary ==
* Host nation (Austria)

| Rank | Nation | Gold | Silver | Bronze | Total |
|---|---|---|---|---|---|
| 1 | France | 6 | 2 | 4 | 12 |
| 2 | Great Britain | 3 | 1 | 1 | 5 |
| 3 | Switzerland | 1 | 3 | 3 | 7 |
| 4 | Austria* | 1 | 2 | 0 | 3 |
| 5 | Germany | 1 | 1 | 0 | 2 |
| 6 | Ireland | 1 | 0 | 0 | 1 |
| 7 | Italy | 0 | 2 | 0 | 2 |
| 8 | Hungary | 0 | 1 | 0 | 1 |
| 8 | United States | 0 | 1 | 0 | 1 |
| 10 | Australia | 0 | 0 | 1 | 1 |
| 10 | Czech Republic | 0 | 0 | 1 | 1 |
| 10 | Denmark | 0 | 0 | 1 | 1 |
| 10 | Netherlands | 0 | 0 | 1 | 1 |
| 10 | Slovenia | 0 | 0 | 1 | 1 |
| Totals (14 entries) | | 13 | 13 | 13 | 39 |

=== Men's events ===
| Event | Gold | Silver | Bronze |
|---|---|---|---|
| Elite Cross-country | Jordan Sarrou; France | Mathias Flückiger; Switzerland | Titouan Carod; France |
| Under-23 cross-country | Tom Pidcock; Great Britain | Christopher Blevins; United States | Joel Roth; Switzerland |
| Junior cross-country | Lennart-Jan Krayer; Germany | Janis Baumann; Switzerland | Luca Martin; France |
| Downhill | Reece Wilson; Great Britain | David Trummer; Austria | Rémi Thirion; France |
| Junior Downhill | Oisin O'Callaghan; Ireland | Daniel Slack; Great Britain | James Elliott; Great Britain |
| Electric MTB Cross-country | Tom Pidcock; Great Britain | Jérôme Gilloux; France | Simon Andreassen; Denmark |

=== Women's events ===
| Event | Gold | Silver | Bronze |
|---|---|---|---|
| Elite Cross-country | Pauline Ferrand-Prévot; France | Eva Lechner; Italy | Rebecca McConnell; Australia |
| Under-23 Cross-country | Loana Lecomte; France | Kata Blanka Vas; Hungary | Ceylin del Carmen Alvarado; Netherlands |
| Junior Cross-country | Mona Mitterwallner; Austria | Luisa Daubermann; Germany | Aneta Novotná; Czech Republic |
| Downhill | Camille Balanche; Switzerland | Myriam Nicole; France | Monika Hrastnik; Slovenia |
| Junior Downhill | Lauryne Chappaz; France | Sophie Gutöhrle; Austria | Léona Pierrini; France |
| Electric MTB Cross-country | Mélanie Pugin; France | Kathrin Stirnemann; Switzerland | Nathalie Schneitter; Switzerland |

=== Team events ===
| Event | Gold | Silver | Bronze |
|---|---|---|---|
| Cross-country Olympic | France; Mathis Azzaro; Luca Martin; Loana Lecomte; Léna Gérault; Olivia Onesti; Jordan Sarrou | Italy; Luca Braidot; Eva Lechner; Filippo Agostinacchio; Nicole Pesse; Marika Tovo; Juri Zanotti | Switzerland; Luke Wiedmann; Thomas Litscher; Sina Frei; Noëlle Buri; Elisa Alvarez; Alexandre Balmer |
