= Miranda Miller (cyclist) =

Canadian downhill mountain biker (born 1990)

Personal information
- Born: 2 March 1990 (age 36) Squamish, British Columbia, Canada

Cycling career
- Sport: Cycling
- Discipline: Downhill
- Role: Rider
Medal record
Representing Canada
Women's mountain bike racing
World Championships
Gold medal – first place	2017 Cairns	Downhill

Miranda Miller (born 2 March 1990) is a Canadian downhill mountain biker.

She was the gold medalist in the downhill event at the 2017 UCI Mountain Bike World Championships.
