= Sandra Temporelli =

French cyclist

Personal information
- Born: 25 January 1969 (age 57)

Cycling career
- Sport: Cycling

Sandra Temporelli (born 25 January 1969) is a French former cyclist. She competed in the women's cross-country event at the 1996 Summer Olympics.
