= Hugo Drechou =

French cyclist

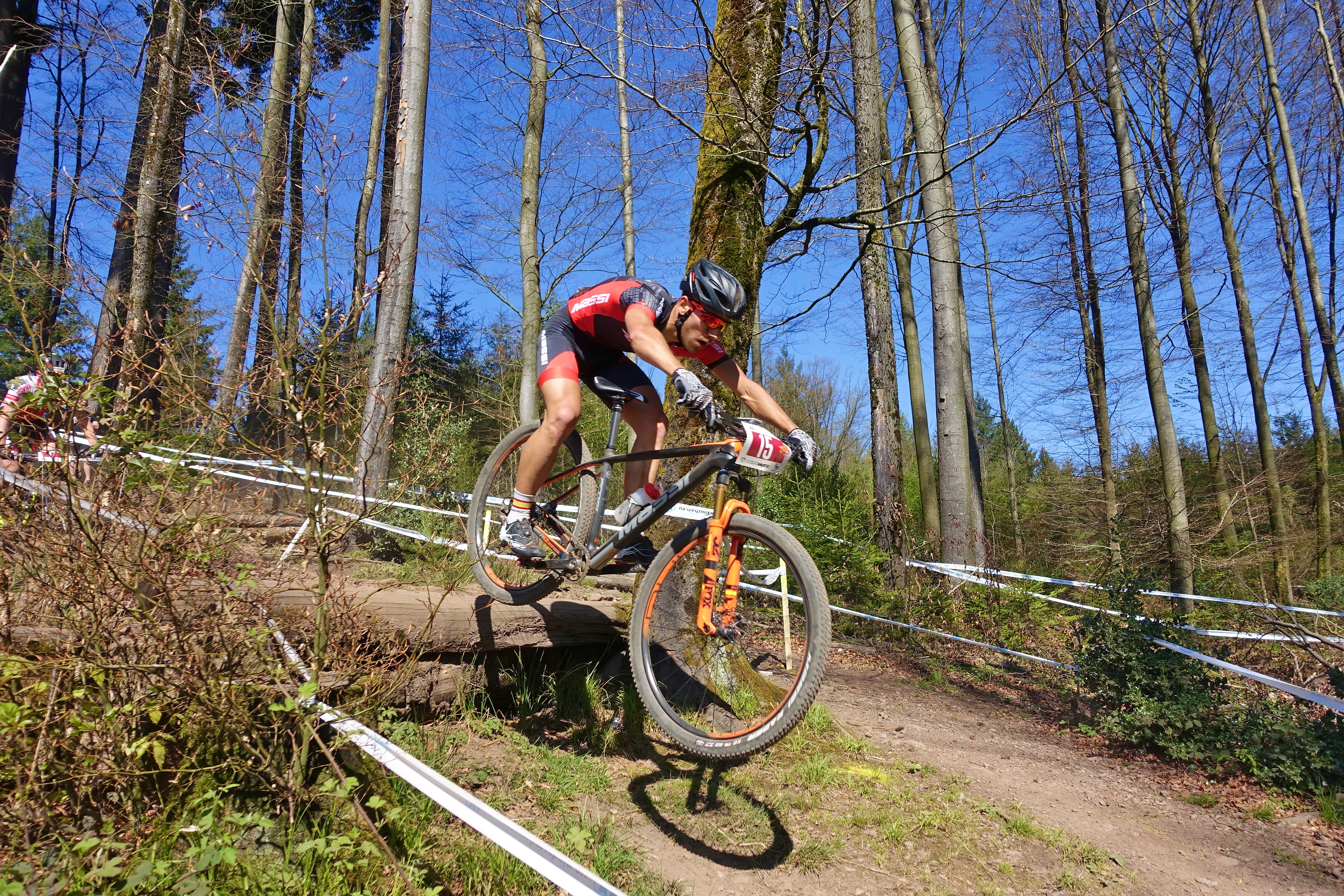
- Drechou in 2017

Personal information
- Born: 31 May 1991 (age 35) Céret, France

Cycling career
- Sport: Cycling
- Discipline: Mountain biking
- Role: Rider
- Rider type: Cross-country, cross-country marathon
Medal record
Representing France
Men's mountain bike racing
World Championships
Bronze medal – third place	2009 Canberra	Team relay
European Championships
Bronze medal – third place	2013 Bern	Under-23 cross-country

Hugo Drechou (born 31 May 1991) is a French cross-country mountain biker.

== Major results ==
2009
3rd Team relay, UCI World Championships
2013
2nd Overall UCI Under-23 XCO World Cup

1st Vallnord

2nd National Under-23 XCO Championships
3rd European Under-23 XCO Championships
2014
2nd National XCO Championships
2015
2nd National XCM Championships
2019
3rd National XCM Championships
2020
1st National XCM Championships
