= 2019 UCI Mountain Bike World Championships =

International sports competition

2019 World Championships
- Location: Mont-Sainte-Anne, Canada
- Dates: August 28 - September 1

The 2019 UCI Mountain Bike World Championships was held in Mont-Sainte-Anne, Canada, from August 28 to September 1, 2019. This was the 30th edition of the most prestigious mountain bike event on the calendar, held annually since 1990, and the senior and under-23 cross-country races also functioned as a qualifier for the cross-country race at the 2020 Summer Olympics.

== Medal summary ==
Rank	Nation	Gold	Silver	Bronze	Total
1	Switzerland (SUI)	1	2	0	3
2	France (FRA)	1	0	1	2
3	Australia (AUS)	0	0	1	1
Totals (3 entries)		2	2	2	6

=== Men's events ===
Event	Gold	Silver	Bronze
Elite Cross-country	Nino Schurter; Switzerland	Mathias Flückiger; Switzerland	Stephane Tempier; France
Under-23 cross-country	Vlad Dascalu; Romania	Filippo Colombo; Switzerland	Vital Albin; Switzerland
Junior cross-country	Charlie Aldridge; Great Britain	Luca Martin; France	Andreas Vittone; Italy
Downhill	Loic Bruni; France	Troy Brosnan; Australia	Amaury Pierron; France
Junior Downhill	Kye A'Hern; Australia	Antoine Vidal; France	Tuhoto-Ariki Pene; New Zealand
Electric MTB Cross-country	Alan Hatherly; South Africa	Jérôme Gilloux; France	Julien Absalon; France

=== Women's events ===
Event	Gold	Silver	Bronze
Elite Cross-country	Pauline Ferrand-Prévot; France	Jolanda Neff; Switzerland	Rebecca McConnell; Australia
Under-23 Cross-country	Sina Frei; Switzerland	Laura Stigger; Austria	Loana Lecomte; France
Junior Cross-country	Jacqueline Schneebeli; Switzerland	Mona Mitterwallner; Austria	Helene Marie Fossesholm; Norway
Downhill	Myriam Nicole; France	Tahnee Seagrave; Great Britain	Marine Cabirou; France
Junior Downhill	Valentina Höll; Austria	Mille Johnset; Norway	Anna Newkirk; United States
Electric MTB Cross-country	Nathalie Schneitter; Switzerland	Maghalie Rochette; Canada	Anneke Beerten; Netherlands

=== Team events ===
Event	Gold	Silver	Bronze
Cross-country Olympic	Switzerland; Joel Roth; Janis Baumann; Sina Frei; Jolanda Neff; Nino Schurter	United States; Christopher Blevins; Riley Amos; Haley Batten; Kate Courtney; Keegan Swenson	France; Thibault Daniel; Luca Martin; Pauline Ferrand-Prévot; Loana Lecomte; Jordan Sarrou

== Olympic qualification ==
The following National Olympic Committees earned a quota place in the cross-country event in the 2020 Summer Olympics by virtue of high finish in either the elite senior or under 23 events.

Qualification Event	Men's event		Women's event	
Qualification Event	Ranking by nation	Qualified	Ranking by nation	Qualified
2019 UCI Mountain Bike World Championships (elite)	1 to 2	Switzerland; France	1 to 2	France; Switzerland
2019 UCI Mountain Bike World Championships (under-23)	1 to 2	Romania; Chile	1 to 2	Austria; Great Britain
