= Perrine Clauzel =

French cyclist

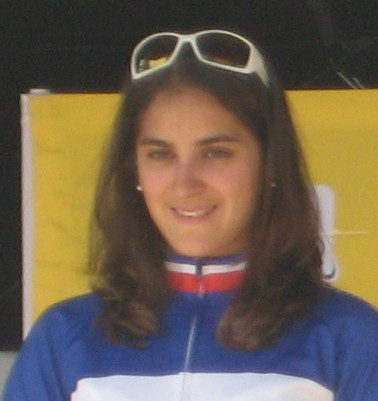
Clauzel in 2012

Perrine Clauzel (born 5 April 1994) is a French cross-country and cyclo-cross cyclist. She placed 23rd in the women's cross-country race at the 2016 Summer Olympics.
