= Jordan Sarrou =

French cyclist (born 1992)

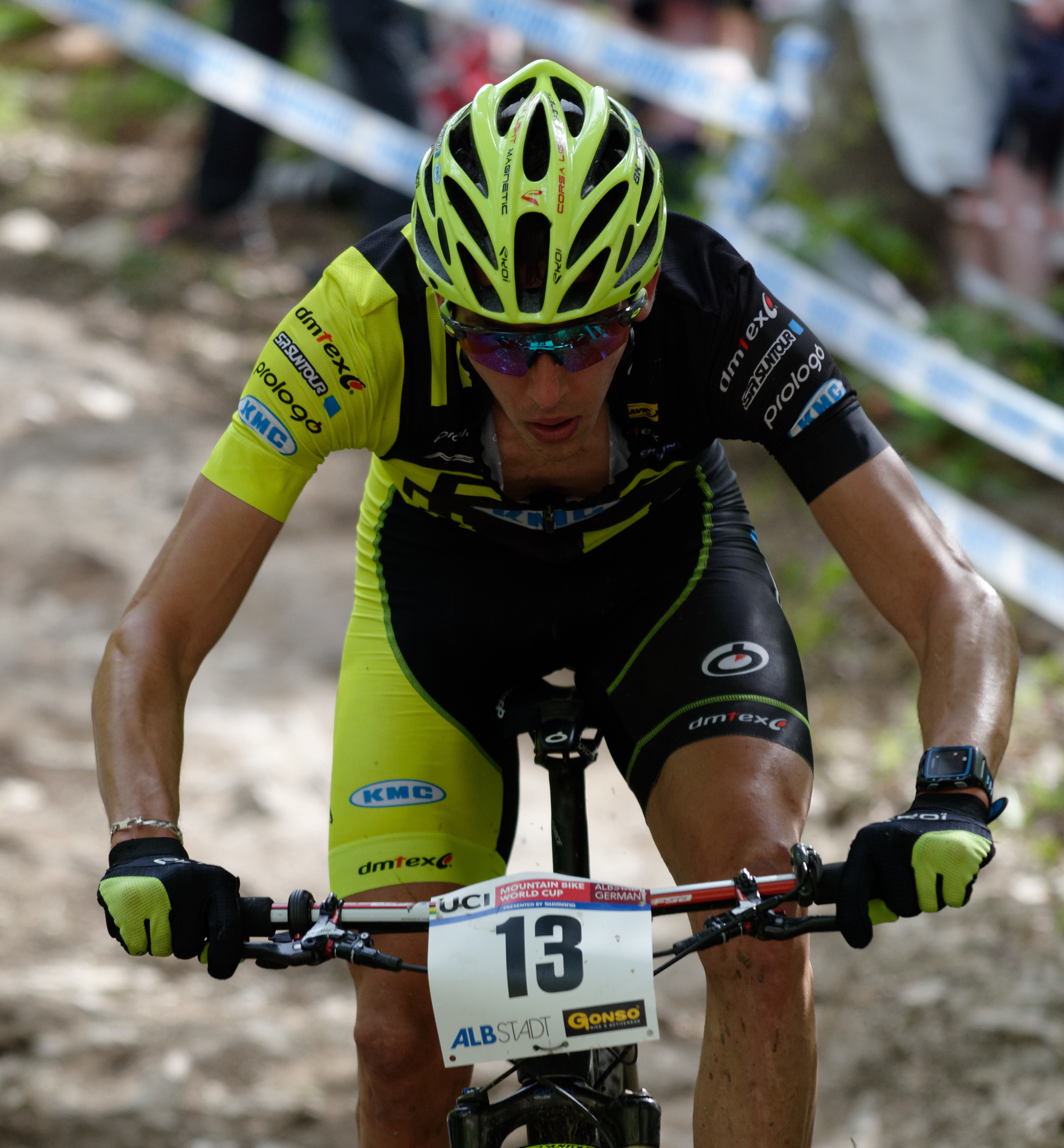
- Jordan Sarrou in 2016

Personal information
- Full name: Jordan Sarrou
- Born: 9 December 1992 (age 33) Saint-Étienne, France
- Height: 1.8 m (5 ft 11 in)
- Weight: 65 kg (143 lb)

Cycling career
- Sport: Cycling
- Current team: BMC Factory Racing
- Disciplines: Mountain biking; Road
- Role: Rider

Amateur teams
- 2013: VC Besse
- 2014–2016: Chambéry CF
- 2017: Probikeshop Saint-Étienne Loire

Professional teams
- 2010–2011: Scott–Les Saisies
- 2012: Lapierre International
- 2013: Focus–Rotor–Coaching-system.fr
- 2014–2018: Team KMC Ekoï SR Suntour
- 2019–2020: Absolute–Absalon–BMC
- 2021–2022: Specialized Factory Racing
- 2023–: Team BMC

Major wins
- Mountain bike World XC Championships (2020) National XC Championships (2020, 2024) XC World Cup 1 individual win (2023) Cape Epic (2021)
Medal record
Representing France
Mountain bike racing
World Championships
Gold medal – first place	2020 Leogang	Cross-country
Gold medal – first place	2014 Hafjell	Mixed team relay
Gold medal – first place	2015 Vallnord	Mixed team relay
Gold medal – first place	2016 Nové Město	Mixed team relay
Gold medal – first place	2021 Val di Sole	Mixed team relay
Silver medal – second place	2012 Saalfelden	Mixed team relay
Silver medal – second place	2013 Pietermaritzburg	Mixed team relay
Silver medal – second place	2014 Hafjell	Under-23 cross-country
Bronze medal – third place	2017 Cairns	Mixed team relay
Bronze medal – third place	2019 Mont-Sainte-Anne	Mixed team relay
European Championships
Gold medal – first place	2013 Bern	Under-23 cross-country
Gold medal – first place	2014 Sankt Wendel	Under-23 cross-country
Gold medal – first place	2014 Sankt Wendel	Mixed team relay
Silver medal – second place	2016 Huskvarna	Mixed team relay

Jordan Sarrou (born 9 December 1992) is a French mountain biking competitor, who currently rides for UCI Mountain Bike team BMC Factory Racing. He won the UCI Mountain Bike World Championships at Leogang, Austria in 2020. He has also competed in road cycling infrequently, finishing third in the 2014 Ruota d'Oro.

== Major results ==
2009
1st Cross-country, National Junior Championships
2012
1st Cross-country, National Under-23 Championships
2nd Team relay, UCI World Championships
2013
1st Cross-country, UEC European Under-23 Championships
2nd Team relay, UCI World Championships
3rd Cross-country, National Under-23 Championships
2014
UCI World Championships

1st Team relay
2nd Under-23 Cross-country

UEC European Championships

1st Under-23 Cross-country
1st Team relay

1st Cross-country, National Under-23 Championships
1st Overall UCI Under-23 XCO World Cup

1st Pietermaritzburg
1st Albstadt
1st Windham
1st Méribel
2nd Cairns
2nd Nové Město
2nd Mont-Sainte-Anne

1st Roc d'Azur
3rd Ruota d'Oro
2015
1st Team relay, UCI World Championships
3rd Cross-country, National Championships
2016
1st Team relay, UCI World Championships
1st Roc d'Azur
2nd Team relay, UEC European Championships
2017
3rd Team relay, UCI World Championships
UCI XCO World Cup

3rd Vallnord

2019
1st Roc d'Azur
2nd Cross-country, National Championships
3rd Team relay, UCI World Championships
UCI XCO World Cup

3rd Albstadt

2020
1st Cross-country, UCI World Championships
1st Cross-country, National Championships
French Cup

2nd Alpe d'Huez

Swiss Bike Cup

3rd Leukerbad

2021
1st Team relay, UCI World Championships
1st Overall Cape Epic (with Matthew Beers)

1st Prologue & Stage 2

French Cup

1st Guéret
2nd Lons-le-Saunier

2nd Cross-country, National Championships
UCI XCC World Cup

2nd Les Gets
3rd Nové Město

UCI XCO World Cup

3rd Les Gets

Swiss Bike Cup

3rd Basel

2022
French Cup

1st Le Dévoluy
2nd Le Bessat

Ökk Bike Revolution

1st Chur

1st Roc d'Azur
2nd Cross-country, National Championships
UCI XCC World Cup

2nd Albstadt

UCI XCO World Cup

3rd Val di Sole

2023
2nd Overall UCI XCO World Cup

1st Snowshoe
3rd Lenzerheide
4th Vallnord

2nd Overall UCI XCC World Cup

1st Leogang
2nd Lenzerheide
2nd Les Gets
2nd Snowshoe
2nd Mont-Sainte-Anne
3rd Vallnord

XCO French Cup

1st Marseille–Luminy
2nd Lons-le-Saunier

2nd Team relay, UCI World Championships
2nd Cross-country, National Championships
2024
1st Cross-country, National Championships
1st Roc d'Azur
XCO French Cup

1st Puy-Saint-Vincent

Swiss Bike Cup

1st Rivera

XCC French Cup

1st Puy-Saint-Vincent

Shimano Super Cup

2nd Banyoles

UCI XCO World Cup

4th Mairiporã
5th Araxá
