= Morgane Charre =

French downhill mountain biker

Personal information
- Born: 9 June 1990 (age 36)

Cycling career
- Sport: Cycling
- Discipline: Downhill
- Role: Rider
Medal record
Representing France
Women's mountain bike racing
World Championships
Gold medal – first place	2012 Leogang-Saalfelden	Downhill
European Championships
Silver medal – second place	2013 Pamporovo	Four-cross
Silver medal – second place	2013 Pamporovo	Downhill
Silver medal – second place	2018 Lousã	Downhill

Morgane Charre (born 9 June 1990) is a French downhill mountain biker.

She won the downhill event at the 2012 UCI Mountain Bike World Championships.
