= Vanessa Quin =

New Zealand cyclist

Vanessa Quin (born 15 October 1976) is a world champion BMX and downhill rider from New Zealand.

Quin competed in BMX events as a child, and moved into downhill mountain biking while at university. She was sponsored by Dirt magazine and raced internationally for about 10 years. In 2002, Quin broke her neck while competing at the New Zealand national event, but made a full recovery and returned to racing. Quin represented New Zealand at 12 world championship events, including the 2004 event, when she won the elite women's section. She was the first New Zealander to win a world elite championship in downhill mountain bike. She was nominated as a finalist for the Halberg Award for Sportswoman of the Year 2004.

In 2008, Quin retired from the sport to have children. She returned in 2013 and entered and won the New Zealand national BMX event. She also entered and won the 30 years and over women's section at the BMX World Championships held in Auckland the same year.
