= Rémi Thirion =

French mountain biker

Personal information
- Born: 23 April 1990 (age 36) Saint-Dié-des-Vosges, France

Cycling career
- Sport: Cycling
- Current team: Giant Factory Off Road Team
- Discipline: Downhill
- Role: Rider

Professional teams
- 2012–2020: Commencal / Muc Off team
- 2021–: Giant Factory Off Road Team
Medal record
Representing France
Mountain bike racing
World Championships
Bronze medal – third place	2020 Leogang	Downhill

Rémi Thirion (born 23 April 1990) is a French downhill mountain biker. In 2020, he finished third in the UCI Downhill World Championships in Leogang, Austria.

== Major results ==
2008
1st European Junior Downhill Championships
2009
3rd European Downhill Championships
2013
1st Vallnord, UCI Downhill World Cup
2020
3rd Downhill, UCI Mountain Bike World Championships
