= Myriam Nicole =

French cyclist

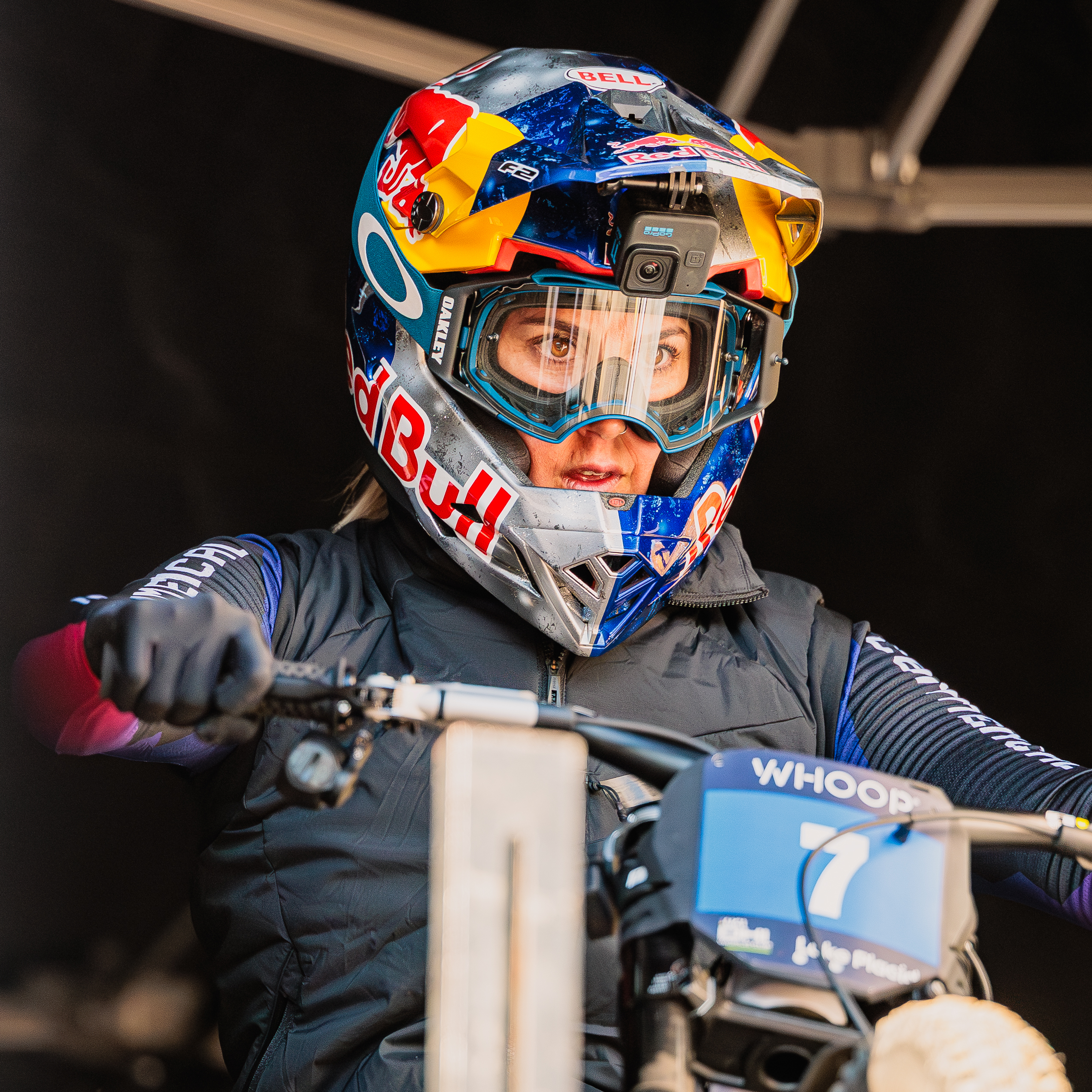

Personal information
- Born: 8 February 1990 (age 36) Montpellier, France

Cycling career
- Sport: Cycling
- Current team: Commencal / Muc Off
- Disciplines: Downhill; Mountain bike racing
- Role: Rider
Medal record
Representing France
Women's mountain bike racing
World Championships
Gold medal – first place	2019 Mont-Saint-Anne	Downhill
Gold medal – first place	2021 Val di Sole	Downhill
Silver medal – second place	2016 Val di Sole	Downhill
Silver medal – second place	2017 Cairns	Downhill
Silver medal – second place	2020 Leogang	Downhill
Silver medal – second place	2024 Vallnord	Downhill
Silver medal – second place	2025 Valais	Downhill
Bronze medal – third place	2018 Lenzerheide	Downhill
Bronze medal – third place	2022 Les Gets	Downhill

Myriam Nicole (born 8 February 1990) is a French downhill mountain bike racer and is a two-time UCI World Champion.

== Career ==
Born in Montpellier, Nicole began riding bikes as a child, choosing to focus on downhill racing from the age of 14. As a junior, she landed podiums at national races, before achieving third place at the 2007 Junior World Championships in Fort William, Scotland, rising to second place a year later at the 2008 Junior Worlds in Val di Sole, Italy.

As an elite rider, she is a two-time World Champion, winning the 2019 UCI Mountain Bike World Championships in Mont-Sainte-Anne, Canada and the 2021 World Championships in Val di Sole, Italy. She is a five-time World Championships elite silver medallist.

On the World Cup circuit she has won 10 rounds; winning the 2017 UCI Downhill World Cup overall. She has finished on the World Cup podium over 60 times in her career.

== Personal life ==
She is a trained physiotherapist, completing her studies at the Institut Masseur Kinésithérapeute (IFMK) in Montpellier in 2018, although she admits she does not see herself working in a clinic, but rather with athletes in the field.
