= 2013 UCI Mountain Bike World Cup =

Series of races for all-terrain bicyclists

- Date: May–September 2013

The 2013 UCI Mountain Bike World Cup included three disciplines: cross-country, cross-country eliminator and downhill.

== Cross-country ==
| Date | Venue | Podium (Men) | Podium (Women) |
|---|---|---|---|
| 19 May 2013 | (Germany) Albstadt | (Australia) Daniel McConnell | (Italy) Eva Lechner |
| 19 May 2013 | (Germany) Albstadt | (Spain) Sergio Mantecón | (Poland) Maja Włoszczowska |
| 19 May 2013 | (Germany) Albstadt | (Czech Republic) Jaroslav Kulhavý | (Switzerland) Katrin Leumann |
| 26 May 2013 | (Czech Republic) Nové Město na Moravě | (Switzerland) Nino Schurter | (Slovenia) Tanja Žakelj |
| 26 May 2013 | (Czech Republic) Nové Město na Moravě | (France) Julien Absalon | (Poland) Maja Włoszczowska |
| 26 May 2013 | (Czech Republic) Nové Město na Moravě | (Switzerland) Lukas Flückiger | (Canada) Catharine Pendrel |
| 15 June 2013 | (Italy) Val di Sole | (Switzerland) Nino Schurter | (Slovenia) Tanja Žakelj |
| 15 June 2013 | (Italy) Val di Sole | (France) Julien Absalon | (Czech Republic) Kateřina Nash |
| 15 June 2013 | (Italy) Val di Sole | (Czech Republic) Jaroslav Kulhavý | (Canada) Emily Batty |
| 27 July 2013 | (Andorra) Vallnord | (Switzerland) Nino Schurter | (Germany) Sabine Spitz |
| 27 July 2013 | (Andorra) Vallnord | (Czech Republic) Ondřej Cink | (Czech Republic) Kateřina Nash |
| 27 July 2013 | (Andorra) Vallnord | (France) Stéphane Tempier | (Italy) Eva Lechner |
| 10 August 2013 | (Canada) Mont-Sainte-Anne | (France) Julien Absalon | (Czech Republic) Kateřina Nash |
| 10 August 2013 | (Canada) Mont-Sainte-Anne | (Spain) José Antonio Hermida | (Poland) Maja Włoszczowska |
| 10 August 2013 | (Canada) Mont-Sainte-Anne | (Switzerland) Nino Schurter | (Slovenia) Tanja Žakelj |
| 14 September 2013 | (Norway) Hafjell | (Czech Republic) Jaroslav Kulhavý | (Russia) Irina Kalentieva |
| 14 September 2013 | (Norway) Hafjell | (Switzerland) Nino Schurter | (Italy) Eva Lechner |
| 14 September 2013 | (Norway) Hafjell | (Germany) Manuel Fumic | (France) Julie Bresset |
| | | Podium (Men) | Podium (Women) |
| Final Standings | UCI World Cup; Cross Country Championship | (Switzerland) Nino Schurter | (Slovenia) Tanja Žakelj |
| Final Standings | UCI World Cup; Cross Country Championship | (Australia) Daniel McConnell | (Italy) Eva Lechner |
| Final Standings | UCI World Cup; Cross Country Championship | (France) Julien Absalon | (Czech Republic) Kateřina Nash |

== Cross-country Eliminator ==
| Date | Venue | Podium (Men) | Podium (Women) |
|---|---|---|---|
| 17 May 2013 | (Germany) Albstadt | (Austria) Daniel Federspiel | (Sweden) Alexandra Engen |
| 17 May 2013 | (Germany) Albstadt | (Switzerland) Thomas Litscher | (Switzerland) Kathrin Stirnemann |
| 17 May 2013 | (Germany) Albstadt | (Slovenia) Miha Halzer | (Germany) Nadine Rieder |
| 24 May 2013 | (Czech Republic) Nové Město na Moravě | (United Kingdom) Kenta Gallagher | (Sweden) Jenny Rissveds |
| 24 May 2013 | (Czech Republic) Nové Město na Moravě | (Germany) Christian Pfäffle | (Switzerland) Kathrin Stirnemann |
| 24 May 2013 | (Czech Republic) Nové Město na Moravě | (Germany) Simon Gegenheimer | (Sweden) Alexandra Engen |
| 13 June 2013 | (Italy) Val di Sole | (Austria) Daniel Federspiel | (Sweden) Alexandra Engen |
| 13 June 2013 | (Italy) Val di Sole | (Slovenia) Miha Halzer | (Switzerland) Kathrin Stirnemann |
| 13 June 2013 | (Italy) Val di Sole | (Germany) Simon Gegenheimer | (Switzerland) Linda Indergand |
| 25 July 2013 | (Andorra) Vallnord | (Belgium) Fabrice Mels | (Switzerland) Kathrin Stirnemann |
| 25 July 2013 | (Andorra) Vallnord | (Argentina) Catriel Andres Soto | (Sweden) Alexandra Engen |
| 25 July 2013 | (Andorra) Vallnord | (France) Titouan Perrin Ganier | (Sweden) Jenny Rissveds |
| 12 September 2013 | (Norway) Hafjell | (Germany) Simon Gegenheimer | (Sweden) Jenny Rissveds |
| 12 September 2013 | (Norway) Hafjell | (Sweden) Matthias Wengelin | (Italy) Eva Lechner |
| 12 September 2013 | (Norway) Hafjell | (Argentina) Catriel Andres Soto | (Sweden) Alexandra Engen |
| | | Podium (Men) | Podium (Women) |
| Final Standings | UCI World Cup; Cross-country Eliminator Championship | (Austria) Daniel Federspiel | (Sweden) Alexandra Engen |
| Final Standings | UCI World Cup; Cross-country Eliminator Championship | (Germany) Simon Gegenheimer | (Switzerland) Kathrin Stirnemann |
| Final Standings | UCI World Cup; Cross-country Eliminator Championship | (Belgium) Fabrice Mels | (Sweden) Jenny Rissveds |

== Downhill ==
| Date | Venue | Podium (Men) | Podium (Women) |
|---|---|---|---|
| 9 June 2013 | (United Kingdom) Fort William | (United Kingdom) Gee Atherton | (United Kingdom) Rachel Atherton |
| 9 June 2013 | (United Kingdom) Fort William | (New Zealand) Brook Macdonald | (United Kingdom) Manon Carpenter |
| 9 June 2013 | (United Kingdom) Fort William | (Canada) Steve Smith | (France) Emmeline Ragot |
| 16 June 2013 | (Italy) Val di Sole | (United Kingdom) Gee Atherton | (United Kingdom) Rachel Atherton |
| 16 June 2013 | (Italy) Val di Sole | (Canada) Steve Smith | (France) Emmeline Ragot |
| 16 June 2013 | (Italy) Val di Sole | (South Africa) Greg Minnaar | (France) Floriane Pugin |
| 28 July 2013 | (Andorra) Vallnord | (France) Rémi Thirion | (United Kingdom) Rachel Atherton |
| 28 July 2013 | (Andorra) Vallnord | (United Kingdom) Gee Atherton | (United Kingdom) Manon Carpenter |
| 28 July 2013 | (Andorra) Vallnord | (Australia) Sam Hill | (France) Myriam Nicole |
| 11 August 2013 | (Canada) Mont-Sainte-Anne | (Canada) Steve Smith | (France) Emmeline Ragot |
| 11 August 2013 | (Canada) Mont-Sainte-Anne | (United Kingdom) Gee Atherton | (United Kingdom) Manon Carpenter |
| 11 August 2013 | (Canada) Mont-Sainte-Anne | (Australia) Sam Hill | (France) Floriane Pugin |
| 15 September 2013 | (Norway) Hafjell | (Canada) Steve Smith | (United Kingdom) Rachel Atherton |
| 15 September 2013 | (Norway) Hafjell | (United Kingdom) Danny Hart | (United Kingdom) Manon Carpenter |
| 15 September 2013 | (Norway) Hafjell | (South Africa) Andrew Neethling | (France) Myriam Nicole |
| 22 September 2013 | (Austria) Leogang | (Canada) Steve Smith | (France) Emmeline Ragot |
| 22 September 2013 | (Austria) Leogang | (France) Loïc Bruni | (United Kingdom) Rachel Atherton |
| 22 September 2013 | (Austria) Leogang | (Australia) Michael Hannah | (United Kingdom) Manon Carpenter |
| | | Podium (Men) | Podium (Women) |
| Final Standings | UCI World Cup; Downhill Championship | (Canada) Steve Smith | (United Kingdom) Rachel Atherton |
| Final Standings | UCI World Cup; Downhill Championship | (United Kingdom) Gee Atherton | (France) Emmeline Ragot |
| Final Standings | UCI World Cup; Downhill Championship | (South Africa) Greg Minnaar | (United Kingdom) Manon Carpenter |

== See also ==
- 2013 UCI Mountain Bike & Trials World Championships
