= 2014 UCI Mountain Bike World Cup =

Series of races for all-terrain bicyclists

- Date: April–August 2014

The 2014 UCI Mountain Bike World Cup included three disciplines: cross-country, cross-country eliminator and downhill.

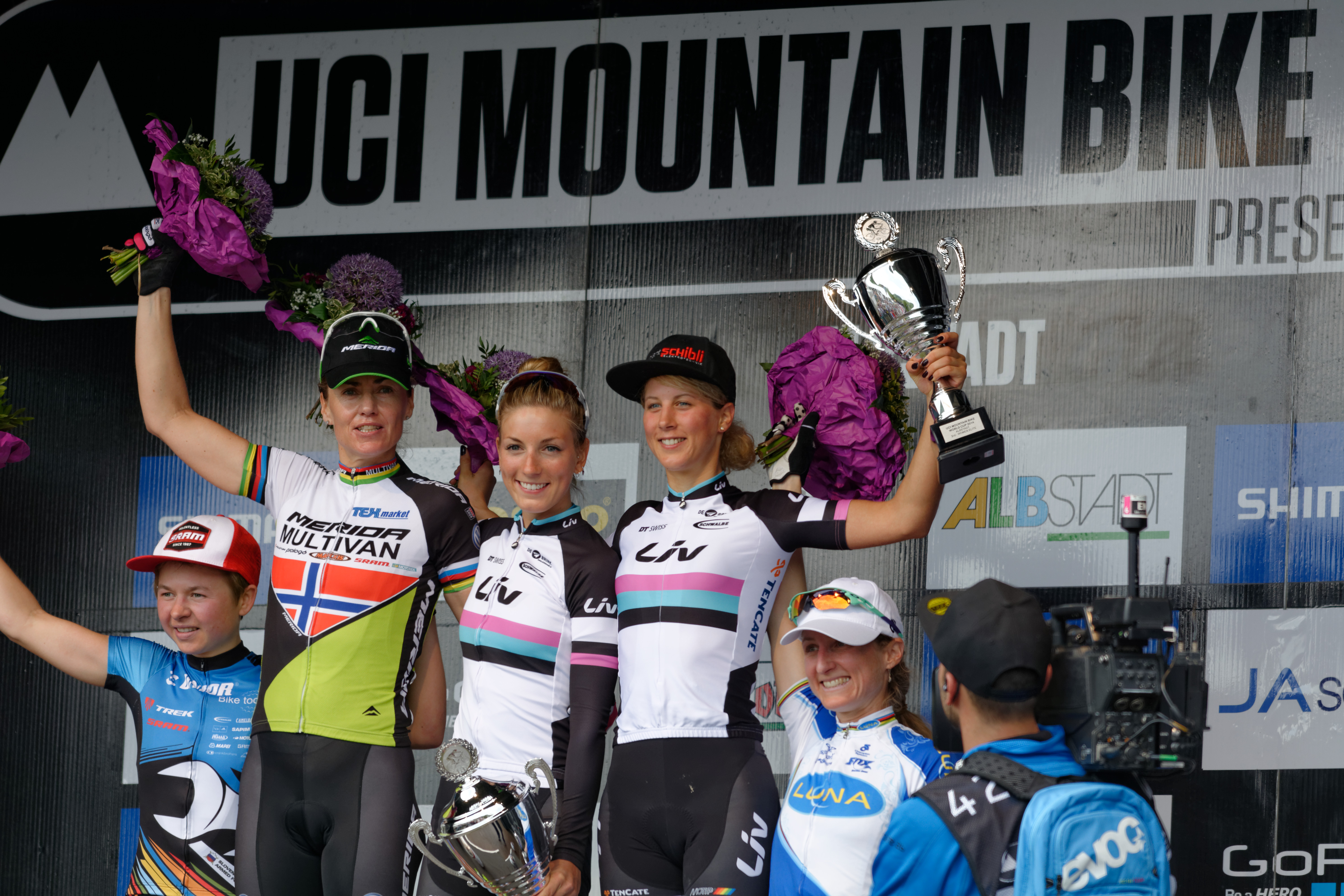
MTB World Cup Albstadt women's elite podium (from left): Tanja Žakelj, Gunn-Rita Dahle Flesjå, Pauline Ferrand-Prévot, Jolanda Neff

== Cross-country ==
=== Elite ===
Date	Venue	Podium (Men)	Podium (Women)
13 April 2014	(South Africa) Pietermaritzburg	(France) Julien Absalon	(Switzerland) Jolanda Neff
13 April 2014	(South Africa) Pietermaritzburg	(Germany) Manuel Fumic	(Norway) Gunn-Rita Dahle Flesjå
13 April 2014	(South Africa) Pietermaritzburg	(France) Maxime Marotte	(Poland) Maja Włoszczowska
27 April 2014	(Australia) Cairns	(France) Julien Absalon	(Italy) Eva Lechner
27 April 2014	(Australia) Cairns	(Switzerland) Mathias Flückiger	(Canada) Emily Batty
27 April 2014	(Australia) Cairns	(France) Maxime Marotte	(Russia) Irina Kalentieva
23 May 2014	(Czech Republic) Nové Město na Moravě	(Switzerland) Nino Schurter	(France) Pauline Ferrand-Prévot
23 May 2014	(Czech Republic) Nové Město na Moravě	(France) Stéphane Tempier	(Canada) Catharine Pendrel
23 May 2014	(Czech Republic) Nové Město na Moravě	(Germany) Moritz Milatz	(Norway) Gunn-Rita Dahle Flesjå
30 May 2014	(Germany) Albstadt	(France) Julien Absalon	(France) Pauline Ferrand-Prévot
30 May 2014	(Germany) Albstadt	(Switzerland) Nino Schurter	(Norway) Gunn-Rita Dahle Flesjå
30 May 2014	(Germany) Albstadt	(France) Stéphane Tempier	(Switzerland) Jolanda Neff
31 July 2014	(Canada) Mont-Sainte-Anne	(Switzerland) Nino Schurter	(Switzerland) Jolanda Neff
31 July 2014	(Canada) Mont-Sainte-Anne	(France) Julien Absalon	(Canada) Catharine Pendrel
31 July 2014	(Canada) Mont-Sainte-Anne	(Australia) Daniel McConnell	(Czech Republic) Kateřina Nash
7 August 2014	(United States) Windham	(Switzerland) Nino Schurter	(Canada) Catharine Pendrel
7 August 2014	(United States) Windham	(France) Julien Absalon	(Slovenia) Tanja Žakelj
7 August 2014	(United States) Windham	(Switzerland) Lukas Flückiger	(Denmark) Annika Langvad
21 August 2014	(France) Méribel	(Switzerland) Nino Schurter	(Switzerland) Jolanda Neff
21 August 2014	(France) Méribel	(France) Julien Absalon	(Norway) Gunn-Rita Dahle Flesjå
21 August 2014	(France) Méribel	(Germany) Manuel Fumic	(France) Pauline Ferrand-Prévot
		Podium (Men)	Podium (Women)
Final standings	UCI World Cup; Cross Country Championship	(France) Julien Absalon	(Switzerland) Jolanda Neff
Final standings	UCI World Cup; Cross Country Championship	(Switzerland) Nino Schurter	(Canada) Catharine Pendrel
Final standings	UCI World Cup; Cross Country Championship	(Australia) Daniel McConnell	(Slovenia) Tanja Žakelj

=== U23 ===
Date	Venue	Podium (Men)	Podium (Women)
13 April 2014	(South Africa) Pietermaritzburg	(France) Jordan Sarrou	(Sweden) Jenny Rissveds
13 April 2014	(South Africa) Pietermaritzburg	(Netherlands) Michiel van der Heijden	(France) Perrine Clauzel
13 April 2014	(South Africa) Pietermaritzburg	(United Kingdom) Grant Ferguson	(Italy) Lisa Rabensteiner
27 April 2014	(Australia) Cairns	(France) Victor Koretzky	(Germany) Helen Grobert
27 April 2014	(Australia) Cairns	(France) Jordan Sarrou	(Sweden) Jenny Rissveds
27 April 2014	(Australia) Cairns	(Netherlands) Michiel van der Heijden	(Serbia) Jovana Crnogorac
23 May 2014	(Czech Republic) Nové Město na Moravě	(Netherlands) Michiel van der Heijden	(France) Margot Moschetti
23 May 2014	(Czech Republic) Nové Město na Moravě	(France) Jordan Sarrou	(Ukraine) Yana Belomoyna
23 May 2014	(Czech Republic) Nové Město na Moravě	(New Zealand) Sam Gaze	(Italy) Lisa Rabensteiner
30 May 2014	(Germany) Albstadt	(France) Jordan Sarrou	(France) Margot Moschetti
30 May 2014	(Germany) Albstadt	(Netherlands) Michiel van der Heijden	(Ukraine) Yana Belomoyna
30 May 2014	(Germany) Albstadt	(United States) Howard Grotts	(Italy) Lisa Rabensteiner
31 July 2014	(Canada) Mont-Sainte-Anne	(Netherlands) Michiel van der Heijden	(Ukraine) Yana Belomoyna
31 July 2014	(Canada) Mont-Sainte-Anne	(France) Jordan Sarrou	(France) Margot Moschetti
31 July 2014	(Canada) Mont-Sainte-Anne	(France) Julien Trarieux	(Sweden) Jenny Rissveds
7 August 2014	(United States) Windham	(France) Jordan Sarrou	(France) Margot Moschetti
7 August 2014	(United States) Windham	(New Zealand) Anton Cooper	(Ukraine) Yana Belomoyna
7 August 2014	(United States) Windham	(United Kingdom) Grant Ferguson	(Serbia) Jovana Crnogorac
21 August 2014	(France) Méribel	(France) Jordan Sarrou	(Germany) Helen Grobert
21 August 2014	(France) Méribel	(United Kingdom) Grant Ferguson	(Ukraine) Yana Belomoyna
21 August 2014	(France) Méribel	(Netherlands) Michiel van der Heijden	(Switzerland) Linda Indergand
		Podium (Men)	Podium (Women)
Final standings	UCI World Cup; Cross Country Championship	(France) Jordan Sarrou	(Ukraine) Yana Belomoyna
Final standings	UCI World Cup; Cross Country Championship	(Netherlands) Michiel van der Heijden	(Germany) Helen Grobert
Final standings	UCI World Cup; Cross Country Championship	(France) Victor Koretzky	(Sweden) Jenny Rissveds

== Cross-country Eliminator ==
Date	Venue	Podium (Men)	Podium (Women)
27 April 2014	(Australia) Cairns	(New Zealand) Sam Gaze	(Sweden) Alexandra Engen
27 April 2014	(Australia) Cairns	(Austria) Daniel Federspiel	(Sweden) Jenny Rissveds
27 April 2014	(Australia) Cairns	(Australia) Paul van der Ploeg	(Switzerland) Jolanda Neff
23 May 2014	(Czech Republic) Nové Město na Moravě	(Slovenia) Miha Halzer	(Sweden) Alexandra Engen
23 May 2014	(Czech Republic) Nové Město na Moravě	(Austria) Daniel Federspiel	(Switzerland) Kathrin Stirnemann
23 May 2014	(Czech Republic) Nové Město na Moravě	(Australia) Paul van der Ploeg	(Norway) Ingrid Boe Jacobsen
30 May 2014	(Germany) Albstadt	(Belgium) Fabrice Mels	(Switzerland) Kathrin Stirnemann
30 May 2014	(Germany) Albstadt	(Australia) Paul van der Ploeg	(Sweden) Alexandra Engen
30 May 2014	(Germany) Albstadt	(Switzerland) Patrick Lüthi	(Switzerland) Linda Indergand
31 July 2014	(Canada) Mont-Sainte-Anne	(Germany) Simon Gegenheimer	(Switzerland) Kathrin Stirnemann
31 July 2014	(Canada) Mont-Sainte-Anne	(Argentina) Catriel Andres	(Sweden) Jenny Rissveds
31 July 2014	(Canada) Mont-Sainte-Anne	(Belgium) Fabrice Mels	(Austria) Lisa Mitterbauer
7 August 2014	(United States) Windham	(Argentina) Catriel Andres	(Sweden) Jenny Rissveds
7 August 2014	(United States) Windham	(Germany) Simon Gegenheimer	(Switzerland) Kathrin Stirnemann
7 August 2014	(United States) Windham	(Belgium) Fabrice Mels	(Canada) Cindy Montambault
21 August 2014	(France) Méribel	(Belgium) Fabrice Mels	(Switzerland) Linda Indergand
21 August 2014	(France) Méribel	(Germany) Simon Gegenheimer	(Switzerland) Kathrin Stirnemann
21 August 2014	(France) Méribel	(France) Kevin Miquel	(Norway) Ingrid Boe Jacobsen
		Podium (Men)	Podium (Women)
Final standings	UCI World Cup; Cross Country Championship	(Belgium) Fabrice Mels	(Switzerland) Kathrin Stirnemann
Final standings	UCI World Cup; Cross Country Championship	(Germany) Simon Gegenheimer	(Sweden) Jenny Rissveds
Final standings	UCI World Cup; Cross Country Championship	(Austria) Daniel Federspiel	(Sweden) Alexandra Engen

== Downhill ==
Date	Venue	Podium (Men)	Podium (Women)
13 April 2014	(South Africa) Pietermaritzburg	(United States) Aaron Gwin	(United Kingdom) Manon Carpenter
13 April 2014	(South Africa) Pietermaritzburg	(Australia) Michael Hannah	(United Kingdom) Rachel Atherton
13 April 2014	(South Africa) Pietermaritzburg	(South Africa) Greg Minnaar	(United States) Jill Kintner
27 April 2014	(Australia) Cairns	(United Kingdom) Gee Atherton	(United Kingdom) Rachel Atherton
27 April 2014	(Australia) Cairns	(United Kingdom) Josh Bryceland	(United Kingdom) Manon Carpenter
27 April 2014	(Australia) Cairns	(United States) Neko Mulally	(France) Myriam Nicole
8 June 2014	(United Kingdom) Fort William	(Australia) Troy Brosnan	(France) Emmeline Ragot
8 June 2014	(United Kingdom) Fort William	(Australia) Samuel Hill	(France) Myriam Nicole
8 June 2014	(United Kingdom) Fort William	(United Kingdom) Danny Hart	(Australia) Tracey Hannah
15 June 2014	(Austria) Leogang	(United Kingdom) Josh Bryceland	(United Kingdom) Manon Carpenter
15 June 2014	(Austria) Leogang	(South Africa) Greg Minnaar	(United Kingdom) Rachel Atherton
15 June 2014	(Austria) Leogang	(Australia) Troy Brosnan	(France) Myriam Nicole
31 July 2014	(Canada) Mont-Sainte-Anne	(Australia) Samuel Hill	(United Kingdom) Manon Carpenter
31 July 2014	(Canada) Mont-Sainte-Anne	(United Kingdom) Josh Bryceland	(United Kingdom) Rachel Atherton
31 July 2014	(Canada) Mont-Sainte-Anne	(United Kingdom) Danny Hart	(France) Emmeline Ragot
7 August 2014	(United States) Windham	(United Kingdom) Josh Bryceland	(France) Emmeline Ragot
7 August 2014	(United States) Windham	(United States) Aaron Gwin	(United Kingdom) Rachel Atherton
7 August 2014	(United States) Windham	(Australia) Troy Brosnan	(Australia) Tracey Hannah
21 August 2014	(France) Méribel	(Australia) Samuel Hill	(United Kingdom) Rachel Atherton
21 August 2014	(France) Méribel	(United Kingdom) Matthew Simmonds	(France) Emmeline Ragot
21 August 2014	(France) Méribel	(United Kingdom) Josh Bryceland	(United Kingdom) Manon Carpenter
		Podium (Men)	Podium (Women)
Final standings	UCI World Cup; Downhill Championship	(United Kingdom) Josh Bryceland	(United Kingdom) Manon Carpenter
Final standings	UCI World Cup; Downhill Championship	(United States) Aaron Gwin	(United Kingdom) Rachel Atherton
Final standings	UCI World Cup; Downhill Championship	(Australia) Troy Brosnan	(France) Emmeline Ragot

== Classification ==
=== Men's ===
CROSS-COUNTRY – ELITE
Pos	Athletes	Points
1.	(France) Julien Absalon	1490
2.	(Switzerland) Nino Schurter	1330
3.	(Australia) Daniel McConnell	970
4.	(Germany) Manuel Fumic	856
5.	(France) Stéphane Tempier	785
6.	(Switzerland) Mathias Flückiger	785
7.	(Spain) José Antonio Hermida	767
8.	(Switzerland) Lukas Flückiger	709
9.	(Spain) Sergio Mantecon Gutierrez	683
10.	(France) Maxime Marotte	668

CROSS-COUNTRY – U23
Pos	Athletes	Points
1.	(France) Jordan Sarrou	570
2.	(Netherlands) Michiel van der Heijden	480
3.	(France) Victor Koretzky	301
4.	(United Kingdom) Grant Ferguson	214
5.	(United States) Howard Grotts	197
6.	(Spain) Pablo Rodriguez Guede	195
7.	(France) Julien Trarieux	188
8.	(New Zealand) Anton Cooper	162
9.	(New Zealand) Sam Gaze	138
10.	(United States) Keegan Swenson	122

ELIMINATOR
Pos	Athletes	Points
1.	(Belgium) Fabrice Mels	217
2.	(Germany) Simon Gegenheimer	164
3.	(Austria) Daniel Federspiel	150
4.	(Australia) Paul Van der Ploeg	150
5.	(Argentina) Catriel Andres	139
6.	(Sweden) Emil Lindgren	87
7.	(New Zealand) Sam Gaze	64
8.	(Slovenia) Miha Halzer	63
9.	(Switzerland) Marcel Wildhaber	50
10.	(France) Kevin Miquel	46

DOWNHILL
Pos	Athletes	Points
1.	(United Kingdom) Josh Bryceland	1187
2.	(United States) Aaron Gwin	1038
3.	(Australia) Troy Brosnan	1025
4.	(Australia) Samuel Hill	1024
5.	(United Kingdom) Gee Atherton	813
6.	(United Kingdom) Matthew Simmonds	745
7.	(South Africa) Greg Minnaar	742
8.	(United Kingdom) Danny Hart	718
9.	(New Zealand) Samuel Blenkinsop	703
10.	(France) Loïc Bruni	669

=== Women's ===
CROSS-COUNTRY – ELITE
Pos	Athletes	Points
1.	(Switzerland) Jolanda Neff	1300
2.	(Canada) Catharine Pendrel	940
3.	(Slovenia) Tanja Žakelj	856
4.	(Canada) Emily Batty	830
5.	(Poland) Maja Włoszczowska	788
6.	(Norway) Gunn-Rita Dahle Flesjå	760
7.	(Germany) Sabine Spitz	758
8.	(Denmark) Annika Langvad	750
9.	(Russia) Irina Kalentieva	720
10.	(France) Pauline Ferrand-Prévot	660

CROSS-COUNTRY – U23
Pos	Athletes	Points
1.	(Ukraine) Yana Belomoyna	400
2.	(Germany) Helen Grobert	394
3.	(Sweden) Jenny Rissveds	377
4.	(France) Margot Moschetti	375
5.	(Serbia) Jovana Crnogorac	259
6.	(Italy) Lisa Rabensteiner	207
7.	(France) Perrine Clauzel	175
8.	(United States) Kate Courtney	172
9.	(Switzerland) Linda Indergand	135
10.	(Austria) Lisa MitterBauer	124

ELIMINATOR
Pos	Athletes	Points
1.	(Switzerland) Kathrin Stirnemann	265
2.	(Sweden) Jenny Rissveds	185
3.	(Sweden) Alexandra Engen	160
4.	(Norway) Ingrid Boe Jacobsen	98
5.	(Switzerland) Linda Indergand	90
6.	(Austria) Lisa Mitterbauer	76
7.	(United States) Kate Courtney	64
8.	(Canada) Andreane Lanthier-Nadeau	55
9.	(Italy) Eva Lechner	52
10.	(Netherlands) Anne Terpstra	51

DOWNHILL
Pos	Athletes	Points
1.	(United Kingdom) Manon Carpenter	1360
2.	(United Kingdom) Rachel Atherton	1310
3.	(France) Emmeline Ragot	1300
4.	(Australia) Tracey Hannah	942
5.	(United Kingdom) Tahnee Seagrave	745
6.	(France) Myriam Nicole	662
7.	(United States) Jill Kintner	625
8.	(United Kingdom) Fionn Griffiths	525
9.	(France) Morgane Charre	513
10.	(Canada) Micayla Gatto	399

== See also ==
- 2014 UCI Mountain Bike & Trials World Championships
