= 2013 in cycle sport =

== BMX (supercross) biking ==
- April 19 – September 28: UCI BMX Supercross World Cup
  - April 19 & 20 at (United Kingdom) Manchester
    - Men's Elite winner: (United Kingdom) Liam Phillips
    - Women's Elite winner: (United Kingdom) Shanaze Reade
  - May 10 & 11 at (Argentina) Santiago del Estero
    - Men's Elite winner: (United States) Connor Fields
    - Women's Elite winner: (United Kingdom) Shanaze Reade
  - June 15 & 16 at (Netherlands) Papendal
    - Men's Elite winner: (Netherlands) Jelle van Gorkom
    - Women's Elite winner: (Colombia) Mariana Pajón
  - September 27 & 28 at (United States) Chula Vista
    - Men's Elite winner: (Australia) Sam Willoughby
    - Women's Elite winner: (Colombia) Mariana Pajón
- July 24–28: 2013 UCI BMX World Championships in (New Zealand) Auckland
  - Men's Elite winner: (United Kingdom) Liam Phillips
  - Women's Elite winner: (Australia) Caroline Buchanan

== Mountain biking ==
- May 18 – September 22: 2013 UCI Mountain Bike World Cup
  - May 18 & 19 at (Germany) Albstadt
    - Men's Elite winner (eliminator): (Austria) Daniel Federspiel
    - Men's Elite winner (XCO): (Australia) Daniel McConnell
    - Women's Elite winner (eliminator): (Sweden) Alexandra Engen
    - Women's Elite winner (XCO): (Italy) Eva Lechner
  - May 24 – 26 at (Czech Republic) Nové Město na Moravě
    - Men's Elite winner (eliminator): (United Kingdom) Kenta Gallagher
    - Men's Elite winner (XCO): (Switzerland) Nino Schurter
    - Women's Elite winner (eliminator): (Sweden) Jenny Rissveds
    - Women's Elite winner (XCO): (Slovenia) Tanja Žakelj
  - June 8 & 9 at (United Kingdom) Fort William, Scotland (downhill event only)
    - Men's Elite winner (downhill): (United Kingdom) Gee Atherton
    - Women's Elite winner (downhill): (United Kingdom) Rachel Atherton
  - June 13–16 at (Italy) Val di Sole
    - Men's Elite winner (eliminator): (Austria) Daniel Federspiel
    - Women's Elite winner (eliminator): (Sweden) Alexandra Engen
    - Men's Elite winner (XCO): (Switzerland) Nino Schurter
    - Women's Elite winner (XCO): (Slovenia) Tanja Žakelj
    - Men's Elite winner (downhill): (United Kingdom) Gee Atherton
    - Women's Elite winner (downhill): (United Kingdom) Rachel Atherton
  - July 25–28 at (Andorra) Vallnord
    - Men's Elite winner (eliminator): (Belgium) Fabrice Mels
    - Women's Elite winner (eliminator): (Switzerland) Kathrin Stirnemann
    - Men's Elite winner (XCO): (Switzerland) Nino Schurter
    - Women's Elite winner (XCO): (Germany) Sabine Spitz
    - Men's Elite winner (downhill): (France) Rémi Thirion
    - Women's Elite winner (downhill): (United Kingdom) Rachel Atherton
  - August 10 & 11 at (Canada) Mont-Sainte-Anne
    - Men's Elite winner (XCO): (France) Julien Absalon
    - Women's Elite winner (XCO): (Czech Republic) Kateřina Nash
    - Men's Elite winner (downhill): (Canada) Steve Smith
    - Women's Elite winner (downhill): (France) Emmeline Ragot
  - September 12–15 at (Norway) Hafjell
    - Men's Elite winner (eliminator): (Germany) Simon Gegenheimer
    - Women's Elite winner (eliminator): (Sweden) Jenny Rissveds
    - Men's Elite winner (XCO): (Czech Republic) Jaroslav Kulhavý
    - Women's Elite winner (XCO): (Russia) Irina Kalentieva
    - Men's Elite winner (downhill): (Canada) Steve Smith
    - Women's Elite winner (downhill): (United Kingdom) Rachel Atherton
  - September 21 & 22 at (Austria) Leogang (downhill event only)
    - Men's Elite winner (downhill): (Canada) Steve Smith
    - Women's Elite winner (downhill): (France) Emmeline Ragot
- June 28 & 29: 2013 UCI Mountain Bike Marathon World Championships at (Austria) Kirchberg
  - Men's Elite winner: (Switzerland) Christoph Sauser
  - Women's Elite winner: (Norway) Gunn-Rita Dahle Flesjaa
- August 26 – September 1: 2013 UCI Mountain Bike & Trials World Championships in (South Africa) Pietermaritzburg
  - Men's Elite winner (eliminator): (Australia) Paul Van der Ploeg
  - Women's Elite winner (eliminator): (Sweden) Alexandra Engen
  - Men's Elite winner (XCO): (Switzerland) Nino Schurter
  - Women's Elite winner (XCO): (France) Julie Bresset
  - Men's Elite winner (downhill): (South Africa) Greg Minnaar
  - Women's Elite Winner (downhill): (United Kingdom) Rachel Atherton
- September 21: 2013 UCI Four-Cross World Championships in (Austria) Leogang
  - Men's Elite winner: (Netherlands) Joose Wichman
  - Women's Elite winner: (Australia) Caroline Buchanan

== Road cycling ==
One Day Races.

- March 17: Milan–San Remo
  - Gerald Ciolek (GER).
- March 31: Tour of Flanders. 100th edition.
  - Fabian Cancellara (SUI). Second title.
- April 7: Paris–Roubaix.
  - Fabian Cancellara (SUI). Third title. Second Flanders and Roubaix double after 2010.
- April 21: 2013 Liège–Bastogne–Liège.
  - Dan Martin (IRL).

Grand Tours.

- May 4–26: Giro d'Italia
  - Vincenzo Nibali (ITA). (first Giro title and second Grand Tour win)
- June 29 – July 21: Tour de France. 100th edition.
  - Chris Froome (GBR). (first Tour title and first Grand Tour win)
- August 24 – September 15: Vuelta a España.
  - Chris Horner (USA) (first Vuelta title and first Grand Tour win)
    - The 41-year-old Horner becomes the oldest winner of a Grand Tour.

World Championships.

- September 21–29: 2013 UCI Road World Championships in (Italy) Tuscany
  - The Netherlands won the gold medal tally. Australia won the overall medal tally. Ellen van Dijk (NED) and Tony Martin (GER) won the most gold medals (both 2).

== Track cycling ==
- 11 October 2012 – 19 January 2013: 2012–2013 UCI Track Cycling World Cup Classics
  - Overall winning country: Germany
- 20–24 February: 2013 UCI Track Cycling World Championships in Minsk, Belarus
  - United Kingdom won both the gold and overall medals tallies.
- 7–11 August: 2013 UCI Juniors Track World Championships in (United Kingdom) Glasgow
  - Australia won both the gold and overall medal tallies.
