= 2010 UCI Mountain Bike & Trials World Championships – Women's cross-country =

Rainbow jersey

== Results – Elite ==
place	race nr	name	nat	birth	age	time
1	16	Maja Włoszczowska	Poland	09.11.1983	27	1:48:21
2	1	Irina Kalentyeva	Russia	10.11.1977	33	+00:48
3	4	Willow Koerber	United States	12.12.1977	33	+00:52
4	5	Catharine Pendrel	Canada	30.09.1980	30	+00:54
5	2	Elisabeth Osl	Austria	21.11.1985	25	+02:00
6	23	Heather Irmiger	United States	31.05.1979	31	+02:03
7	7	Anna Szafraniec	Poland	16.02.1981	30	+02:16
8	14	Sabine Spitz	Germany	27.12.1971	39	+02:32
9	20	Marie-Hélène Prémont	Canada	24.10.1977	33	+02:43
10	3	Eva Lechner	Italy	01.07.1985	25	+02:57
11	6	Nathalie Schneitter	Switzerland	19.06.1986	24	+03:43
12	19	Marielle Saner-Guinchard	Switzerland	22.03.1977	33	+04:32
13	9	Mary McConneloug	United States	24.06.1971	39	+04:50
14	8	Katrin Leumann	Switzerland	08.02.1982	29	+05:31
15	57	Cheng-Yuan Ren	China	20.09.1986	24	+06:34
16	27	Kateřina Nash	Czech Republic	09.12.1977	33	+07:00
17	39	Rosara Joseph	New Zealand	21.02.1982	29	+07:17
18	51	Gunn-Rita Dahle-Flesjå	Norway	10.02.1973	38	+07:18
19	17	Annika Langvad	Denmark	22.03.1984	26	+08:42
20	13	Cécile Ravanel	France	06.01.1981	30	+08:54
21	22	Aleksandra Dawidowicz	Poland	04.02.1987	24	+09:53
22	12	Esther Süss	Switzerland	19.03.1974	36	+10:22
23	18	Anja Gradl	Germany	06.05.1986	24	+10:29
24	31	Rie Katayama	Japan	13.09.1979	31	+10:39
25	26	Hanna Klein	Germany	16.09.1987	23	+12:04
26	65	Qing-Lan Shi	China	06.01.1986	25	+12:31
27	42	Margarita Fullana Riera	Spain	09.04.1972	38	+12:33
28	29	Amanda Sin	Canada	03.02.1977	34	+12:44
29	44	Mical Dyck	Canada	11.02.1982	29	+13:25
30	41	Nina Homovec	Slovenia	21.06.1985	25	+13:28
31	21	Anna Villar-Argente	Spain	29.06.1983	27	+13:55
32	28	Sabrina Enaux	France	01.04.1978	32	+14:08
33	30	Laura Turpijn	Netherlands	26.12.1978	32	+14:38
34	15	Janka Števková	Slovakia	04.02.1976	35	+15:14
35	24	Elisabeth Brandau	Germany	16.12.1985	25	+15:24
36	58	Ying Liu	China	23.11.1985	25	+16:10
37	69	Nataliya Krompets	Ukraine	15.02.1987	24	+16:49
38	49	Laura Lorenza Morfin Macouzet	Mexico	09.01.1982	29	+16:57
39	68	Daniela Veronesi	San Marino	13.06.1972	38	+17:18
40	59	Jean Ann McKirdy	Canada	17.04.1984	26	+18:10
41	11	Georgia Gould	United States	05.01.1980	31	+20:04
42	54	Catherine Vipond	Canada	12.01.1985	26	+20:40
43	52	Sandra Walter	Canada	27.03.1980	30	-1LAP
44	33	Rowena Fry	Australia	08.12.1982	28	-1LAP
45	53	Oksana Rybakova	Russia	15.09.1983	27	-1LAP
46	48	Heather Logie	Australia	09.11.1978	32	-1LAP
47	47	Yolande Speedy	South Africa	30.12.1976	34	-1LAP
48	56	Fiona Macdermid	New Zealand	18.04.1973	37	-1LAP
49	62	Kelli Emmett	United States	07.04.1977	33	-1LAP
50	64	Allison Mann	United States	11.11.1980	30	-2LAP
51	61	Angela Parra	Colombia	26.04.1982	28	-2LAP
52	46	Kate Potter	Australia	05.03.1978	32	-2LAP
53	50	Katherine O'Shea	Australia	22.03.1979	31	-2LAP
54	66	Jennifer Smith	New Zealand	09.03.1973	37	-2LAP
55	63	Viviana Andrea Maya-Tabares	Colombia	18.07.1984	26	-2LAP
56	37	Nicola Leary	New Zealand	19.03.1984	26	-2LAP
57	35	Tereza Huříková	Czech Republic	11.02.1987	24	-2LAP
58	40	Inbar Ronen	Israel	22.07.1973	37	-3LAP
59	60	Carla Salgado-Gonzalez	Mexico	19.11.1978	32	-3LAP
60	43	Maaris Meier	Estonia	22.02.1983	28	-4LAP
	55	Roberta Kelly Stopa	Brazil	19.01.1980	31	DNF0
	45	Rocio Gamonal-Ferrera	Spain	25.02.1979	32	DNF0
	25	Blaža Klemenčič	Slovenia	11.03.1980	30	DNF0
	38	Magdalena Sadlecka	Poland	17.03.1982	28	DNF1
	32	Sarah Koba	Switzerland	19.07.1984	26	DNF1
	34	Katie Compton	United States	03.12.1978	32	DNF1
	36	Maria Osl	Austria	24.01.1984	27	DNF2

== Results – U23 ==
place	race nr	name	nat	birth	age	time
1	3	Alexandra Engen	Sweden	05.01.1988	23	1:30:33
2	4	Annie Last	Great Britain	07.09.1990	20	+00:43
3	7	Paula Gorycka	Poland	05.11.1990	20	+03:04
4	2	Tanja Žakelj	Slovenia	15.09.1988	22	+03:31
5	6	Emily Batty	Canada	16.06.1988	22	+03:49
6	11	Fanny Bourdon	France	03.02.1989	22	+04:33
7	5	Barbara Benkó	Hungary	21.01.1990	21	+04:46
8	8	Kathrin Stirnemann	Switzerland	22.10.1989	21	+05:09
9	20	Katarzyna Solus-Miśkowicz	Poland	21.03.1988	22	+06:24
10	21	Vera Andreyeva	Russia	10.05.1988	22	+07:03
11	23	Samara Sheppard	Netherlands	25.06.1990	20	+07:48
12	13	Julie Krasniak	France	05.06.1988	22	+09:06
13	40	Zhuan-Zhuan Ye	China	29.11.1989	21	+11:28
14	15	Mikaela Kofman	Canada	11.08.1989	21	+11:28
15	25	Michelle Hediger	Switzerland	01.05.1991	19	+11:40
16	16	Serena Calvetti	Italy	14.02.1990	21	+12:35
17	14	Judith Pollinger	Italy	04.05.1988	22	+13:12
18	38	Kseniya Kirillova	Russia	17.10.1989	21	+13:56
19	9	Vivienne Meyer	Switzerland	05.04.1990	20	+14:00
20	37	Gracie Elvin	Australia	31.10.1988	22	+14:04
21	12	Lily Matthews	Great Britain	30.09.1989	21	+14:50
22	17	Noga Korem	Israel	23.08.1991	19	+15:02
23	19	Ekaterina Anoshina	Russia	26.04.1991	19	+15:33
24	22	Mona Eiberweiser	Germany	05.01.1991	20	+15:58
25	18	Elisabeth Sveum	Norway	24.01.1989	22	+17:42
26	39	Andréanne Pichette	Canada	10.04.1990	20	+18:58
27	26	Mariske Strauss	South Africa	16.05.1991	19	-1LAP
28	27	Daniela Rojas	Chile	22.04.1991	19	-1LAP
29	24	Paula Quiros	Argentina	02.12.1988	22	-1LAP
30	31	Rebecca Beaumont	Canada	12.09.1990	20	-1LAP
31	32	Lydia Tanner	United States	27.09.1989	21	-1LAP
32	28	Therese Rhodes	Australia	10.04.1988	22	-1LAP
33	36	Cassandre Olivier-Lapierre	Canada	17.06.1990	20	-1LAP
34	10	Anne Terpstra	Netherlands	05.01.1991	20	-2LAP
	35	Ashley Barson	Canada	19.08.1990	20	DNF3
	30	Sage Wilderman	United States	14.07.1988	22	DNF3

== Results – Junior ==
place	race nr	name	nat	birth	age	time
1	1	Pauline Ferrand-Prévot	France	10.02.1992	19	1:20:33
2	33	Yana Belomoyna	Ukraine	02.11.1992	18	+00:47
3	8	Helen Grobert	Germany	11.04.1992	18	+01:21
4	13	Yue Bai	China	13.12.1992	18	+01:43
5	12	Elise Marchal	Belgium	26.05.1992	18	+02:42
6	26	Karolína Kalašová	Czech Republic	30.01.1992	19	+05:18
7	25	Lisa Mitterbauer	Austria	13.09.1992	18	+06:02
8	3	Cecile Delaire	France	24.11.1993	17	+07:25
9	7	Johanna Techt	Germany	04.02.1993	18	+07:34
10	20	Andreane Lanthier-Nadeau	Canada	03.07.1993	17	+07:39
11	15	Lauren Rosser	Canada	04.10.1993	17	+07:39
12	31	Ingrid Sofie Jacobsen	Norway	06.01.1992	19	+09:45
13	11	Barton Essence	United States	24.03.1992	18	+12:13
14	6	Candice Neethling	South Africa	15.02.1992	19	+14:12
15	32	Marta Tereshchuk	Ukraine	08.03.1992	18	+15:15
16	14	Kristina Laforge	Canada	28.02.1992	19	+17:24
17	22	Oksana Zamyatina	Russia	29.03.1992	18	+18:21
18	16	Valerie Meunier	Canada	01.09.1992	18	+18:32
19	9	Alicia Rose Pastore	United States	24.03.1993	17	+19:50
20	19	Cayley Brooks	Canada	04.02.1992	19	+21:01
21	24	Florencia Espineira	Chile	09.10.1992	18	+21:23
22	30	Torunn Stake Længen	Norway	02.06.1992	18	+22:33
23	27	Manami Iwade	Japan	24.12.1993	17	-1LAP
24	29	Natália Šimorová	Slovakia	13.03.1992	18	-1LAP
25	28	Verena Brunner	Argentina	06.09.1992	18	-1LAP
26	10	Sofia Hamilton	United States	10.01.1993	18	-2LAP
	5	Vania Schumacher	Switzerland	26.09.1992	18	DNF1
	17	Laura Bietola	Canada	02.04.1992	18	DNF1
	18	Emily Fisher	Canada	19.01.1993	18	DNF1
	21	Alexa Peters	New Zealand	28.12.1992	18	DNF1
	4	Jolanda Neff	Switzerland	05.01.1993	18	DNF2
	2	Julie Berteaux	France	25.05.1992	18	DNF2

== See also ==
- UCI Mountain Bike & Trials World Championships
