= 2014 UCI Mountain Bike & Trials World Championships – Women's cross-country eliminator =

== Results ==
#	Cyclist	Nation
1	Kathrin Stirnemann	Switzerland
2	Linda Indergand	Switzerland
3	Ingrid Bøe Jacobsen	Norway
4	Jenny Rissveds	Sweden
5	Ramona Forchini	Switzerland
6	Anna Oberparleiter	Italy
7	Elisabeth Sveum	Norway
8	Kajsa Snihs	Sweden
9	Lisa Mitterbauer	Austria
10	Anne Terpstra	Netherlands
11	Greta Seiwald	Italy
12	Barbara Benkó	Hungary
13	Lucie Vesela	Czech Republic
14	Rachel Pageau	Canada
15	Kaylee Blevins	United States
16	Lena Putz	Germany
17	Emily Parkes	Australia
18	Holly Harris	Australia
19	Peta Mullens	Australia
20	Kate Courtney	United States
21	Shayna Powless	United States
22	Maaris Meier	Estonia
23	Evelyn Dong	United States
24	Ellie Wale	Australia
25	Eri Yonamine	Japan
