= 2010 UCI Mountain Bike & Trials World Championships – Men's downhill =

Rainbow jersey

== Results - Elite ==
rank	race nr	name	nat	birth	age	speed		split 1		split 2		finish	gap
1	10	Sam Hill	Australia	21.07.1985	25	61.578	(24)	3:08.21	(1)	3:59.42	(1)	4:37.93	
2	14	Steve Smith	Canada	25.11.1989	21	63.570	(3)	3:09.82	(2)	4:01.01	(2)	4:40.56	2.63
3	3	Greg Minnaar	South Africa	13.11.1981	29	64.151	(2)	3:10.42	(3)	4:02.32	(3)	4:40.93	3.00
4	5	Aaron Gwin	United States	24.12.1987	23	62.241	(17)	3:11.48	(5)	4:02.80	(4)	4:42.01	4.08
5	2	Gee Atherton	Great Britain	26.02.1985	26	58.991	(52)	3:12.24	(7)	4:03.06	(5)	4:42.64	4.71
6	8	Marc Beaumont	Great Britain	25.09.1984	26	62.758	(9)	3:14.45	(12)	4:06.43	(8)	4:45.52	7.59
7	1	Steve Peat	Great Britain	17.06.1974	36	64.488	(1)	3:14.15	(10)	4:06.18	(7)	4:45.54	7.61
8	19	Danny Hart	Great Britain	20.09.1991	19	62.163	(19)	3:13.72	(8)	4:05.71	(6)	4:45.80	7.87
9	4	Samuel Blenkinsop	New Zealand	28.10.1988	22	62.638	(11)	3:15.03	(13)	4:06.77	(9)	4:46.26	8.33
10	11	Damien Spagnolo	France	28.04.1985	25	61.928	(22)	3:14.14	(9)	4:07.23	(10)	4:47.61	9.68
11	36	Andrew Neethling	South Africa	05.08.1984	26	62.598	(12)	3:14.23	(11)	4:08.08	(13)	4:47.94	10.01
12	40	Brook Macdonald	New Zealand	25.11.1991	19	62.919	(4)	3:11.80	(6)	4:09.26	(15)	4:48.16	10.23
13	51	Marcel Beer	Switzerland	27.12.1985	25	60.554	(41)	3:15.70	(19)	4:07.97	(11)	4:48.64	10.71
14	12	Justin Leov	New Zealand	20.10.1984	26	62.798	(8)	3:10.97	(4)	4:09.91	(17)	4:49.80	11.87
15	22	Romain Paulhan	France	16.04.1988	22	60.967	(36)	3:16.50	(22)	4:10.04	(18)	4:49.83	11.90
16	31	Luke Strobel	United States	24.06.1986	24	61.540	(26)	3:18.00	(29)	4:11.29	(20)	4:50.98	13.05
17	32	Joseph Smith	Great Britain	04.07.1990	20	62.202	(18)	3:17.42	(25)	4:11.85	(22)	4:51.87	13.94
18	44	Ben Reid	Ireland	24.03.1986	24	61.463	(30)	3:18.71	(31)	4:11.28	(19)	4:52.35	14.42
19	48	Ruaridh Cunningham	Great Britain	15.02.1989	22	59.312	(50)	3:17.39	(24)	4:12.09	(23)	4:52.72	14.79
20	38	Julien Camellini	France	07.01.1984	27	61.540	(26)	3:15.95	(20)	4:11.52	(21)	4:52.80	14.87
21	37	Lorenzo Suding	Italy	15.03.1986	24	62.399	(15)	3:19.36	(34)	4:13.89	(25)	4:53.91	15.98
22	24	Fabien Pedemanaud	France	12.06.1984	26	62.678	(10)	3:15.06	(14)	4:08.21	(14)	4:54.06	16.13
23	28	Filip Polc	Slovakia	10.04.1982	28	62.919	(4)	3:19.23	(33)	4:14.09	(27)	4:54.28	16.35
24	39	Markolf Berchtold	Brazil	09.02.1980	31	61.578	(24)	3:17.88	(27)	4:13.18	(24)	4:54.30	16.37
25	25	Bernat Guardia-Pascual	Spain	30.09.1982	28	62.879	(6)	3:17.20	(23)	4:14.40	(28)	4:54.95	17.02
26	50	Marco Milivinti	Italy	02.12.1985	25	58.326	(58)	3:17.91	(28)	4:14.41	(29)	4:55.10	17.17
27	15	Chris Kovarik	Australia	01.03.1978	33	60.704	(39)	3:17.56	(26)	4:15.18	(31)	4:55.65	17.72
28	7	Brendan Fairclough	Great Britain	10.01.1988	23	62.838	(7)	3:22.22	(40)	4:16.69	(35)	4:56.70	18.77
29	52	Duncan Riffle	United States	29.10.1986	24	61.233	(33)	3:18.60	(30)	4:15.02	(30)	4:57.03	19.10
30	42	Matěj Charvát	Czech Republic	26.11.1985	25	62.006	(21)	3:18.90	(32)	4:15.42	(32)	4:57.07	19.14
31	30	Marcelo Gutierrez-Villegas	Colombia	09.05.1990	20	62.439	(14)	3:21.00	(37)	4:16.57	(34)	4:57.27	19.34
32	18	Markus Pekoll	Austria	13.10.1987	23	61.501	(29)	3:20.20	(36)	4:14.01	(26)	4:57.95	20.02
33	47	Pasqual Canals-Flix	Spain	15.09.1984	26	60.854	(38)	3:21.07	(38)	4:16.38	(33)	4:58.16	20.23
34	66	Thomas Vanderham	Canada	30.04.1984	26	60.294	(43)	3:21.20	(39)	4:17.12	(36)	4:58.43	20.50
35	21	Wyn Masters	New Zealand	18.04.1987	23	59.672	(48)	3:22.62	(42)	4:17.46	(37)	4:58.59	20.66
36	61	Boris Tetzlaff	Austria	21.01.1990	21	58.604	(57)	3:23.53	(44)	4:18.45	(38)	4:59.96	22.03
37	9	Nick Beer	Switzerland	17.09.1987	23	60.591	(40)	3:15.16	(15)	4:09.43	(16)	5:01.41	23.48
38	63	Bradley Benedict	United States	25.05.1986	24	60.368	(42)	3:25.55	(49)	4:20.62	(40)	5:02.70	24.77
39	58	Rob Fraser	Canada	12.09.1990	20	61.195	(34)	3:24.79	(46)	4:21.05	(41)	5:02.93	25.00
40	43	Nejc Rutar	Slovenia	27.04.1989	21	61.772	(23)	3:25.10	(48)	4:20.41	(39)	5:03.16	25.23
41	54	Dennis Dertell	Sweden	08.01.1990	21	61.540	(26)	3:25.72	(50)	4:22.90	(42)	5:04.78	26.85
42	57	Logan Binggeli	United States	27.08.1989	21	59.240	(51)	3:26.86	(51)	4:23.80	(43)	5:05.64	27.71
43	62	Walace Henrique-Miranda	Brazil	27.03.1985	25	62.045	(20)	3:27.01	(52)	4:24.92	(45)	5:06.78	28.85
44	59	Andrew Mitchell	Canada	13.08.1987	23	58.709	(56)	3:28.02	(53)	4:25.20	(46)	5:07.05	29.12
45	64	Tyler Immer	United States	16.09.1990	20	60.294	(43)	3:28.06	(54)	4:25.70	(47)	5:07.88	29.95
46	67	Ryan Vanderham	Canada	19.03.1990	20	58.326	(58)	3:19.80	(35)	4:24.38	(44)	5:08.38	30.45
47	69	Ivan Oulego-Moreno	Spain	04.06.1976	34	58.956	(54)	3:22.48	(41)	4:26.13	(48)	5:08.96	31.03
48	26	Matthew Simmonds	Great Britain	20.05.1987	23	61.119	(35)	3:16.17	(21)	4:27.70	(53)	5:09.24	31.31
49	41	Antonio Ferreiro-Pajuelo	Spain	03.01.1990	21	58.885	(55)	3:29.12	(57)	4:26.79	(50)	5:10.15	32.22
50	65	Takuya Aoki	Japan	18.03.1985	25	59.563	(49)	3:28.06	(54)	4:27.25	(52)	5:10.57	32.64
51	70	Camilo Andres Sanchez-Paez	Colombia	04.10.1987	23	60.257	(45)	3:30.53	(58)	4:29.72	(54)	5:12.88	34.95
52	49	Kieran Bennett	New Zealand	02.12.1987	23	60.892	(37)	3:22.91	(43)	4:26.17	(49)	5:14.03	36.10
53	20	Shaun O'Connor	Australia	13.07.1991	19	60.036	(46)	3:36.78	(60)	4:33.62	(55)	5:16.91	38.98
54	76	Hans Lambert	Canada	26.03.1989	21	62.519	(13)	3:15.18	(16)	4:27.12	(51)	5:17.50	39.57
55	60	Enrique Genova	Chile	09.09.1987	23	61.271	(31)	3:28.85	(56)	4:34.43	(56)	5:20.00	42.07
56	56	Dean Tennant	Canada	28.09.1988	22	58.991	(52)	3:23.57	(45)	4:38.96	(57)	5:20.03	42.10
57	45	Kyle Strait	United States	04.04.1987	23	62.360	(16)	3:25.06	(47)	4:42.99	(58)	5:26.61	48.68
58	71	Mario Sieder	Austria	08.09.1987	23	49.189	(61)	3:35.09	(59)	4:43.23	(59)	5:36.79	58.86
59	77	Mihai Moga	Romania	30.11.1976	34	56.973	(60)	3:48.70	(61)	4:56.13	(60)	5:43.03	1:05.10
60	23	Robin Wallner	Sweden	04.07.1988	22	61.271	(31)	3:15.50	(18)	6:17.85	(61)	7:08.50	2:30.57
61	29	Mitchell Delfs	Australia	25.07.1989	21	59.744	(47)	3:15.20	(17)	4:07.97	(11)	8:41.89	4:03.96
	27	Bryn Atkinson	Australia	09.12.1982	28							DNS	

== Results - Juniors ==
rank	race nr	name	nat	birth	age	speed		split 1		split 2		finish	gap
1	5	Troy Brosnan	Australia	13.07.1993	17	61.271	(1)	3:16.82	(2)	4:09.82	(1)	4:50.71	
2	17	Neko Mulally	United States	19.02.1993	18	60.257	(7)	3:16.27	(1)	4:10.01	(2)	4:50.77	0.06
3	3	Lewis Buchanan	Great Britain	27.09.1993	17	60.294	(6)	3:24.06	(5)	4:19.16	(3)	4:59.76	9.05
4	9	George Brannigan	New Zealand	09.04.1992	18	60.666	(4)	3:17.46	(3)	4:22.20	(4)	5:03.08	12.37
5	35	Oliwer Kangas	Sweden	13.11.1992	18	58.153	(21)	3:26.81	(6)	4:23.51	(5)	5:05.61	14.90
6	54	Zakarias Blom Johansen	Norway	25.11.1992	18	56.515	(35)	3:29.84	(10)	4:25.99	(6)	5:08.93	18.22
7	29	Ludovic Oget	France	12.11.1993	17	59.347	(10)	3:30.91	(14)	4:27.16	(8)	5:09.84	19.13
8	41	Timothy Bentley	South Africa	23.07.1992	18	60.929	(2)	3:23.02	(4)	4:26.86	(7)	5:10.83	20.12
9	37	Petr Třešňák	Czech Republic	29.05.1992	18	58.119	(22)	3:29.93	(12)	4:28.05	(9)	5:11.05	20.34
10	11	Rupert Chapman	New Zealand	09.04.1992	18	58.465	(16)	3:29.74	(9)	4:30.42	(13)	5:12.01	21.30
10	51	Manuel Gruber	Austria	27.11.1992	18	58.744	(14)	3:30.98	(15)	4:28.99	(12)	5:12.01	21.30
12	10	Jed Rooney	New Zealand	14.04.1992	18	57.811	(26)	3:27.68	(7)	4:28.84	(11)	5:12.06	21.35
13	46	Marius Paccolat	Switzerland	28.10.1992	18	57.473	(30)	3:30.76	(13)	4:28.24	(10)	5:12.13	21.42
14	13	Daniel Franks	New Zealand	02.10.1993	17	58.326	(19)	3:29.85	(11)	4:30.82	(14)	5:13.58	22.87
15	45	Freddy Hunziker	Switzerland	23.06.1993	17	59.240	(11)	3:33.57	(23)	4:30.96	(15)	5:13.73	23.02
16	26	Tyler Allison	Canada	01.04.1992	18	57.948	(24)	3:31.66	(18)	4:31.54	(16)	5:14.94	24.23
17	48	Carlos Castro	Portugal	26.09.1993	17	59.635	(8)	3:33.65	(24)	4:32.81	(17)	5:15.31	24.60
18	47	Miikka Lehtinen	Finland	04.10.1992	18	60.816	(3)	3:33.70	(25)	4:33.38	(18)	5:16.24	25.53
19	23	Nick Geddes	Canada	19.05.1993	17	57.676	(27)	3:31.58	(17)	4:33.84	(20)	5:16.40	25.69
20	28	Chayse Marshall	Canada	04.03.1992	19	58.395	(18)	3:35.09	(27)	4:33.47	(19)	5:17.20	26.49
21	6	Antony Moore	Australia	05.12.1992	18	57.040	(33)	3:34.74	(26)	4:34.28	(21)	5:17.51	26.80
22	20	Evan Powell	United States	18.03.1992	18	58.085	(23)	3:35.69	(28)	4:34.60	(22)	5:17.80	27.09
23	57	Daniel Lavis	Australia	05.03.1992	19	54.966	(42)	3:37.40	(32)	4:35.82	(24)	5:19.66	28.95
24	12	Sam Baker	New Zealand	19.02.1992	19	55.809	(39)	3:27.80	(8)	4:36.67	(25)	5:20.45	29.74
25	4	Sam Flockhart	Great Britain	17.02.1993	18	57.073	(32)	3:36.49	(30)	4:35.47	(23)	5:20.66	29.95
26	38	Blaž Hölcl	Slovenia	07.01.1992	19	56.224	(36)	3:31.94	(19)	4:38.45	(27)	5:20.93	30.22
27	22	Remi Gauvin	Canada	16.06.1992	18	60.442	(5)	3:32.62	(22)	4:38.96	(28)	5:22.55	31.84
28	55	Isak Leivsson	Norway	17.10.1993	17	57.507	(29)	3:38.83	(34)	4:39.24	(29)	5:23.43	32.72
29	53	Gustavo Cisneros	Argentina	02.10.1993	17	54.966	(42)	3:39.68	(38)	4:38.01	(26)	5:23.77	33.06
30	19	Nate Furbee	United States	24.05.1993	17	58.188	(20)	3:35.93	(29)	4:41.16	(31)	5:24.57	33.86
31	21	Trevor Trinkino	United States	04.06.1993	17	58.465	(16)	3:40.49	(39)	4:40.97	(30)	5:26.71	36.00
32	49	Felipe Escobar	Colombia	03.08.1993	17	57.676	(27)	3:37.13	(31)	4:41.34	(32)	5:27.60	36.89
33	27	Riley Suhan	Canada	11.09.1993	17	57.948	(24)	3:32.30	(21)	4:44.06	(34)	5:27.90	37.19
34	44	Philipp Bünnemann	Germany	20.07.1993	17	58.499	(15)	3:44.13	(42)	4:43.82	(33)	5:28.45	37.74
35	40	Kazuki Shimizu	Japan	26.04.1992	18	59.027	(12)	3:39.45	(35)	4:46.43	(35)	5:30.41	39.70
36	7	Phillip Piazza	Australia	29.01.1993	18	57.106	(31)	3:46.31	(43)	4:46.76	(37)	5:30.47	39.76
37	39	Hajime Imoto	Japan	07.06.1992	18	58.920	(13)	3:31.08	(16)	4:46.56	(36)	5:30.99	40.28
38	25	Nick Grimm	Canada	21.07.1992	18	56.063	(37)	3:39.46	(36)	4:52.22	(41)	5:33.74	43.03
39	43	Fabian Fader	Germany	24.04.1992	18	59.527	(9)	3:47.45	(44)	4:51.55	(39)	5:36.82	46.11
40	50	Juan Manuel Orrego-Castano	Colombia	02.10.1993	17	55.494	(41)	3:38.80	(33)	4:51.78	(40)	5:38.67	47.96
41	52	Gabriel Giovaninni	Brazil	09.09.1992	18	55.904	(38)	3:43.11	(41)	4:51.39	(38)	5:39.12	48.41
42	15	Sam Powers	United States	31.08.1992	18	56.678	(34)	3:32.26	(20)	4:56.94	(42)	5:46.10	55.39
43	14	Jimmy Wilson	New Zealand	29.06.1992	18	54.358	(45)	3:47.45	(44)	5:13.41	(43)	5:58.74	1:08.03
44	36	Marek Petelík	Czech Republic	16.01.1993	18	41.573	(46)	4:54.74	(46)	7:06.70	(45)	8:01.32	3:10.61
45	18	Mitch Ropelato	United States	03.03.1992	19	55.745	(40)	3:42.15	(40)	5:20.15	(44)	9:27.61	4:36.90
	24	Kyle Sangers	Canada	12.04.1993	17	54.660	(44)	3:39.57	(37)			DNF	
	16	Martin Bryson	United States	12.03.1992	18							DNF	
	42	Simon Dinkelman	South Africa	25.05.1992	18							DNS	

== See also ==
- UCI Mountain Bike & Trials World Championships
