= UCI Urban Cycling World Championships – Men's cross-country eliminator =

The men's cross-country eliminator (XCE) is an event at the annual UCI Urban Cycling World Championships. From 2012 to 2016 the UCI world championships in the XCE were held as part of the UCI Mountain Bike & Trials World Championships.

== Medalists ==
Championships	Gold	Silver	Bronze
2012 Leogang-Saalfelden	Ralph Näf; Switzerland	Miha Halzer; Slovenia	Daniel Federspiel; Austria
2013 Pietermaritzburg	Paul van der Ploeg; Australia	Daniel Federspiel; Austria	Catriel Soto; Argentina
2014 Lillehammer/Hafjell	Fabrice Mels; Belgium	Emil Lindgren; Sweden	Kevin Miquel; France
2015 Vallnord	Daniel Federspiel; Austria	Sam Gaze; New Zealand	Simon Gegenheimer; Germany
2016 Nové Město	Daniel Federspiel; Austria	Simon Gegenheimer; Germany	Fabrice Mels; Belgium
2017 Chengdu	Titouan Perrin-Ganier; France	Simon Gegenheimer; Germany	Lorenzo Serres; France
2018 Chengdu	Titouan Perrin-Ganier; France	Hugo Briatta; France	Lorenzo Serres; France
2019 Waregem	Titouan Perrin-Ganier; France	Hugo Briatta; France	Joel Burman; Sweden
2020 Leuven	Titouan Perrin-Ganier; France	Simon Gegenheimer; Germany	Anton Olstam; Sweden
2021 Graz	Simon Gegenheimer; Germany	Jeroen van Eck; Netherlands	Anton Olstam; Sweden
2022 Barcelona	Titouan Perrin-Ganier; France	Simon Gegenheimer; Germany	Ricky Morales; Puerto Rico
2023 Palangkaraya	Titouan Perrin-Ganier; France	Lorenzo Serres; France	Sondre Rokke; Norway
2024 Aalen	Jeroen van Eck; Netherlands	Jakob Klemenčič; Slovenia	Simon Gegenheimer; Germany
2025 Sakarya	Edvin Lindh; Sweden	Theo Hauser; Austria	Matic Kranjec Žagar; Slovenia
2026 Barcelona	Titouan Perrin-Ganier; France	Casper Casserstedt; Sweden	Ricardo Marinheiro; Portugal

=== Medals by country ===
Rank	Nation	Gold	Silver	Bronze	Total
1	France	7	3	3	13
2	Austria	2	2	1	5
3	Germany	1	4	2	7
4	Sweden	1	2	3	6
5	Netherlands	1	1	0	2
6	Belgium	1	0	1	2
7	Australia	1	0	0	1
7	Switzerland	1	0	0	1
9	Slovenia	0	2	1	3
10	New Zealand	0	1	0	1
11	Argentina	0	0	1	1
11	Norway	0	0	1	1
11	Portugal	0	0	1	1
11	Puerto Rico	0	0	1	1
Totals (14 entries)		15	15	15	45
