= 2012 UCI Mountain Bike & Trials World Championships – Women's cross-country eliminator =

The women's cross-country eliminator in the 2012 UCI Mountain Bike & Trials World Championships was held on 9 September 2012. Alexandra Engen of Sweden won the event before Jolanda Neff of Switzerland and Aeksandra Dawidowicz of Poland.

== Round of 32 ==
=== Heat 1 ===
Rank	Seed	Athlete	Country	Note
1	1	Alexandra Engen	Sweden	Q
2	17	Cécile Ravanel	France	Q
3	16	Katrin Leumann	Switzerland	
4	32	Noelia Rodriguez	Argentina	

=== Heat 2 ===
Rank	Seed	Athlete	Country	Note
1	8	Anneke Beerten	Netherlands	Q
2	9	Linda Indergand	Switzerland	Q
3	25	Ana Zupan	Slovenia	
4	24	Georgia Gould	United States	

=== Heat 3 ===
Rank	Seed	Athlete	Country	Note
1	4	Jolanda Neff	Switzerland	Q
2	13	Laura Turpijn	Netherlands	Q
3	20	Kajsa Snihs	Sweden	
4	29	Heidi Rosasen Sandsto	Norway	

=== Heat 4 ===
Rank	Seed	Athlete	Country	Note
1	5	Eva Lechner	Italy	Q
2	12	Anne Terpstra	Netherlands	Q
3	28	Barbara Benkó	Hungary	
4	21	Mary McConneloug	United States	

=== Heat 5 ===
Rank	Seed	Athlete	Country	Note
1	15	Elisabeth Brandau	Germany	Q
2	31	Michelle Hediger	Switzerland	Q
3	18	Maaris Meier	Estonia	
4	2	Jenny Rissveds	Sweden	DNF

=== Heat 6 ===
Rank	Seed	Athlete	Country	Note
1	10	Anna Oberparleiter	Italy	Q
2	7	Aleksandra Dawidowicz	Poland	Q
3	26	Rosara Joseph	New Zealand	
4	23	Alessia Bulleri	Italy	

=== Heat 7 ===
Rank	Seed	Athlete	Country	Note
1	3	Lea Davison	United States	Q
2	19	Serena Calvetii	Italy	Q
3	30	Rowena Fry (cyclist)	Australia	
4	14	Andrea Waldis	Switzerland	

=== Heat 8 ===
Rank	Seed	Athlete	Country	Note
1	6	Ramona Forchini	Switzerland	Q
2	11	Kathrina Stirnemann	Switzerland	Q
3	22	Ingrid Sofie Jacobsen	Norway	
4	27	Pavla Havliková	Czech Republic	

== Quarterfinals ==
=== Quarterfinal 1 ===
Rank	Seed	Athlete	Country	Note
1	1	Alexandra Engen	Sweden	Q
2	17	Cécile Ravanel	France	Q
3	9	Linda Indergand	Switzerland	
4	8	Anneke Beerten	Netherlands	

=== Quarterfinal 2 ===
Rank	Seed	Athlete	Country	Note
1	5	Eva Lechner	Italy	Q
2	4	Jolanda Neff	Switzerland	Q
3	13	Laura Turpijn	Netherlands	
4	12	Anne Terpstra	Netherlands	

=== Quarterfinal 3 ===
Rank	Seed	Athlete	Country	Note
1	10	Anna Oberparleiter	Italy	Q
2	7	Aleksandra Dawidowicz	Poland	Q
3	15	Elisabeth Brandau	Germany	
4	31	Michelle Hediger	Switzerland	

=== Quarterfinal 4 ===
Rank	Seed	Athlete	Country	Note
1	11	Kathrina Stirnemann	Switzerland	Q
2	6	Ramona Forchini	Switzerland	Q
2	3	Lea Davison	United States	
4	19	Serena Calvetii	Italy	

== Semifinals ==
=== Semifinal 1 ===
Rank	Seed	Athlete	Country	Note
1	1	Alexandra Engen	Sweden	Big Final
2	4	Jolanda Neff	Switzerland	Big Final
3	5	Eva Lechner	Italy	Small Final
4	17	Cécile Ravanel	France	Small Final

=== Semifinal 2 ===
Rank	Seed	Athlete	Country	Note
1	7	Aleksandra Dawidowicz	Poland	Big Final
2	6	Ramona Forchini	Switzerland	Big Final
3	10	Anna Oberparleiter	Italy	Small Final
4	11	Kathrina Stirnemann	Switzerland	Small Final

== Finals ==
=== Big Final ===
Rank	Seed	Athlete	Country	Note
1st place, gold medalist(s)	1	Alexandra Engen	Sweden	
2nd place, silver medalist(s)	4	Jolanda Neff	Switzerland	
3rd place, bronze medalist(s)	7	Aleksandra Dawidowicz	Poland	
4	6	Ramona Forchini	Switzerland	

=== Small Final ===
Rank	Seed	Athlete	Country	Note
1	11	Kathrina Stirnemann	Switzerland	
2	5	Eva Lechner	Italy	
3	17	Cécile Ravanel	France	
4	10	Anna Oberparleiter	Italy	
