= 2014 UCI Mountain Bike & Trials World Championships – Women's under-23 cross-country =

== Results ==
#	Cyclist	Nation		Time
1	Jolanda Neff	Switzerland	en	1 h 17 min 49 s
2	Margot Moschetti	France		1 h 19 min 36 s
3	Linda Indergand	Switzerland		1 h 19 min 42 s
4	Yana Belomoyna	Ukraine		1 h 20 min 57 s
5	Jovana Crnogorac	Serbia		1 h 21 min 14 s
6	Helen Grobert	Germany		1 h 21 min 36 s
7	Alice Barnes	United Kingdom		1 h 22 min 39 s
8	Pauline Ferrand-Prévot	France		1 h 23 min 25 s
9	Ramona Forchini	Switzerland		1 h 23 min 29 s
10	Lisa Mitterbauer	Austria		1 h 23 min 37 s
11	Lena Putz	Germany		1 h 24 min 13 s
12	Andrea Waldis	Switzerland		1 h 24 min 39 s
13	Kate Courtney	United States		1 h 25 min 13 s
14	Perrine Clauzel	France		1 h 26 min 10 s
15	Kristina Kirillova	Russia		1 h 26 min 25 s
16	Yang Ling	China		1 h 26 min 41 s
17	Bethany Crumpton	United Kingdom		1 h 26 min 54 s
18	Nadezhda Antonova	Russia		1 h 27 min 00 s
19	Shayna Powless	United States		1 h 27 min 09 s
20	Monika Zur	Poland		1 h 27 min 21 s
21	Barbora Machulkova	Czech Republic		1 h 27 min 34 s
22	Lisa Rabensteiner	Italy		1 h 28 min 14 s
23	Haley Smith	Canada		1 h 28 min 31 s
24	Maghalie Rochette	Canada		1 h 28 min 40 s
25	Annemarie Worst	Netherlands		1 h 29 min 28 s
26	Olga Terentyeva	Russia		1 h 29 min 52 s
27	Emily Parkes	Australia		1 h 29 min 57 s
28	Catherine Fleury	Canada		1 h 30 min 34 s
29	Serena Tasca	Italy		1 h 31 min 15 s
30	Rachel Pageau	Canada		1 h 31 min 21 s
31	Britt Van Den Boogert	Netherlands		1 h 31 min 33 s
32	Candice Neethling	South Africa		1 h 32 min 57 s
33	Ingrid Boe Jacobsen	Norway		
34	Anna Konovalova	Russia		
35	Michela Molina	Ecuador		
36	Joana Oliveira Monteiro	Portugal		
37	Kaylee Blevins	United States		
38	Frederique Trudel	Canada		
39	Andrea Fuentes	Mexico		
40	Meghan Beltzer	Israel		
41	Holly Harris	Australia		
42	Henriette Elvrum Handal	Norway		
43	Seika Ainota	Japan		
44	Diana Espinoza	Ecuador		
45	Sylvi Sommer	Norway		
46	Catalia Paz Fuentes Correa	Chile		
47	Ines Gutierrez	Argentina		
