= Miha Halzer =

Slovenian cyclist (1985–2023)

Personal information
- Born: 13 April 1985 SR Slovenia, SFR Yugoslavia
- Died: 9 August 2023 (aged 38)

Cycling career
- Sport: Cycling
- Discipline: Cross-country eliminator
- Role: Rider
Medal record
Representing Slovenia
Men's mountain bike racing
World Championships
Silver medal – second place	2012 Leogang-Saalfelden	Cross-country eliminator
European Championships
Silver medal – second place	2013 Bern	Cross-country eliminator

Miha Halzer (13 April 1985 – 9 August 2023) was a Slovenian cyclist who specialized in mountain biking, specifically cross-country eliminator.

== Awards ==
- Silver Medal at the 2012 UCI Mountain Bike World Championships in men's cross-country eliminator
- Silver Medal at the 2013 European Mountain Bike and Trials Championships in men's cross-country eliminator
- 3rd place at the 2014 Slovenian Mountain Bike Championships in men's cross country eliminator
- 4th place at the 2014 UCI Mountain Bike World Cup in men's cross-country eliminator
- 8th place at the 2015 UCI Mountain Bike World Cup in men's cross-country eliminator
