= Ramona Forchini =

Swiss cyclist (born 1994)

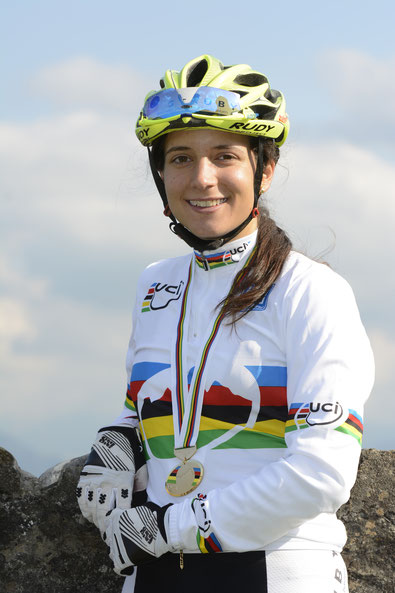
- Forchini in 2017

Personal information
- Born: 14 June 1994 (age 32)

Cycling career
- Sport: Cycling
- Current team: JB Brunex Superior Factory Racing
- Disciplines: Mountain biking; Road
- Role: Rider

Professional teams
- 2011–2017: MK–Zentralschweiz
- 2018–: JB Brunex Felt Factory Team

Ramona Forchini (born 14 June 1994) is a Swiss racing cyclist. She rode in the women's road race event at the 2017 UCI Road World Championships. She was on the start list for the cross-country at the 2018 European Mountain Bike Championships, and finished in ninth place.

== Major results ==
2012
4th Cross-country eliminator, UCI Mountain Bike & Trials World Championships
5th Time trial, UCI Junior Road World Championships
2013
3rd Cross-country eliminator, European Mountain Bike Championships
2014
3rd Time trial, UEC European Road Championships
UCI Mountain Bike & Trials World Championships

5th Cross-country eliminator
9th Under-23 cross-country

2015
1st Under-23 cross-country, UCI Mountain Bike & Trials World Championships
2nd Time trial, National Road Championships
2016
3rd Cross-country eliminator, UCI Mountain Bike & Trials World Championships
6th Overall Under-23 cross-country, UCI Mountain Bike World Cup
2018
2nd Cross-country, National Mountain Bike Championships
2019
1st Team relay, European Mountain Bike Championships
3rd Cross-country, National Mountain Bike Championships
2020
1st Women's race, UCI Mountain Bike Marathon World Championships
2021
3rd Cross-country marathon, UEC European Mountain Bike Championships
2022
3rd Cross-country, UCI Mountain Bike World Cup, Vallnord
