= Titouan Perrin-Ganier =

French cyclist

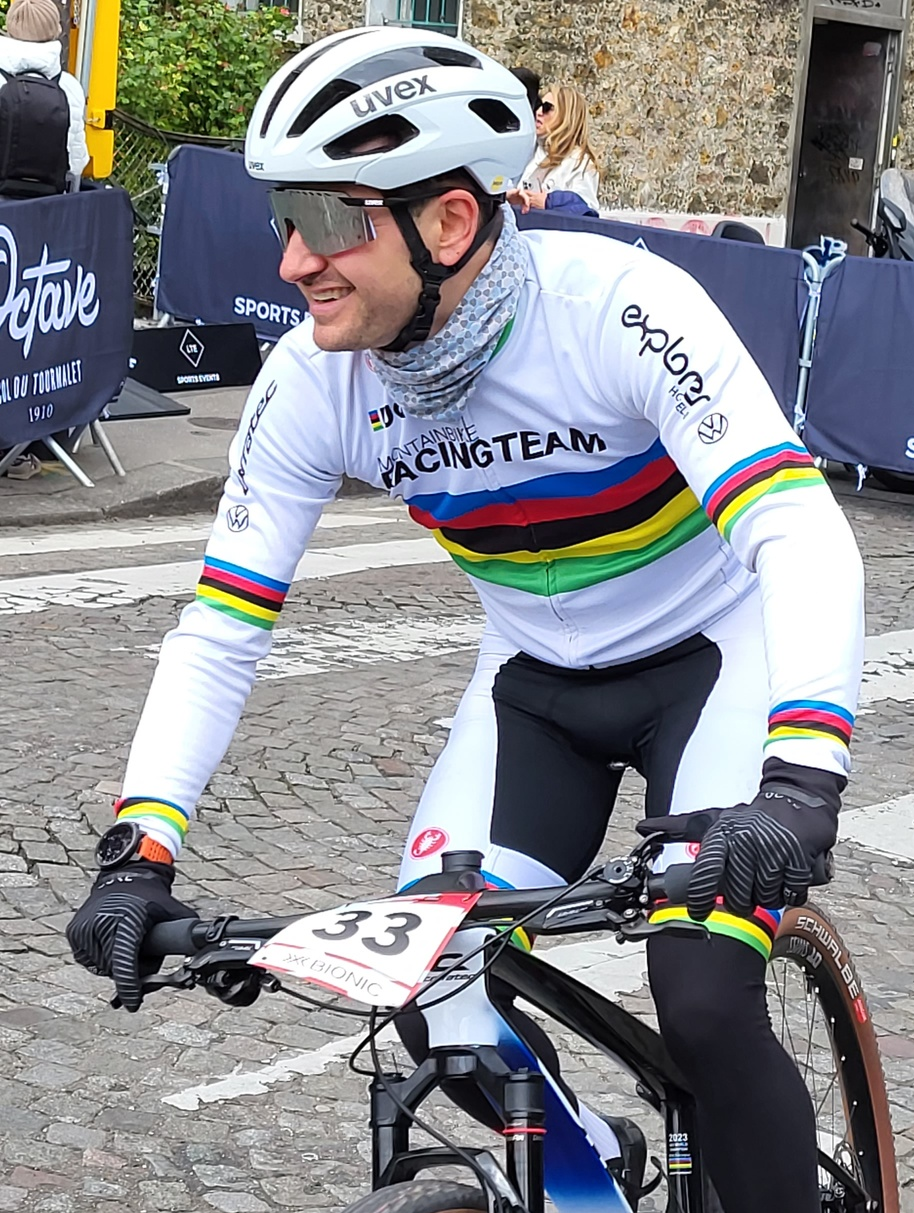
- Perrin-Ganier in 2024

Personal information
- Full name: Titouan Perrin-Ganier
- Born: 28 June 1991 (age 35) La Bresse, France

Cycling career
- Sport: Cycling
- Current team: Focus
- Discipline: Mountain biking
- Role: Rider
- Rider type: Cross-country, cross-country eliminator

Major wins
- World Championships Cross-country eliminator (2017, 2018, 2019, 2020)
Medal record
Representing France
Men's mountain bike racing
World Championships
Gold medal – first place	2017 Chengdu	Cross-country eliminator
Gold medal – first place	2018 Chengdu	Cross-country eliminator
Gold medal – first place	2019 Waregem	Cross-country eliminator
Gold medal – first place	2020 Leuven	Cross-country eliminator
Gold medal – first place	2022 Barcelona	Cross-country eliminator
Gold medal – first place	2023 Palangkaraya	Cross-country eliminator
European Championships
Gold medal – first place	2017 Darfo Boario Terme	Cross-country eliminator
Gold medal – first place	2018 Graz-Stattegg	Cross-country eliminator
Gold medal – first place	2020 Monteceneri	Cross-country eliminator
Silver medal – second place	2019 Brno	Cross-country eliminator
Silver medal – second place	2023 Sakarya	Cross-country eliminator

Titouan Perrin-Ganier (born 28 June 1991) is a French cross-country mountain biker. He specializes in the cross-country eliminator event, in which he is a six-time world champion. He was also European champion in the cross-country eliminator in 2017 and 2018. Ganier is also a nine-time national cross-country eliminator champion, winning six consecutive years from 2013 to 2018 and again from 2020 to 2022.

== Major results ==
2009
2nd National Junior XCO Championships
2013
1st National XCE Championships
2014
1st National XCE Championships
2015
1st National XCE Championships
2016
1st National XCE Championships
2017
1st UCI World XCE Championships
1st European XCE Championships
1st National XCE Championships
2018
1st UCI World XCE Championships
1st European XCE Championships
1st National XCE Championships
2019
1st UCI World XCE Championships
2nd Overall UCI XCE World Cup
2nd European XCE Championships
2nd National XCE Championships
2020
1st UCI World XCE Championships
1st European XCE Championships
1st National XCE Championships
2021
1st National XCE Championships
3rd Overall UCI XCE World Cup

1st Winterberg
1st Jablines–Annet
3rd Leuven

2022
1st UCI World XCE Championships
1st National XCE Championships
2nd Overall UCI XCE World Cup

1st Abu Dhabi
2nd Winterberg
2nd Aalen
2nd Oudenaarde
2nd Paris

2023
1st UCI World XCE Championships
1st Overall UCI XCE World Cup

1st Adapazarı–Sakarya
1st Leuven
2nd Aalen

2nd European XCE Championships
2nd National XCE Championships
