= Rébecca Beaumont =

Canadian cyclist

Personal information
- Full name: Rébecca Beaumont
- Born: 12 September 1990 (age 36)

Cycling career
- Sport: Cycling
- Disciplines: Road; Mountain biking
- Role: Rider

Professional team
- 2018–2019: Team Illuminate

Rébecca Beaumont (born 12 September 1990) is a Canadian professional racing cyclist, who last rode for the UCI Women's Team Team Illuminate during the 2019 women's road cycling season.

From Alma, Quebec, Beaumont first competed in cross-country mountain biking, racing for the Cyclone d'Alma club. She was selected for Canada's team in the elite women's cross-country race at the 2016 and 2017 UCI Mountain Bike World Championships, finishing 41st at the 2017 edition in Cairns, Australia. She also won the women's race of the Traversée du lac Saint-Jean à vélo, a 32 km (20 mi) fatbike crossing of the frozen Lac Saint-Jean.
