= Steve Smith (cyclist) =

Canadian mountain biker

Stevie Smith
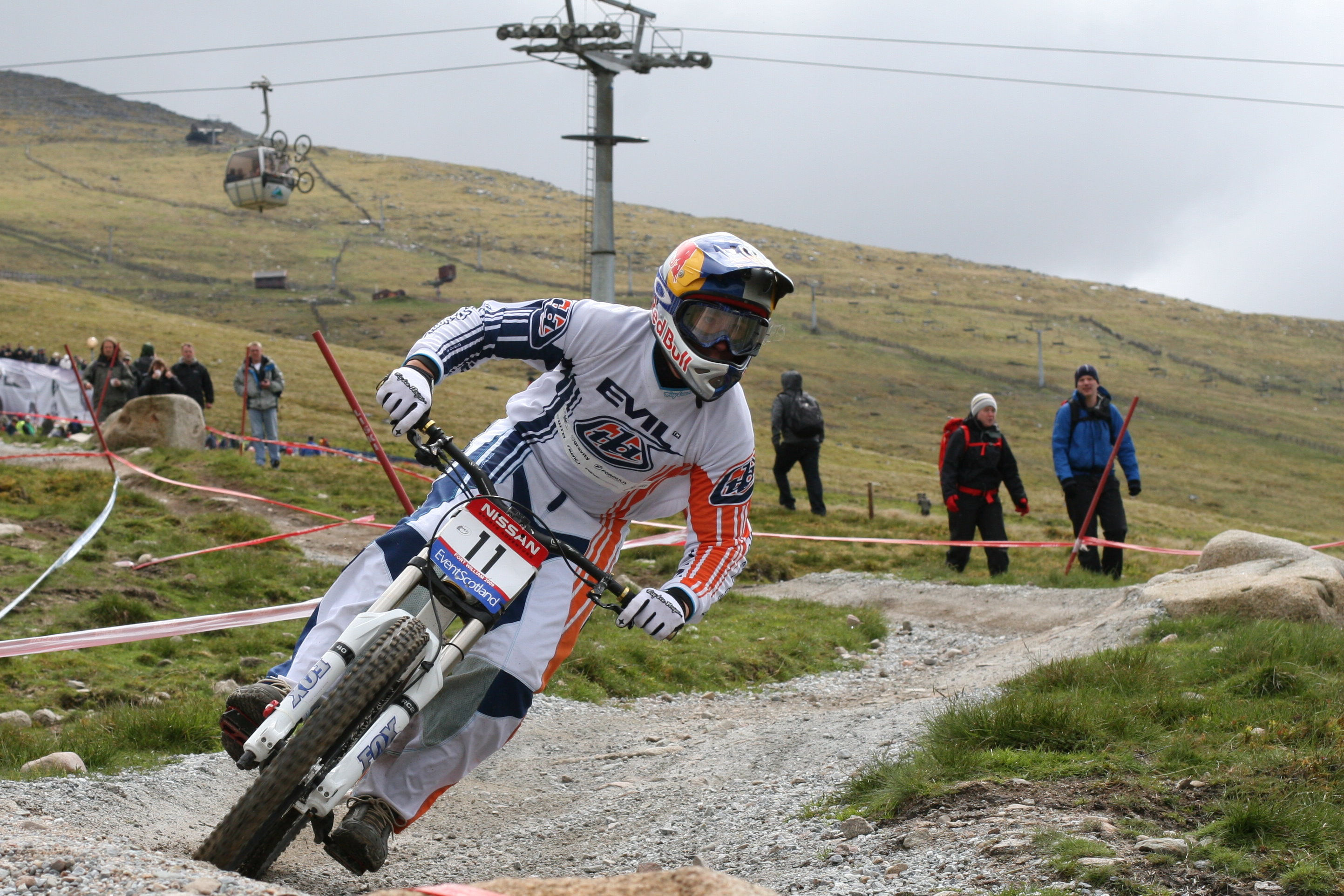
- Steve Smith at Fort William World Cup 2009

Personal information
- Nickname: Chainsaw
- Born: 25 November 1989 Cassidy, British Columbia, Canada
- Died: 10 May 2016 (aged 26) Nanaimo, British Columbia, Canada

Cycling career
- Sport: Cycling
- Current team: Devinci Global Racing
- Discipline: MTB
- Role: Rider
- Rider type: DH

Major wins
- (Canada) Canadian DH National Champion; UCI DH World Cup (4 Wins); UCI DH World Cup overall winner 2013
Medal record
Representing Canada
Men's downhill mountain biking
World Championships
Silver medal – second place	2010 Mont Sainte-Anne	Downhill
Bronze medal – third place	2012 Leogang-Saalfelden	Downhill
World Cup
Gold medal – first place	2013 Overall	Downhill

Steve Smith (25 November 1989 – 10 May 2016), commonly known as Stevie Smith, was a Canadian professional downhill mountain biker.

== Biography ==
Born in Cassidy, British Columbia, Smith was (as of September 2013) 2nd in the world rankings on the Union Cycliste Internationale (UCI) Downhill Mountain Bike circuit. In 2013 Steve Smith secured his first overall victory in the UCI DHI World Cup by winning the last race in Leogang, Austria. This made him the first Canadian to win the UCI DHI World Cup.

On 10 May 2016, Smith died after suffering a brain injury resulting from an enduro motorcycle accident in his hometown of Nanaimo, British Columbia.
