= Alexandra Engen =

Swedish cyclist

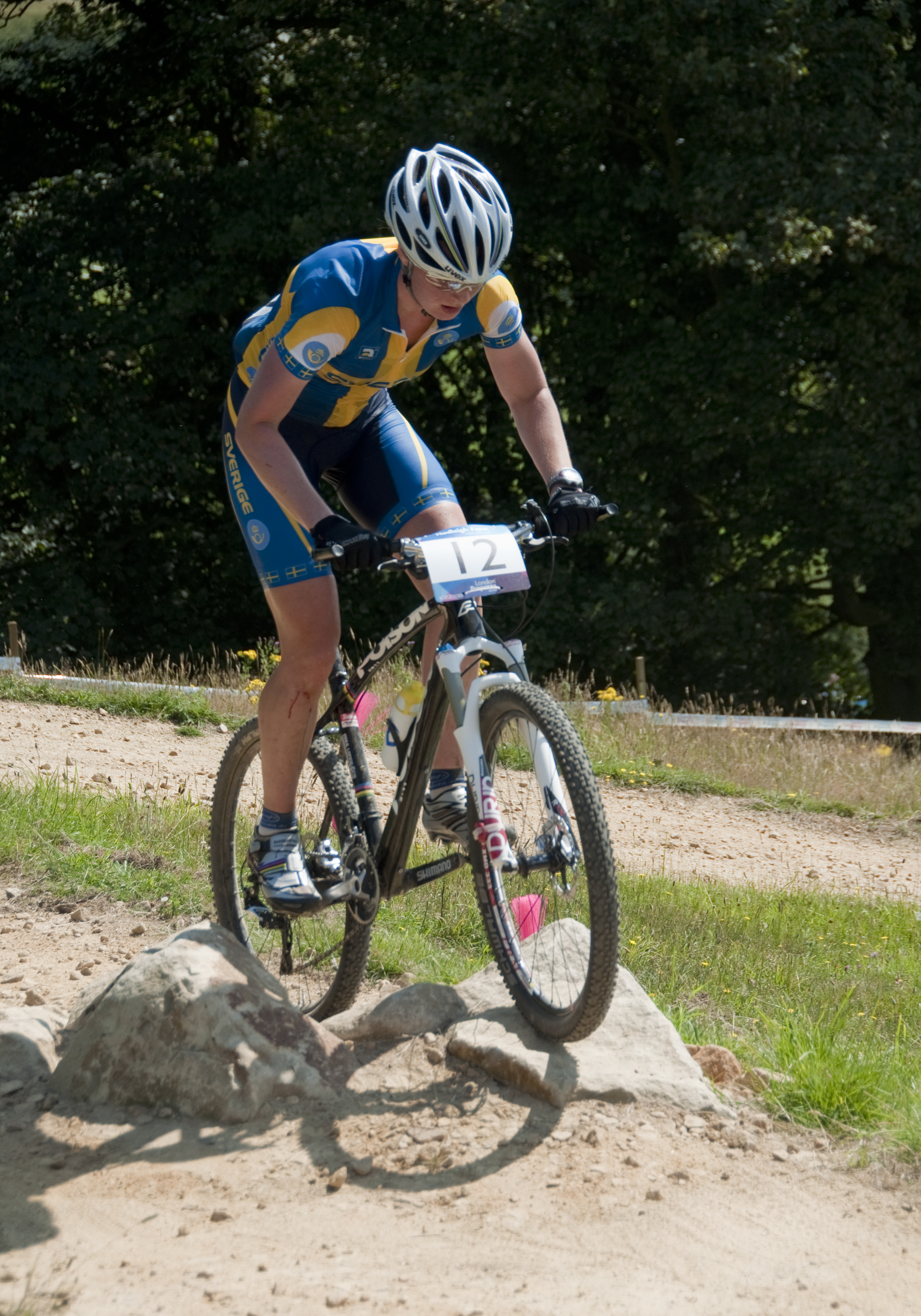

Personal information
- Born: 5 January 1988 (age 38) Sarpsborg, Norway
- Height: 174 cm (5 ft 9 in)
- Weight: 64 kg (141 lb)

Cycling career
- Sport: Cycling
- Current team: GHOST Factory Racing Team
- Discipline: Mountain bike racing
- Role: Rider
Medal record
Women's Mountain bike racing
World Championships
Gold medal – first place	2012 Saalfelden	Eliminator
Gold medal – first place	2013 Pietermaritzburg	Eliminator
European Championships
Gold medal – first place	2009 Zoetermeer	Team relay
Bronze medal – third place	2008 St. Wendel	Team relay
World U23 Championships
Gold medal – first place	2010 Mt. Sainte-Anne	Cross Country
European U23 Championships
Gold medal – first place	2010 Haifa	Cross Country
Silver medal – second place	2009 Zoetermeer	Cross Country
European Junior Championships
Bronze medal – third place	2006 Alpago	Cross Country

Alexandra Engen (born 5 January 1988) is a Swedish cross country cyclist. Engen qualified for the 2012 Summer Olympics in London and finished 6th in the final. She lives in Freiburg im Breisgau, Germany. Engen is two-time world champion in cross-country eliminator.

== World Cup podiums ==
Season	Place	Date	Location	Discipline
2013
2013	1st	17 May 2013	Albstadt, Germany	XCE
2013	3rd	24 May 2013	Nové Město, Czech Republic	XCE
2013	1st	13 June 2013	Val di Sole, Italy	XCE
2013	2nd	25 July 2013	Vallnord, Andorra	XCE
