= Mical Dyck =

Canadian cyclist

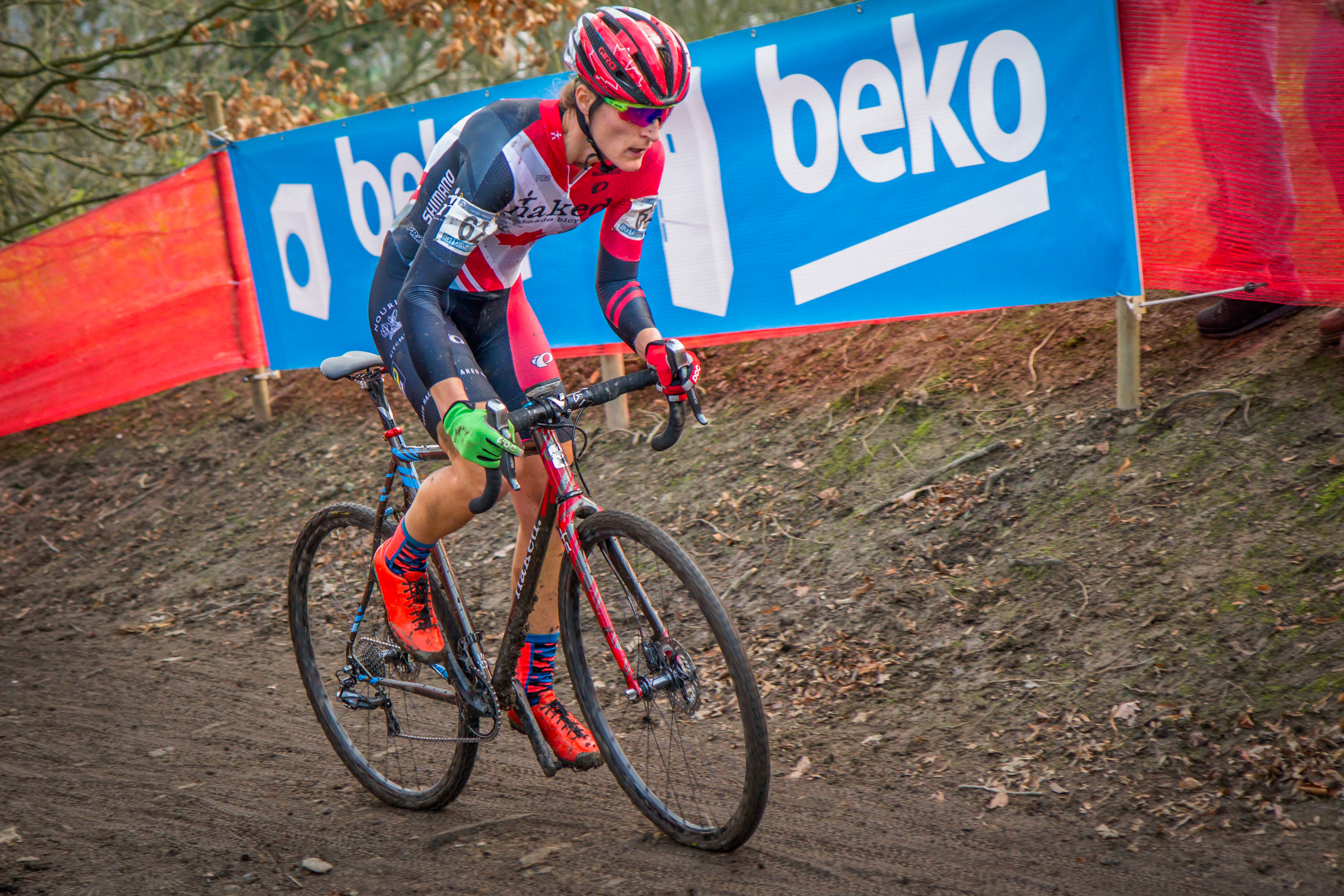

Personal information
- Born: 11 February 1982 (age 44)

Cycling career
- Sport: Cycling
- Discipline: Cyclo-cross
- Role: Rider

Mical Dyck (born 11 February 1982) is a Canadian female cyclo-cross cyclist. She represented her nation in the women's elite event at the 2016 UCI Cyclo-cross World Championships in Heusden-Zolder, Belgium.

Mical Dyck won the Single Speed Cyclocross World Championship in 2015 in Victoria Island, B.C., Canada.
