= Luke Strobel =

American mountain biker

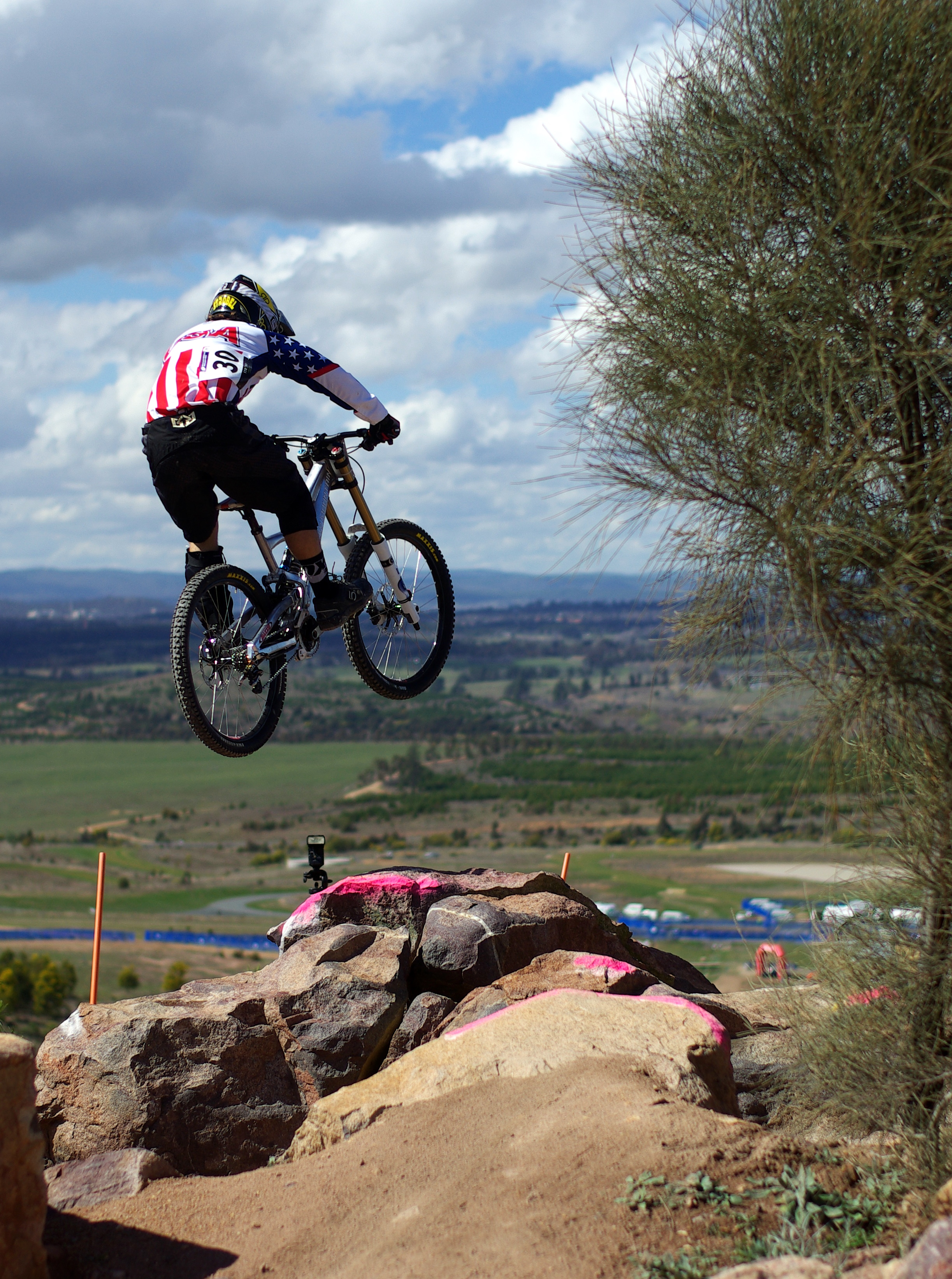
Strobel competing at the 2009 UCI Mountain Bike & Trials World Championships in Canberra, Australia. He finished 39th.

Luke Strobel is a downhill mountain bike rider from Issaquah, Washington, rating several times as the highest-ranked American rider. He began competing internationally in 2006, and is signed with Maxxis Tyres. In August 2009, he won the Mt Snow downhill title on the US ProXCT.
