= Fabrice Mels =

Belgian cyclist

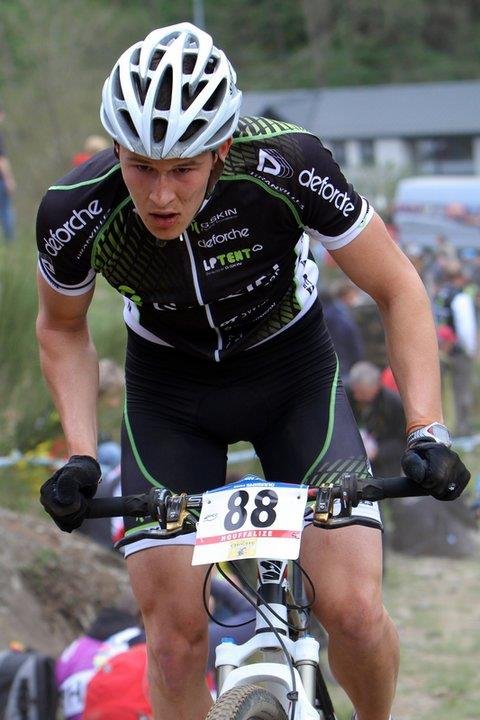

Personal information
- Nickname: Fabi
- Born: 17 August 1992 (age 34) Sint-Niklaas, Belgium

Cycling career
- Sport: Cycling
- Current team: Illi Bikes–Wolf
- Disciplines: Mountain biking, Road
- Role: Rider
- Rider type: Cross-country, Cross-country eliminator

Professional teams
- 2014: Cibel
- 2015: Team3M

Major wins
- World Championships Cross-country eliminator (2017) UCI Mountain Bike World Cup Cross-country eliminator (2014)
Medal record
Representing Belgium
Men's mountain bike racing
World Championships
Gold medal – first place	2014 Lillehammer-Hafjell	Cross-country eliminator
Bronze medal – third place	2016 Nové Město	Cross-country eliminator
European Championships
Bronze medal – third place	2014	Cross-country eliminator

Fabrice Mels (born 17 August 1992 in Sint-Niklaas) is a Belgian professional mountain biker, who specializes in the cross-country eliminator. In 2014, has the world champion in the cross-country eliminator. He is a five-time national champion of this event. He also won the 2014 UCI XCE World Cup.
