= Paul van der Ploeg =

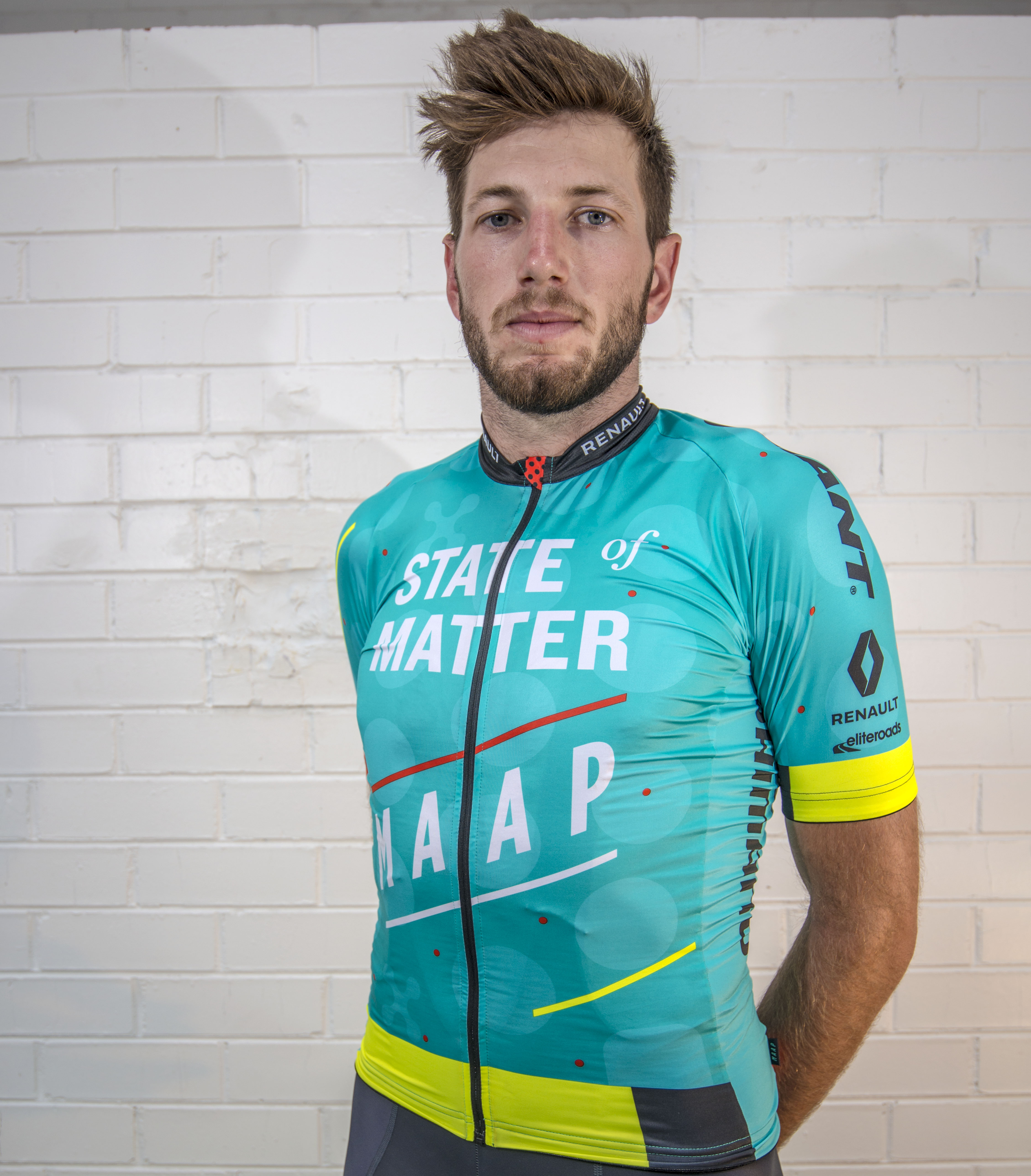

Personal information
- Born: 19 November 1989 (age 36)

Cycling career
- Sport: Cycling
- Disciplines: Mountain biking, Road, Cyclo-cross
- Role: Rider

Amateur teams
- 2008: Felt Bicycles–Sram Components
- 2013: Corbusier Sarawak
- 2014: Satalyst Giant Racing Team

Professional teams
- 2009: Discovertasmania.com
- 2010–2012: Felt Oetztal X-Bionic
- 2015–2016: Charter Mason–Giant Racing Team

Major wins
- World Championships Cross-country eliminator (2013)
Medal record
Representing Australia
Men's mountain bike racing
World Championships
Gold medal – first place	2013	Cross-country eliminator
Oceanian Championships
Gold medal – first place	2015	Cross-country eliminator
Gold medal – first place	2010	Under-23 Cross-country
Bronze medal – third place	2012	4-Cross

Paul van der Ploeg (born 9 November 1989) is an Australian cyclist, specializing cross-country mountain biking.

== Major results ==
=== Road ===
2013
1st Stage 1 Tour de Borneo
2015
1st Prologue Tour de Perth

=== Cyclo-cross ===
2015-2016
1st National Cyclo-cross Championships

=== Mountain ===
2008
1st Under-23 National Cross-country Championships
2010
1st Under-23 Oceania Cross-country Championships
1st Under-23 National Cross-country Championships
2012
3rd Oceania 4-cross Championships
2013
1st World Cross-country Eliminator Championships
1st National Cross-country Eliminator Championships
2015
1st Oceania Cross-country Eliminator Championships
1st National Cross-country Eliminator Championships
