= Daniel McConnell (cyclist) =

Australian cross-country mountain biker (born 1985)

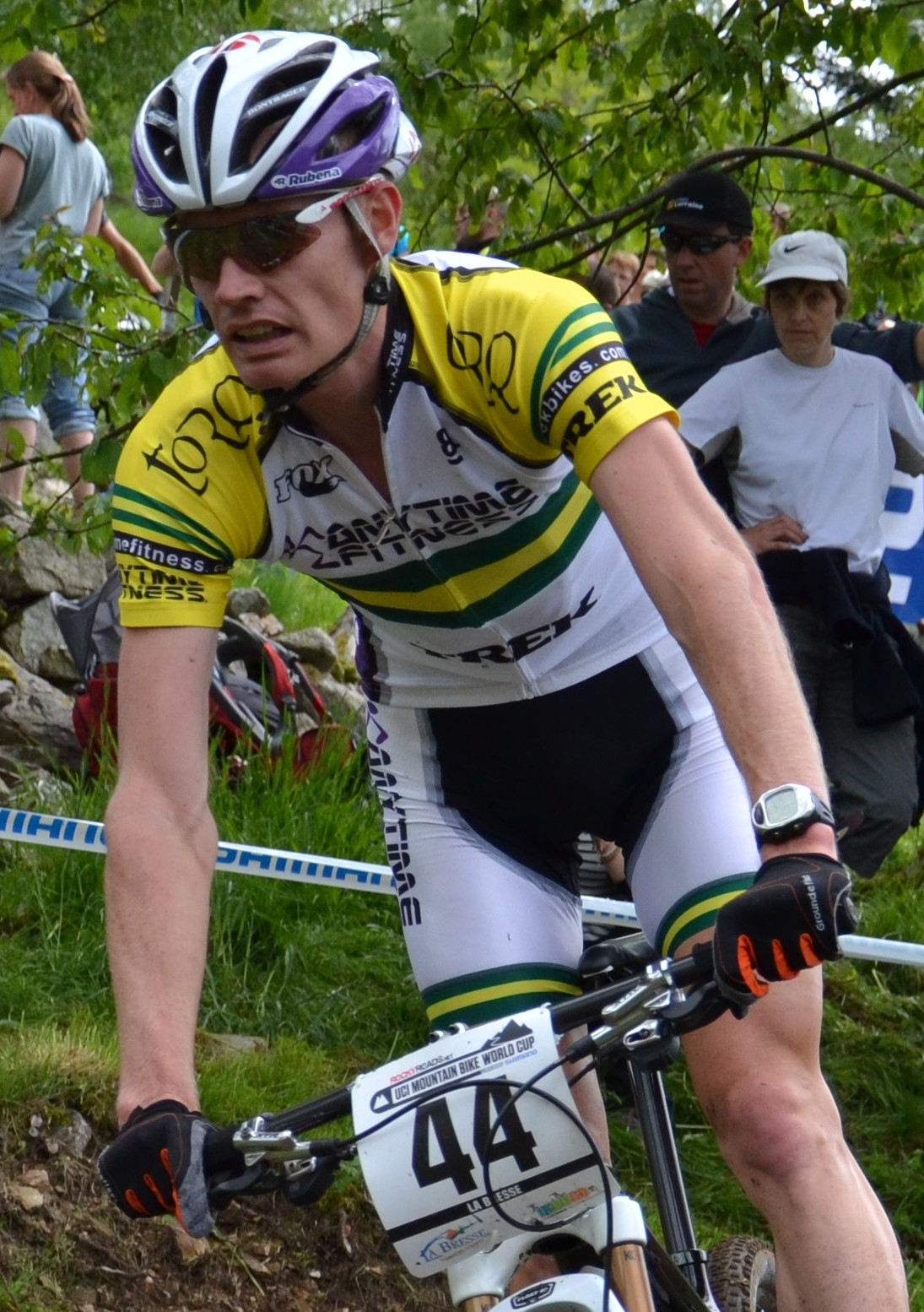

Personal information
- Full name: Daniel McConnell
- Nickname: Big D
- Born: 9 August 1985 (age 41) Bruthen, Victoria
- Height: 1.81 m (5 ft 11 in)
- Weight: 67 kg (148 lb)

Cycling career
- Sport: Cycling
- Current team: Primaflor Mondraker Rotor
- Discipline: Mountain bike racing
- Role: Rider
- Rider type: Cross-country

Professional teams
- 2006–2007: Southaustralia.com–AIS
- 2009–2010: Torq Performance Nutrition (MTB)
- 2013–2016: Trek Factory Racing (MTB)
- 2015: Trek Factory Racing
- 2018–: Primaflor Mondraker Rotor

Major wins
- Mountain bike XC World Cup 1 individual win (2013)
Medal record
Men's mountain bike racing
Representing Australia
World Cup
Silver medal – second place	2013 Overall	Cross-country
Bronze medal – third place	2014 Overall	Cross-country
Commonwealth Games
Bronze medal – third place	2014 Glasgow	Cross country

Daniel McConnell (born 9 August 1985) is an Australian cross-country mountain biker. McConnell qualified for the 2020 Tokyo Olympics. He finished 30th in the men's cross-country event.

== Early years ==
McConnell began cycling at 13 years of age. After 4 years of dedication to the sport, at the age of 17, McConnell was chosen for the Australian Team in 2002. At the age of 23 McConnell made his Olympic debut at the 2008 Beijing Games. He was placed 39th in the mountain bike cross-country event.

== Achievements ==
At the 2012 Summer Olympics, McConnell competed in the Men's cross-country at Hadleigh Farm, finishing in 21st place. T

At the 2014 Commonwealth Games, he won the bronze medal in the men's cross-country cycling, finishing ten seconds behind the winner.

His mother, Jenny Orr, competed at the 1972 Summer Olympics in the 800 and 1500 metres athletics.

He was married to Australian Elite mountain biker Rebecca Henderson. She also qualified for the 2020 Tokyo Olympics and finished 28th in the women’s cross-country event.

== Major results ==
=== Mountain bike ===
2008
3rd Cross-country, Oceania Championships
2009
1st Cross-country, Oceania Championships
2010
1st Cross-country, Oceania Championships
1st Cross-country, National Championships
2011
1st Short track, Oceania Championships
2012
1st Cross-country, Oceania Championships
1st Cross-country, National Championships
2013
1st Cross-country, Oceania Championships
2nd Overall UCI World Cup

1st Albstadt

2014
1st Cross-country, Oceania Championships
3rd Cross-country, Commonwealth Games
3rd Overall UCI World Cup

3rd Mont-Sainte-Anne

2015
1st Cross-country, Oceania Championships
1st Cross-country, National Championships
2016
2nd Cross-country, Oceania Championships
2017
1st Cross-country, National Championships
3rd Cross-country, Oceania Championships
2019
1st Cross-country, National Championships
2020
1st Cross-country, National Championships
3rd Cross-country, Oceania Championships
2021
National Championships

1st Cross-country
1st Short track

=== Road ===
2006
3rd Overall Tour of Gippsland

1st Stage 9

3rd Overall Tour de Hokkaido
8th GP Palio del Recioto
