= Aleksandra Dawidowicz =

Polish cyclist (born 1987)

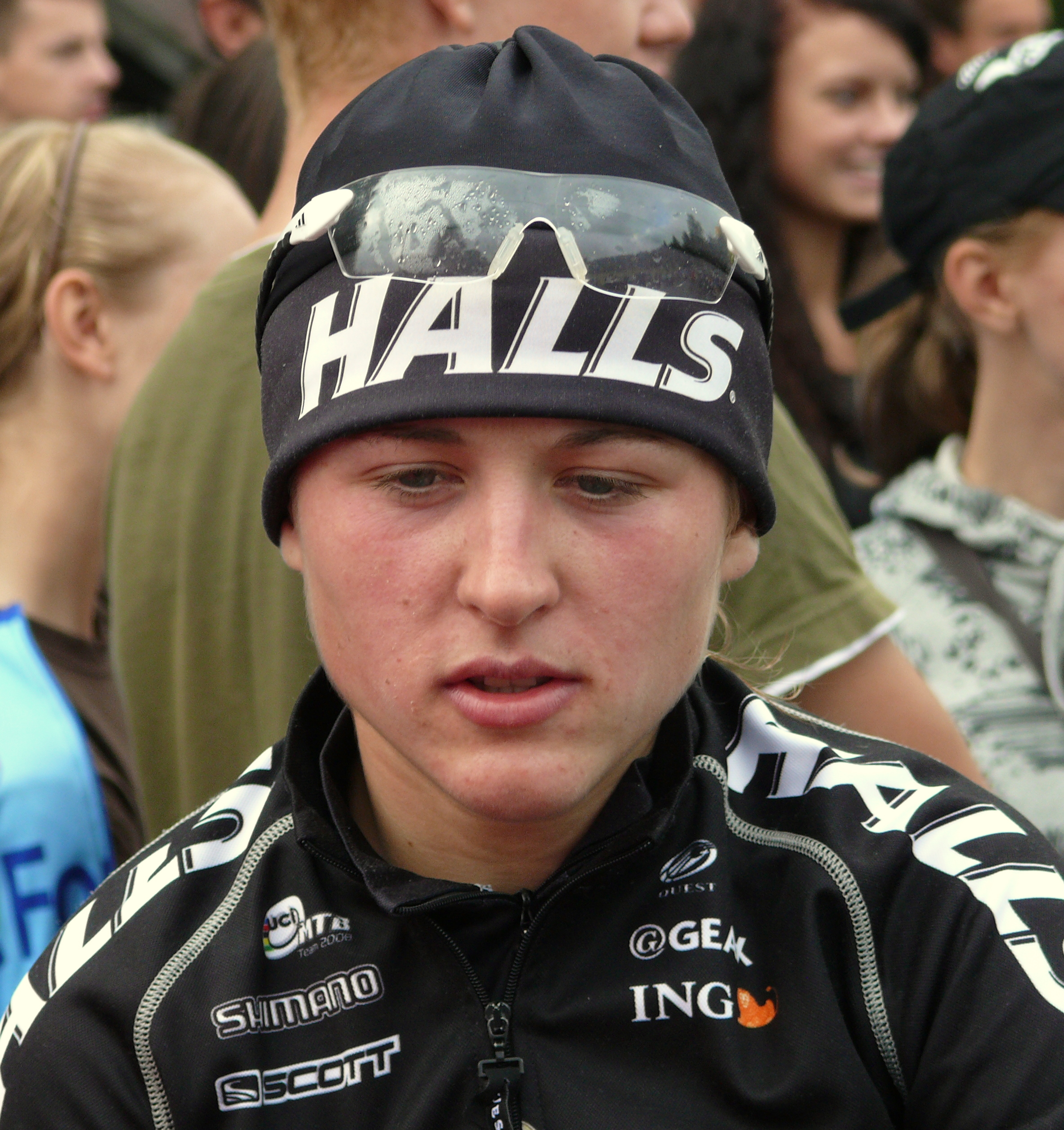
- Dawidowicz in 2008

Personal information
- Full name: Aleksandra Dawidowicz
- Born: 4 February 1987 (age 39) Kalisz, Poland

Cycling career
- Sport: Cycling
- Disciplines: Mountain bike and road
- Role: Rider
- Rider type: MTB: Cross-country

Aleksandra Dawidowicz (born 4 February 1987) is a Polish cyclist. She was born in Kalisz. She competed in cross-country at the 2008 Summer Olympics in Beijing, where she placed tenth. She competed again at the 2012 Summer Olympics, finishing 7th.
