= Simon Gegenheimer =

German cross-country mountain biker

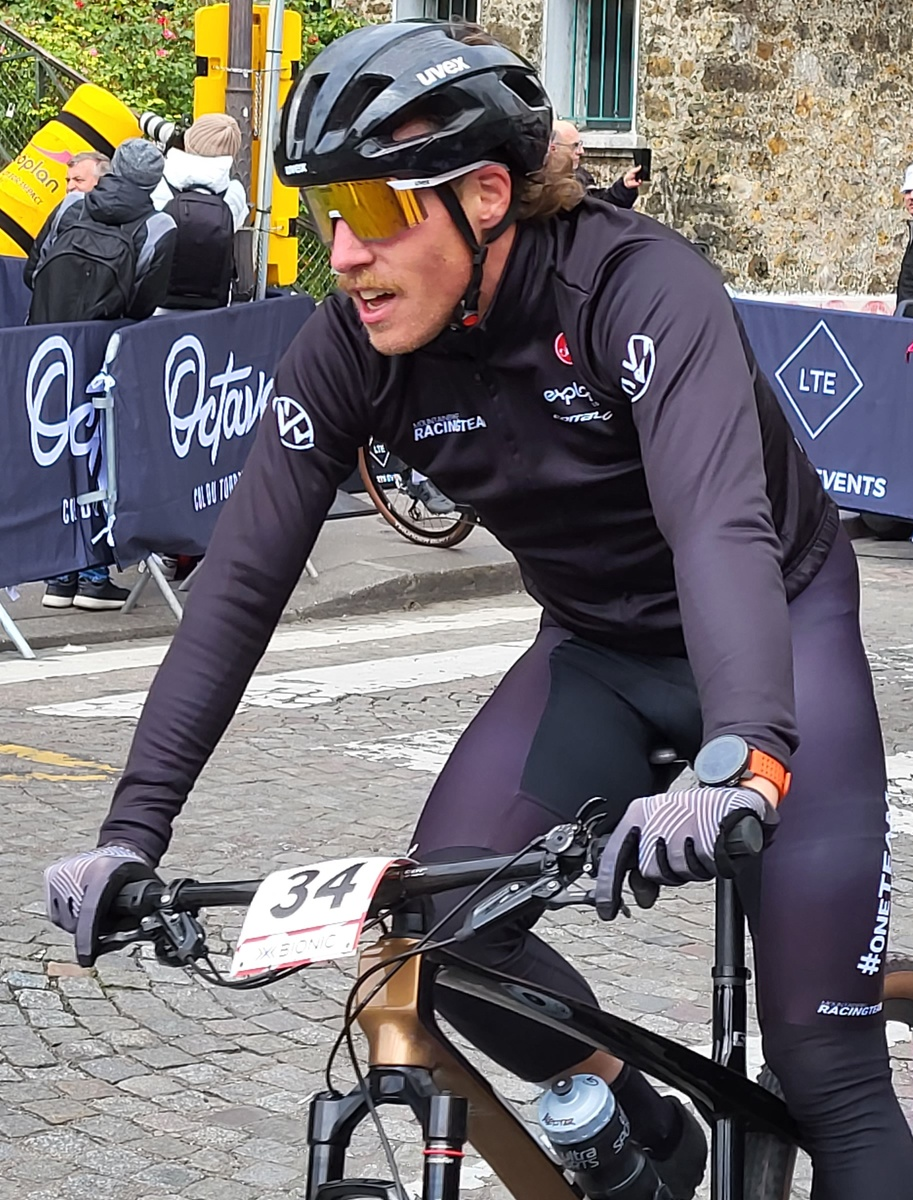
- Gegenheimer in 2024

Personal information
- Full name: Simon Gegenheimer
- Born: 17 December 1988 (age 37) Remchingen, Germany

Cycling career
- Sport: Cycling
- Current team: ROSE Vaujany fueled by ultraSPORTS
- Discipline: Mountain biking
- Role: Rider
- Rider type: Cross-country eliminator

Major wins
- German MTB Championships Cross-country eliminator (2012, 2013, 2016, 2018)
Medal record
Representing Germany
Men's mountain bike racing
World Championships
Gold medal – first place	2021 Graz	Cross-country eliminator
Silver medal – second place	2016 Nové Město	Cross-country eliminator
Silver medal – second place	2017 Chengdu	Cross-country eliminator
Silver medal – second place	2020 Leuven	Cross-country eliminator
Bronze medal – third place	2015 Vallnord	Cross-country eliminator

Simon Gegenheimer is a German cross-country mountain biker. He competes in the cross-country, cross-country eliminator, and cross-country marathon events. He won the German national championship in the cross-country eliminator in 2012, 2013, and 2016. In 2016 he won the silver medal in the cross-country eliminator at the world championships in Nové Město na Moravě, Czech Republic. He also won the 2017 UCI XCE World Cup. His biggest success has been the World Championship title at the 2021 cross-country eliminator World Championship in Graz.
