= Kathrin Stirnemann =

Swiss cyclist

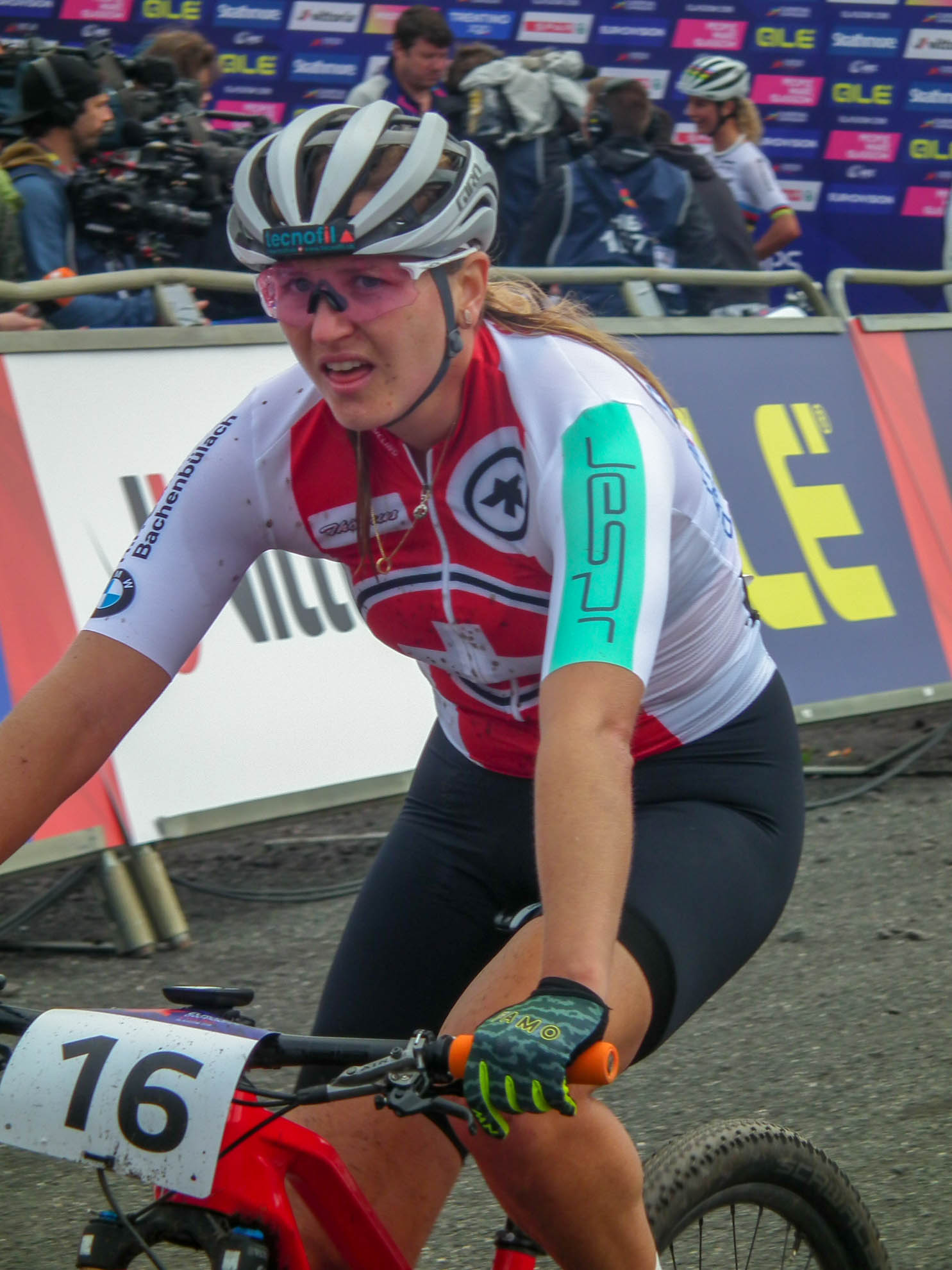
- Stirnemann in 2018

Personal information
- Full name: Kathrin Stirnemann
- Born: 22 October 1989 (age 36)

Cycling career
- Sport: Cycling
- Current team: Retired
- Disciplines: Road; Mountain biking
- Role: Rider

Professional team
- 2020: Bigla–Katusha

Kathrin Stirnemann (born 22 October 1989) is a Swiss former professional racing cyclist, who won a silver medal in the mixed team relay event at the 2020 European Road Championships.

== Major results ==
2020
2nd Mixed team relay, UEC European Road Championships
