= Cross-country eliminator =

Cross-country eliminator (XCE) is a mountain bike race format in which four riders compete against each other over a very short course. In each heat, the two fastest riders get to the next round, while the two slower riders are eliminated from the race. It is similar to four-cross, except that the course is not downhill.

Cross-country eliminator races have a maximum duration of 60 seconds. The format differs from the classic cross-country race both in its sprint character and the separation of the race into heats. The track itself is similar to XC tracks, going both uphill and downhill with natural and/or artificial obstacles.

== History ==
First introduced in 2010 in Germany, the cross-country eliminator format was tested in two UCI events: in Pickering (as part of the world cup in Dalby Forest) (UK) and Nove Mesto na Morave (CZE) in 2011. It was officially integrated into the World Cup in 2012 with three events in Houffalize (BEL), Nove Mesto na Morave (CZE) and La Bresse (FRA).

The first UCI Mountain Bike World Cup XCE race took place on April 13, 2012 in Houffalize, Belgium and was won by Brian Lopes (USA), and Annie Last (UK). The discipline was removed from the World Cup after 2014, then reintroduced in 2017.

The first UCI Mountain Bike World Championships XCE race was held on September 9, 2012 in Saalfelden, Austria. Ralph Naef was the first world champion in 2012 in Saalfelden. In 2013 in Pietermaritzburg it was Paul Van Der Ploeg who became world champion. Fabrice Mels took the world championship title in 2014 in Lillehammer.

In 2017, the event was moved to the new UCI Urban Cycling World Championships. After the 2018 edition the event was moved to its own separate championship.

== See also ==
- UCI Urban Cycling World Championships – Men's cross-country eliminator
- UCI Urban Cycling World Championships – Women's cross-country eliminator
