= 2023 UCI Mountain Bike season =

2023Season of Mountain Bike

Details
- Dates: 14 January –
- Location: World

The 2023 UCI Mountain Bike season is the eighteenth season of the UCI Mountain Bike season. The 2023 season began on 14 January with the Israel Cup in Israel and ends in December 2023.

== Events ==
=== January ===
Date	Race Name	Location	Class	Winner	Second	Third	Ref
14 January	Israel Cup #2	(Israel) Mishmar HaEmek	2	Gil Ly Gonen (ISR); Na'ama Noyman (ISR)	Yotam Deshe (ISR); Naomi Luria (ISR)	Tomer Zaltsman (ISR); Romi Veldnizki (ISR)	
15 January	Short Track Internacional UCI Santa María	(Argentina) Santa María	3	Tomás Montenegro (ARG); Agustina Quirós (ARG)	Francisco Zorzenon (ARG)	Isidro Macazaga (ARG)	
21 January	AusCycling MTB National Series #1	(Australia) Canberra	2	Sam Fox (AUS); Rebecca Henderson (AUS)	Daniel McConnell (AUS); Zoe Cuthbert (AUS)	Cameron Ivory (AUS); Katherine Hosking (AUS)	
21 January	Momentum Medical Scheme Attakwas Extreme	(South Africa) Oudtshoorn	1	Matthew Beers (RSA); Sarah Hill (RSA)	Alex Miller (NAM); Elrika Harmzen (RSA)	Tristan Nortje (RSA); Catherine Colyn (RSA)	
22 January	AusCycling MTB National Series #2	(Australia) Canberra	2	Sam Fox (AUS); Rebecca Henderson (AUS)	Brent Rees (AUS); Zoe Cuthbert (AUS)	Domenic Paolilli (AUS); Katherine Hosking (AUS)	
26–29 January	Five Continents Stage Race Costa Blanca – XCMS	(Spain) Calpe	S1	Emil Hasund Eid (NOR); Janika Lõiv (EST)	Krzysztof Łukasik (POL); Mónica Calderón (COL)	Alexey Medvedev (); Rosa van Doorn (NED)	
27–29 January	Copa Chile Internacional Valdivia	(Chile) Valdivia	1	Martín Vidaurre (CHI) (XCO); Raiza Goulão (BRA) (XCO); Martín Vidaurre (CHI) (XCC); Raiza Goulão (BRA) (XCC)	José Gabriel Marques (BRA) (XCO); Hercília Najara (BRA) (XCO); Nicolas Delich (CHI) (XCC); Catalina Vidaurre (CHI) (XCC)	Joel Fernando Contreras (ARG) (XCO); Catalina Vidaurre (CHI) (XCO); Ignacio Gallo (CHI) (XCC); Hercília Najara (BRA) (XCC)	
28 January	Kizilalan MTB Cup	(Turkey) Antalya	2	Tomer Zaltsman (ISR); Alina Sarkulova (KAZ)	Furkan Akçam (TUR); Maria Sherstiuk (UKR)	Emre Yavuz (TUR); Tatyana Geneleva (KAZ)	
28 January	Hellenic XCC Series #1	(Greece) Attica	3	Alexandros Athanasiadis (GRE); Eleftheria Giachou (GRE)	Dimitrios Antoniadis (GRE); Alexandra Adam (GRE)	Charoun Molla (GRE); Eirini Karousou (GRE)	
28 January	Club La Santa 4 Stage MTB Lanzarote-1st Race – 42Km	(Spain) Lanzarote	3	Kristian Andersen (DEN); Tessa Kortekaas (NED)	Karl Markt (AUT); Amy Henchoz (GBR)	Jacob Reyes (ESP); Manuela Mureșan (ROU)	
29 January	Club La Santa 4 Stage MTB Lanzarote-2nd Race – 58Km	(Spain) Lanzarote	3	Kristian Andersen (DEN); Tessa Kortekaas (NED)	Karl Markt (AUT); Amy Henchoz (GBR)	Christian Kornum (DEN); Manuela Mureșan (ROU)	
29 January	Kizilalan MTB Cup	(Turkey) Antalya	1	Furkan Akçam (TUR); Alina Sarkulova (KAZ)	Abdülkadir Kelleci (TUR); Tatyana Geneleva (KAZ)	Emre Yavuz (TUR); Maria Sherstiuk (UKR)	
31 January	Club La Santa 4 Stage MTB Lanzarote-4th Race – 82Km	(Spain) Lanzarote	1	Kristian Andersen (DEN); Tessa Kortekaas (NED)	Karl Markt (AUT); Manuela Mureșan (ROU)	Jacob Reyes (ESP); Amy Henchoz (GBR)	

=== February ===
Date	Race Name	Location	Class	Winner	Second	Third	Ref
2–5 February	La Leyenda de Tartessos	(Spain) El Rompido	S2	Jofre Cullell (ESP); Janina Wüst (SUI)	Héctor Leonardo Páez (COL); Tessa Kortekaas (NED)	José Dias (POR); Terese Andersson (SWE)	
3–5 February	Copa Colombia MTB I	(Colombia) Ginebra	2	Juan Fernando Monroy (COL) (XCO); Gloria Garzón Melo (COL) (XCO); Juan Fernando Monroy (COL) (XCC); Ana María Roa (COL) (XCC)	Jhonnatan Botero Villegas (COL) (XCO); Ana María Roa (COL) (XCO); Hilvar Yamid Malaver (COL) (XCC); Angie Milena Lara (COL) (XCC)	Nelson Peña Franco (COL) (XCO); Camila Cagua (COL) (XCO); Diego Arìas (COL) (XCC); María José Salamanca (COL) (XCC)	
4 February 2023	SA XCO Cup Series – Round #1	(South Africa) Cape Town	2	Alan Hatherly (RSA); Alessandra Keller (SUI)	Victor Koretzky (FRA); Nicole Koller (SUI)	Alex Miller (NAM); Caroline Bohé (DEN)	
4 February	Volcat Platja D'Aro – 1	(Spain) Castell-Platja d'Aro	3	Tom Schellekens (NED); Kelsey Urban (USA)	Hugo Drechou (FRA); Savilia Blunk (USA)	Bradyn Lange (USA); Meritxell Figueras (ESP)	
5 February	Western Cape XCO Cup	(South Africa) Stellenbosch	2	Nino Schurter (SUI); Kate Courtney (USA)	Filippo Colombo (SUI); Nicole Koller (SUI)	Andri Frischknecht (SUI); Alessandra Keller (SUI)	
5 February	Volcat Platja D'Aro – 2	(Spain) Castell-Platja d'Aro	3	Cole Paton (USA); Kelsey Urban (USA)	Bradyn Lange (USA); Kelsey Urban (USA)	Tom Schellekens (NED); Meritxell Figueras (ESP)	
5 February	XCO Cup Costa Blanca	(Spain) Alicante	2	Sam Gaze (NZL); Raquel Queirós (POR)	Ondřej Cink (CZE); Matylda Szczecińska (POL)	Emil Hasund Eid (NOR); Lucía Gómez (ESP)	
9–12 February	Momentum Medical Scheme Tankwa Trek	(South Africa) Ceres	S1	Tristan Nortje (RSA); Anne Terpstra (NED)	Matthew Beers (RSA); Nicole Koller (SUI)	Marco Joubert (RSA); Isla Short (GBR)	
9–12 February	Mediterranean Epic	(Spain) Oropesa del Mar	SHC	Georg Egger (GER); Luisa Daubermann (GER)	Krzysztof Łukasik (POL); Janina Wüst (SUI)	Martin Štosek (CZE); Mónica Calderon (COL)	
11 February	Israel Cup #3	(Israel) Mishmar HaEmek	2	Gil Ly Gonen (ISR); Na'ama Noyman (ISR)	Tomer Zaltsman (ISR); Naomi Luria (ISR)	Yotam Deshe (ISR); Romi Veldnizki (ISR)	
12 February	Valparaíso Cerro Abajo	(Chile) Valparaíso	3	Tomáš Slavík (CZE)	Juan Muñoz (COL)	Lucas Borba (BRA)	
12 February	Shimano Super Cup Massi	(Spain) La Nucia	1	Sam Gaze (NZL); Malene Degn (DEN)	David Valero (ESP); Linda Indergand (SUI)	Sebastian Fini (DEN); Jennifer Jackson (CAN)	
18–19 February	Internacionales XCO Chelva GSPORT Challenge	(Spain) Chelva	HC	Vlad Dascălu (ROU); Martina Berta (ITA)	Pierre de Froidmont (BEL); Evie Richards (GBR)	David Campos (ESP); Anne Tauber (NED)	
18–19 February	Costa Rican Open Of Downhill 2023	(Costa Rica) Cartago	2	Neko Mulally (USA); Riley Miller (USA)	Tyler Ervin (USA); Lucy Attebury (USA)	Vladislav Sherryble; Silvia Elizondo (CRC)	
19 February	Clásico de Florida	(Puerto Rico) Florida	1	Gerardo Ulloa (MEX); Daniela Campuzano (MEX)	Georwill Pérez (PUR); Emily Batty (CAN)	Alexandre Bouchard (CAN); Erika Monserrat Rodríguez (MEX)	
23 February	Greek MTB Series – Salamina Epic Race #1	(Greece) Salamis	2	Jens Schuermans (BEL); Githa Michiels (BEL)	Gil Ly Gonen (ISR); Tereza Tvarůžková (CZE)	Arne Janssens (BEL); Naama Noyman (ISR)	
24 February	Greek MTB Series – Salamina Epic Race #2	(Greece) Salamis	1	Jens Schuermans (BEL); Naama Noyman (ISR)	Gil Ly Gonen (ISR); Githa Michiels (BEL)	Jakob Söderqvist (SWE); Isaure Medde (FRA)	
24 February	Shimano Super Cup Massi XCC	(Spain) Banyoles	HC	Luca Schwarzbauer (GER); Loana Lecomte (FRA)	Henrique Avancini (BRA); Nicole Koller (SUI)	Alan Hatherly (RSA); Anne Terpstra (NED)	
25–26 February	Tropical Mountain Bike Challenge	(Puerto Rico) Salinas	HC	Gerardo Ulloa (MEX) (XCO); Gwendalyn Gibson (USA) (XCO); Martín Vidaurre (CHI) (XCC); Gwendalyn Gibson (USA) (XCC)	Martín Vidaurre (CHI) (XCO); Daniela Campuzano (MEX) (XCO); Gerardo Ulloa (MEX) (XCC); Hannah Otto (USA) (XCC)	Riley Amos (USA) (XCO); Hannah Otto (USA) (XCO); Riley Amos (USA) (XCC); Haley Smith (CAN) (XCC)	
25–26 February	Shimano Super Cup Massi XCO	(Spain) Banyoles	HC	Alan Hatherly (RSA); Haley Batten (USA)	Luca Schwarzbauer (GER); Mona Mitterwallner (AUT)	Titouan Carod (FRA); Evie Richards (GBR)	
25–26 February	1ª Taça de Portugal DHI C1 – Downhill de Tarouca	(Portugal) Tarouca	1	Jordan Williams (GBR); Valentina Höll (AUT)	Rémi Thirion (FRA); Veronika Widmann (ITA)	Rónán Dunne (IRL); Mikayla Parton (GBR)	
25–26 February	1º Fecha International de XCO XCC UCI Clase II Comodoro Rivadavia 2023	(Argentina) Comodoro Rivadavia	2	Fernando Contreras (ARG) (XCO); Inés Gutiérrez (ARG) (XCO); Fernando Contreras (ARG) (XCC); Inés Gutiérrez (ARG) (XCC)	Agustín Durán (ARG) (XCO); Juana Hernández Carnicero (ARG) (XCO); Agustín Durán (ARG) (XCC); Juana Hernández Carnicero (ARG) (XCC)	Aaron Pintos (ARG) (XCO); Pilar Adoue (ARG) (XCO); Aaron Pintos (ARG) (XCC); Pilar Adoue (ARG) (XCC)	
26 February	Greek MTB Series – Salamina Epic Race #3	(Greece) Salamis	1	Jens Schuermans (BEL); Emeline Detilleux (BEL)	Maxime Marotte (FRA); Greta Seiwald (ITA)	Gil Ly Gonen (ISR); Sophie von Berswordt (NED)	
26 February	Lythrodontas MTB Race	(Cyprus) Lythrodontas	3	Georgios Kouzis (CYP); Constantina Georgiou (CYP)	Constantinos Thymides (CYP); Styliana Kamilari (CYP)	Christos Philokyprou (CYP); Ekaterina Kovalchuk	
27 February – 4 March	Andalucia Bike Race	(Spain) Jaén	SHC	Fabian Rabensteiner (ITA); Wout Alleman (BEL); Kataržina Sosna (LTU); Irina Lützelschwab (SUI)	Enrique Morcillo (ESP); Hugo Drechou (FRA); Lejla Njemčević (BIH); Stefanie Dohrn (GER)	Francesco Failli (ITA); Riccardo Chiarini (ITA); Meritxell Figueras (ESP); Janina Wüst (SUI)	

=== March ===
Date	Race Name	Location	Class	Winner	Second	Third	Ref
1 March	Greek MTB Series – Salamina Epic Race #4	(Greece) Salamis	1	Andri Frischknecht (SUI); Emeline Detilleux (BEL)	Oleksandr Hudyma (UKR); Greta Seiwald (ITA)	Max Foidl (AUT); Lotte Koopmans (NED)	
1–2 March	2023 Thailand Mountain Bike Cup 1	(Thailand) Phichit	1	Caleb Bottcher (NZL); Sayu Bella Sukma Dewi (INA)	Zaenal Fanani (INA); Ya Yu Tsai (TPE)	Feri Yudoyono (INA); Yonthanan Phonkla (THA)	
2–5 March	Luxliner Route 66 MTB Experience – XCMS	(South Africa) Magaliesburg	S2	Shaun-Nick Bester (RSA)	Frans Claes (BEL)	Tlotlo Selala (RSA)	
4 March	Greek MTB Series – Salamina Epic Race #6	(Greece) Salamis	HC	Andri Frischknecht (SUI); Emeline Detilleux (BEL)	Gil Ly Gonen (ISR); Savilia Blunk (USA)	Max Foidl (AUT); Lotte Koopmans (NED)	
4 March	AusCycling MTB National Series #3	(Australia) Gold Coast	2	Sam Fox (AUS); Katherine Hosking (AUS)	Cameron Wright (AUS); Holly Lubcke (AUS)	Brent Rees (AUS); Hayley Oakes (AUS)	
4 March 2023	Gran Premio Internacional Candeleda – Gredos – XCC	(Spain) Candeleda	3	David Campos Motos (ESP); Lucía Gómez (ESP)	Ismael Esteban Agüero (ESP); Janika Lõiv (EST)	Alberto Mingorance (ESP); Matylda Szczecińska (POL)	
4 March 2023	Medellín Cerro Abajo	(Colombia) Medellín	3	Juan Fernando Vélez (COL)	Sebastián Holguín (COL)	Lucas Borba (BRA)	
4–5 March	Taça Brasil Copa Soul Sul Mineiro Internacional XCO-XCC	(Brazil) Lavras	1	Henrique Avancini (BRA) (XCO); Raiza Goulão (BRA) (XCO); Henrique Avancini (BRA) (XCC); Raiza Goulão (BRA) (XCC)	José Gabriel Marques (BRA) (XCO); Karen Olímpio (BRA) (XCO); Gustavo Xavier Oliveira (BRA) (XCC); Karen Olímpio (BRA) (XCC)	Guilherme Müller (BRA) (XCO); Isabella Lacerda (BRA) (XCO); Luiz Cocuzzi (BRA) (XCC); Leticia Cândido (BRA) (XCC)	
4–5 March	1ª Taça de Portugal XCO – Melgaço International XCO	(Portugal) Melgaço	NC/1	Mário Costa (POR); Raquel Queirós (POR)	Clement Izquierdo (FRA); Constance Valentin (FRA)	Chris Dawson (IRL); Ana Santos (POR)	
4–5 March	Puerto Rico MTB Cup	(Puerto Rico) Rincón	1	Martín Vidaurre (CHI); Gwendalyn Gibson (USA)	Gerardo Ulloa (MEX); Daniela Campuzano (MEX)	Georwill Pérez (PUR); Hercília Najara (BRA)	
4–5 March	Abierto Argentino de XCO XCC UCI Clase II 2023 #1	(Argentina) Esquel	2	Fernando Contreras (ARG) (XCO); Inés Gutiérrez (ARG) (XCO); Agustín Durán (ARG) (XCC); Inés Gutiérrez (ARG) (XCC)	Agustín Durán (ARG) (XCO); Julieta Benedetti (ARG) (XCO); Fernando Contreras (ARG) (XCC); Juana Carnicero (ARG) (XCC)	Jorge Macias (ARG); Juana Carnicero (ARG) (XCO); Joaquín Vera (ARG) (XCC); Pilar Adoue (ARG)	
4–5 March	International Chile Cup Tumbes	(Chile) Tumbes	2	Ignacio Gallo (CHI); Yarela González (CHI)	Nicolás Delich (CHI); Maria Moreno (CHI)	Sebastián Maldonado (CHI); Pilar Corvalán (CHI)	
5 March	VTT Chabrières 2023	(France) Guéret	1	Jens Schuermans (BEL); Noémie Garnier (FRA)	Maxime Loret (FRA); Juliette Trombini (FRA)	Thibault Daniel (FRA); Letizia Marzani (ITA)	
5 March	Greek MTB Series – Salamina Epic Race #5	(Greece) Salamis	1	Andri Frischknecht (SUI); Savilia Blunk (USA)	Max Foidl (AUT); Greta Seiwald (ITA)	Charlie Aldridge (GBR); Leonie Daubermann (GER)	
5 March	AusCycling MTB National Series #4	(Australia) Gold Coast	NC/2	Brent Rees (AUS); Zoe Cuthbert (AUS)	Cameron Wright (AUS); Katherine Hosking (AUS)	Joel Dodds (AUS); Holly Lubcke (AUS)	
5 March	Verona MTB International	(Italy) Verona	2	Nadir Colledani (ITA); Chiara Teocchi (ITA)	Luca Braidot (ITA); Tamara Wiedmann (AUT)	Mario Bair (AUT); Emilly Johnston (CAN)	
5 March	Gran Premio Internacional Candeleda – Gredos – Round #1 Spanish Cup	(Spain) Candeleda	1/NC	David Campos Motos (ESP); Janika Lõiv (EST)	Alberto Barroso (ESP); Natalia Fischer (ESP)	Luis Pérez Martínez (ESP); Rocío del Alba García (ESP)	
9 March	Greek MTB Series – Sparta MTB Race #1	(Greece) Sparta	1	Oliver Sølvhøj (DEN); Emeline Detilleux (BEL)	Gil Ly Gonen (ISR); Yana Belomoyna (UKR)	Gustav Pedersen (DEN); Vita Movrin (SVN)	
10 March	Integração Cup Internacional #1	(Brazil) Petrópolis	2	Luiz Cocuzzi (BRA); Raiza Goulão (BRA)	Ulan Bastos Galinski (BRA); Karen Olímpio (BRA)	Henrique Avancini (BRA); Letícia Cândido (BRA)	
10–11 March	Internazionali Crosscountry Coppa Citta Di Albenga	(Italy) Albenga	1	Pierre de Froidmont (BEL); Martina Berta (ITA)	Thomas Griot (FRA); Giada Specia (ITA)	Sebastian Fini (DEN); Anne Tauber (NED)	
11 March	Integração Cup Internacional #2	(Brazil) Petrópolis	3	José Gabriel Marques (BRA); Karen Olímpio (BRA)	Ulan Galinski (BRA); Letícia Cândido (BRA)	Henrique Avancini (BRA); Hercilia Najara (BRA)	
11–12 March	Greek MTB Series – Sparta MTB Race #1	(Greece) Sparta	HC	Oliver Sølvhøj (DEN); Emeline Detilleux (BEL)	Emil Eid (NOR); Yana Belomoyna (UKR)	Gil Ly Gonen (ISR); Vita Movrin (SVN)	
11–12 March	Fullgaz Race powered by Ghost int. MTB Bundesliga	(Germany) Obergessertshausen	1	Luca Schwarzbauer (GER) (XCO); Anne Terpstra (NED) (XCO); Georg Egger (GER) (XCC); Lia Schrievers (GER) (XCC)	David List (GER) (XCO); Nina Benz (GER) (XCO); Julian Schelb (GER) (XCC); Ronja Eibl (GER) (XCC)	Georg Egger (GER) (XCO); Ronja Eibl (GER) (XCO); David List (GER) (XCC); Nina Benz (GER) (XCC)	
12 March 2023	Desafio dos Gigantes	(Brazil) Petrópolis	1	Luiz Cocuzzi (BRA); Raiza Goulão (BRA)	Henrique Avancini (BRA); Karen Olímpio (BRA)	Alex Malacarne (BRA); Sabrina Oliveira (BRA)	
12 March 2023	Gran Premio Ciudad de Valladolid BTT XCO – Spanish Cup Round #2	(Spain) Valladolid	2/NC	Jofre Cullell (ESP); Natalia Fischer (ESP)	David Valero (ESP); Núria Bosch (ESP)	Pablo Rodríguez (ESP); Estíbaliz Sagardoy (ESP)	
17 March	Israel Cup #4	(Israel) Qula	2	Eitan Levi (ISR); Na'ama Noyman (ISR)	Yotam Deshe (ISR); Naomi Luria (ISR)	Luuk Chambeyron (FRA); Romi Veldnizki (ISR)	
17–19 March	Crankworx Rotorua Downhill	(New Zealand) Rotorua	1	Loïc Bruni (FRA); Jess Blewitt (NZL)	Oliver Zwar (SWE); Jenna Hastings (NZL)	Neko Mulally (USA); Shania Rawson (NZL)	
18 March	Hellenic XCC Series #2	(Greece) Peloponnese	3	Michał Topór (POL); Eleftheria Giachou (GRE)	Alexandros Athanasiadis (GRE); Alexandra Adam (GRE)	Dimitrios Antoniadis (GRE); Efcharis Moschovoudi (GRE)	
18–19 March	Swiss Bike Cup Gränichen	(Switzerland) Gränichen	HC	Luca Schwarzbauer (GER); Alessandra Keller (SUI)	Mathias Flückiger (SUI); Nicole Koller (SUI)	Jordan Sarrou (FRA); Jolanda Neff (SUI)	
18–19 March	Pineta Sperane XCO – #1 Internazionali d'Italia	(Italy) San Zeno di Montagna	1	Luca Braidot (ITA); Martina Berta (ITA)	Nadir Colledani (ITA); Mona Mitterwallner (AUT)	Daniele Braidot (ITA); Giorgia Marchet (ITA)	
18–19 March	Copa Internacional METAN	(Argentina) San José de Metán	2	Álvaro Macías (ARG); Agustina Apaza (ARG)	Martín Molina (ARG); Mariana Casadey (ARG)	Facundo Cayata (ARG); Florencia Ávila (ARG)	
18–19 March	Portugal Cup DHI	(Portugal) Seia	2	Gonçalo Bandeira (POR); Zoe Zamora (ESP)	Oisin O'Callaghan (IRL); Margarida Bandeira (POR)	Tomás Barreiros (POR); Kira Zamora (ESP)	
18–19 March	Copa Mezuena Specialized V1	(Colombia) Chía	3	Hugo Rodríguez (COL); Natalia Duarte (COL)	Hilvar Malaver (COL); Cristina Cañaveral (COL)	Johan Cañaveral (COL)	
19 March	2023 Oceania XCO & E-MTB XCO Continental Championships	Australia	CC	Anton Cooper (NZL) (XCO); Rebecca Henderson (AUS) (XCO)	Ben Oliver (NZL) (XCO); Sammie Maxwell (NZL) (XCO)	Cameron Ivory (AUS) (XCO); Zoe Cuthbert (AUS) (XCO)	
19 March	Superprestigio MTB Ancín	(Spain) Ancín	1	David Campos Motos (ESP); Janika Lõiv (EST)	Vlad Dascălu (ROU); Raquel Queirós (POR)	Ricardo Marinheiro (POR); Natalia Fischer (ESP)	
19 March	Hellenic Cup #2	(Greece) Peloponnese	2	Dimitrios Antoniadis (GRE); Eleftheria Giachou (GRE)	Michał Topór (POL); Eirini Karousou (GRE)	Alexandros Athanasiadis (GRE); Alexandra Adam (GRE)	
19–26 March	Absa Cape Epic – XCMS	(South Africa) Cape Town	SHC	Matthew Beers (RSA); Christopher Blevins (USA); Kimberley Le Court (MRI); Vera Looser (NAM)	Georg Egger (GER); Lukas Baum (GER); Amy Wakefield (RSA); Candice Lill (RSA)	Nino Schurter (SUI); Andri Frischknecht (SUI); Sofía Gómez (ARG); Kateřina Nash (CZE)	
24 March	Serbia Epic Series #1 – Yason Creative District	(Serbia) Novi Sad	3	Zsombor Palumby (HUN); Eva Lechner (ITA)	Christopher Dawson (IRL); Mariia Sukhopalova (UKR)	Gioele Bertolini (ITA); Alina Sarkulova (KAZ)	
24 March	Tennessee National XCC	(United States) Oliver Springs	3	Cole Punchard (CAN); Madison Maloney (USA)	Owen Clark (CAN); Nicole Bradbury (CAN)	Tyler Orschel (CAN); Paige Edwards (USA)	
24–26 March	MTB French Cup XCO/XCE	(France) Marseille	HC	Jordan Sarrou (FRA) (XCO); Loana Lecomte (FRA) (XCO); Titouan Perrin-Ganier (FRA) (XCE); Coline Clauzure (FRA) (XCE)	Sam Gaze (NZL) (XCO); Anne Tauber (NED) (XCO); Thibaut Kahlhoven (FRA) (XCE); Noémie Garnier (FRA) (XCE)	Thomas Griot (FRA) (XCO); Savilia Blunk (USA) (XCO); Lorenzo Serres (FRA) (XCE); Annemoon van Dienst (NED) (XCE)	
24–26 March	Internacional Estrada Real	(Brazil) Itabirito	1	José Gabriel Marques (BRA) (XCO); Raiza Goulão (BRA) (XCO); José Gabriel Marques (BRA) (XCC); Karen Olímpio (BRA) (XCC)	Ulan Galinski (BRA) (XCO); Karen Olímpio (BRA) (XCO); Ulan Galinski (BRA) (XCC); Isabella Lacerda (BRA) (XCC)	Guilherme Müller (BRA) (XCO); Isabella Lacerda (BRA) (XCO); Guilherme Müller (BRA) (XCC); Leticia Cândido (BRA) (XCC)	
25 March	Serbia Epic Series #2 – DJAK SPORT Andrevlje XCO #1	(Serbia) Novi Sad	1	Martin Haring (SVK); Eva Lechner (ITA)	Christopher Dawson (IRL); Mariia Sukhopalova (UKR)	Gregor Raggl (AUT); Alina Sarkulova (KAZ)	
25–26 March	Tennessee National E-MTB XCO/DHI/XCO	(United States) Oliver Springs	2/3	Cole Punchard (CAN) (XCO); Dakotah Norton (USA) (DHI); Madison Maloney (USA) (XCO); Kailey Skelton (USA) (DHI)	Tyler Orschel (CAN) (XCO); Aaron Gwin (USA) (DHI); Nicole Bradbury (CAN) (XCO); Frida Helena Rønning (NOR) (DHI)	Owen Clark (CAN) (XCO); Luca Shaw (USA) (DHI); Kiara Lylyk (CAN) (XCO); Gracey Hemstreet (CAN) (DHI)	
25–26 March	Memorial Bruno Alverà International XCO 2023	(Italy) Pergine Valsugana	2	Filippo Fontana (ITA); Chiara Teocchi (ITA)	Alessio Agostinelli (ITA); Tamara Wiedmann (AUT)	Emanuele Huez (ITA); Astrid Miola (ITA)	
26 March	31. KTM Kamptal Trophy	(Austria) Langenlois	1	Jens Schuermans (BEL); Laura Stigger (AUT)	Ondřej Cink (CZE); Aleksandra Podgórska (POL)	Bartłomiej Wawak (POL); Jitka Čábelická (CZE)	
26 March	British Cycling National Cross Country Series Round 1	(United Kingdom) Tong	2	Cameron Mason (GBR); Anna McGorum (GBR)	Corran Carrick-Anderson (GBR); Elena McGorum (GBR)	Huw Buck Jones (GBR); Amy Henchoz (GBR)	
26 March	Serbia Epic Series #3 – DJAK SPORT Andrevlje XCO #2	(Serbia) Novi Sad	1	Christopher Dawson (IRL); Eva Lechner (ITA)	Gregor Raggl (AUT); Lucia Bramati (ITA)	Zsombor Palumby (HUN); Mariia Sukhopalova (UKR)	
26 March	XCO Vrtojba 2023	(Slovenia) Vrtojba	1	Nadir Colledani (ITA); Yana Belomoyna (UKR)	Luca Braidot (ITA); Tanja Žakelj (SVN)	Daniele Braidot (ITA); Vita Movrin (SVN)	
26 March 2023	Copa España XCO Cofidis G.P. X-Sauce – Round #3	(Spain) Alpedrete	2/NC	Ricardo Marinheiro (POR); Raquel Queirós (POR)	Cristofer Bosque (ESP); Ana Santos (POR)	Alberto Barroso (ESP); Lucia Gómez (ESP)	
26 March	Copa Catalana Internacional BTT- Gavà	(Spain) Gavà	2	Jofre Cullell (ESP); Janika Lõiv (EST)	Mario Sinués (ESP); Karla Štěpánová (CZE)	Roger Ferrer (ESP); Núria Bosch (ESP)	
26 March	ÖKK BIKE REVOLUTION Tamaro Trophy	(Switzerland) Riviera	1	Mathias Flückiger (SUI); Martina Berta (ITA)	Vital Albin (SUI); Sina Frei (SUI)	Luca Schätti (SUI); Nicole Koller (SUI)	
31 March–2 April	Copa Colombia MTB II	(Colombia) Turbaco	2	Jhonnatan Botero (COL) (XCO); María José Salamanca (COL) (XCO); Juan Fernando Monroy (COL) (XCC); María José Salamanca (COL) (XCC)	Juan Fernando Monroy (COL) (XCO); Camila Cagua González (COL) (XCO); Fabio Castañeda (COL) (XCC); Camila Cagua González (COL) (XCC)	Fabio Castañeda (COL) (XCO); Ana Maria Roa (COL) (XCO); Jhonnatan Botero (COL) (XCC); Ana Maria Roa (COL) (XCC)	

=== April ===
Date	Race Name	Location	Class	Winner	Second	Third	Ref
1 April	XCO Premantura Rocky Trails	(Croatia) Pula/Premantura	1	Maxime Loret (FRA); Zuzanna Krzystała (POL)	Sven Strähle (GER); Tanja Žakelj (SVN)	Mirko Tabacchi (ITA); Vita Movrin (SVN)	
1–2 April	Marlene Südtirol Sunshine Race 2023	(Italy) Nals	HC	Joshua Dubau (FRA); Giada Specia (ITA)	Nadir Colledani (ITA); Chiara Teocchi (ITA)	Simone Avondetto (ITA); Anne Tauber (NED)	
1–2 April	Portugal CUP XCO – Abrantes	(Portugal) Abrantes	2	Ricardo Marinheiro (POR); Ana Santos (POR)	Mário Costa (POR); Lara Lois (ESP)	Saúl López (ESP); Joana Monteiro (POR)	
1–2 April	Czech MTB Cup	(Czech Republic) Kutná Hora	1	Matej Ulík (SVK); Jana Czeczinkarová (CZE)	Krzysztof Łukasik (POL); Tereza Tvarůžková (CZE)	Alex Bregenzer (GER); Helena Erbenová (CZE)	
2 April	US Pro Cup	(United States) Temecula	1	Riley Amos (USA); Haley Batten (USA)	Bradyn Lange (USA); Gwendalyn Gibson (USA)	Carter Woods (CAN); Kate Courtney (USA)	
2 April	Argovia Vittoria-Fischer Cup: Hochdorf	(Switzerland) Hochdorf	C3	Nick Bürki (SUI); Paula Gorycka (POL)	Yannis Musy (FRA); Chrystelle Baumann (SUI)	Joris Ryf (SUI); Cristel Hubacher (SUI)	
2 April	Copa Catalana Internacional BTT- Corró d'Amunt	(Spain) Corró d'Amunt	2	Marek Rauchfuss (CZE); Constance Valentin (FRA)	Ever Alejandro Gómez (BOL); Karla Štěpánová (CZE)	Jofre Cullell (ESP); Núria Bosch (ESP)	
2 April 2023	Copa de España XCO Cofidis G. P. Zaragoza – Round #4	(Spain) Zaragoza	2/NC	Felipe Orts (ESP); Janika Lõiv (EST)	Alberto Barroso (ESP); Natalia Fischer (ESP)	Cristofer Bosque (ESP); Estíbaliz Sagardoy (ESP)	
2 April 2023	Expreso Sapucai XCM	(Paraguay) Sapucaí	2	Esteban Portillo (PAR); Silvia Rodas (PAR)	Lucas Bogado (PAR); Sara Maria Torres (PAR)	Adhemar Oberladstätter (PAR); Cristina Mabel Aguilera (PAR)	
6–9 April	Volcat Igualada	(Spain) Igualada	S1	Hans Becking (NED); Janina Wüst (SUI)	Nicolas Samparisi (ITA); Karla Štěpánová (CZE)	Riccardo Chiarini (ITA); Terese Andersson (SWE)	
7–8 April	2# Internazionali d'Italia Series – Capoliveri Legend XCO	(Italy) Capoliveri	HC	Nino Schurter (SUI); Nicole Koller (SUI)	Titouan Carod (FRA); Martina Berta (ITA)	Simone Avondetto (ITA); Giada Specia (ITA)	
9 April	3 Nations Cup: Zwiep Scott Cup – XCO	(Netherlands) Oldenzaal	2	Jarne Vandersteen (BEL); Rosa van Doorn (NED)	Morris Gruiters (NED); Sara Öberg (SWE)	Frits Biesterbos (NED); Romana Carfora (NED)	
9 April	Copa Internacional Mendoza	(Argentina) Mendoza	2	Ignacio Gallo (CHI); Guadalupe Suárez (ARG)	Jorge Álvaro Macías (ARG); Costanza Pezzotti (ARG)	Tomás Vargas (ARG); Lucía Cabrera Pipke (ARG)	
12 April	US Pro Cup XCO	(United States) Fayetteville	1	Christopher Blevins (USA); Kate Courtney (USA)	Riley Amos (USA); Savilia Blunk (USA)	Carter Woods (CAN); Jennifer Jackson (CAN)	
14 April	CIMTB Araxá 20 Years: XCC Class 3	(Brazil) Araxá	3	Martín Vidaurre (CHI); Raiza Goulão (BRA)	José Gabriel Marques (BRA); Agustina María Apaza (ARG)	Henrique Avancini (BRA); Isabella Lacerda (BRA)	
14 April	Israel Cup	(Israel) Ben Shemen	2	Gil Ly Gonen (ISR); Naomi Luria (ISR)	Eitan Levi (ISR); Romi Veldnizki (ISR)	Tomer Zaltsman (ISR)	
14 April	US Pro Cup XCC	(United States) Fayetteville	1	Riley Amos (USA); Kate Courtney (USA)	Carter Woods (CAN); Savilia Blunk (USA)	Adair Gutiérrez (MEX); Gwendalyn Gibson (USA)	
14–16 April	iXS European Downhill Cup	(Croatia) Veli Lošinj	1	Adam Rojček (SVK); Léona Pierrini (FRA)	Luka Berginc (SVN); Delphine Bulliard (SUI)	Lutz Weber (SUI); Justine Welzel (GER)	
15 April 2023	US Pro Cup XCO	(United States) Fayetteville	HC	Christopher Blevins (USA); Savilia Blunk (USA)	Carter Woods (CAN); Gwendalyn Gibson (USA)	Riley Amos (USA); Kate Courtney (USA)	
15 April 2023	Jamon Bike – Round #1 2023 Spanish National Cup XCM	(Spain) Calamocha	C2/NC	Simon Stiebjahn (GER); Tessa Kortekaas (NED)	Jakob Hartmann (GER); Cristina Morán Roza (ESP)	Roberto Bou Martín (ESP); Pilar Fernández (ESP)	
15 April	CIMTB Araxá 20 Years: XCO Class 1	(Brazil) Araxá	1	Henrique Avancini (BRA); Karen Olímpio (BRA)	José Gabriel Marques (BRA); Isabella Lacerda (BRA)	Gustavo Xavier de Oliveira (BRA); Agustina María Apaza (ARG)	
15 April	Petrovaradin Fortress MTB Cup 2023 #1 – Serbian Epic Series #3	(Serbia) Novi Sad	1	Bartłomiej Wawak (POL); Lucia Bramati (ITA)	Zsombor Palumby (HUN); Eva Lechner (ITA)	Dmytro Titarenko (UKR); Alina Sarkulova (KAZ)	
15 April	MTB Caneva Trophy	(Italy) Stevenà	2	Filippo Fontana (ITA); Giorgia Marchet (ITA)	Andreas Emanuele Vittone (ITA); Astrid Miola (ITA)	Gioele Bertolini (ITA); Marta Zanga (ITA)	
15–16 April	2023 Oceania DHI Continental Championships	Australia	CC	Sam Hill (AUS); Lia Ladbrook (AUS)	Oliver Davis (AUS); Cassie Voysey (AUS)	Daniel Booker (AUS); Sacha Mills (AUS)	
15–16 April	Ötztaler Mountainbike Festival	(Austria) Haiming	HC	Ondřej Cink (CZE); Laura Stigger (AUT)	David List (GER); Jolanda Neff (SUI)	Sebastian Fini Carstensen (DEN); Linda Indergand (SUI)	
15–16 April	CIC On – Swiss Bike Cup	(Liechtenstein) Schaan	C1	Mathias Flückiger (SUI); Alessandra Keller (SUI)	Lars Forster (SUI); Ginia Caluori (SUI)	Dario Lillo (SUI); Monique Halter (SUI)	
16 April	Petrovaradin Fortress MTB Cup 2023 #2 – Serbian Epic Series #4	(Serbia) Novi Sad	1	Bartłomiej Wawak (POL); Eva Lechner (ITA)	Sondre Rokke (NOR); Alina Sarkulova (KAZ)	Silas Graf (GER); Lucia Bramati (ITA)	
15–16 April	Portugal Cup DHI	(Portugal) São Brás de Alportel	2	Jack Reading (GBR); Kira Zamora (ESP)	Tiago Ladeira (POR); Zoe Zamora (ESP)	Daniel Slack (GBR); Margarida Bandeira (POR)	
16 April	CIMTB Araxá 20 Years: XCO Hors Class	(Brazil) Araxá	HC	Martín Vidaurre (CHI); Raiza Goulão (BRA)	José Gabriel Marques (BRA); Karen Olímpio (BRA)	Gustavo Xavier de Oliveira (BRA); Isabella Lacerda (BRA)	
16 April	MTB Croatia Cup – Vodice	(Croatia) Vodice	1	Ethan Rose (NZL); Lejla Njemčević (BIH)	Alessio Agostinelli (ITA); Mia Cameron (NZL)	Rok Naglič (SVN); Csenge Anna Bokros (HUN)	
16 April	Turieckap XCO	(Slovakia) Turčianske Teplice	1	Filip Helta (POL); Jitka Čábelická (CZE)	Lukáš Kobes (CZE); Antonina Białek (POL)	Matěj Průdek (CZE); Klaudia Czabok (POL)	
16 April	Superprestigio MTB Arguedas	(Spain) Arguedas	1	Felipe Orts (ESP); Janika Lõiv (EST)	Pablo Rodríguez Guede (ESP); Estíbaliz Sagardoy (ESP)	Ismael Esteban Agüero (ESP); Blanca Vallès (ESP)	
16 April	British Cycling National Cross Country Series Round 2	(United Kingdom) Port Talbot	2	Joseph Blackmore (GBR); Evie Richards (GBR)	Cameron Mason (GBR); Ella Maclean-Howell (GBR)	Cameron Orr (GBR); Elena McGorum (GBR)	
18–22 April	Brasil Ride Espinhaço – XCMS	(Brazil) Conceição do Mato Dentro	S1	Luiz Miguel Honório (BRA); Marcella Toldi (BRA)	Tiago Ferreira (POR); Sabrina Koester (BRA)	Leandro Donizete (BRA); Luiza Euzébio (BRA)	
18–22 April	4 Islands Stage Race – XCMS	(Croatia) Baška/Rab/Merag/Lošinj	S1	Georg Egger (GER); Bettina Janas (GER)	Lukas Baum (GER); Kim Ames (GER)	Hugo Drechou (FRA); Alessia Nay (SUI)	
21 April	Čačalica Požarevac MTB XCC – Serbian Epic Series #5	(Serbia) Požarevac	3	Silas Graf (GER); Tatyana Geneleva (KAZ)	Filip Holub (CZE); Alina Sarkulova (KAZ)	Attila József Málnási (ROU); Eleftheria Giachou (GRE)	
22 April	XCO Drozdovo	(Slovakia) Nová Baňa	1	Bartłomiej Wawak (POL); Aleksandra Podgórska (POL)	Krzysztof Łukasik (POL); Klaudia Czabok (POL)	Filip Helta (POL); Matylda Szczecińska (POL)	
22 April	XIII BTT Masadas de Ejulve – XCM	(Spain) Ejulve	2	Simon Stiebjahn (GER); Pilar Fernández (ESP)	Sergio Mantecón (ESP); Paola Zahonero (ESP)	Pau Marzà (ESP); Gloria Medina (ESP)	
22 April	Čačalica Požarevac MTB XCO – Serbian Epic Series #6	(Serbia) Požarevac	2	Daniel van der Walt (RSA); Alina Sarkulova (KAZ)	Silas Graf (GER); Lucia Bramati (ITA)	Eric Weckerle (SUI); Eva Lechner (ITA)	
22–23 April	International MTB Bundesliga – Heubacher Mountainbikefestival Bike the Rock	(Germany) Heubach	HC	Joshua Dubau (FRA); Mona Mitterwallner (AUT)	Pierre de Froidmont (BEL); Haley Batten (USA)	Luca Schwarzbauer (GER); Sina Frei (SUI)	
23 April	Vigrestad Terrengsykkelfestival	(Norway) Vigrestad	1	Knut Røhme (NOR); Ingrid Bøe Jacobsen (NOR)	Eskil Evensen-Lie (NOR); Berit Nordsæter Resell (NOR)	Erik Hægstad (NOR); Sigrid Andrea Fløgstad (NOR)	
23 April	XVII BTT XCO de Vila Franca 2023	(Portugal) Vila Franca	1	Mathis Azzaro (FRA); Raquel Queirós (POR)	Pablo Rodríguez (ESP); Ana Santos (POR)	Valentin Remondet (FRA); Joana Monteiro (POR)	
23 April	XX MTB Rusza Peleton Puchar Polski Eliminacjedo OOM MTB	(Poland) Ogrodniczki	3	Szymon Pomian (POL); Antonina Białek (POL)	Maciej Jeziorski (POL); Zuzanna Krzystała (POL)	Piotr Kryński (POL); Kinga Żur (POL)	
23 April	Salcano Turkish-Serbian Friendship MTB Cup – Serbian Epic Series #7	(Serbia) Belgrade	1	Daniel van der Walt (RSA); Lucia Bramati (ITA)	Silas Graf (GER); Alina Sarkulova (KAZ)	Denis Sergiyenko (KAZ); Eva Lechner (ITA)	
23 April	Shimano Super Cup Massi Baza	(Spain) Baza	2	David Domingo Campos (ESP); Rebecca Henderson (AUS)	David Valero (ESP); Annie Last (GBR)	Alberto Barroso (ESP); Janika Lõiv (EST)	
26 April	2023 Pan-American XCR Continental Championships	Brazil	CC	Canada (CAN); Carter Woods; Gunnar Holmgren; Sandra Walter; Jocelyn Stel; Marin Lowe; Maxime St-Onge	Brazil (BRA); Gustavo Xavier; Otávio Queiroz de Souza; Giuliana Salvini; Gabriela Ferolla; Raiza Goulão; José Gabriel Marques	Mexico (MEX); Gerardo Ulloa; Iván Aguilar Villegas; Daniela Campuzano; María Flores García; Cinthya Martín; Luciano Esquivias	
27 April	2023 Pan-American XCE Continental Championships	Brazil	CC	Mário Couto Grego Santos (BRA); Iara Caetano (BRA)	Nicolas Machado (BRA); Marcela Lima (BRA)	Brandon Guerrero (COL); Aline Simões (BRA)	
28 April	2023 Pan-American XCC Continental Championships	Brazil	CC	Gerardo Ulloa (MEX); Kate Courtney (USA)	Martín Vidaurre (CHI); Raiza Goulão (BRA)	Gunnar Holmgren (CAN); Kelsey Urban (USA)	
28 April	Israel Cup	(Israel) Shefa-Amr	2	Eitan Levi (ISR); Naomi Luria (ISR)	Tomer Caspi (ISR)	Nir Tchwella (ISR)	
28–29 April	Namibia XC1	(Namibia) Windhoek	1	Alex Miller (NAM); Candice Lill (RSA)	Philip Buys (RSA); Tyler Jacobs (RSA)	Johann van Zyl (RSA); Monique du Plessis (NAM)	
28–30 April	MTB French Cup – XCO/XCC	(France) Guéret	HC	Sam Gaze (NZL) (XCO); Pauline Ferrand-Prévot (FRA) (XCO); Sam Gaze (NZL) (XCC); Annie Last (GBR) (XCC)	Joshua Dubau (FRA) (XCO); Léna Gérault (FRA) (XCO); Thomas Litscher (SUI) (XCC); Hélène Clauzel (FRA) (XCC)	Antoine Philipp (FRA) (XCO); Annie Last (GBR) (XCO); Tom Pidcock (GBR) (XCC); Noémie Garnier (FRA) (XCC)	
29 April	2023 Pan-American XCO Continental Championships	Brazil	CC	Gerardo Ulloa (MEX); Kate Courtney (USA)	Gunnar Holmgren (CAN); Kelsey Urban (USA)	Fernando Contreras (ARG); Raiza Goulão (BRA)	
29 April	Marathon Cup BTT Cambrils	(Spain) Cambrils	2	Ever Alejandro Gómez (BOL); Clàudia Galicia (ESP)	Eric Gil Alegre (ESP); Lourdes Cayetano (ESP)	Francesc Guerra (ESP); Sonia Quiroga (BOL)	
29 April	Klippingracet	(Sweden) Säter	2	André Eriksson (SWE); Linn Gustafzzon (SWE)	Viktor Lindqvist (SWE); Sara Öberg (SWE)	Jakob Söderqvist (SWE); Tilda Hylén (SWE)	
29 April	Garda TrentiIno Bike Marathon – XCM	(Italy) Riva del Garda	1	Héctor Leonardo Páez (COL); Adelheid Morath (GER)	Marc Stutzmann (SUI); Janina Wüst (SUI)	Andreas Seewald (GER); Kataržina Sosna (LTU)	
29 April	Piney Hills Classic	(United States) Ruston	2	Dane Grey (USA); Holly Lavesser (USA)	Cayden Parker (USA); Samantha Campbell (USA)	Noah Warren (USA); Isabella Robles (USA)	
29 April	Hellenic XCE Series #1	(Greece) Attica	3	Alexandros Karousos (GRE); Eleftheria Giachou (GRE)	Dimitrios Antoniadis (GRE); Athina Tzoulaki (GRE)	Iraklis Balafas (GRE); Eirini Maria Karousou (GRE)	
29–30 April	2023 Pan-American EDR Continental Championships	Costa Rica	CC	Álvaro Hidalgo (CRC); Melisa Avila Miller (CRC); Jan Xirinachs (CRC) (E-EDR); Shaira Abreu Concepción (DOM) (E-EDR)	Guillermo Cervantes Cortés (MEX); Natalia Acevez Díaz (MEX); Jhonny Flores Mora (CRC) (E-EDR)	Bayron González (CRC); Julia Lasso Eguiguren (ECU); Isaac Flores Mora (CRC) (E-EDR)	
29–30 April	Petrich DHI	(Bulgaria) Petrich	1	Chris Cumming (IRL)	Felix Bauer (GER)	Hannes Alber (ITA)	
29–30 April	Czech MTB Cup	(Czech Republic) Město Touškov	1	Ondřej Cink (CZE); Anne Terpstra (NED)	Finn Treudler (SUI); Jitka Čábelická (CZE)	Tomer Zaltsman (ISR); Adéla Holubová (CZE)	
29–30 April	3# Internazionali D’Italia Series – Santoporo XC	(Italy) Esanatoglia	1	Luca Braidot (ITA); Sofie Heby Pedersen (DEN)	Simone Avondetto (ITA); Martina Berta (ITA)	Daniele Braidot (ITA); Giada Specia (ITA)	
29–30 April	Portugal Cup XCO – Lousada International XCO	(Portugal) Lousada	1	Pablo Rodríguez (ESP); Raquel Queirós (POR)	Ricardo Marinheiro (POR); Matylda Szczecińska (POL)	Mário Costa (POR); Ana Santos (POR)	
30 April	Roc d'Ardenne – XCM	(Belgium) Houffalize	1	Wout Alleman (BEL); Stefanie Dohrn (GER)	Simon Stiebjahn (GER); Estelle Morel (FRA)	Jakob Hartmann (GER); Irina Lützelschwab (SUI)	
30 April	Shimano MTB Liga #1 Randers	(Denmark) Randers	1	Tobias Lillelund (DEN); Caroline Bohé (DEN)	Gustav Pedersen (DEN); Line Mygdam (DEN)	Oliver Sølvhøj (DEN); Ingrid Bøe Jacobsen (NOR)	
30 April	Gran Premio Sabiñánigo	(Spain) Sabiñánigo	1	Jofre Cullell (ESP); Rebecca Henderson (AUS)	Alberto Barroso (ESP); Rocío del Alba García (ESP)	Francesc Barber (ESP); Natalia Fischer (ESP)	
30 April	Hellenic Cup #3	(Greece) Attica	2	Dimitrios Antoniadis (GRE); Eleftheria Giachou (GRE)	Alexandros Athanasiadis (GRE); Aikaterini Eleftheriadou (GRE)	Yaroslav Shvedov; Eirini Maria Karousou (GRE)	
30 April	3 Nations Cup: Vamberg Cup	(Netherlands) Wijster	2	Rens Teunissen van Manen (NED); Puck Pieterse (NED)	Clement Horny (BEL); Lotte Koopmans (NED)	David Nordemann (NED); Rosa van Doorn (NED)	
30 April – 1 May	Grazer Bike-Opening Stattegg	(Austria) Graz	1	Max Foidl (AUT); Laura Stigger (AUT)	Mario Bair (AUT); Tamara Wiedmann (AUT)	Matthew Wilson (NZL); Greta Seiwald (ITA)	

=== May ===
Date	Race Name	Location	Class	Winner	Second	Third	Ref
5–6 May	Rye bike festival / Rye terrengsykkelfestival – XCO/XCC	(Norway) Oslo	3	Knut Røhme (NOR) (XCO); Linn Gustafzzon (SWE) (XCO); Knut Røhme (NOR) (XCC); Linn Gustafzzon (SWE) (XCC)	Martin E. Farstadvoll (NOR) (XCO); Line Mygdam (DEN) (XCO); Simon Andreassen (DEN) (XCC); Line Mygdam (DEN) (XCC)	Erik Hægstad (NOR) (XCO); Malene Degn (DEN) (XCO); Sondre Rokke (NOR) (XCC); Oda LaForce (NOR) (XCC)	
5–7 May	Watersley XCO Challenge	(Netherlands) Sittard	1	Pierre de Froidmont (BEL) (XCO); Anne Tauber (NED) (XCO); Pierre de Froidmont (BEL) (XCC) (XCC)	Mārtiņš Blūms (LVA) (XCO); Puck Pieterse (NED) (XCO); Arne Janssens (BEL) (XCC) (XCC)	Clement Horny (BEL) (XCO); Fem van Empel (NED) (XCO); Frits Biesterbos (NED) (XCC) (XCC)	
6 May	Capoliveri Legend Cup – XCM	(Italy) Capoliveri	HC	Martin Stošek (CZE); Costanza Fasolis (ITA)	Fabian Rabensteiner (ITA); Valentina Garattini (ITA)	Wout Alleman (BEL); Valentina Picca (ITA)	
6–7 May	Downhill De Boticas – Portugal Cup DHI	(Portugal) Boticas	1	Gonçalo Bandeira (POR); Valentina Roa (COL)	Tyler Ervin (USA); Zoe Zamora (ESP)	Ian Guionnet (FRA); Kira Zamora (ESP)	
6–7 May	National Downhill Series – Round 2	(United Kingdom) Fort William	1	Laurie Greenland (GBR); Nina Hoffmann (GER)	Matt Walker (GBR); Camille Balanche (SUI)	Charlie Hatton (GBR); Monika Hrastnik (SVN)	
6–8 May	Cycling at the 2023 Southeast Asian Games	(Cambodia) Siem Reap	JR	Feri Yudoyono (INA) (XCO); Sayu Bella Sukma Dewi (INA) (XCO); Methasit Boonsane (THA) (XCE); Dara Latifah (INA) (XCE)	Zaenal Fanani (INA) (XCO); Nur Assyira Zainal Abidin (MAS) (XCO); Khim Menglong (CAM) (XCE); Ariana Evangelista (PHI) (XCE)	Ihza Muhammad (INA) (XCO); Yonthanan Phonkla (THA) (XCO); Ihza Muhammad (INA) (XCE); Warinthorn Phetpraphan (THA) (XCE)	
7 May	British Cycling National Cross Country Series Round 3	(United Kingdom) Winchester	2	Charlie Aldridge (GBR); Ella Maclean-Howell (GBR)	Joseph Blackmore (GBR); Isla Short (GBR)	Grant Ferguson (GBR); Anna McGorum (GBR)	
7 May	ÖKK Bike Revolution Chur	(Switzerland) Chur	HC	Tom Pidcock (GBR); Evie Richards (GBR)	Mathias Flückiger (SUI); Pauline Ferrand-Prévot (FRA)	Nino Schurter (SUI); Sina Frei (SUI)	
7 May	Rye bike festival / Rye terrengsykkelfestival – XCO	(Norway) Oslo	1	Knut Røhme (NOR); Malene Degn (DEN)	Simon Andreassen (DEN); Linn Gustafzzon (SWE)	Mats Tubaas Glende (NOR); Line Mygdam (DEN)	
7 May	XCO Cup Costa Blanca – Elda	(Spain) Elda	2	David Valero (ESP); Natalia Fischer (ESP)	David Domingo Campos (ESP); Alice Pirard (BEL)	Manuel Sánchez Aldeguer (ESP); Paula Martín (ESP)	
7 May	Argovia Vittoria-Fischer Cup: Seon	(Switzerland) Seon	3	Sven Olivetti (SUI); Lea Huber (SUI)	Gian Andri Schmid (SUI); Jacqueline Schneebeli (SUI)	Romain Debord (FRA); Cristel Hubacher (SUI)	
14 May	Argovia Vittoria-Fischer Cup: Capriasca Challenge	(Switzerland) Capriasca	2	Romain Debord (FRA); Jacqueline Schneebeli (SUI)	Fabio Püntener (SUI); Cristel Hubacher (SUI)	Samuele Leone (ITA); Lorena Cadalbert (SUI)	
14 May	MTB French Cup DHI	(France) La Grand-Combe	1	Loris Vergier (FRA); Erice van Leuven (NZL)	Dylan Levesque (FRA); Marine Cabirou (FRA)	Johan Garcin (FRA); Lisa Baumann (SUI)	
14 May	Wilder Kaiser MTB Race	(Austria) Scheffau am Wilden Kaiser	2	Tobias König (GER); Andrea Kravanja (GER)	Jan Sommer (SUI); Nadja Heigl (AUT)	Sven Olivetti (SUI); Katja Neuner (AUT)	
14 May	Shimano MTB Liga #2 Roskilde	(Denmark) Roskilde	2	Kristian Andersen (DEN); Ann-Dorthe Lisbygd (DEN)	Mathias Pedersen (DEN); Camilla Knudsen (DEN)	Morten Örnhagen (DEN); Klara Skovgård Hansen (DEN)	
14 May	MTB Weekend Eupen	(Belgium) Eupen	2	Niels Derveaux (BEL); Annemijn van Limpt (NED)	Erno McCrae (BEL); Anaelle Henry (FRA)	Kas van Geest (NED); Femke Mossinkoff (NED)	
17 May	Sakarya MTB Cup Night Race	(Turkey) Adapazarı	1	Gregor Raggl (AUT); Alina Sarkulova (KAZ)	Ursin Spescha (SUI); Virág Buzsáki (HUN)	Dmytro Titarenko (UKR); Tatyana Geneleva (KAZ)	
17–21 May	Crankworx Cairns	(Australia) Cairns	1	Michael Hannah (AUS); Jenna Hastings (NZL)	Jackson Frew (AUS); Louise Ferguson (GBR)	Tuhoto-Ariki Pene (NZL); Ellie Smith (AUS)	
18–21 May	Transgrancanaria Bike – XCMS	(Spain) Las Palmas	S2	Hans Becking (NED); Melissa Maia (POR)	José Dias (POR); Janina Wüst (SUI)	Luis Ángel Maté (ESP); Manuela Mureșan (ROU)	
18–21 May	Belgian Mountainbike Challenge (BeMC) – XCM	(Belgium) La Roche-en-Ardenne	S1	Frans Claes (BEL); Haley Smith (CAN)	Andrew L'Esperance (CAN); Bettina Janas (GER)	Tristan Nortje (RSA); Joyce Vanderbeken (BEL)	
19 May	Englewood Open Short Track	(United States) Fall River	3	Bradyn Lange (USA); Kelsey Urban (USA)	Tyler Clark (CAN); Chloe Fraser (USA)	Brian Matter (USA); Madison Maloney (USA)	
19 May	Sakarya MTB Cup	(Turkey) Adapazarı	HC	Pierre de Froidmont (BEL); Emeline Detilleux (BEL)	Gregor Raggl (AUT); Alina Sarkulova (KAZ)	Arne Janssens (BEL); Virág Buzsáki (HUN)	
19 May	Israel Cup	(Israel) Qula	1	Gil Ly Gonen (ISR); Na'ama Noyman (ISR)	Eitan Levi (ISR); Romi Veldnizki (ISR)	Tomer Zaltsman (ISR)	
19 May	Huskvarna MTB-Tour	(Sweden) Huskvarna	1	Knut Røhme (NOR); Linn Gustafzzon (SWE)	Sebastian Fini Carstensen (DEN); Tilda Hylén (SWE)	Mats Tubaas Glende (NOR); Mari-Liis Mõttus (EST)	
19–20 May	Internacional Estrada Real	(Brazil) Ouro Branco	1	José Gabriel Marques (BRA) (XCO); Karen Olímpio (BRA) (XCO); Henrique Avancini (BRA) (XCC); Karen Olímpio (BRA) (XCC)	Henrique Avancini (BRA) (XCO); Isabella Lacerda (BRA) (XCO); Guilherme Gotardelo Müller (BRA) (XCC); Hercília Najara (BRA) (XCC)	Ulan Bastos Galinski (BRA) (XCO); Hercília Najara (BRA) (XCO); Ulan Bastos Galinski (BRA) (XCC); Isabella Lacerda (BRA) (XCC)	
19–21 May	IXS Dirt Masters Festival	(Germany) Winterberg	2	Philip Atwill (GBR) (Downhill); Nina Hoffmann (GER) (Downhill); Gustaw Dadela (POL) (4X); Josie McFall (GBR) (4X)	Oisin O'Callaghan (IRL) (Downhill); Anna Newkirk (USA) (Downhill); Adrien Loron (FRA) (4X); Lena Bauer (AUT) (4X)	Evan Medcalf (USA) (Downhill); Sian A'Hern (AUS) (Downhill); Hannes Slavik (AUT) (4X)	
19–21 May	Swiss Bike Cup Lugano	(Switzerland) Lugano	2	Vital Albin (SUI); Ronja Blöchlinger (SUI)	Dario Lillo (SUI); Linda Indergand (SUI)	Alexandre Balmer (SUI); Paula Gorycka (POL)	
20 May	Englewood Open	(United States) Fall River	1	Bradyn Lange (USA); Makena Kellerman (USA)	Carson Hampton (USA); Kelsey Urban (USA)	Brian Matter (USA); Kaysee Armstrong (USA)	
20 May	Maja Włoszczowska MTB Race	(Poland) Jelenia Góra	1	Krzysztof Łukasik (POL); Aleksandra Podgórska (POL)	Filip Helta (POL); Klaudia Czabok (POL)	Karol Ostaszewski (POL); Gabriela Wojtyła (POL)	
20–21 May	Kendal MTB Bupati Cup Downhill 2023	(Indonesia) Kendal	2	Bryn Dickerson (NZL); Riska Amelia Agustina (INA)	Rendy Varera Sanjaya (INA); Nilna Murni Ningtias (INA)	Khoiful Mukhib (INA); Ayu Triya Andriana (INA)	
20–21 May	Clásico Balniario de Cerro Gordo	(Puerto Rico) Vega Alta	2	Georwill Pérez (PUR) (XCO); Milagro Mena (CRC) (XCO); Jacob Morales (PUR) (XCC); Milagro Mena (CRC) (XCC)	Fabio Castañeda (COL) (XCO); Suheily Rodríguez (PUR) (XCO); Georwill Pérez (PUR) (XCC); Annelly Oviedo (PUR) (XCC)	Jacob Morales (PUR) (XCO); Xiomara Rivera (PUR) (XCO); Fabio Castañeda (COL) (XCC); Gabriella Tejada (DOM) (XCC)	
20–21 May	Czech MTB Cup	(Czech Republic) Zadov	HC	Georg Egger (GER); Leonie Daubermann (GER)	Mārtiņš Blūms (LVA); Candice Lill (RSA)	Gunnar Holmgren (CAN); Jitka Čábelická (CZE)	
21 May	Abierto Argentino Jujuy Energía Viva #2	(Argentina) San Salvador de Jujuy	1	Agustín Durán (ARG) (XCO); Agustina María Apaza (ARG) (XCO); Agustín Durán (ARG) (XCC); Agustina María Apaza (ARG) (XCC)	Álvaro Macías (ARG) (XCO); Inés Gutiérrez (ARG) (XCO); Lucas Bogado Hermann (PAR) (XCC); Inés Gutiérrez (ARG) (XCC)	Juan Goudailliez (ARG) (XCO); Florencia Anabel Ávila (ARG) (XCO); Joaquín Vera (ARG) (XCC); Florencia Anabel Ávila (ARG) (XCC)	
21 May	Gothenburg MTB Race	(Sweden) Gothenburg	1	Sebastian Fini Carstensen (DEN); Jenny Rissveds (SWE)	Oliver Vedersø Sølvhøj (DEN); Linn Gustafzzon (SWE)	Knut Røhme (NOR); Sara Öberg (SWE)	
21 May	Superprestigio MTB	(Spain) Caparroso	1	David Campos Motos (ESP); Estíbaliz Sagardoy (ESP)	Pablo Rodríguez Guede (ESP); Núria Bosch (ESP)	Felipe Orts (ESP); Joana Monteiro (POR)	
21 May	Shimano Supercup Massi Santa Susanna	(Spain) Santa Susanna	1	Gerardo Ulloa (MEX); Rebecca Henderson (AUS)	David Valero (ESP); Raiza Goulão (BRA)	Jofre Cullell (ESP); Rocío del Alba García (ESP)	
21 May	XCO Kamnik, UCI C1	(Slovenia) Kamnik	1	Sam Fox (AUS); Vita Movrin (SVN)	Daniele Braidot (ITA); Csenge Anna Bokros (HUN)	Dmytro Titarenko (UKR); Nefelly Mangiaterra (ITA)	
21 May	Jura Bike Marathon	(Switzerland) Vallorbe	1	Jakob Hartmann (GER); Estelle Morel (FRA)	Simon Stiebjahn (GER); Margot Moschetti (FRA)	Martin Fanger (SUI); Élise Poehner (FRA)	
24–25 May	2023 Thailand Mountain Bike Cup 2	(Thailand) Chanthaburi	1	Zaenal Fanani (INA); Dara Latifah (INA)	Riyadh Hakim (SIN); Tsai Ya-yu (TPE)	Dhave Roa (PHI); Yonthanan Phonkla (THA)	
25 May	Campeonato Centroamericano de MTB XCO	Guatemala City	1	Luis López (HON); Milagro Mena (CRC)	Andrey Fonseca (CRC); Florinda de León (GUA)	Jhonathan de León (GUA); Ninoska Andino (HON)	
26 May	ARAS MTB XC Race	(Iran) Maragheh	2	Farshid Salahian (IRI)	Faraz Shokri (IRI)	Mohammad Eraghi (IRI)	
26–28 May	MTB French Cup XCO/XCC	(France) Lons-le-Saunier	HC	Joshua Dubau (FRA) (XCO); Loana Lecomte (FRA) (XCO); Gerardo Ulloa (MEX) (XCC); Loana Lecomte (FRA) (XCC)	Jordan Sarrou (FRA) (XCO); Haley Batten (USA) (XCO); Joshua Dubau (FRA) (XCC); Line Burquier (FRA) (XCC)	Gerardo Ulloa (MEX) (XCO); Léna Gérault (FRA) (XCO); Christopher Blevins (USA) (XCC); Léna Gérault (FRA) (XCC)	
26–28 May	Campeonato Sudamericano de MTB	(Paraguay) Encarnación	2	Agustín Durán (ARG) (XCO); Agustina Apaza (ARG) (XCO); Joaquín Vera (ARG) (XCE); Nicole Arce (ARG) (XCE); Agustín Durán (ARG) (XCC); Inés Gutiérrez (ARG) (XCC)	Jorge Álvaro Macias (ARG) (XCO); Inés Gutiérrez (ARG) (XCO); Nicolás Valdez (ARG) (XCE) (XCE); Lucas Bogado (PAR) (XCC); Agustina Apaza (ARG) (XCC)	Sebastián Maldonado (CHI) (XCO); Agustina Antonella Quirós (ARG) (XCO); Nelson David Acosta (PAR) (XCE) (XCE); Sebastián Maldonado (CHI) (XCC); Agustina Quirós (ARG) (XCC)	
26–29 May	iXS Downhill Cup	(Germany) Willingen	2	Henri Kiefer (GER); Nina Hoffmann (GER)	Danny Hart (GBR); Justine Welzel (GER)	Max Hartenstern (GER); Lauryne Chappaz (FRA)	
27 May	Courmayeur MTB Event	(Italy) Courmayeur	1	Filippo Fontana (ITA); Chiara Teocchi (ITA)	Andreas Emanuele Vittone (ITA); Giorgia Marchet (ITA)	Alessio Agostinelli (ITA); Eva Lechner (ITA)	
27 May	Copa Catalana Internacional BTT – VIC	(Spain) Vic	3	Alan Hatherly (RSA); Annie Last (GBR)	Ever Alejandro Gómez (BOL); Núria Bosch (ESP)	Pau Romero (ESP); Noemí Moreno (ESP)	
27 May	Scott BIKE Marathon – XCM	(Germany) Willingen	2	Tim Smeenge (NED); Stefanie Dohrn (GER)	Urs Huber (SUI); Friderike Schnatz (GER)	Mathijs Loman (NED); Carolin Zinn (GER)	
27 May	SA XCO Cup Series	(South Africa) Bloemfontein	1	Philip Buys (RSA); Tyler Jacobs (RSA)	Johann van Zyl (RSA); Rimari Sutton (RSA)	Luke Moir (RSA); Sanchia Malan (RSA)	
27–28 May	Mountain Creek National Downhill	(United States) Vernon Township	3	Dakotah Norton (USA); Riley Miller (USA)	Vlad Sherryuble; Rachel Pageau (CAN)	Jack Pederson (USA); Abby Ronca (USA)	
27–28 May	Evento Internacional UCI de MTB, Bantrab 2023	Guatemala City	2	Iván Aguilar (MEX) (XCO); Daniela Campuzano (MEX) (XCO); Luis López (HON) (XCC); Daniela Campuzano (MEX) (XCC)	Joseph Gerardo Ramírez (CRC) (XCO); Ana Ruth Clark (MEX) (XCO); Luis Aguilar (CRC) (XCC); Ana Ruth Clark (MEX) (XCC)	Luis Aguilar (CRC) (XCO); Milagro Mena (CRC) (XCO); Iván Aguilar (MEX) (XCC); Isabella Gómez (CRC) (XCC)	
27–28 May	2# Copa Soul Sul Mineiro Internacional	(Brazil) Caxambu	2	José Gabriel Marques (BRA); Karen Olímpio (BRA)	Nicolas Rafhael Romão Machado (BRA); Isabella Lacerda (BRA)	Bruno Martins Lemes (BRA); Hercília Najara (BRA)	
27–28 May	Coupe de Japon MTB Yawatahama International MTB Race 2023	(Japan) Yawatahama	HC	Toki Sawada (JPN); Akari Kobayashi (JPN)	Ari Hirabayashi (JPN); Tsai Ya-yu (TPE)	Seiji Sato (JPN); Ariana Thea Patrice Dormitorio (PHI)	
27–28 May	Reto Hacienda Sabanera	(Puerto Rico) Cidra	2	Georwill Pérez (PUR) (XCO); Suheily Rodríguez (PUR) (XCO); Georwill Pérez (PUR) (XCC); Suheily Rodríguez (PUR)(XCC)	Fabio Castañeda (COL) (XCO); Gabriela Tejada (DOM) (XCO); Jacob Morales (PUR)(XCC); Gabriela Tejada (DOM)(XCC)	Jacob Morales (PUR) (XCO); Vanessa Mora (PUR) (XCO); Fabio Castañeda (COL) (XCC) (XCC)	
27–28 May	Vulkan-Race Gedern – Internationale MTB Bundesliga	(Germany) Gedern	1	David List (GER); Nina Benz (GER)	Lennart Krayer (GER); Ronja Eibl (GER)	Tobias Steinhart (GER); Alexa Fuchs (GER)	
28 May	British Cycling National Cross Country Series Round 4	(United Kingdom) Fowey	1	Charlie Aldridge (GBR); Isla Short (GBR)	Cameron Mason (GBR); Ella Maclean-Howell (GBR)	Rory McGuire (GBR); Anna McGorum (GBR)	
28 May	Górale na Start	(Poland) Wałbrzych	3	Filip Helta (POL); Aleksandra Podgórska (POL)	Michał Topór (POL); Kinga Żur (POL)	Riki Kitabayashi (JPN); Gabriela Wojtyła (POL)	
28 May	26 Genoa Cup – Marathon dell'Appennino – XCM	(Italy) Casella	2	Diego Arias (COL); Costanza Fasolis (ITA)	Nicolas Samparisi (ITA); Valentina Picca (ITA)	Lorenzo Samparisi (ITA); Michalina Ziółkowska (POL)	
28 May	XCO Kocevje	(Slovenia) Dolga Vas	1	Sam Fox (AUS); Tanja Žakelj (SVN)	Matthew Wilson (NZL); Vita Movrin (SVN)	Rok Naglič (SVN); Corina Druml (AUT)	
28 May	ÖKK Bike Revolution	(Switzerland) Engelberg	1	Nino Schurter (SUI); Sina Frei (SUI)	Lars Forster (SUI); Alessandra Keller (SUI)	Vital Albin (SUI); Paula Gorycka (POL)	
29 May	MTB Festival Vlaanderen Genk	(Belgium) Genk	2	Clément Horny (BEL); Rosa van Doorn (NED)	Chris van Dijk (NED); Lotte Koopmans (NED)	Arne Janssens (BEL); Femke Mossinkoff (NED)	

=== June ===
Date	Race Name	Location	Class	Winner	Second	Third	Ref
2–3 June	4# Internazionali d'Italia Series – La Thuile	(Italy) La Thuile	HC	Daniele Braidot (ITA); Martina Berta (ITA)	Alessio Agostinelli (ITA); Giada Specia (ITA)	Andreas Emanuele Vittone (ITA); Janika Lõiv (EST)	
2–4 June	2023 African XCO & XCC Continental Championships	South Africa	CC	Philip Buys (RSA) (XCO); Candice Lill (RSA) (XCO); Johann van Zyl (RSA) (XCC); Candice Lill (RSA) (XCC)	Johann van Zyl (RSA) (XCO); Tyler Jacobs (RSA) (XCO); Luke Moir (RSA) (XCC); Tyler Jacobs (RSA) (XCC)	Jaedon Terlouw (RSA) (XCO); Sarah Hill (RSA) (XCO); Daniel van der Watt (RSA) (XCC); Sarah Hill (RSA) (XCC)	
3 June	Raiffeisen Österreich Grand Prix	(Austria) Windhaag bei Perg	1	Mario Bair (AUT); Katharina Sadnik (AUT)	Gregor Raggl (AUT); Nela Viktorová (CZE)	Mathis Guay (FRA); Nina Mosser (AUT)	
3 June	Prima Cup – Skoda Auto Dolní Morava	(Czech Republic) Dolní Morava	2	Filip Adel (CZE); Milena Kalašová (CZE)	Jan Strož (CZE); Kateřina Krutílková (CZE)	Karel Hník (CZE); Andrea Maťhová (CZE)	
3 June	4X Pro Tour Bike Festival 2023	(Czech Republic) Dobřany	3	Tomáš Slavík (CZE); Josie McFall (GBR)	Gustaw Dadela (POL)	Scott Beaumont (GBR)	
3 June	Mythic Chrono Ekoï	(France) Samoëns	2	Rémi Groslambert (FRA); Manon Socquet (FRA)	Luc Grosjean (FRA); Camille Girardin (FRA)	Quentin Gardet (FRA); Noémie Le Chatelier (FRA)	
3 June	Greenzone Zalaegerszeg XCO Cup	(Hungary) Zalaegerszeg	2	Zsombor Palumby (HUN); Virág Buzsáki (HUN)	Hannes Degenkolb (GER); Csenge Anna Bokros (HUN)	Benedek Borsos (HUN); Lora Oravecz (HUN)	
3–4 June	Marathon Finale Outdoor Region 2023 – XCM	(Italy) Finale Ligure	1	Luca Accordi (ITA); Chiara Mandelli (ITA)	Marco Galeotti (ITA); Mona Stockhecke (SUI)	Arthur Blanc (FRA)	
3–4 June	Sande MTB Weekend	(Norway) Sande	2	Knut Røhme (NOR) (XCO); Berit Nordsæter Resell (NOR) (XCO); Knut Røhme (NOR) (XCC); Sara Öberg (SWE) (XCC)	Mats Tubaas Glende (NOR) (XCO); Ingrid Bøe Jacobsen (NOR) (XCO); Sondre Rokke (NOR) (XCC); Tilda Hylén (SWE) (XCC)	Emil Hasund Eid (NOR) (XCO); Sara Öberg (SWE) (XCO); Emil Hasund Eid (NOR) (XCC); Berit Nordsæter Resell (NOR) (XCC)	
3–4 June	Portugal Cup XCO – Fundão	(Portugal) Fundão	1	Roberto Ferreira (POR); Raquel Queirós (POR)	Mário Costa (POR); Ana Santos (POR)	Diogo Neves (POR); Lara Lois (POR)	
3–4 June	The Showdown @Angler’s Ridge	(United States) Danville	1	Lukas Vrouwenvelder (USA) (XCO); Kelsey Urban (USA) (XCO); Lukas Vrouwenvelder (USA) (XCC); Kelsey Urban (USA) (XCC)	Kyan Olshove (USA) (XCO); Madison Maloney (USA) (XCO); Dane Grey (USA) (XCC); Madison Maloney (USA) (XCC)	Lasse Konecny (USA) (XCO); Holly LaVesser (USA) (XCO); Lasse Konecny (USA) (XCC); Sydney Wenger (USA) (XCC)	
4 June	Copa Internacional Volta	(Argentina) Pilar	2	Agustín Durán (ARG); Agustina Apaza (ARG)	Facundo Cayata (ARG); Valentina Santomartino (ARG)	Luciano Gay (ARG); Lucía Cabrera Pipke (ARG)	
4 June	Hardwood Canada Cup XCO	(Canada) Oro-Medonte	2	Quinton Disera (CAN); Nicole Bradbury (CAN)	Tyler Clark (CAN); Juliette Tétreault (CAN)	Noah Ramsay (CAN); Julianne Sarrazin (CAN)	
4 June	XCO Samobor	(Croatia) Samobor	1	Charlie Aldridge (GBR); Csenge Anna Bokros (HUN)	Rok Naglič (SVN); Maria Zarantonello (ITA)	Dmytro Titarenko (UKR); Larisa Bošnjak (CRO)	
4 June	MTB French Cup DHI	(France) Valberg	1	Johan Garcin (FRA); Lisa Baumann (SUI)	Mael Gironde (FRA); Emy Grandouiller (FRA)	Ian Guionnet (FRA); Emily Horridge (GBR)	
4 June	Shimano Supercup Massi Cala Ratjada	(Spain) Cala Ratjada	1	Alexandre Langlais (FRA); Rocío del Alba García (ESP)	Luis Francisco Pérez (ESP); Lucia Gómez Andreu (ESP)	Gerard Moya Clapera (ESP); Paula Martín Varo (ESP)	
4 June	Izmir MTB Cup	(Turkey) İzmir	2	Samet Bulut (TUR); Azize Bekar (TUR)	Ahmet Akpınar (TUR); Semra Yetiş (TUR)	Zeki Kaygısız (TUR); Asuman Burcu Balcı (TUR)	
8 June	Missoula XC	(United States) Missoula	2	Bradyn Lange (USA); Michaela Thompson (USA)	Ivan Sippy (USA); Eva Poidevin (CAN)	Caleb Swartz (USA); Erin Osborne (USA)	
9 June	Desafio Internacional do Cerrado De MTB – XCC	(Brazil) Goiânia	3	José Gabriel Marques (BRA); Karen Olímpio (BRA)	Nicholas Rafhael Romão (BRA); Iara Caetano (BRA)	Guilherme Gotardelo Müller (BRA); Hercília Najara (BRA)	
9 June	Missoula XC	(United States) Missoula	2	Bradyn Lange (USA); Michaela Thompson (USA)	Logan Sadesky (CAN); Ruth Holcomb (USA)	Ivan Sippy (USA); Erin Osborne (USA)	
10 June	MTB Eliminator Falun – XCE-XCC	(Sweden) Falun	3	Sondre Rokke (NOR); Agnes Abrahamsson (SWE)	Edvin Lindh (SWE); Didi de Vries (NED)	Noel Olsson (SWE); Elin Karlsson (SWE)	
10 June	Missoula XC	(United States) Missoula	1	Lasse Konecny (USA); Michaela Thompson (USA)	Logan Sadesky (CAN); Erin Osborne (USA)	Dane Grey (USA); Ruth Holcomb (USA)	
10–11 June	Taça Brasil De Cross Country – Etapa Goiânia	(Brazil) Goiânia	1	Ulan Bastos Galinski (BRA); Karen Olímpio (BRA)	Guilherme Gotardelo Müller (BRA); Hercília Najara (BRA)	José Gabriel Marques (BRA); Liege Walter (BRA)	
10–11 June	Copa Mezuena Specialized V2	(Colombia) Cucunubá	2	Hilvar Malaver (COL)	Juan David Ahumada (COL)	Mateo Garnica (COL)	
11 June	2023 European XCM Continental Championships	France	CC	Wout Alleman (BEL); Adelheid Morath (GER)	Fabian Rabensteiner (ITA); Estelle Morel (FRA)	Simon Schneller (GER); Irina Lützelschwab (SUI)	
11 June	Shimano Mtb Liga #3 Varde	(Denmark) Varde	2	Mathias Dahl Pedersen (DEN); Janni Spangsberg (DEN)	Klaus Nielsen (DEN); Line Mygdam (DEN)	Kristian Andersen (DEN); Emma Lyngholm (DEN)	
11 June	CST MTB Gdynia Maraton – XCM	(Poland) Gdynia	2	Maciej Paterski (POL); Aleksandra Andrzejewska (POL)	Peeter Tarvis (EST); Kamila Mróz (POL)	Artur Sowiński (POL); Wiktoria Klawitter (POL)	
11 June	Lugnet XCO	(Sweden) Falun	2	Sondre Rokke (NOR); Tilda Hylén (SWE)	Niko Heikkilä (FIN); Tove Dandenell (SWE)	Emil Lindgren (SWE); Åsa Maria Erlandsson (SWE)	
11 June	Argovia Vittoria-Fischer Cup: MTB Cross Biasca	(Switzerland) Biasca	2	Luis López (HON); Sofia Arici (ITA)	Gianluca Cerri (ITA); María José Salamanca (COL)	Philipp Bachmann (SUI); Maria Sherstiuk (UKR)	
15 June	Canmore Canada Cup XCC	(Canada) Canmore	3	Tyler Clark (CAN); Erin Osborne (USA)	Cameron Jones (NZL); Julianne Sarrazin (CAN)	Simon Ruelland (CAN); Jenaya Francis (CAN)	
17 June	Canmore Canada Cup XCO	(Canada) Canmore	1	Cameron Jones (NZL); Ella MacPhee (CAN)	Logan Sadesky (CAN); Erin Osborne (USA)	Marc-André Fortier (CAN); Juliette Larose-Gingras (CAN)	
17 June	Borlänge Tour XCO	(Sweden) Borlänge	2	Matthias Wengelin (SWE); Ida Ossiansson (SWE)	Niko Heikkilä (FIN); Moa Gustafzzon (SWE)	Axel Lindh (SWE); Alicia Petersdotter (SWE)	
17 June	Hero Südtirol Dolomites – XCM	(Italy) Sëlva	HC	Héctor Leonardo Páez (COL); Adelheid Morath (GER)	Samuele Porro (ITA); Kataržina Sosna (LTU)	Diego Arias (COL); Sandra Mairhofer (ITA)	
17 June	International MTB Marathon Malevil Cup – XCM	(Czech Republic) Jablonné v Podještědí	1	Simon Stiebjahn (GER); Aleksandra Andrzejewska (POL)	Marek Rauchfuss (CZE); Janelle Uibokand (EST)	Filip Adel (CZE); Dörte Martischewsky (GER)	
17–18 June	2023 Pan-American XCM Continental Championships	Colombia	CC	Juan Fernando Monroy (COL); Mónica Calderon (COL)	Jhonnatan Botero Villegas (COL); Michela Molina (ECU)	Sebastián Gesche Antona (CHI); Juliana Zambrano (COL)	
18 June	Desafio Dama Roja – XCM	(Spain) Ramales de la Victoria	2	Ismael Esteban Agüero (ESP); Ariadna Ródenas (ESP)	Alberto Mingorance (ESP); Tessa Kortekaas (NED)	Manuel Cordero Morgado (ESP); Meritxell Figueras Garangou (ESP)	
18 June	Argovia Vittoria-Fischer Bike Cup Lostorf	(Switzerland) Lostorf	2	Joris Ryf (SUI); Rebekka Estermann (SUI)	Valentin Remondet (FRA); Pauline Roy (SUI)	Gian Andri Schmid (SUI); Cristel Hubacher (SUI)	
18 June	Copa Catalana Internacional BTT – Vall de Boí	(Spain) Vall de Boí	2	Felipe Orts (ESP); Núria Bosch Picó (ESP)	Mario Sinués Micó (ESP); Blanca Vallés Mejías (ESP)	Anthony Zaragoza (FRA); Laura Michelle Kalberg (NED)	
18 June	Shark Attack Bike-Festival 2023	(Germany) Saalhausen Hills	2	Tobias Steinhart (GER); Femke Mossinkoff (NED)	Jarne Vandersteen (BEL); Romana Carfora (NED)	Brian Schouteden (BEL); Annemijn van Limpt (NED)	
22–25 June	Alpentour Trophy – XCMS	(Austria) Schladming	S1	Héctor Leonardo Páez (COL); Milena Kalašová (CZE)	Alexey Medvedev; Andrea Böttger (GER)	Frans Claes (BEL); Marlies Feichtenhofer (AUT)	
22–25 June	Crankworx Innsbruck	(Austria) Innsbruck	1	Bernard Kerr (GBR); Valentina Höll (AUT)	Oliver Zwar (SWE); Anna Newkirk (USA)	Jakob Jewett (CAN); Phoebe Gale (GBR)	
23 June	Race XCM Arica	(Chile) Arica	2	Sebastián Gesche (CHI); Mariana Rojas (PER)	Patricio Campbell (CHI); Ana Laura Fontes (URU)	Alain Quispe (PER); Carolina Vanesa Maldonado (ARG)	
23 June	CIMTB Nova Lima: XCC Class 3	(Brazil) Nova Lima	3	José Gabriel Marques (BRA); Karen Olímpio (BRA)	Ulan Bastos Galinski (BRA); Isabella Lacerda (BRA)	Ignacio Gallo (CHI); Ana Laura Oliveira Moraes (BRA)	
24 June	SA XCO Cup Series	(South Africa) Parys	1	Philip Buys (RSA); Danielle Strydom (RSA)	Jan Withaar (RSA); Karlise Scheepers (RSA)	Michael Foster (RSA); Sanchia Malan (RSA)	
24 June	Whistler Canada Cup XCO	(Canada) Whistler	1	Peter Disera (CAN); Ella MacPhee (CAN)	Cameron Jones (NZL); Sandra Walter (CAN)	Quinton Disera (CAN); Jocelyn Stel (CAN)	
24–25 June	Swiss Bike Cup Savognin	(Switzerland) Savognin	2	Vital Albin (SUI); Rebekka Estermann (SUI)	Juri Zanotti (ITA); Jacqueline Schneebeli (SUI)	Fabio Spena (SUI); Cristel Hubacher (SUI)	
24–25 June	Borovets Open Cup	(Bulgaria) Borovets	1	Stivian Gatev (BUL); Denitsa Tosheva (BUL)	Dimitar Mazneykov (BUL); Viktoria Goncheva (BUL)	Jordan Donev (BUL); Veneta Zaharieva (BUL)	
24–25 June	Abierto Argentino San Luis #3	(Argentina) Terrazas del Portezuelo	2	Fernando Contreras (ARG) (XCO); Inés Gutiérrez (ARG) (XCO); Fernando Contreras (ARG) (XCC); Inés Gutiérrez (ARG) (XCC)	Agustín Durán (ARG) (XCO); Florencia Anabel Ávila (ARG) (XCO); Agustín Durán (ARG) (XCC); Florencia Anabel Ávila (ARG) (XCC)	Álvaro Macías (ARG) (XCO); Francisca Chiesa Bachey (ARG) (XCO); Facundo Cayata (ARG) (XCC); Costanza Pezzotti (ARG)	
24–26 June	SOHO Bike Fest	(United States) Midway	1	Keegan Swenson (USA) (XCO); Sofía Gómez Villafane (ARG) (XCO); Carson Hampton (USA) (XCC); Sofía Gómez Villafane (ARG) (XCC)	Matthew Beers (RSA) (XCO); Ruth Holcomb (USA) (XCO); Keegan Swenson (USA) (XCC); Ruth Holcomb (USA) (XCC)	Georwill Pérez (PUR) (XCO); Hannah Otto (USA) (XCO); Toby Hassett (USA) (XCC); Hannah Otto (USA) (XCC)	
25 June	2023 European XCO Continental Championships	Poland	CC	Vlad Dascălu (ROU); Puck Pieterse (NED)	Lars Forster (SUI); Mona Mitterwallner (AUT)	Luca Braidot (ITA); Sina Frei (SUI)	
25 June	CIMTB Nova Lima: XCO Class 1	(Brazil) Nova Lima	1	José Gabriel Marques (BRA); Raiza Goulão (BRA)	Ulan Bastos Galinski (BRA); Karen Olímpio (BRA)	Guilherme Gotardelo Müller (BRA); Isabella Lacerda (BRA)	
25 June	MTB French Cup – DHI	(France) Les Carroz d'Arâches	1	Eliott Baud (FRA); Lisa Bouladou (FRA)	Léo Abella (FRA); Lauryne Chappaz (FRA)	Johan Garcin (FRA); Mariana Salazar (ESA)	
25 June	Superprestigio MTB	(Spain) Estella-Lizarra	2	Ismael Esteban Agüero (ESP); Ana Santos (POR)	Miguel Rámirez de Arellano (ESP); Estíbaliz Sagardoy (ESP)	Gexan Albisu Etxebeste (ESP); Joana Monteiro (POR)	
25 June	3 Nations Cup – Vayamundo MTB Cup	(Belgium) Houffalize	2	Jarne Vandersteen (BEL); Jette Aelken (GER)	Théo Demarcin (BEL); Annemijn van Limpt (NED)	Niklas Schehl (GER); Anaëlle Henry (FRA)	
29 June – 2 July	Engadin Bike Giro – XCMS	(Switzerland) Celerina/Schlarigna	S2	Sascha Weber (GER); Adelheid Morath (GER)	Motoshi Kadota (JPN); Vera Looser (NAM)	Juul van Loon (NED); Bettina Janas (GER)	
30 June	4X Pro Tour	(Italy) Val di Sole	3	Tomáš Slavík (CZE); Jolanda Kiener (SUI)	Stefano Dolfin (ITA); Louise-Anna Ferguson (GBR)	Janis Lehmann (SUI); Ramona Kupferschmied (SUI)	
30 June – 2 July	IXS Downhill Cup	(Germany) Steinach	2	Johann Potgieter (RSA); Lea Kumpf (GER)	Thore Hemmerling (GER); Roos Op de Beeck (BEL)	Erik Irmisch (GER); Anouk Arendt (GER)	

=== July ===
Date	Race Name	Location	Class	Winner	Second	Third	Ref
1 July	MB Race – XCM	(France) Combloux	HC	Martin Fanger (SUI); Samara Sheppard (NZL)	Urs Huber (SUI); Estelle Morel (FRA)	Loïc Blanc (SUI); Margot Moschetti (FRA)	
1 July	Hellenic XCE Series #2	(Greece) Xanthi	3	Ede Molnar (ROU); Eleftheria Giachou (GRE)	Nikolaos Georgiadis (GRE); Alexandra Adam (GRE)	Stamatis Englezos (GRE); Athina Tsismenaki (GRE)	
2 July	British Cycling National Cross Country Series Round 5	(United Kingdom) Cannock Chase	2	Lewis Askey (GBR); Anna McGorum (GBR)	Corran Carrick-Anderson (GBR); Anna Kay (GBR)	Huw Buck Jones (GBR); Grace Inglis (GBR)	
2 July	Hellenic Cup #4	(Greece) Xanthi	2	Ede Molnar (ROU); Eleftheria Giachou (GRE)	Alexandros Athanasiadis (GRE); Alexandra Adam (GRE)	Dimitrios Antoniadis (GRE); Despoina Vathi (GRE)	
5–8 July	Kupkolo.cz MTB Trilogy – XCMS	(Czech Republic) Teplice nad Metují	S2	Michael Holland (AUT); Karla Löffelmann (CZE)	Marek Rauchfuss (CZE); Lenka Fridrichová (CZE)	Mathias Rosenberg Pedersen (DEN); Andrea Maťhová (CZE)	
5–8 July	Epic Andorra Pyrenees – XCMS	(Andorra) La Massana	S2	Hans Becking (NED); Janina Wüst (SUI)	José Dias (POR); Meritxell Figueras (ESP)	Martin Frey (GER); Ariadna Ródenas (ESP)	
6–9 July	2023 European XCC Continental Championships	Portugal	CC	David Domingo Campos (ESP); Ronja Blöchlinger (SUI)	Adrien Boichis (FRA); Noëlle Buri (SUI)	Thomas Litscher (SUI); Kira Böhm (GER)	
6–9 July	2023 European XCR Continental Championships	Portugal	CC	Denmark (DEN); Gustav Heby Pedersen; Albert Philipsen ️Julie Lillelund️️️ Sofie Heby Pedersen; Sebastian Fini Carstensen; Malene Degn	France (FRA); Adrien Boichis; Julien Hemon; Noémie Garnier; Line Burquier; Anaïs Moulin; Mathis Guay	Italy (ITA); Gabriel Borre; Elian Paccagnella; Elisa Lanfranchi; Sara Cortinovis; Valentina Corvi; Andreas Emanuele Vittone	
7–8 July	Cycling at the 2023 Central American and Caribbean Games	(El Salvador) San Salvador	JR	Jhonnatan Botero Villegas (COL); Daniela Campuzano (MEX)	Gerardo Ulloa (MEX); Adriana Rojas (CRC)	Georwill Pérez (PUR); Ana Maria Roa (COL)	
7–9 July	Copa Colombia MTB V	(Colombia) Cota	2	Hilvar Yamid Malaver (COL) (XCO); Gloria Garzón (COL) (XCO); Fabio Castañeda (COL) (XCC); Gloria Garzón (COL) (XCC)	Diego Alfonso Arias (COL) (XCO); Zharick Madariaga (COL) (XCO); Juan Fernando Monroy (COL) (XCC); Zharick Madariaga (COL) (XCC)	Juan Fernando Monroy (COL) (XCO); Camila Cagua González (COL) (XCO); Hilvar Yamid Malaver (COL) (XCC); Sofía Villegas (COL) (XCC)	
7–9 July	MTB French Cup – XCO/XCE	(France) Puy-Saint-Vincent	1	Antoine Philipp (FRA) (XCO); Noémie Medina (FRA) (XCO); Killian Demangeon (FRA) (XCE); Amélie Vazeille (FRA) (XCC)	Loan Cheneval (FRA) (XCO); Flavie Guille (FRA) (XCO); Lorenzo Serres (FRA) (XCE); Margaux Borrelly (FRA) (XCC)	Clement Izquierdo (FRA) (XCO); Electa Gallezot (FRA) (XCO); Clément Cousin (FRA) (XCC); Flavie Guille (FRA) (XCC)	
7–9 July	28. Südtirol Dolomiti Superbike – XCM	(Italy) Niederdorf	HC	Héctor Leonardo Páez (COL); Adelheid Morath (GER)	Fabian Rabensteiner (ITA); Costanza Fasolis (ITA)	Martin Stošek (CZE); Irina Lützelschwab (SUI)	
8 July	Sherbrooke Canada Cup XCO	(Canada) Sherbrooke	1	Gunnar Holmgren (CAN); Laurie Arseneault (CAN)	Carter Woods (CAN); Cindy Montambault (CAN)	Cameron Jones (NZL); Roxane Vermette (CAN)	
8 July	Serbia Epic Stara Planina	(Serbia) Stara Planina	2	Daniel van der Walt (RSA); Eleftheria Giachou (GRE)	Alexandros Athanasiadis (GRE); Marijana Urošević (SRB)	Áron Mihály Horváth (HUN)	
8–9 July	Taça Brasil de XCO – Paraná	(Brazil) Antonina	2	Guilherme Gotardelo Müller (BRA); Dauana Nodari (BRA)	Ricardo Pscheidt (BRA); Ana Luísa Korc Panini (BRA)	Alex Malacarne (BRA); Débora Moura (BRA)	
8–9 July	SilverStar Canada Cup DH	(Canada) Silver Star	2	Jackson Frew (AUS); Sophi Lawrence (CAN)	Brock Hawes (CAN); Natasha Miller (CAN)	Haydyn Wynter (CAN); Ainhoa Ijurco (ESP)	
8–9 July	Weissenfelser MTB Event XCO	(Germany) Weißenfels	2	David List (GER); Jana Czeczinkarová (CZE)	Niklas Schehl (GER); Jette Aelken (GER)	Benjamin Muth (GER); Lina Dorscht (GER)	
8–9 July	Köykäri MTB Weekend	(Finland) Kokkola	2	Niko Heikkilä (FIN) (XCC); Antonia Haga (FIN) (XCC); Niko Heikkilä (FIN) (XCO); Sini Alusniemi (FIN) (XCO)	André Haga (FIN) (XCC) (XCC); Mikhail Utkin (XCO); Antonia Haga (FIN) (XCO)	Mikhail Utkin (XCC) (XCC); Sakari Lehtinen (FIN) (XCO); Riikka Tikkala (FIN) (XCO)	
8–9 July	5# Internazionali D’Italia Series – MTB Alpago Trophy	(Italy) Lamosano	HC	Cameron Orr (GBR); Giada Specia (ITA)	Luca Braidot (ITA); Greta Seiwald (ITA)	Daniele Braidot (ITA); Chiara Teocchi (ITA)	
9 July	Merkur Quebec Cup XCO	(Canada) Sherbrooke	2	Victor Verreault (CAN); Laurie Arseneault (CAN)	Owen Clark (CAN); Juliette Tétreault (CAN)	Tyler Orschel (CAN); Cindy Montambault (CAN)	
9 July	ÖKK Bike Revolution	(Switzerland) Davos	1	Lars Forster (SUI); Alessandra Keller (SUI)	Vital Albin (SUI); Nicole Koller (SUI)	Nino Schurter (SUI); Sina Frei (SUI)	
9 July	Zanzenbergrennen	(Austria) Dornbirn	1	Mario Bair (AUT); Laura Stigger (AUT)	Anton Cooper (NZL); Tina Züger (SUI)	Arne Janssens (BEL); Kaya Pfau (GER)	
9 July	Copa Internacional Salta	(Argentina) Salta	2	Alvaro Macías (ARG); Agustina Quirós (ARG)	Facundo Cayata (ARG); Florencia Ávila (ARG)	Ricardo Colque (ARG); Lucía Cabrera (ARG)	
9 July	Serbian Grand Prix – M Enterijer Gradnja Cup 2023	(Serbia) Crna Trava	1	Daniel van der Walt (RSA); Eleftheria Giachou (GRE)	Alexandros Athanasiadis (GRE); Bojana Jovanović (SRB)	Áron Mihály Horváth (HUN); Romi Veldnizki (ISR)	
9–15 July	Bike Transalp – XCM	(Austria) Nauders	S1	Urs Huber (SUI); Lorenza Menapace (ITA)	Simon Schneller (GER); Danièle Troesch (FRA)	Frans Claes (BEL); Michaela Barz (GER)	
14 July	Dieppe Canada Cup XCC	(Canada) Dieppe	3	Raphael Auclair (CAN); Laurie Arseneault (CAN)	Logan Sadesky (CAN); Cindy Montambault (CAN)	Peter Disera (CAN); Jocelyn Stel (CAN)	
14–15 July	4X Pro Tour – JBC 4x Revelations 2023	(Czech Republic) Jablonec nad Nisou	3	Tomáš Slavík (CZE)	Pavel Reinl (CZE)	Erik Emmrich (GER)	
14–16 July	iXS European Downhill Cup	(Austria) Semmering	1	Adam Rojček (SVK); Justine Welzel (GER)	Stefano Introzzi (ITA); Lisa Gava (ITA)	Denis Kohút (SVK); Kerstin Sallegger (AUT)	
15 July	Triada MTB Păltiniş	(Romania) Păltiniş	1	Zsombor Palumby (HUN); Manuela Mureșan (ROU)	Pierre-Geoffroy Plantet (FRA); Erika Glajzová (SVK)	Matej Ulík (SVK); Eszter Bereczki (ROU)	
15–16 July	Copa Mezuena Specialized V3	(Colombia) Zipaquirá	3	Hilvar Malaver (COL); Mónica Calderon (COL)	Fabio Castañeda (COL); Zharick Madariaga (COL)	Hugo Rodríguez (COL); Leidy Mera (COL)	
15–16 July	Caribbean Mountain Bike Cycling Championships	(Puerto Rico) Salinas	3	Jacob Morales (PUR) (XCO); Suheily Rodríguez (PUR) (XCO); Jacob Morales (PUR) (XCC); Suheily Rodríguez (PUR) (XCC)	Juan Rivera Reyes (PUR) (XCO); Vanessa Mora (PUR) (XCO); Juan Rivera Reyes (PUR) (XCC); Vanessa Mora (PUR) (XCC)	José Vélez Bague (PUR) (XCO) (XCO); Ángel Ortiz (PUR) (XCC) (XCC)	
16 July	Black Forest Ultra Bike Marathon	(Germany) Kirchzarten	1	Casey South (SUI); Vera Looser (NAM)	Konny Looser (SUI); Bettina Janas (GER)	Simon Stiebjahn (GER); Kataržina Sosna (LTU)	
16 July	3# Copa Soul Sul Mineiro Internacional	(Brazil) Machado	2	Ulan Bastos Galinski (BRA); Raiza Goulão (BRA)	José Gabriel Marques (BRA); Karen Olímpio (BRA)	Guilherme Gotardelo Müller (BRA); Hercília Najara (BRA)	
16 July	Dieppe Canada Cup XCO	(Canada) Dieppe	1	Owen Clark (CAN); Haley Smith (CAN)	Andrew L'Esperance (CAN); Juliette Tétreault (CAN)	Peter Disera (CAN); Mackenzie Myatt (CAN)	
16–21 July	Transmaurienne Vanoise	(France) Aussois	2	Hugo Drechou (FRA); Margot Moschetti (FRA)	Pierre Billaud (FRA); Estelle Morel (FRA)	Sébastien Carabin (BEL); Alizée Paties (FRA)	
18–19 July	Panorama Canada Cup DH	(Canada) Panorama Mountain Resort	2	Gabriel Neron (CAN); Emmy Lan (CAN)	Jack Pelland (CAN); Bailey Goldstone (CAN)	Brock Hawes (CAN); Eva Leikermoser (CAN)	
22 July	SA XCO Cup Series	(South Africa) Pietermaritzburg	1	Philip Buys (RSA); Tyler Jacobs (RSA)	Michael Foster (RSA); Stacey Hyslop (ZIM)	Johan de Villiers (RSA); Lehane Oosthuizen (RSA)	
23 July	Crankworx Canadian Open DH	(Canada) Whistler	1	Dane Jewett (CAN); Valentina Höll (AUT)	Jakob Jewett (CAN); Louise-Anna Ferguson (GBR)	Mark Wallace (CAN); Miranda Miller (CAN)	
27–30 July	Colina Triste – XCMS	(Spain) Santo Domingo de Silos	S1	Sergio Mantecón Gutiérrez (ESP); Ariadna Ródenas (ESP)	José María Sánchez Ruiz (ESP); Pilar Fernández (ESP)	Manuel Cordero (ESP); Celina Carpinteiro (POR)	
28–30 July	iXS Downhill Cup	(Germany) Ilmenau	2	Gilles Franck (BEL); Justine Welzel (GER)	Bryn Dickerson (NZL); Harriet Rücknagel (GER)	Thore Hemmerling (GER); Monica Gasbichler (GER)	
28–30 July	Internacional Estrada Real	(Brazil) Arcos	1	Henrique Avancini (BRA) (XCO); Karen Olímpio (BRA) (XCO); José Gabriel Marques (BRA) (XCC); Karen Olímpio (BRA) (XCC)	Ulan Bastos Galinski (BRA) (XCO); Isabella Lacerda (BRA) (XCO); Ulan Bastos Galinski (BRA) (XCC); Isabella Lacerda (BRA) (XCC)	José Gabriel Marques (BRA) (XCO); Raiza Goulão (BRA) (XCO); Nicolas Machado (BRA) (XCC); Ana Laura Oliveira Moraes (BRA) (XCC)	
29 July	M3 Montafon Mountainbike – XCM	(Austria) Schruns	1	Frans Claes (BEL); Tanja Priller (GER)	Markus Kaufmann (GER); Milena Kalašová (CZE)	Caleb Kieninger (GER); Violette Irakoze (RWA)	
29 July	XCO Csömör Kupa	(Hungary) Csömör	2	Zsombor Palumby (HUN); Blanka Vas (HUN)	Krzysztof Łukasik (POL); Virág Buzsáki (HUN)	Jan Škarnitzl (CZE); Jitka Čábelická (CZE)	
29–30 July	Pamporovo Bike Fest	(Bulgaria) Pamporovo	1	Douglas Goodwill (GBR); Izabela Yankova (BUL)	Stivian Gatev (BUL); Maria Pantazi (GRE)	Thomas Guibal (FRA)	

=== August ===
Date	Race Name	Location	Class	Winner	Second	Third	Ref
5 August	Horska kola Stupno	(Czech Republic) Břasy	2	Ondřej Cink (CZE); Adéla Holubová (CZE)	Julian Schelb (GER); Simona Spěšná (CZE)	Fabio Püntener (SUI); Gabriela Wojtyła (POL)	
12–13 August	MTB French Cup DHI	(France) Châtel	1	Matteo Iniguez (FRA); Marine Cabirou (FRA)	Dylan Levesque (FRA); Lisa Baumann (SUI)	Gaëtan Vigé (FRA); Erice Van Leuven (NZL)	
12–13 August	Dunbar Summer Series Canada Cup DH	(Canada) Golden	2	Gabriel Neron (CAN); Ainhoa Ijurco (ESP)	Jack Pelland (CAN); Eva Leikermoser (CAN)	Patrick Laffey (CAN); Kiera Melnechuk (CAN)	
12–13 August	Sart Ijen Geopark Downhill 2023	(Indonesia) Banyuwangi	1	Pahraz Salman Al Parisi (INA); Riska Amelia Agustina (INA)	Agung Priyo Apriliano (INA); Nilna Murni Ningtias (INA)	Andy Prayoga (INA); Ayu Triya Andriana (INA)	
13 August	Argovia Vittoria-Fischer Cup	(Switzerland) Hägglingen	3	Simon Walter (SUI); Nicole Pesse (ITA)	Nick Bürki (SUI); Jana Czeczinkarová (CZE)	Andrin Walter (SUI); Cristel Hubacher (SUI)	
13 August	City Mountainbike – XCC	(Belgium) Oudenaarde	3	Theo Hauser (AUT); Gaia Tormena (ITA)	Sondre Rokke (NOR); Line Mygdam (DEN)	Titouan Perrin-Ganier (FRA); Marion Fromberger (GER)	
13–14 August	E-Tour du Mont Blanc	(Switzerland) Verbier	3	Kevin Marry (FRA); Anna Spielmann (AUT)	Jérôme Gilloux (FRA); Alia Marcellini (ITA)	Hugo Pigeon (FRA); Estelle Charles (FRA)	
15–19 August	SPAR Swiss Epic – XCMS	(Switzerland) Lenzerheide	S1	Martin Stošek (CZE); Marc Stutzmann (SUI); Vera Looser (NAM); Kimberley Le Court (MRI)	Daniel Geismayr (AUT); Wout Alleman (BEL); Kataržina Sosna (LTU); Irina Lützelschwab (SUI)	Simon Schneller (GER); Axel Roudil-Cortinat (FRA); Mónica Calderón (COL); Tessa Kortekaas (NED)	
15–19 August	Short Track Internacional UCI TM	(Argentina) San Miguel de Tucumán	3	Juan Ignacio Goudailliez (ARG); Agustina Quirós (ARG)	Tomás Montenegro (ARG); Florecia Avila (ARG)	Ricardo Colque Domínguez (ARG)	
18 August	Grand Prix Banja Luka	(Bosnia and Herzegovina) Banja Luka	1	Bartłomiej Wawak (POL); Yana Belomoyna (UKR)	Filippo Fontana (ITA); Theresia Schwenk (GER)	Oleksandr Hudyma (UKR); Aleksandra Podgórska (POL)	
18–20 August	IXS Downhill Cup	(Germany) Bad Tabarz	2	Nico Lamm (GER); Lea Kumpf (GER)	Bryn Dickerson (NZL); Lea Stornebel (GER)	Thore Hemmerling (GER); Harriet Rücknagel (GER)	
19 August	Grand Prix Prijedor	(Bosnia and Herzegovina) Prijedor	1	Bartłomiej Wawak (POL); Yana Belomoyna (UKR)	Filippo Fontana (ITA); Theresia Schwenk (GER)	Rok Naglič (SVN); Gabriela Wojtyła (POL)	
19 August	Grand Raid BCVS – MTB Alpine Cup – XCM	(Switzerland) Grimentz	HC	Andreas Seewald (GER); Stefanie Dohrn (GER)	David Gysling (SUI); Estelle Morel (FRA)	Hansueli Stauffer (SUI); Claudia Peretti (ITA)	
19–20 August	2023 European DHI Continental Championships	France	CC	Nathan Pontvianne (FRA); Eleonora Farina (ITA)	Antoine Vidal (FRA); Monika Hrastnik (SVN)	Baptiste Pierron (FRA); Lisa Baumann (SUI)	
19–20 August	Dunbar Summer Series Canada Cup DH	(Canada) Kamloops	2	Gabriel Neron (CAN); Ainhoa Ijurco (ESP)	Patrick Laffey (CAN); Emmy Lan (CAN)	Jack Pelland (CAN); Sophi Lawrence (CAN)	
19–20 August	Dalatråkken MTB	(Sweden) Brumunddal	1	Knut Røhme (NOR) (XCC); Berit Nordsæter Resell (NOR) (XCC); Knut Røhme (NOR) (XCO); Berit Nordsæter Resell (NOR) (XCO)	Martin Farstadvoll (NOR) (XCC); Sigrid Andrea Fløgstad (NOR) (XCC); Emil Hasund Eid (NOR) (XCO); Oda Laforce (NOR) (XCO)	Sondre Rokke (NOR) (XCC); Oda Laforce (NOR) (XCC); Sondre Rokke (NOR) (XCO); Sigrid Andrea Fløgstad (NOR) (XCO)	
19–20 August	Czech MTB Cup	(Czech Republic) Harrachov	1	Ondřej Cink (CZE); Lia Schrievers (GER)	Krzysztof Łukasik (POL); Jitka Čábelická (CZE)	Lukáš Kobes (CZE); Patricie Srnská (CZE)	
19–20 August	St-Félicien Canada Cup XCO & XCC	(Canada) Saint-Félicien	1	Tyler Orschel (CAN) (XCC); Roxane Vermette (CAN) (XCC); Tyler Orschel (CAN) (XCO); Jocelyn Stel (CAN) (XCO)	Carson Beard (USA) (XCC); Léa Bouchard (CAN) (XCC); Victor Verreault (CAN) (XCO); Roxane Vermette (CAN) (XCO)	Victor Verreault (CAN) (XCC); Ophélie Grandmont (CAN) (XCC); Noah Ramsay (CAN) (XCO); Léa Bouchard (CAN) (XCO)	
19–20 August	Swiss Bike Cup Basel	(Switzerland) Basel	HC	Anton Cooper (NZL); Alessandra Keller (SUI)	Filippo Colombo (SUI); Jolanda Neff (SUI)	Ben Oliver (NZL); Linda Indergand (SUI)	
19–20 August	MTB French Cup XCO	(France) Les Menuires	1	Thomas Griot (FRA); Léna Gérault (FRA)	Jofre Cullell (ESP); Noémie Pan (FRA)	Mathis Azzaro (FRA); Line Burquier (FRA)	
20 August	Grand Prix Bihać	(Bosnia and Herzegovina) Bihać	1	Bartłomiej Wawak (POL); Yana Belomoyna (UKR)	Oleksandr Hudyma (UKR); Theresia Schwenk (GER)	Filippo Fontana (ITA); Aleksandra Podgórska (POL)	
20 August	Arad MTB Trophy – XCM	(Romania) Șiria	2	Milan Damek (CZE); Manuela Mureșan (ROU)	George-Bogdan Duca (ROU); Suzanne Hilbert (ROU)	Lucian Logigan (ROU)	
20 August	Yozgat MTB Cup	(Turkey) Yozgat	3	Furkan Akçam (TUR); Azize Bekar (TUR)	Emre Yavuz (TUR); Melike Yiğit (TUR)	Ahmet Akpınar (TUR); Helin Altekin (TUR)	
20 August	Górale na Start	(Poland) Boguszów-Gorce	3	Krzysztof Łukasik (POL); Antonina Białek (POL)	Paweł Bernas (POL); Klaudia Czabok (POL)	Piotr Kryński (POL); Zuzanna Krzystała (POL)	
20 August	Shimano MTB Liga #4 Sorø	(Denmark) Sorø	2	Oliver Sølvhøj (DEN); Malene Degn (DEN)	Bjørn Andreassen (DEN); Emma Lyngholm (DEN)	Mathias Pedersen (DEN); Line Mygdam (DEN)	
24–27 August	Anatolia MTB Stage Race – XCMS	(Turkey) Kırıkkale, Kırşehir, Nevşehir	S2	Furkan Akçam (TUR); Alina Sarkulova (KAZ)	Ahmet Akpınar (TUR); Azize Bekar (TUR)	Yegor Karassyov (KAZ); Alina Spirina (KAZ)	
25 August	CIMTB Taubaté: XCC Class 3	(Brazil) Taubaté	3	Cainã Guimarães (BRA); Isabella Lacerda (BRA)	Jhonnatan Botero (COL); Sabrina Oliveira (BRA)	Nicolas Rafhael Amancio (BRA); Ana Laura Oliveira (BRA)	
25–27 August	Siol International Mountain Bike Challenge 2023	(Malaysia) Kuching	2	Sheng Shan Chiang (TPE) (DHI); Eddyna Nasuhar (MAS) (DHI); Gart Gaerlan (PHI) (XCE) (XCE); Ahmad Syazrin Awang Ilah (MAS) (XCO); Tsai Ya Yu (TPE) (XCO)	Amer Akbar (MAS) (DHI) (DHI); Ahmad Syazrin Awang Ilah (MAS) (XCE) (XCE); Zulfikri Zulkifli (MAS) (XCO); Yonthanan Phonkla (THA) (XCO)	Yu Yu Lin (TPE) (DHI) (DHI); John Andre Aguja (PHI) (XCE) (XCE); Riyadh Hakim (SIN) (XCO); Shagne Paula Yaoyao (PHI) (XCO)	
27 August	Bike Race Langendorf	(Switzerland) Langendorf	3	Joris Ryf (SUI); Tina Züger (SUI)	Romain Debord (FRA); Cristel Hubacher (SUI)	Sven Olivetti (SUI); Iryna Shymanska (UKR)	
27 August	Copa K6 Naranjal XCO	(Paraguay) Naranjal	2	Esteban Moises Portillo (PAR); Carine Dreher de Ciriaco (PAR)	Lucas Bogado Hermann (PAR); Andrea María Romero (PAR)	Walter Adhemar Oberladstatter (PAR); Rita da Silva Borges (PAR)	
27 August	CIMTB Taubaté: XCO Class 1	(Brazil) Taubaté	1	Hilvar Malaver Calderón (COL); Isabella Lacerda (BRA)	Fabio Castañeda (COL); Karen Olímpio (BRA)	Jhonnatan Botero Villegas (COL); Gloria Garzón (COL)	

=== September ===
Date	Race Name	Location	Class	Winner	Second	Third	Ref
2 September	4# Copa Soul Sul Mineiro Internacional	(Brazil) Caxambu	2	José Gabriel Marques (BRA); Karen Olímpio (BRA)	Edson Gilmar de Rezende Junior (BRA); Isabella Lacerda (BRA)	Guilherme Müller (BRA); Stefânye Lindolfo (BRA)	
2 September	CykloOpawy MTB XCO Głuchołazy	(Poland) Głuchołazy	3	Krzysztof Łukasik (POL); Gabriela Wojtyła (POL)	Jan Zatloukal (CZE); Zuza Krzystała (POL)	Karol Ostaszewski (POL); Klaudia Czabok (POL)	
2–3 September	Buthiers MTB Races	(France) Buthiers	2	Yannis Musy (FRA); Flavie Guille (FRA)	Loan Cheneval (FRA); Constance Valentin (FRA)	Valentin Remondet (FRA); Coline Clauzure (FRA)	
2–3 September	Oslo Terrengsykkelfestival	(Norway) Oslo	1	Knut Røhme (NOR) (XCC); Ingrid Bøe Jacobsen (NOR) (XCC); Emil Hasund Eid (NOR) (XCO); Berit Nordsæter Resell (NOR) (XCO)	Sondre Rokke (NOR) (XCC); Linn Gustafzzon (SWE) (XCC); Knut Røhme (NOR) (XCO); Ingrid Bøe Jacobsen (NOR) (XCO)	Martin Farstadvoll (NOR) (XCC); Oda Laforce (NOR) (XCC); Sjur Holm Grøneng (NOR) (XCO); Oda Laforce (NOR) (XCO)	
3 September	ÖKK Bike Revolution Huttwil	(Switzerland) Huttwil	HC	Mathias Flückiger (SUI); Alessandra Keller (SUI)	Joel Roth (SUI); Kate Courtney (USA)	Mārtiņš Blūms (LVA); Sammie Maxwell (NZL)	
3 September	Kocaeli MTB Cup	(Turkey) Kocaeli	2	Ahmet Akpınar (TUR); Azize Bekar (TUR)	Emre Yuca (TUR); Helin Altekin (TUR)	Emre Yavuz (TUR); Iremnur Korkmaz (TUR)	
3–9 September	Momentum Medical Scheme Cape Pioneer Trek	(South Africa) Oudtshoorn	S1	Marco Joubert (RSA); Wessel Botha (RSA); Samantha Sanders (RSA); Kimberley Le Court (MRI)	Gert Heyns (RSA); Tristan Nortje (RSA); Hayley Smith (RSA); Sarah Hill (RSA)	Arno du Toit (RSA); Keagan Bontekoning (RSA); Kelsey van Schoor (RSA); Karla Stumpf (RSA)	
8–9 September	Copa Internacional Cable Carril 2023	(Argentina) Chilecito	2				
9 September	Hellenic XCE Series #3	(Greece) Sérres	3	Iraklis Balafas (GRE); Eleftheria Giachou (GRE)	Alexandros Karousos (GRE); Eirini Maria Karousou (GRE)	Dimitrios Antoniadis (GRE); Athina Tzoulaki (GRE)	
9 September	CST Singletrack MTB Marathon – XCM	(Slovakia) Košice	1	Matej Ulík (SVK); Janka Keseg Števková (SVK)	Tomaš Višňovský (SVK); Martina Krahulcová (SVK)	András Szatmáry (HUN); Barbara Benkó (HUN)	
9 September	Mythos Primiero Dolomiti – XCM	(Italy) Primiero San Martino di Castrozza	2	Diego Rosa (ITA); Giorgia Marchet (ITA)	Samuele Porro (ITA); Chiara Burato (ITA)	Casey South (SUI); Claudia Peretti (ITA)	
9 September	Copa Catalana Internacional Biking Point Barcelona	(Spain) Barcelona	2	Axel Roudil-Cortinat (FRA); Núria Bosch Picó (ESP)	Hugo Weiss (FRA); Erika Rodríguez Suárez (MEX)	Mario Sinués Micó (ESP); Nicole Castillo Parramón (ESP)	
9 September	Yenice MTB Cup	(Turkey) Yenice	2	Denis Sergiyenko (KAZ); Tatyana Geneleva (KAZ)	Furkan Akçam (TUR); Azize Bekar (TUR)	Yegor Karassyov (KAZ); Alina Sarkulova (KAZ)	
9–10 September	Ergotec – Majlen Sunshine Race	(Germany) Winterberg	2	Brian Schouteden (BEL) (XCC) (XCC); Rens Teunissen van Manen (NED) (XCO); Annemijn van Limpt (NED) (XCO)	Benjamin Muth (GER) (XCC) (XCC); Brian Schouteden (BEL) (XCO); Fenna Hoegee (NED) (XCO)	Luis Oßwald (GER) (XCC) (XCC); Benjamin Muth (GER) (XCO); Femke Mossinkoff (NED) (XCO)	
10 September	Hellenic Cup #5	(Greece) Sérres	2	Yaroslav Shvedov; Eleftheria Giachou (GRE)	Alexandros Athanasiadis (GER); Eirini Maria Karousou (GRE)	Dimitrios Antoniadis (GRE); Aikaterini Eleftheriadou (GRE)	
10 September	International XCO Vila do Conde	(Portugal) Vila do Conde	2	Roberto Ferreira (POR); Ana Santos (POR)	Mário Costa (POR); Joana Monteiro (POR)	João Rocha (POR); Maaris Meier (EST)	
15–17 September	iXS European Downhill Cup	(Switzerland) Verbier	1	Philip Atwill (GBR); Veronika Widmann (ITA)	Simon Maurer (GER); Kerstin Sallegger (AUT)	Felix Bauer (GER); Kine Haugom (NOR)	
15–17 September	MTB French Cup XCO/XCE	(France) Brouains	1	Killian Hampiaux (FRA) (XCE); Noémie Garnier (FRA) (XCE); Jens Schuermans (BEL) (XCO); Noémie Garnier (FRA) (XCO)	Athys Bedini (FRA) (XCE); Amélie Vazeille (FRA) (XCE); Martin Groslambert (FRA) (XCO); Lauriane Duraffourg (FRA) (XCO)	Maxence Lemardelé (FRA) (XCE); Coline Clauzure (FRA) (XCE); Nathan Cornillon (FRA) (XCO); Flavie Guille (FRA) (XCO)	
15–17 September	Copa Colombia MTB VI	(Colombia) Manizales	2	Jhonnatan Botero Villegas (COL) (XCC); Ana Maria Roa (COL) (XCC); Jhonnatan Botero Villegas (COL) (XCO); Gloria Garzón (COL) (XCO)	Ivan Felipe López Castañeda (COL) (XCC); Gloria Garzón (COL) (XCC); Juan Fernando Monroy (COL) (XCO); Ana Maria Roa (COL) (XCO)	Juan Fernando Monroy (COL) (XCC); Ana Sofía Villegas (COL) (XCC); Camilo Gómez (COL) (XCO); Camila Cagua (COL) (XCO)	
16 September	Dumanli MTB Cup	(Turkey) Erzincan	3	David Šulc (CZE); Tatyana Geneleva (KAZ)	Yegor Karassyov (KAZ); Alina Sarkulova (KAZ)	Denis Sergiyenko (KAZ); Azize Bekar (TUR)	
16 September	Prima Cup – Harrachov – XCM	(Czech Republic) Harrachov	2	Paweł Bernas (POL); Milena Kalašová (CZE)	Michał Glanz (POL); Aneta Hovorková (CZE)	Filip Adel (CZE)	
16 September	Taça Brasil de XCO – XCC – Rio de Janeiro	(Brazil) Rio de Janeiro	2	Ulan Bastos Galinski (BRA) (XCC); Karen Olímpio (BRA) (XCC); Henrique Avancini (BRA) (XCO); Karen Olímpio (BRA) (XCO)	Cainã Guimarães (BRA) (XCC); Sabrina Oliveira (BRA) (XCC); Ulan Bastos Galinski (BRA) (XCO); Giuliana Salvini (BRA) (XCO)	Sebastian Miranda (CHI) (XCC) (XCC); Ignacio Gallo Florido (CHI) (XCO); Sabrina Oliveira (BRA) (XCO)	
16 September	JBG2 Pressingowa Petarda MTB XCO Jastrzębie-Zdrój	(Poland) Jastrzębie-Zdrój	2	Krzysztof Łukasik (POL); Klaudia Czabok (POL)	Karol Ostaszewski (POL); Gabriela Wojtyła (POL)	Filip Helta (POL); Antonina Białek (POL)	
16–17 September	Karl XII Rittet	(Norway) Halden	1	Erik Hægstad (NOR) (XCC); Ingrid Bøe Jacobsen (NOR) (XCC); Mats Tubaas Glende (NOR) (XCO); Ingrid Bøe Jacobsen (NOR) (XCO)	Sondre Rokke (NOR) (XCC); Hedda Brenningen Bjørklund (NOR) (XCC); Erik Hægstad (NOR) (XCO); Berit Nordsæter Resell (NOR) (XCO)	Martin Farstadvoll (NOR) (XCC); Sigrid Andrea Fløgstad (NOR) (XCC); Sondre Rokke (NOR) (XCO); Elisabeth Sveum (NOR) (XCO)	
16–17 September	Hallbyrundan	(Sweden) Jönköping	2	André Eriksson (SWE) (XCC); Linn Gustafzzon (SWE) (XCC); André Eriksson (SWE) (XCO); Linn Gustafzzon (SWE) (XCO)	Martin Setterberg (SWE)(XCC); Emma Belforth (SWE) (XCC); Oscar Lind (SWE) (XCO); Emma Belforth (SWE) (XCO)	Casper Johansson (SWE) (XCC); Moa Gustafzzon (SWE) (XCC); Viktor Lindqvist (SWE) (XCO); Tilda Hylén (SWE) (XCO)	
17 September	2023 Oceania XCM Continental Championships	Australia	CC	Daniel McConnell (AUS); Samara Sheppard (NZL)	Jon Odams (AUS); Peta Mullens (AUS)	Kyle Ward (AUS); Gina Ricardo (AUS)	
17 September	Rouvy Velká Cena Vimperka	(Czech Republic) Vimperk	2	Bartłomiej Wawak (POL); Adéla Holubová (CZE)	Jaromír Skála (CZE); Patricie Srnská (CZE)	Lukáš Kobes (CZE); Nela Viktorová (CZE)	
17 September	Shimano MTB Liga #5 Vejle	(Denmark) Vejle	1	Tobias Lillelund (DEN); Malene Degn (DEN)	Frits Biesterbos (NED); Emma Lyngholm (DEN)	Tom Van Ingelgom (BEL); Line Mygdam (DEN)	
17 September	26. MTB Cross Country "Rund um den Roadlberg"	(Austria) Ottenschlag im Mühlkreis	2	Gregor Raggl (AUT); Vita Movrin (SVN)	Karl Markt (AUT); Andrea Kravanja (GER)	Kilian Feurstein (AUT); Jana Czeczinkarová (CZE)	
17 September	22° La Dario Acquaroli Internazionale	(Italy) Iseo	3	Jakob Dorigoni (ITA); Claudia Peretti (ITA)	Nadir Colledani (ITA); Chiara Burato (ITA)	Jacopo Billi (ITA); Gaia Tormena (ITA)	
17 September	La Forestiere – XCM	(France) Les Rousses	HC	Hugo Drechou (FRA); Stefanie Zahno (SUI)	Martin Frey (GER); Estelle Morel (FRA)	José Dias (POR); Meritxell Figueras (ESP)	
17 September	Copa Ayolas XCO	(Paraguay) Ayolas	2	Mario Arnold (PAR); Agustina Quirós (ARG)	Esteban Portillo Fleitas (PAR); Sara María Torres (PAR)	Antonio Alfonso Florentín (PAR); Silvia Rodas Maldonado (PAR)	
17 September	Dumanli MTB Cup	(Turkey) Erzincan	2	Denis Sergiyenko (KAZ); Tatyana Geneleva (KAZ)	David Šulc (CZE); Alina Sarkulova (KAZ)	Emre Yuka (TUR); Alina Spirina (KAZ)	
22 September	CIMTB Congonhas: XCC Class 3	(Brazil) Congonhas	3	Ulan Bastos Galinski (BRA); Karen Olímpio (BRA)	Cainã Guimarães (BRA); Isabella Lacerda (BRA)	Sebastian Miranda (CHI); Sabrina Oliveira (BRA)	
22 September	Sultan Tahti MTB Cup	(Turkey) Erzurum	3	Tomer Zaltsman (ISR); Na'ama Noyman (ISR)	David Šulc (CZE); Jana Czeczinkarová (CZE)	Ahmet Akpınar (TUR); Azize Bekar (TUR)	
22–24 September	Copa Colombia MTB VII	(Colombia) Pereira	2	Jhonnatan Botero Villegas (COL) (XCC); Gloria Garzón (COL) (XCC); Jhonnatan Botero Villegas (COL) (XCO); Gloria Garzón (COL) (XCO)	Juan Fernando Monroy () (XCC); Ana Maria Roa (COL) (XCC); Juan Fernando Monroy (COL) (XCO); Ana Maria Roa (COL) (XCO)	Ivan Felipe Lopez (COL) (XCC); Camila Cagua Gonzalez (COL) (XCC); Jonathan David Cantor (COL) (XCO); Ana Sofía Villegas (COL) (XCO)	
23 September	MTB Eliminator Girona - XCE	(Spain) Girona	3	Sondre Rokke (NOR); Gaia Tormena (ITA)	Lorenzo Serres (FRA); Iara Caetano Leite (BRA)	Theo Hauser (AUT); Annemoon van Dienst (NED)	
23 September	MTB Academy Cup	(Romania) Câmpulung	2	Ede Molnár (ROU); Manuela Mureșan (ROU)	Nathan Célié (FRA); Suzanne Hilbert (ROU)	Furkan Akçam (TUR); Eszter Bereczki (ROU)	
23 September	Ejder 3200 MTB Cup	(Turkey) Erzurum	3	Tomer Zaltsman (ISR); Jana Czeczinkarová (CZE)	David Šulc (CZE); Na'ama Noyman (ISR)	Ahmet Akpınar (TUR); Azize Bekar (TUR)	
23 September	MTB Eliminator Turieckap - XCE	(Slovakia) Turčianske Teplice	3	Attila Gerely (HUN)	Šimon Němec (CZE)	Matúš Mazan (SVK)	
23 September	Scott Marathon Girona - XCM	(Spain) Girona	1	Hans Becking (NED); Tessa Kortekaas (NED)	Hugo Drechou (FRA); Meritxell Figueras (ESP)	José Dias (POR); Janina Wüst (SUI)	
23 September	Nockstein Trophy	(Austria) Koppl	2	Gregor Raggl (AUT); Gabriela Wojtyła (POL)	Benjamin Krüger (GER); Antonia Weeger (GER)	Kilian Feurstein (AUT); Clara Sommer (AUT)	
23–24 September	Portugal Cup XCO - Avis International XCO	(Portugal) Avis	2	Diogo Neves (POR); Raquel Queirós (POR)	Ricardo Marinheiro (POR); Ana Santos (POR)	Mário Costa (POR); Joana Monteiro (POR)	
23–24 September	Swiss Bike Cup Gstaad	(Switzerland) Gstaad	1	Filippo Colombo (SUI); Linda Indergand (SUI)	Maximilian Brandl (GER); Noëlle Buri (SUI)	Marcel Guerrini (SUI); Ronja Eibl (GER)	
24 September	Paris 2024 Test Event - MTB XCO	(France) Paris	TE	Victor Koretzky (FRA); Loana Lecomte (FRA)	Anton Cooper (NZL); Laura Stigger (AUT)	Nino Schurter (SUI); Pauline Ferrand-Prévot (FRA)	
24 September	CIMTB Congonhas: XCO Class 2	(Brazil) Congonhas	2	Ulan Bastos Galinski (BRA); Karen Olímpio (BRA)	José Gabriel Marques (BRA); Giuliana Salvini (BRA)	Cainã Guimarães (BRA); Isabella Lacerda (BRA)	
24 September	UCI XCO Predolac - Neretva Bike Weekend	(Croatia) Metković	1	Emanuele Huez (ITA); Giorgia Marchet (ITA)	Filip Helta (POL); Aleksandra Podgórska (POL)	Christopher Dawson (IRL); Lucrezia Braida (ITA)	
24 September	Shimano Mtb Liga #6 Copenhagen	(Denmark) Copenhagen	2	Gustav Heby Pedersen (DEN); Kirstine Holt (DEN)	Frits Biesterbos (NED); Klara Sofie Hansen (DEN)	André Eriksson (SWE); Janni Spangsberg (DEN)	
24 September	Shimano Supercup Girona	(Spain) Girona	2	Gerardo Ulloa (MEX); Sophie von Berswordt (NED)	Hugo Drechou (FRA); Ingrid Bøe Jacobsen (NOR)	Jofre Cullell (ESP); Céline Bouthonnier (FRA)	
24 September	Palandöken MTB Cup	(Turkey) Erzurum	1	Tomer Zaltsman (ISR); Na'ama Noyman (ISR)	David Šulc (CZE); Jana Czeczinkarová (CZE)	Ahmet Akpınar (TUR); Azize Bekar (TUR)	
24 September	Coupe du Japon Misaka International	(Japan) Shimonoseki	3	Tatsuumi Soejima (JPN); Urara Kawaguchi (JPN)	Takaaki Takuma (JPN); Yui Ishida (JPN)	Kentaro Matsuda (JPN); Sumie Aoki (JPN)	
25 September	Cycling at the 2022 Asian Games	(China) Chun'an County	JR	Mi Jiujiang (CHN); Li Hongfeng (CHN)	Yuan Jinwei (CHN); Ma Caixia (CHN)	Toki Sawada (JPN); Faranak Partoazar (IRI)	
29 September	City Mountainbike - XCC	(Spain) Barcelona	3	Sondre Rokke (NOR); Gaia Tormena (ITA)	Nils-Obed Riecker (GER); Franziska Koch (GER)	Jakob Klemenčič (SVN); Katharina Sadnik (AUT)	
29 September – 1 October	iXS Downhill Cup	(Switzerland) Bellwald	2	Simon Maurer (GER); Kine Haugom (NOR)	Yannick Baechler (SUI); Jolanda Kiener (SUI)	Cédric Taillefer (FRA); Delia da Mocogno (SUI)	
30 September	Rize MTB Cup	(Turkey) Rize	2	Tomer Zaltsman (ISR); Ronja Eibl (GER)	David Šulc (CZE); Jana Czeczinkarová (CZE)	Ahmet Akpınar (TUR); Romi Veldnizki (ISR)	
30 September – 1 October	Copa Internacional Santa Maria de Punilla	(Argentina) Santa María de Punilla	2				

=== October ===
Date	Race Name	Location	Class	Winner	Second	Third	Ref
1 October	Extreme sur loue - XCM	(France) Ornans	HC	Martin Frey (GER); Estelle Morel (FRA)	Hansueli Stauffer (SUI); Kim Ames (GER)	Urs Huber (SUI); Alessia Nay (SUI)	
1 October	76 Indonesia Downhill	(Indonesia) Kudus	1	Rendy Varera Sanjaya (INA); Ayu Triya Andriana (INA)	Agung Priyo Apriliano (INA); Milatul Khaqimah (INA)	Mohammad Abdul Hakim (INA); Riska Amelia Agustina (INA)	
1 October	Trans Itapua Bike - XCM	(Paraguay) Carmen del Paraná/San Juan del Paraná	2	Mario Antonio Arnold Prieto (PAR); Sara Maria Torres (PAR)	Juan Villamayor (PAR); Agustina Quirós (ARG)	Sergio Ramirez Martinez (PAR); Silvia María Rodas (PAR)	
1 October	XXII Ruta BTT Villa de Paterna - XCM	(Spain) Paterna del Campo	1	Francisco Herrero Casas (ESP); Tessa Kortekaas (NED)	Victor Manuel Fernández (ESP); Cristina Morán (ESP)	Sergio García (ESP); María Díaz (ESP)	
1 October	Rize MTB Cup	(Turkey) Rize	1	Tomer Zaltsman (ISR); Ronja Eibl (GER)	David Šulc (CZE); Jana Czeczinkarová (CZE)	Nathan Célié (FRA); Romi Veldnizki (ISR)	
6 October	Roc d'Azur	(France) Fréjus	HC	Andreas Seewald (GER); Kataržina Sosna (LTU)	Leonardo Páez (COL); Tatiana Tournut (FRA)	Samuele Porro (ESP); Estelle Morel (FRA)	
6–8 October	Copa Chile Internacional Petorca	(Chile) Petorca	2	Ignacio Gallo Florido (CHI) (XCC); María Castro (CHI) (XCC); Agustín Durán (ARG); Catalina Vidaurre (CHI)	Nicolás Delich Pardo (CHI) (XCC) (XCC); Ignacio Gallo Florido (CHI); Yarela González Obando (CHI)	Agustín Durán (ARG) (XCC) (XCC); Sebastian Miranda Maldonado (CHI); María Castro (CHI)	
7 October	Tierra Estella Epic	(Spain) Ayegui – Aiegi	1	Pablo Rodríguez (ESP); Meritxell Figueras (ESP)	Ismael Esteban (ESP); Ainara Elbusto (ESP)	Roberto Bou Martín (ESP); Edurne Izcue Ros (ESP)	
11 October	Greek MTB Series – Salamina Epic Race #7	(Greece) Salamis Island	1	Filippo Colombo (SUI); Janika Lõiv (EST)	Mathis Azzaro (FRA); Leonie Daubermann (GER)	Georg Egger (GER); Paula Gorycka (POL)	
12 October	Greek MTB Series – Salamina Epic Race #8	(Greece) Salamis Island	1	Christopher Blevins (USA); Janika Lõiv (EST)	Krzysztof Łukasik (POL); Leonie Daubermann (GER)	Georg Egger (GER); Seraina Leugger (SUI)	
12–15 October	2023 Pan-American DHI Continental Championships	Peru	CC	Juan Fernando Muñoz (COL); Valentina Roa (COL)	Sebastian Holguin (COL); Mariana Salazar (ESA)	Felipe Agurto Galleguillos (CHI); Christine Lewis (MEX)	
13–15 October	MTB Festival	(Brazil) Mairiporã	1	Henrique Avancini (BRA) (XCC); Raiza Goulão (BRA) (XCC); José Gabriel Marques (BRA); Raiza Goulão (BRA)	José Gabriel Marques (BRA) (XCC); Karen Olímpio (BRA) (XCC); Diego Arias (COL); Karen Olímpio (BRA)	Ulan Bastos Galinski (BRA) (XCC); Isabella Lacerda (BRA) (XCC); Gustavo Xavier de Oliveira (BRA); Giuliana Salvini Morgen (BRA)	
14–15 October	Coupe du Japon Kumamoto Yoshimuta International	Japan	3	Tatsuumi Soejima (JPN); Yui Ishida (JPN)	Yasuaki Nishiyama (JPN); Sumie Aoki (JPN)	Motoshi Kadota (JPN)	
14–15 October	Copa Mezuena Specialized V4	(Colombia) Cajicá	3	Javier Torres (COL); Zharick Madariaga (COL)	Yimer Alejandro Antonio (COL); Natalia Duarte (COL)	Daniel Arevalo (COL)	
15 October	LaTramun SingleTrackMarathon XXV Edition - XCM	(Spain) Girona	1	Hugo Drechou (FRA); Meritxell Figueras Garangou (ESP)	Martin Frey (GER); Bettina Janas (GER)	Peeter Pruus (EST); Cristina Morán Roza (ESP)	
15 October	Greek MTB Series – Salamina MTB Race #9	(Greece) Salamis Island	1	Christopher Blevins (USA); Janika Lõiv (EST)	Filippo Colombo (SUI); Yana Belomoyna (UKR)	Krzysztof Łukasik (POL); Paula Gorycka (POL)	
15 October	Castro Legend Cup - X Legend d'Italia - XCM	(Italy) Castro	2	Andreas Seewald (GER); Kataržina Sosna (LTU)	Héctor Leonardo Páez (COL); Chiara Burato (ITA)	Fabian Rabensteiner (ITA)	
15 October	XCO Losinj	(Croatia) Mali Lošinj	2	Emanuele Huez (ITA); Giorgia Marchet (ITA)	Rok Naglič (SVN); Gabriela Wojtyła (POL)	Tomáš Ševců (CZE); Lucrezia Braida (ITA)	
19 October	Greek MTB Series – Sparta MTB Race #3	(Greece) Sparti	1	Simon Andreassen (DEN); Paula Gorycka (POL)	Luca Schätti (SUI); Leonie Daubermann (GER)	Bartłomiej Wawak (POL); Yana Belomoyna (UKR)	
20 October	Greek MTB Series – Sparta MTB Race #4	(Greece) Sparti	1	Simon Andreassen (DEN); Leonie Daubermann (GER)	Bartłomiej Wawak (POL); Paula Gorycka (POL)	Max Foidl (AUT); Lia Schrievers (GER)	
20–22 October	Japan Mountain Bike Cup	(Japan) Izu	1	Mathis Azzaro (FRA); Rebecca Henderson (AUS)	Filippo Colombo (SUI); Akari Kobayashi (JPN)	Juri Zanotti (ITA); Shagne Yao (PHI)	
22–28 October	Brasil Ride Bahia - XCMS	(Brazil) Arraial d'Ajuda/Guaratinguetá	S1	Tiago Ferreira (POR); Tessa Kortekaas (NED)	Henrique Avancini (BRA); Mónica Calderon (COL)	Simon Stiebjahn (GER); Luiza Euzébio de Souza (BRA)	
26–29 October	Asian Continental Championships - XCO - DHI - XCR - XCE	(India) Thiruvananthapuram	CC	Sheng Shan Chiang (TPE) (DHI); Vipavee Deekaballes (THA) (DHI) (XCO) (XCO) (XCR) (XCE) (XCE)	Methasit Boonsane (THA) (DHI); Milatul Khaqimah (INA) (DHI) (XCO) (XCO) (XCR) (XCE) (XCE)	Rendy Varera Sanjaya (INA) (DHI); Riska Amelia Agustina (INA) (DHI) (XCO) (XCO) (XCR) (XCE) (XCE)	
27 October	MTB Eliminator Sakarya - XCE	(Turkey) Sakarya	3	Daniel Noyola (MEX); Marion Fromberger (GER)	Simon Gegenheimer (GER); Annemoon van Dienst (NED)	Titouan Perrin-Ganier (FRA); Marcela Lima (BRA)	
28 October	Copa Chile Angol CMPC 2023	(Chile) Angol	2	Jonathan David Cantor (COL); Catalina Vidaurre (CHI)	Ignacio Gallo (CHI); Yarela González Obando (CHI)	Patricio Farías Díaz (CHI); Laura Camila Cagua (COL)	
29 October	UEC Mountainbike XCE European Continental Championships	(Turkey) Sakarya	CC	Ede-Károly Molnár (ROU); Gaia Tormena (ITA)	Titouan Perrin-Ganier (FRA); Marion Fromberger (GER)	Nils Riecker (GER); Annemoon van Dienst (NED)	
29 October	XIII Maraton BTT Sierra de Cazorla - XCM	(Spain) Cazorla	2	Víctor Manuel Fernández (ESP); Pilar Fernández (ESP)	Javier Poza Ruiz (ESP); Cristina Morán Roza (ESP)	Jorge Lamiel Repullés (ESP); Ada Xinxó (ESP)	

=== November ===
Date	Race Name	Location	Class	Winner	Second	Third	Ref
4–5 November	Desafio CIMTB - XCC	(Brazil) Poços de Caldas	3	Jose Gabriel Marques (BRA); Raphaella Pelaquim (BRA)	Sherman Trezza de Paiva (BRA); Ana Laura Ferreira Bueno (BRA)	Renato Rezende (BRA); Júnia Roberta da Costa Coutinho (BRA)	
11–12 November	Copa Internacional UCI Santa Maria	(Argentina) Santa María	1	Catriel Soto (ARG) (XCC); Agustina Quirós (ARG) (XCC); Catriel Soto (ARG) (XCO; Agustina Quirós (ARG) (XCO)	Joaquín Gabriel Vera (ARG) (XCC); Sabrina Guadalupe Nieva (ARG) (XCC); Jorge Álvaro Macías (ARG) (XCO); Sabrina Guadalupe Nieva (ARG) (XCO)	Diego Fontan (ARG) (XCC) (XCC); Joaquín Gabriel Vera (ARG) (XCO); Veronica Elizabeth Centeno (ARG) (XCO)	
11–12 November	Copa Chile Internacional Angostura	(Chile) Angostura (Mostazal)	2	Patricio Farías (CHI) (XCC); Yarela González Obando (CHI) (XCC); Martín Vidaurre (CHI) (XCO); Catalina Vidaurre (CHI) (XCO)	Diego del Campo (CHI) (XCC); María Constanza Pezzotti (CHI) (XCC); Sebastián Miranda Maldonado (CHI) (XCO); Yarela González Obando (CHI) (XCO)	Sebastián Miranda Maldonado (CHI) (XCC) (XCC); Patricio Farías (CHI) (XCO); María Castro (CHI) (XCO)	
12 November	UCI MTB Eliminator World Championships	(Indonesia) Palangka Raya	WC	Titouan Perrin-Ganier (FRA); Gaia Tormena (ITA)	Lorenzo Serres (FRA); Dara Latifah (INA)	Sondre Rokke (NOR); Annemoon van Dienst (NED)	
18 November	UCI Pump Track World Championships	(Austria) Ötztal	WC	Alec Bob (USA); Christa von Niederhäusern (SUI)	Mattia Costerman (ITA); Sabina Košárková (CZE)	Eddy Clerté (FRA); Alina Beck (GER)	
26 November	Hellenic XCC Series #3	(Greece) Larissa	3	Dimitrios Antoniadis (GRE); Alexandra Adam (GRE)	Charoun Molla (GRE); Aikaterini Eleftheriadou (GRE)	Nikolaos Georgiadis (GRE); Konstantina Karali (GRE)	

=== December ===
Date	Race Name	Location	Class	Winner	Second	Third	Ref
1–3 December	Final Down Hill Guatemala	Guatemala City	2	Tyler Ervin (USA); Valentina Roa (COL)	Sebastian Holguin (COL); Rachel Pageau (CAN)	Camilo Sánchez Salazar (COL); Ariana Soto (USA)	

== World Cup ==
=== 2023 XCO World Cup ===
Nation Date	Champion	Second place	Third place
Czech Republic; 12–14 May	Tom Pidcock (GBR); Puck Pieterse (NED)	Joshua Dubau (FRA); Pauline Ferrand-Prévot (FRA)	Nino Schurter (SUI); Loana Lecomte (FRA)
Switzerland; 9–11 June	Nino Schurter (SUI); Loana Lecomte (FRA)	Alan Hatherly (RSA); Anne Terpstra (NED)	Jordan Sarrou (FRA); Alessandra Keller (SUI)
Austria; 15–18 June	Lars Forster (SUI); Puck Pieterse (NED)	Luca Schwarzbauer (GER); Mona Mitterwallner (AUT)	Ondřej Cink (CZE); Laura Stigger (AUT)
Italy; 30 June – 2 July	Nino Schurter (SUI); Puck Pieterse (NED)	Mathias Flückiger (SUI); Martina Berta (ITA)	Vlad Dascălu (ROU); Rebecca Henderson (AUS)
Andorra; 25–27 August	Mathias Flückiger (SUI); Mona Mitterwallner (AUT)	Thomas Griot (FRA); Alessandra Keller (SUI)	Tom Pidcock (GBR); Pauline Ferrand-Prévot (FRA)
France; 7–17 September	Victor Koretzky (FRA); Mona Mitterwallner (AUT)	Nino Schurter (SUI); Puck Pieterse (NED)	Vlad Dascălu (ROU); Pauline Ferrand-Prévot (FRA)
United States; 28 September – 1 October	Jordan Sarrou (FRA); Laura Stigger (AUT)	Nino Schurter (SUI); Loana Lecomte (FRA)	Marcel Guerrini (SUI); Martina Berta (ITA)
Canada; 6–8 October	Tom Pidcock (GBR); Loana Lecomte (FRA)	Mathias Flückiger (SUI); Jenny Rissveds (SWE)	Marcel Guerrini (SUI); Puck Pieterse (NED)

=== 2023 XCC World Cup ===
Nation Date	Champion	Second place	Third place
Czech Republic; 12–14 May	Tom Pidcock (GBR); Laura Stigger (AUT)	Luca Schwarzbauer (GER); Alessandra Keller (SUI)	Nino Schurter (SUI); Sina Frei (SUI)
Switzerland; 9–11 June	Luca Schwarzbauer (GER); Jenny Rissveds (SWE)	Jordan Sarrou (FRA); Alessandra Keller (SUI)	Sebastian Fini Carstensen (DEN); Pauline Ferrand-Prévot (FRA)
Austria; 15–18 June	Jordan Sarrou (FRA); Pauline Ferrand-Prévot (FRA)	Luca Schwarzbauer (GER); Puck Pieterse (NED)	Mārtiņš Blūms (LVA); Evie Richards (GBR)
Italy; 30 June – 2 July	Luca Schwarzbauer (GER); Laura Stigger (AUT)	Alan Hatherly (RSA); Puck Pieterse (NED)	Joshua Dubau (FRA); Pauline Ferrand-Prévot (FRA)
Andorra; 25–27 August	Luca Schwarzbauer (GER); Alessandra Keller (SUI)	Nino Schurter (SUI); Evie Richards (GBR)	Jordan Sarrou (FRA); Puck Pieterse (NED)
France; 7–17 September	Victor Koretzky (FRA); Puck Pieterse (NED)	Jordan Sarrou (FRA); Evie Richards (GBR)	Luca Schwarzbauer (GER); Alessandra Keller (SUI)
United States; 28 September – 1 October	Victor Koretzky (FRA); Evie Richards (GBR)	Jordan Sarrou (FRA); Puck Pieterse (NED)	Luca Schwarzbauer (GER); Rebecca Henderson (AUS)
Canada; 6–8 October	Victor Koretzky (FRA); Laura Stigger (AUT)	Jordan Sarrou (FRA); Loana Lecomte (FRA)	Christopher Blevins (USA); Rebecca Henderson (AUS)

=== 2023 XCM World Cup ===
Nation Date	Champion	Second place	Third place
Czech Republic; 12–14 May	Fabian Rabensteiner (ITA); Lejla Njemčević (BIH)	Nicolas Samparisi (ITA); Kataržina Sosna (LTU)	Simon Stiebjahn (GER); Irina Lützelschwab (SUI)
Italy; 3–4 June	Diego Arias (COL); Adelheid Morath (GER)	Martin Stošek (CZE); Lejla Njemčević (BIH)	Fabian Rabensteiner (ITA); Vera Looser (NAM)
France; 7–17 September	Héctor Leonardo Páez (COL); Vera Looser (NAM)	Diego Rosa (ITA); Lejla Njemčević (BIH)	Andreas Seewald (GER); Irina Lützelschwab (SUI)
United States; 28 September – 1 October	Simon Stiebjahn (GER); Hannah Otto (USA)	Axel Roudil-Cortinat (FRA); Haley Smith (CAN)	Casey South (SUI); Kataržina Sosna (LTU)

=== 2023 E-MTB World Cup ===
Nation Date	Champion	Second place	Third place
Monaco; 20 May	Jérôme Gilloux (FRA); Nicole Göldi (SUI)	Joris Ryf (SUI); Justine Tonso (FRA)	Hugo Pigeon (FRA); Sofia Wiedenroth (GER)
Monaco; 21 May	Emeric Ienzer (FRA); Justine Tonso (FRA)	Hugo Pigeon (FRA); Nicole Göldi (SUI)	Jérôme Gilloux (FRA); Anna Spielmann (AUT)
Italy; 10 June	Jérôme Gilloux (FRA); Nathalie Schneitter (SUI)	Robert Williams (GBR); Justine Tonso (FRA)	Martino Fruet (ITA); Sofia Wiedenroth (GER)
Italy; 11 June	Théo Charmes (FRA); Nicole Göldi (SUI)	Jérôme Gilloux (FRA); Nathalie Schneitter (SUI)	Joris Ryf (SUI); Anna Spielmann (AUT)
Italy; 15 July	Jérôme Gilloux (FRA); Sofia Wiedenroth (GER)	Joris Ryf (SUI); Nathalie Schneitter (SUI)	Heiko Hog (GER); Justine Tonso (FRA)
Italy; 16 July	Joris Ryf (SUI); Justine Tonso (FRA)	Jérôme Gilloux (FRA); Nathalie Schneitter (SUI)	Théo Charmes (FRA); Sofia Wiedenroth (GER)
Belgium; 29 August	Joris Ryf (SUI); Justine Tonso (FRA)	Mirko Tabacchi (ITA); Sofia Wiedenroth (GER)	Jérôme Gilloux (FRA); Antonia Daubermann (GER)
Belgium; 30 August	Joris Ryf (SUI); Sofia Wiedenroth (GER)	Jérôme Gilloux (FRA); Justine Tonso (FRA)	Mirko Tabacchi (ITA); Antonia Daubermann (GER)
Germany; 2 September	Jérôme Gilloux (FRA); Justine Tonso (FRA)	Joris Ryf (SUI); Sofia Wiedenroth (GER)	Théo Charmes (FRA); Antonia Daubermann (GER)
Germany; 3 September	Jérôme Gilloux (FRA); Justine Tonso (FRA)	Joris Ryf (SUI); Sofia Wiedenroth (GER)	Mirko Tabacchi (ITA); Antonia Daubermann (GER)
Spain; 22 September	Jérôme Gilloux (FRA); Sofia Wiedenroth (GER)	Joris Ryf (SUI); Justine Tonso (FRA)	Mirko Tabacchi (ITA); Barbora Vojta (CZE)
Spain; 23 September	Jérôme Gilloux (FRA); Justine Tonso (FRA)	Joris Ryf (SUI); Anna Spielmann (AUT)	Lluc Coma Macià (ESP); Barbora Vojta (CZE)
Spain; 21 October	Jérôme Gilloux (FRA); Anna Spielmann (AUT)	Mirko Tabacchi (ITA); Nathalie Schneitter (SUI)	Guillem Cassú (ESP); Sofia Wiedenroth (GER)
Spain; 22 October			

=== 2023 XCE World Cup ===
Nation Date	Champion	Second place	Third place
Turkey; 21 May	Titouan Perrin-Ganier (FRA); Marion Fromberger (GER)	Simon Gegenheimer (GER); Annemoon van Dienst (NED)	Quentin Schrotzenberger (FRA); Didi de Vries (NED)
Belgium; 4 June	Titouan Perrin-Ganier (FRA); Gaia Tormena (ITA)	Jarne Vandersteen (BEL); Shanyl De Schoesitter (BEL)	Simon Gegenheimer (GER); Line Mygdam (DEN)
Germany; 15 July	Felix Klausmann (GER); Lia Schrievers (GER)	Titouan Perrin-Ganier (FRA); Gaia Tormena (ITA)	Killian Demangeon (FRA); Lina Huber (GER)
Belgium; 13 August	Sondre Rokke (NOR); Gaia Tormena (ITA)	Lorenzo Serres (FRA); Marion Fromberger (GER)	Quentin Schrotzenberger (FRA); Agnes Abrahamsson (SWE)
Spain; 29 September	Simon Gegenheimer (GER); Gaia Tormena (ITA)	Lorenzo Serres (FRA); Marion Fromberger (GER)	Theo Hauser (AUT); Katharina Sadnik (AUT)

=== 2023 DHI World Cup ===
Nation Date	Champion	Second place	Third place
Switzerland; 10 June	Jordan Williams (GBR); Rachel Atherton (GBR)	Loris Vergier (FRA); Camille Balanche (SUI)	Loïc Bruni (FRA); Nina Hoffmann (GER)
Austria; 15–18 June	Andreas Kolb (AUT); Valentina Höll (AUT)	Loïc Bruni (FRA); Camille Balanche (SUI)	Jackson Goldstone (CAN); Rachel Atherton (GBR)
Italy; 30 June – 2 July	Jackson Goldstone (CAN); Valentina Höll (AUT)	Finn Iles (CAN); Camille Balanche (SUI)	Thibaut Dapréla (FRA); Jess Blewitt (NZL)
Andorra; 25–27 August	Thibaut Dapréla (FRA); Nina Hoffmann (GER)	Greg Minnaar (RSA); Valentina Höll (AUT)	Finn Iles (CAN); Tahnée Seagrave (GBR)
France; 3 September	Loïc Bruni (FRA); Valentina Höll (AUT)	Dakotah Norton (USA); Nina Hoffmann (GER)	Laurie Greenland (GBR); Marine Cabirou (FRA)
France; 7–17 September	Benoît Coulanges (FRA); Marine Cabirou (FRA)	Andreas Kolb (AUT); Monika Hrastnik (SVN)	Loris Vergier (FRA); Nina Hoffmann (GER)
United States; 28 September – 1 October	Oisin O'Callaghan (IRL); Marine Cabirou (FRA)	Rónán Dunne (IRL); Nina Hoffmann (GER)	Dakotah Norton (USA); Valentina Höll (AUT)
Canada; 6–8 October	Jackson Goldstone (CAN); Valentina Höll (AUT)	Ethan Craik (GBR); Nina Hoffmann (GER)	Loïc Bruni (FRA); Veronika Widmann (ITA)

=== 2023 Enduro World Cup ===
Nation Date	Champion	Second place	Third place
Australia; 25–26 March	Luke Meier-Smith (AUS); Isabeau Courdurier (FRA)	Daniel Booker (AUS); Morgane Charre (FRA)	Connor Fearon (AUS); Ella Conolly (GBR)
Australia; 1–2 April	Richie Rude (USA); Rebecca Baraona (GBR)	Sławomir Łukasik (POL); Harriet Harnden (GBR)	Jesse Melamed (CAN); Ella Conolly (GBR)
Italy; 3–4 June	Jesse Melamed (CAN); Morgane Charre (FRA)	Rhys Verner (CAN); Gloria Scarsi (ITA)	Alex Rudeau (FRA); Isabeau Courdurier (FRA)
Austria; 15–18 June	Rhys Verner (CAN); Isabeau Courdurier (FRA)	Richie Rude (USA); Gloria Scarsi (ITA)	Alex Rudeau (FRA); Morgane Charre (FRA)
Italy; 24–25 June	Matt Walker (NZL); Isabeau Courdurier (FRA)	Alex Rudeau (FRA); Morgane Charre (FRA)	Richie Rude (USA); Mélanie Pugin (FRA)
France; 1 September	Youn Deniaud (FRA); Isabeau Courdurier (FRA)	Alex Rudeau (FRA); Morgane Charre (FRA)	Louis Jeandel (FRA); Ella Conolly (GBR)
France; 7–17 September	Jesse Melamed (CAN); Morgane Charre (FRA)	Alex Rudeau (FRA); Isabeau Courdurier (FRA)	Richie Rude (USA); Harriet Harnden (GBR)

=== 2023 Enduro Electric World Cup ===
Nation Date	Champion	Second place	Third place
Italy; 3–4 June	Fabien Barel (FRA); Laura Charles (FRA)	Antoine Rogge (FRA); Florencia Espiñeira Herrero (CHI)	Florian Nicolai (FRA); Tracy Moseley (GBR)
(Austria); 15–18 June	(France) Fabien Barel (Chile) Florencia Espiñeira Herrero	(Australia) Michael Hannah (Germany) Ines Thoma	(Portugal) Tiago Ladeira (United Kingdom) Tracy Moseley
Italy; 24–25 June	Kévin Marry (FRA); Laura Charles (FRA)	Àlex Marín (ESP); Florencia Espiñeira Herrero (CHI)	Hugo Pigeon (FRA); Ines Thoma (GER)
France; 1–3 September	Fabien Barel (FRA); Florencia Espiñeira Herrero (CHI)	Àlex Marín (ESP); Tracy Moseley (GBR)	Tiago Ladeira (POR); Laura Charles (FRA)
France; 7–17 September	Kévin Marry (FRA); Florencia Espiñeira Herrero (CHI)	Tiago Ladeira (POR); Tracy Moseley (GBR)	Michael Hannah (AUS); Ines Thoma (GER)

== 2023 UCI Mountain Bike World Championships ==
=== Men's events ===
Event	Gold		Silver		Bronze	
Cross-country Olympic	Tom Pidcock (GBR)	1:22:09	Sam Gaze (NZL)	1:22:28	Nino Schurter (SUI)	1:22:43
Cross-country short track	Sam Gaze (NZL)	20:27	Victor Koretzky (FRA)	20:27	Tom Pidcock (GBR)	20:29
Cross-country marathon	Henrique Avancini (BRA)	4:14:42	Martin Stošek (CZE)	+0:28	Lukas Baum (GER)	+1:43
Electric MTB Cross-country	Joris Ryf (SUI)	58:29	Hugo Pigeon (FRA)	58:50	Jérôme Gilloux (FRA)	1:00:07
Downhill	Charlie Hatton (GBR)	4:26.747	Andreas Kolb (AUT)	+ 0.599	Laurie Greenland (GBR)	+ 1.229

=== Women's events ===
Event	Gold		Silver		Bronze	
Cross-country Olympic	Pauline Ferrand-Prévot (FRA)	1:24:14	Loana Lecomte (FRA)	1:25:28	Puck Pieterse (NED)	1:25:55
Cross-country short track	Pauline Ferrand-Prévot (FRA)	21:17	Puck Pieterse (NED)	21:21	Evie Richards (GBR)	21:30
Cross-country marathon	Mona Mitterwallner (AUT)	5:07:50	Candice Lill (RSA)	+0:54	Adelheid Morath (GER)	+9:50
Electric MTB Cross-country	Nathalie Schneitter (SUI)	52:23	Sofia Wiedenroth (GER)	53:23	Justine Tonso (FRA)	53:57
Downhill	(Austria) Valentina Höll	4:58.242	(Switzerland) Camille Balanche	+ 2.020	(France) Marine Cabirou	+ 2.361

=== Mixed events ===
Event	Gold	Silver	Bronze
Mixed Cross Country
SUI; Dario Lillo; Nicolas Halter; Linda Indergand; Ronja Blöchlinger; Anina Hutter; Nino Schurter	1:05:42		
FRA; Adrien Boichis; Julien Hémon; Loana Lecomte; Line Burquier; Anaïs Moulin; Jordan Sarrou	1:05:51		
DEN; Tobias Lillelund; Albert Withen Philipsen; Julie Lillelund; Sofie Heby Pedersen; Caroline Bohé; Sebastian Fini Carstensen	1:06:23		
