= 2022 UCI Mountain Bike World Cup =

Series of races for all-terrain bicyclists

- Thirty-third edition of the UCI Mountain Bike World Cup

Details
- Dates: March–October 2022
- Races: 9 (XCO); 8 (DHI)

Champions
- Male individual champion: (Switzerland) Nino Schurter (XCO) (France) Amaury Pierron (DH)
- Female individual champion: (Switzerland) Alessandra Keller (XCO) (Switzerland) Camille Balanche (DH)

The 2022 Mercedes-Benz UCI Mountain Bike World Cup is a series of races in Olympic Cross-Country (XCO), Cross-Country Eliminator (XCE), and Downhill (DHI). Each discipline has an Elite Men and an Elite Women category. There are also under-23 categories in the XCO and junior categories in the DHI. The cross-country series has nine rounds and the downhill series eight rounds, some of which are held concurrently.

== Cross-country ==
=== Elite ===
Date	Venue	Podium (Men)	Podium (Women)
10 April	(Brazil) Petrópolis	Nino Schurter (SUI)	Rebecca McConnell (AUS)
10 April	(Brazil) Petrópolis	Maxime Marotte (FRA)	Anne Terpstra (NED)
10 April	(Brazil) Petrópolis	Vlad Dascălu (ROU)	Loana Lecomte (FRA)
8 May	(Germany) Albstadt	Tom Pidcock (GBR)	Rebecca McConnell (AUS)
8 May	(Germany) Albstadt	Nino Schurter (SUI)	Jenny Rissveds (SWE)
8 May	(Germany) Albstadt	Vlad Dascălu (ROU)	Mona Mitterwallner (AUT)
15 May	(Czech Republic) Nové Město na Moravě	Tom Pidcock (GBR)	Rebecca McConnell (AUS)
15 May	(Czech Republic) Nové Město na Moravě	Vlad Dascălu (ROU)	Loana Lecomte (FRA)
15 May	(Czech Republic) Nové Město na Moravě	Nino Schurter (SUI)	Jenny Rissveds (SWE)
12 June	(Austria) Leogang	Mathias Flückiger (SUI)	Loana Lecomte (FRA)
12 June	(Austria) Leogang	Nino Schurter (SUI)	Jenny Rissveds (SWE)
12 June	(Austria) Leogang	Alan Hatherly (RSA)	Laura Stigger (AUT)
10 July	(Switzerland) Lenzerheide	Luca Braidot (ITA)	Loana Lecomte (FRA)
10 July	(Switzerland) Lenzerheide	Alan Hatherly (RSA)	Jenny Rissveds (SWE)
10 July	(Switzerland) Lenzerheide	Mathias Flückiger (SUI)	Alessandra Keller (SUI)
17 July	(Andorra) Vallnord	Luca Braidot (ITA)	Anne Terpstra (NED)
17 July	(Andorra) Vallnord	David Valero (ESP)	Mona Mitterwallner (AUT)
17 July	(Andorra) Vallnord	Nino Schurter (SUI)	Ramona Forchini (SUI)
31 July	(United States) Snowshoe	David Valero (ESP)	Alessandra Keller (SUI)
31 July	(United States) Snowshoe	Titouan Carod (FRA)	Jenny Rissveds (SWE)
31 July	(United States) Snowshoe	Luca Braidot (ITA)	Anne Terpstra (NED)
7 August	(Canada) Mont-Sainte-Anne	Titouan Carod (FRA)	Jolanda Neff (SUI)
7 August	(Canada) Mont-Sainte-Anne	Filippo Colombo (SUI)	Mona Mitterwallner (AUT)
7 August	(Canada) Mont-Sainte-Anne	David Valero (ESP)	Haley Batten (USA)
4 September	(Italy) Val di Sole	Titouan Carod (FRA)	Pauline Ferrand-Prévot (FRA)
4 September	(Italy) Val di Sole	Nino Schurter (SUI)	Loana Lecomte (FRA)
4 September	(Italy) Val di Sole	Jordan Sarrou (FRA)	Jolanda Neff (SUI)

=== Under 23 ===
Date	Venue	Podium (Men)	Podium (Women)
9 April	(Brazil) Petrópolis	Martín Vidaurre (CHI)	Line Burquier (FRA)
9 April	(Brazil) Petrópolis	Janis Baumann (SUI)	Sara Cortinovis (ITA)
9 April	(Brazil) Petrópolis	Oleksandr Hudyma (UKR)	Giada Specia (ITA)
7 May	(Germany) Albstadt	Martín Vidaurre (CHI)	Line Burquier (FRA)
7 May	(Germany) Albstadt	Gustavo Xavier (BRA)	Puck Pieterse (NED)
7 May	(Germany) Albstadt	Dario Lillo (SUI)	Sofie Pedersen (DEN)
14 May	(Czech Republic) Nové Město na Moravě	Martín Vidaurre (CHI)	Line Burquier (FRA)
14 May	(Czech Republic) Nové Město na Moravě	Simone Avondetto (ITA)	Puck Pieterse (NED)
14 May	(Czech Republic) Nové Město na Moravě	Dario Lillo (SUI)	Giada Specia (ITA)
12 June	(Austria) Leogang	Martín Vidaurre (CHI)	Puck Pieterse (NED)
12 June	(Austria) Leogang	Simone Avondetto (ITA)	Line Burquier (FRA)
12 June	(Austria) Leogang	Filippo Fontana (ITA)	Olivia Onesti (FRA)
10 July	(Switzerland) Lenzerheide	Martín Vidaurre (CHI)	Sofie Pedersen (DEN)
10 July	(Switzerland) Lenzerheide	Carter Woods (CAN)	Line Burquier (FRA)
10 July	(Switzerland) Lenzerheide	Charlie Aldridge (GBR)	Puck Pieterse (NED)
17 July	(Andorra) Vallnord	Carter Woods (CAN)	Line Burquier (FRA)
17 July	(Andorra) Vallnord	Luca Martin (FRA)	Ronja Blöchlinger (SUI)
17 July	(Andorra) Vallnord	Riley Amos (USA)	Puck Pieterse (NED)
31 July	(United States) Snowshoe	Martín Vidaurre (CHI)	Noëlle Buri (SUI)
31 July	(United States) Snowshoe	Bjorn Riley (USA)	Luisa Daubermann (GER)
31 July	(United States) Snowshoe	Mathis Azzaro (FRA)	Madigan Munro (USA)
7 August	(Canada) Mont-Sainte-Anne	Martín Vidaurre (CHI)	Noëlle Buri (SUI)
7 August	(Canada) Mont-Sainte-Anne	David Campos (ESP)	Madigan Munro (USA)
7 August	(Canada) Mont-Sainte-Anne	Carter Woods (CAN)	Sara Cortinovis (ITA)
4 September	(Italy) Val di Sole	Martín Vidaurre (CHI)	Line Burquier (FRA)
4 September	(Italy) Val di Sole	David Campos (ESP)	Ronja Blöchlinger (SUI)
4 September	(Italy) Val di Sole	Gustavo Xavier (BRA)	Noémie Garnier (FRA)

== Cross-country short track ==
=== Elite ===
Date	Venue	Podium (Men)	Podium (Women)
8 April	(Brazil) Petrópolis	Alan Hatherly (RSA)	Pauline Ferrand-Prévot (FRA)
8 April	(Brazil) Petrópolis	Thomas Litscher (SUI)	Laura Stigger (AUT)
8 April	(Brazil) Petrópolis	Maxime Marotte (FRA)	Evie Richards (GBR)
6 May	(Germany) Albstadt	Sam Gaze (NZL)	Rebecca McConnell (AUS)
6 May	(Germany) Albstadt	Jordan Sarrou (FRA)	Pauline Ferrand-Prévot (FRA)
6 May	(Germany) Albstadt	Nino Schurter (SUI)	Jenny Rissveds (SWE)
13 May	(Czech Republic) Nové Město na Moravě	Luca Schwarzbauer (GER)	Jolanda Neff (SUI)
13 May	(Czech Republic) Nové Město na Moravě	Tom Pidcock (GBR)	Rebecca McConnell (AUS)
13 May	(Czech Republic) Nové Město na Moravě	Filippo Colombo (SUI)	Jenny Rissveds (SWE)
10 June	(Austria) Leogang	Mathias Flückiger (SUI)	Loana Lecomte (FRA)
10 June	(Austria) Leogang	Vlad Dascălu (ROU)	Anne Terpstra (NED)
10 June	(Austria) Leogang	Vital Albin (SUI)	Caroline Bohé (DEN)
8 July	(Switzerland) Lenzerheide	Filippo Colombo (SUI)	Jenny Rissveds (SWE)
8 July	(Switzerland) Lenzerheide	Mathias Flückiger (SUI)	Alessandra Keller (SUI)
8 July	(Switzerland) Lenzerheide	Alan Hatherly (RSA)	Jolanda Neff (SUI)
17 July	(Andorra) Vallnord	Mathias Flückiger (SUI)	Alessandra Keller (SUI)
17 July	(Andorra) Vallnord	Alan Hatherly (RSA)	Anne Terpstra (NED)
17 July	(Andorra) Vallnord	Vlad Dascălu (ROU)	Rebecca McConnell (AUS)
29 July	(United States) Snowshoe	Christopher Blevins (USA)	Gwendalyn Gibson (USA)
29 July	(United States) Snowshoe	Vlad Dascălu (ROU)	Anne Terpstra (NED)
29 July	(United States) Snowshoe	Luca Braidot (ITA)	Alessandra Keller (SUI)
7 August	(Canada) Mont-Sainte-Anne	Filippo Colombo (SUI)	Jolanda Neff (SUI)
7 August	(Canada) Mont-Sainte-Anne	Gerardo Ulloa (MEX)	Gwendalyn Gibson (USA)
7 August	(Canada) Mont-Sainte-Anne	Sebastian Fini Carstensen (DEN)	Alessandra Keller (SUI)
4 September	(Italy) Val di Sole	Titouan Carod (FRA)	Pauline Ferrand-Prévot (FRA)
4 September	(Italy) Val di Sole	Alan Hatherly (RSA)	Loana Lecomte (FRA)
4 September	(Italy) Val di Sole	Luca Braidot (ITA)	Alessandra Keller (SUI)

== Downhill ==
=== Elite ===
Date	Venue	Podium (Men)	Podium (Women)
27 March	(France) Lourdes	Amaury Pierron (FRA)	Camille Balanche (SUI)
27 March	(France) Lourdes	Finn Iles (CAN)	Myriam Nicole (FRA)
27 March	(France) Lourdes	Loïc Bruni (FRA)	Tahnée Seagrave (GBR)
22 May	(United Kingdom) Fort William	Amaury Pierron (FRA)	Nina Hoffmann (GER)
22 May	(United Kingdom) Fort William	Thibaut Dapréla (FRA)	Camille Balanche (SUI)
22 May	(United Kingdom) Fort William	Laurie Greenland (GBR)	Myriam Nicole (FRA)
11 June	(Austria) Leogang	Matt Walker (GBR)	Camille Balanche (SUI)
11 June	(Austria) Leogang	Danny Hart (GBR)	Myriam Nicole (FRA)
11 June	(Austria) Leogang	Ángel Suárez (ESP)	Eleonora Farina (ITA)
9 July	(Switzerland) Lenzerheide	Amaury Pierron (FRA)	Myriam Nicole (FRA)
9 July	(Switzerland) Lenzerheide	Finn Iles (CAN)	Camille Balanche (SUI)
9 July	(Switzerland) Lenzerheide	Greg Minnaar (RSA)	Eleonora Farina (ITA)
16 July	(Andorra) Vallnord	Loris Vergier (FRA)	Valentina Höll (AUT)
16 July	(Andorra) Vallnord	Loïc Bruni (FRA)	Nina Hoffmann (GER)
16 July	(Andorra) Vallnord	Finn Iles (CAN)	Camille Balanche (SUI)
30 July	(United States) Snowshoe	Amaury Pierron (FRA)	Camille Balanche (SUI)
30 July	(United States) Snowshoe	Bernard Kerr (GBR)	Myriam Nicole (FRA)
30 July	(United States) Snowshoe	Andreas Kolb (AUT)	Nina Hoffmann (GER)
6 August	(Canada) Mont-Sainte-Anne	Finn Iles (CAN)	Valentina Höll (AUT)
6 August	(Canada) Mont-Sainte-Anne	Laurie Greenland (GBR)	Nina Hoffmann (GER)
6 August	(Canada) Mont-Sainte-Anne	Troy Brosnan (AUS)	Eleonora Farina (ITA)
3 September	(Italy) Val di Sole	Loris Vergier (FRA)	Myriam Nicole (FRA)
3 September	(Italy) Val di Sole	Andreas Kolb (AUT)	Nina Hoffmann (GER)
3 September	(Italy) Val di Sole	Dakotah Norton (USA)	Valentina Höll (AUT)

=== Junior ===
Date	Venue	Podium (Men)	Podium (Women)
27 March	(France) Lourdes	Jackson Goldstone (CAN)	Gracey Hemstreet (CAN)
27 March	(France) Lourdes	Remy Meier-Smith (AUS)	Phoebe Gale (GBR)
27 March	(France) Lourdes	Jordan Williams (GBR)	Izabela Yankova (BUL)
22 May	(United Kingdom) Fort William	Jordan Williams (GBR)	Gracey Hemstreet (CAN)
22 May	(United Kingdom) Fort William	Jackson Goldstone (CAN)	Phoebe Gale (GBR)
22 May	(United Kingdom) Fort William	Remy Meier-Smith (AUS)	Aimi Kenyon (GBR)
11 June	(Austria) Leogang	Jordan Williams (GBR)	Phoebe Gale (GBR)
11 June	(Austria) Leogang	Jackson Goldstone (CAN)	Jenna Hastings (NZL)
11 June	(Austria) Leogang	Lachlan Stevens-McNab (NZL)	Gracey Hemstreet (CAN)
10 July	(Switzerland) Lenzerheide	Jackson Goldstone (CAN)	Gracey Hemstreet (CAN)
10 July	(Switzerland) Lenzerheide	Lachlan Stevens-McNab (NZL)	Phoebe Gale (GBR)
10 July	(Switzerland) Lenzerheide	Jordan Williams (GBR)	Jenna Hastings (NZL)
16 July	(Andorra) Vallnord	Jackson Goldstone (CAN)	Phoebe Gale (GBR)
16 July	(Andorra) Vallnord	Jordan Williams (GBR)	Gracey Hemstreet (CAN)
16 July	(Andorra) Vallnord	Tegan Cruz (CAN)	Jenna Hastings (NZL)
30 July	(United States) Snowshoe	Jackson Goldstone (CAN)	Gracey Hemstreet (CAN)
30 July	(United States) Snowshoe	Tegan Cruz (CAN)	Aimi Kenyon (GBR)
30 July	(United States) Snowshoe	Sebastián Holguín (COL)	Izabela Yankova (BUL)
6 August	(Canada) Mont-Sainte-Anne	Jackson Goldstone (CAN)	Phoebe Gale (GBR)
6 August	(Canada) Mont-Sainte-Anne	Jordan Williams (GBR)	Izabela Yankova (BUL)
6 August	(Canada) Mont-Sainte-Anne	Bodhi Kuhn (CAN)	Gracey Hemstreet (CAN)
3 September	(Italy) Val di Sole	Jordan Williams (GBR)	Gracey Hemstreet (CAN)
3 September	(Italy) Val di Sole	Ryan Pinkerton (USA)	Izabela Yankova (BUL)
3 September	(Italy) Val di Sole	Remy Meier-Smith (AUS)	Jenna Hastings (NZL)

== Cross-country eliminator ==
Date	Venue	Podium (Men)	Podium (Women)
23 April	(United Arab Emirates) Abu Dhabi	Titouan Perrin-Ganier (FRA)	Marcela Lima (BRA)
23 April	(United Arab Emirates) Abu Dhabi	Daniel Noyola (MEX)	Didi de Vries (NED)
23 April	(United Arab Emirates) Abu Dhabi	Killian Demangeon (FRA)	Marion Fromberger (GER)
5 June	(Belgium) Leuven	Simon Gegenheimer (GER)	Gaia Tormena (ITA)
5 June	(Belgium) Leuven	Lukas Malezsewski (BEL)	Ella Holmegård (SWE)
5 June	(Belgium) Leuven	Zinni Van Looy (BEL)	Didi de Vries (NED)
17 June	(Sweden) Falun	Simon Gegenheimer (GER)	Gaia Tormena (ITA)
17 June	(Sweden) Falun	Lukas Malezsewski (BEL)	Jenny Rissveds (SWE)
17 June	(Sweden) Falun	Casper Casserstedt (SWE)	Marion Fromberger (GER)
23 July	(Germany) Aalen	Simon Gegenheimer (GER)	Gaia Tormena (ITA)
23 July	(Germany) Aalen	Titouan Perrin-Ganier (FRA)	Lia Schrievers (GER)
23 July	(Germany) Aalen	Quentin Schrotzenberger (FRA)	Coline Clauzure (FRA)
14 August	(Belgium) Oudenaarde	Simon Gegenheimer (GER)	Gaia Tormena (ITA)
14 August	(Belgium) Oudenaarde	Titouan Perrin-Ganier (FRA)	Marion Fromberger (GER)
14 August	(Belgium) Oudenaarde	Theo Hauser (AUT)	Ella Holmegård (SWE)
21 August	(Turkey) Adapazarı–Sakarya	Titouan Perrin-Ganier (FRA)	Gaia Tormena (ITA)
21 August	(Turkey) Adapazarı–Sakarya	Edvin Lindh (SWE)	Marion Fromberger (GER)
21 August	(Turkey) Adapazarı–Sakarya	Theo Hauser (AUT)	Marcela Lima (BRA)
28 August	(Indonesia) Palangkaraya	Quentin Schrotzenberger (FRA)	Marion Fromberger (GER)
28 August	(Indonesia) Palangkaraya	Simon Gegenheimer (GER)	Warinthorn Phetpraphan (THA)
28 August	(Indonesia) Palangkaraya	Methasit Boonsane (THA)	Ayu Triya Andriana (INA)
4 September	(India) Leh	Felix Klausmann (GER)	Marion Fromberger (GER)
4 September	(India) Leh	Erick Fierro (ECU)	Mariske Strauss (RSA)
4 September	(India) Leh	Daniel Noyola (MEX)	Marcela Lima (BRA)
10 September	(France) Paris	Felix Klausmann (GER)	Gaia Tormena (ITA)
10 September	(France) Paris	Titouan Perrin-Ganier (FRA)	Coline Clauzure (FRA)
10 September	(France) Paris	Hugo Boulanger (FRA)	Noémie Garnier (FRA)
17 September	(Germany) Winterberg	Simon Gegenheimer (GER)	Coline Clauzure (FRA)
17 September	(Germany) Winterberg	Titouan Perrin-Ganier (FRA)	Flavie Guille (FRA)
17 September	(Germany) Winterberg	Felix Klausmann (GER)	Margaux Borrelly (FRA)

== E-MTB cross-country ==
Date	Venue	Podium (Men)	Podium (Women)
23 April	Monaco–Peille	Jérôme Gilloux (FRA)	Justine Tonso (FRA)
23 April	Monaco–Peille	Hugo Pigeon (FRA)	Sofia Wiedenroth (GER)
23 April	Monaco–Peille	Emeric Ienzer (SUI)	Nathalie Schneitter (SUI)
24 April	Monaco–Peille	Jérôme Gilloux (FRA)	Justine Tonso (FRA)
24 April	Monaco–Peille	Hugo Pigeon (FRA)	Nathalie Schneitter (SUI)
24 April	Monaco–Peille	Joris Ryf (SUI)	Nicole Göldi (SUI)
28 May	(Italy) Monghidoro–Bologna	Jérôme Gilloux (FRA)	Nicole Göldi (SUI)
28 May	(Italy) Monghidoro–Bologna	Joris Ryf (SUI)	Sofia Wiedenroth (GER)
28 May	(Italy) Monghidoro–Bologna	Martino Fruet (ITA)	Anna Oberparleiter (ITA)
29 May	(Italy) Monghidoro–Bologna	Jérôme Gilloux (FRA)	Justine Tonso (FRA)
29 May	(Italy) Monghidoro–Bologna	Loïc Noël (SUI)	Nathalie Schneitter (SUI)
29 May	(Italy) Monghidoro–Bologna	Théo Charmes (FRA)	Sofia Wiedenroth (GER)
23 July	(France) Charade–Clermont-Ferrand	Joris Ryf (SUI)	Nicole Göldi (SUI)
23 July	(France) Charade–Clermont-Ferrand	Hugo Pigeon (FRA)	Justine Tonso (FRA)
23 July	(France) Charade–Clermont-Ferrand	Fabio Spena (SUI)	Laura Charles (FRA)
24 July	(France) Charade–Clermont-Ferrand	Jérôme Gilloux (FRA)	Nicole Göldi (SUI)
24 July	(France) Charade–Clermont-Ferrand	Joris Ryf (SUI)	Nathalie Schneitter (SUI)
24 July	(France) Charade–Clermont-Ferrand	Fabio Spena (SUI)	Justine Tonso (FRA)
3 September	(Belgium) Spa-Francorchamps	Jérôme Gilloux (FRA)	Nicole Göldi (SUI)
3 September	(Belgium) Spa-Francorchamps	Joris Ryf (SUI)	Sofia Wiedenroth (GER)
3 September	(Belgium) Spa-Francorchamps	Ismael Esteban (ESP)	Justine Tonso (FRA)
4 September	(Belgium) Spa-Francorchamps	Jérôme Gilloux (FRA)	Nicole Göldi (SUI)
4 September	(Belgium) Spa-Francorchamps	Joris Ryf (SUI)	Sofia Wiedenroth (GER)
4 September	(Belgium) Spa-Francorchamps	Kjell van den Boogert (NED)	Justine Tonso (FRA)
23 September	(Spain) Costa Brava–Girona	Jérôme Gilloux (FRA)	Nicole Göldi (SUI)
23 September	(Spain) Costa Brava–Girona	Alberto Mingorance (ESP)	Sofia Wiedenroth (GER)
23 September	(Spain) Costa Brava–Girona	Ismael Esteban (ESP)	Sandra Santanyes (ESP)
24 September	(Spain) Costa Brava–Girona	Joris Ryf (SUI)	Nicole Göldi (SUI)
24 September	(Spain) Costa Brava–Girona	Jérôme Gilloux (FRA)	Sofia Wiedenroth (GER)
24 September	(Spain) Costa Brava–Girona	Ismael Esteban (ESP)	Sandra Santanyes (ESP)
15 October	(Spain) Barcelona	Joris Ryf (SUI)	Sofia Wiedenroth (GER)
15 October	(Spain) Barcelona	Ismael Esteban (ESP)	Kathrin Stirnemann (SUI)
15 October	(Spain) Barcelona	Fabio Spena (SUI)	Justine Tonso (FRA)

== World Cup standings ==
bold denotes race winners.

=== Cross-country ===
==== Men's ====
**Top 5 men's elite standings**
Rank	Rider	BRA (Brazil)	GER (Germany)	CZE (Czech Republic)	AUT (Austria)	SUI (Switzerland)	AND (Andorra)	USA (United States)	CAN (Canada)	ITA (Italy)	Total Points
1	(Switzerland) **Nino Schurter**	**288**	250	194	232	190	188	DNS	141	240	**1723**
2	(France) Titouan Carod	111	187	149	105	65	149	238	**286**	**330**	**1620**
3	(Italy) Luca Braidot	152	11	75	137	**288**	**287**	210	183	190	**1533**
4	(Spain) David Valero	56	168	102	164	163	230	**283**	192	153	**1511**
5	(South Africa) Alan Hatherly	180	154	172	186	250	121	147	110	155	**1475**

**Top 5 men's under 23 standings**
Rank	Rider	BRA (Brazil)	GER (Germany)	CZE (Czech Republic)	AUT (Austria)	SUI (Switzerland)	AND (Andorra)	USA (United States)	CAN (Canada)	ITA (Italy)	Total Points
1	(Chile) **Martín Vidaurre**	**125**	**125**	**125**	**125**	**125**	55	**125**	**125**	**125**	**1055**
2	(Canada) Carter Woods	41	60	44	65	100	**125**	65	80	60	**640**
3	(Spain) David Campos	43	23	43	60	52	52	70	100	100	**543**
4	(Italy) Simone Avondetto	35	52	100	200	70	40	DNS	DNS	70	**467**
5	(France) Mathis Guay	25	43	46	51	75	65	51	39	31	**426**

==== Women's ====
**Top 5 women's elite standings**
Rank	Rider	BRA (Brazil)	GER (Germany)	CZE (Czech Republic)	AUT (Austria)	SUI (Switzerland)	AND (Andorra)	USA (United States)	CAN (Canada)	ITA (Italy)	Total Points
1	(Switzerland) **Alessandra Keller**	145	180	147	135	225	190	**290**	190	180	**1682**
2	(Australia) Rebecca McConnell	**290**	**330**	**315**	158	110	114	105	104	100	**1626**
3	(Netherlands) Anne Terpstra	227	146	135	205	177	315	225	160	28	**1618**
4	(France) Loana Lecomte	198	150	238	**330**	**288**	DNS	DNS	DNS	265	**1469**
5	(Austria) Mona Mitterwallner	177	180	151	106	111	230	186	231	89	**1461**

**Top 5 women's under 23 standings**
Rank	Rider	BRA (Brazil)	GER (Germany)	CZE (Czech Republic)	AUT (Austria)	SUI (Switzerland)	AND (Andorra)	USA (United States)	CAN (Canada)	ITA (Italy)	Total Points
1	(France) **Line Burquier**	**125**	**125**	**125**	100	100	**125**	DNS	DNS	**125**	**825**
2	(Switzerland) Noëlle Buri	DNS	65	70	60	75	75	**125**	**125**	70	**665**
3	(Italy) Sara Cortinovis	100	55	55	49	55	55	52	80	65	**566**
4	(Italy) Giada Specia	80	70	80	55	65	70	DNS	DNS	75	**495**
5	(Netherlands) Puck Pieterse	DNS	100	100	**125**	80	80	DNS	DNS	0	**485**

=== Cross-country short track ===
**Top 5 men's elite standings**
Rank	Rider	BRA (Brazil)	GER (Germany)	CZE (Czech Republic)	AUT (Austria)	SUI (Switzerland)	AND (Andorra)	USA (United States)	CAN (Canada)	ITA (Italy)	Total Points
1	(South Africa) **Alan Hatherly**	**250**	100	90	72	160	200	130	140	200	**1342**
2	(Switzerland) Filippo Colombo	80	120	160	0	**250**	110	110	**250**	76	**1156**
3	(France) Titouan Carod	72	130	78	85	130	78	140	120	**250**	**1083**
4	(Switzerland) Mathias Flückiger	130	90	68	**250**	200	**250**	DNS	DNS	DNS	**988**
5	(Germany) Luca Schwarzbauer	95	150	**250**	46	120	85	74	100	50	**970**

**Top 5 women's elite standings**
Rank	Rider	BRA (Brazil)	GER (Germany)	CZE (Czech Republic)	AUT (Austria)	SUI (Switzerland)	AND (Andorra)	USA (United States)	CAN (Canada)	ITA (Italy)	Total Points
1	(Switzerland) **Alessandra Keller**	110	150	130	150	200	**250**	150	160	160	**1460**
2	(Australia) Rebecca McConnell	150	**250**	200	140	90	160	70	120	90	**1270**
3	(Switzerland) Jolanda Neff	DNS	140	**250**	85	160	74	140	**250**	150	**1249**
4	(Netherlands) Anne Terpstra	74	120	110	200	130	200	200	150	30	**1214**
5	(Sweden) Jenny Rissveds	DNS	160	160	110	**250**	110	160	0	78	**1028**

=== Downhill ===
==== Men's ====
**Top 5 men's elite standings**
Rank	Rider	FRA (France)	GBR (United Kingdom)	AUT (Austria)	SUI (Switzerland)	AND (Andorra)	USA (United States)	CAN (Canada)	ITA (Italy)	Total Points
1	(France) **Amaury Pierron**	**230**	**225**	125	**250**	100	**250**	65	8	**1253**
2	(France) Loris Vergier	85	115	90	115	**250**	103	DNS	**250**	**1008**
3	(Canada) Finn Iles	200	DNS	135	166	165	80	**250**	DNS	**996**
4	(Austria) Andreas Kolb	39	DNS	122	145	125	160	35	200	**826**
5	(United Kingdom) Bernard Kerr	41	67	32	90	71	190	132	132	**755**

**Top 5 men's junior standings**
Rank	Rider	FRA (France)	GBR (United Kingdom)	AUT (Austria)	SUI (Switzerland)	AND (Andorra)	USA (United States)	CAN (Canada)	ITA (Italy)	Total Points
1	(Canada) **Jackson Goldstone**	**60**	50	50	**60**	**60**	**60**	**60**	40	**440**
2	(United Kingdom) Jordan Williams	45	**60**	**60**	45	50	16	50	**60**	**386**
3	(New Zealand) Lachlan Stevens-McNab	40	30	45	50	26	40	40	DNS	**271**
4	(Canada) Tegan Cruz	22	28	20	16	45	50	26	20	**227**
5	(Australia) Remy Meier-Smith	50	45	35	28	0	6	14	45	**223**

==== Women's ====
**Top 5 women's elite standings**
Rank	Rider	FRA (France)	GBR (United Kingdom)	AUT (Austria)	SUI (Switzerland)	AND (Andorra)	USA (United States)	CAN (Canada)	ITA (Italy)	Total Points
1	(Switzerland) **Camille Balanche**	**225**	210	**250**	210	190	**250**	DNS	130	**1465**
2	(France) Myriam Nicole	200	170	185	**240**	110	200	50	**250**	**1405**
3	(Austria) Valentina Höll	175	150	135	126	**225**	155	**250**	170	**1386**
4	(Germany) Nina Hoffmann	80	**212**	76	15	200	160	190	200	**1133**
5	(Italy) Eleonora Farina	90	145	160	165	115	120	156	70	**1021**

**Top 5 women's junior standings**
Rank	Rider	FRA (France)	GBR (United Kingdom)	AUT (Austria)	SUI (Switzerland)	AND (Andorra)	USA (United States)	CAN (Canada)	ITA (Italy)	Total Points
1	(Canada) **Gracey Hemstreet**	**60**	**60**	45	**60**	50	**60**	45	**60**	**440**
2	(United Kingdom) Phoebe Gale	50	50	**60**	50	**60**	25	**60**	0	**355**
3	(Bulgaria) Izabela Yankova	45	0	30	40	35	45	50	50	**295**
4	(New Zealand) Jenna Hastings	30	40	50	45	45	40	DNS	45	**295**
5	(United Kingdom) Aimi Kenyon	10	45	25	35	10	50	35	30	**240**

=== Cross-country eliminator ===
Only the best 9 results are taken into account for the final ranking

**Top 5 men's elite standings**
Rank	Rider	UAE (United Arab Emirates)	BEL (Belgium)	SWE (Sweden)	GER (Germany)	BEL (Belgium)	TUR (Turkey)	INA (Indonesia)	IND (India)	FRA (France)	GER (Germany)	Total Points
1	(Germany) **Simon Gegenheimer**	29	**73**	**60**	**60**	**80**	~~0~~	50	0	28	**75**	**455**
2	(France) Titouan Perrin-Ganier	**90**	29	25	53	49	**75**	~~0~~	0	53	60	**434**
3	(France) Quentin Schrotzenberger	32	~~0~~	4	50	44	55	73	0	55	38	**351**
4	(Germany) Felix Klausmann	31	22	~~0~~	20	19	26	10	**80**	**75**	38	**321**
5	(Mexico) Daniel Noyola	55	~~0~~	0	4	20	21	0	43	0	0	**143**

**Top 5 women's elite standings**
Rank	Rider	UAE (United Arab Emirates)	BEL (Belgium)	SWE (Sweden)	GER (Germany)	BEL (Belgium)	TUR (Turkey)	INA (Indonesia)	IND (India)	FRA (France)	GER (Germany)	Total Points
1	(Italy) **Gaia Tormena**	55	**90**	**80**	**90**	**90**	**90**	~~0~~	0	**90**	38	**623**
2	(Germany) Marion Fromberger	45	37	45	40	60	60	80	**90**	~~0~~	0	**457**
3	(Brazil) Marcela Lima	**80**	17	30	34	29	45	~~0~~	80	17	17	**319**
4	(Netherlands) Didi de Vries	52	41	~~20~~	26	38	30	24	38	34	25	**308**
5	(France) Coline Clauzure	~~0~~	33	0	41	0	0	0	0	55	**90**	**219**

=== E-MTB cross-country ===
Top 5 men's standings
Rank	Rider	MON (Monaco)	MON (Monaco)	ITA (Italy)	ITA (Italy)	FRA (France)	FRA (France)	BEL (Belgium)	BEL (Belgium)	ESP (Spain)	ESP (Spain)	ESP (Spain)	Total Points
1	(France) **Jérôme Gilloux**	**25**	**25**	**25**	**25**	10	**25**	**25**	**25**	**25**	20	DNS	**230**
2	(Switzerland) Joris Ryf	DNS	DNS	16	20	**25**	20	20	20	11	**25**	25	**182**
3	(Spain) Ismael Esteban	DNS	DNS	9	13	DNS	DNS	16	13	16	16	20	**103**
4	(Honduras) Milton Ramos	4	5	7	0	9	9	11	10	9	10	9	**83**
5	(Switzerland) Loïc Noël	13	11	13	20	11	11	DNS	DNS	DNS	DNS	DNS	**79**

Top 5 women's standings
Rank	Rider	MON (Monaco)	MON (Monaco)	ITA (Italy)	ITA (Italy)	FRA (France)	FRA (France)	BEL (Belgium)	BEL (Belgium)	ESP (Spain)	ESP (Spain)	ESP (Spain)	Total Points
1	(Switzerland) **Nicole Göldi**	11	16	**25**	11	**25**	**25**	**25**	**25**	**25**	**25**	DNS	**213**
2	(Germany) Sofia Wiedenroth	20	11	20	16	11	11	20	20	20	20	25	**194**
3	(France) Justine Tonso	**25**	**25**	0	**25**	20	16	16	16	DNS	DNS	16	**159**
4	(Switzerland) Nathalie Schneitter	16	20	13	20	13	20	DNS	DNS	DNS	DNS	DNS	**102**
5	(Spain) Sandra Santanyes	DNS	DNS	DNS	DNS	10	10	DNS	DNS	16	16	13	**65**

== See also ==
- 2022 UCI Mountain Bike World Championships
