= Nino Schurter =

Swiss cyclist (born 1986)

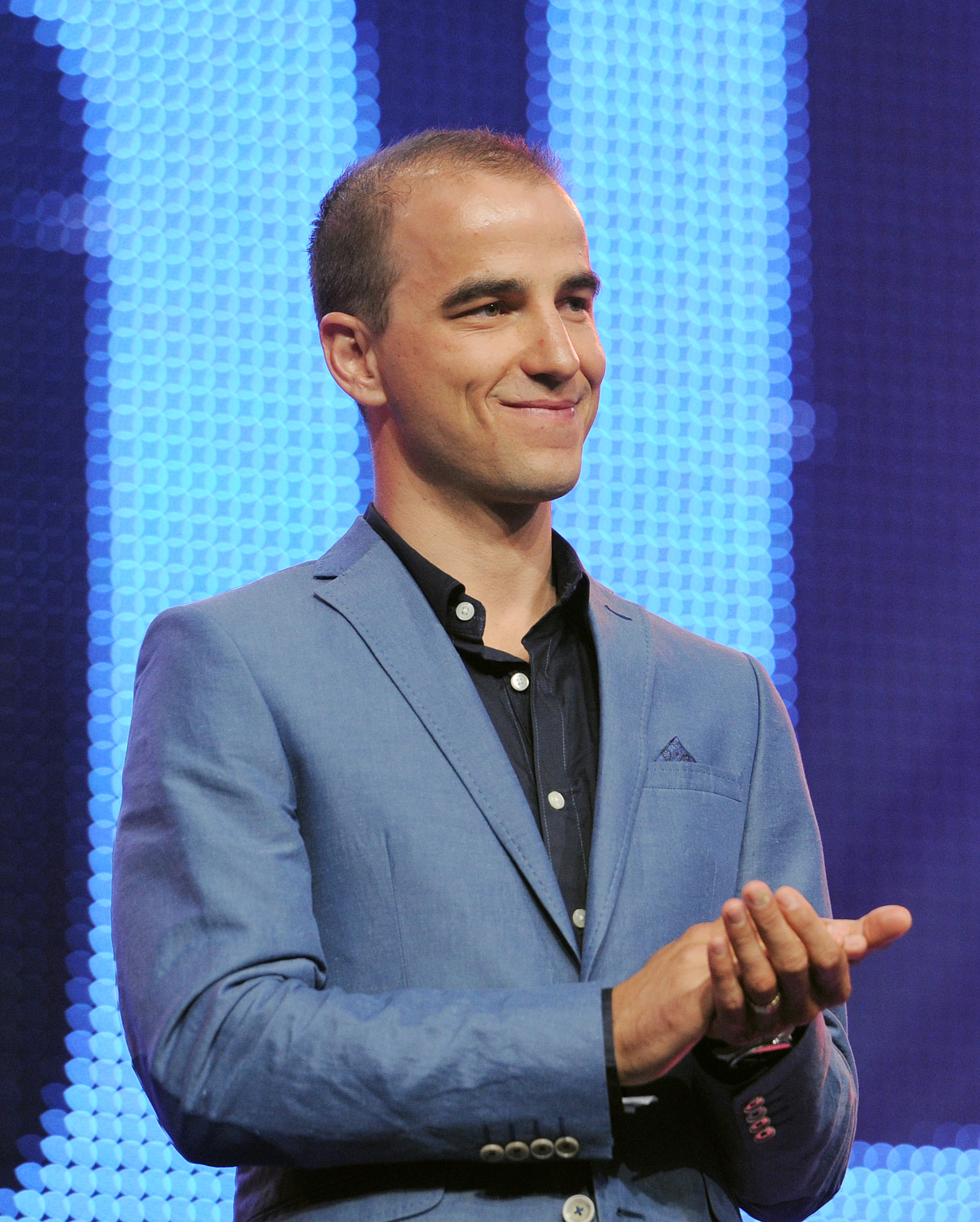
- Schurter in 2014

Personal information
- Full name: Nino Schurter
- Nickname: N/A
- Born: 13 May 1986 (age 40) Tersnaus, Lumnezia, Switzerland
- Height: 1.73 m (5 ft 8 in)
- Weight: 68 kg (150 lb)

Cycling career
- Sport: Cycling
- Current team: Scott–Sram MTB Racing Team
- Discipline: Mountain bike racing
- Role: Mountainbike Rider
- Rider type: Cross-country

Professional teams
- 2006–Present: Swisspower MTB Team
- 2014: Orica–GreenEDGE

Major wins
- Mountain bike Olympic Games XC (2016) World XC Championships (2009, 2012, 2013, 2015–2019, 2021, 2022) European XC Championships (2020) National XC Championships (2012–2017, 2019, 2020) XC World Cup (2010, 2012, 2013, 2015, 2017–2019, 2022, 2023) 36 individual wins (2010–2019, 2022, 2023, 2024) Cape Epic (2017, 2019, 2025)
Medal record
Men's mountain bike racing
Representing Switzerland
Event	1st	2nd	3rd
Olympic Games	1	1	1
World Championships	17	7	1
European Championships	1	4	1
World Cup	9	3	0
European Games	1	0	0
Total	27	15	2
Olympic Games
Gold medal – first place	2016 Rio de Janeiro	Cross-country
Silver medal – second place	2012 London	Cross-country
Bronze medal – third place	2008 Beijing	Cross-country
World Championships
Gold medal – first place	2006 Rotorua	Cross-country team
Gold medal – first place	2007 Fort William	Cross-country team
Gold medal – first place	2009 Canberra	Cross-country
Gold medal – first place	2012 Saalfelden	Cross-country
Gold medal – first place	2013 Pietermaritzburg	Cross-country
Gold medal – first place	2015 Vallnord	Cross-country
Gold medal – first place	2016 Nové Město na Moravě	Cross-country
Gold medal – first place	2017 Cairns	Cross-country
Gold medal – first place	2017 Cairns	Cross-country team
Gold medal – first place	2018 Lenzerheide	Cross-country
Gold medal – first place	2018 Lenzerheide	Team relay
Gold medal – first place	2019 Mont-Sainte-Anne	Cross-country
Gold medal – first place	2019 Mont-Sainte-Anne	Team relay
Gold medal – first place	2021 Val di Sole	Cross-country
Gold medal – first place	2022 Les Gets	Cross-country
Gold medal – first place	2022 Les Gets	Team relay
Gold medal – first place	2023 Glasgow	Team relay
Silver medal – second place	2003 Lugano	Cross-country team
Silver medal – second place	2004 Les Gets	Cross-country team
Silver medal – second place	2008 Val di Sole	Cross-country team
Silver medal – second place	2011 Champery	Cross-country
Silver medal – second place	2011 Champery	Cross-country team
Silver medal – second place	2014 Hafjell	Cross-country
Silver medal – second place	2014 Hafjell	Cross-country team
Bronze medal – third place	2023 Glasgow	Cross-country
European Games
Gold medal – first place	2015 Baku	Cross-country
World Cup
Gold medal – first place	2010 Overall	Cross-country
Gold medal – first place	2012 Overall	Cross-country
Gold medal – first place	2013 Overall	Cross-country
Gold medal – first place	2015 Overall	Cross-country
Gold medal – first place	2017 Overall	Cross-country
Gold medal – first place	2018 Overall	Cross-country
Gold medal – first place	2019 Overall	Cross-country
Gold medal – first place	2022 Overall	Cross-country
Gold medal – first place	2023 Overall	Cross-country
Silver medal – second place	2011 Overall	Cross-country
Silver medal – second place	2014 Overall	Cross-country
Silver medal – second place	2016 Overall	Cross-country

Nino Schurter (born 13 May 1986) is a Swiss cross-country cyclist who races for the Scott–Sram MTB Racing Team.

Schurter won the world championship in men's cross-country in 2009, 2012, 2013, 2015, 2016, 2017, 2018, 2019, 2021 and 2022 and the overall UCI World Cup in 2010, 2012, 2013, 2015, 2017, 2018, 2019, 2022 and 2023 and thus become the first man to hold 9 World Cup overall titles. He won the gold medal in mountain biking at the 2016 Olympics, the silver medal 2012 Olympics and the bronze medal at the 2008 Olympics. He won the Swiss National Championship in cross-country mountain biking in 2012, 2013, 2014, 2015. He joined Orica–GreenEDGE for a number of road races during the 2014 season.

== Career ==
Nino Schurter was born and grew up in Tersnaus, Lumnezia in the Romansch-speaking part of Switzerland. He spent a lot of his free time in nature playing different sports and quickly got fascinated by mountain biking. He took part in the Swiss racing competition Swisspower cup where he won his first victories. In 2003, he became a member of the professional team of Thomas Frischknecht and he turned professional in 2007 when he joined the SCOTT-SRAM MTB Racing Team (former SCOTT-Odlo MTB Racing and even earlier SWISSPOWER).

He currently rides a Scott Spark RC World cup EVO.

=== 2004 ===
In his first junior international competition on 31 July in Wałbrzych, Poland, Nino Schurter finished first at the European Championships.

=== 2012 ===
2012 was one of Schurter's most successful season when he won 11 out of 15 races. He won his first World Cup of the season on 18 March in Pietermaritzburg on a bike with 650B or 27.5-inch wheels. On 13 May, he won his second World Cup on his 26th birthday in Nové Město na Moravě. On 28 July, after his fourth individual win, Schurter won the overall World Cup series title in Val d'Isère.

On 15 September 2011, Schurter qualified for the 2012 Olympics where he won the silver medal after being beaten in a final sprint on the line by Jaroslav Kulhavý. On 8 September 2012, he won his second World Championships title in Saalbach, Austria, where he shared the podium with two of his countrymen Lukas and Matthias Flückiger.

=== 2013 ===
On 2 September 2013, Schurter won his third World Championship title in Pietermaritzburg, South Africa, on one of his favourite cross-country courses.

=== 2014 ===
Schurter joined the Australian road race cycling team Orica–GreenEDGE during the 2014 season. He took part in the Tour de Romandie and the Tour de Suisse.

In the 2014, mountain bike season, he lost his World Cup and World Championships titles. He finished in second place in Hafjell, Norway and ended up his season behind Julien Absalon at the World Cup in Méribel.

=== 2015 ===
In 2015, Schurter fully committed to his mountain bike career as he had the 2016 Olympics in Rio on his agenda for the next two years. He competed in the 2015 European Games for Switzerland, in mountain biking. He won the gold medal in the event.

=== 2016 ===
Schurter won his fifth world championship in men's cross-country at the 2016 UCI Mountain Bike & Trials World Championships at Nové Město na Moravě, Czech Republic. This equaled the record of Julien Absalon, who has also won five titles in the event. At the 2016 Summer Olympic, he won the gold medal, finishing before Jaroslav Kulhavý and Carlos Coloma Nicolás.

=== 2017 Perfect season ===
In March 2017, Schurter won the Absa Cape Epic – the eight-day South African stage race – for the first time. Riding with Scott-Sram teammate Matthias Stirnemann in the two-man team format they won by eight minutes from pre-race favorites Christoph Sauser and Jaroslav Kulhavý (Investec Songo Specialized). Schurter had completed the Cape Epic three times previously. This was his first win. He went on to win all six rounds of the World Cup and accomplished as first male a Perfect season, as well as his sixth world championship.

== Major results ==
2004
UCI World Junior Championships

1st Cross-country
2nd Team relay

1st Cross-country, UEC European Junior Championships
2005
1st Cross-country, National Under-23 Championships
3rd Cross-country, UCI World Under-23 Championships
2006
UCI World Championships

1st Team relay
1st Under-23 Cross-country

1st Cross-country, UEC European Under-23 Championships
2007
UCI World Championships

1st Team relay
2nd Under-23 Cross-country

1st Cross-country, UEC European Under-23 Championships
2nd Cross-country, National Under-23 Championships
UCI XCO World Cup

3rd Champery

8th Overall Grand Prix Guillaume Tell
2008
UCI World Championships

1st Under-23 Cross-country
2nd Team relay

1st Cross-country, UEC European Under-23 Championships
UCI XCO World Cup

2nd Houffalize
2nd Fort William

Swisspower Cup

2nd Winterthur
3rd Buchs

3rd Cross-country, Olympic Games
2009
1st Cross-country, UCI World Championships
5th Overall UCI XCO World Cup

4th Schladming
5th Madrid

2010
1st Overall UCI XCO World Cup

1st Dalby Forest
1st Val di Sole
2nd Offenburg
2nd Windham
3rd Champéry

4th Cross-country, UCI World Championships
2011
UCI World Championships

2nd Cross-country
2nd Team relay

2nd Overall UCI XCO World Cup

1st Pietermaritzburg
2nd Mont-Sainte-Anne
2nd Windham
2nd Nové Město
2nd Val d'Isère

2012
1st Cross-country, UCI World Championships
1st Cross-country, National Championships
1st Overall UCI XCO World Cup

1st Pietermaritzburg
1st Nové Město
1st Mont-Sainte-Anne
1st Val d'Isère
2nd Houffalize

2nd Cross-country, Olympic Games
2013
1st Cross-country, UCI World Championships
1st Cross-country, National Championships
1st Overall UCI XCO World Cup

1st Nové Město
1st Val di Sole
1st Vallnord
2nd Hafjell
3rd Mont-Sainte-Anne

2nd Cross-country, UEC European Championships
2014
1st Cross-country, National Championships
UCI World Championships

2nd Cross-country
2nd Team relay

2nd Overall UCI XCO World Cup

1st Nové Město
1st Mont-Sainte-Anne
1st Windham
1st Méribel
2nd Albstadt

2015
1st Cross-country, UCI World Championships
1st Cross-country, European Games
1st Cross-country, National Championships
1st Overall UCI XCO World Cup

1st Mont-Sainte-Anne
1st Windham
1st Val di Sole
2nd Nové Město
2nd Albstadt
2nd Lenzerheide

2016
1st Cross-country, Olympic Games
1st Cross-country, UCI World Championships
1st Cross-country, National Championships
2nd Overall UCI XCO World Cup

1st Cairns
1st Albstadt
1st Lenzerheide
4th La Bresse

2017
UCI World Championships

1st Cross-country
1st Team relay

1st Cross-country, National Championships
1st Overall Cape Epic (with Matthias Stirnemann)
1st Overall UCI XCO World Cup

1st Nové Město
1st Albstadt
1st Vallnord
1st Lenzerheide
1st Mont-Sainte-Anne
1st Val di Sole

2018
UCI World Championships

1st Cross-country
1st Team relay

1st Overall Outcast Rider, Cape Epic
1st Overall UCI XCO World Cup

1st Nové Město
1st Albstadt
1st Val di Sole
1st La Bresse
2nd Stellenbosch
2nd Vallnord

UCI XCC World Cup

2nd Val di Sole
3rd Nové Město

2019
UCI World Championships

1st Cross-country
1st Team relay

1st Cross-country, National Championships
1st Overall Cape Epic (with Lars Forster)
1st Overall UCI XCO World Cup

1st Vallnord
1st Les Gets
2nd Nové Město
2nd Lenzerheide
2nd Snowshoe
3rd Val di Sole

UCI XCC World Cup

1st Snowshoe
2nd Vallnord
3rd Albstadt
3rd Lenzerheide

Swiss Bike Cup

1st Solothurn
2nd Lugano

1st Tokyo 2020 Test Event
Internazionali d'Italia Series

3rd Monte Titano

2020
1st Cross-country, UEC European Championships
1st Cross-country, National Championships
1st Overall Swiss Epic (with Lars Forster)
Swiss Bike Cup

1st Leukerbad

4th Overall UCI XCO World Cup

3rd Nové Město II
4th Nové Město I

2021
1st Cross-country, UCI World Championships
Internazionali d'Italia Series

2nd Andora
2nd Nalles

UCI XCC World Cup

3rd Albstadt

4th Overall UCI XCO World Cup

2nd Albstadt
2nd Lenzerheide
4th Snowshoe
5th Les Gets

4th Cross-country, Olympic Games
2022
UCI World Championships

1st Cross-country
1st Team relay

1st Overall UCI XCO World Cup

1st Petrópolis
2nd Albstadt
2nd Leogang
2nd Val di Sole
3rd Nové Město
3rd Vallnord
4th Lenzerheide

UCI XCC World Cup

3rd Albstadt

2023
UCI World Championships

1st Team relay
3rd Cross-country

1st Overall UCI XCO World Cup

1st Lenzerheide
1st Val di Sole
2nd Les Gets
2nd Snowshoe
3rd Nové Město

Ökk Bike Revolution

1st Engelberg
3rd Chur
3rd Davos

Internazionali d'Italia Series

1st Capoliveri

UCI XCC World Cup

2nd Vallnord

2024
UCI XCO World Cup

1st Val di Sole
2nd Nové Město
4th Crans-Montana

2nd Overall Cape Epic (with Sebastian Fini Carstensen)
Ökk Bike Revolution

2nd Engelberg

3rd Cross-country, National Championships
2025
1st Overall Cape Epic (with Filippo Colombo)
Ökk Bike Revolution

2nd Huttwil

UCI XCC World Cup

3rd Araxá II

UCI XCO World Cup

5th Araxá I

=== UCI World Cup results ===
Season	1	2	3	4	5	6	7	8	9	10	Rank	Points
2005	SPA; 28	MAD; 35	HOU; 45	WIL; 22	MON —	SAN —	ANG —	FOR; DNF			43	174
2006	CUR; 14	MAD; 14	SPA —	FOR; 9	MON; 18	SCH; 23					9	481
2007	HOU; 6	OFF; DNF	CHA; 3	MON; 5	FEL; 6	MAR; DNF					8	560
2008	HOU; 2	OFF; 4	MAD; DNF	AND; 15	FOR; 2	MON —	BRO —	CAN; 8	SCH; 17		8	808
2009	PIE; 6	OFF; 10	HOU —	MAD; 5	MON; 13	BRO; 6	CHA; 26	SCH; 4			5	779
2010	DAL; 1	HOU; 15	OFF; 2	CHA; 3	ISE; 1	WIN; 2					1	1136
2011	PIE; 1	DAL; 9	OFF; 7	MON; 2	WIN; 2	NOV; 2	ISE; 2				2	1270
2012	PIE; 1	HOU; 2	NOV; 1	LAB —	MON; 1	WIN —	ISE; 1				1	1200
2013	ALB; 18	NOV; 1	VAL; 1	AND; 1	MON; 3	HAF; 2					1	1180
2014	PIE; 6	CAI —	NOV; 1	ALB; 2	MON; 1	WIN; 1	MER; 1				2	1330
2015	NOV; 2	ALB; 2	LEN; 2	MON; 1	WIN; 1	VAL; 1					1	850
2016	CAI; 1	ALB; 1	LAB; 4	LEN; 1	MON —	AND; 13					2	2190
2017	NOV; 1	ALB; 1	AND; 1	LEN; 1	MON; 1	VAL; 1					1	1500
2018	STE; 2	ALB; 1	NOV; 1	VAL; 1	AND; 2	MON; 7	LAB; 1				1	1861
2019	ALB; 6	NOV; 2	AND; 1	LES; 1	VAL; 3	LEN; 2	SNO; 2				1	1995
2020	LEN; NH	VAL; NH	LES; NH	NOV; 4	NOV; 3						4	310
2021	ALB; 2	NOV; 7	LEO; 10	LES; 5	LEN; 2	SNO; 4					4	1182
2022	PET; 1	ALB; 2	NOV; 3	LEO; 2	LEN; 4	AND; 3	SNO; DNF	MON; 6	VAL; 2		1	1723
2023	NOV; 3	LEN; 1	LEO; 21	VAL; 1	AND; 12	LES; 2	SNO; 2	MON; 14			1	1549
2024	MAI; 35	ARA; 6	NOV; 2	VAL; 1	CRA; 4	LES; 8	LAK; 25	MON; 8			4	1164
2025	ARA; 5	ARA; 25	NOV; 18	LEO; 11	VAL; 14	AND; 7	LES; 16	LEN; 24	LAK —	MON —	19	842

Awards and achievements
Preceded by Roger Federer	Swiss Sportsman of the Year; 2018	Succeeded by Christian Stucki
