= Camille Balanche =

Swiss cyclist (born 1990)

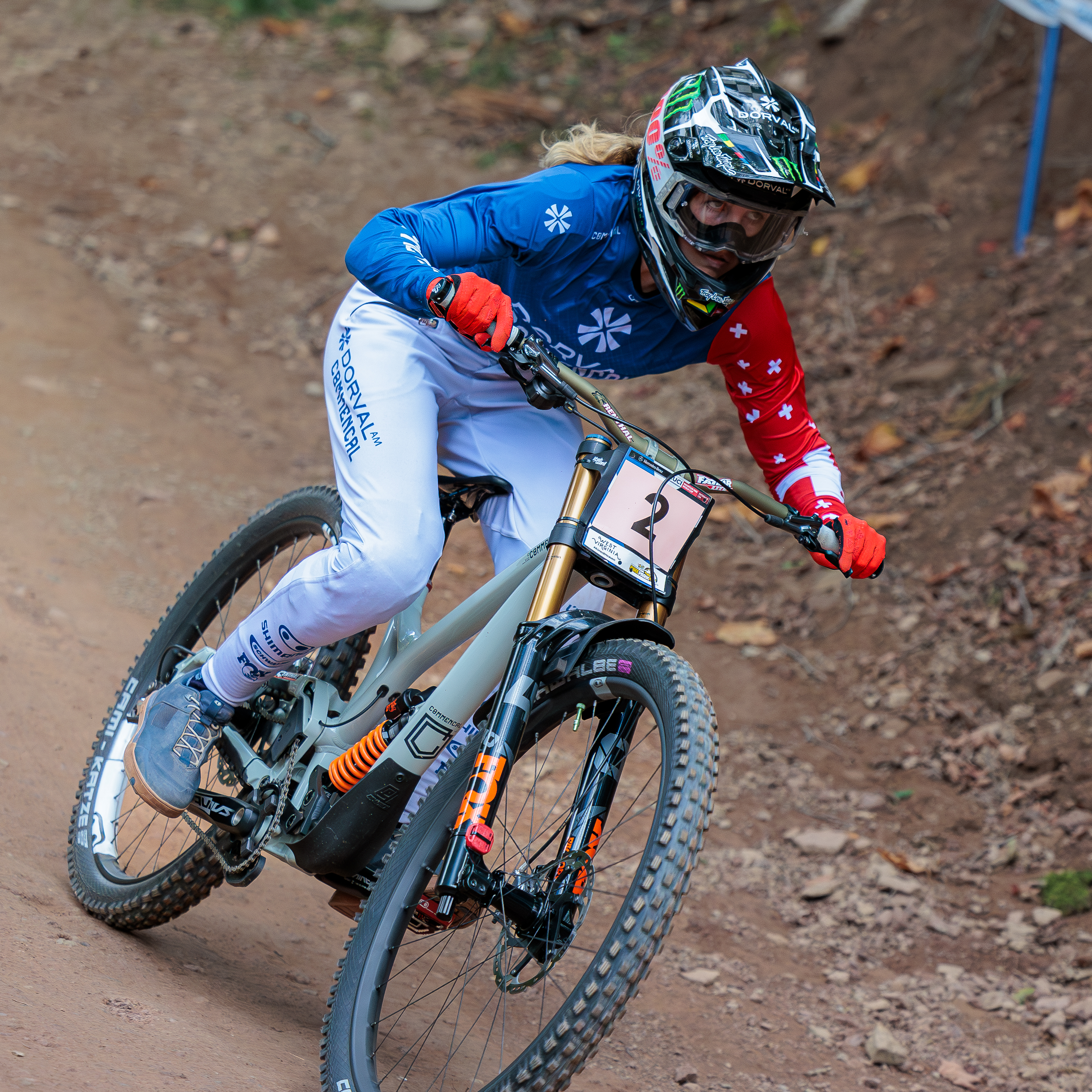
- Balanche at the 2021 UCI Downhill Mountain Bike World Cup in Snowshoe, West Virginia

Personal information
- Born: 1 March 1990 (age 36) Le Locle, Switzerland

Cycling career
- Sport: Cycling
- Discipline: Mountain bike racing
- Rider type: Downhill
Medal record
Representing Switzerland
Women's mountain bike racing
World Championships
Gold medal – first place	2020 Leogang	Downhill
Silver medal – second place	2023 Glasgow	Downhill
Bronze medal – third place	2021 Val di Sole	Downhill

Camille Balanche (born 1 March 1990) is a Swiss cyclist. In 2020, she won the women's downhill race at the UCI Mountain Bike & Trials World Championships held in Leogang, Austria. She is the first Swiss rider to win a Downhill world title.

== Biography ==
Daughter of Gérald Balanche and Nacira Larfi Balanche, Camille Balanche was born in Le Locle and grew up in La Chaux-de-Fonds. At the age of 12, she began her sporting career in ice hockey at the La Chaux-de-Fonds Hockey Club, before joining Montréal once she could no longer play in men's teams. In 2010, she was selected to play for Switzerland in the Olympic Games.

Returning after the games, she started studying in the Federal Sporting School of Macolin and stopped ice hockey. In 2014, beside of her studies, she discovered cycling and began a career in enduro. She won the first Swiss Cup in the discipline, joining the international field.

In 2017, she began a new career in downhill, winning a bronze medal during the 2018 European Championships. She became European downhill champion the following year.

In 2020, she became downhill world champion.

== Personal life ==
Balanche is a lesbian and has been in a relationship since 2017 with Emilie Siegenthaler, a fellow downhill mountain bike racer.

== Palmarès ==
2018
3rd Swiss National Mountain Bike Championships (DH)
2019
1st European Mountain Bike Championships (DH)
UCI Mountain Bike World Cup (DH)

3rd Round 6 (Val di Sole, Italy)

2020
1st UCI Mountain Bike World Championships (DH)
1st Swiss National Mountain Bike Championships (DH)
2021
3rd UCI Mountain Bike World Championships (DH)
1st Swiss National Mountain Bike Championships (DH)
UCI Mountain Bike World Cup (DH)

1st Round 1 (Leogang, Austria)
3rd Round 2 (Les Gets, France)
3rd Round 3 (Maribor, Slovenia)
2nd Round 5 (Snowshoe, United States)
3rd Round 6 (Snowshoe, United States)

2022
1st Overall UCI Mountain Bike World Cup (DH)

1st Round 1 (Lourdes, France)
2nd Round 2 (Fort William, Scotland)
1st Round 3 (Leogang, Austria)
2nd Round 4 (Lenzerheide, Switzerland)
3rd Round 5 (Vallnord, Andorra)
1st Round 6 (Snowshoe, United States)

1st Swiss National Mountain Bike Championships (DH)
2023
UCI Mountain Bike World Cup (DH)

2nd Round 1 (Lenzerheide, Switzerland)
