= Mathias Flückiger =

Swiss cyclist (born 1988)

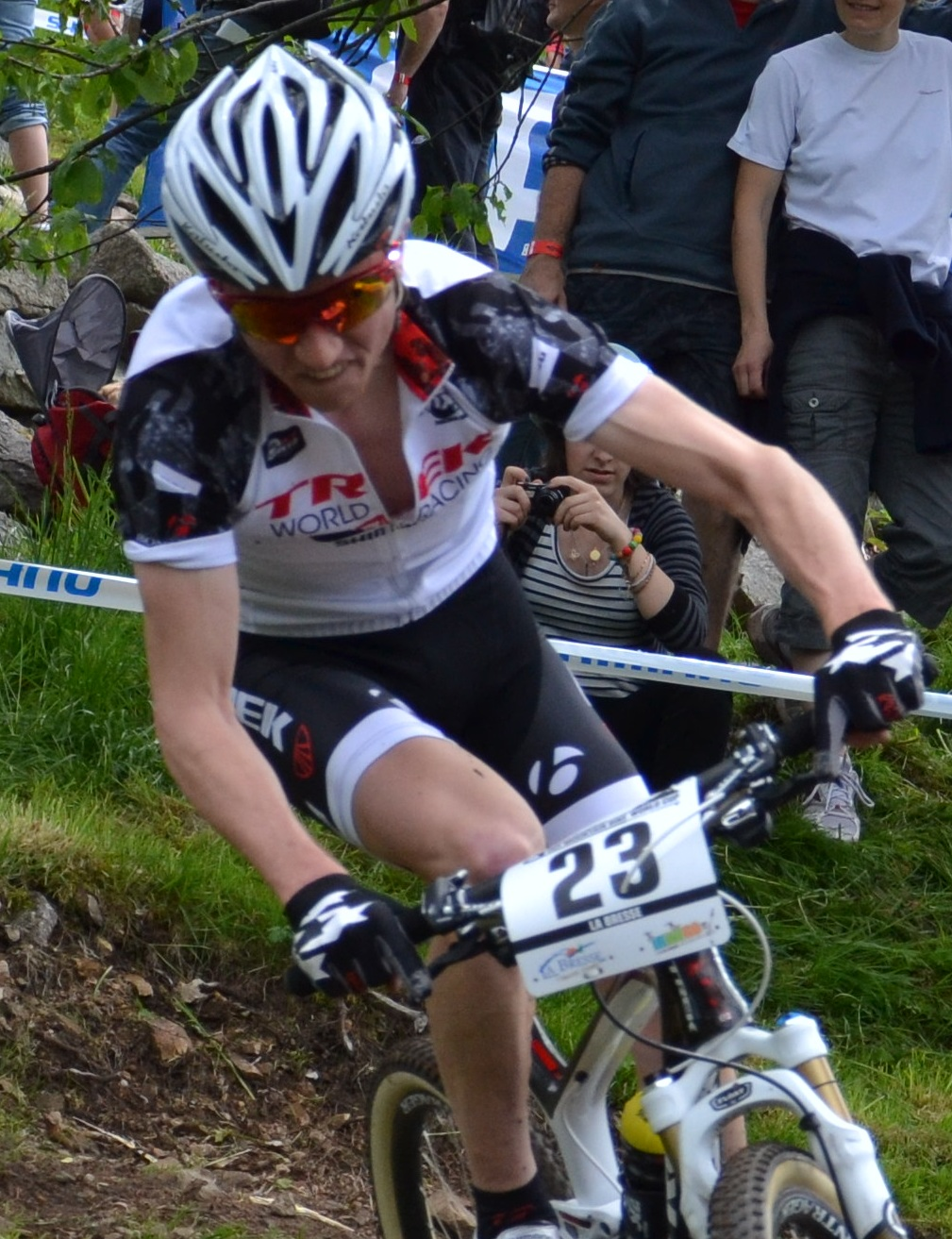
- Flückiger in 2012

Personal information
- Born: 27 September 1988 (age 38) Bern, Switzerland
- Height: 1.73 m (5 ft 8 in)
- Weight: 65 kg (143 lb)

Cycling career
- Sport: Cycling
- Current team: Thömus RN Racing Team
- Discipline: Mountain bike
- Role: Rider

Major wins
- Mountain bike National XC Championships (2018, 2021–2023) XC World Cup (2021) 6 individual wins (2018, 2019, 2021–2023)
Medal record
Representing Switzerland
Men's mountain bike racing
Olympic Games
Silver medal – second place	2020 Tokyo	Cross-country
World Championships
Gold medal – first place	2010 Mont-Sainte-Anne	Under-23 Cross-country
Gold medal – first place	2019 Mont-Sainte-Anne	Team relay
Silver medal – second place	2019 Mont-Sainte-Anne	Cross-country
Silver medal – second place	2020 Leogang	Cross-country
Bronze medal – third place	2012 Saalfelden	Cross-country
European Championships
Gold medal – first place	2010 Haifa	Under-23 Cross-country
Bronze medal – third place	2020 Monteceneri	Cross-country

Mathias Flückiger (born 27 September 1988) is a Swiss mountain bike racer. He rode at the cross-country event at the 2016 Summer Olympics, and 2020 Summer Olympics, where he won a silver medal. His brother Lukas is also a cyclist. In June 2022, he tested positive for zeranol during the Swiss national championships, which he won. He was temporarily suspended on 19 August 2022. He appealed the decision, and in December, his suspension was lifted.

== Major results ==
2008
3rd Cross-country, UEC European Under-23 Championships
2010
1st Cross-country, UCI World Under-23 Championships
1st Cross-country, UEC European Under-23 Championships
2012
3rd Cross-country, UCI World Championships
3rd Cross-country, National Championships
2014
1st Overall Swiss Epic (with Lukas Buchli)
2015
1st Overall Swiss Epic (with Lukas Buchli)
2017
2nd Cross-country, National Championships
2018
1st Cross-country, National Championships
6th Overall UCI XCO World Cup

1st Mont-Sainte-Anne

2019
UCI XCO World Cup

1st Albstadt
3rd Nové Město

2nd Cross-country, UCI World Championships
2nd Cross-country, National Championships
2020
2nd Cross-country, UCI World Championships
Swiss Bike Cup

1st Gstaad
2nd Leukerbad

2021
1st Cross-country, National Championships
1st Overall UCI XCO World Cup

1st Leogang
1st Les Gets
3rd Albstadt
3rd Nové Město

UCI XCC World Cup

1st Leogang
1st Les Gets
2nd Lenzerheide

2nd Cross-country, Olympic Games
2nd Cross-country, UCI World Championships
2022
1st Cross-country, National Championships
UCI XCO World Cup

1st Leogang

UCI XCC World Cup

1st Leogang
1st Vallnord
2nd Lenzerheide

2023
1st Cross-country, National Championships
3rd Overall UCI XCO World Cup

1st Vallnord
2nd Val di Sole
2nd Mont-Sainte-Anne
4th Snowshoe

Ökk Bike Revolution

1st Rivera
2nd Chur

2024
Ökk Bike Revolution

1st Davos

UCI XCO World Cup

2nd Crans-Montana
2nd Les Gets

5th Cross-country, Olympic Games
