= Jenna Hastings =

New Zealand cyclist

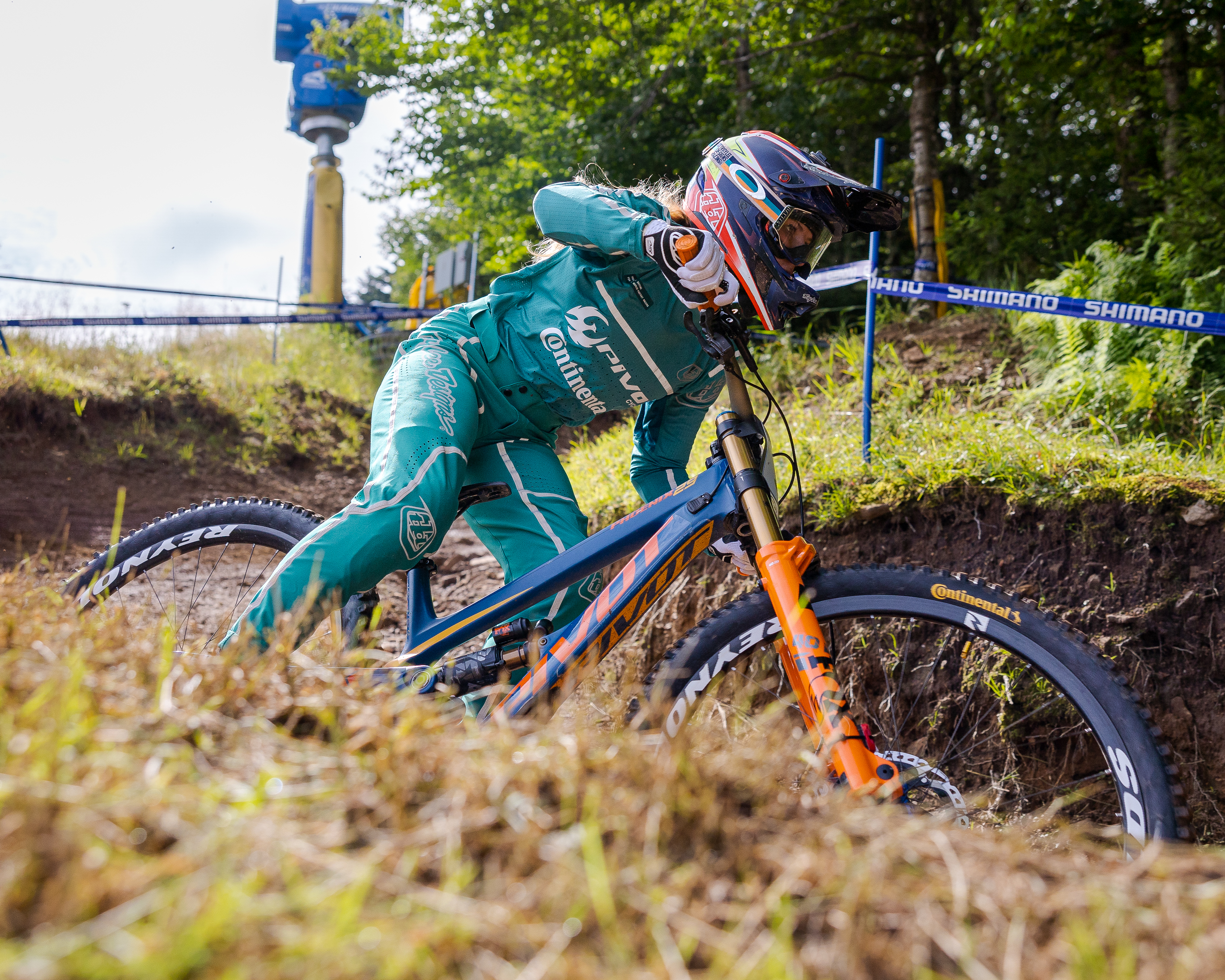
- Hastings at the 2022 UCI Downhill MTB World Cup in Snowshoe, West Virginia

Personal information
- Born: 10 May 2004 (age 22)

Cycling career
- Sport: Cycling
- Disciplines: downhill; enduro
- Role: Rider
- Rider type: downhill

Professional team
- 2022–present: Pivot Factory Racing
Medal record
Representing New Zealand
Women's cycle racing
World Championships
Gold medal – first place	2022 Les Gets	Junior downhill

Jenna Hastings (born 10 May 2004) is a New Zealand mountain biker competing in downhill and enduro. She is a former junior women's downhill world champion.

Hastings is from Rotorua where she attended John Paul College. At the secondary school’s mountain bike championships in October 2020 in Wellington, she won in both the enduro and downhill. Aged 15, she won the open-age 2019/2020 Giant 2W Gravity Enduro series with two wins and one second place. At the February 2021 DH National Championships held at the Christchurch Adventure Park, she secured the national title in the woman's junior (U19) category, with a time beaten only by the open woman's champion.

In November 2021, she won the UCI-sanctioned and open-age Crankworx Rotorua downhill competition. As the overall woman's winner of the Crankworx New Zealand series (four races in Alexandra, Queenstown, Cardrona, and Wānaka), she secured a contract with Pivot Factory Racing to race the 2022 UCI Mountain Bike World Cup in the junior elite women's downhill category.

In the 2022 season, she rode her inaugural junior women's (under-23) world cup race aged 17 in March in Lourdes, France, and came sixth. Two months later at her second world cup race in the Scottish Fort William, Hastings came fourth. Three weeks later at the next world cup race in the Austrian municipality Leogang, Hastings came in second place. A week later, she competed at Crankworx Innsbruck; she lost time through a fall and came in eleventh place riding in the elite women's category. In July at her fourth world cup race in Lenzerheide, Switzerland, she came third. A week later at her fifth world cup race in Vallnord, Andorra, she again came third. The German mountain-bike online magazine MTB News commented after Vallnord that "Jenna Hastings has firmly established herself at the top of the junior field" (Jenna Hastings hat sich an der Spitze des Juniorinnen-Feldes fest etabliert). At the fifth world cup race on 30 July 2022 in Snowshoe, West Virginia, USA, Hastings came fourth. At the 2022 UCI Mountain Bike World Championships, she took the world championship title in junior downhill.

Hastings suffered a broken ankle early in the 2024 season. In July she won the RockShox Canadian Open DH in Whistler, Canada.
