= Cycling at the 2020 Summer Olympics – Men's cross-country =

Olympic cycling event

Men's cross-country at the Games of the XXXII Olympiad
- Olympic mountain bike cycling
- Venue: Izu MTB Course
- Date: 26 July 2021
- Competitors: 38 from 29 nations
- Winning time: 1:25:14

Medalists
1st place, gold medalist(s)		Tom Pidcock	Great Britain
2nd place, silver medalist(s)		Mathias Flückiger	Switzerland
3rd place, bronze medalist(s)		David Valero	Spain

The men's cross-country mountain biking event at the 2020 Summer Olympics took place on 26 July 2021 at the Izu MTB Course, Izu, Shizuoka. 38 cyclists from 29 nations competed.

== Background ==
This was the 7th appearance of the event, which has been held at every Summer Olympics since mountain bike cycling was added to the programme in 1996.

The reigning Olympic champion was Nino Schurter of Switzerland, and the reigning (2020) World Champion was Jordan Sarrou of France.

A preview by Olympics.com noted Schurter (bronze in 2008, silver in 2012, and gold in 2016, along with 8 World Championships) as a favourite. Other contenders include Mathieu van der Poel of the Netherlands, Victor Koretzky of France, and Luca Braidot of Italy, while Tom Pidcock of Great Britain was rated as a talented outside bet for the title.

== Qualification ==
A National Olympic Committee (NOC) could enter up to 3 qualified cyclists in the cross-country. Quota places are allocated to the NOC, which selects the cyclists. Qualification is primarily through the UCI nation rankings, with 30 of the 38 quota places available through that pathway. The top 2 NOCs earned 3 quota places. NOCs ranked 3rd through 7th earned 2 quota places. NOCs ranked 8th through 21st earned 1 quota places. The second path to qualification was continental tournaments for Africa, the Americas, and Asia; the top NOC at each tournament (which had not already earned a quota place) received 1 place. The third path was the 2019 UCI Mountain Bike World Championships. The top 2 NOCs (without a quota place yet) in the Elite category earned a place; the top 2 NOCs in the U-23 category (without a quota, including through the Elite category) also earned a place. The host nation was reserved one place, to be reallocated through the rankings if Japan earned a place normally. Because qualification was complete by the end of the 2020 UCI Track Cycling World Championships on 1 March 2020 (the last event that contributed to the 2018–20 rankings), qualification was unaffected by the COVID-19 pandemic.

== Competition format ==
The competition is a mass-start, seven-lap race. There is only one round of competition. The mountain bike course is 4.1 kilometres (2.5 mi) long, with sudden changes in elevation, narrow dirt trails, and rocky sections. The vertical height is 150 metres (490 ft). Riders with times 80% slower than the leader's first lap are eliminated.

== Results ==
Result
Rank	#	Cyclist	Nation	Time	Diff.
1st place, gold medalist(s)	29	Tom Pidcock	Great Britain	1:25:14	
2nd place, silver medalist(s)	2	Mathias Flückiger	Switzerland	1:25:34	+ 0:20
3rd place, bronze medalist(s)	14	David Valero	Spain	1:25:48	+ 0:34
4	1	Nino Schurter	Switzerland	1:25:56	+ 0:42
5	7	Victor Koretzky	France	1:26:00	+ 0:46
6	13	Anton Cooper	New Zealand	1:26:00	+ 0:46
7	11	Vlad Dascălu	Romania	1:26:03	+ 0:49
8	10	Alan Hatherly	South Africa	1:26:33	+ 1:19
9	4	Jordan Sarrou	France	1:26:50	+ 1:36
10	8	Milan Vader	Netherlands	1:27:21	+ 2:07
11	21	Anton Sintsov	ROC	1:27:41	+ 2:27
12	17	Filippo Colombo	Switzerland	1:28:04	+ 2:50
13	3	Henrique Avancini	Brazil	1:28:09	+ 2:55
14	20	Christopher Blevins	United States	1:28:13	+ 2:59
15	25	Jofre Cullell	Spain	1:28:16	+ 3:02
16	30	Martín Vidaurre	Chile	1:28:33	+ 3:19
17	31	Max Foidl	Austria	1:28:45	+ 3:31
18	24	Jens Schuermans	Belgium	1:29:07	+ 3:53
19	19	Bartłomiej Wawak	Poland	1:29:10	+ 3:56
20	6	Gerhard Kerschbaumer	Italy	1:29:48	+ 4:34
21	15	Maximilian Brandl	Germany	1:29:49	+ 4:35
22	18	Sebastian Fini Carstensen	Denmark	1:30:28	+ 5:14
23	23	Gerardo Ulloa	Mexico	1:30:57	+ 5:43
24	28	Erik Hægstad	Norway	1:31:14	+ 6:00
25	12	Luca Braidot	Italy	1:31:30	+ 6:16
26	27	Peter Disera	Canada	1:31:45	+ 6:31
27	33	Luiz Cocuzzi	Brazil	1:32:21	+ 7:07
28	22	Manuel Fumic	Germany	1:32:28	+ 7:14
29	32	Kohei Yamamoto	Japan	1:32:35	+ 7:21
30	26	Daniel McConnell	Australia	1:33:12	+ 7:58
31	37	Alex Miller	Namibia	1:34:26	+ 9:12
32	35	András Parti	Hungary	1:35:33	+ 10:19
33	36	Shlomi Haimy	Israel	1:36:58	+ 11:44
34	16	Nadir Colledani	Italy	—	-1 LAP
35	34	Periklis Ilias	Greece	—	-3 LAP
36	38	Zhang Peng	China	—	-3 LAP
—	5	Ondřej Cink	Czech Republic	DNF	
—	9	Mathieu van der Poel	Netherlands	DNF	
