= Alessandra Keller =

Swiss cyclist (born 1996)

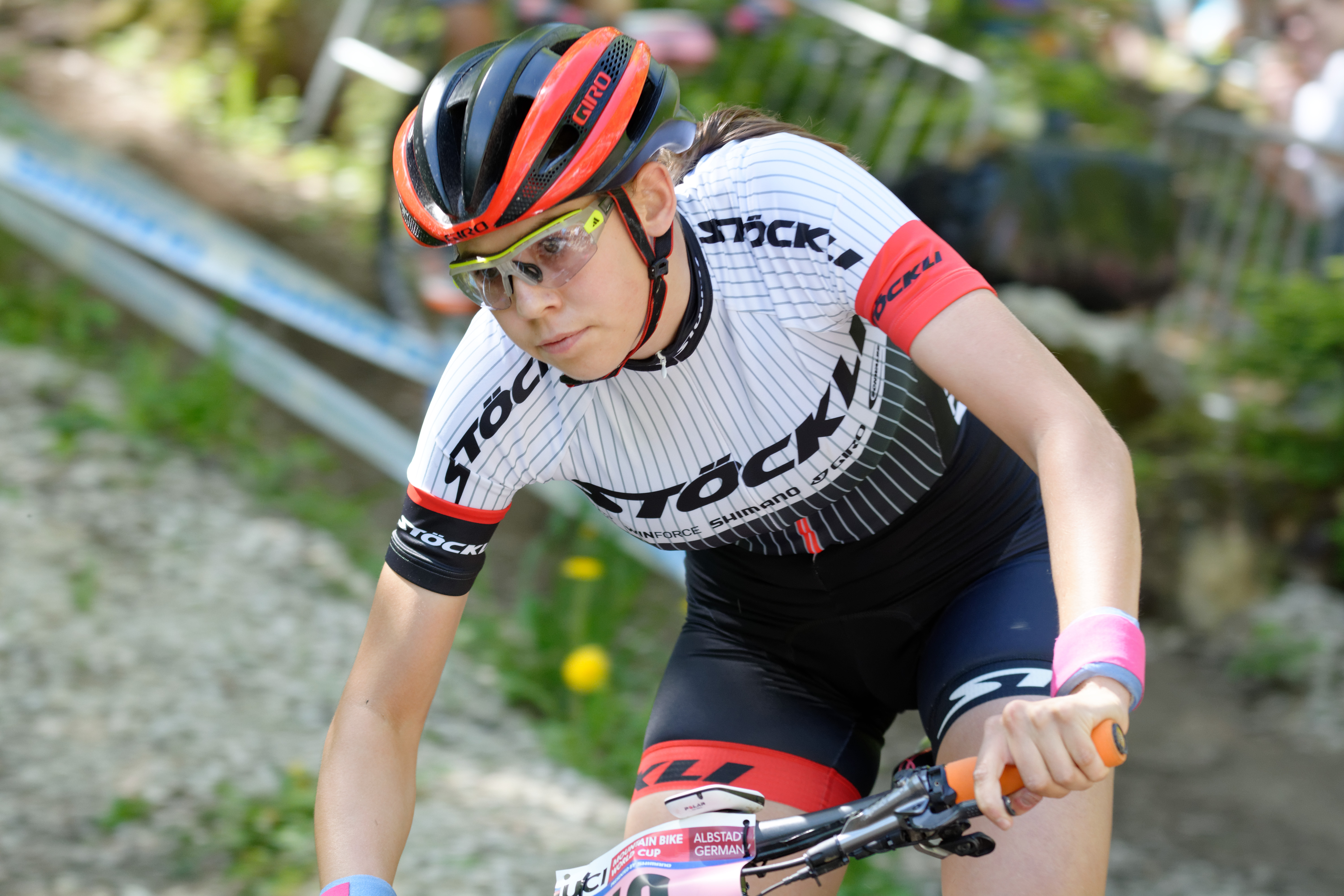
- Keller in 2016

Personal information
- Born: 27 January 1996 (age 30) Switzerland
- Height: 1.75 m (5 ft 9 in)

Cycling career
- Sport: Cycling
- Discipline: Cross-country
- Role: Rider

Major wins
- Cyclo-cross National Championships (2022, 2023, 2024, 2026) Mountain bike National XC Championships (2022, 2023) XC World Cup (2022) 2 individual wins (2022, 2025)
Medal record
Women's Mountain bike racing
Representing Switzerland
World Under-23 Championships
Gold medal – first place	2018 Lenzerheide	Cross-country
World Championships
Silver medal – second place	2022 Lenzerheide	XC short track

Alessandra Keller (born 27 January 1996) is a Swiss mountain biker competing in cross country. She competed in the 2024 Paris Olympics.

== Life ==
Keller was born in 1996. She lives in the municipality of Ennetbürgen in the canton of Nidwalden.

Alongside Jolanda Neff, she won the 2016 Swiss Epic, a mountain bike stage race. Aged 22 and still eligible to compete in the U23 category, she won the world cup race in Vallnord, Andorra, Short Track Cross-Country race in the elite class. In the cross country, she won the 2018 World Championship in the U23.

Keller has been Swiss cross-country champion four times: 2012 in the U17 category, 2013 in the U19 category, 2018 in the U23 category, and in 2022 in the elite class. She won silver at the 2022 MTB short track world championships in Les Gets, France, behind Pauline Ferrand-Prévot.

In 2024 she was in Les Gets in Switzerland where she won the short track mountain bike World Cup race there. She was at the time the leader of the series.

== Major results ==
=== Cyclo-cross ===
2021–2022
1st National Championships
1st Meilen
2022–2023
1st National Championships
Swiss Cup

2nd Hittnau

2023–2024
1st National Championships
2025–2026
1st National Championships

=== Mountain bike ===
2013
1st Cross-country, UCI World Junior Championships
1st Cross-country, National Junior Championships
UCI Junior XCO World Cup

1st Vallnord

3rd Cross-country, UEC European Junior Championships
2014
1st Cross-country, UEC European Junior Championships
2015
2nd Cross-country, National Under-23 Championships
UCI Under-23 XCO World Cup

2nd Albstadt
2nd Val di Sole

2016
1st Overall Swiss Epic (with Jolanda Neff)
3rd Cross-country, UCI World Under-23 Championships
2017
Swiss Bike Cup

1st Lugano
3rd Gränichen
3rd Basel

2nd Cross-country, UEC European Under-23 Championships
2018
1st Cross-country, UCI World Under-23 Championships
1st Cross-country, National Under-23 Championships
UCI XCC World Cup

1st Vallnord
3rd Val di Sole

Swiss Bike Cup

1st Monte Tamaro
1st Schaan
2nd Solothurn
2nd Gränichen
2nd Lugano

3rd Overall Swiss Epic (with Kathrin Stirnemann)
2019
Swiss Bike Cup

1st Monte Tamaro
2nd Basel

UCI XCC World Cup

2nd Vallnord

2020
Swiss Bike Cup

2nd Gstaad

2021
2nd Cross-country, National Championships
Swiss Bike Cup

2nd Savognin

2022
1st Cross-country, National Championships
1st Overall UCI XCO World Cup

1st Snowshoe
3rd Lenzerheide
5th Albstadt
5th Mont-Sainte-Anne

1st Overall UCI XCC World Cup

1st Pal–Arinsal
2nd Lenzerheide
3rd Mont-Sainte-Anne
3rd Val di Sole

Ökk Bike Revolution

1st Chur
2nd Huttwil

Swiss Bike Cup

1st Gstaad

2nd Short track, UCI World Championships
Copa Catalana Internacional

2nd Banyoles

5th Cross-country, UCI World Championships
2023
National Championships

1st Cross-country
1st Short track

Ökk Bike Revolution

1st Davos
2nd Engelberg

Swiss Bike Cup

1st Basel

2nd Overall UCI XCC World Cup

1st Pal–Arinsal
2nd Nové Město
2nd Lenzerheide
3rd Les Gets

5th Overall UCI XCO World Cup

2nd Vallnord
3rd Lenzerheide

5th Cross-country, UCI World Championships
2024
UCI XCC World Cup

1st Nové Město
1st Les Gets
2nd Crans-Montana
3rd Mairiporã

Ökk Bike Revolution

1st Engelberg
1st Davos
1st Gruyère
1st Huttwil

Swiss Bike Cup

1st Gränichen
3rd Rivera

UCI XCO World Cup

2nd Crans-Montana
3rd Nové Město
3rd Les Gets
4th Araxá
5th Mont-Sainte-Anne

2025
UCI World Championships

1st Short track
3rd Cross-country

1st Cross-country, National Championships
3rd Overall UCI XCO World Cup

1st Lenzerheide
2nd Pal–Arinsal
2nd Les Gets
4th Araxá I
4th Nové Město
5th Mont-Sainte-Anne

3rd Overall UCI XCC World Cup

1st Pal–Arinsal
2nd Les Gets
3rd Araxá I
3rd Lake Placid

Ökk Bike Revolution

1st Huttwil
2nd Engelberg

Swiss Bike Cup

1st Basel

UCI XCO World Cup

5th Nové Město
