= 2022 UCI Mountain Bike World Championships =

International sports competition

2022 World Championships
- Location: Les Gets, France
- Dates: 24 to 28 August 2022

The 2022 UCI Mountain Bike World Championships were held in the French commune Les Gets from 24 to 28 August 2022.

Les Gets, located in the Haute-Savoie department in the Auvergne-Rhône-Alpes region of France close to the border with Switzerland, previously hosted the 2004 UCI Mountain Bike & Trials World Championships. The Les Gets Bike Park, which is located within the Portes du Soleil ski area, has 128 km (80 mi) of marked trails and provides for downhill, cross-country, freestyle, freeride, and e-mountain biking.

== Competition format ==
The following competitions and rider categories were contested at this event of the UCI Mountain Bike World Championships:

Competition format
Event and categories	Year of birth
Cross country (XCO)
Men & women elite	1999 and older
Men & women U23	2000–2003
Men & women junior	2004 and 2005
Downhill (DHI)
Men & women elite	2003 and older
Men & women junior	2004 and 2005
E-mtb
Men & women elite	2003 and older (including masters)
Cross-country short track (XCC)
Men & women elite	1999 and older

In addition, a team relay was held restricted to one team of six riders per country. The default team composition was one man elite, one woman elite, one man U23, one man juniors, one woman U23 and one woman juniors, but the rules also allowed for substitutions.

== Medal summary ==
=== Medal table ===
* Host nation (France)

Rank	Nation	Gold	Silver	Bronze	Total
1	France*	5	4	3	12
2	Switzerland	4	5	4	13
3	New Zealand	2	0	0	2
4	Italy	1	1	2	4
5	Germany	1	1	0	2
6	Austria	1	0	0	1
6	Great Britain	1	0	0	1
8	Australia	0	1	0	1
8	Canada	0	1	0	1
8	Netherlands	0	1	0	1
8	Spain	0	1	0	1
12	United States	0	0	3	3
13	Colombia	0	0	1	1
13	Denmark	0	0	1	1
13	Poland	0	0	1	1
Totals (15 entries)		15	15	15	45

=== Men's events ===
The elite downhill saw an all-French podium, with Loïc Bruni winning his fifth elite downhill world championship. In the short track, New Zealand's Sam Gaze and the incumbent American world champion, Christopher Blevins, were competing for the title when both aimed for the same line at the last rock garden. Blevins crashed and eventually crossed the line in 16th place while Gaze took the title.

Event	Gold		Silver		Bronze	
Cross-country Olympic	Nino Schurter; Switzerland	1:21:13	David Valero; Spain	1:21:22	Luca Braidot; Italy	1:21:42
Cross-country short track	Sam Gaze; New Zealand	22:21	Filippo Colombo; Switzerland	22:24	Thomas Litscher; Switzerland	22:38
Electric MTB Cross-country	Jérôme Gilloux; France	52:21	Hugo Pigeon; France	52:50	Joris Ryf; Switzerland	53:03
Downhill	Loïc Bruni; France	3:20.478	Amaury Pierron; France	3:23.059	Loris Vergier; France	3:23.864

=== Women's events ===
Event	Gold		Silver		Bronze	
Cross-country Olympic	Pauline Ferrand-Prévot; France	1:22:08	Jolanda Neff; Switzerland	1:23:43	Haley Batten; United States	1:24:21
Cross-country short track	Pauline Ferrand-Prévot; France	21:56	Alessandra Keller; Switzerland	22:14	Gwendalyn Gibson; United States	22:17
Electric MTB Cross-country	Nicole Göldi; Switzerland	47:00	Justine Tonso; France	48:15	Nathalie Schneitter; Switzerland	48:25
Downhill	Valentina Höll; Austria	3:53.857	Nina Hoffmann; Germany	3:54.763	Myriam Nicole; France	3:57.304

=== Team event ===
Eighteen teams competed in the team event, with seventeen of those finishing. The French team was in the lead when their fifth rider crashed and had to finish the lap standing after having lost the saddle, dropping to fifth place. Switzerland won the world title ahead of Italy and the United States. New Zealand had been in third position when their third rider crashed; the team did not finish.

Event	Gold		Silver		Bronze	
Cross-country Olympic	Switzerland; Dario Lillo; Khalid Sidahmed; Ramona Forchini; Ronja Blöchlinger; Anina Hutter; Nino Schurter	1:17:14	Italy; Luca Braidot; Marco Betteo; Martina Berta; Valentina Corvi; Giada Specia; Simone Avondetto	1:17:20	United States; Christopher Blevins; Cayden Parker; Madigan Munro; Bailey Cioppa; Haley Batten; Riley Amos	1:17:28

=== Under-23 and Junior events ===
Event	Gold		Silver		Bronze	
Men's Under-23 Cross-country	Simone Avondetto; Italy	1:10:35	Mathis Azzaro; France	1:11:03	Luca Schätti; Switzerland	1:11:32
Men's Junior Cross-country	Paul Schehl; Germany	1:02:48	Jan Christen; Switzerland	1:03:06	Paul Magnier; France	1:03:12
Men's Junior Downhill	Jordan Williams; Great Britain	3:28.324	Remy Meier-Smith; Australia	3:34.240	Davide Cappello; Italy	3:36.021
Women's Under-23 Cross-country	Line Burquier; France	1:11:09	Puck Pieterse; Netherlands	1:11:52	Sofie Pedersen; Denmark	1:12:08
Women's Junior Cross-country	Monique Halter; Switzerland	59:37	Lea Huber; Switzerland	1:00:53	Natalia Grzegorzewska; Poland	1:01:03
Women's Junior Downhill	Jenna Hastings; New Zealand	4:18.541	Gracey Hemstreet; Canada	4:20.411	Valentina Roa; Colombia	4:34.485

== See also ==
- 2022 UCI Mountain Bike World Cup
