= Filippo Colombo =

Swiss cyclist (born 1997)

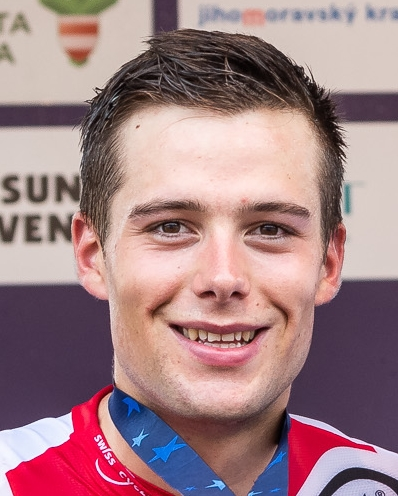

Personal information
- Born: 20 December 1997 (age 28)
- Height: 1.84 m (6 ft 0 in)
- Weight: 73 kg (161 lb)

Cycling career
- Sport: Cycling
- Disciplines: Cross-country; Road
- Role: Rider

Professional teams
- 2016–2019: BMC Mountainbike Racing Team
- 2020–2021: Absolute Absalon–BMC
- 2022: Swiss Racing Academy
- 2023: Q36.5 Pro Cycling Team

Major wins
- Mountain bike National XC Championships (2024, 2025) Cape Epic (2025)
Medal record
Representing Switzerland
Men's mountain bike racing
World Championships
Gold medal – first place	2018 Lenzerheide	Team relay
Gold medal – first place	2017 Cairns	Team relay
Silver medal – second place	2019 Mont-Sainte-Anne	U23 Cross-country
Silver medal – second place	2014 Lillehammer	Team relay
Bronze medal – third place	2016 Nové Město	Team relay
European Championships
Gold medal – first place	2017 Boario Terme	Team relay
Silver medal – second place	2018 Glasgow	U23 Cross-country
Silver medal – second place	2019 Brno	U23 Cross-country
Silver medal – second place	2018 Glasgow	Team relay
Bronze medal – third place	2021 Novi Sad	Cross-country
Bronze medal – third place	2022 Munich	Cross-country

Filippo Colombo (born 20 December 1997) is a Swiss cross-country mountain biker and road cyclist, who most recently rode for UCI ProTeam Q36.5 Pro Cycling Team.

He competed at the 2018 UCI Mountain Bike World Championships, winning a gold medal in the team relay.

== Major results ==
=== Mountain bike ===
2014
1st Cross-country, National Junior Championships
2nd Team relay, UCI World Championships
2016
3rd Team relay, UCI World Championships
2017
1st Team relay, UCI World Championships
1st Team relay, UEC European Championships
1st Cross-country, National Under-23 Championships
2018
1st Team relay, UCI World Championships
1st Cross-country, National Under-23 Championships
UEC European Championships

2nd Team relay
2nd Under-23 Cross-country

3rd Overall UCI Under-23 XCO World Cup
2019
1st Cross-country, National Under-23 Championships
2nd Cross-country, UCI World Under-23 Championships
2nd Cross-country, UEC European Under-23 Championships
2nd Overall UCI Under-23 XCO World Cup

1st Albstadt
1st Lenzerheide
1st Snowshoe
2nd Nové Město
2nd Val di Sole
3rd Vallnord

2021
3rd Cross-country, UEC European Championships
UCI XCC World Cup

3rd Snowshoe

2022
1st Short track, National Championships
2nd Short track, UCI World Championships
2nd Overall UCI XCC World Cup

1st Lenzerheide
1st Mont-Sainte-Anne
3rd Nové Město

UCI XCO World Cup

2nd Mont-Sainte-Anne

Copa Catalana Internacional

2nd Banyoles

3rd Cross-country, UEC European Championships
2023
Swiss Bike Cup

1st Gstaad
2nd Basel

2nd Stellenbosch
2024
1st Cross-country, National Championships
UCI XCO World Cup

3rd Mairiporã
4th Araxá
5th Val di Sole

2025
1st Cross-country, National Championships
1st Overall Cape Epic (with Nino Schurter)
2026
UCI XCO World Cup

3rd Nové Město

=== Road ===
2021
2nd Grand Prix Alanya
