= Vlad Dascălu =

Romanian cyclist (born 1997)

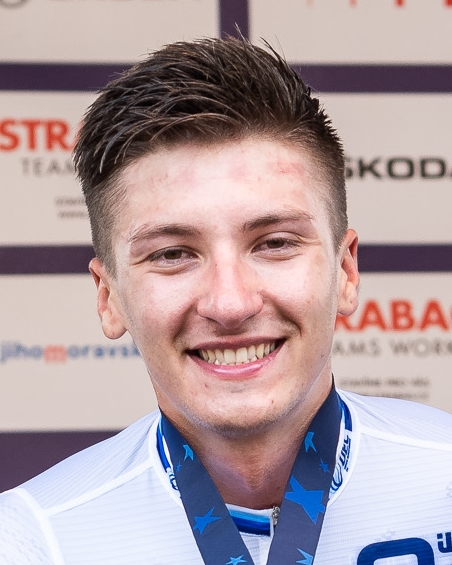
- Vlad Dascălu in 2019

Personal information
- Born: 17 December 1997 (age 28) Fălticeni, Romania

Cycling career
- Sport: Cycling
- Current team: Trek Factory Racing
- Discipline: Cross-country
- Role: Rider

Professional teams
- 2018–2019: Brújula Bike Racing Team
- 2020–: Trek Factory Racing

Major wins
- Mountain bike European XC Championships (2023)
Medal record
Representing Romania
Men's mountain bike racing
World Championships
Gold medal – first place	2019 Mont-Sainte-Anne	U23 Cross-country
European Games
Gold medal – first place	2023 Kraków-Małopolska	Cross-country
European Championships
Gold medal – first place	2019 Brno	U23 Cross-country
Gold medal – first place	2023 Krynica-Zdrój	Cross-country

Vlad Dascălu (born 17 December 1997) is a Romanian cross-country mountain biker.

Dascălu began cycling at the age of 14 with downhill competitions, before switching to cross country.

== Major results ==
2018
1st Cross-country, National Championships
UCI Under-23 XCO World Cup

1st Nové Město

2019
1st Cross-country, UCI World Under-23 Championships
1st Cross-country, UEC European Under-23 Championships
1st Cross-country, National Championships
1st Overall UCI Under-23 XCO World Cup

1st Nové Město
1st Vallnord
1st Les Gets
1st Val di Sole

2021
1st Cross-country, National Championships
UCI XCO World Cup

2nd Snowshoe

2022
UCI XCO World Cup

2nd Nové Město
3rd Petrópolis
3rd Albstadt

UCI XCC World Cup

2nd Leogang
2nd Snowshoe
3rd Vallnord

2023
1st Cross-country, UEC European Championships
UCI XCO World Cup

3rd Val di Sole
3rd Les Gets

5th Cross-country, UCI World Championships

== Doping violation ==
In May 21, 2024 Dascălu received a 17 month suspension for Anti-Doping Whereabouts rule violations.
