= 2019 UCI Mountain Bike World Cup =

Series of races for all-terrain bicyclists

Details
- Dates: April–September 2019
- Races: 7 (XCO); 8 (DHI)

Champions
- Male individual champion: (Switzerland) Nino Schurter (XCO) (France) Loïc Bruni (DH)
- Female individual champion: (United States) Kate Courtney (XCO) (Australia) Tracey Hannah (DH)

The 2019 Mercedes-Benz UCI Mountain Bike World Cup was a series of races in Olympic Cross-Country (XCO), Cross-Country Eliminator (XCE), and Downhill (DHI). Each discipline had an Elite Men and an Elite Women category. There were also under-23 categories in the XCO and junior categories in the DHI. The cross-country series and the downhill series each had seven rounds, some of which are held concurrently.

== Cross-country ==
=== Elite ===
Date	Venue	Podium (Men)	Podium (Women)
18–19 May	(Germany) Albstadt	Mathias Flückiger (SUI)	Kate Courtney (USA)
18–19 May	(Germany) Albstadt	Mathieu van der Poel (NED)	Jolanda Neff (SUI)
18–19 May	(Germany) Albstadt	Jordan Sarrou (FRA)	Yana Belomoyna (UKR)
25–26 May	(Czech Republic) Nové Město	Mathieu van der Poel (NED)	Kate Courtney (USA)
25–26 May	(Czech Republic) Nové Město	Nino Schurter (SUI)	Rebecca McConnell (AUS)
25–26 May	(Czech Republic) Nové Město	Mathias Flückiger (SUI)	Haley Smith (CAN)
6–7 July	(Andorra) Vallnord	Nino Schurter (SUI)	Anne Terpstra (NED)
6–7 July	(Andorra) Vallnord	Mathias Flückiger (SUI)	Jolanda Neff (SUI)
6–7 July	(Andorra) Vallnord	Henrique Avancini (BRA)	Yana Belomoyna (UKR)
13–14 July	(France) Les Gets	Nino Schurter (SUI)	Kate Courtney (USA)
13–14 July	(France) Les Gets	Gerhard Kerschbaumer (ITA)	Jolanda Neff (SUI)
13–14 July	(France) Les Gets	Henrique Avancini (BRA)	Elisabeth Brandau (GER)
3–4 August	(Italy) Val di Sole	Mathieu van der Poel (NED)	Pauline Ferrand-Prévot (FRA)
3–4 August	(Italy) Val di Sole	Mathias Flückiger (SUI)	Jolanda Neff (SUI)
3–4 August	(Italy) Val di Sole	Nino Schurter (SUI)	Jenny Rissveds (SWE)
10–11 August	(Switzerland) Lenzerheide	Mathieu van der Poel (NED)	Jenny Rissveds (SWE)
10–11 August	(Switzerland) Lenzerheide	Nino Schurter (SUI)	Anne Terpstra (NED)
10–11 August	(Switzerland) Lenzerheide	Mathias Flückiger (SUI)	Pauline Ferrand-Prévot (FRA)
7–8 September	(United States) Snowshoe	Lars Forster (SUI)	Pauline Ferrand-Prévot (FRA)
7–8 September	(United States) Snowshoe	Nino Schurter (SUI)	Anne Terpstra (NED)
7–8 September	(United States) Snowshoe	Maxime Marotte (FRA)	Annie Last (GBR)

=== Under 23 ===
Date	Venue	Podium (Men)	Podium (Women)
18–19 May	(Germany) Albstadt	Filippo Colombo (SUI)	Laura Stigger (AUT)
18–19 May	(Germany) Albstadt	Vlad Dascălu (ROM)	Ronja Eibl (GER)
18–19 May	(Germany) Albstadt	Antoine Philipp (FRA)	Haley Batten (USA)
25–26 May	(Czech Republic) Nové Město	Vlad Dascălu (ROM)	Haley Batten (USA)
25–26 May	(Czech Republic) Nové Město	Filippo Colombo (SUI)	Ronja Eibl (GER)
25–26 May	(Czech Republic) Nové Město	Simon Andreassen (DEN)	Laura Stigger (AUT)
6–7 July	(Andorra) Vallnord	Vlad Dascălu (ROM)	Ronja Eibl (GER)
6–7 July	(Andorra) Vallnord	Jofre Cullell (ESP)	Evie Richards (GBR)
6–7 July	(Andorra) Vallnord	Filippo Colombo (SUI)	Martina Berta (ITA)
13–14 July	(France) Les Gets	Vlad Dascălu (ROM)	Ronja Eibl (GER)
13–14 July	(France) Les Gets	Maximilian Brandl (GER)	Evie Richards (GBR)
13–14 July	(France) Les Gets	Sean Fincham (CAN)	Laura Stigger (AUT)
3–4 August	(Italy) Val di Sole	Vlad Dascălu (ROM)	Ronja Eibl (GER)
3–4 August	(Italy) Val di Sole	Filippo Colombo (SUI)	Evie Richards (GBR)
3–4 August	(Italy) Val di Sole	Jofre Cullell (ESP)	Laura Stigger (AUT)
10–11 August	(Switzerland) Lenzerheide	Filippo Colombo (SUI)	Martina Berta (ITA)
10–11 August	(Switzerland) Lenzerheide	Vlad Dascălu (ROM)	Ronja Eibl (GER)
10–11 August	(Switzerland) Lenzerheide	Jofre Cullell (ESP)	Haley Batten (USA)
7–8 September	(United States) Snowshoe	Filippo Colombo (SUI)	Evie Richards (GBR)
7–8 September	(United States) Snowshoe	Jofre Cullell (ESP)	Laura Stigger (AUT)
7–8 September	(United States) Snowshoe	Vlad Dascălu (ROM)	Loana Lecomte (FRA)

== Downhill ==
=== Elite ===
Date	Venue	Podium (Men)	Podium (Women)
27–28 April	(Slovenia) Maribor	Loïc Bruni (FRA)	Tahnée Seagrave (GBR)
27–28 April	(Slovenia) Maribor	Danny Hart (GBR)	Rachel Atherton (GBR)
27–28 April	(Slovenia) Maribor	Troy Brosnan (AUS)	Tracey Hannah (AUS)
1–2 June	(United Kingdom) Fort William	Amaury Pierron (FRA)	Rachel Atherton (GBR)
1–2 June	(United Kingdom) Fort William	Troy Brosnan (AUS)	Tracey Hannah (AUS)
1–2 June	(United Kingdom) Fort William	Loris Vergier (FRA)	Nina Hoffmann (GER)
8–9 June	(Austria) Leogang	Loïc Bruni (FRA)	Tracey Hannah (AUS)
8–9 June	(Austria) Leogang	Greg Minnaar (RSA)	Nina Hoffmann (GER)
8–9 June	(Austria) Leogang	Troy Brosnan (AUS)	Kate Weatherly (NZL)
5–6 July	(Andorra) Vallnord	Loïc Bruni (FRA)	Rachel Atherton (GBR)
5–6 July	(Andorra) Vallnord	Loris Vergier (FRA)	Marine Cabirou (FRA)
5–6 July	(Andorra) Vallnord	Troy Brosnan (AUS)	Tracey Hannah (AUS)
13–14 July	(France) Les Gets	Amaury Pierron (FRA)	Tracey Hannah (AUS)
13–14 July	(France) Les Gets	Loïc Bruni (FRA)	Marine Cabirou (FRA)
13–14 July	(France) Les Gets	Laurie Greenland (GBR)	Mariana Salazar (ESA)
2–3 August	(Italy) Val di Sole	Laurie Greenland (GBR)	Marine Cabirou (FRA)
2–3 August	(Italy) Val di Sole	Loïc Bruni (FRA)	Tracey Hannah (AUS)
2–3 August	(Italy) Val di Sole	Loris Vergier (FRA)	Camille Balanche (SUI)
9–10 August	(Switzerland) Lenzerheide	Amaury Pierron (FRA)	Marine Cabirou (FRA)
9–10 August	(Switzerland) Lenzerheide	Greg Minnaar (RSA)	Tracey Hannah (AUS)
9–10 August	(Switzerland) Lenzerheide	Loïc Bruni (FRA)	Emilie Siegenthaler (SUI)
6–7 September	(United States) Snowshoe	Danny Hart (GBR)	Marine Cabirou (FRA)
6–7 September	(United States) Snowshoe	Amaury Pierron (FRA)	Myriam Nicole (FRA)
6–7 September	(United States) Snowshoe	Charlie Harrison (USA)	Veronika Widmann (ITA)

=== Junior ===
Date	Venue	Podium (Men)	Podium (Women)
27–28 April	(Slovenia) Maribor	Thibaut Dapréla (FRA)	Valentina Höll (AUT)
27–28 April	(Slovenia) Maribor	Ethan Shandro (CAN)	Anna Newkirk (USA)
27–28 April	(Slovenia) Maribor	Kye A'Hern (AUS)	Mille Johnset (NOR)
1–2 June	(United Kingdom) Fort William	Thibaut Dapréla (FRA)	Anna Newkirk (USA)
1–2 June	(United Kingdom) Fort William	Luke Mumford (GBR)	Valentina Höll (AUT)
1–2 June	(United Kingdom) Fort William	Patrick Laffey (CAN)	Mille Johnset (NOR)
8–9 June	(Austria) Leogang	Thibaut Dapréla (FRA)	Valentina Höll (AUT)
8–9 June	(Austria) Leogang	Kye A'Hern (AUS)	Anna Newkirk (USA)
8–9 June	(Austria) Leogang	Matteo Iniguez (FRA)	Mille Johnset (NOR)
5–6 July	(Andorra) Vallnord	Matteo Iniguez (FRA)	Valentina Höll (AUT)
5–6 July	(Andorra) Vallnord	Lucas Cruz (CAN)	Anna Newkirk (USA)
5–6 July	(Andorra) Vallnord	Patrick Laffey (CAN)	Mille Johnset (NOR)
13–14 July	(France) Les Gets	Thibaut Dapréla (FRA)	Valentina Höll (AUT)
13–14 July	(France) Les Gets	Patrick Laffey (CAN)	Anna Newkirk (USA)
13–14 July	(France) Les Gets	Seth Sherlock (CAN)	Lauryne Chappaz (FRA)
2–3 August	(Italy) Val di Sole	Tuhoto-Ariki Pene (NZL)	Mille Johnset (NOR)
2–3 August	(Italy) Val di Sole	Žak Gomilšček (SLO)	Valentina Höll (AUT)
2–3 August	(Italy) Val di Sole	Kye A'Hern (AUS)	Anna Newkirk (USA)
9–10 August	(Switzerland) Lenzerheide	Seth Sherlock (CAN)	Valentina Höll (AUT)
9–10 August	(Switzerland) Lenzerheide	Janosch Klaus (SUI)	Nastasia Gimenez (FRA)
9–10 August	(Switzerland) Lenzerheide	Tuhoto-Ariki Pene (NZL)	Anna Newkirk (USA)
6–7 September	(United States) Snowshoe	Thibaut Dapréla (FRA)	Valentina Höll (AUT)
6–7 September	(United States) Snowshoe	Luke Meier-Smith (AUS)	Anna Newkirk (USA)
6–7 September	(United States) Snowshoe	Lucas Cruz (CAN)	Mille Johnset (NOR)

== World Cup standings ==
bold denotes race winners.

=== Cross-country ===
==== Men's ====
**Top 5 Men's Elite Standings**
Rank	Rider	GER (Germany)	CZE (Czech Republic)	AND (Andorra)	FRA (France)	ITA (Italy)	SUI (Switzerland)	USA (United States)	Total Points
1	(Switzerland) **Nino Schurter**	210	275	**350**	**325**	230	280	**325**	**1995**
2	(Netherlands) Mathieu van der Poel	325	**375**	DNS	199	**375**	**375**	DNS	**1649**
3	(Brazil) Henrique Avancini	140	230	285	260	250	195	195	**1565**
4	(Switzerland) Mathias Flückiger	**305**	195	255	128	260	205	DNS	**1348**
5	(France) Jordan Sarrou	188	160	205	145	115	94	190	**1097**

**Top 5 Men's Under 23 Standings**
Rank	Rider	GER (Germany)	CZE (Czech Republic)	AND (Andorra)	FRA (France)	ITA (Italy)	SUI (Switzerland)	USA (United States)	Total Points
1	(Romania) **Vlad Dascălu**	70	**90**	**90**	**90**	**90**	70	50	**550**
2	(Switzerland) Filippo Colombo	**90**	70	60	50	70	**90**	**90**	**520**
3	(Spain) Jofre Cullell	40	40	70	27	60	60	70	**367**
4	(Germany) Maximilian Brandl	5	27	40	70	16	12	60	**230**
5	(France) Clement Berthet	50	0	30	14	30	35	20	**179**

==== Women's ====
**Top 5 Women's Elite Standings**
Rank	Rider	GER (Germany)	CZE (Czech Republic)	AND (Andorra)	FRA (France)	ITA (Italy)	SUI (Switzerland)	USA (United States)	Total Points
1	(United States) **Kate Courtney**	**375**	**325**	190	**375**	117	170	220	**1772**
2	(Switzerland) Jolanda Neff	300	190	325	275	325	210	117	**1742**
3	(France) Pauline Ferrand-Prévot	50	170	150	240	**330**	285	**350**	**1575**
4	(Netherlands) Anne Terpstra	170	155	**320**	170	135	260	270	**1480**
5	(Australia) Rebecca McConnell	128	250	88	136	195	195	225	**1217**

**Top 5 Women's Under 23 Standings**
Rank	Rider	GER (Germany)	CZE (Czech Republic)	AND (Andorra)	FRA (France)	ITA (Italy)	SUI (Switzerland)	USA (United States)	Total Points
1	(Germany) **Ronja Eibl**	70	70	**90**	**90**	**90**	70	20	**500**
2	(Austria) Laura Stigger	**90**	60	30	60	60	0	70	**370**
3	(United Kingdom) Evie Richards	DNS	18	70	70	70	24	**90**	**342**
4	(Italy) Martina Berta	27	27	60	35	35	90	40	**314**
5	(United States) Haley Batten	60	**90**	35	7	27	60	24	**303**

=== Downhill ===
==== Men's ====
**Top 5 Men's Elite Standings**
Rank	Rider	SLO (Slovenia)	GBR (United Kingdom)	AUT (Austria)	AND (Andorra)	FRA (France)	ITA (Italy)	SUI (Switzerland)	USA (United States)	Total Points
1	(France) **Loïc Bruni**	**216**	85	**214**	**250**	200	167	180	150	**1462**
2	(France) Amaury Pierron	90	**240**	120	155	**250**	145	**222**	200	**1422**
3	(Australia) Troy Brosnan	160	190	170	180	155	84	155	115	**1209**
4	(United Kingdom) Danny Hart	160	132	143	130	37	121	160	250	**1133**
5	(France) Loris Vergier	25	190	82	185	132	140	105	84	**943**

**Top 5 Men's Junior Standings**
Rank	Rider	SLO (Slovenia)	GBR (United Kingdom)	AUT (Austria)	AND (Andorra)	FRA (France)	ITA (Italy)	SUI (Switzerland)	USA (United States)	Total Points
1	(France) **Thibaut Dapréla**	**60**	**60**	**60**	0	**60**	6	0	**60**	**306**
2	(Australia) Kye A'Hern	30	16	40	0	25	30	20	0	**161**
3	(Canada) Lucas Cruz	25	20	14	40	20	0	4	30	**153**
4	(Canada) Seth Sherlock	DNS	10	DNS	18	30	18	60	0	**136**
5	(Canada) Patrick Laffey	DNS	30	20	30	40	DNS	DNS	10	**130**

==== Women's ====
**Top 5 Women's Elite Standings**
Rank	Rider	SLO (Slovenia)	GBR (United Kingdom)	AUT (Austria)	AND (Andorra)	FRA (France)	ITA (Italy)	SUI (Switzerland)	USA (United States)	Total Points
1	(Australia) **Tracey Hannah**	190	210	**250**	140	**250**	210	210	130	**1590**
2	(France) Marine Cabirou	125	165	150	200	200	**240**	**230**	250	**1560**
3	(Italy) Veronika Widmann	75	122	110	100	107	155	85	170	**924**
4	(Germany) Nina Hoffmann	120	165	190	110	110	44	80	0	**819**
5	(United Kingdom) Rachel Atherton	200	**230**	70	**230**	DNS	DNS	DNS	DNS	**730**

**Top 5 Women's Junior Standings**
Rank	Rider	SLO (Slovenia)	GBR (United Kingdom)	AUT (Austria)	AND (Andorra)	FRA (France)	ITA (Italy)	SUI (Switzerland)	USA (United States)	Total Points
1	(Austria) **Valentina Höll**	**60**	40	**60**	**60**	**60**	40	**60**	**60**	**440**
2	(United States) Anna Newkirk	40	**60**	40	40	40	20	20	40	**300**
3	(Norway) Mille Johnset	20	20	20	20	0	**60**	DNS	20	**160**
4	(France) Lauryne Chappaz	10	10	5	0	20	10	10	DNS	**65**
5	(France) Nastasia Gimenez	DNS	DNS	DNS	5	DNS	5	40	DNS	**50**

== See also ==
- 2019 UCI Mountain Bike World Championships
