= Line Burquier =

French cyclist (born 2003)

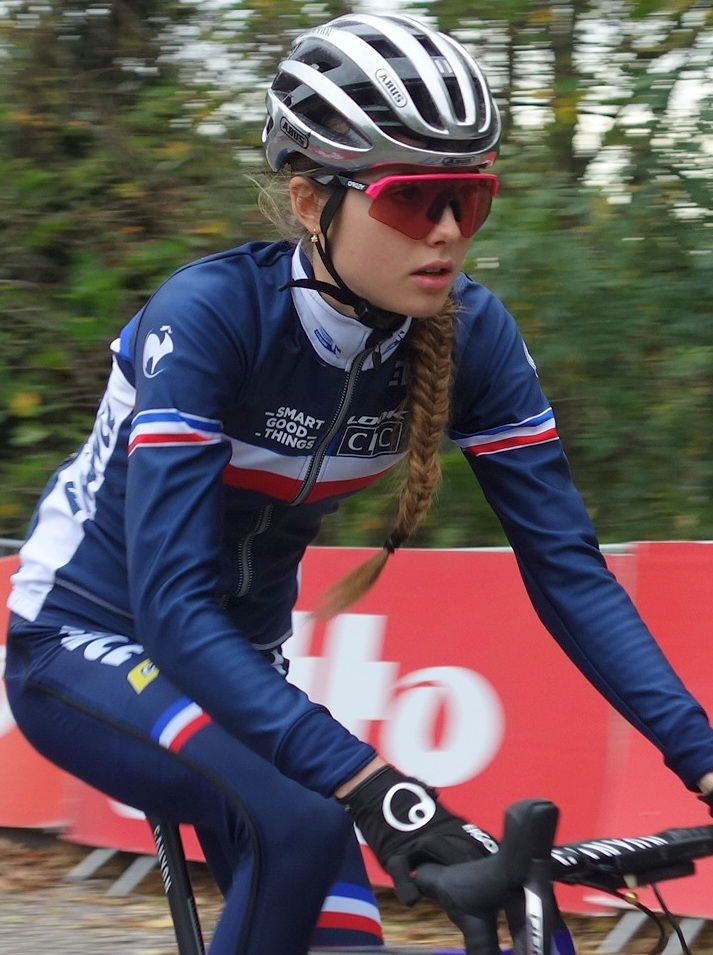
- Burquier in 2022

Personal information
- Born: 7 May 2003 (age 23) Saint-Paul-en-Chablais, France

Cycling career
- Sport: Cycling
- Current team: Trinity Racing
- Disciplines: Cross-country; Cyclo-cross
- Role: Rider

Professional teams
- 2022–2024: Canyon CLLCTV
- 2025–: Trinity Racing
Medal record
Women's cross-country cycling
Representing France
World Championships
Gold medal – first place	2021 Val di Sole	Team relay
Gold medal – first place	2021 Val di Sole	Junior
Gold medal – first place	2022 Les Gets	U23

Line Burquier (born 7 May 2003) is a French cyclist competing in cross-country mountain biking and cyclo-cross. At the 2021 UCI Mountain Bike World Championships, she won the gold medal with the French team in the cross-country relay and became world champion in the junior cross-country category. At the 2022 UCI Mountain Bike World Championships, she became world champion in the U23 cross-country.

== Major results ==
=== Mountain bike ===
2022
UCI Junior Series

1st Alpe d'Huez

2021
1st Cross-country, UCI World Junior Championships
1st Cross-country, UEC European Junior Championships
UCI Junior Series

1st Albstadt
1st Banyoles
2nd Haiming

Junior French Cup

1st Ussel

Junior Swiss Bike Cup

1st Leukerbad

2022
1st Cross-country, UCI World Under-23 Championships
1st Overall Under-23 UCI XCO World Cup

1st Petrópolis
1st Albstadt
1st Nové Město
1st Vallnord
1st Val di Sole
2nd Leogang
2nd Lenzerheide

French Cup

2nd Le Bessat
3rd Le Dévoluy

Swiss Bike Cup

2nd Gränichen

3rd Cross-country, National Championships
2023
2nd Team relay, UCI World Championships

=== Cyclo-cross ===
2019–2020
1st National Junior Championships
Coupe de France

2nd La Meziere

EKZ CrossTour

3rd Aigle

2020–2021
1st National Junior Championships
2nd Troyes
2021–2022
1st National Championships
Coupe de France

1st Pierric (Race 2)
1st Troyes (Race 1)
1st Troyes (Race 2)
2nd Pierric (Race 1)

2nd Jablines
3rd Brumath
4th UCI World Under-23 Championships
4th UEC European Under-23 Championships
2022–2023
1st Gernelle
1st Steinmaur
2nd National Championships
2nd UEC European Under-23 Championships

=== Road ===
2022
3rd Road race, National Under-23 Road Championships
