= Outcast Rider =

- Sport: Mountain bike
- Competition: Cape Epic
- Awarded for: Individual Finishers

History
- First award: 2010 as Outcast jersey 2018 as Leopard jersey
- Editions: 9 (as of 2019)

Old jersey until 2017

The Outcast Riders are UCI Pro-Elite Riders, whose partners give up or been removed from the Cape Epic. From 2010 until 2017 these riders worn the Outcast jersey, since the 2018 Cape Epic they wear the Leopard jersey.

== History ==
Kashi Leuchs lost his partner at the 2009 Cape Epic. He suggested the idea of the Outcast riders.

The organizers thought it's a great idea and implemented the new modus at the 2010 version.

== Rules ==
- It's not allowed to ride behind the Outcast Riders for all other riders.
- It's not allowed to assist any team with podium ambitions.
- They have to wear the official jersey.

== Former riders ==
=== 2010 ===
no information

=== 2011 ===
- David George (ZAF)

=== 2012 ===
no information

=== 2013 ===
- Alban Lakata (AUT)
- Jane Nüssli (GBR)

=== 2014 ===
- Konny Looser (CHE)
- José Antonio Hermida (ESP)
- Urs Huber (CHE)
- Darren Lill (ZAF)
- Daniel Gathof (GER)

=== 2015 ===
- Gunn Rita Dahle Flesjå (NOR)
- Konny Looser (CHE)
- Simon Stiebjahn (GER)
- Herman Pernsteiner (AUT)
- Adriaan Louw (ZAF)
- Sally Bigham (GBR)

=== 2016 ===
no information

=== 2017 ===
no information

=== 2018 ===
- Nino Schurter (CHE)
- Esther Süss (CHE)

=== 2019 ===
- Jaroslav Kulhavý (CZE)
- Samantha Sanders (ZAF)
