= Gwendalyn Gibson =

American cyclist

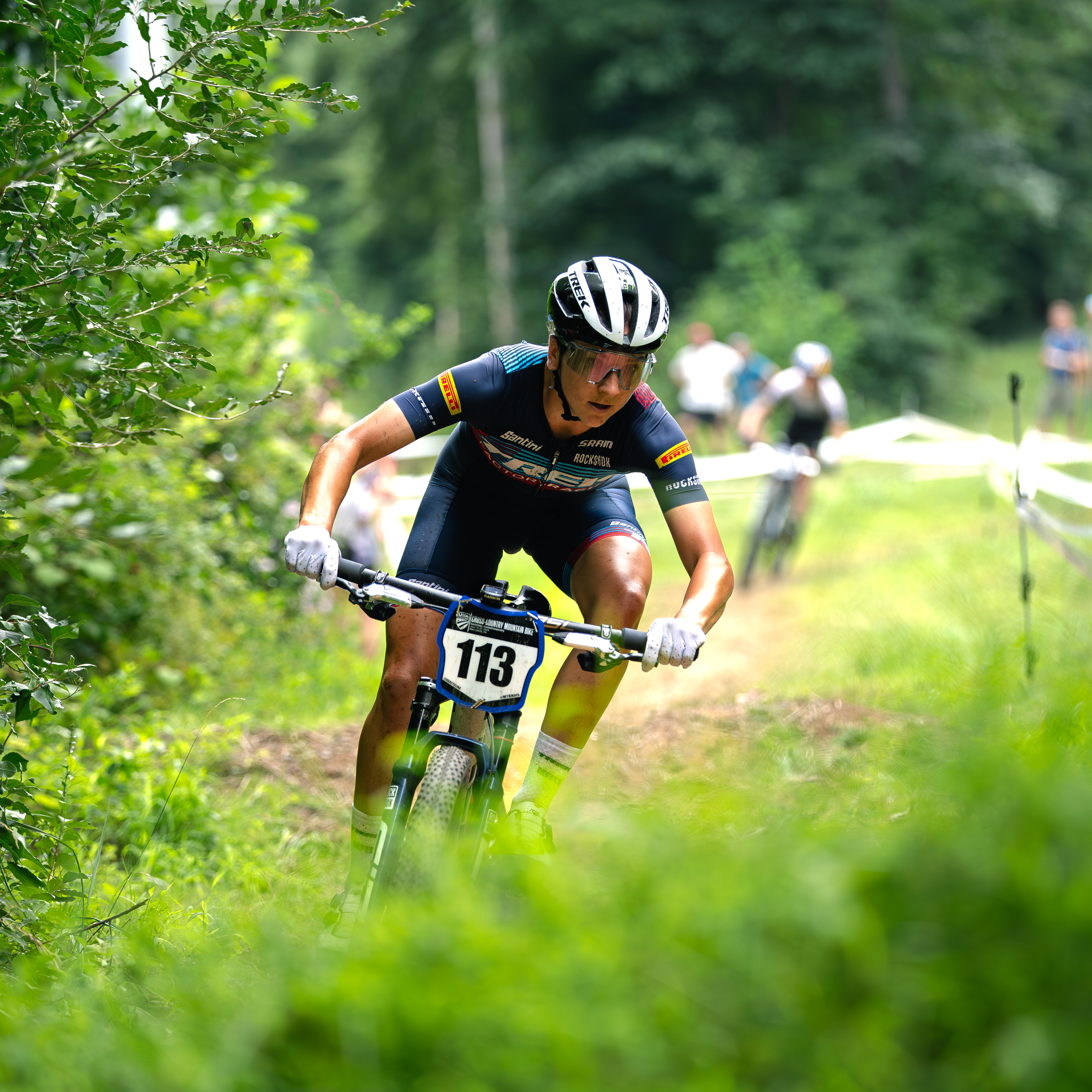
- Gibson in 2024

Cycling career
- Sport: Cycling
- Discipline: Cross-country
- Role: Rider
Medal record
Women's Mountain bike racing
Representing United States
World Championships
Bronze medal – third place	2022 Lenzerheide	XC short track

Gwendalyn Gibson is an American professional mountain bike rider from Southern California. She competes in cross-country, short track, and eliminator mountain bike racing. She was the 2016 national champion and competed at the 2017 worlds in Cairns, Australia.

She won her first World Cup at the UCI round in Snoeshow, West Virginia. She won bronze at the 2022 MTB short track world championships in Les Gets, France, behind winner Pauline Ferrand-Prévot and silver medalist Alessandra Keller.

Gibson continues to compete professionally and is considered one of the top American female mountain bikers in cross-country and short track racing. She aims to qualify for the 2024 Olympics in mountain biking.
