= Finn Iles =

Canadian professional mountain bike rider

Finnley Iles
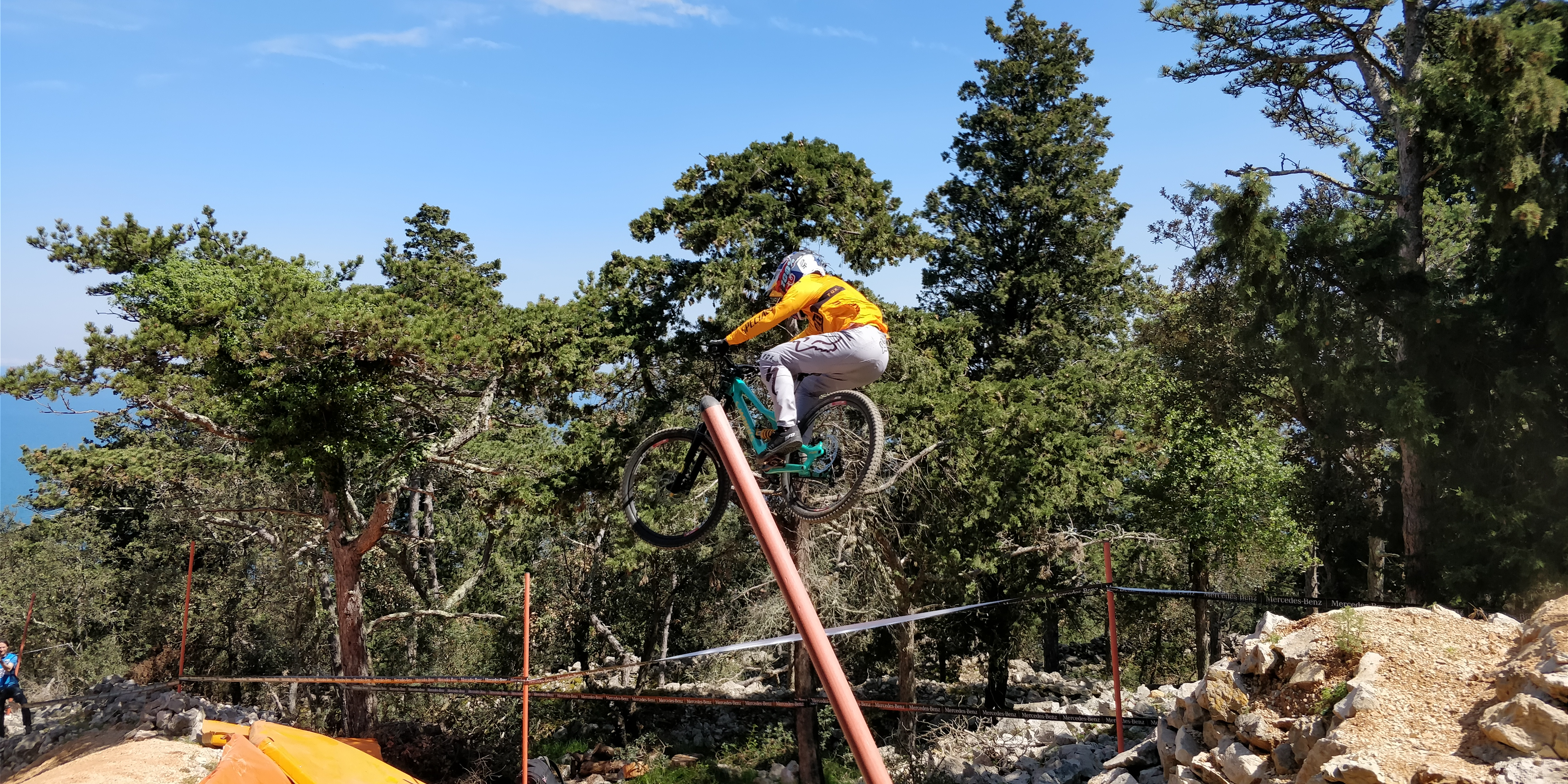
- Finn Iles at the 2018 UCI Downhill World Cup in Losinj, Croatia

Personal information
- Born: 15 August 1999 (age 27) Banff, Alberta
- Height: 5 ft 11 in (180 cm)

Cycling career
- Sport: Cycling
- Current team: Specialized Gravity
- Discipline: MTB
- Role: Rider
- Rider type: DH

Professional team
- Specialized Gravity
Medal record
Representing Canada
Mountain biking
World Championships
Gold medal – first place	2016 Val di Sole	Junior downhill
Bronze medal – third place	2024 Vallnord	Downhill

Finn Iles (born 15 August 1999) is a Canadian mountain bike racer competing in downhill cycling. He currently competes in the Mountain Bike World Cup points series races, in the Elite Downhill event.

== Results ==
=== Juniors ===
- 2nd British Downhill Series, Junior (Fort William, 2016)
- 2nd UCI Junior DH World Cup (Leogang, 2016)
- 2nd UCI Junior DH World Cup (Mont-Sainte-Anne, 2016)
- 2nd UCI Junior DH World Cup (Vallnord, 2016)
- 1st UCI Junior DH World Cup (Fort William, 2016)
- 1st UCI Junior DH World Cup (Lenzerheide, 2016)
- 1st Crankworx DH Juniors (Les Gets, 2016)
- 1st UCI Junior World Championships (Val di Sole, 2016)

=== Elite ===
- 5th UCI DH World Cup (Vallnord, 2018)
- 3rd Crankworx DH Rotorua (2018)
- 1st Crankworx Whistler Fox Air DH (2018)
- 1st Canadian National Championship (Panorama, 2019)
- 4th UCI DH World Cup (Fort William, 2019)
- 4th UCI DH World Cup (Maibor, 2020)
- 3rd Crankworx DH Innsbruck (2021)
- 4th UCI DH World Cup (Snowshoe, 2021)
- 2nd UCI DH World Cup (Lourdes, 2022)
- 2nd UCI DH World Cup (Lenzerheide, 2022)
- 3rd UCI DH World Cup (Vallnord, 2022)
- 1st UCI DH World Cup (Mont-Sainte-Anne, 2022)
