= Ronja Eibl =

German cyclist (born 1999)

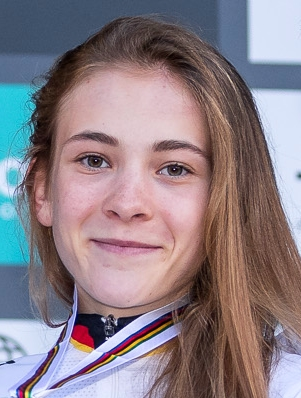
- Ronja Eibl in 2018.

Personal information
- Born: August 30, 1999 (age 27) Balingen, Germany
- Height: 167 cm (5 ft 6 in)
- Weight: 50 kg (110 lb)

Cycling career
- Sport: Cycling
- Current team: Alpecin–Fenix
- Disciplines: Cross-Country; Mountain bike racing
- Role: Rider
Medal record
World Championships
Silver medal – second place	2018 Lenzerheide	Team relay

Ronja Eibl (born August 1999) is a German cross-country cyclist.

She participated at the 2018 UCI Mountain Bike World Championships, winning a silver medal. She won the 2019 overall UCI Mountain Bike World Cup in U23, winning 3 rounds (Andorra, Les Gets, Val di Sole).
