= Amaury Pierron =

French mountain biker (born 1996)

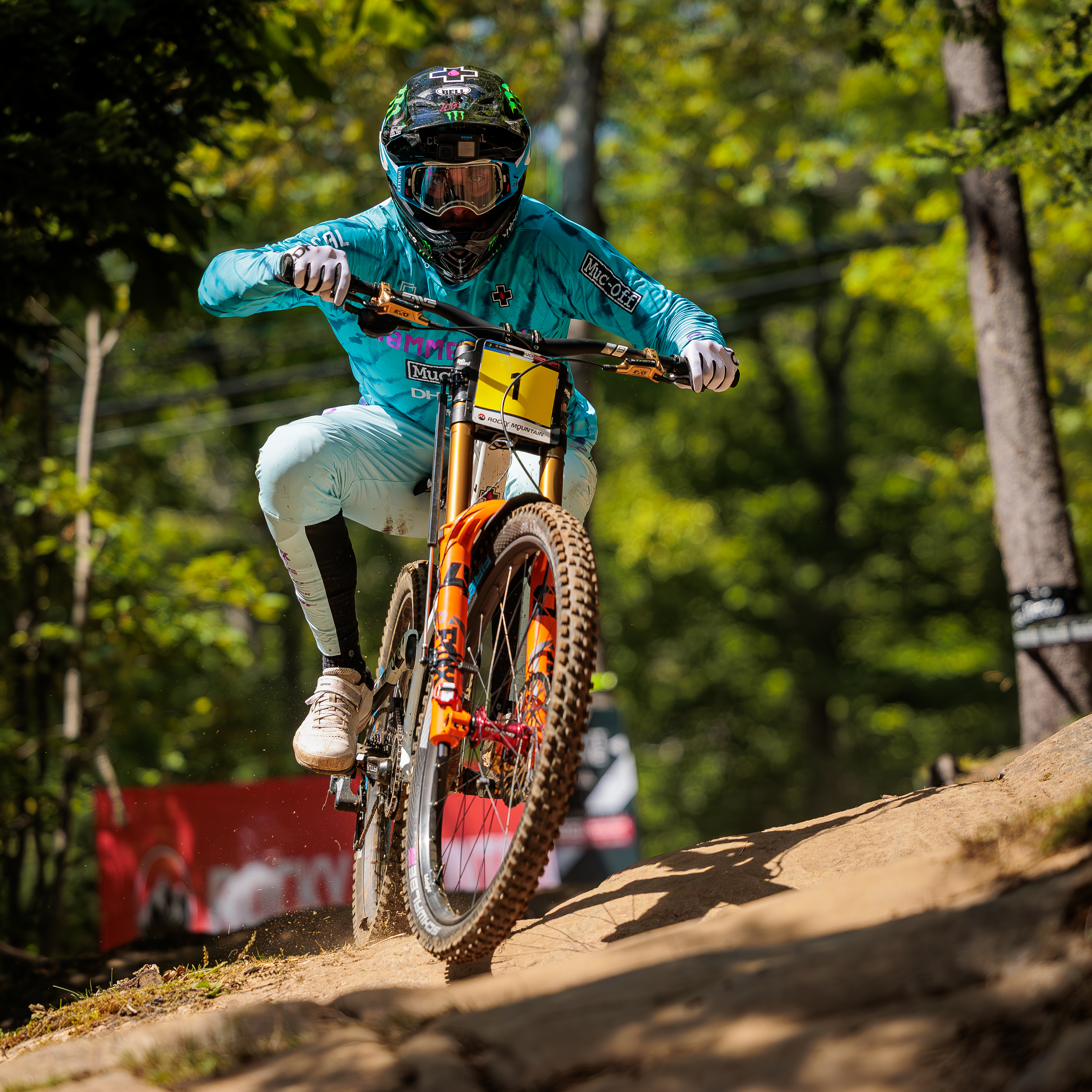

Personal information
- Nicknames: Maurice, Momo
- Born: 4 March 1996 (age 30) Brioude, France
- Height: 5 ft 11 in (180 cm)
- Weight: 81 kg (179 lb)

Cycling career
- Sport: Cycling
- Current team: Commencal / Muc Off
- Discipline: Downhill
- Role: Rider

Professional teams
- 2014–2017: Lac Blanc Commencal (originally Lac Blanc Scott)
- 2018–present: Commencal Vallnord DH Team (renamed to Commencal / Muc-Off)
Medal record
Representing France
Mountain bike racing
World Championships
Bronze medal – third place	2019 Mont-Sainte-Anne	Downhill

Amaury Pierron (born 4 March 1996) is a French downhill mountain biker. In 2019, he finished third in the UCI Downhill World Championships in Mont-Sainte-Anne, Canada. He also won three rounds and the overall classification of the 2018 UCI Downhill World Cup. In the 2019 edition, he again won three rounds but finished second overall to Loïc Bruni. His older brother Baptiste and his younger brother Antoine also compete in downhill racing.
