= Vallnord =

Ski resort in Andorra

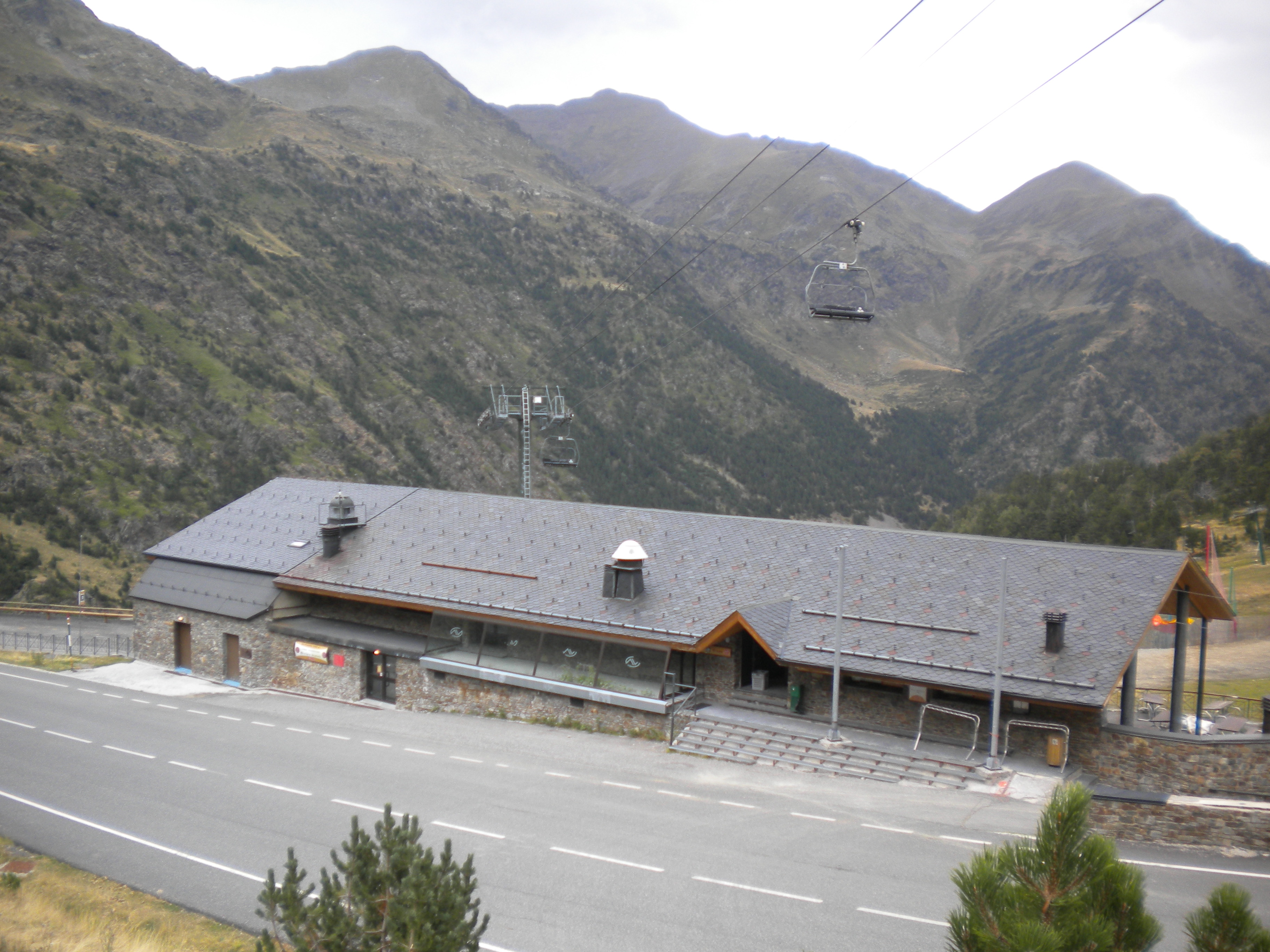
- The Ordino-Arcalís ski resort at Vallnord

- Location within Andorra Location within Pyrenees
- Location: La Massana and Ordino, Andorra
- Nearest city: Andorra la Vella
- Coordinates: 42°32′34.01″N 1°29′32.73″E
- Top elevation: 2,625 m (8,612 ft) (Arcalis)
- Base elevation: 1,550 m (5,090 ft) (Pal-Arinsal)
- Trails: 69 total; 42 at Pal-Arinsal; 27 at Arcalis
- Total length: 93 km (58 mi) total; 63 km (39 mi) at Pal-Arinsal; 30 km (19 mi) at Arcalis
- Lift system: 44 total; 30 at Pal-Arinsal; 14 at Arcalis
- Snowmaking: 397 snow cannons total; 296 cannons (Pal-Arinsal); 101 cannons (Arcalis)
- Website: www.vallnord.com

Vallnord (Catalan pronunciation: [ˌbaʎˈnɔɾt]) is a ski/snowboard resort in the Pyrenees mountains in the country of Andorra, close to the border with Spain at Tor, Pallars.

== Overview ==
It encompasses the linked sectors of Pal and Arinsal (the sectors were linked by a cable car, opened in 2005, from the top of the Arinsal sector) and the Ordino-Arcalis sector some kilometres away.

All the separate sectors within Vallnord contain green, blue, red and black rated runs as well as restaurants and ski schools.

== Cycling ==
In mountain biking, Vallnord was the venue for events during the 2008, 2009, 2013, 2017, 2019 and 2022 UCI Mountain Bike World Cup. The 2015 UCI Mountain Bike & Trials World Championships were held in Vallnord.

In road cycling, Arcalis was used for a stage finish in the 1994 Vuelta a España, and Pal as a stage finish in the 2010 Vuelta a España. Vallnord was used for stage finishes in the 2007, 2009 and 2011 Volta a Catalunya. Stage 10 of the 1997 Tour de France, Stage 7 of the 2009 Tour de France and Stage 9 of the 2016 Tour de France also all finished at Arcalis.
