= Snowshoe, West Virginia =

- Unincorporated community
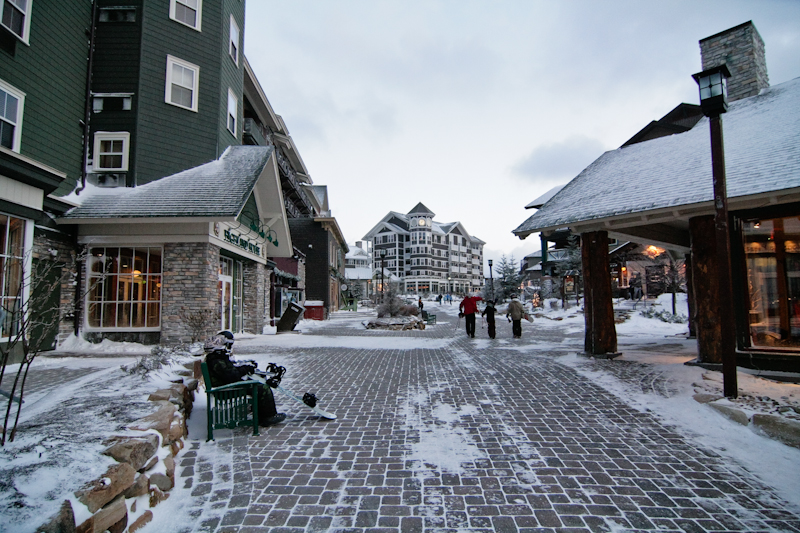
- The Village at Snowshoe Mountain

- Flag
- Motto: Forever Wild
- Location of Snowshoe, West Virginia
- Coordinates: 38°24′35″N 80°0′51″W
- Country: United States
- State: West Virginia
- County: Pocahontas
- Founded: 1974
- Elevation: 4,849 ft (1,478 m)

Population (2000)
  - Total: 163
- Time zone: UTC-5 (EST)
  - Summer (DST): UTC-4 (EDT)
- ZIP Code: 26209
- Area code: 304
- GNIS feature ID: 1557891
- Exchange: 572
- Website: snowshoemtn.com

Snowshoe is an unincorporated community in Pocahontas County, West Virginia, United States, centering on the Snowshoe Mountain ski resort. It is situated in the Allegheny Mountains at a bowl shaped convergence of two high mountain ridges — Cheat and Back Allegheny Mountains — at the head of the Shavers Fork of the Cheat River. Snowshoe is site of the second highest point in the state and the peak elevation for Cheat Mountain, at Thorny Flat, which reaches 4,848 feet (1,478 m) above sea level.

Snowshoe has several commercial areas, with the most prominent being The Village at Snowshoe, located at the summit of the mountain (rather than at its base). While the area is still best known for winter activities, today the resort has extensive mountain biking trails, a popular golf course, wedding and convention areas, a number of summer outdoor activities, and also hosts a Grand National Cross Country racing event. About 480,000 skiers visit the area each year, primarily from West Virginia and the larger cities of the Mid-Atlantic and Southeast.

Snowshoe Mountain's large property includes several developed resort areas, a conservation area, and expansive backcountry that covers 10,950 acres (44.31 km^{2}) in total. Ski slopes make up 244 acres (0.99 km^{2}) of the resort, which include the Snowshoe Basin, Western Territory, and Silver Creek areas.

== History ==
The area, then indistinct from Slatyfork, had been logged from about 1905 to 1960, after which it was abandoned. Thomas "Doc" Brigham discovered the mountain and believed it would be a good location to build a new ski resort. Brigham, a dentist from North Carolina, had previously opened the Sugar Mountain and Beech Mountain ski areas. Snowshoe Mountain opened to skiing on December 13, 1974.

== Climate ==
With a mean temperature of 22.1 °F (−5.5 °C) (as seen in the climate box below) in January and 62.6 °F (17.0 °C) in July, Snowshoe can be considerably cooler than nearby areas at lower elevations. The average winter season is just slightly more than 130 days each year, while the spring, summer, and fall seasons typically include a series of sports, recreation, and cultural events.

Snowshoe has a humid continental climate (Dfb).

The resort's altitude at almost a mile high provides for weather conditions that more closely resemble the rigorous winters of Northern New England than the milder climate of the Upland South. The massive horseshoe formed by the Cheat Mountain Range creates its own micro-climate, frequently affected by orographic lift of mid-level Great Lake moisture-laden fronts, resulting in massive snowfalls. Snowshoe averages over 13 feet of natural snow per year.

Climate data for Snowshoe, West Virginia (1991–2020 normals, extremes 1975–present)
Month	Jan	Feb	Mar	Apr	May	Jun	Jul	Aug	Sep	Oct	Nov	Dec	Year
Record high °F (°C)	57 (14)	63 (17)	76 (24)	79 (26)	82 (28)	86 (30)	90 (32)	85 (29)	86 (30)	78 (26)	72 (22)	64 (18)	87 (31)
Mean maximum °F (°C)	50.8 (10.4)	51.8 (11.0)	60.2 (15.7)	70.3 (21.3)	74.1 (23.4)	76.9 (24.9)	77.8 (25.4)	76.8 (24.9)	74.8 (23.8)	68.5 (20.3)	60.1 (15.6)	52.2 (11.2)	79.1 (26.2)
Mean daily maximum °F (°C)	29.8 (−1.2)	31.8 (−0.1)	38.9 (3.8)	51.0 (10.6)	59.7 (15.4)	66.6 (19.2)	69.8 (21.0)	68.8 (20.4)	63.5 (17.5)	53.3 (11.8)	42.0 (5.6)	34.1 (1.2)	50.8 (10.4)
Daily mean °F (°C)	22.1 (−5.5)	23.9 (−4.5)	30.8 (−0.7)	42.0 (5.6)	51.4 (10.8)	59.0 (15.0)	62.6 (17.0)	61.7 (16.5)	56.3 (13.5)	45.7 (7.6)	34.6 (1.4)	27.0 (−2.8)	43.1 (6.2)
Mean daily minimum °F (°C)	14.3 (−9.8)	15.9 (−8.9)	22.8 (−5.1)	33.0 (0.6)	43.2 (6.2)	51.3 (10.7)	55.4 (13.0)	54.6 (12.6)	49.1 (9.5)	38.1 (3.4)	27.2 (−2.7)	19.8 (−6.8)	35.4 (1.9)
Mean minimum °F (°C)	−7.6 (−22.0)	−4.0 (−20.0)	3.3 (−15.9)	15.0 (−9.4)	28.5 (−1.9)	40.4 (4.7)	47.8 (8.8)	46.9 (8.3)	35.8 (2.1)	22.1 (−5.5)	9.6 (−12.4)	0.8 (−17.3)	−10.3 (−23.5)
Record low °F (°C)	−36 (−38)	−20 (−29)	−8 (−22)	1 (−17)	16 (−9)	29 (−2)	36 (2)	33 (1)	25 (−4)	11 (−12)	−4 (−20)	−26 (−32)	−36 (−38)
Average precipitation inches (mm)	6.06 (154)	4.95 (126)	5.97 (152)	5.17 (131)	5.84 (148)	5.71 (145)	4.87 (124)	4.76 (121)	4.42 (112)	4.10 (104)	4.47 (114)	6.22 (158)	62.54 (1,589)
Average snowfall inches (cm)	35.5 (90)	31.4 (80)	27.2 (69)	8.5 (22)	0.8 (2.0)	0.0 (0.0)	0.0 (0.0)	0.0 (0.0)	0.0 (0.0)	2.8 (7.1)	9.7 (25)	28.8 (73)	144.7 (368)
Average extreme snow depth inches (cm)	16.3 (41)	16.5 (42)	15.1 (38)	5.0 (13)	0.3 (0.76)	0.0 (0.0)	0.0 (0.0)	0.0 (0.0)	0.0 (0.0)	1.5 (3.8)	6.7 (17)	13.2 (34)	25.7 (65)
Average precipitation days (≥ 0.01 in)	23.6	19.4	19.8	17.2	18.4	17.7	17.6	17.3	14.8	15.1	16.4	21.0	218.3
Average snowy days (≥ 0.1 in)	12.3	10.7	8.4	3.3	0.7	0.0	0.0	0.0	0.0	1.4	4.7	9.3	50.8
Source: NOAA

== Popular culture ==
- Snowshoe as well as the Top of the World Ski Resort is a location in the game Fallout 76
