= Dutch National Mountain Bike Championships =

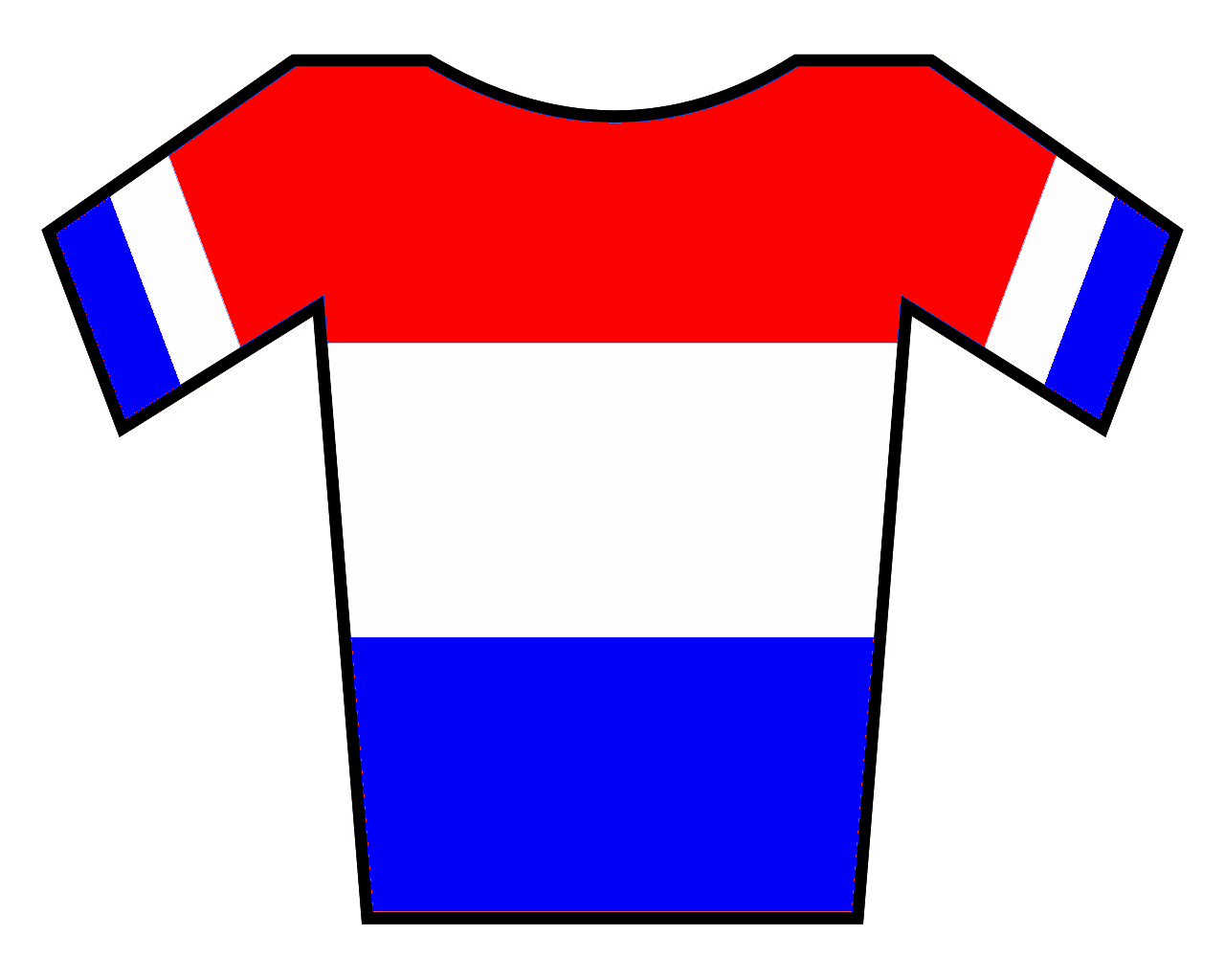
- The champion's jersey

Race details
- Region: Netherlands
- Discipline: Mountain biking
- Type: National championship
- Organiser: Royal Dutch Cycling Union

History
- First edition: 1988

The Dutch National Mountain Bike Championships are held annually to decide the cycling champions the mountain biking discipline, across various categories.

== Men ==
=== Cross-country ===
Year	Winner	Second	Third
1988	Jim van Overbeek		
1989	Henk Baars		
1990	Wim de Vos		
1991	Frank van Bakel		
1992	Marcel Arntz		Bart Brentjens
1993	Marcel Arntz	Hans Steekers	
1994	Marcel Arntz	Bart Brentjens	
1995	Bart Brentjens	Marcel Gerritsen	Richard Groenendaal
1996	Bart Brentjens	Patrick Tolhoek	Richard Groenendaal
1997	Richard Groenendaal	Bart Brentjens	Bas van Dooren
1998	Patrick Tolhoek	Bas van Dooren	Erik Boezewinkel
1999	Bas van Dooren	Bart Brentjens	Patrick Tolhoek
2000	Bart Brentjens	Bas van Dooren	Gerben de Knegt
2001	Bart Brentjens	Bas van Dooren	Bas Peters
2002	Bart Brentjens	Gerben de Knegt	Bas van Dooren
2003	Bart Brentjens	Thijs Al	Bas Peters
2004	Bart Brentjens	Maarten Tjallingii	Erwin Bakker
2005	Bart Brentjens	Bas Peters	Erwin Bakker
2006	Bart Brentjens	Rudi van Houts	Thijs Al
2007	Bart Brentjens	Rudi van Houts	Bas Peters
2008	Thijs Al	Rudi van Houts	Bas Peters
2009	Thijs Al	Gerben de Knegt	Jelmer Pietersma
2010	Rudi van Houts	Bas Peters	Frank Schotman
2011	Rudi van Houts	Hans Becking	Henk Jaap Moorlag
2012	Hans Becking	Frank Schotman	Bas Peters
2013	Michiel van der Heijden	Rudi van Houts	Thijs Al
2014	Michiel van der Heijden	Niels Wubben	Hans Becking
2015	Michiel van der Heijden	Hans Becking	Rudi van Houts
2016	Hans Becking	Rudi van Houts	Michiel van der Heijden
2017	Michiel van der Heijden	Hans Becking	Milan Vader
2018	Mathieu van der Poel	Hans Becking	Michiel van der Heijden
2019	Milan Vader	David Nordemann	Hans Becking
2020	Milan Vader	Jeroen van Eck	Erik Groen
2021	Milan Vader	David Nordemann	Bas Peters
2022	David Nordemann	Stan Godrie	Wim de Bruin
2023	Morris Gruiters	Frits Biesterbos	Rens Teunissen van Manen

=== Cross-country eliminator ===
Year	Winner	Second	Third
2016	Daniel Prijkel	Milan Vader	Lehvi Braam
2017	Jeroen van Eck	Daniel Prijkel	Carlo van den Berg
2018	Jeroen van Eck	Ian Schumacher	Demiz Hebing
2019	Jeroen van Eck	Lehvi Braam	Kyle Agterberg

=== Marathon ===
Year	Winner	Second	Third
2005	Bart Brentjens		
2006	Bas Peters	Ramses Bekkenk	Rick Evers
2008	Ramses Bekkenk	Bart Brentjens	Jelmer Pietersma
2009	Bart Brentjens		
2010	Frank Schotman	Axel Bult	Niels Wubben
2011	Bas Peters	Bram Rood	Bart Brentjens
2012	Ramses Bekkenk	Frank Schotman	Jeroen Boelen
2014	Bram Rood	Ronan van Zandbeek	Rob van Der Werf
2015	Ronan van Zandbeek	Bas Peters	Hans Becking
2016	Jasper Ockeloen	Marco Minnaard	Rudi van Houts
2017	Lars Boom	Jasper Ockeloen	Robbert de Nijs
2018	Lars Boom	Jasper Ockeloen	Gert-Jan Bosman
2019	Hans Becking	Lars Boom	Thom Bonder
2020	Cancelled because of Covid		
2021	Hans Becking	Tim Smeenge	Lennart van Houwelingen
2022	Tim Smeenge	Stan Godrie	Hans Becking

=== Beach race ===
Year	Winner	Second	Third
2014	Jasper Ockeloen	Jeroen Boelen	Bram Imming
2015 (Jan)	Richard Jansen	Bram Imming	Sebastian Langeveld
2015 (Dec)	Thijs Zonneveld	Jasper Ockeloen	Roy Beukers
2017	Ronan van Zandbeek	Richard Jansen	Thijs Zonneveld
2018	Jasper Ockeloen	Robbert de Nijs	Ronan van Zandbeek
2019	Coen Vermeltfoort	Jasper Ockeloen	Bram Rood
2020	Ivar Slik	Rick van Breda	Jordy Buskermolen
2021	Cancelled because of Covid		
2022	Rick van Breda	Roel van Sintmaartensdijk	Jasper Ockeloen
2023	Jules De Cock	Ivar Slik	Thijs Zonneveld
2024 (Feb)	Daan van Sintmaartensdijk	Jasper Ockeloen	Thijs Zonneveld
2024 (Dec)	Rick van Breda	Pepijn Veenings	Stijn Appel

== Women ==
=== Cross-country ===
Year	Winner	Second	Third
1995	Loes van Wersch	Vanessa van Dijk	Reza Hormes-Ravenstijn
1996	Loes van Wersch	Sandra Coppoolse	Inge Velthuis
1997	Yvonne Brunen	Corine Dorland	Elsbeth van Rooy-Vink
1998	Elsbeth van Rooy-Vink	Vanessa van Dijk	Corine Dorland
1999	Corine Dorland	Loes van Wersch	Yvonne Brunen
2000	Corine Dorland	Daphny van den Brand	Tessa Sollaart
2001	Corine Dorland	Elsbeth van Rooy-Vink	Daphny van den Brand
2002	Daphny van den Brand	Corine Dorland	Bernadine Boog-Rauwerda
2003	Elsbeth van Rooy-Vink	Saskia Elemans	Laura Turpijn
2004	Elsbeth van Rooy-Vink	Corine Dorland	Bernadine Boog-Rauwerda
2005	Bernadine Boog-Rauwerda	Elsbeth van Rooy-Vink	Ariëlle van Meurs
2006	Elsbeth van Rooy-Vink	Laura Turpijn	Bernadine Boog-Rauwerda
2007	Laura Turpijn	Bernadine Boog-Rauwerda	Elsbeth van Rooy-Vink
2008	Elsbeth van Rooy-Vink	Laura Turpijn	Ariëlle van Meurs
2009	Laura Turpijn	Reza Hormes-Ravenstijn	Monique Zeldenrust
2010	Laura Turpijn	Ariëlle Boek	Anne Terpstra
2011	Laura Turpijn	Sanne van Paassen	Anne Terpstra
2012	Laura Turpijn	Rozanne Slik	Anne Terpstra
2013	Anne Terpstra	Annefleur Kalvenhaar	Mirre Stallen
2014	Anne Terpstra	Annemarie Worst	Laura Turpijn
2015	Anne Terpstra	Laura Turpijn	Britt van den Boogert
2016	Anne Terpstra	Annemarie Worst	Anne Tauber
2017	Anne Tauber	Anne Terpstra	Annemarie Worst
2018	Anne Terpstra	Anna van der Breggen	Annemarie Worst
2019	Anne Tauber	Annemarie Worst	Sophie Von Berswordt
2020	Anne Terpstra	Anne Tauber	Lotte Koopmans
2021	Anne Tauber	Sophie von Berswordt	Lotte Koopmans
2022	Anne Terpstra	Lotte Koopmans	Denise Betsema
2023	Puck Pieterse	Anne Tauber	Sophie von Berswordt

=== Cross-country eliminator ===
Year	Winner	Second	Third
2016	Lizzy Witlox	Laura van Regenmortel	Annemarie Worst
2017	Anne Terpstra	Kiki van Asselt	Lizzy Witlox
2018	Lizzy Witlox	Hannah van Boven	Didi de Vries
2019	Didi de Vries	Larissa Hartog	Bibi Verzijl

=== Marathon ===
Year	Winner	Second	Third
2005	Bernadine Boog-Rouwerda	Elsbeth van Rooy-Vink	Saskia Elemans
2006	Elsbeth van Rooy-Vink	Laura Turpijn	Arielle Boek-Van Meurs
2007	Laura Turpijn	Arielle Boek-Van Meurs	Chantal Beltman
2008	Laura Turpijn	Arielle Boek-Van Meurs	Nicoletta de Jager
2010	Laura Turpijn	Mirre Stallen	Nicoletta de Jager
2011	Mirre Stallen	Laura Turpijn	Nicoletta de Jager
2012	Laura Turpijn	Hielke Elferink	Monique Zeldenrust
2014	Hielke Elferink	Jolien Janssen	Anne Terpstra
2015	Hielke Elferink	Annemiek van Vleuten	Karen Brouwer
2016	Hielke Elferink	Karen Brouwer	Pauliena Rooijakkers
2017	Annemiek van Vleuten	Hielke Elferink	Karen Brouwer
2018	Sophie von Berswordt	Laura van Regenmortel	Karen Brouwer
2019	Laura Van Regenmortel	Monique Zeldenrust	Senna Feron
2020	Cancelled because of Covid		
2021	Pauliena Rooijakkers	Rosa van Doorn	Teuntje Beekhuis
2022	Tessa Neefjes	Karen Brouwer	Rozanne Slik

=== Beach race ===
Year	Winner	Second	Third
2014	Pauliena Rooijakkers	Alieke Hoogenboom	Nina Kessler
2015 (Jan)	Pauliena Rooijakkers	Roxane Knetemann	Iris Slappendel
2015 (Dec)	Pauliena Rooijakkers	Nina Kessler	Esther Kortekaas
2017	Pauliena Rooijakkers	Alieke Hoogenboom	Céline van Houtum
2018	Pauliena Rooijakkers	Yvonne de Jong	Willemiek Meinders
2019	Natalie van Gogh	Esther van Veen	Femke Markus
2020	Natalie van Gogh	Nina Kessler	Tessa Neefjes
2021	Cancelled because of Covid		
2022	Nina Kessler	Tessa Neefjes	Marit Raaijmakers
2023	Nina Kessler	Tessa Neefjes	Mariëlle Trouwborst
