= Sebastian Fini Carstensen =

Danish cyclist (born 1995)

Sebastian Fini
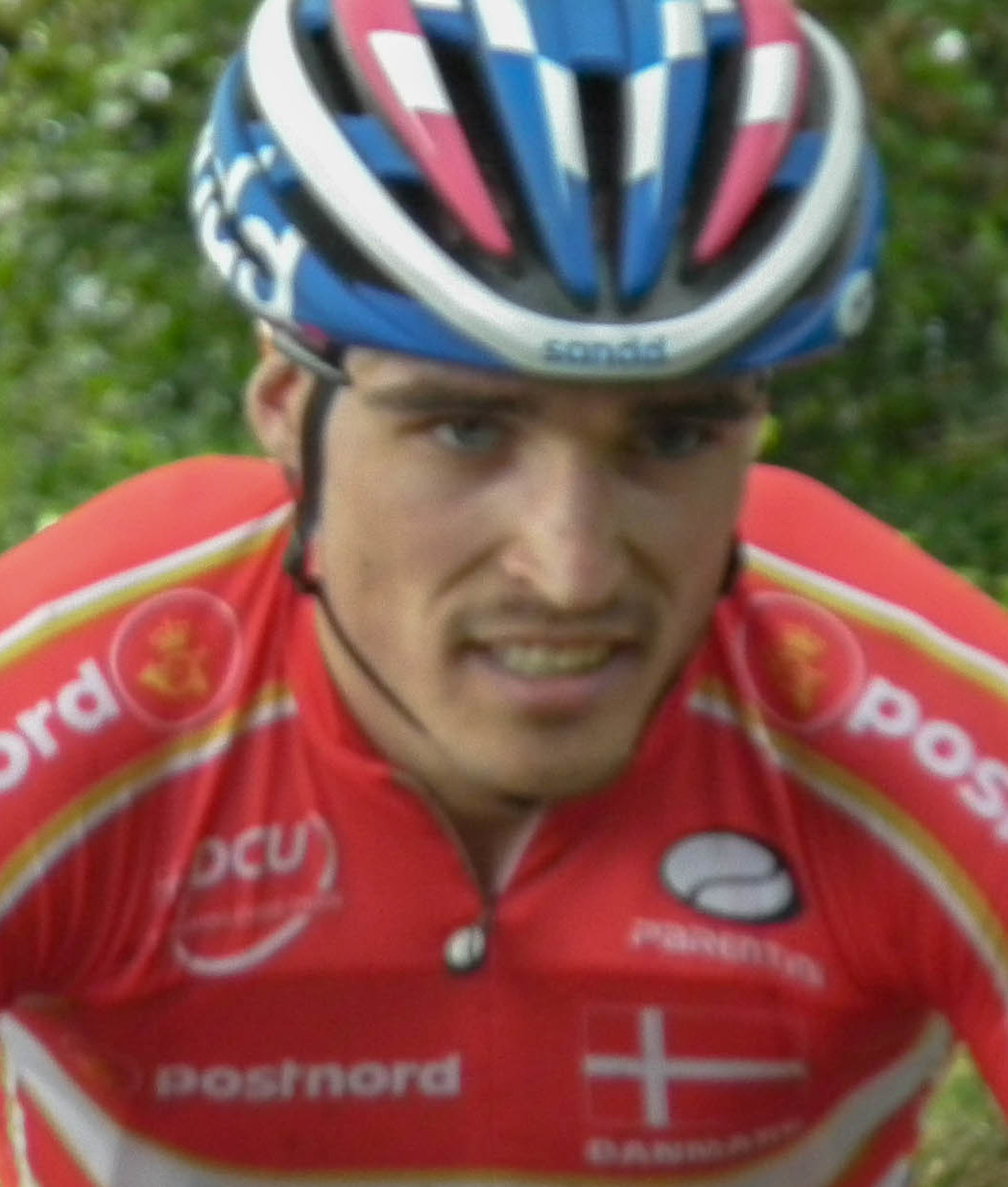

Personal information
- Full name: Sebastian Fini Juul
- Born: 26 March 1995 (age 31) Hellerup, Denmark
- Height: 1.74 m (5 ft 9 in)
- Weight: 69 kg (152 lb)

Cycling career
- Sport: Cycling
- Current team: CST PostNL Bafang (MTB); Airtox–Carl Ras (road)
- Disciplines: Mountain biking; Road; Cyclo-cross
- Role: Rider

Professional teams
- 2016–: CST Superior Brentjens (MTB)
- 2021–: Restaurant Suri–Carl Ras (road)
Medal record
Men's mountain bike racing
Representing Denmark
World Championships
Silver medal – second place	2015 Vallnord	Team relay
Silver medal – second place	2017 Cairns	Team relay
Bronze medal – third place	2018 Lenzerheide	Team relay
European Championships
Silver medal – second place	2017 Darfo Boario Terme	Team relay
Silver medal – second place	2021 Novi Sad	Cross-country
Silver medal – second place	2022 Munich	Cross-country
Bronze medal – third place	2019 Brno	Team relay

Sebastian Fini Juul (born Fini Carstensen 26 March 1995) is a Danish multi-discipline cyclist, who currently competes in cross-country cycling for UCI Elite MTB team CST PostNL Bafang, and in road cycling for UCI Continental team Airtox–Carl Ras. He competed at the 2018 UCI Mountain Bike World Championships, winning a bronze medal in the team relay.

== Major results ==
=== Mountain bike ===
2014
1st Cross-country, National Championships
2015
1st Cross-country, National Championships
2nd Team relay, UCI World Championships
2016
1st Cross-country, National Championships
2017
1st Cross-country, National Championships
2nd Team relay, UCI World Championships
2018
1st Cross-country, National Championships
3rd Team relay, UCI World Championships
2019
1st Cross-country, National Championships
2020
1st Marathon, National Championships
2021
2nd Cross-country, UEC European Championships
2022
1st Cross-country, National Championships
2nd Cross-country, UEC European Championships
UCI XCC World Cup

3rd Mont-Sainte-Anne

2023
1st Cross-country, National Championships
3rd Team relay, UCI World Championships
UCI XCC World Cup

3rd Lenzerheide

2024
National Championships

1st Cross-country
1st Short track

2nd Overall Cape Epic (with Nino Schurter)

=== Cyclo-cross ===
2017–2018
1st National Championships
2018–2019
1st National Championships
2019–2020
1st National Championships
2020–2021
1st National Championships
2022–2023
1st National Championships
