= Milan Vader =

Dutch cross-country mountain biker (born 1996)

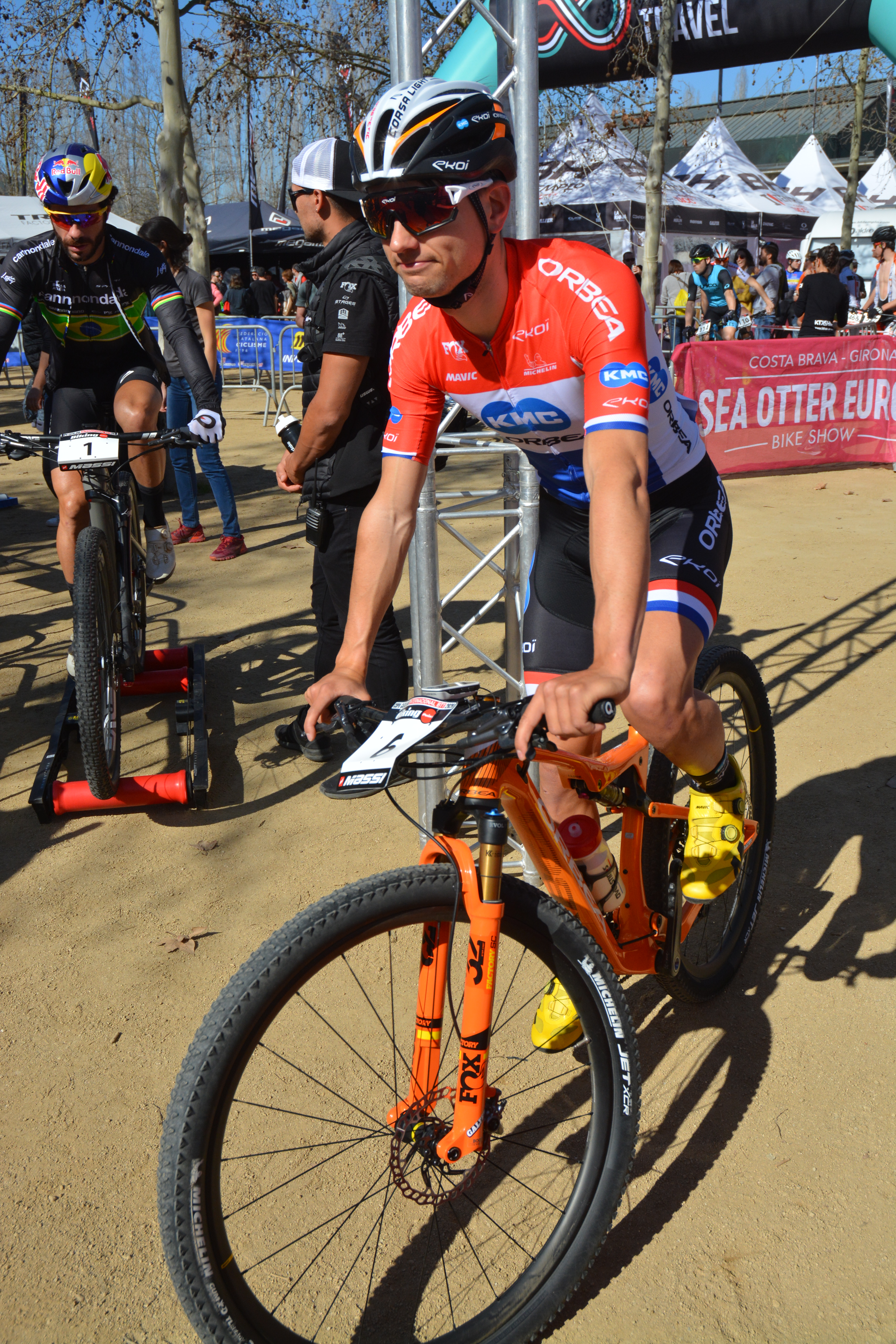

Personal information
- Born: 18 February 1996 (age 30) Middelburg, Netherlands
- Height: 1.73 m (5 ft 8 in)
- Weight: 63 kg (139 lb)

Cycling career
- Sport: Cycling
- Current team: Pinarello–Q36.5 Pro Cycling Team
- Disciplines: Cross-country; Road
- Role: Rider

Professional teams
- 2018: Habitat Mountain Bike Team
- 2019–2021: KMC–Ekoi–Orbea
- 2022–2024: Team Jumbo–Visma
- 2025–: Q36.5 Pro Cycling Team

Major wins
- Stage races Tour of Guangxi (2023)
Medal record
Representing Netherlands
Men's mountain bike racing
European Championships
| Bronze medal – third place | 2019 Brno | Cross-country |

Milan Vader (born 18 February 1996) is a Dutch cross-country mountain biker and road cyclist, who currently rides for UCI ProTeam Pinarello–Q36.5 Pro Cycling Team.

== Career ==
Vader originally competed in cross-country mountain biking, where he was a two time elite national champion and a bronze medalist at the 2019 European Championships. In 2020, he finished second overall at the Olympic Cross-country World Cup, before going on to place 10th in the cross-country race at the 2020 Summer Olympics.

In 2022, Vader joined Team Jumbo–Visma to focus on road racing.

On stage five of the 2022 Tour of the Basque Country, he suffered a terrible crash, having run into a guardrail during a descent, causing him to fall down a steep dropoff. He fractured his spine in 1 places, eight ribs as well as his shoulder, collarbone, eye socket, and cheekbone in addition to rupturing his carotid artery and perforating his lung. He was placed into an induced coma for 12 days. After five months, Vader returned to racing in September at the CRO Race.

Despite this setback, Vader returned to form, finishing third overall in the Okolo Slovenska in September 2023. A month later, he won the fourth stage of the Tour of Guangxi, his first professional road win, also taking the race lead in the process. He held onto the overall lead for the remainder of the race, winning the race by a margin of six seconds to Rémy Rochas.

== Major results ==
=== Mountain bike ===
2013
1st Cross-country, National Junior Championships
2014
2nd Cross-country, National Junior Championships
3rd Cross-country, UEC European Junior Championships
UCI Junior XCO World Cup

3rd Nové Město

4th Cross-country, UCI World Junior Championships
2015
1st Cross-country, National Under-23 Championships
2016
1st Cross-country, National Under-23 Championships
2017
5th Cross-country, UCI World Under-23 Championships
2019
1st Cross-country, National Championships
3rd Cross-country, UEC European Championships
2020
1st Cross-country, National Championships
French Cup

1st Alpe d'Huez

UCI XCO World Cup

2nd Nové Město II
3rd Nové Město I

Copa Catalana Internacional

2nd Barcelona

2021
UCI XCC World Cup

3rd Leogang

Internazionali d’Italia Series

3rd Andora

=== Road ===
2023 (2 pro wins)
1st Overall Tour of Guangxi

1st Stage 4

3rd Overall Okolo Slovenska

1st Mountains classification

2025
10th Muur Classic Geraardsbergen

==== Grand Tour general classification results timeline ====
| Grand Tour | 2025 |
|---|---|
| Giro d'Italia | 80 |
| Tour de France | — |
| Vuelta a España | — |

Legend
| — | Did not compete |
| DNF | Did not finish |
