= 2023 Tour of Guangxi =

2023 UCI World Tour, race 35 of 35

Race details
- Dates: 12–17 October 2023
- Stages: 6
- Distance: 958.8 km (595.8 mi)

Results
Jersey awarded to the overall winner	Winner	Milan Vader (NED)	(Team Jumbo–Visma)
	Second	Rémy Rochas (FRA)	(Cofidis)
	Third	Ethan Hayter (GBR)	(INEOS Grenadiers)
Jersey awarded to the points classification winner	Points	Dries De Bondt (BEL)	(Alpecin–Deceuninck)
Jersey awarded to the mountains classification winner	Mountains	Frederik Wandahl (DEN)	(Bora–Hansgrohe)
Jersey awarded to the young rider classification winner	Young rider	Ethan Hayter (GBR)	(INEOS Grenadiers)
	Team	(France) Cofidis	

The 2023 Gree-Tour of Guangxi was a road cycling stage race that took place between 12 and 17 October 2023 in the Chinese province of Guangxi. It was the 4th edition of the Tour of Guangxi and the thirty-fifth and final event of the 2023 UCI World Tour. The race returned after three years of not being held due to the COVID-19 pandemic in China.

== Teams ==
Eighteen teams, which consist of fourteen of the eighteen UCI WorldTour teams, three UCI Professional Continental teams and one national team participated in the race. Each team entered seven riders, except Israel–Premier Tech, Intermarché–Circus–Wanty, Tudor Pro Cycling Team which entered six riders and Team Jumbo–Visma, Trek–Segafredo which entered five riders.

Two riders of Intermarché–Circus–Wanty were pulled from the race before the start by their team. Madis Mihkels and Gerben Thijssen both are facing disciplinary action after Mihkels posted a picture on instagram of himself imitating slant eyes.

UCI WorldTeams

- Alpecin–Deceuninck
- Arkéa–Samsic
- Bora–Hansgrohe
- Cofidis
- EF Education–EasyPost
- Groupama–FDJ
- Intermarché–Circus–Wanty
- Lidl–Trek
- Movistar Team
- Team Bahrain Victorious
- Team Jayco–AlUla
- Team dsm–firmenich
- Team Jumbo–Visma
- UAE Team Emirates

UCI ProTeams

- Israel–Premier Tech
- Lotto–Dstny
- Tudor Pro Cycling Team

National teams

- China

== Pre-race favorites ==
The race has typically favored sprinters or punchers for the overall victory. This edition will be no different with Stage 4 likely to be the decisive stage. Tim Wellens is the only past winner of the Tour starting, he won in 2017 after winning a two-up sprint at Mashan Nongla Scenic Spot, the same place stage 4 finishes this year. Other riders considered favorites are punchers Matteo Jorgenson and Ivan Sosa (Both Movistar Team) and Oscar Onley (Team dsm–firmenich).

With the other stages most likely to end in a mass sprint the favorites for those stages are: Arnaud De Lie (Lotto–Dstny) who has amassed 10 pro wins this season and Olav Kooij (Team Jumbo–Visma) who has 11. Other contenders for the sprint stages are; Jonathan Milan (Team Bahrain Victorious), Arvid de Kleijn (Tudor Pro Cycling Team), Jakub Mareczko (Alpecin–Deceuninck), Max Kanter (Movistar Team) and Elia Viviani (INEOS Grenadiers).

== Route ==
Stage characteristics and winners
Stage	Date	Course	Distance	Type	Stage winner
1	12 October	Beihai to Beihai	135.6 km (84.3 mi)	Flat stage	Elia Viviani (ITA)
2	13 October	Beihai to Qinzhou	149.6 km (93.0 mi)	Flat stage	Jonathan Milan (ITA)
3	14 October	Nanning to Nanning	134.3 km (83.5 mi)	Hilly stage	Olav Kooij (NED)
4	15 October	Nanning to Mashan Nongla Scenic Spot	161.4 km (100.3 mi)	Medium mountain stage	Milan Vader (NED)
5	16 October	Liuzhou to Guilin	209.6 km (130.2 mi)	Hilly stage	Juan Sebastián Molano (COL)
6	17 October	Guilin to Guilin	168.3 km (104.6 mi)	Hilly stage	Olav Kooij (NED)
Total			958.8 km (595.8 mi)		

== Stages ==
=== Stage 1 ===
12 October 2023 — Beihai to Beihai, 135.6 km (84.3 mi)

The opening stage of the Tour of Guangxi was a flat circuit stage starting and finishing in Beihai. A breakaway of five riders; Frederik Wandahl (Bora–Hansgrohe), Louis Barré (Arkéa–Samsic), Dries De Bondt (Alpecin–Deceuninck), Omer Goldstein (Israel–Premier Tech) and Julius Johansen (Intermarché–Circus–Wanty), got away early on. They were not allowed too large of a gap by the teams of the sprinters. Wandahl won both of the Mountain sprints to take the jersey for leading that classification going into the second stage.

With Thomas De Gendt and his Lotto–Dstny team doing the pacing the break was caught with just under 16km to go. Lotto–Dstny, Cofidis, Movistar Team and Bora–Hansgrohe all had their trains at the front coming into the sprint. It was Milan who launched first, with Viviani coming around in the last few hundred metres to take victory. This was Viviani's first WorldTour win since 2019 where he won the 2019 EuroEyes Cyclassics.

Stage 1 result
Rank	Rider	Team	Time
1	Elia Viviani (ITA)	INEOS Grenadiers	3h 01' 56"
2	Jonathan Milan (ITA)	Team Bahrain Victorious	+ 0"
3	Sam Bennett (IRL)	Bora–Hansgrohe	+ 0"
4	Arnaud de Lie (BEL)	Lotto–Dstny	+ 0"
5	Olav Kooij (NED)	Team Jumbo–Visma	+ 0"
6	Lionel Taminiaux (BEL)	Alpecin–Deceuninck	+ 0"
7	Max Walscheid (GER)	Cofidis	+ 0"
8	Arvid de Kleijn (NED)	Tudor Pro Cycling Team	+ 0"
9	Jensen Plowright (AUS)	Alpecin–Deceuninck	+ 0"
10	Jon Aberasturi (ESP)	Lidl–Trek	+ 0"

General classification after Stage 1
Rank	Rider	Team	Time
1	Elia Viviani (ITA)	INEOS Grenadiers	3h 01' 46"
2	Jonathan Milan (ITA)	Team Bahrain Victorious	+ 4"
3	Dries De Bondt (BEL)	Alpecin–Deceuninck	+ 4"
4	Sam Bennett (IRL)	Bora–Hansgrohe	+ 6"
5	Omer Goldstein (ISR)	Israel–Premier Tech	+ 7"
6	Frederik Wandahl (DEN)	Bora–Hansgrohe	+ 8"
7	Louis Barré (FRA)	Arkéa–Samsic	+ 9"
8	Arnaud de Lie (BEL)	Lotto–Dstny	+ 10"
9	Olav Kooij (NED)	Team Jumbo–Visma	+ 10"
10	Lionel Taminiaux (BEL)	Alpecin–Deceuninck	+ 10"

=== Stage 2 ===
13 October 2023 — Beihai to Qinzhou, 149.6 km (93.0 mi)

Stage 2 result
Rank	Rider	Team	Time
1	Jonathan Milan (ITA)	Team Bahrain Victorious	3h 15' 53"
2	Arvid de Kleijn (NED)	Tudor Pro Cycling Team	+ 0"
3	Juan Sebastián Molano (COL)	UAE Team Emirates	+ 0"
4	Max Kanter (GER)	Movistar Team	+ 0"
5	Jhonatan Narváez (ECU)	INEOS Grenadiers	+ 0"
6	Sam Bennett (IRL)	Bora–Hansgrohe	+ 0"
7	Olav Kooij (NED)	Team Jumbo–Visma	+ 0"
8	Ma Binyan (CHN)	China	+ 0"
9	Rüdiger Selig (GER)	Lotto–Dstny	+ 0"
10	Arnaud de Lie (BEL)	Lotto–Dstny	+ 0"

General classification after Stage 2
Rank	Rider	Team	Time
1	Jonathan Milan (ITA)	Team Bahrain Victorious	6h 17' 33"
2	Dries De Bondt (BEL)	Alpecin–Deceuninck	+ 4"
3	Elia Viviani (ITA)	INEOS Grenadiers	+ 6"
4	Arvid de Kleijn (NED)	Tudor Pro Cycling Team	+ 10"
5	Sam Bennett (IRL)	Bora–Hansgrohe	+ 12"
6	Juan Sebastián Molano (COL)	UAE Team Emirates	+ 12"
7	Jens Reynders (BEL)	Israel–Premier Tech	+ 13"
8	Omer Goldstein (ISR)	Israel–Premier Tech	+ 13"
9	Thomas Champion (FRA)	Cofidis	+ 13"
10	Frederik Wandahl (DEN)	Bora–Hansgrohe	+ 14"

=== Stage 3 ===
14 October 2023 — Nanning to Nanning, 134.3 km (83.5 mi)

Stage 3 result
Rank	Rider	Team	Time
1	Olav Kooij (NED)	Team Jumbo–Visma	3h 04' 09"
2	Rick Pluimers (NED)	Tudor Pro Cycling Team	+ 0"
3	Marijn van den Berg (NED)	EF Education–EasyPost	+ 0"
4	Tobias Lund Andresen (DEN)	Team dsm–firmenich	+ 0"
5	Lionel Taminiaux (BEL)	Alpecin–Deceuninck	+ 0"
6	Axel Mariault (FRA)	Cofidis	+ 0"
7	Laurenz Rex (BEL)	Intermarché–Circus–Wanty	+ 0"
8	Ethan Hayter (GBR)	INEOS Grenadiers	+ 0"
9	Jonathan Milan (ITA)	Team Bahrain Victorious	+ 0"
10	Johan Jacobs (SUI)	Movistar Team	+ 0"

General classification after Stage 3
Rank	Rider	Team	Time
1	Dries De Bondt (BEL)	Alpecin–Deceuninck	9h 21' 40"
2	Jonathan Milan (ITA)	Team Bahrain Victorious	+ 2"
3	Olav Kooij (NED)	Team Jumbo–Visma	+ 8"
4	Rick Pluimers (NED)	Tudor Pro Cycling Team	+ 12"
5	Marijn van den Berg (NED)	EF Education–EasyPost	+ 14"
6	Juan Sebastián Molano (COL)	UAE Team Emirates	+ 14"
7	Omer Goldstein (ISR)	Israel–Premier Tech	+ 15"
8	Thomas Champion (FRA)	Cofidis	+ 15"
9	Frederik Wandahl (DEN)	Bora–Hansgrohe	+ 15"
10	Louis Barré (FRA)	Arkéa–Samsic	+ 17"

=== Stage 4 ===
15 October 2023 — Nanning to Mashan Nongla Scenic Spot, 161.4 km (100.3 mi)

Stage 4 result
Rank	Rider	Team	Time
1	Milan Vader (NED)	Team Jumbo–Visma	3h 43' 45"
2	Rémy Rochas (FRA)	Cofidis	+ 2"
3	Hugh Carthy (GBR)	EF Education–EasyPost	+ 8"
4	Jesús David Peña (COL)	Team Jayco–AlUla	+ 8"
5	Felix Großschartner (AUT)	UAE Team Emirates	+ 8"
6	Sylvain Moniquet (BEL)	Lotto–Dstny	+ 8"
7	Tim Wellens (BEL)	UAE Team Emirates	+ 8"
8	Matteo Jorgenson (USA)	Movistar Team	+ 8"
9	Louis Barré (FRA)	Arkéa–Samsic	+ 8"
10	Ethan Hayter (GBR)	INEOS Grenadiers	+ 8"

General classification after Stage 4
Rank	Rider	Team	Time
1	Milan Vader (NED)	Team Jumbo–Visma	13h 05' 33"
2	Rémy Rochas (FRA)	Cofidis	+ 6"
3	Hugh Carthy (GBR)	EF Education–EasyPost	+ 14"
4	Louis Barré (FRA)	Arkéa–Samsic	+ 17"
5	Matteo Jorgenson (USA)	Movistar Team	+ 18"
6	Ethan Hayter (GBR)	INEOS Grenadiers	+ 18"
7	Felix Großschartner (AUT)	UAE Team Emirates	+ 18"
8	Jesús David Peña (COL)	Team Jayco–AlUla	+ 18"
9	Tim Wellens (BEL)	UAE Team Emirates	+ 18"
10	Sylvain Moniquet (BEL)	Lotto–Dstny	+ 18"

=== Stage 5 ===
16 October 2023 — Liuzhou to Guilin, 209.6 km (130.2 mi)

Stage 5 result
Rank	Rider	Team	Time
1	Juan Sebastián Molano (COL)	UAE Team Emirates	4h 36' 54"
2	Olav Kooij (NED)	Team Jumbo–Visma	+ 0"
3	Tobias Lund Andresen (DEN)	Team dsm–firmenich	+ 0"
4	Jonathan Milan (ITA)	Team Bahrain Victorious	+ 0"
5	Arvid De Kleijn (NED)	Tudor Pro Cycling Team	+ 0"
6	Jon Aberasturi (ESP)	Lidl–Trek	+ 0"
7	Max Kanter (GER)	Movistar Team	+ 0"
8	Elia Viviani (ITA)	INEOS Grenadiers	+ 0"
9	Blake Quick (AUS)	Team Jayco–AlUla	+ 0"
10	Laurenz Rex (BEL)	Intermarché–Circus–Wanty	+ 0"

General classification after Stage 5
Rank	Rider	Team	Time
1	Milan Vader (NED)	Team Jumbo–Visma	17h 42' 27"
2	Rémy Rochas (FRA)	Cofidis	+ 6"
3	Hugh Carthy (GBR)	EF Education–EasyPost	+ 14"
4	Tim Wellens (BEL)	UAE Team Emirates	+ 16"
5	Louis Barré (FRA)	Arkéa–Samsic	+ 17"
6	Matteo Jorgenson (USA)	Movistar Team	+ 18"
7	Ethan Hayter (GBR)	INEOS Grenadiers	+ 18"
9	Felix Großschartner (AUT)	UAE Team Emirates	+ 18"
8	Jesús David Peña (COL)	Team Jayco–AlUla	+ 18"
10	Sylvain Moniquet (BEL)	Lotto–Dstny	+ 18"

=== Stage 6 ===
17 October 2023 — Guilin to Guilin, 168.3 km (104.6 mi)

Stage 6 result
Rank	Rider	Team	Time
1	Olav Kooij (NED)	Team Jumbo–Visma	3h 34' 50"
2	Juan Sebastián Molano (COL)	UAE Team Emirates	+ 0"
3	Ethan Hayter (GBR)	INEOS Grenadiers	+ 0"
4	Arvid De Kleijn (NED)	Tudor Pro Cycling Team	+ 0"
5	Dušan Rajović (SRB)	Team Bahrain Victorious	+ 0"
6	Elia Viviani (ITA)	INEOS Grenadiers	+ 0"
7	Arnaud De Lie (BEL)	Lotto–Dstny	+ 0"
8	Max Kanter (GER)	Movistar Team	+ 0"
9	Rüdiger Selig (GER)	Lotto–Dstny	+ 0"
10	Max Walscheid (GER)	Cofidis	+ 0"

General classification after Stage 6
Rank	Rider	Team	Time
1	Milan Vader (NED)	Team Jumbo–Visma	21h 17' 17"
2	Rémy Rochas (FRA)	Cofidis	+ 6"
3	Ethan Hayter (GBR)	INEOS Grenadiers	+ 11"
4	Hugh Carthy (GBR)	EF Education–EasyPost	+ 14"
5	Tim Wellens (BEL)	UAE Team Emirates	+ 16"
6	Louis Barré (FRA)	Arkéa–Samsic	+ 17"
7	Matteo Jorgenson (USA)	Movistar Team	+ 18"
8	Jesús David Peña (COL)	Team Jayco–AlUla	+ 18"
9	Felix Großschartner (AUT)	UAE Team Emirates	+ 18"
10	Sylvain Moniquet (BEL)	Lotto–Dstny	+ 18"

== Classification leadership ==
Classification leadership by stage
Stage	Winner	General classification	Points classification	Mountains classification	Young rider classification	Team classification
1	Elia Viviani	Elia Viviani	Elia Viviani	Frederik Wandahl	Jonathan Milan	Alpecin–Deceuninck
2	Jonathan Milan	Jonathan Milan	Jonathan Milan	Frederik Wandahl	Jonathan Milan	INEOS Grenadiers
3	Olav Kooij	Dries De Bondt	Dries De Bondt	Frederik Wandahl	Jonathan Milan	INEOS Grenadiers
4	Milan Vader	Milan Vader	Dries De Bondt	Frederik Wandahl	Louis Barré	Cofidis
5	Juan Sebastián Molano	Milan Vader	Dries De Bondt	Frederik Wandahl	Louis Barré	Cofidis
6	Olav Kooij	Milan Vader	Dries De Bondt	Frederik Wandahl	Ethan Hayter	Cofidis
Final		Milan Vader	Dries De Bondt	Frederik Wandahl	Ethan Hayter	Cofidis

== Classification standings ==
Legend
General classification	Denotes the winner of the general classification	Mountain classification	Denotes the winner of the mountains classification
Points classification	Denotes the winner of the points classification	Young rider classification	Denotes the winner of the Young rider classification

=== General classification ===
Final general classification (1–10)
Rank	Rider	Team	Time
1	Milan Vader (NED)	Team Jumbo–Visma	21h 17' 17"
2	Rémy Rochas (FRA)	Cofidis	+ 6"
3	Ethan Hayter (GBR)	INEOS Grenadiers	+ 11"
4	Hugh Carthy (GBR)	EF Education–EasyPost	+ 14"
5	Tim Wellens (BEL)	UAE Team Emirates	+ 16"
6	Louis Barré (FRA)	Arkéa–Samsic	+ 17"
7	Matteo Jorgenson (USA)	Movistar Team	+ 18"
8	Jesús David Peña (COL)	Team Jayco–AlUla	+ 18"
9	Felix Großschartner (AUT)	UAE Team Emirates	+ 18"
10	Sylvain Moniquet (BEL)	Lotto–Dstny	+ 18"

=== Points classification ===
Final points classification (1–10)
Rank	Rider	Team	Points
1	Dries De Bondt (BEL)	Alpecin–Deceuninck	58
2	Olav Kooij (NED)	Team Jumbo–Visma	50
3	Jonathan Milan (ITA)	Team Bahrain Victorious	34
4	Jens Reynders (BEL)	Israel–Premier Tech	30
5	Juan Sebastián Molano (COL)	UAE Team Emirates	29
6	Arvid de Kleijn (NED)	Tudor Pro Cycling Team	26
7	Elia Viviani (ITA)	INEOS Grenadiers	23
8	Jensen Plowright (AUS)	Alpecin–Deceuninck	20
9	Ethan Hayter (GBR)	INEOS Grenadiers	18
10	Max Kanter (GER)	Movistar Team	16

=== Mountains classification ===
Final mountains classification (1–10)
Rank	Rider	Team	Points
1	Frederik Wandahl (DEN)	Bora–Hansgrohe	73
2	Dries De Bondt (BEL)	Alpecin–Deceuninck	29
3	Ryan Mullen (IRL)	Bora–Hansgrohe	21
4	Juri Hollmann (GER)	Movistar Team	20
5	Tim Wellens (BEL)	UAE Team Emirates	15
6	Johan Jacobs (SUI)	Movistar Team	15
7	Felix Großschartner (AUT)	UAE Team Emirates	12
8	Óscar Rodríguez (ESP)	Movistar Team	10
9	Jens Reynders (BEL)	Israel–Premier Tech	9
10	Matteo Jorgenson (USA)	Movistar Team	6

=== Young rider classification ===
Final young rider classification (1–10)
Rank	Rider	Team	Time
1	Ethan Hayter (GBR)	INEOS Grenadiers	21h 17' 28"
2	Louis Barré (FRA)	Arkéa–Samsic	+ 6"
3	Matteo Jorgenson (USA)	Movistar Team	+ 7"
4	Jesús David Peña (COL)	Team Jayco–AlUla	+ 7"
5	Sylvain Moniquet (BEL)	Lotto–Dstny	+ 7"
6	Oscar Onley (GBR)	Team dsm–firmenich	+ 10"
7	Axel Mariault (FRA)	Cofidis	+ 15"
8	Giovanni Aleotti (ITA)	Bora–Hansgrohe	+ 18"
9	Leo Hayter (GBR)	INEOS Grenadiers	+ 18"
10	Filippo Baroncini (ITA)	Lidl–Trek	+ 26"

=== Team classification ===
Final team classification (1–10)
Rank	Team	Time
1	(France) Cofidis	63h 52' 55"
2	(United Kingdom) INEOS Grenadiers	+ 16"
3	(United States) EF Education–EasyPost	+ 33"
4	(United Arab Emirates) UAE Team Emirates	+ 1' 22"
5	(France) Arkéa–Samsic	+ 1' 50"
6	(Spain) Movistar Team	+ 1' 52"
7	(Germany) Bora–Hansgrohe	+ 2' 46"
8	(Australia) Team Jayco–AlUla	+ 2' 55"
9	Israel–Premier Tech	+ 2' 57"
10	(Belgium) Lotto–Dstny	+ 4' 26"
