= Haraldseth =

Haraldseth is a Norwegian surname. Notable people with the surname include:

- Fredrik Haraldseth (born 1992), Norwegian cyclo-cross cyclist
- Leif Haraldseth (1929–2019), Norwegian trade unionist and politician
