= 2014 UCI Mountain Bike & Trials World Championships – Men's under-23 cross-country =

== Results ==
| # | Cyclist | Nation | | Time |
|---|---|---|---|---|
| 1 | Michiel van der Heijden | Netherlands | in | 1 h 18 min 40 s |
| 2 | Jordan Sarrou | France | | 1 h 19 min 29 s |
| 3 | Howard Grotts | United States | | 1 h 19 min 52 s |
| 4 | Jan Vastl | Czech Republic | | 1 h 20 min 08 s |
| 5 | Grant Ferguson | United Kingdom | | 1 h 20 min 19 s |
| 6 | Anton Cooper | New Zealand | | 1 h 20 min 36 s |
| 7 | Julian Schelb | Germany | | 1 h 21 min 08 s |
| 8 | Leandre Bouchard | Canada | | 1 h 21 min 15 s |
| 9 | Andri Frischknecht | Switzerland | | 1 h 21 min 36 s |
| 10 | James Reid | South Africa | | 1 h 21 min 56 s |
| 11 | Gregor Raggl | Austria | | 1 h 22 min 01 s |
| 12 | Titouan Carod | France | | 1 h 22 min 04 s |
| 13 | Sondre Kristiansen | Norway | | 1 h 22 min 46 s |
| 14 | Pablo Rodriguez Guede | Spain | | 1 h 22 min 55 s |
| 15 | Tomas Paprstka | Czech Republic | | 1 h 22 min 56 s |
| 16 | Kevin Panhuyzen | Belgium | | 1 h 23 min 17 s |
| 17 | Georg Egger | Germany | | 1 h 23 min 37 s |
| 18 | Cameron Ivory | Australia | | 1 h 23 min 57 s |
| 19 | Arnis Petersons | Latvia | | 1 h 24 min 09 s |
| 20 | Victor Koretzky | France | | 1 h 24 min 18 s |
| 21 | Luiz Cocuzzi | Brazil | | 1 h 24 min 22 s |
| 22 | Axel Lindh | Sweden | | 1 h 24 min 28 s |
| 23 | Lars Förster | Switzerland | | 1 h 24 min 47 s |
| 24 | Fabian Paumann | Switzerland | | 1 h 24 min 56 s |
| 25 | Martin Frey | Germany | | 1 h 25 min 11 s |
| 26 | Didier Bats | Belgium | | 1 h 25 min 29 s |
| 27 | Florian Chenaux | Switzerland | | 1 h 25 min 47 s |
| 28 | Maximilian Vieider | Italy | | 1 h 26 min 07 s |
| 29 | Gioele Bertolini | Italy | | 1 h 26 min 20 s |
| 30 | Raphael Gay | France | | 1 h 26 min 29 s |
| 31 | Mitchell Bailey | Canada | | 1 h 26 min 49 s |
| 32 | Oleksiy Zavolokin | Ukraine | | 1 h 26 min 51 s |
| 33 | Julien Trarieux | France | | 1 h 26 min 58 s |
| 34 | Louis Bendixen | Denmark | | 1 h 26 min 58 s |
| 35 | Lorenzo Samparisi | Italy | | 1 h 27 min 05 s |
| 36 | Sepp Kuss | United States | | 1 h 27 min 11 s |
| 37 | Jeff Luyten | Belgium | | 1 h 27 min 27 s |
| 38 | Peter Disera | Canada | | 1 h 27 min 51 s |
| 39 | Andrin Beeli | Switzerland | | 1 h 27 min 59 s |
| 40 | Scott Bowden | Australia | | 1 h 28 min 14 s |
| 41 | José Pedro Dias | Portugal | | 1 h 28 min 23 s |
| 42 | Frantisek Lami | Slovakia | | 1 h 28 min 35 s |
| 43 | Bart De Vocht | Belgium | | 1 h 28 min 39 s |
| 44 | Marcel Guerrini | Switzerland | | 1 h 28 min 53 s |
| 45 | Andrea Righettini | Italy | | 1 h 29 min 01 s |
| 46 | Martins Blums | Latvia | | 1 h 29 min 05 s |
| 47 | Iain Paton | United Kingdom | | 1 h 29 min 25 s |
| 48 | Gregor Krajnc | Slovenia | | 1 h 29 min 31 s |
| 49 | Chris Hamilton | Australia | | 1 h 29 min 40 s |
| 50 | Gert Heyns | South Africa | | 1 h 30 min 18 s |
| 51 | Andrey Fonseca | Costa Rica | | 1 h 30 min 40 s |
| 52 | Pavel Skalicky | Czech Republic | | 1 h 31 min 32 s |
| 53 | Edvard Vea Iversen | Norway | | 1 h 31 min 56 s |
| 54 | Ole Hem | Norway | | 1 h 33 min 42 s |
| 55 | Gonçalo Duarte Amado | Portugal | | |
| 56 | Max Foidl | Austria | | |
| 57 | Christian Pfäffle | Germany | | |
| 58 | Keegan Swenson | United States | | |
| 59 | Stefano Valdrighi | Italy | | |
| 60 | Toki Sawada | Japan | | |
| 61 | Luis Rojas | Argentina | | |
| 62 | Sebastian Carstensen Fini | Denmark | | |
| 63 | Evan Mcneely | Canada | | |
| 64 | Nicolas Sessler | Brazil | | |
| 65 | José Aurelio Hernandez | Mexico | | |
| 66 | Ruslan Boredskiy | Russia | | |
| 67 | Eskil Evensen-Lie | Norway | | |
| 68 | Ben Forbes | Australia | | |
| 69 | Niels Rasmussen | Denmark | | |
| 70 | Yoshitaka Nakahara | Japan | | |
| 71 | Nazaerbieke Bieken | China | | |
| 72 | Artem Shevtsov | Ukraine | | |
| 73 | Guy Niv | Israel | | |
| 74 | Fredrik Haraldseth | Norway | | |
| 75 | Eivind Andreas Roed | Norway | | |
| 76 | Roman Vladykin | Russia | | |
| 77 | Peteris Janevics | Latvia | | |
| 78 | Brian Villa | Argentina | | |
| 79 | William Mokgopo | South Africa | | |
| 80 | Piotr Konwa | Poland | | |
| 81 | Artem Aleksndrov | Russia | | |
| 82 | Alperen Kir | Turkey | | |
| 83 | Henrik Fiskadal | Norway | | |
| 84 | Tomas Visnovsky | Slovakia | | |
| 85 | Isak Unal | Turkey | | |
| 86 | Anton Stepanov | Russia | | |
| 87 | Toni Tähti | Finland | | |
| 88 | Kohei Maeda | Japan | | |
| 89 | Alvaro Macias | Argentina | | |
| 90 | Adria Urcelay Tejedor | Andorra | | |
| 91 | Sergey Kovalchuk | Kazakhstan | | |
