= 2022 European Mountain Bike Championships =

- Venue: (Czech Republic) Jablonné v Podještědí (Slovenia) Maribor (Portugal) Anadia (Germany) Munich (France) Dunkirk
- Date: 19 June-11 December 2021
- Events: 12

The 2022 European Mountain Bike Championships was the 33rd edition of the European Mountain Bike Championships, an annual mountain biking competition organized by the Union Européenne de Cyclisme (UEC). Championships in 5 disciplines were held in 2022 for elite: downhill, cross-country cycling (XC), cross-country marathon (XCM), cross-country eliminator (XCE) and cross-country short circuit (XCC).

== Dates and venues ==
- (Czech Republic) Jablonné v Podještědí : 19 June (cross-country marathon)
- (Slovenia) Maribor : 23–25 June (downhill)
- (Portugal) Anadia : 30 June–3 July (cross-country eliminator, cross-country short circuit)
- (Germany) Munich : 19–20 August (cross-country)
- (France) Dunkirk: 11 December (beach race)

== Medal summary ==
=== Cross-country ===
Event	Gold		Silver		Bronze	
Men	Tom Pidcock; Great Britain	1:18:09	Sebastian Fini Carstensen; Denmark	1:18:20	Filippo Colombo; Switzerland	1:18:21
Women	Loana Lecomte; France	1:28:04	Pauline Ferrand-Prévot; France	1:28:41	Anne Terpstra; Netherlands	1:31:12

=== Cross-country eliminator ===
Event	Gold	Silver	Bronze
Men	Jakob Klemenčič; Slovenia	Ricardo Marinheiro; Portugal	Ede-Károly Molnár; Romania
Women	Gaia Tormena; Italy	Terézia Ciriaková; Slovakia	Zuzana Šafářová; Czech Republic

=== Cross-country marathon ===
Event	Gold		Silver		Bronze	
Men	Fabian Rabensteiner; Italy	3:53:30.0	Krzysztof Łukasik; Poland	3:53:59.5	Jaroslav Kulhavý; Czech Republic	3:55:50.0
Women	Natalia Fischer; Spain	4:09:07.0	Janina Wüst; Switzerland	4:14:06.6	Claudia Peretti; Italy	4:16:51.1

=== Cross-country short circuit ===
Event	Gold		Silver		Bronze	
Men	Charlie Aldridge; Great Britain	29:48.517	David Campos; Spain	30:04.828	Alexandre Balmer; Switzerland	30:10.640
Women	Ronja Blöchlinger; Switzerland	28:42.027	Giorgia Marchet; Italy	28:55.876	Linn Gustafzzon; Sweden	29:01.501

=== Downhill ===
Event	Gold		Silver		Bronze	
Men	Andreas Kolb; Austria	3:03.33	David Trummer; Austria	3:03.94	Benoît Coulanges; France	3:04.50
Women	Monika Hrastnik; Slovenia	3:29.71	Camille Balanche; Switzerland	3:32.72	Veronika Widmann; Italy	3:37.44

=== Beachrace ===
Event	Gold		Silver		Bronze	
Men	(Netherlands) Coen Vermeltfoort	1:27:40	(Belgium) Timothy Dupont	1:27:41	(France) Samuel Leroux	1:27:42
Women	(Netherlands) Tessa Neefjes	1:38:35	(Netherlands) Nina Kessler	1:38:39	(Belgium) Veronique Florizoone	1:43:01

== Medal table ==
Rank	Nation	Gold	Silver	Bronze	Total
1	Italy (ITA)	2	1	2	5
2	Netherlands (NED)	2	1	1	4
3	Great Britain (GBR)	2	0	0	2
3	Slovenia (SLO)	2	0	0	2
5	Switzerland (SUI)	1	2	2	5
6	France (FRA)	1	1	2	4
7	Austria (AUT)	1	1	0	2
7	Spain (ESP)	1	1	0	2
9	Belgium (BEL)	0	1	1	2
10	Denmark (DEN)	0	1	0	1
10	Poland (POL)	0	1	0	1
10	Portugal (POR)	0	1	0	1
10	Slovakia (SVK)	0	1	0	1
14	Czech Republic (CZE)	0	0	2	2
15	Romania (ROU)	0	0	1	1
15	Sweden (SWE)	0	0	1	1
Totals (16 entries)		12	12	12	36
