= Anne Tauber =

Dutch cross-country mountain biker (born 1995)

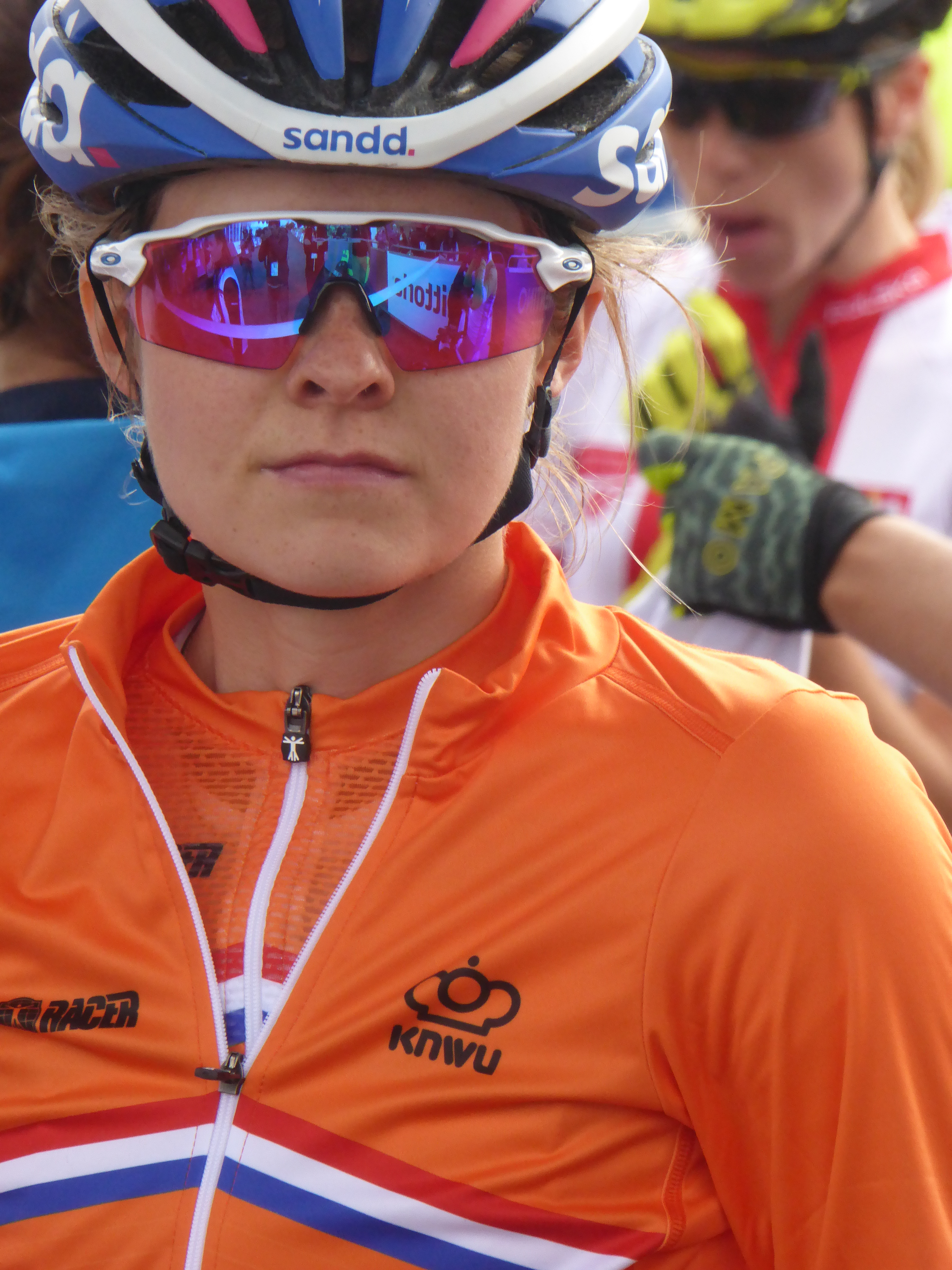
- Tauber in 2018

Personal information
- Born: 19 May 1995 (age 31) Oranjewoud, Netherlands

Cycling career
- Sport: Cycling
- Current team: KTM Factory MTB Team
- Discipline: Cross-country
- Role: Rider

Professional teams
- 2016–2017: Habitat Mountainbike Team
- 2018–2022: CST Sandd American Eagle MTB Racing Team
- 2023–2024: Orbea Factory Team
- 2025–: KTM Factory MTB Team
Medal record
Representing Netherlands
Women's mountain bike racing

Anne Tauber (born 19 May 1995) is a Dutch cross-country mountain biker and marathon speed skater, who rides for UCI mountain bike team KTM Factory MTB Team, and skates for Van Ramshorst / Blue Dune.

She qualified to represent the Netherlands at the 2020 Olympics along with fellow cyclist Anne Terpstra. In 2018 Tauber won the 200-kilometer long Alternative Elfstedentocht speed skating marathon classic on the Austrian Weissensee.

== Major results ==
2016
3rd Overall UCI Under-23 World Cup
3rd Cross-country, National Championships
2017
1st Cross-country, National Championships
3rd Cross-country, UEC European Under-23 Championships
2019
1st Cross-country, National Championships
2020
2nd Cross-country, National Championships
2021
3rd Cross-country, UEC European Championships
2022
Swiss Bike Cup

3rd Gstaad

2023
1st Sittard
XCO French Cup

2nd Marseille–Luminy

2nd Cross-country, National Championships
2024
UCI XCC World Cup

3rd Crans-Montana
