= Anne Terpstra =

Dutch cross-country mountain biker (born 1991)

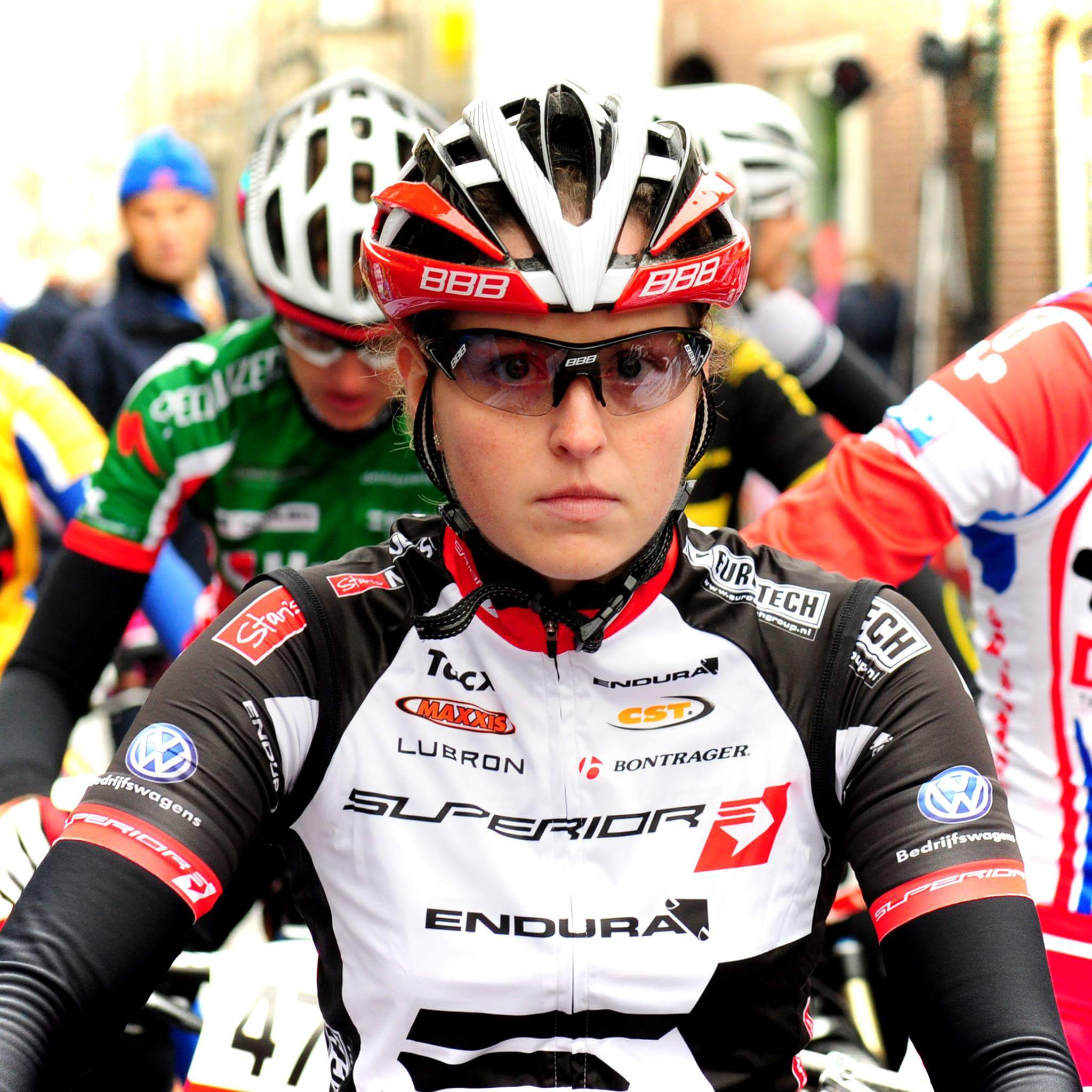

Personal information
- Born: 5 January 1991 (age 35) Zierikzee, Netherlands

Cycling career
- Sport: Cycling
- Discipline: Cross-country
- Role: Rider

Major wins
- Mountain bike National XC Championships (2018, 2020, 2022) XC World Cup 2 individual wins (2019, 2022) Cape Epic (2024)
Medal record
Representing Netherlands
World Championships
Silver medal – second place	2024 Vallnord	Cross country
Women's mountain bike racing
Silver medal – second place	2020 Monteceneri	Cross-country
Silver medal – second place	2021 Novi Sad	Cross-country
Bronze medal – third place	2022 Munich	Cross-country

Anne Terpstra (born 5 January 1991 in Zierikzee) is a Dutch cross-country cyclist. She is the silver medalist of 2024 World mountain bike championships in Cross-country Olympic.

She placed 15th in the women's cross-country race at the 2016 Summer Olympics. She was on the start list of 2018 Cross-Country European Championships and was not allowed to finish.

In 2019, during the Mountain Bike World Cup in Andorra, she won her first World Cup by beating Jolanda Neff in the final lap. Terpstra is the first Dutch female athlete to win a World Cup. During the 2019 UCI World Cup finals In Snowshoe, USA, she became 2nd and secured a 4th in the overall.

In September 2019 she was leading the UCI World ranking for the first time.

She has no relation to fellow Dutch cyclist, Niki Terpstra.

== Major results ==
2018
1st Cross-country, National Championships
2019
3rd Tokyo 2020 Test Event
4th Overall UCI XCO World Cup

1st Vallnord
2nd Lenzerheide
2nd Snowshoe
5th Albstadt

4th Cross-country, UCI World Championships
4th Cross-country, UEC European Championships
2020
1st Cross-country, National Championships
2nd Cross-country, UEC European Championships
UCI XCO World Cup

2nd Nové Město I
2nd Nové Město II

2021
Internazionali d’Italia Series

1st Andora

2nd Cross-country, UCI World Championships
2nd Cross-country, UEC European Championships
5th Cross-country, Olympic Games
UCI XCO World Cup

5th Snowshoe

2022
1st Cross-country, National Championships
UCI XCO World Cup

1st Vallnord
2nd Petrópolis
3rd Snowshoe
5th Leogang
5th Lenzerheide

UCI XCC World Cup

2nd Leogang
2nd Vallnord
2nd Snowshoe

3rd Cross-country, UEC European Championships
2023
UCI XCO World Cup

2nd Lenzerheide

2024
1st Overall Cape Epic (with Nicole Koller)
2nd Cross-country, UCI World Championships
UCI XCO World Cup

5th Araxá
5th Les Gets
