= Tessa Neefjes =

Dutch cyclist (born 1996)

Personal information
- Born: 7 December 1996 (age 29)

Cycling career
- Sport: Cycling
- Current team: Giant Liv Benelux Offroad Team
- Disciplines: Road; Mountain biking; Gravel
- Role: Rider

Professional teams
- 2022: Proximus-Alphamotorhomes-Doltcini
- 2022: Giant Liv Benelux Offroad Team

Tessa Neefjes (born 7 December 1996) is a Dutch racing cyclist, who currently rides for Giant Liv Benelux Offroad Team. She's the 2022 European Champion Mountain bike Beach race and the 2022 Dutch Champion Mountain bike Marathon. In 2022 she won two UCI Gravel World Series races in Millau and Houffalize and the Dutch Gravel Series.

In 2016 she won the Dutch Road Championships in the category Elite without a contract. Later that year, during a training ride in the Ardennes, she was hit by a truck driver who drove on the wrong side of the road. The frontal collision caused 16 bone fractures in her back, shoulder, ribs and hand. After her recovery, she chose to ride additional off-road disciplines that she likes the most.

== Major results ==
=== Road ===
2016
1st Dutch National Champion, Elite without a contract

=== Mountain biking ===
2019
3rd Beach race, UEC European Mountain Bike Championships
2020
3rd Beach race, National Mountain Bike Championships
1st Beach races Egmond-pier-Egmond, ’s-Gravenzande, Katwijk, Julianadorp, Rockanje
2021
3rd Mitas 4 Islands MTB Marathon Stage Race, Croatia, with Rosa van Doorn
2022
1st Beach race, UEC European Mountain Bike Championships
1st Dutch National Champion Mountain Bike Marathon
1st Beach race Noordwijk
2nd Beach race, National Mountain Bike Championships
2023
2nd Beach race, National Mountain Bike Championships

=== Gravel ===
2022
1st Wish One Gravel Race, UCI Gravel World Series Millau
1st Houffa Gravel, UCI Gravel World Series Houffalize
1st Dutch Gravel series overall classification, and the races in Meerveld and Banholt
