= Benoît Coulanges =

French mountain biker

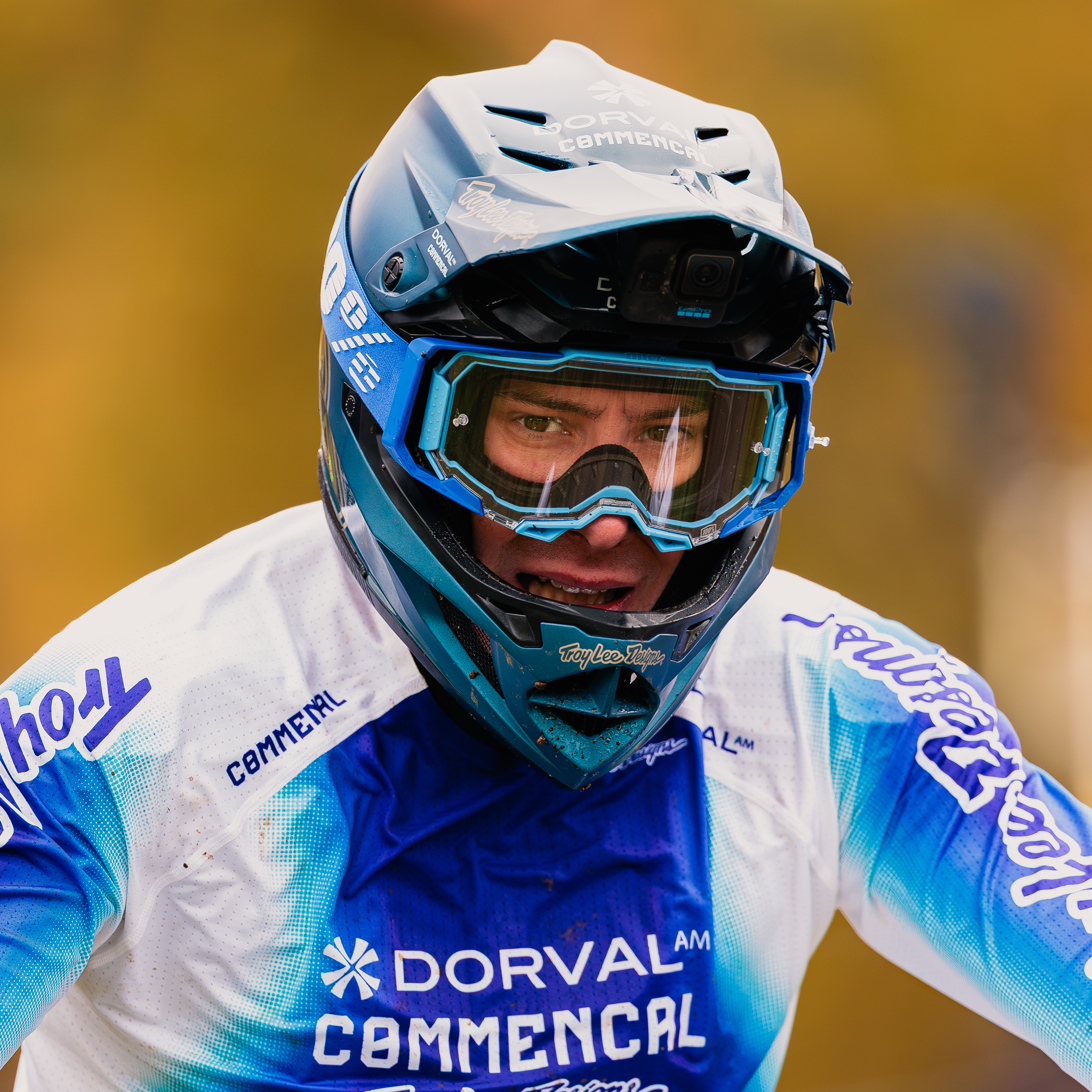

Personal information
- Born: 20 December 1994 (age 31)

Cycling career
- Sport: Cycling
- Discipline: Downhill
- Role: Rider
Medal record
Representing France
Mountain bike racing
World Championships
Silver medal – second place	2021 Val di Sole	Downhill
Silver medal – second place	2024 Vallnord	Downhill
European Championships
Silver medal – second place	2018 Lousã	Downhill
Silver medal – second place	2019 Pampilhosa da Serra	Downhill
Silver medal – second place	2021 Maribor	Downhill
Bronze medal – third place	2022 Maribor	Downhill

Benoît Coulanges (born 20 December 1994) is a French downhill mountain biker. In 2021, he finished second in the UCI Downhill World Championships in Val di Sole, Italy.

Winner of two downhill mountain bike world cup rounds in 2023 and 2024, each time in France. He is a member of the UCI Elite team DORVAL AM COMMENCAL.

== Major results ==
2018
2nd European Downhill Championships
2019
2nd European Downhill Championships
2020
1st National Downhill Championships
2nd European Downhill Championships
2021
1st National Downhill Championships
2nd Downhill, UCI Mountain Bike World Championships
