= Hans Becking =

Dutch cross-country mountain biker (born 1986)

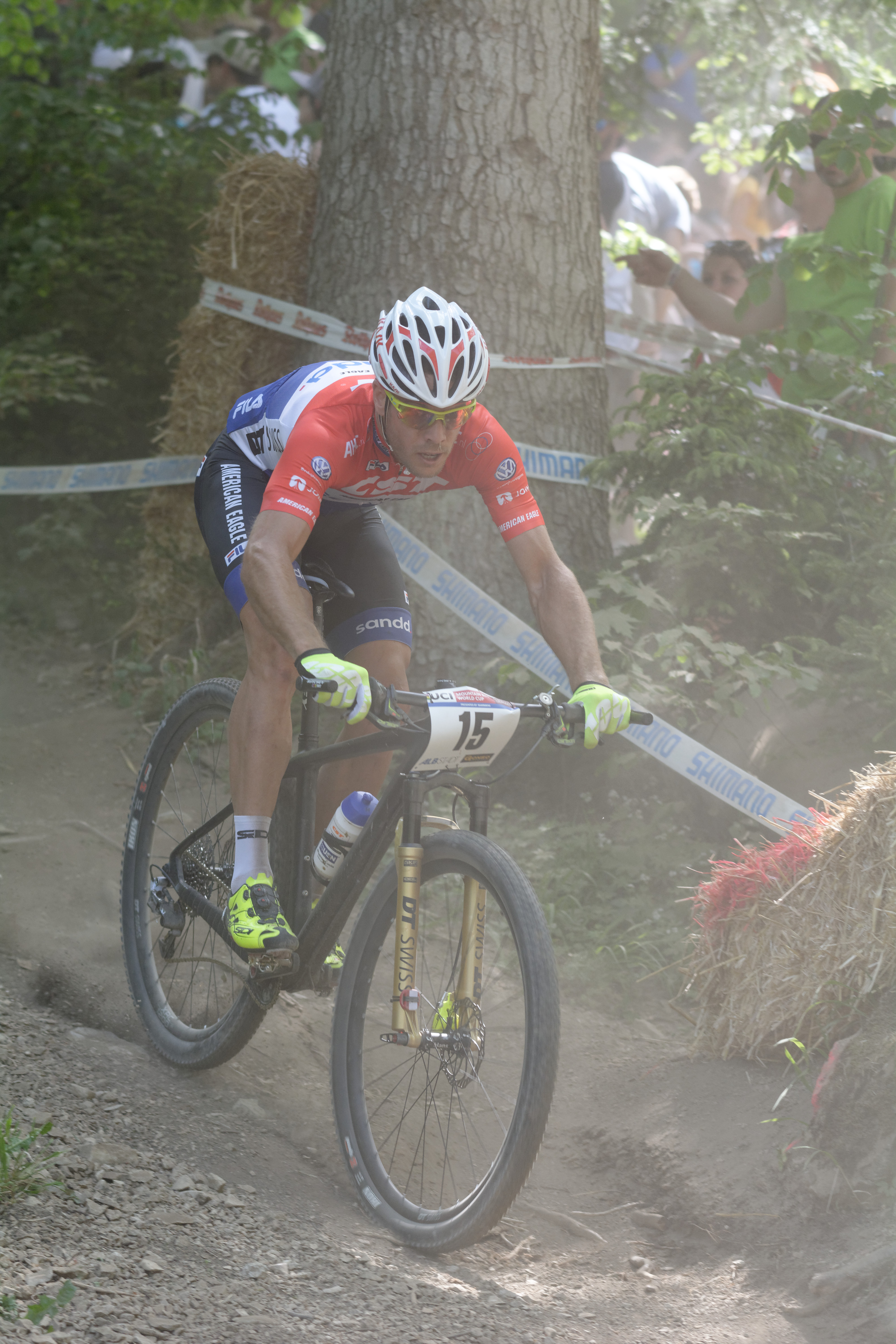
- Becking in 2017

Personal information
- Born: 19 March 1986 (age 40) Deventer, Netherlands

Cycling career
- Sport: Cycling
- Current team: BUFF Megamo Team
- Disciplines: Cross-country; Gravel; Road; Cyclo-cross
- Role: Rider

Amateur team
- 2015–2020: VDM Van Durme–Michiels–Trawobo

Professional teams
- 2015–2016: Betch.nl Superior Brentjens MTB Team
- 2017: CST Sandd AMerican Eagle MTB Team
- 2019–2020: DMT Racing Team by Marconi Projects
- 2021: Global 6 Cycling
- 2023–: BUFF Megamo Team

Hans Becking (born 19 March 1986) is a Dutch racing cyclist, who specializes in cross-country mountain biking and gravel racing. He is a two time national champion in the Olympic cross-country race, and a three-time champion in the cross-country marathon. In gravel racing, he has won the Gravel Adventure race in Poland, which is part of the UCI Gravel World Series, as well as the Safari and Migration Gravel Races in Kenya.

== Major results ==
=== Mountain bike ===
2003
3rd Cross-country, UEC European Junior Championships
2004
3rd Cross-country, UEC European Junior Championships
2011
2nd Cross-country, National Championships
2012
1st Cross-country, National Championships
2014
3rd Cross-country, National Championships
2015
National Championships

2nd Cross-country
3rd Cross-country marathon

2016
1st Cross-country, National Championships
2017
2nd Cross-country, National Championships
2018
2nd Cross-country, National Championships
2019
National Championships

1st Cross-country marathon
3rd Cross-country

2021
1st Cross-country marathon, National Championships
2023
1st Cross-country marathon, National Championships

=== Gravel ===
2024
1st Overall Migration Gravel Race

1st Stage 4

UCI World Series

1st Gravel Adventure

1st Safari Gravel Race
2nd Overall Santa Vall

1st Stage 1
