= Michiel van der Heijden =

Dutch cyclist (born 1992)

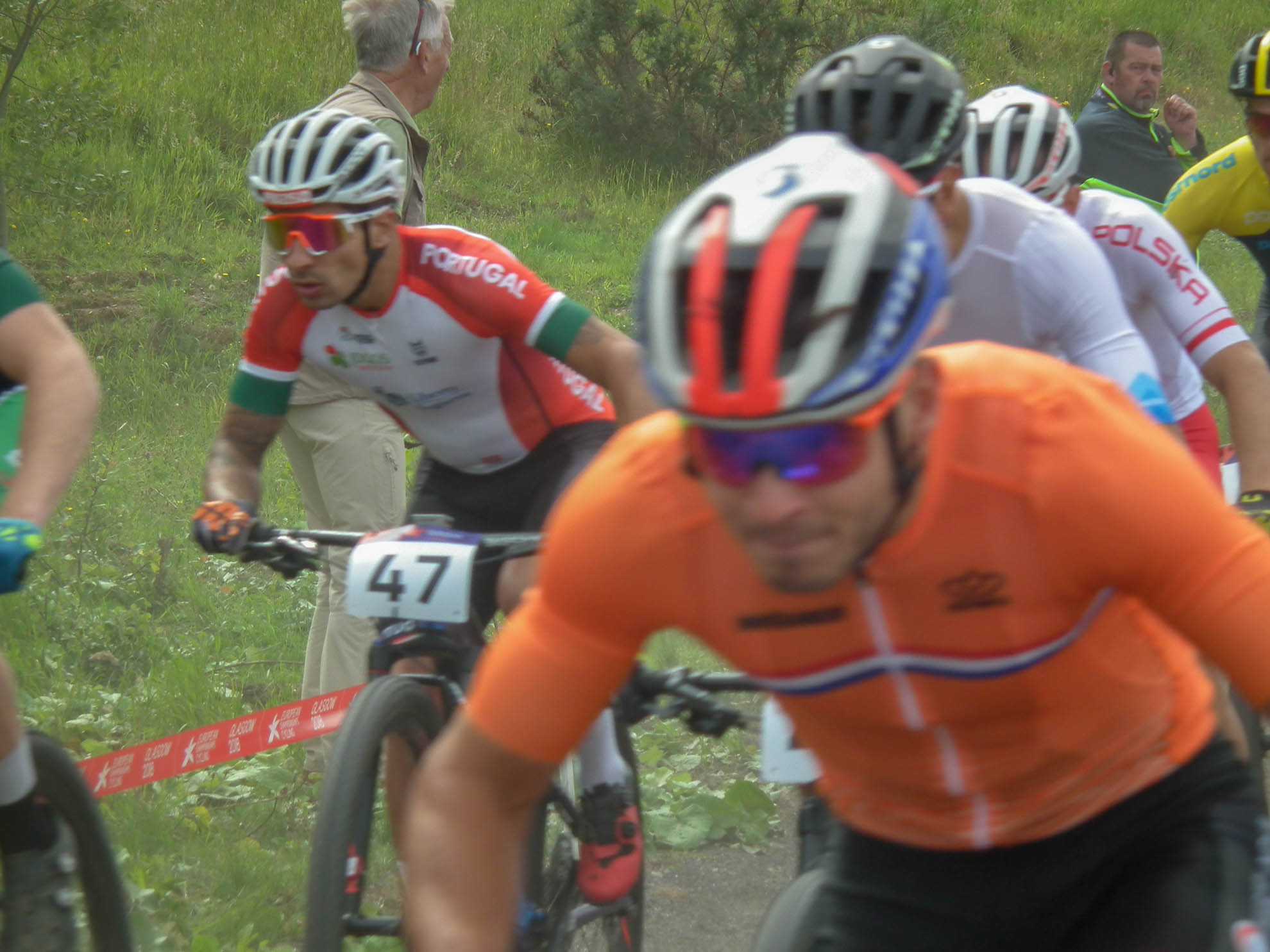
- Van der Heijden (right)

Personal information
- Born: 3 January 1992 (age 34) 's-Hertogenbosch, Netherlands
- Height: 1.73 m (5 ft 8 in)
- Weight: 63 kg (139 lb)

Cycling career
- Sport: Cycling
- Current team: Retired
- Disciplines: Mountain biking; Cyclo-cross

Professional teams
- 2010: Merida–Combee
- 2011–2012: Rabobank–Giant
- 2013–2014: Giant Pro XC Team
- 2015–2017: Scott–Odlo
Medal record
Men's mountain bike racing
Representing Netherlands
Men's mountain bike racing
World Championships
Gold medal – first place	2014 Hafjell	Under-23 cross-country
Gold medal – first place	2010 Mont Sainte-Anne	Junior cross-country
Silver medal – second place	2012 Saalfelden-Leogang	Under-23 cross-country
Bronze medal – third place	2013 Pietermaritzburg	Under-23 cross-country
European Championships
Silver medal – second place	2012 Moscow	Under-23 Cross-country
Silver medal – second place	2014 Sankt Wendel	Under-23 Cross-country
Silver medal – second place	2009 Zoetermeer	Junior Cross-country
Bronze medal – third place	2009 Zoetermeer	Mixed team relay
Bronze medal – third place	2012 Moscow	Mixed team relay
Bronze medal – third place	2010 Haifa	Junior Cross-country
Men's cyclo-cross
World Championships
Bronze medal – third place	2012 Koksijde	Under-23
European Championships
Bronze medal – third place	2009 Hoogstraten	Junior

Michiel van der Heijden (born 3 January 1992) is a Dutch former professional mountain biker and cyclo-cross cyclist.

Van der Heijden won a silver medal for mountain biking in the 2009 European Championships in Zoetermeer, and a bronze medal in 2010 in Haifa. In 2011 he became Dutch National Champion for the 9th time.

In 2010 van der Heijden became World Champion XCO juniors in Mont-Sainte-Anne, Canada, making him the second Dutch XCO World Champion after Bart Brentjens. He was on the start list for the 2018 Cross-country European Championship and he finished

== Major results ==
=== Mountain bike ===
2009
1st Cross-country, National Junior Championships
2nd Cross-country, European Junior Championships
3rd Mixed team relay, European Championships
2010
1st Cross-country, UCI World Junior Championships
1st Cross-country, National Junior Championships
UCI Junior XCO World Cup

1st Dalby Forest
1st Offenbourg
1st Houffalize

3rd Cross-country, European Junior Championships
2012
1st Overall UCI Under-23 XCO World Cup

1st Mont-Sainte-Anne
1st Windham
2nd Nové Město

2nd Cross-country, UCI World Under-23 Championships
2nd Cross-country, European Under-23 Championships
3rd Mixed team relay, European Championships
2013
1st Cross-country, National Championships
3rd Cross-country, UCI World Under-23 Championships
3rd Overall UCI Under-23 XCO World Cup

3rd Albstadt
3rd Hafjell
3rd Nové Město

2014
1st Cross-country, UCI World Under-23 Championships
1st Cross-country, National Championships
2nd Overall UCI Under-23 XCO World Cup

1st Mont-Sainte-Anne
2nd Nové Město
2nd Albstadt
2nd Pietermaritzburg
3rd Méribel
3rd Cairns

2nd Cross-country, European Under-23 Championships
2015
1st Cross-country, National Championships
2016
3rd Cross-country, National Championships
2017
1st Cross-country, National Championships
2018
3rd Cross-country, National Championships

=== Cyclo-cross ===
2008–2009
3rd Zonnebeke Juniors
3rd Hoogstraten, Junior Superprestige
2009–2010
1st Kopenberg, Junior Gazet van Antwerpen
2nd National Junior Championships
3rd European Junior Championships
3rd Gavere, Junior Superprestige
4th Overall UCI Under-23 World Cup

2nd Koksijde

2011–2012
3rd UCI World Under-23 Championships
3rd Hoogerheide, UCI Under-23 World Cup
2012–2013
1st Citadelcross Under-23
2nd Koksijde, UCI Under-23 World Cup
2013–2014
2nd Grand Prix Hotel Threeland
