= Samuele Porro =

Italian cyclist (born 2000)

Personal information
- Born: 15 May 1988 (age 38) Como, Italy
- Height: 1.73 m (5 ft 8 in)
- Weight: 60 kg (132 lb)

Cycling career
- Sport: Cycling
- Current team: Klimatzia Orbea Team
- Discipline: Mountain bike
- Role: Rider
- Rider type: Marathon

Professional teams
- 2007–2009: Team CBE Tecnoimpianti ASD
- 2020–2021: Team Trek–Pirelli
- 2022–2023: Wilier Triestina–Pirelli Factory Team
- 2025–: Klimatzia Orbea Team
Medal record
Representing Italy
Men's mountain bike racing
World Championships
Silver medal – second place	2025 Valais	Marathon
Bronze medal – third place	2019 Grächen	Marathon
European Championships
Silver medal – second place	2018 Spilimbergo	Marathon
Silver medal – second place	2019 Kvam	Marathon
Silver medal – second place	2021 Evolène	Marathon

Samuele Porro (born 15 May 1988) is an Italian cross-country mountain biker. A six-time national champion, Porro has also won medals in the cross-country marathon at the World and European Championships.

== Major results ==
2013
3rd Marathon, National Championships
2014
1st Marathon, National Championships
2015
1st Marathon, National Championships
2016
3rd Marathon, National Championships
2017
1st Grand Raid BCVS
2nd Marathon, National Championships
2018
1st Marathon, National Championships
2nd Marathon, UEC European Championships
2019
1st Marathon, National Championships
2nd Marathon, UEC European Championships
3rd Marathon, UCI World Championships
2020
1st Marathon, National Championships
2021
2nd Marathon, UEC European Championships
2024
4th Overall UCI XCM World Cup

3rd Nové Město na Moravě
3rd Megève

2025
2nd Marathon, UCI World Championships
