= 2021 European Mountain Bike Championships =

- Venue: (Switzerland) Evolène (Spain) Vielha (Slovenia) Maribor (Serbia) Novi Sad (France) Dunkirk
- Date: 20 June-12 December 2021
- Events: 13

The 2021 European Mountain Bike Championships was the 32nd edition of the European Mountain Bike Championships, an annual mountain biking competition organized by the Union Européenne de Cyclisme (UEC). The championships comprised six disciplines: downhill, cross-country cycling (XC), cross-country marathon (XCM), cross-country ultra-marathon, cross-country eliminator (XCE), and beach race.

== Dates and venues ==
- (Switzerland) Evolène : 20 June (cross-country marathon)
- (Spain) Vielha : 26 June (cross-country ultra-marathon)
- (Slovenia) Maribor : 6–8 August (downhill)
- (Serbia) Novi Sad : 12–15 August (cross-country, cross-country eliminator, team relay)
- (France) Dunkirk : 12 December (beach race)

== Medal summary ==
=== Cross-country ===
Event	Gold		Silver		Bronze	
Men	(Switzerland) Lars Forster	1:26:30	(Denmark) Sebastian Fini Carstensen	1:26:33	(Switzerland) Filippo Colombo	1:26:34
Women	(France) Pauline Ferrand-Prévot	1:26:36	(Netherlands) Anne Terpstra	1:27:54	(Netherlands) Anne Tauber	1:28:14

=== Cross-country eliminator ===
Event	Gold		Silver		Bronze	
Men	(Netherlands) Jeroen Van Eck	1:43.39	(France) Lorenzo Serres	1:46.58	(Sweden) Joel Burman	1:48.37
Women	(Italy) Gaia Tormena	1:55.10	(Netherlands) Fem Van Empel	2:01.11	(Ukraine) Iryna Popova	2:01.49

=== Cross-country marathon ===
Event	Gold		Silver		Bronze	
Men	(Germany) Andreas Seewald	4:02:50	(Italy) Samuele Porro	4:06:47	(Czech Republic) Martin Stosek	4:10:48
Women	(Spain) Natalia Fischer	4:05:16	(Switzerland) Steffi Häberlin	4:10:27	(Switzerland) Ramona Forchini	4:12:42

=== Cross-country ultra-marathon ===
Event	Gold		Silver		Bronze	
Men	(Austria) Philip Handl	9:41:29	(Spain) Llibert Mill Garcia	9:48:07	(Germany) Dominik Schwaiger	9:49:27
Women	(Spain) Anna Ramírez Bauxel	11:54:54	(Spain) Ramona Gabriel Batalla	12:07:16	(Spain) Marta Tora Mila	12:22:51

=== Team Relay ===
Event	Gold		Silver		Bronze	
Mixed Team	(Italy) Italy; Luca Braidot; Filippo Agostinacchio; Martina Berta; Sara Cortinovis; Marika Tovo; Juri Zanotti	1:08:06	(Switzerland) Switzerland; Vital Albin; Nils Aebersold; Alessandra Keller; Jacqueline Schneebeli; Lea Huber; Alexandre Balmer	1:08:23	(Germany) Germany; Leon Kaiser; Lars Gräter; Nina Benz; Finja Lipp; Ronja Eibl; Niklas Schehl	1:08:40

=== Downhill ===
Event	Gold		Silver		Bronze	
Men	(France) Loris Vergier	2.56,67	(France) Benoit Coulanges	2.57,10	(United Kingdom) Danny Hart	2.58,62
Women	(Slovenia) Monika Hrastnik	3.27,02	(Italy) Eleonora Farina	3.31,05	(Italy) Veronika Widmann	3.32,16

=== Beachrace ===
Event	Gold		Silver		Bronze	
Men	(France) Samuel Leroux	1:24:28	(Netherlands) Rick Van Breda	1:24:35	(Netherlands) Coen Vermeltfoort	1:24:47
Women	(Netherlands) Pauliena Rooijakkers	1:32:54	(Netherlands) Riejanne Markus	1:36:35	(Netherlands) Rozanne Slik	1:38:56
