= Ronan van Zandbeek =

Dutch road racing cyclist

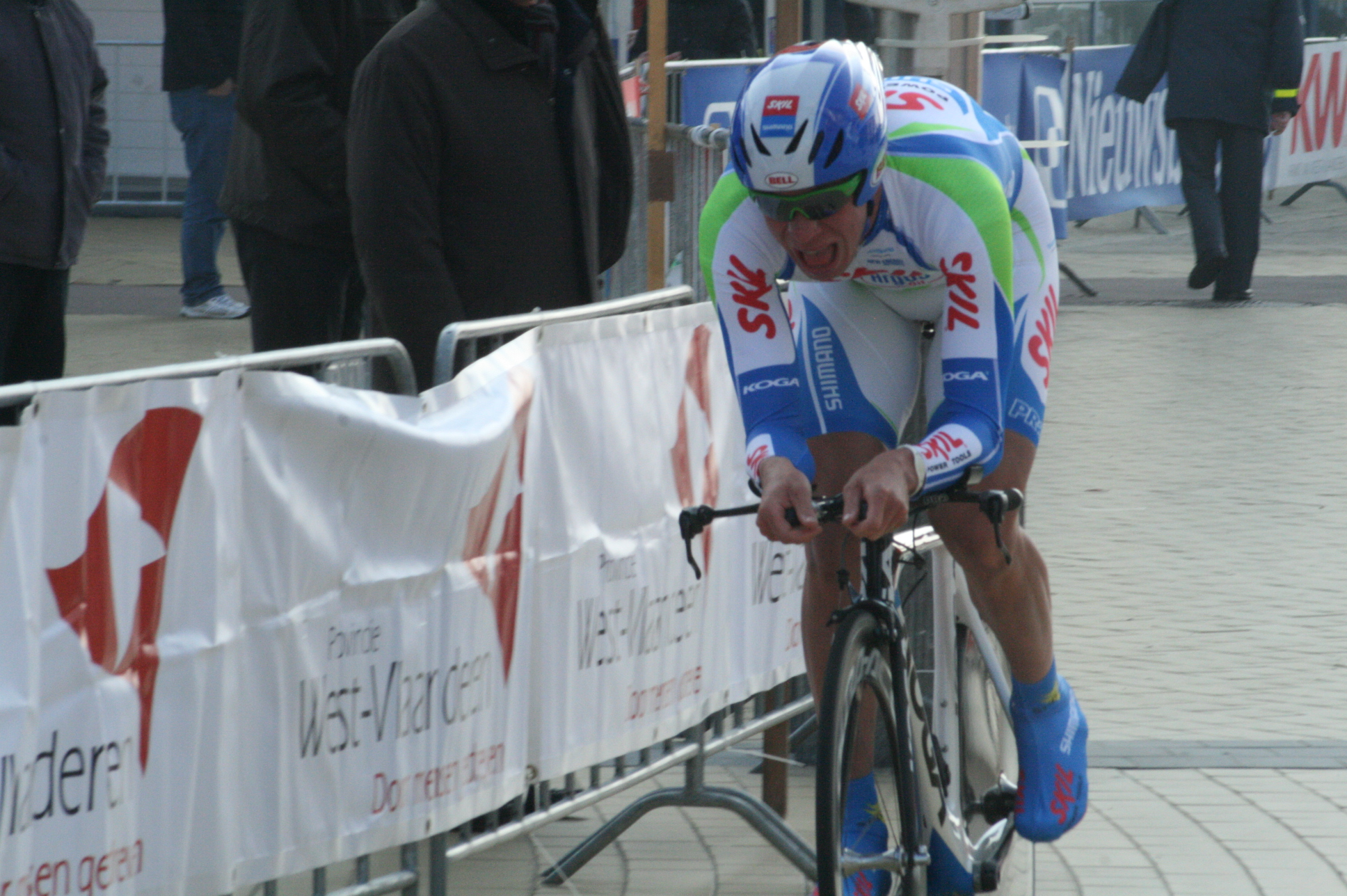
- Van Zandbeek at the 2011 Driedaagse van West-Vlaanderen.

Personal information
- Full name: Ronan van Zandbeek
- Born: 27 September 1988 (age 38) 's-Hertogenbosch, the Netherlands
- Height: 1.84 m (6 ft 0 in)
- Weight: 72 kg (159 lb)

Cycling career
- Sport: Cycling
- Disciplines: Road; Mountain biking
- Role: Rider

Amateur teams
- 2007–2010: Van Vliet–EBH Advocaten
- 2010: Skil–Shimano (stagiaire)
- 2016–2018: WV Westland Wil Vooruit
- 2019–2020: Team Invicta

Professional teams
- 2011–2012: Skil–Shimano
- 2013–2015: Cycling Team De Rijke–Shanks

Major wins
- National Under-23 Road Race Championships (2008); Tour de Normandie (2010); Kampioenschap van Vlaanderen (2012)

Ronan van Zandbeek (born 27 September 1988) is a Dutch cyclist, who most recently rode for Dutch amateur team Invicta.

Born in 's-Hertogenbosch, van Zandbeek competed as a professional between 2011 and 2015, joining the Skil–Shimano team full-time after a stagiaire contract with the team in the second half of 2010. Having previously won the Tour de Normandie as an amateur in 2010, van Zandbeek won his first professional race in September 2012 as he won the Kampioenschap van Vlaanderen event. Van Zandbeek had accelerated away from five other riders in the closing stages of the race.

== Major results ==
2006
1st Stage 5 Tour de Lorraine
3rd Road race, UEC European Junior Road Championships
3rd Time trial, National Junior Road Championships
3rd Overall Driedaagse van Axel

1st Stage 2 (ITT)

2007
3rd Time trial, National Under-23 Road Championships
3rd Dorpenomloop door Drenthe
2008
1st Road race, National Under-23 Road Championships
2nd Beek Ubbergen
5th Overall Tour du Haut-Anjou
2009
1st Ronde van Haarlemmerliede en Spaarnwoude
2nd Ronde van Zuid-Holland
5th Duo Normand
8th Overall Tour du Haut-Anjou
9th Ronde van Vlaanderen U23
9th Paris–Roubaix Espoirs
2010
1st Overall Tour de Normandie
4th Paris–Roubaix Espoirs
10th Profronde van Fryslan
2011
4th Overall Tour de Wallonie-Picarde
2012
1st Kampioenschap van Vlaanderen
2013
1st Prologue (TTT) Volta a Portugal
7th Arno Wallaard Memorial
7th Memorial Van Coningsloo
2014
8th Arno Wallaard Memorial
10th Overall Flèche du Sud

1st Mountains classification

2015
4th Overall Olympia's Tour
6th Ster van Zwolle
