= Rémy Rochas =

French racing cyclist

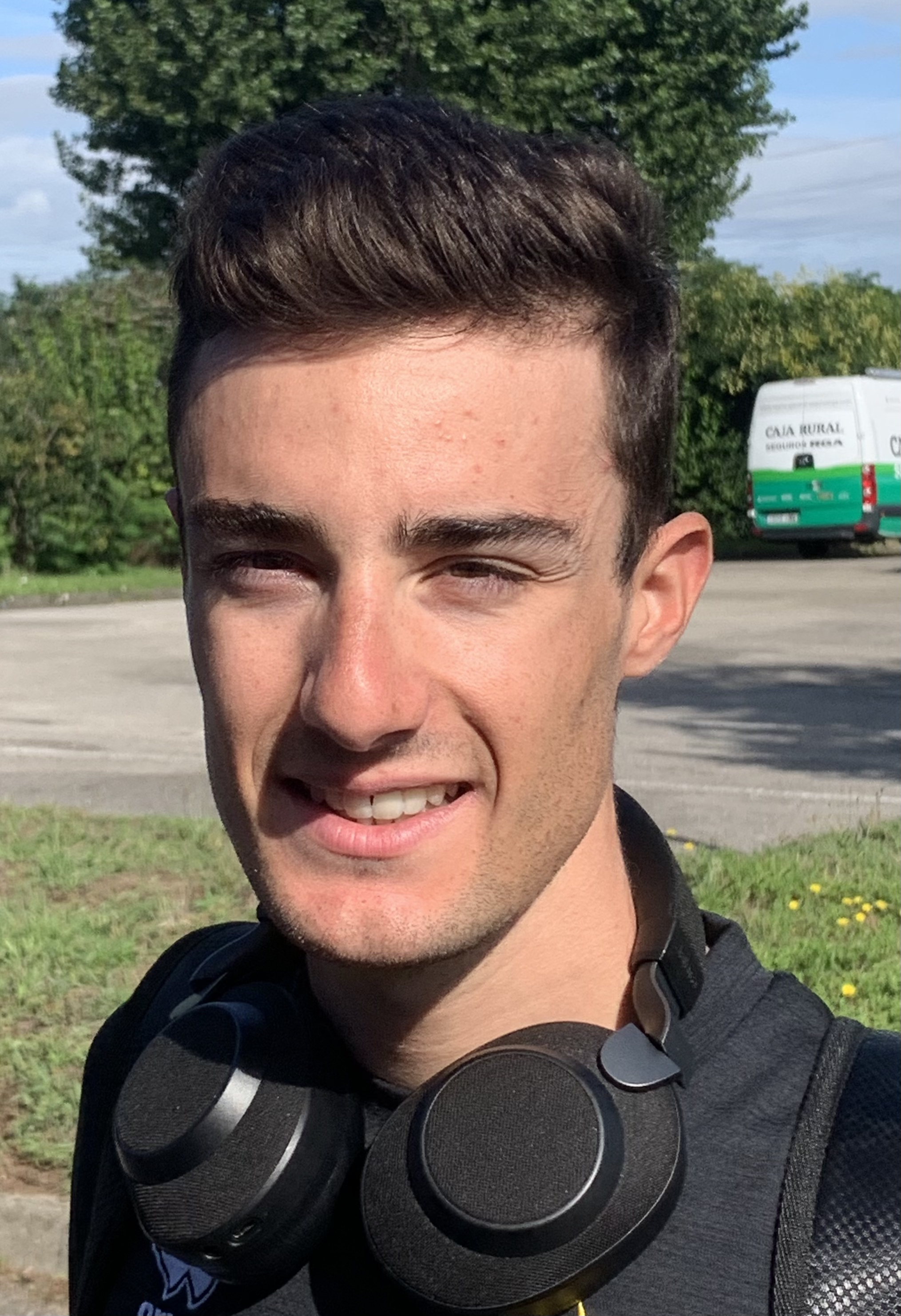
- Rochas in 2021

Personal information
- Full name: Rémy Rochas
- Born: 18 May 1996 (age 30) La Motte-Servolex, France
- Height: 1.64 m (5 ft 5 in)
- Weight: 51 kg (112 lb)

Cycling career
- Sport: Cycling
- Current team: Groupama–FDJ United
- Discipline: Road
- Role: Rider
- Rider type: Climber

Amateur teams
- 2015–2017: Chambéry CF
- 2018: Bourg-en-Bresse Ain

Professional teams
- 2016: AG2R La Mondiale (stagiaire)
- 2018: Delko–Marseille Provence KTM (stagiaire)
- 2019–2020: Delko–Marseille Provence
- 2021–2023: Cofidis
- 2024–: Groupama–FDJ

Rémy Rochas (born 18 May 1996 in La Motte-Servolex) is a French professional road cyclist, who currently rides for UCI WorldTeam Groupama–FDJ United.

== Major results ==
2013
6th Overall Tour du Valromey

1st Mountains classification

6th Overall Giro di Basilicata
2015
6th Overall Kreiz Breizh Elites
2016
1st Stage 2 Ronde de l'Isard
8th Overall Kreiz Breizh Elites
2017
6th Overall Ronde de l'Isard
2018
5th Overall Tour of Almaty
6th Tour du Gévaudan Occitanie
2020
4th Overall Sibiu Cycling Tour
2021
5th Veneto Classic
8th Overall Volta a la Comunitat Valenciana
8th Overall Tour de l'Ain
2022
2nd Giro del Veneto
8th Veneto Classic
2023
2nd Overall Tour of Guangxi
8th Overall Tour du Limousin
2024
5th Overall Étoile de Bessèges
2025
8th Cadel Evans Great Ocean Road Race

=== Grand Tour general classification results timeline ===
Grand Tour	2021	2022	2023	2024	2025
Giro d'Italia	DNF	71	DNF	—	39
Tour de France	—	—	—	—	
Vuelta a España	15	DNF	28	DNF	

Legend
—	Did not compete
DNF	Did not finish
