= Laura van Regenmortel =

Dutch cyclist

Personal information
- Born: 26 June 1992 (age 34)

Cycling career
- Sport: Cycling
- Discipline: Road
- Role: Rider

Amateur teams
- 2017–2018: Restore Cycling Team
- 2019: Swabo Women Development Team

Professional team
- 2020: Biehler Krush Pro Cycling

Laura van Regenmortel (born 26 June 1992) is a Dutch professional racing cyclist, who most recently rode for UCI Women's Continental Team Biehler Krush Pro Cycling.
