= David Trummer =

Austrian mountain biker

Personal information
- Born: 1 June 1994 (age 32)

Cycling career
- Sport: Cycling
- Discipline: Downhill
- Role: Rider
Medal record
Representing Austria
Mountain bike racing
World Championships
Silver medal – second place	2020 Leogang	Downhill

David Trummer (born 1 June 1994) is an Austrian downhill mountain biker. In 2020, he finished second to British rider Reece Wilson in the UCI Downhill World Championships in Leogang, Austria.

== Major results ==
2015
1st National Downhill Championships
2018
1st National Downhill Championships
2019
1st National Downhill Championships
3rd European Downhill Championships
2020
1st National Downhill Championships
2nd Downhill, UCI Mountain Bike World Championships
