= Laura Turpijn =

Dutch mountain biker (born 1978)

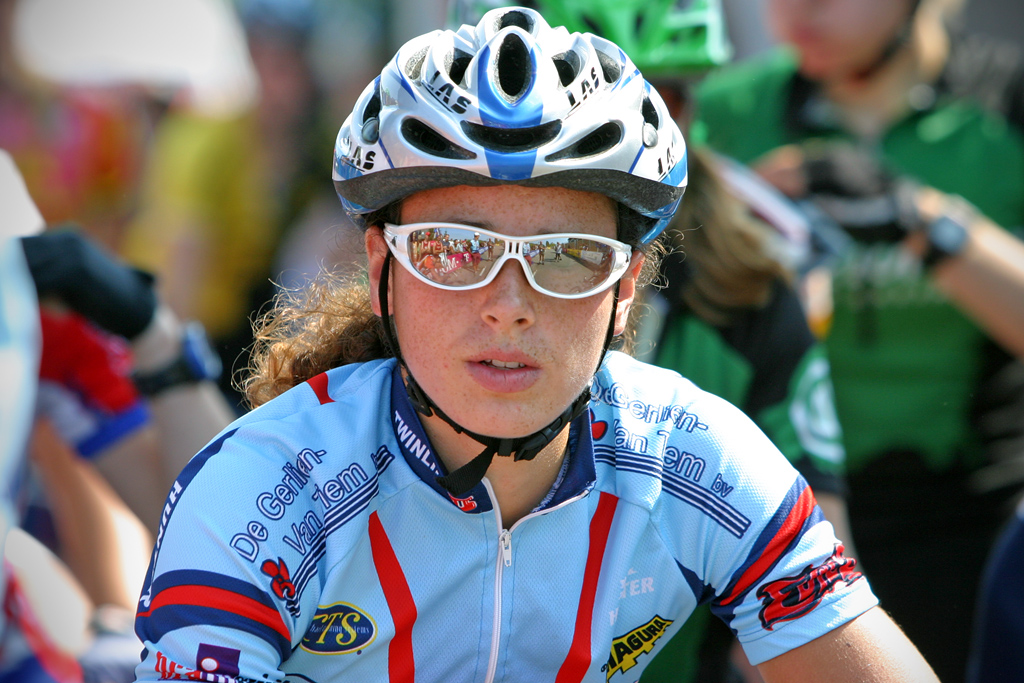
- Laura Turpijn at the start of the 2004 Dutch MTB Championships

Personal information
- Born: 26 December 1978 (age 47) Nijmegen, the Netherlands

Cycling career
- Sport: Cycling
- Current team: KONA LTD Team
- Discipline: MTB
- Role: Rider

Professional teams
- 2006-2011: Binnenvaart-Merida MTB Team
- 2012-2014: MPL Specialized
- 2016-present: KONA LTD Team

Laura Turpijn (Nijmegen, December 26, 1978 ) is a Dutch mountain biker. She is a multiple Dutch champion in this discipline and has represented the Netherlands several times in the European and World championships.

== Cycling career ==
Turpijn made her breakthrough in 2007 by becoming the Dutch MTB National Champion in both Marathon and Cross Country (XC). She started that year at the European Cross Country championship in Fort William, Scotland, but didn't achieve a significant result due to equipment failure.

In 2010 she came 11th at the European Cross Country Championship in Haifa and had to settle for 33rd place at the Cross Country World Championship in Mont-Sainte-Anne, Canada. In 2011 she came 6th in the European Marathon championship in Kleinzell, Austria, over 21 minutes behind to winner Pia Sundstedt from Finland. She was the Dutch MTB Champion in Marathon in 2008 and 2010, and Champion in XC 2009 and 2012, the last year she competed professionally.

In 2011 and 2013, Turpijn was named Dutch Female MTB rider of the year in an award presented by Club van 5.

== International championships ==
- 2007: 34th World Championships XC in Fort William
- 2010: 11th European Championships XC in Haifa
- 2010: 33rd World Championships XC in Mont-Sainte-Anne
- 2011: 6th European Championships marathon in Kleinzell

== Key victories ==
- Dutch MTB Championships (XC): 2007, 2009, 2012
- Dutch MTCH Championships (marathon): 2007, 2008, 2010
- Beach Challenge: 2007
- BeNeLux MTB championship: 2006
- Rabobank MTB Trophy Steps Belt : 2010, 2011
- Antwerp Cup: 2011
- Oldenzaal MTB: 2006
- Berlicum: 2006
