= Bas Peters =

Dutch cyclist

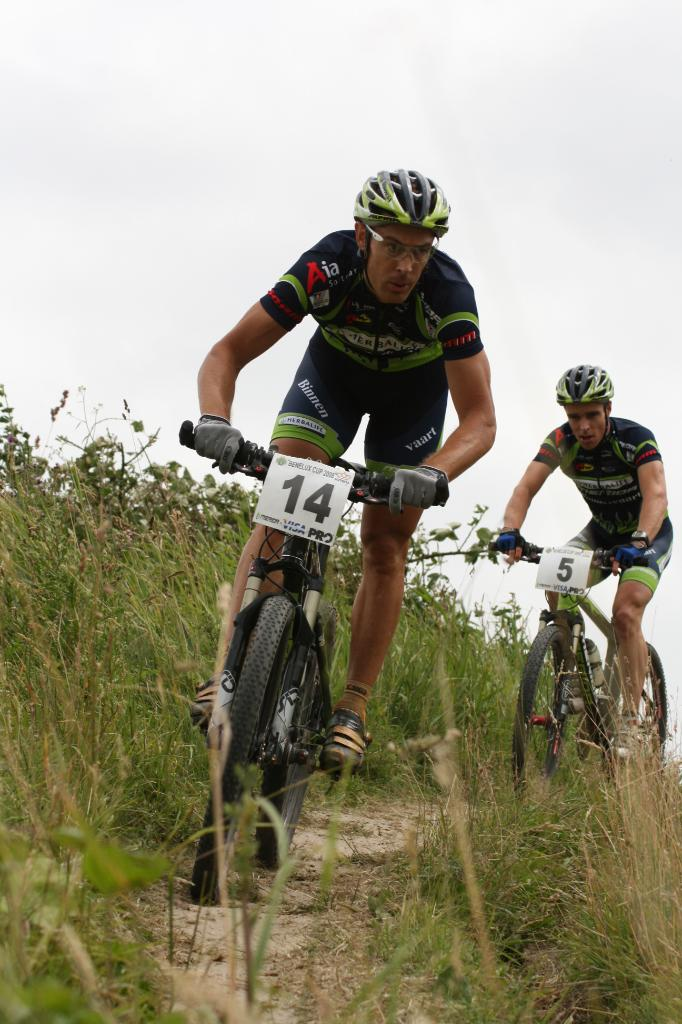
- Bas Peters competing in 2008

Personal information
- Born: 14 May 1976 (age 50) Heel, Limburg, Netherlands

Cycling career
- Sport: Cycling
- Discipline: Mountain biking
- Role: Rider

Professional team
- 2004: Dutch Olympic Cycling Team

Bas Peters (born 14 May 1976 in Heel, Limburg) is a Dutch cyclist specializing in competitive mountain biking. Peters represented the Netherlands at the 2004 Summer Olympics in Athens where he finished in 13th position where his teammate Bart Brentjens won the bronze medal.

== See also ==
- List of Dutch Olympic cyclists
