= Mashan County =

Mashan County 马山县 · Majsanh Yen
- County
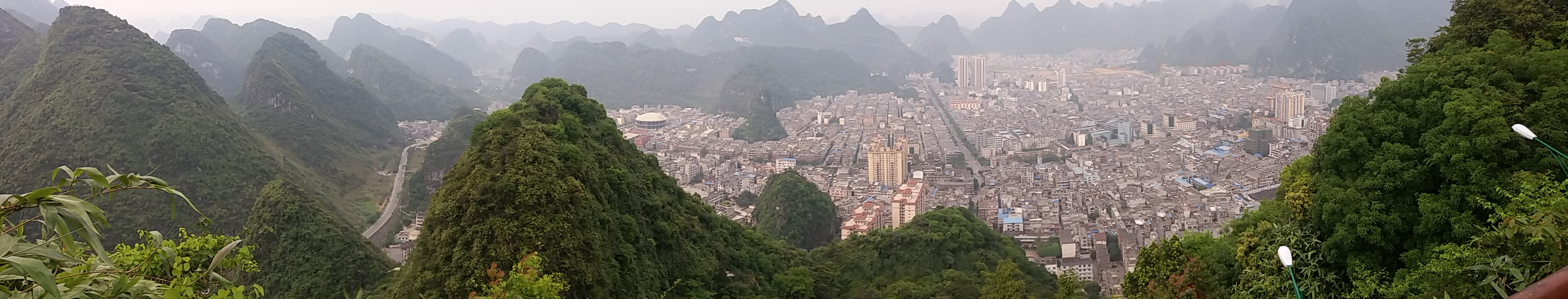
- Panorama of Baishan Town

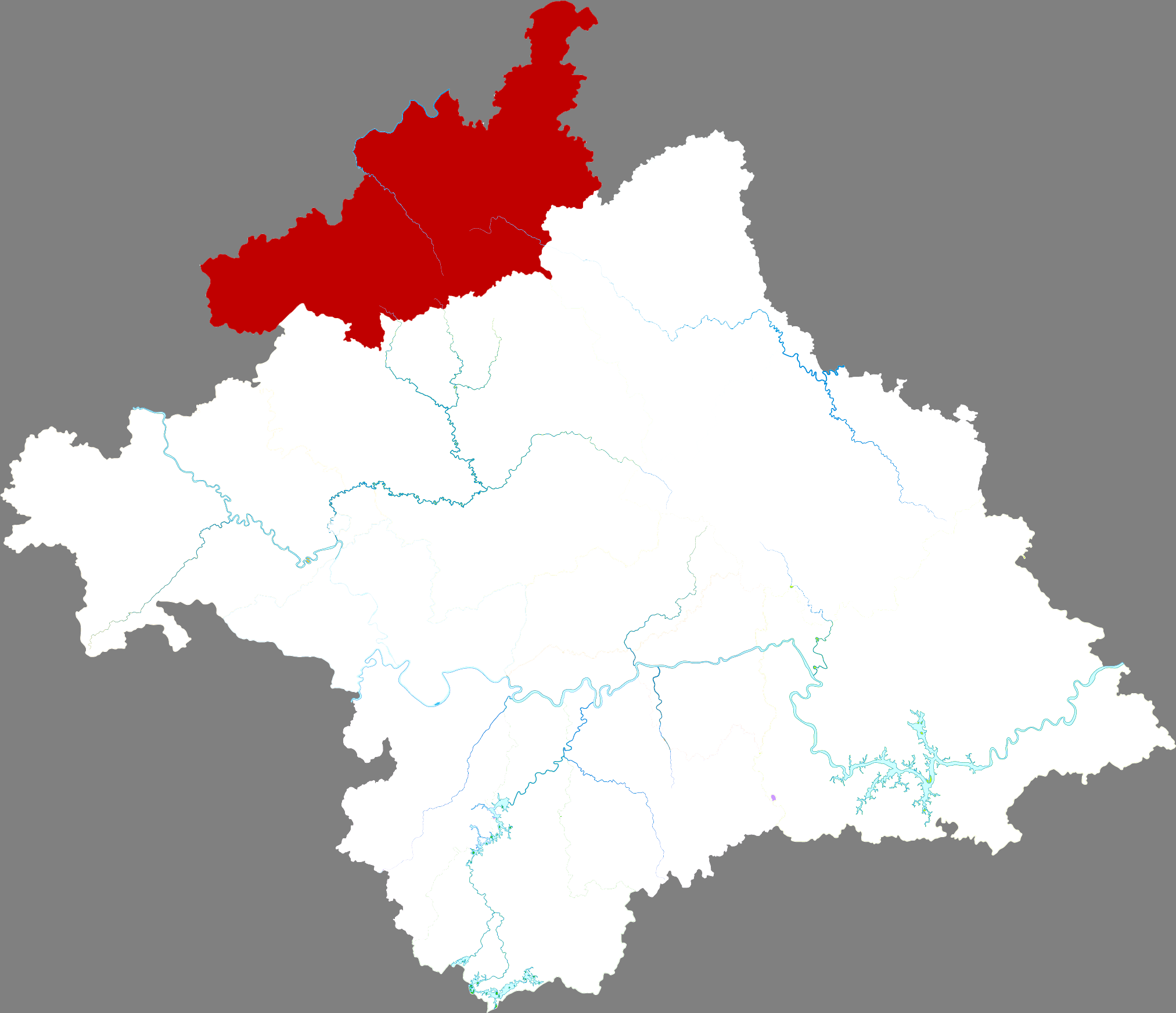
- Location in Nanning

- Location in Guangxi
- Coordinates: 23°42′32″N 108°10′41″E
- Country: China
- Autonomous region: Guangxi
- Prefecture-level city: Nanning
- County seat: Baishan

Area
  - Total: 2,345.33 km^{2} (905.54 sq mi)

Population (2010)
  - Total: 390,900
  - Density: 166.7/km^{2} (431.7/sq mi)
- Time zone: UTC+8 (China Standard)
- Postal code: 530600
- Website: msx.nanning.gov.cn

Mashan County (simplified Chinese: 马山县; traditional Chinese: 馬山縣; pinyin: Mǎshān Xiàn; Standard Zhuang: Majsanh Yen) is a county of Guangxi Zhuang Autonomous Region, China, it is under the administration of the prefecture-level city of Nanning, the capital of Guangxi. The northernmost county-level division of Nanning City, it borders the prefecture-level cities of Hechi to the north and Laibin to the northeast.

== Administrative divisions ==
Mashan County is divided into 7 towns, 2 townships and 2 ethnic townships:

towns

- Baishan Town 白山镇
- Bailongtan Town 百龙滩镇
- Linxu Town 林圩镇
- Guling Town 古零镇
- Jincha Town 金钗镇
- Zhoulu Town 周鹿镇
- Yongzhou Town 永州镇

townships

- Qiaoli Township 乔利乡
- Jiafang Township 加方乡

ethnic townships

- Guzhai Yao Ethnic Township 古寨瑶族乡
- Lidang Yao Ethnic Township 里当瑶族乡

== Population ==
492,500 in 2000, with 75.8% as Zhuang ethnic group population

== Transportation ==
- China National Highway 210

== Climate ==
Climate data for Mashan, elevation 219 m (719 ft), (1991–2020 normals, extremes 1981–2010)
Month	Jan	Feb	Mar	Apr	May	Jun	Jul	Aug	Sep	Oct	Nov	Dec	Year
Record high °C (°F)	28.2 (82.8)	32.8 (91.0)	35.2 (95.4)	37.0 (98.6)	38.1 (100.6)	37.2 (99.0)	38.6 (101.5)	40.1 (104.2)	38.8 (101.8)	35.0 (95.0)	32.7 (90.9)	29.6 (85.3)	40.1 (104.2)
Mean daily maximum °C (°F)	15.8 (60.4)	18.0 (64.4)	20.8 (69.4)	26.3 (79.3)	30.1 (86.2)	31.8 (89.2)	32.8 (91.0)	33.1 (91.6)	31.8 (89.2)	28.2 (82.8)	23.9 (75.0)	18.7 (65.7)	25.9 (78.7)
Daily mean °C (°F)	12.4 (54.3)	14.5 (58.1)	17.4 (63.3)	22.4 (72.3)	25.8 (78.4)	27.6 (81.7)	28.4 (83.1)	28.4 (83.1)	27.0 (80.6)	23.6 (74.5)	19.2 (66.6)	14.5 (58.1)	21.8 (71.2)
Mean daily minimum °C (°F)	10.1 (50.2)	12.1 (53.8)	15.0 (59.0)	19.6 (67.3)	22.8 (73.0)	24.9 (76.8)	25.5 (77.9)	25.3 (77.5)	23.6 (74.5)	20.3 (68.5)	16.1 (61.0)	11.6 (52.9)	18.9 (66.0)
Record low °C (°F)	1.5 (34.7)	1.8 (35.2)	3.2 (37.8)	9.0 (48.2)	13.8 (56.8)	17.4 (63.3)	20.2 (68.4)	20.6 (69.1)	15.5 (59.9)	11.3 (52.3)	5.6 (42.1)	1.0 (33.8)	1.0 (33.8)
Average precipitation mm (inches)	63.1 (2.48)	40.6 (1.60)	83.8 (3.30)	109.6 (4.31)	243.7 (9.59)	385.0 (15.16)	301.9 (11.89)	217.7 (8.57)	117.5 (4.63)	70.6 (2.78)	57.6 (2.27)	46.4 (1.83)	1,737.5 (68.41)
Average precipitation days (≥ 0.1 mm)	12.4	11.8	17.2	15.1	16.2	19.4	18.4	16.4	10.8	8.2	8.6	8.8	163.3
Average snowy days	0.1	0	0	0	0	0	0	0	0	0	0	0.1	0.2
Average relative humidity (%)	74	75	79	77	76	80	78	77	73	69	70	68	75
Mean monthly sunshine hours	55.1	50.3	45.9	84.5	129.4	130.2	171.7	188.4	176.5	153.7	123.5	103.7	1,412.9
Percentage possible sunshine	16	16	12	22	31	32	42	47	48	43	38	31	32
Source: China Meteorological Administration
