= Corine Dorland =

Dutch cyclist

Personal information
- Full name: Corine Stam-Dorland
- Nickname: "The Queen of BMX"
- Born: 30 June 1973 (age 53) Loenen, Netherlands
- Height: 1.7 m (5 ft 7 in) (c. 1992)
- Weight: 60 kg (132 lb) (c. 1992)

Cycling career
- Sport: Cycling
- Current team: Retired
- Disciplines: Bicycle Motocross (BMX); Mountain bike racing(MTB; Cyclo-cross
- Role: Racer
- Rider type: BMX: Off Road; MTB: Cross-country

Amateur teams
- 1982: Peugeot
- 1983–1986: Vicuna Kuwahara (Europe)
- 1987–1988: AMEV Nederland b.v.
- 1988–1989: Be-One
- 1990: Royal Dutch KNWU
- 1990–1991: Sunn
- 1992–1996: GT Bicycles (Europe)

Professional teams
- 1997–1999: VSB Batavus
- 2000–2001: Be-One
- 2002: Power Plate/Bik
- 2003: Bik/Powerplate
- 2004: Bik/Gios
Medal record
Women's cyclo-cross
Representing Netherlands
World Championships
Silver medal – second place	2001 Tábor	Elite

Corine Stam-Dorland (née Dorland) (born 30 June 1973 in Loenen, Gelderland) was a Dutch amateur "Old School" Bicycle Motocross (BMX) racer whose prime competitive years were from 1981-1996. From 1996 to 2006 she was also an accomplished Mountain Bike (MTB) Cyclo-cross and Road Bike racer. Her nickname during her BMX career was "The Queen of BMX", largely for her nearly unbroken streak of a total of ten World Champions, several European Championships and an almost equal number of National championships from when she was eight years old until she was 21. She was to Holland and European BMX as a whole as Cheri Elliott was to American BMX. Indeed, her career was much longer than Elliott's garnering far more titles on the local, national and international level than her near contemporary American counterpart (Dorland is three years younger than Elliott). Dorland would go on to a respected MTB cross country (XC) racing career. In that sub-discipline Dorland would capture three national titles in MTB and earn a spot on Holland's 2000 Sydney, Australia Olympic team. She also went on to fulfill a prediction that many had made for her in another area. Because of her stunning physical beauty, she was also a model in her adult years concurrent with her MTB career. She appeared in many racing related advertisements. As with Elliott in the United States, many a male BMXer was sad to see her retire from the world of BMX.

== Racing career milestones ==
Note: Professional first are on the national level unless otherwise indicated.

- Started Racing: 1980 at six years old.
- First race result: She won.
- Sanctioning Body: Stichting Fietscross Nederland (SFN) (in English the Dutch Bicycle Motocross Foundation).
- First win (local): See "First race result".
- First sponsor:
- First National race result:
- First national win:
- Turned Professional: No Professional Career
- First Professional race result: See Above.
- First Professional win: See Above.
- Retired: 1996 at 23 years old. She started Mountain Bike Racing during her last year of BMX. Crossed over fully into Mountain Bike racing in 1997 and later into Cyclo-Cross and Road Racing. She left BMX because she had won everything.
- Height & weight at height of her career (1994): Ht:5'7" Wt:~130 lbs

=== Career factory and major bike shop sponsors ===
Note: This listing only denotes the racer's primary sponsors. At any given time a racer could have numerous ever changing co-sponsors. Primary sponsorships can be verified by BMX press coverage and sponsor's advertisements at the time in question. When possible exact dates are used.

==== Amateur ====
- Peugeot: 1982
- Vicuna Kuwahara (European division): 1983 – December 1986 "Kuwahara" means "Mulberry Meadows" in Japanese. The company is named after Sentaro Kuwahara who founded the company in 1916 in Osaka, Japan.
- AMEV Nederland b.v.: 1 January 1987 – December 1988. AMEV at the time Dorland was sponsored by them was a life insurance and banking firm. AMEV in Dutch stands for Algemeene Maatschappij tot Exploitatie van Verzekeringsmaatschappijen which in English literally translates to General Society To Develop Insurance Companies.
- Be-One: December 1988 – December 1989
- Royal Dutch KNWU: January 1990 – December 1990
- Sunn: December 1990 – December 1991
- GT (Gary Turner) Bicycles (European division): 1992–1996

==== Professional ====
- No professional career in BMX.

=== Career bicycle motocross titles ===
Note: Listed are District, State/Provincial/Department, Regional, National, and International titles in italics. Only sanctioning bodies that existed during the racer's career(s) are list. Depending on point totals of individual racers, winners of Grand Nationals do not necessarily win National titles. Series and one off Championships are also listed in block.

==== Amateur ====
Koninklijke Nederlandsche Wielren Unie (KNWU)

- 1983 8–9 Girls Holland National No.1
- 1985 10–11 Girls Holland National No.1
- 1986 12–13 Girls Holland National No.1
- 1987 12–13 Girls Holland National No.1
- 1988 14–15 Girls Holland National No.1

Nederlandse Fietscross Federatie (NFF)

National Bicycle Association (NBA)

- None

National Bicycle League (NBL)

- None

American Bicycle Association (ABA)

- 1992 17 & Over Girls Race of Champions Champion
- 1992 17 & Over Girls Grandnational Champion

United States Bicycle Motocross Association (USBA)

- None

International Bicycle Motocross Federation (IBMXF)***

- 1983 8-9 Girls World Champion
- 1984 10-11 Girls European Champion
- 1984 10-11 Girls World Champion
- 1985 10-11 Girls European Champion
- 1985 12-13 Girls World Champion*
- 1986 12-13 Girls European Champion
- 1986 12-13 Girls World Champion
- 1987 12-13 Girls European Champion
- 1987 14 Girls World Champion*
- 1988 14-15 Girls European Champion
- 1988 14-15 Girls World Champion*
- 1989 15 Girls European Challenge Cup VI Champion**
- 1989 17 Girls World Champion***/*
- 1990 17 Girls Bronze Medal World Champion
- 1991 17 Girls European Champion
- 1991 18 & Over Girls World Champion*
- 1992 17 & Over Girls International Indoor Leeuwarden Winner
- 1992 17 & Over Girls European Champion
- 1992 18 & Over Girls Silver Medal World Champion*
- 1993 18 & Over Girls European Champion
- 1993 18 & Over Girls World Champion*
- 1994 18 & Over Girls World Champion

*Dorland had an intervening birthday (June 30) between the European and World Championships held at the time in June and July respectively.
**This is not the same as the European Championships.

Fédération Internationale Amateur de Cyclisme (FIAC)***

***There wasn't a 16 girls class that year. Her streak of seven consecutive IBMXF World Championships was broken after this year and she didn't win the World Championship in her age group in 1990.

Union Cycliste Internationale (UCI)***

- None. After a remarkable career of being consistently Girls IBMXF World Champion she finished her BMX career by coming in Seventh in Elite women at the 1996 UCI World Championships in Brighton, England. She converted to Mountain Bike (MTB) Racing in 1997.

***Note: Beginning in 1991 the IBMXF and FIAC, the amateur cycling arm of the UCI, had been holding joint World Championship events as a transitional phase in merging which began in earnest in 1993. Beginning with the 1996 season the IBMXF and FIAC completed the merger and both ceased to exist as independent entities being integrated into the UCI. Beginning with the 1996 World Championships held in Brighton, England the UCI would officially hold and sanction BMX World Championships and with it inherited all precedents, records, streaks, etc. from both the IBMXF and FIAC.

==== Professional ====
- No professional career in BMX.

== BMX press magazine interviews and articles ==
- "Corine Dorland: Girl BMXer From Holland" Super BMX & Freestyle December 1987 Vol.14 No.12 pg.36
- "BMX's Fastest Female: Corine Dorland BMX Plus! December 1988 Vol.11 No.12 pg.39
- "Special Charme: Corinne Dorland/Melanie van Deene" Bicross & Skate Magazine Juillet/Aout (July/August) 1989 No.80 pg.65 A joint interview of Corine Dorland and fellow Dutch champion BMX racer Melaine van Deene by the French publication.

== BMX magazine covers ==
Note: Only magazines that were in publication at the time of the racer's career(s) are listed unless specifically noted.

Minicycle/BMX Action & Super BMX:

- None

Bicycle Motocross Action & Go:

- None

BMX Plus!:

- None

Total BMX

- None

Bicycles and Dirt:

- None

Bicross Magazine & Bicross & Skate Magazine

Snap BMX Magazine & Transworld BMX:

- None

Bicycles Today & BMX Today (the NBL official publication under two different names):

- None

ABA Action, American BMX'er, BMXer (the ABA official publication under three different names):

- None

USBA Racer (the USBA official publication):

- None

== Mountain Bike Career Record ==
- Started racing:' 1996
- Sub Discipline: Cross country (XC)
- First race result:
- Sanctioning body: UCI
- Retired: 2005

=== Career MTB factory and major Non-factory sponsors ===
Note: This listing only denotes the racer's primary sponsors. At any given time a racer could have numerous co-sponsors. Primary sponsorships can be verified by MTB press coverage and sponsor's advertisements at the time in question. When possible exact dates are given.

==== Amateur ====
No amateur status.

==== Professional ====
- VSB Batavus: 1997–1999
- Be-One: 2000–2001
- Power Plate/Bik: 2002
- Bik/Powerplate: 2003
- Bik/Gios: 2004

=== Career Mountain Bike Racing (MTB) titles ===
Note: Listed are Regional, National and International titles.

==== Amateur ====
No amateur status.

==== Professional ====
Koninklijke Nederlandsche Wielren Unie (KNWU)

- 1999, 2000, 2001 Dutch National Champion

Union Cycliste Internationale (UCI)

National Off Road Bicycle Association (NORBA)

- None

USA Cycling

=== Miscellaneous ===
Image of Corine in 2004 on the Powerplate/Bik team.

An April 2007 image.

It was predicted while she was in the middle of her BMX career that she could be a model because of her early developing beauty. Such predictions came true.

http://home.planet.nl/~vuurm001/dorland1.jpg

http://home.planet.nl/~vuurm001/dorland2.jpg

Corine posing in famous Sportsweek magazine advertisement.

== See also ==
- List of Dutch Olympic cyclists
