= Niels Wubben =

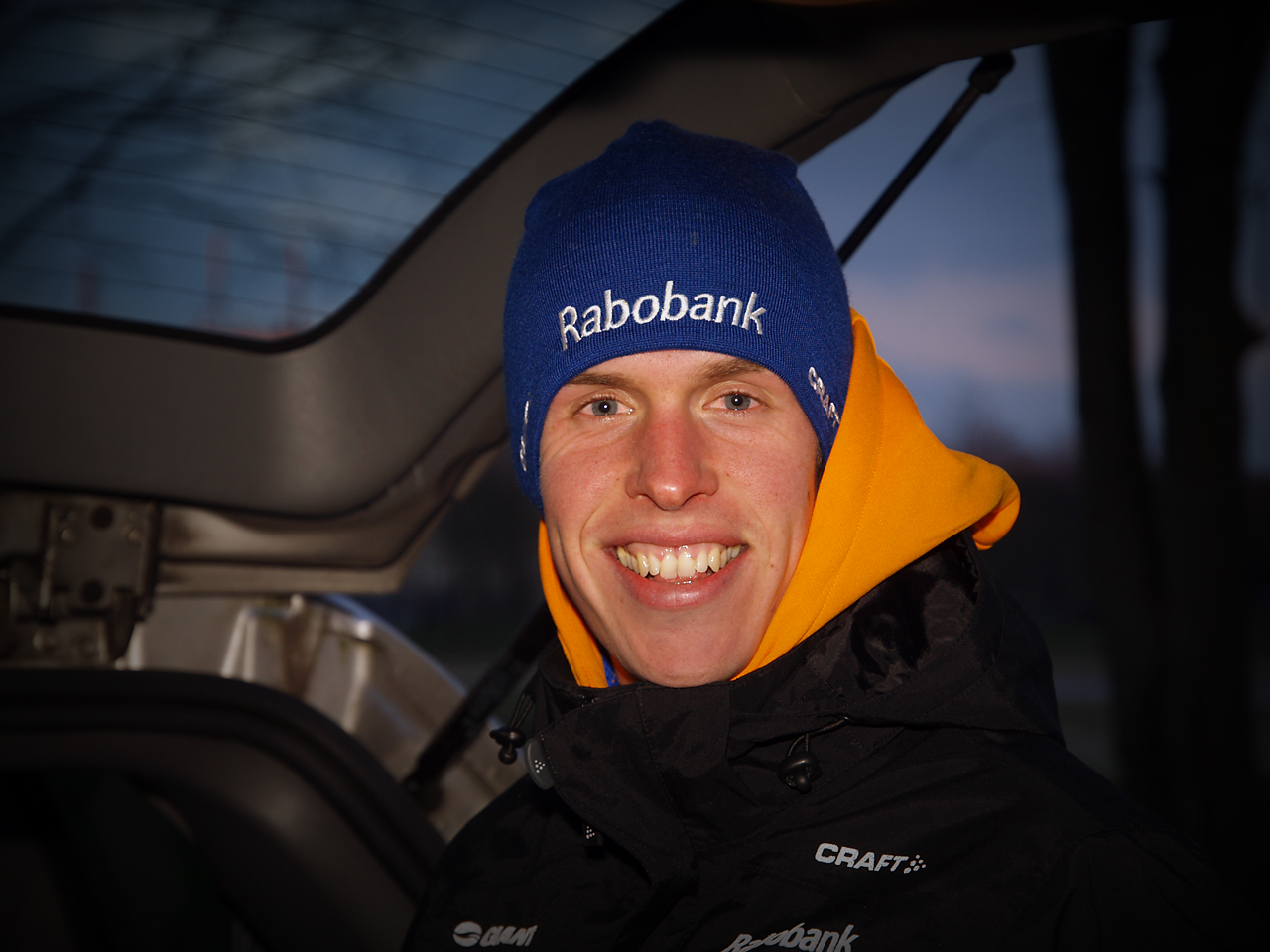

Personal information
- Born: 20 February 1988 (age 38) Naaldwijk, Netherlands

Cycling career
- Sport: Cycling
- Current team: Retired
- Disciplines: Cyclo-cross; Mountain biking; Road
- Role: Rider

Professional teams
- 2011–2012: Rabobank-Giant Offroad Team
- 2013: Rabobank Development Team
- 2014–2015: Telenet–Fidea

Niels Wubben (born 20 February 1988) is a Dutch former professional cyclo-cross cyclist. He represented his nation in the men's elite event at the 2016 UCI Cyclo-cross World Championships in Heusden-Zolder.

== Major results ==
=== Cyclo-cross ===
2011–2012
3rd National Championships
