= Bas van Dooren =

Dutch cyclist (born 1973)

Personal information
- Born: 25 August 1973 Oss, Netherlands
- Height: 172 cm (5 ft 8 in)
- Weight: 59 kg (130 lb)

Cycling career
- Sport: Cycling
- Discipline: Mountain biking

Professional teams
- Be One
- Specialized
- Bankgiroloterij-Batavus

Bas van Dooren (born 25 August 1973 in Oss) is a Dutch mountain biker. He competed in the Men's cross-country at the 2000 Summer Olympics, finishing 11th. In 1998 he finished second in the cross-country at the European Mountain Bike Championships. In 2000 he finished second overall of the 2000 UCI Mountain Bike World Cup

Van Dooren tested positive for EPO in 2002 from a test two days before the 2002 UCI Mountain Bike & Trials World Championships, where he finished 11th. He bought it in Germany via internet and replied that 'it was a gamble'. He was suspended for one year and ended his career.

== See also ==
- List of Dutch Olympic cyclists
