= Senna Feron =

Dutch cyclist

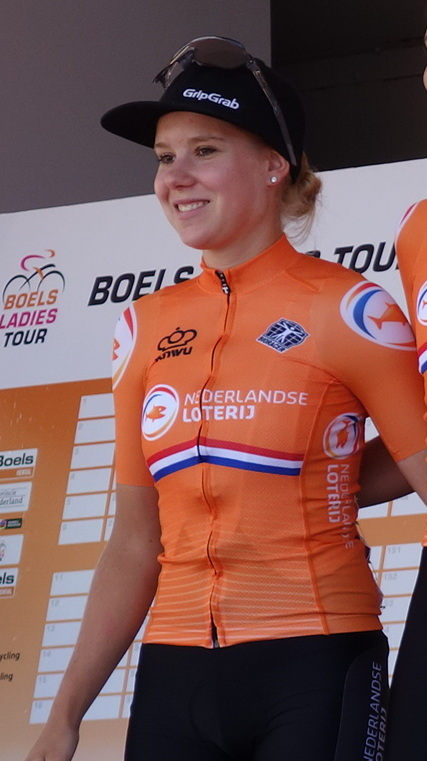
- Feron at the 2019 Boels Ladies Tour

Personal information
- Born: 26 October 1995 (age 30)

Cycling career
- Sport: Cycling
- Current team: Watersley Race & Development Team
- Discipline: Road
- Role: Rider

Amateur teams
- 2016–2018: Jos Feron Ladies Force
- 2019: WV Zeeuws-Vlaanderen
- 2021–: Watersley Race & Development Team

Professional team
- 2020: Biehler Krush Pro Cycling

Senna Feron (born 26 October 1995) is a Dutch racing cyclist, who currently rides for Dutch amateur team Watersley Race & Development Team.
