= Rudi van Houts =

Dutch cyclist (born 1984)

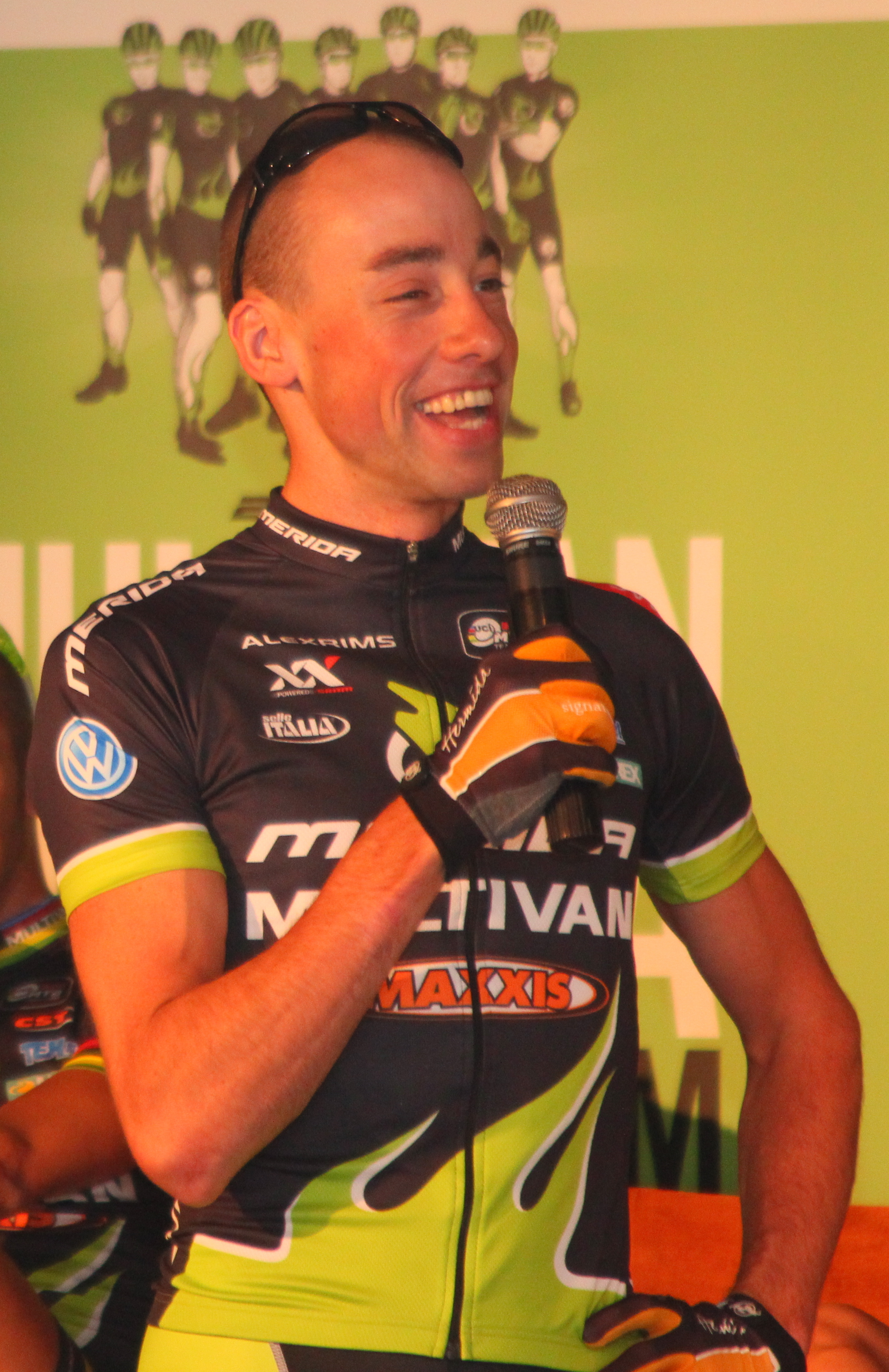
- Rudi van Houts in 2012

Personal information
- Full name: Rudolphus Antonie Cornelis van Houts
- Born: 16 January 1984 (age 42) Luyksgestel, the Netherlands
- Height: 1.77 m (5 ft 10 in)
- Weight: 64 kg (141 lb)

Cycling career
- Sport: Cycling
- Current team: Retired
- Disciplines: Mountain bike; Road
- Role: Rider
- Rider type: Cross-country (MTB)

Professional teams
- 2007–2008: Discovery Channel–Marco Polo
- 2009–2014: Multivan–Merida Team
- 2015–2016: Tempo Hoppenbrouwers Veldhoven

Rudolphus Antonie Cornelis “Rudi” van Houts (born 16 January 1984 in Luyksgestel) is a Dutch former professional road cyclist and mountain biker.

Van Houts finished 10th overall at the Giro del Capo in Cape Town in 2007, finishing 3:54 behind the winner. He finished 12th in the 2008 UCI World Mountain Bike Championships held in Val di Sole. Later that year he also qualified for the 2008 Summer Olympics in Beijing, where he finished in 34th. At the 2012 Summer Olympics he finished in 17th.

== Major results ==
2005
1st Cross-country, European Under-23 Mountain Bike Championships
2006
2nd Cross-country, European Under-23 Mountain Bike Championships
2007
10th Overall Giro del Capo
2009
3rd Mixed relay, European Mountain Bike Championships
2010
1st National Cross-country Championships
2011
1st National Cross-country Championships

== See also ==
- List of Dutch Olympic cyclists
