= 2019 European Mountain Bike Championships =

- Venue: (Portugal) Pampilhosa da Serra (Spain) Vielha (Norway) Kvam (Czech Republic) Brno (Italy) Lucca (France) Dunkirk
- Date: 4 May-15 December 2019
- Events: 15

The 2019 European Mountain Bike Championships was the 30th holding of the European Mountain Bike Championships, an annual mountain biking competition organized by the Union Européenne de Cyclisme (UEC). The championships comprised seven disciplines: downhill, cross-country cycling (XC), cross-country marathon (XCM), cross-country ultra-marathon, cross-country eliminator (XCE), trials, and beach race. The competitions for each discipline were held on different dates and at different venues, the only exceptions being cross-country and cross-country eliminator, which were contested on the same dates and in the same location.

== Dates and venues ==
- (Portugal) Pampilhosa da Serra : 4–5 May (downhill)
- (Spain) Vielha : 29 June (cross-country ultra-marathon)
- (Norway) Kvam : 6 July (cross-country marathon)
- (Czech Republic) Brno : 25–28 July (cross-country, cross-country eliminator)
- (Italy) Lucca : 4–6 October (trial)
- (France) Dunkirk : 15 December beach race

== Medal summary ==
=== Cross-country ===
Event	Gold	Silver	Bronze
Men	(Netherlands) Mathieu van der Poel	(Switzerland) Florian Vogel	(Netherlands) Milan Vader
Women	(Switzerland) Jolanda Neff	(Ukraine) Yana Belomoyna	(Germany) Elisabeth Brandau

=== Cross-country eliminator ===
Event	Gold	Silver	Bronze
Men	(France) Hugo Briatta	(France) Titouan Perrin-Ganier	(France) Lorenzo Serres
Women	(Italy) Gaia Tormena	(France) Coline Clauzure	(Spain) Magdalena Duran Garcia

=== Cross-country marathon ===
Event	Gold	Silver	Bronze
Men	(Portugal) Tiago Ferreira	(Italy) Samuele Porro	(Estonia) Peeter Pruus
Women	(Italy) Mara Fumagalli	(Slovenia) Blaža Klemenčič	(Sweden) Jennie Stenerhag

=== Cross-country ultra-marathon ===
Event	Gold	Silver	Bronze
Men	(Spain) Llibert Mill Garcia	(Spain) Joseba Albizu	(Spain) Daniel Carreño Nin De Cardona
Women	(Spain) Ramona Gabriel Batalla	(Spain) Silvia Roura Pérez	(Spain) Gisela Biguet Espuña

=== Downhill ===
Event	Gold	Silver	Bronze
Men	(France) Baptiste Pierron	(France) Benoît Coulanges	(Austria) David Trummer
Women	(Switzerland) Camille Balanche	(Slovenia) Monika Hrastnik	(Italy) Veronika Widmann

=== Trials ===
Event	Gold	Silver	Bronze
Men 26 inches	(United Kingdom) Jack Carthy	(France) Nicolas Vallée	(Spain) Sergi Llongueras
Men 20 inches	(Germany) Dominik Oswald	(Spain) Alejandro Montalvo	(Austria) Thomas Pechhacker
Women	(Germany) Nina Reichenbach	(France) Manon Basseville	(Spain) Vera Baron

=== Beachrace ===
Event	Gold	Silver	Bronze
Men	(Netherlands) Ivar Slik	(Belgium) Timothy Dupont	(Netherlands) Rick van Breda
Women	(Netherlands) Nina Kessler	(Netherlands) Riejanne Markus	(Netherlands) Tessa Neefjes
