= Fredrik Haraldseth =

Norwegian cyclist

Personal information
- Born: 23 February 1992 (age 34) Vadsø, Norway

Cycling career
- Sport: Cycling
- Discipline: Cyclo-cross
- Role: Rider

Fredrik Haraldseth (born 23 February 1992) is a Norwegian male cyclo-cross cyclist. He represented his nation in the men's elite event at the 2016 UCI Cyclo-cross World Championships in Heusden-Zolder.
