= 2018 UCI Mountain Bike World Cup =

Series of races for all-terrain bicyclists

- Date: March–August 2018

The 2018 Mercedes-Benz UCI Mountain Bike World Cup was a series of races in Olympic Cross-Country (XCO), Cross-Country Eliminator (XCE), and Downhill (DHI). Each discipline had an Elite Men and an Elite Women category. There were also under-23 categories in the XCO and junior categories in the DHI. The cross-country series and the downhill series each had seven rounds, some of which were held concurrently.

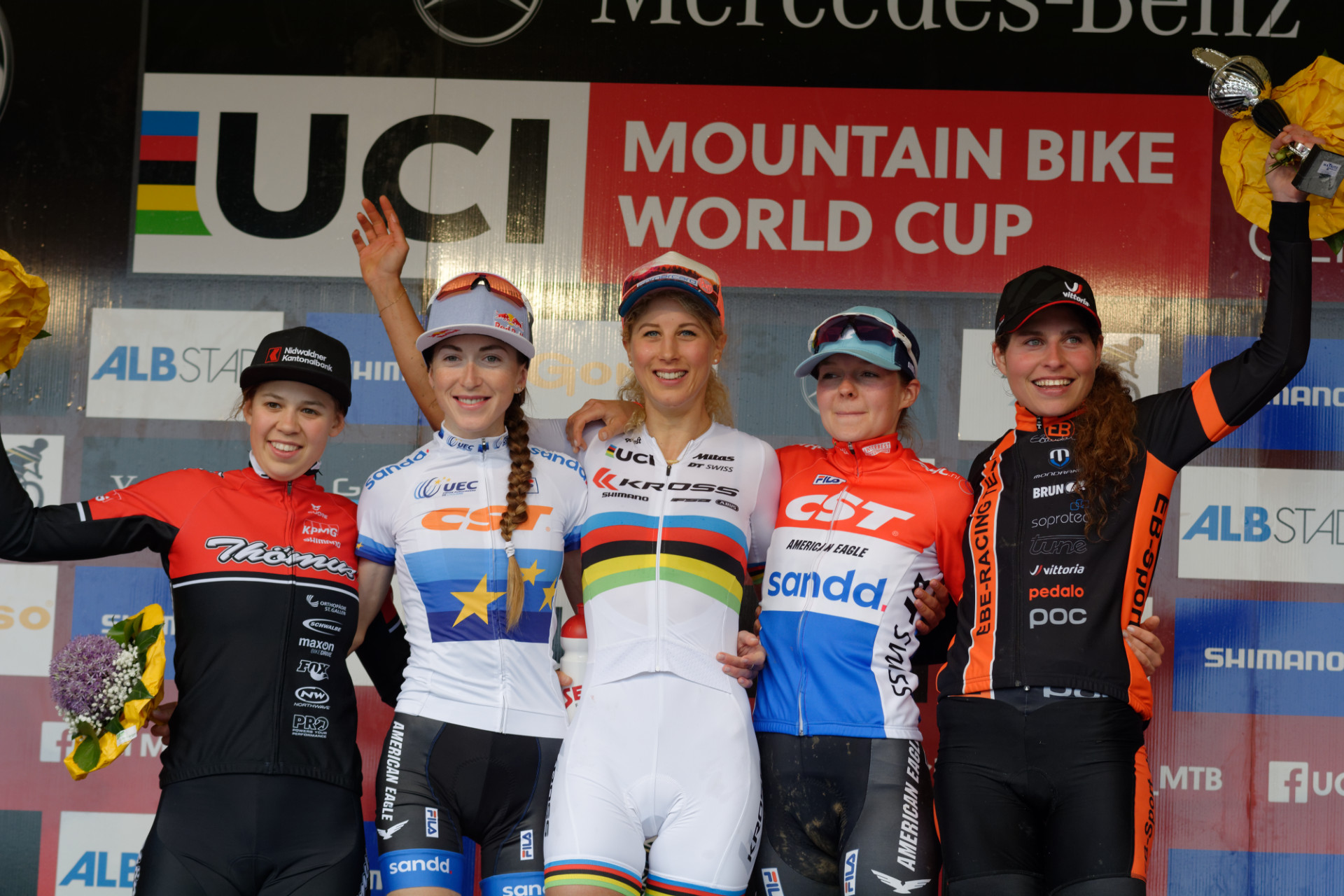
Women's cross country elite podium in Albstadt (from left): Alessandra Keller, Yana Belomoyna, Jolanda Neff, Anne Tauber, Elisabeth Brandau

The 2018 series returned to some classic venues, including Fort William, Nové Město, and Mont-Sainte-Anne. There was also a race in Stellenbosch, which was the first time a World Cup race had been held in South Africa since 2014.

== Cross-country ==
=== Elite ===
Date	Venue	Podium (Men)	Podium (Women)
10 March	(South Africa) Stellenbosch	(New Zealand) Sam Gaze	(Denmark) Annika Langvad
10 March	(South Africa) Stellenbosch	(Switzerland) Nino Schurter	(France) Pauline Ferrand-Prévot
10 March	(South Africa) Stellenbosch	(France) Maxime Marotte	(Netherlands) Anne Tauber
19–20 May	(Germany) Albstadt	(Switzerland) Nino Schurter	(Switzerland) Jolanda Neff
19–20 May	(Germany) Albstadt	(France) Stéphane Tempier	(Ukraine) Yana Belomoyna
19–20 May	(Germany) Albstadt	(Netherlands) Mathieu van der Poel	(Netherlands) Anne Tauber
26–27 May	(Czech Republic) Nové Město na Moravě	(Switzerland) Nino Schurter	(Denmark) Annika Langvad
26–27 May	(Czech Republic) Nové Město na Moravě	(New Zealand) Anton Cooper	(Switzerland) Jolanda Neff
26–27 May	(Czech Republic) Nové Město na Moravě	(France) Maxime Marotte	(France) Pauline Ferrand-Prévot
8 July	(Italy) Val di Sole	(Switzerland) Nino Schurter	(Poland) Maja Włoszczowska
8 July	(Italy) Val di Sole	(Italy) Gerhard Kerschbaumer	(Canada) Emily Batty
8 July	(Italy) Val di Sole	(Netherlands) Mathieu van der Poel	(Switzerland) Jolanda Neff
15 July	(Andorra) Vallnord	(Italy) Gerhard Kerschbaumer	(Norway) Gunn-Rita Dahle Flesjå
15 July	(Andorra) Vallnord	(Switzerland) Nino Schurter	(Switzerland) Jolanda Neff
15 July	(Andorra) Vallnord	(Netherlands) Mathieu van der Poel	(Canada) Emily Batty
12 August	(Canada) Mont-Sainte-Anne	(Switzerland) Mathias Flückiger	(Switzerland) Jolanda Neff
12 August	(Canada) Mont-Sainte-Anne	(Italy) Gerhard Kerschbaumer	(Denmark) Annika Langvad
12 August	(Canada) Mont-Sainte-Anne	(France) Titouan Carod	(Canada) Emily Batty
26 August	(France) La Bresse	(Switzerland) Nino Schurter	(Switzerland) Jolanda Neff
26 August	(France) La Bresse	(Italy) Gerhard Kerschbaumer	(Canada) Emily Batty
26 August	(France) La Bresse	(France) Maxime Marotte	(Denmark) Annika Langvad

=== Under 23 ===
Date	Venue	Podium (Men)	Podium (Women)
10 March	(South Africa) Stellenbosch	(Norway) Petter Fagerhaug	(Denmark) Malene Degn
10 March	(South Africa) Stellenbosch	(New Zealand) Ben Oliver	(Switzerland) Sina Frei
10 March	(South Africa) Stellenbosch	(France) Neïlo Perrin Ganier	(United Kingdom) Evie Richards
19–20 May	(Germany) Albstadt	(France) Joshua Dubau	(Switzerland) Sina Frei
19–20 May	(Germany) Albstadt	(France) Antoine Philipp	(United Kingdom) Evie Richards
19–20 May	(Germany) Albstadt	(Denmark) Jonas Lindberg	(Denmark) Malene Degn
26 May	(Czech Republic) Nové Město na Moravě	(Romania) Vlad Dascălu	(Switzerland) Sina Frei
26 May	(Czech Republic) Nové Město na Moravě	(Switzerland) Filippo Colombo	(Denmark) Malene Degn
26 May	(Czech Republic) Nové Město na Moravě	(South Africa) Alan Hatherly	(Italy) Marika Tovo
8 July	(Italy) Val di Sole	(Norway) Petter Fagerhaug	(Switzerland) Sina Frei
8 July	(Italy) Val di Sole	(France) Joshua Dubau	(United Kingdom) Evie Richards
8 July	(Italy) Val di Sole	(Romania) Vlad Dascălu	(Denmark) Malene Degn
15 July	(Andorra) Vallnord	(France) Joshua Dubau	(Switzerland) Sina Frei
15 July	(Andorra) Vallnord	(France) Antoine Philipp	(United Kingdom) Evie Richards
15 July	(Andorra) Vallnord	(Switzerland) Filippo Colombo	(Denmark) Malene Degn
12 August	(Canada) Mont-Sainte-Anne	(South Africa) Alan Hatherly	(Switzerland) Sina Frei
12 August	(Canada) Mont-Sainte-Anne	(United States) Christopher Blevins	(United Kingdom) Evie Richards
12 August	(Canada) Mont-Sainte-Anne	(Mexico) José Gerardo Ulloa	(Denmark) Malene Degn
26 August	(France) La Bresse	(Norway) Petter Fagerhaug	(Switzerland) Sina Frei
26 August	(France) La Bresse	(Spain) Jofre Cullell	(United Kingdom) Evie Richards
26 August	(France) La Bresse	(Denmark) Simon Andreassen	(Germany) Ronja Eibl

== Downhill ==
=== Elite ===
Date	Venue	Podium (Men)	Podium (Women)
21–22 April	(Croatia) Lošinj	(United States) Aaron Gwin	(France) Myriam Nicole
21–22 April	(Croatia) Lošinj	(United States) Luca Shaw	(United Kingdom) Rachel Atherton
21–22 April	(Croatia) Lošinj	(Australia) Dean Lucas	(United Kingdom) Tahnée Seagrave
2–3 June	(United Kingdom) Fort William	(France) Amaury Pierron	(United Kingdom) Tahnée Seagrave
2–3 June	(United Kingdom) Fort William	(France) Loris Vergier	(France) Myriam Nicole
2–3 June	(United Kingdom) Fort William	(Australia) Troy Brosnan	(United Kingdom) Rachel Atherton
9–10 June	(Austria) Leogang	(France) Amaury Pierron	(United Kingdom) Rachel Atherton
9–10 June	(Austria) Leogang	(United States) Aaron Gwin	(France) Myriam Nicole
9–10 June	(Austria) Leogang	(United Kingdom) Laurie Greenland	(Australia) Tracey Hannah
6–7 July	(Italy) Val di Sole	(France) Amaury Pierron	(United Kingdom) Tahnée Seagrave
6–7 July	(Italy) Val di Sole	(United Kingdom) Laurie Greenland	(United Kingdom) Rachel Atherton
6–7 July	(Italy) Val di Sole	(United Kingdom) Danny Hart	(Slovenia) Monika Hrastnik
13–14 July	(Andorra) Vallnord	(France) Loris Vergier	(United Kingdom) Tahnée Seagrave
13–14 July	(Andorra) Vallnord	(France) Amaury Pierron	(United Kingdom) Rachel Atherton
13–14 July	(Andorra) Vallnord	(New Zealand) Brook McDonald	(Australia) Tracey Hannah
10–11 August	(Canada) Mont-Sainte-Anne	(France) Loïc Bruni	(United Kingdom) Rachel Atherton
10–11 August	(Canada) Mont-Sainte-Anne	(Australia) Troy Brosnan	(United Kingdom) Tahnée Seagrave
10–11 August	(Canada) Mont-Sainte-Anne	(United Kingdom) Danny Hart	(Australia) Tracey Hannah
24–25 August	(France) La Bresse	(Belgium) Martin Maes	(United Kingdom) Rachel Atherton
24–25 August	(France) La Bresse	(United Kingdom) Gee Atherton	(United Kingdom) Tahnée Seagrave
24–25 August	(France) La Bresse	(New Zealand) Brook McDonald	(France) Myriam Nicole

=== Junior ===
Date	Venue	Podium (Men)	Podium (Women)
21–22 April	(Croatia) Lošinj	(France) Thibaut Dapréla	(Austria) Valentina Höll
21–22 April	(Croatia) Lošinj	(United Kingdom) Kade Edwards	(France) Nastasia Gimenez
21–22 April	(Croatia) Lošinj	(Australia) Kye A'Hern	(Norway) Mille Johnset
2–3 June	(United Kingdom) Fort William	(Australia) Kye A'Hern	(Austria) Valentina Höll
2–3 June	(United Kingdom) Fort William	(France) Thibaut Dapréla	(Latvia) Paula Zibasa
2–3 June	(United Kingdom) Fort William	(United Kingdom) Kade Edwards	(United States) Anna Newkirk
9–10 June	(Austria) Leogang	(Australia) Kye A'Hern	(Austria) Valentina Höll
9–10 June	(Austria) Leogang	(France) Thibaut Dapréla	(France) Nastasia Gimenez
9–10 June	(Austria) Leogang	(United Kingdom) Henry Kerr	(Sweden) Ottilia Johansson Jones
6–7 July	(Italy) Val di Sole	(France) Thibaut Dapréla	(Austria) Valentina Höll
6–7 July	(Italy) Val di Sole	(United Kingdom) Henry Kerr	(United States) Anna Newkirk
6–7 July	(Italy) Val di Sole	(Australia) Patrick Butler	(Norway) Mille Johnset
13–14 July	(Andorra) Vallnord	(France) Thibaut Dapréla	(Austria) Valentina Höll
13–14 July	(Andorra) Vallnord	(United Kingdom) Henry Kerr	(United States) Anna Newkirk
13–14 July	(Andorra) Vallnord	(Australia) Kye A'Hern	(Norway) Mille Johnset
10–11 August	(Canada) Mont-Sainte-Anne	(France) Thibaut Dapréla	(Austria) Valentina Höll
10–11 August	(Canada) Mont-Sainte-Anne	(United Kingdom) Kade Edwards	(United States) Samantha Soriano
10–11 August	(Canada) Mont-Sainte-Anne	(United Kingdom) Henry Kerr	(United States) Mazie Hayden
24–25 August	(France) La Bresse	(France) Thibaut Dapréla	(Austria) Valentina Höll
24–25 August	(France) La Bresse	(United Kingdom) Henry Kerr	(Latvia) Paula Zibasa
24–25 August	(France) La Bresse	(United Kingdom) Kade Edwards	(Norway) Mille Johnset

== World Cup standings ==
Standings after 7 of 7 events

=== Men ===
Cross-country
Pos	Athletes	Points
1.	(Switzerland) Nino Schurter	1861
2.	(Netherlands) Mathieu van der Poel	1355
3.	(France) Maxime Marotte	1242
4.	(Brazil) Henrique Avancini	1213
5.	(Italy) Gerhard Kerschbaumer	1154
6.	(Switzerland) Mathias Flückiger	993
7.	(New Zealand) Anton Cooper	978
8.	(Switzerland) Florian Vogel	962
9.	(Switzerland) Lars Förster	902
10.	(France) Titouan Carod	867

Under 23 cross-country
Pos	Athletes	Points
1.	(Norway) Petter Fagerhaug	390
2.	(France) Joshua Dubau	360
3.	(Switzerland) Filippo Colombo	280
4.	(France) Antoine Philipp	220
5.	(South Africa) Alan Hatherly	211

Downhill
Pos	Athletes	Points
1.	(France) Amaury Pierron	1178
2.	(United Kingdom) Danny Hart	884
3.	(Australia) Troy Brosnan	860
4.	(France) Loris Vergier	835
5.	(United Kingdom) Laurie Greenland	696
6.	(New Zealand) Brook MacDonald	692
7.	(France) Loïc Bruni	688
8.	(United States) Luca Shaw	649
9.	(United Kingdom) Gee Atherton	524
10.	(Australia) Connor Fearon	511

Junior downhill
Pos	Athletes	Points
1.	(France) Thibaut Dapréla	380
2.	(United Kingdom) Henry Kerr	192
3.	(United Kingdom) Kade Edwards	191
4.	(United Kingdom) Jamie Edmondson	186
5.	(Australia) Kye A'Hern	100

=== Women ===
Cross-country
Pos	Athletes	Points
1.	(Switzerland) Jolanda Neff	1930
2.	(Denmark) Annika Langvad	1743
3.	(Canada) Emily Batty	1305
4.	(Switzerland) Alessandra Keller	1275
5.	(Netherlands) Anne Tauber	1240
6.	(Poland) Maja Włoszczowska	1201
7.	(France) Pauline Ferrand-Prévot	1086
8.	(United States) Kate Courtney	1029
9.	(Norway) Gunn-Rita Dahle Flesjå	860
10.	(Germany) Elisabeth Brandau	856

Under 23 cross-country
Pos	Athletes	Points
1.	(Switzerland) Sina Frei	610
2.	(Denmark) Malene Degn	435
3.	(United Kingdom) Evie Richards	410
4.	(Italy) Marika Tovo	267
5.	(France) Lucie Urruty	183

Downhill
Pos	Athletes	Points
1.	(United Kingdom) Rachel Atherton	1476
2.	(United Kingdom) Tahnée Seagrave	1316
3.	(Australia) Tracey Hannah	1055
4.	(France) Myriam Nicole	810
5.	(Slovenia) Monika Hrastnik	771
6.	(France) Marine Cabirou	707
7.	(Switzerland) Emilie Siegenthaler	476
8.	(El Salvador) Mariana Salazar	436
9.	(United Kingdom) Katy Curd	419
10.	(France) Cécile Ravanel	375

Junior downhill
Pos	Athletes	Points
1.	(Austria) Valentina Höll	420
2.	(United States) Anna Newkirk	115
3.	(Latvia) Paula Zibasa	110
4.	(France) Nastasia Gimenez	90
5.	(Norway) Mille Johnset	85

== See also ==
- 2018 UCI Mountain Bike World Championships
