= Santa Cruz Syndicate =

Team information
- UCI code: SCB
- Registered: United States
- Founded: 2006 by Rob Roskopp
- Discipline: Downhill MTB
- Status: UCI Elite MTB Team
- Bicycles: Santa Cruz V10 Carbon
- Components: Shimano drivetrain and brakes, Fox suspension, Maxxis tires, OneUp components, Burgtec components, Reserve wheel systems, Chris King hubs & headsets
- Website: Team home page

Key personnel
- Team manager: Steve Peat

The Santa Cruz Syndicate (UCI team code: SCB), is a professional mountain bike racing team sponsored by Santa Cruz Bicycles, competing in the World Cup and World Championships, as well as national level events, in the downhill category. The Syndicate was founded in 2006.

Current rider line-up consists of UCI Men's Elite - Jackson Goldstone, Andreas Kolb - UCI Women's Elite - Nina Hoffmann, Ellie Hulsebosch UCI Men's Juinior - Felix Griffiths

== History ==
=== 2006 ===
In the Syndicate's inaugural year, Steve Peat delivered, winning the UCI Mountain Bike World Cup.

=== 2008 ===
2008 was Greg Minnaar's first year with the Syndicate, and he made his mark immediately, winning the UCI Mountain Bike World Cup, beating out Sam Hill and Gee Atherton. 2008 was also Josh Bryceland's first year with the Syndicate, and he won the UCI Junior Downhill World Championships.

=== 2009 ===
2009 was Steve Peat's year, as he won the UCI World Championships, after finishing 2nd four times before. Greg Minnaar finished in second place, which made the Syndicate the best-ranked UCI Downhill team, seconded by Madcatz Factory Team.

=== 2010 ===
2010 saw Minnaar finishing second in the downhill UCI Mountain Bike World Cup, and third in the UCI Mountain Bike & Trials World Championships.

=== 2014 ===
2014 was the year for Josh Bryceland. "Ratboy" won two World Cup races, and also won the overall DH UCI Mountain Bike World Cup, along with being the British DH National Champion.

=== 2017 ===
In his first season riding a 29-inch-wheeled bike, Greg Minnaar was within striking distance of the UCI Mountain Bike World Cup overall title until a disqualification in Mont Sainte-Anne and a mechanical in the final round in Val di Sole dropped him to third place; Loris Vergier joined him in the top five overall with a fifth-place finish.

== Palmarès ==
2006
1st DH, UCI Mountain Bike World Cup, Round 3, Willingen, Germany - Steve Peat
1st DH, UCI Mountain Bike World Cup, Series Overall - Steve Peat

2008
1st (United Kingdom) DH, British National Mountain Biking Championships - Steve Peat
1st (United Kingdom) DH, British National Mountain Biking Championships Junior - Josh Bryceland
2nd DH, UCI Mountain Bike World Cup, Round 1, Maribor, Slovenia - Steve Peat
3rd DH, UCI Mountain Bike World Cup, Round 2, Vallnord, Andorra - Greg Minnaar
1st DH, UCI Mountain Bike World Cup, Round 3, Fort William, Scotland - Greg Minnaar
3rd DH, UCI Mountain Bike World Cup, Round 3, FortWilliam, Scotland - Steve Peat
1st DH, UCI Mountain Bike World Cup, Round 4, Mont-Sainte-Anne, Canada - Greg Minnaar
2nd DH, UCI Mountain Bike World Cup, Round 5, Bromont, Canada - Greg Minnaar
3rd DH, UCI Mountain Bike World Cup, Round 5, Bromont, Canada - Steve Peat
1st DH, UCI Mountain Bike World Cup, Round 6, Canberra, Australia - Greg Minnaar
1st DH, UCI Mountain Bike & Trials World Championships Junior, Livigno, Italy - Josh Bryceland
1st DH, UCI Mountain Bike World Cup, Series Overall - Greg Minnaar

2009
1st DH, UCI Mountain Bike World Cup, Round 1, Pietermaritzburg, South Africa - Greg Minnaar
3rd DH, UCI Mountain Bike World Cup, Round 2, Pietermaritzburg, South Africa - Steve Peat
1st DH, UCI Mountain Bike World Cup, Round 2, La Bresse, France - Steve Peat
1st DH, UCI Mountain Bike World Cup, Round 3, Vallnord, Andorra - Steve Peat
3rd DH, UCI Mountain Bike World Cup, Round 3, Vallnord, Andorra - Greg Minnaar
1st DH, UCI Mountain Bike World Cup, Round 1, Maribor, Slovenia - Greg Minnaar
1st DH, UCI Mountain Bike World Cup, Round 3, Leogang, Austria - Greg Minnaar
2nd DH, UCI Mountain Bike World Cup, Round 5, Val Di Sole, Italy - Greg Minnaar
2nd DH, UCI Mountain Bike World Cup, Round 6, Windham, United States - Greg Minnaar

2010
2nd DH, UCI Mountain Bike World Cup, Series Overall - Greg Minnaar
3rd DH, UCI Mountain Bike & Trials World Championships, Mont-Sainte-Anne, Canada - Greg Minnaar

2011
1st (United Kingdom) DH, British National Mountain Biking Rd.3 - Josh Bryceland
2nd DH, UCI Mountain Bike World Cup, Mont Saint Anne, Canada - Josh Bryceland
2nd DH, UCI Mountain Bike World Cup, Pietermaritzburg, South Africa - Greg Minnaar
1st DH, UCI Mountain Bike World Cup, Fort William, Scotland - Greg Minnaar
1st DH, UCI Mountain Bike World Cup, La Bresse, France - Greg Minnaar

2012
1st DH, UCI Mountain Bike World Cup, Pietermaritzburg, South Africa - Greg Minnaar
1st DH, UCI Mountain Bike & Trials World Championships, Leogang, Austria - Greg Minnaar

2013
1st DH, UCI Mountain Bike & Trials World Championships, Pietermaritzburg, South Africa - Greg Minnaar
3rd DH, UCI Mountain Bike World Cup, Series Overall - Greg Minnaar

2014
1st South Africa National DH Championships Pietermaritzburg, South Africa - Greg Minnaar
3rd DH, UCI Mountain Bike World Cup, Round 1, Pietermaritzburg, South Africa - Greg Minnaar
2nd DH, UCI Mountain Bike World Cup, Round 4, Leogang, Austria - Greg Minnaar
2nd DH, UCI Mountain Bike World Cup, Round 2, Cairns, Australia - Josh Bryceland
1st DH, UCI Mountain Bike World Cup, Round 4, Leogang, Austria - Josh Bryceland
2nd DH, UCI Mountain Bike World Cup, Round 5, Mont Saint Anne, Canada - Josh Bryceland
1st DH, UCI Mountain Bike World Cup, Round 6, Windham, United States - Josh Bryceland
1st (United Kingdom) British National Mountain Biking Championships - Josh Bryceland
3rd DH, UCI Mountain Bike World Cup, Round 7, Meribel, France - Josh Bryceland
1st DH, UCI Mountain Bike World Cup Overall - Josh Bryceland
2nd DH, UCI Mountain Bike & Trials World Championships, Hafjell, Norway - Josh Bryceland

== 2008-2016 Team roster ==
Rider	Date of birth
Steve Peat (GBR)	June 17, 1974 (age 52)
Greg Minnaar (RSA)	November 13, 1981 (age 44)
Josh Bryceland (GBR)	March 23, 1990 (age 36)

== 2017-2020 Team roster ==
Rider	Date of birth
Greg Minnaar (RSA)	November 13, 1981 (age 44)
Luca Shaw (USA)	December 25, 1996 (age 29)
Loris Vergier (FRA)	July 5, 1996 (age 30)

== 2021 team roster ==
Rider	Date of birth
Greg Minnaar (RSA)	November 13, 1981 (age 44)
Luca Shaw (USA)	December 25, 1996 (age 29)
