= Jolanda Neff =

Swiss cyclist (born 1993)

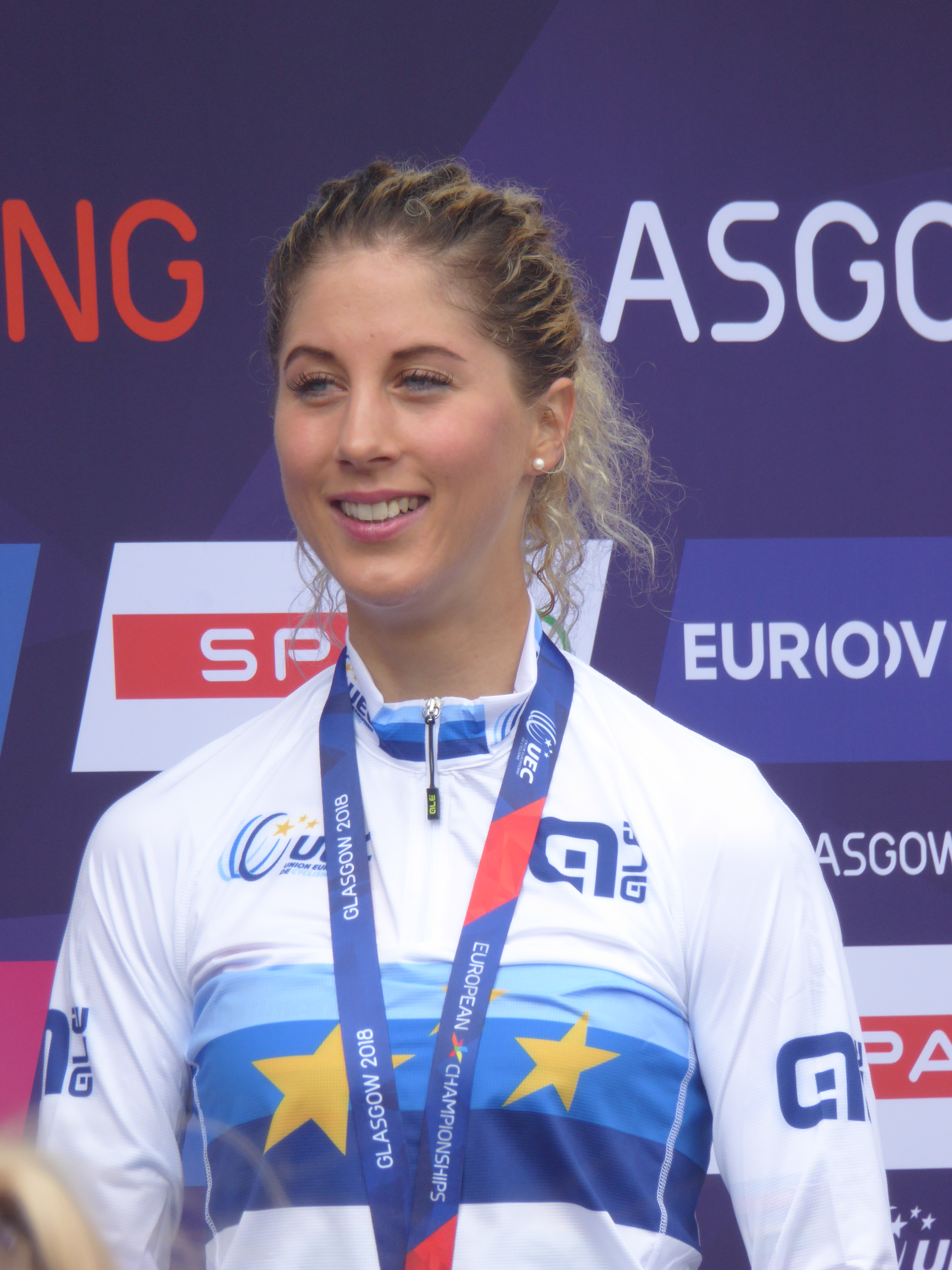
- Neff in 2018

Personal information
- Full name: Jolanda Neff
- Born: 5 January 1993 (age 33) Altstätten, Switzerland
- Height: 1.68 m (5 ft 6 in)
- Weight: 53 kg (117 lb)

Cycling career
- Sport: Cycling
- Current team: Cannondale Factory Racing
- Disciplines: Mountain biking (Cross-country); Cyclo-cross; Road
- Role: Rider
- Rider type: All-rounder

Professional teams
- 2012: Wheeler–IXS Team (off-road)
- 2013–2014: Giant Pro XC Team (off-road)
- 2013: Rabobank-Liv Giant (road)
- 2014–2016: Stöckli-Pro-Team (off-road)
- 2015–2016: Servetto Footon (road)
- 2017–2018: Kross Racing Team (off-road)
- 2018–2024: Trek Factory Racing (off-road)
- 2019–2024: Trek–Segafredo (road)
- 2025-: Cannondale Factory Racing

Major wins
- Cyclo-cross National Championships (2019) Mountain bike Olympic Games XC (2020) World XC Championships (2017) World Marathon Championships (2016) European XC Championships (2015, 2016, 2018, 2019) National XC Championships (2014, 2016–2018, 2020, 2021) XC World Cup (2014, 2015, 2018) 8 individual wins (2014, 2015, 2018, 2022) Road One-day races and Classics National Road Race Championships (2015, 2018)
Medal record
Women's mountain bike racing
Representing Switzerland
Olympic Games
Gold medal – first place	2020 Tokyo	Cross-country
World Championships
Gold medal – first place	2016 Laissac	Marathon
Gold medal – first place	2017 Cairns	Cross-country
Gold medal – first place	2017 Cairns	Team relay
Gold medal – first place	2018 Lenzerheide	Team relay
Gold medal – first place	2019 Mont-Sainte-Anne	Team relay
Silver medal – second place	2014 Hafjell	Team relay
Silver medal – second place	2019 Mont-Sainte-Anne	Cross-country
Silver medal – second place	2022 Les Gets	Cross-country
World Cup
Gold medal – first place	2014 Overall	Cross-country
Gold medal – first place	2015 Overall	Cross-country
Gold medal – first place	2018 Overall	Cross-country
Silver medal – second place	2019 Overall	Cross-country
European Championships
Gold medal – first place	2015 Chies d'Alpago	Cross-country
Gold medal – first place	2016 Huskvarna	Cross-country
Gold medal – first place	2016 Huskvarna	Team relay
Gold medal – first place	2018 Glasgow	Cross-country
Gold medal – first place	2019 Brno	Cross-country
Silver medal – second place	2013 Berna	Team relay
Silver medal – second place	2014 St. Wendel	Cross-country
Silver medal – second place	2015 Singen	Marathon
European Games
Gold medal – first place	2015 Baku	Cross-country
World Under-23 Championships
Gold medal – first place	2012 Saalfelden	Cross-country
Gold medal – first place	2013 Pietermaritzburg	Cross-country
Gold medal – first place	2014 Hafjell	Cross-country
European Under-23 Championships
Gold medal – first place	2012 Moscow	Cross-country
Silver medal – second place	2014 St. Wendel	Cross-country
European Junior Championships
Gold medal – first place	2011 Dohňany	Cross-country

Jolanda Neff (born 5 January 1993) is a Swiss cyclist, who primarily rides in the cross-country cycling and cyclo-cross disciplines, for the Cannondale Factory Racing team. She won the gold medal in the women's cross-country event at the 2020 Summer Olympics.

== Career ==
She was the overall winner of the UCI Mountain Bike World Cup in 2014 and 2015. She was triple Under-23 Mountain Bike World Champion (2012, 2013 and 2014). At the 2017 UCI World Championships in Cairns she became the elite world champion.

In June 2015, she won the first gold medal for Switzerland in the women's cross country event at the European Games in Baku. Later the same month, she went on to win the Swiss National Road Race Championships.

Neff won the UCI Mountain Bike Marathon World Championships in 2016 and Mountain Bike XCO World Championship in 2017. She also won the European Mountain Bike Championships in August 2018 at Cathkin Braes, just outside of Glasgow.

In October 2018, Neff announced that she would join the new Lidl–Trek team for 2019 in road racing, and Trek Factory Racing in mountain biking and cyclo-cross.

In July 2021, Neff won the gold medal in the women's cross-country event at the COVID-19 pandemic-delayed 2020 Summer Olympics. Her victory, along with her teammates Linda Indergand and Sina Frei winning the bronze and silver medals, marked the first all-Swiss Olympic podium since 1936 and the first time a nation has won all three medals in a cycling event since 1904.

== Personal life ==
Since 2018, she has been in a relationship with American downhill mountain biking racer Luca Shaw.

== Career achievements ==
=== Major results ===
==== Cyclo-cross ====
2015–2016
1st Madiswil
2017–2018
EKZ CrossTour

1st Bern
1st Meilen
2nd Eschenbach

2018–2019
1st National Championships
DVV Trophy

1st Baal

EKZ CrossTour

1st Meilen

UCI World Cup

5th Namur

2019–2020
1st Waterloo
UCI World Cup

2nd Waterloo

2021–2022
1st Waterloo
UCI World Cup

4th Waterloo

2022–2023
1st Hendersonville I
2025–2026
1st Hendersonville I
1st Hendersonville II
2nd National Championships
UCI World Cup

5th Namur

==== Road ====
2015
1st Road race, National Championships
4th Giro dell'Emilia
6th Trofeo Alfredo Binda
9th Road race, UCI World Championships
2016
1st Overall Tour de Pologne

1st Points classification
1st Active rider classification
1st Stages 1 & 3

3rd Trofeo Alfredo Binda
8th Road race, Olympic Games
10th La Flèche Wallonne
2018
1st Road race, National Championships
2020
4th Time trial, National Championships
2021
4th Overall Tour de Suisse
2022
5th Overall Tour de Suisse
2023
1st Overall Trofeo Ponente in Rosa

1st Points classification
1st Stage 3 & 4

2024
5th Overall Trofeo Ponente in Rosa

==== Mountain bike ====
2012
UCI World Championships

1st Under-23 cross-country
2nd Eliminator

1st Cross-country, UEC European Under-23 Championships
National Championships

1st Eliminator
1st Under-23 cross-country

BMC Racing Cup

2nd Basel–Muttenz

3rd Overall UCI Under-23 XCO World Cup
2013
UCI World Championships

1st Under-23 cross-country
2nd Eliminator

1st Eliminator, National Championships
2nd Team relay, UEC European Championships
BMC Racing Cup

3rd Gränichen

2014
UCI World Championships

1st Under-23 cross-country
2nd Team relay

National Championships

1st Cross-country
2nd Eliminator

1st Overall UCI XCO World Cup

1st Pietermaritzburg
1st Mont-Sainte-Anne
1st Méribel
3rd Albstadt

BMC Racing Cup

1st Buchs
1st Lugano–Tesserete
1st Gränichen
1st Lenzerheide
1st Basel–Muttenz

2nd Cross-country, UEC European Under-23 Championships
2015
UEC European Championships

1st Cross-country
2nd Marathon

1st Cross-country, European Games
1st Overall UCI XCO World Cup

1st Nové Město
1st Albstadt
1st Mont-Sainte-Anne
2nd Windham
2nd Trentino

BMC Racing Cup

1st Schaan
1st Lugano–Tesserete
1st Solothurn
1st Gränichen

2016
1st Marathon, UCI World Championships
UEC European Championships

1st Cross-country
1st Team relay

1st Cross-country, National Championships
1st Overall Swiss Epic (with Alessandra Keller)
2017
UCI World Championships

1st Cross-country
1st Team relay

1st Cross-country, National Championships
2018
1st Team relay, UCI World Championships
1st Cross-country, UEC European Championships
1st Cross-country, National Championships
1st Overall UCI XCO World Cup

1st Albstadt
3rd Val di Sole

Swiss Bike Cup

1st Gränichen
1st Andermatt
2nd Schaan

1st Internacionales Chelva
UCI XCC World Cup

2nd Albstadt
2nd Mont-Sainte-Anne
3rd Nové Město
3rd La Bresse

2019
1st Cross-country, UEC European Championships
UCI XCC World Cup

1st Vallnord
1st Val di Sole
2nd Albstadt
2nd Lenzerheide
3rd Nové Město

1st Tokyo 2020 Test Event
2nd Cross-country, UCI World Championships
2nd Overall UCI XCO World Cup

2nd Albstadt
2nd Vallnord
2nd Les Gets
2nd Val di Sole

2020
1st Cross-country, National Championships
Swiss Bike Cup

2nd Leukerbad

French Cup

2nd Alpe d'Huez

2021
1st Cross-country, Olympic Games
1st Cross-country, National Championships
Internazionali d'Italia Series

1st Andora

2nd Copa Catalana Internacional BTT
UCI XCC World Cup

3rd Leogang
3rd Lenzerheide

2022
1st Short track, National Championships
UCI XCO World Cup

1st Mont-Sainte-Anne
3rd Val di Sole

UCI World Championships

2nd Cross-country
3rd Marathon

3rd Overall UCI XCC World Cup

1st Nové Město
1st Mont-Sainte-Anne
3rd Lenzerheide

2023
2nd Cross-country, National Championships
2nd Haiming
Swiss Bike Cup

2nd Basel
3rd Gränichen

4th Cross-country, UEC European Championships
UCI XCO World Cup

4th Mont-Sainte-Anne
5th Snowshoe

2024
Swiss Bike Cup

2nd Gränichen
2nd Rivera

Shimano Super Cup

2nd Banyoles

UCI XCO World Cup

5th Mairiporã

2025
Shimano Super Cup

1st Banyoles
3rd La Nucia

Swiss Bike Cup

1st Rivera

Internazionali d'Italia Series

1st San Zeno di Montagna

1st Dornbirn
Ötztaler Festival

3rd Haiming

UCI XCO World Cup

4th Leogang

=== Awards and honours ===
Between 2014 and 2019, Neff was named as the Swiss female cyclist of the year at the Swiss Cycling Awards. She won the award for a seventh time in 2021, as all five Swiss female cyclists to ride, and win medals, at the 2020 Summer Olympics – Neff, Sina Frei, Linda Indergand, Marlen Reusser and Nikita Ducarroz – were recognised as joint winners.

Following her Olympic gold medal, a street in Thal was renamed as "Jolanda Neff Weg" in her honour in August 2021.
