= Mark Wallace (cyclist) =

Canadian mountain biker

Personal information
- Born: June 1, 1995 (age 31)

Cycling career
- Sport: Cycling
- Discipline: Downhill mountain biking

Professional teams
- 2013: Devinci Global Racing
- 2014: Devinci Global Racing
- 2015: Devinci Global Racing
- 2016: Devinci Global Racing
- 2017: Canyon Factory Racing DH
- 2018: Canyon Factory Downhill Team
- 2019: Canyon Factory Downhill Team
- 2020: Canyon Collective Factory Team

Mark Wallace (born June 1, 1995) is a professional downhill mountain biker from Canada. Wallace began his career at Devinci Global Racing alongside fellow Canadian, Steve Smith.
