= Loris Vergier =

French mountain biker

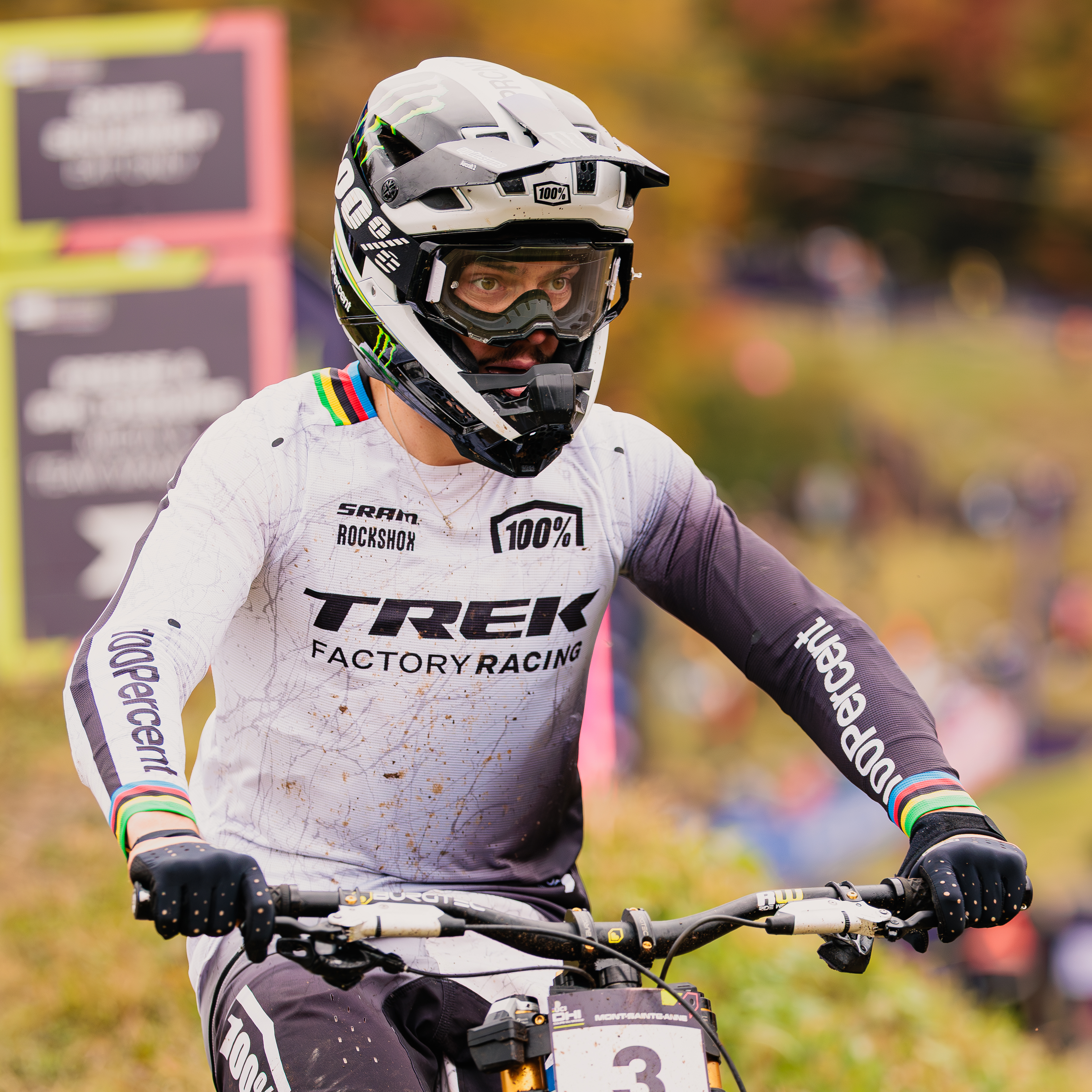

Personal information
- Born: 7 May 1996 (age 30) Cagnes-sur-Mer, France

Cycling career
- Sport: Cycling
- Current team: COMMENCAL / MUC-OFF by Riding Addiction
- Discipline: Downhill mountain biking
- Role: Rider

Professional teams
- Lapierre Bikes
- Specialized Bicycle Components
- Santa Cruz Syndicate
- Trek Factory Racing
- COMMENCAL / MUC-OFF by Riding Addiction

Major wins
- 2014 UCI Mountain Bike & Trials World Championships
Medal record
Men's mountain bike racing
World Championships
Gold medal – first place	2014 Hafjell	Downhill
Gold medal – first place	2024 Vallnord	Downhill

Loris Vergier (born 7 May 1996) is a French downhill mountain bike rider. As a Junior, he won first place at the 2014 UCI Downhill Mountain World Championships.

== Career ==
Vergier began racing for Lapierre Bikes as a junior in 2013. The following year he won both the Junior world cup overall as well as the Junior World Championships in Hafjell, Norway. In 2015, he moved up to the elite category and took third place at the UCI world cup round in Windham, U.S.

In 2016 the Lapierre team switched to specialized bikes. Vergier finished the UCI World Cup season in seventh place. His best result of the 2016 season was a second place in Leogang, Austria.

The following year, he left the team to join Greg Minnaar and Luca Shaw at the Santa Cruz Syndicate after Steve Peat announced his retirement from professional downhill racing and Josh Bryceland announced that he would no longer be racing for the syndicate.

In 2021 Loris joined the Trek factory Racing team.

In 2025 Loris joined the COMMENCAL / MUC-OFF by Riding Addiction team.
