= Jake Watson =

American cyclist (1973–1999)

Jake Watson (December 5, 1973 – March 12, 1999) was an American cyclist. He assisted in the development of the sport of downhill mountain biking, making contributions to industry marketing, bike design and riding techniques.

Known for his massive frame, Watson was given the nickname "Earthquake" early into his cycling, carrying the name to the top on podiums throughout the United States, Canada and Europe. Watson lost his life during downhill practice for California's Keysville Classic as a result of injuries sustained in a crash. As a tribute to Watson's contributions, Marin Bikes released a frame series in 1999, entitled "Quake."

== Sources ==
- Scientific American Building the Elite Athlete; Scientific American; Lyons Press 978-1-59921-116-9 pp. 129
- Mountain Biking Injuries, An Update: Authors: Kronisch R.L.1; Pfeiffer R.P.2; Sports Medicine, Volume 32, Number 8, 1 August 2002, pp. 523–537 15) Publisher: Adis International
- The Complete Idiots Guide to Cycling: Publisher: Complete Idiots Guide, ISBN 0-02-862929-9.
- Google books
- The Quotable Cyclist: Great Moments of Bicycling Wisdom, Inspiration and Humor; Bill Strickland; Break Away Books; ISBN 1-55821-563-8, pp. 75, 188
- The Bicycling Training Journal: A Daily Dose of Motivation, Training Tips; 1-57954-935-7
