= Gerhard Kerschbaumer =

Italian cyclist (born 1991)

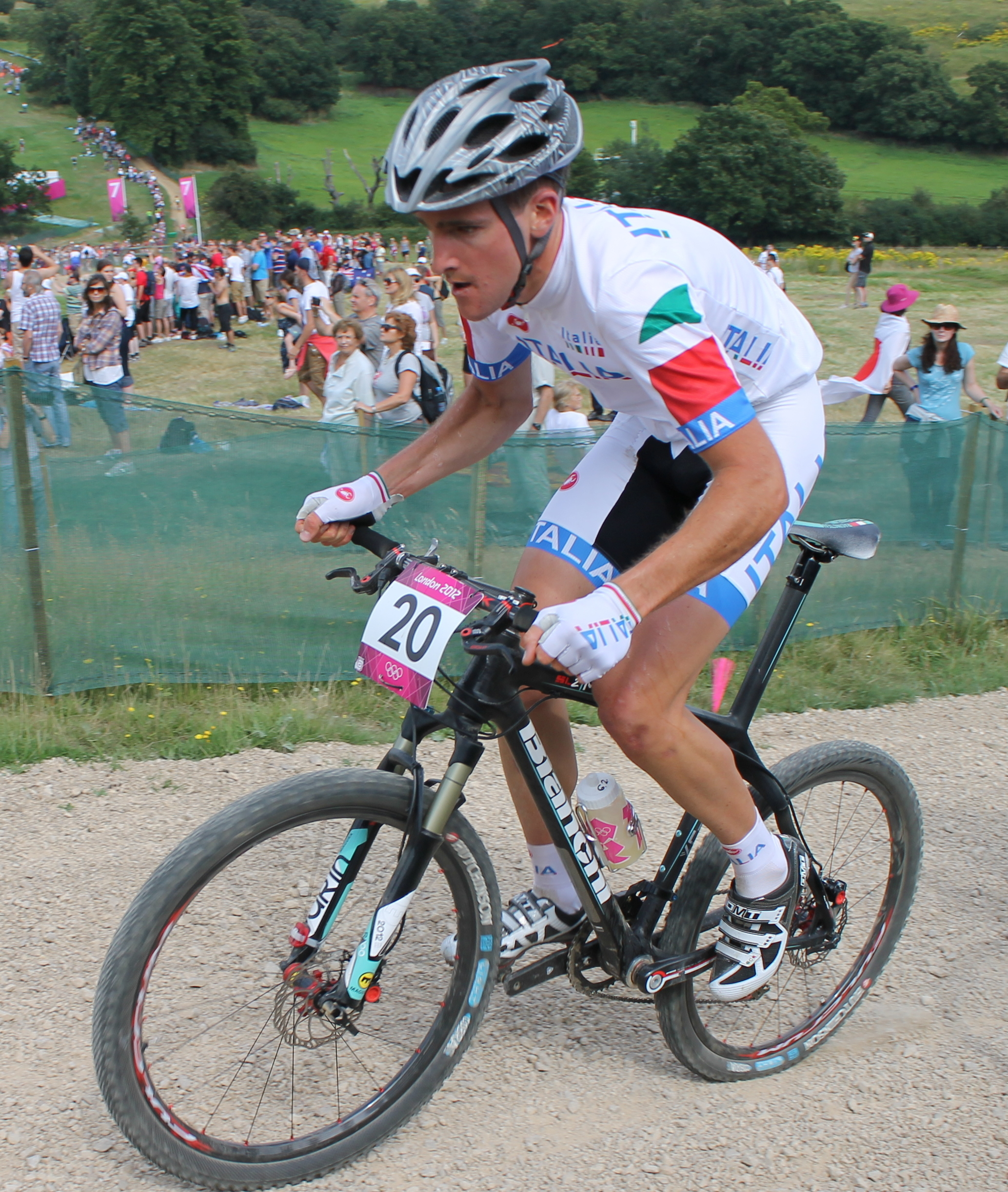
- Kerschbaumer at the 2012 Summer Olympics

Personal information
- Born: 19 July 1991 (age 35) Bressanone, Italy
- Height: 1.84 m (6 ft 0 in)
- Weight: 69 kg (152 lb)

Cycling career
- Sport: Cycling
- Current team: Torpado – Ursus
- Discipline: Mountain bike racing
- Role: Rider

Major wins
- Mountain bike National XC Championships (2017, 2019, 2022) XC World Cup 1 individual win (2018)
Medal record
Representing Italy
Men's mountain bike racing
World Championships
Silver medal – second place	2018 Lenzerheide	Cross-country

Gerhard Kerschbaumer (born 19 July 1991) is an Italian cross-country mountain biker. At the 2012 Summer Olympics, he competed in the cross-country race at Hadleigh Farm, finishing in 13th place.

== Major results ==
2008
1st Cross-country, National Junior Championships
2009
1st Cross-country, National Junior Championships
2011
1st Overall UCI Under-23 World Cup

1st Pietermaritzburg
1st Mont-Sainte-Anne
1st Windham
1st Nové Město
1st Val di Sole
2nd Dalby Forest

1st Cross-country, National Under-23 Championships
2012
1st Cross-country, National Under-23 Championships
2nd Overall UCI Under-23 World Cup

1st Val d'Isère
2nd Mont-Sainte-Anne
2nd Pietermaritzburg

2013
UCI World Championships

1st Team relay
1st Under-23 Cross-country

1st Team relay, UEC European Championships
1st Cross-country, National Under-23 Championships
2017
1st Cross-country, National Championships
Swiss Bike Cup

2nd Basel
2nd Lugano

3rd Team relay, UEC European Championships
UCI XCO World Cup

3rd Mont-Sainte-Anne

2018
UCI XCO World Cup

1st Vallnord
2nd Val di Sole
2nd Mont-Sainte-Anne
2nd La Bresse

Internazionali d'Italia Series

1st Pineto
1st Chies d'Alpago

Swiss Bike Cup

1st Lugano

2nd Cross-country, UCI World Championships
UCI XCC World Cup

3rd Vallnord

2019
1st Cross-country, National Championships
Internazionali d'Italia Series

1st Pineto
1st La Thuile
3rd Andora

Swiss Bike Cup

1st Andermatt
2nd Basel

UCI XCO World Cup

2nd Les Gets

2021
Internazionali d'Italia Series

1st Valle di Casies

2022
1st Cross-country, National Championships
