= Kye A'Hern =

Australian mountain bike racer (born 2001)

Personal information
- Born: 24 May 2001 (age 25) Canberra, Australia

Cycling career
- Sport: Cycling
- Current team: UR NS Bikes Factory Team
- Discipline: Downhill mountain biking
- Role: Rider

Professional teams
- ?: Canyon Collective Factory Team
- ?: UR NS Bikes Factory Team

Major wins
- Junior Men's Downhill World Championships
Medal record
Gold medal – first place	2019	Junior downhill

Kye A'Hern (born 24 May 2001) is an Australian professional downhill mountain bike racer. In 2019, he won the Junior Men's Downhill Mountain biking World championships in Mont-Sainte-Anne, Canada.

== Career ==
Triathlon Olympian and 2000 Commonwealth Games gold medalist Nick Ahern built his career through speed walking. In 2000, he found that cross-country cycling
