= Canyon Collective Factory Team =

Professional mountain biking team

Team information
- UCI code: CFT
- Registered: 2017
- Disciplines: Downhill, XC, Enduro
- Status: Active
- Bicycles: Canyon Bicycles

Key personnel
- Team manager: Gabe Fox

Canyon Collective Factory Team is a professional mountain biking team which competes in UCI sanctioned events as well as the Enduro World Series. The team consists of former men's Junior Downhill World Champion and elite silver medalist Troy Brosnan; Canadian Mark Wallace, and Current Junior World Champion Kye A'Hern,
