= Petter Fagerhaug =

Norwegian cyclist

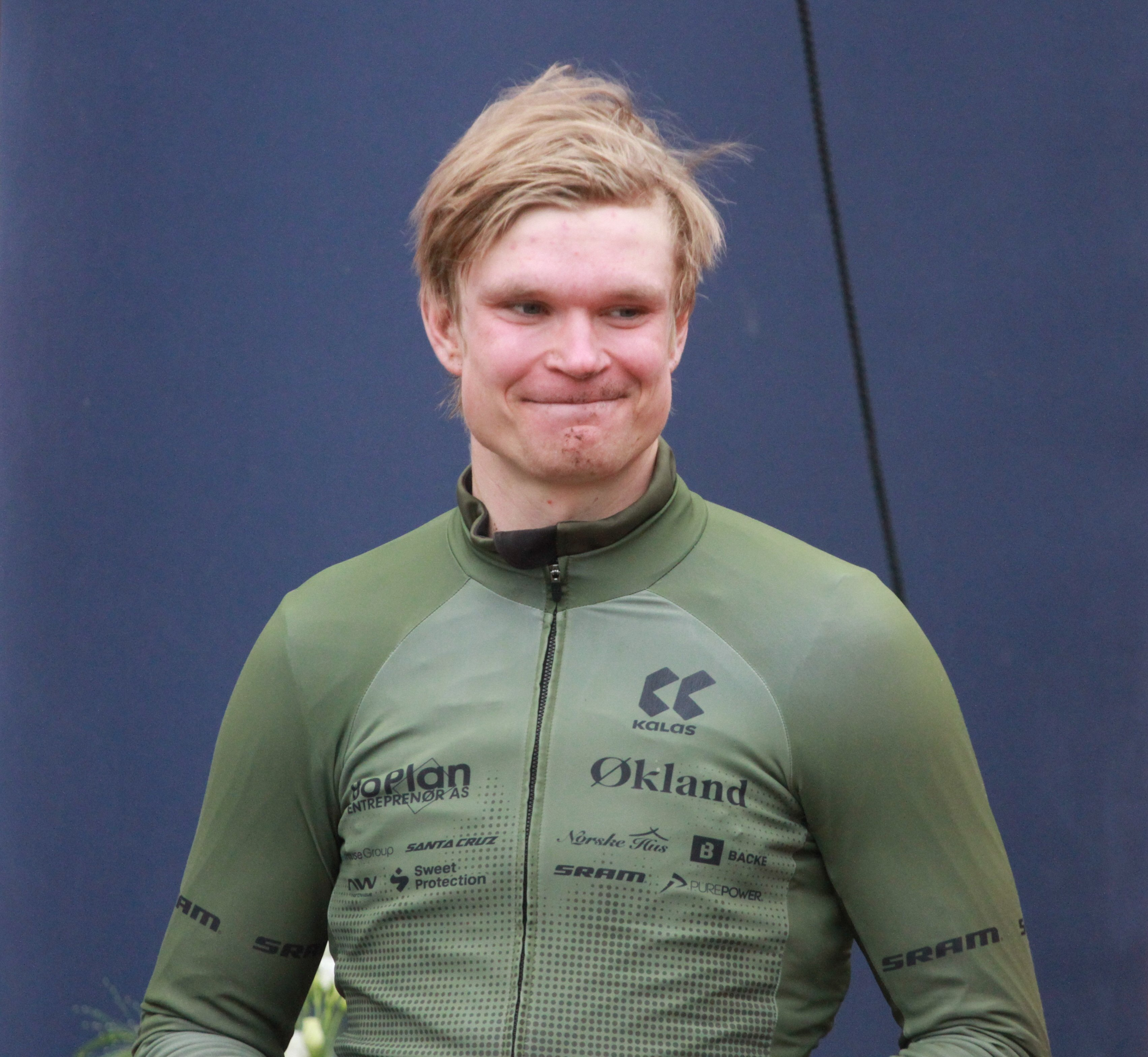
- Petter Fagerhaug

Personal information
- Born: 29 September 1997 (age 29) Gjerdrum, Norway

Cycling career
- Sport: Cycling
- Disciplines: Cross-country; Road
- Role: Rider

Amateur teams
- 2015: Lillehammer CK Junior
- 2016–2018: Lillehammer CK

Professional team
- 2019–2020: Alpecin–Fenix

Petter Fagerhaug (born 29 September 1997) is a Norwegian cyclist, who most recently rode for UCI ProTeam Alpecin–Fenix. He primary competes in cross-country mountain biking, but also occasionally on the road.

== Major results ==
2016
1st Cross-country, National Mountain Bike Championships
2017
1st Cross-country, National Mountain Bike Championships
3rd Overall UCI Under-23 Mountain Bike World Cup

1st Nové Město

2018
1st Overall UCI Under-23 Mountain Bike World Cup

1st La Bresse
1st Val di Sole
1st Stellenbosch

1st Cross-country, National Mountain Bike Championships
