= BMC Racing Cup =

The BMC Racing Cup is a multi-round mountain bike racing series with different venues in Switzerland. The discipline in which national and international riders compete is the Olympic Cross-country (XCO).

In 2014 Lenzerheide hosted one of the races of the BMC Racing Cup, and the same track was used again for the third round of the 2015 UCI Mountain Bike World Cup.

== Calendar ==
Dates and venues from 2009 to 2015 are:

=== 2009 season ===
- Round #1 Lugano - Tesserete (April 18).
- Round #2 Solothurn (May 9).
- Round #3 Gränichen (June 7).
- Round #4 Winterthur (June 21).
- Round #5 Engelberg - Titlis (June 28).
- Round #6 Plaffeien (July 19).
- Round #7 Bern (August 9).
- Round #8 Muttenz (August 23).
back to the beginning

=== 2010 season ===
- Round #1 Buchs (March 28).
- Round #2 Lugano - Tesserete (April 11).
- Round #3 Solothurn (May 8).
- Round #4 Plaffeien (May 30).
- Round #5 Champéry (June 6).
- Round #6 Engelberg - Titlis (June 20).
- Round #7 Flims (July 3).
- Round #8 Muttenz (August 22).
back to the beginning

=== 2011 season ===
- Round #1 Schaan (March 27).
- Round #2 Lugano - Tesserete (April 10).
- Round #3 Solothurn (May 7).
- Round #4 Gränichen (June 5).
- Round #5 Engelberg - Titlis (June 12).
- Round #6 Chur (June 26).
- Round #7 Muttenz (August 28).
back to the beginning

=== 2012 season ===
- Round #1 Buchs (April 1).
- Round #2 Lugano - Tesserete (April 22).
- Round #3 Solothurn (May 5).
- Round #4 Gränichen (June 17).
- Round #5 Davos (July 15).
- Round #6 Basel - Muttenz (August 26).
back to the beginning

=== 2013 season ===
- Round #1 Schaan (April 7).
- Round #2 Lugano - Tesserete (April 14).
- Round #3 Solothurn (May 4).
- Round #4 Gränichen (June 9).
- Round #5 Davos (August 4).
- Round #6 Basel - Muttenz (August 24).
back to the beginning

=== 2014 season ===
- Round #1 Buchs (March 23).
- Round #2 Lugano - Tesserete (April 6).
- Round #3 Solothurn (May 10).
- Round #4 Gränichen (June 15).
- Round #5 Montsevelier (July 6).
- Round #6 Lenzerheide (July 13).
- Round #7 Basel - Muttenz (August 17).
back to the beginning

=== 2015 season ===
- Round #1 Schaan (April 12).
- Round #2 Lugano - Tesserete (April 26).
- Round #3 Solothurn (May 9).
- Round #4 Gränichen (June 7).
- Round #5 Yverdon (June 28).
- Round #6 Montsevelier (July 12).
- Round #7 Basel - Muttenz (August 16).
back to the beginning

== Highlights ==
=== 2013 Season on YouTube ===
- Round #1 Schaan (April 7).
- Round #2 Lugano - Tesserete (April 14).
- Round #3 Solothurn (May 4).
- Round #4 Gränichen (June 9).
  - Men Elite Video on YouTube
  - Women Elite Video on YouTube
- Round #5 Davos (August 4).
- Round #6 Basel - Muttenz (August 24).
  - Men Elite Video on YouTube
  - Women Elite Video on YouTube
back to the beginning

=== 2014 Season on YouTube ===
- Round #1 Buchs (March 23).
  - Men Elite Video on YouTube
  - Women Elite Video on YouTube
- Round #2 Lugano - Tesserete (April 6).
- Round #3 Solothurn (May 10).
  - Men Elite Video on YouTube
  - Women Elite Video on YouTube
- Round #4 Gränichen (June 15).
  - Men Elite Video on YouTube
  - Women Elite Video on YouTube
- Round #5 Montsevelier (July 6).
  - Men Elite Video on YouTube
- Round #6 Lenzerheide (July 13).
  - Building the track Video on YouTube
  - Race test Video on YouTube
- Round #7 Basel - Muttenz (August 17).
  - Men Elite Video on YouTube
  - Women Elite Video on YouTube
back to the beginning

=== 2015 Season on YouTube ===
- Round #1 Schaan (April 12).
- Round #2 Lugano - Tesserete (April 26).
  - Men Elite Video on YouTube
  - Women Elite Video on YouTube
- Round #3 Solothurn (May 9).
  - Men Elite Video on YouTube
  - Women Elite Video on YouTube
- Round #4 Gränichen (June 7).
  - Men Elite Video on YouTube
  - Women Elite Video on YouTube
- Round #5 Yverdon (June 28).
  - Men Elite Video on YouTube
- Round #6 Montsevelier (July 12).
- Round #7 Basel - Muttenz (August 16).
back to the beginning
