= Tahnée Seagrave =

British cyclist

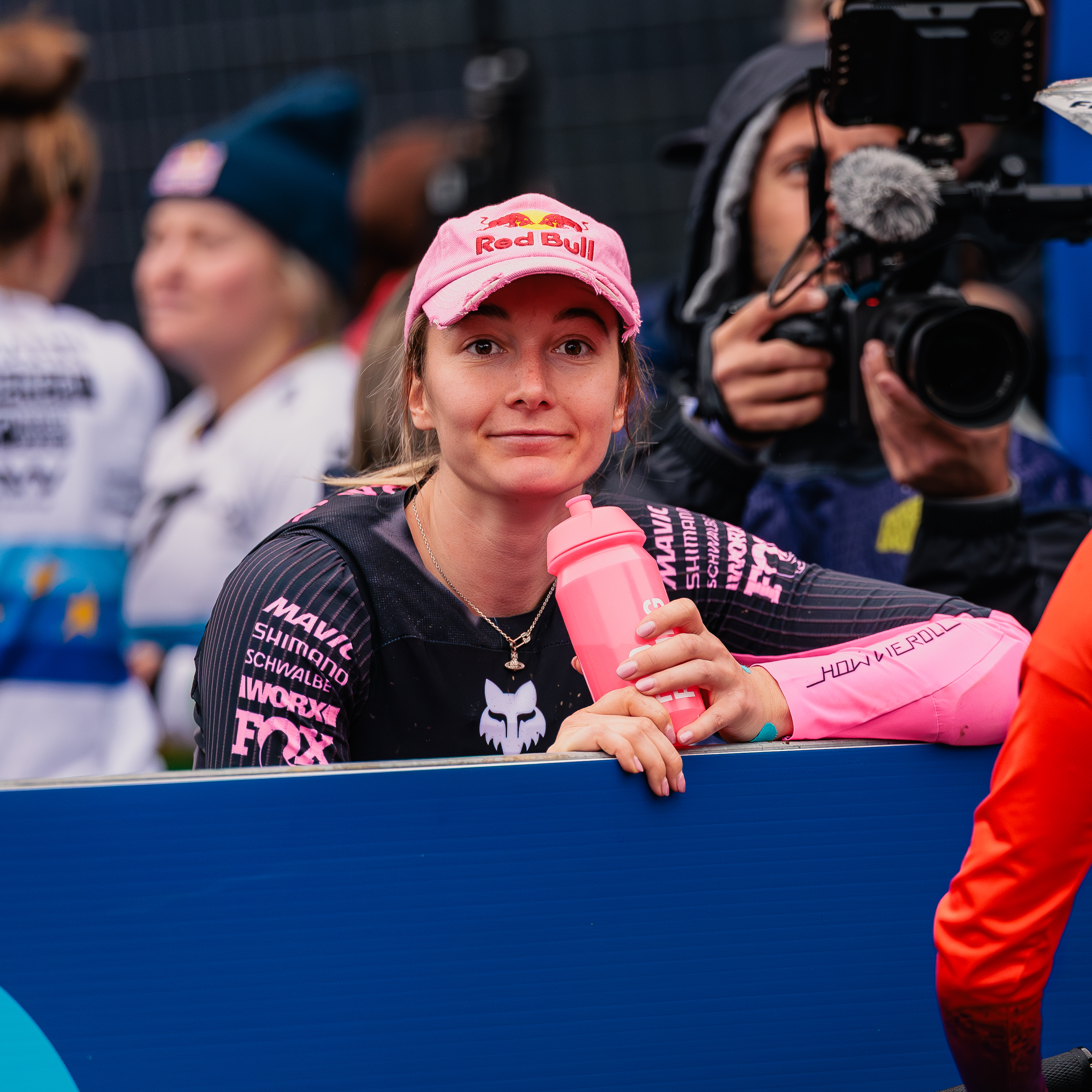

Personal information
- Born: 15 June 1995 (age 31) London, England

Cycling career
- Sport: Cycling
- Current team: Orbea FMD Racing
- Discipline: Downhill mountain biking
- Role: Rider
Medal record
Women's mountain bike racing
Representing Great Britain
World Championships
Gold medal – first place	2013 Pietermaritzburg	Junior downhill
Silver medal – second place	2019 Mont-Sainte-Anne	Downhill
Silver medal – second place	2018 Lenzerheide	Downhill
Bronze medal – third place	2014 Hafjell	Downhill
Bronze medal – third place	2024 Vallnord	Downhill

Tahnée Danyaela Seagrave (born 15 June 1995) is a British athlete, competing in the sport of downhill mountain biking.

She participated at the 2018 UCI Mountain Bike World Championships in round 5 held in Andorra, achieving a second-place position on the podium. In 2020, Seagrave suffered injuries, including breaking several bones, before the start of the season and was not able to compete. She is sponsored by Red Bull, Fox, Orbea, and others.

== Personal life ==
Seagrave was born in South London, but moved to Saint-Jean-d'Aulps, France with her parents at the age of eight. After seeing professional riders staying in her parents chalet, Seagrave became interested in mountain biking and started to compete.

Her brother, Kaos Seagrave, is also a mountain biker.

Seagrave currently lives in Wales.

== Results ==
UCI Downhill World Championships
Season	Venue	Category	Position
2012	Leogang	Junior Women	2nd
2013	Pietermaritzburg	Junior Women	1st
2014	Hafjell / Lillehammer	Elite Women	3rd
2018	Lenzerheide	Elite Women	2nd
2019	Mont-Sainte-Anne	Elite Women	2nd

UCI-DHI World Cups
Category	Season	Venue	Position	Overall Standings
Elite Women	2015	Fort William	2nd	
Elite Women	2015	Leogang	2nd	
Elite Women	2016	Lourdes	2nd	
Elite Women	2016	Leogang	2nd	
Elite Women	2016	Lenzerheide	2nd	
Elite Women	2017	Lourdes	3rd	2nd
Elite Women	2017	Leogang	1st	2nd
Elite Women	2017	Vallnord	2nd	2nd
Elite Women	2017	Mont-Sainte-Anne	1st	2nd
Elite Women	2017	Val di Sole	1st	2nd
Elite Women	2018	Lošinj	3rd	2nd
Elite Women	2018	Fort William	1st	2nd
Elite Women	2018	Val di Sole	1st	2nd
Elite Women	2018	Vallnord	1st	2nd
Elite Women	2018	Mont-Sainte-Anne	2nd	2nd
Elite Women	2018	La Bresse	2nd	2nd
Elite Women	2019	Maribor	1st	
Elite Women	2020	Lousã	3rd	
Elite Women	2020	Lousã	3rd	
Elite Women	2021	Les Gets	1st	
Elite Women	2021	Lenzerheide	2nd	
Elite Women	2022	Lourdes	3rd	
Elite Women	2024	Val di Sole	1st	
Elite Women	2025	Bielsko Biala	1st	
Elite Women	2025	Loudenvielle	3rd	
Elite Women	2025	Pal Arinsal	1st	

Other races
Season	Event	Discipline	Venue	Position
2014	iXS European Downhill Cup	Downhill	Pila	1st
2017	British National Championships	Downhill	Rhyd–Y-Felin	1st
2017	British Downhill Series	Downhill	Llangollen	1st
2018	Crankworx Rotorua	Downhill	Rotorua	1st
2018	British Downhill Series	Downhill	Cwmcarn	2nd
2018	British Downhill Series	Downhill	Fort William	2nd
2019	Crankworx Rotorua	Pump Track Challenge	Rotorua	3rd
2019	Crankworx Rotorua	Dual Slalom	Rotorua	3rd
2019	Crankworx Rotorua	Downhill	Rotorua	3rd
