= Josh Bryceland =

English racing cyclist

Josh Bryceland (Ratboy)
Personal information
- Full name: Joshua Antonio Torres Bryceland
- Nickname: Ratboy bumboclaat
- Born: 23 March 1990 (age 36) England; United Kingdom
- Height: 6 ft 1 in (185 cm)
- Weight: 180 lb (82 kg)

Cycling career
- Sport: Cycling
- Current team: Cannondale
- Discipline: MTB
- Role: Rider/Ambassador
- Rider type: DH/Enduro

Amateur team
- 2015–present: 50to01

Professional teams
- 2005–2006: Northwest Mountain Bike Centre
- 2007: Royal Racing
- 2008–2016: Santa Cruz Syndicate
- 2016–2018: Santa Cruz Enduro Team(EWS)
- 2019–present: Cannondale Cycles

Major wins
- (United Kingdom) GBR DH Junior National Champion (2 Wins) (Europe) EUR DH Youth European Champion (1 Wins); UCI DH Junior World Champion (1 Wins); UCI DH Junior World Cup Overall (1 Wins); UCI DH World Cup Overall (1 Wins)
Medal record
Representing United Kingdom
Men's mountain bike racing
Junior World Championships
Gold medal – first place	2008 Val Di Sole	Downhill

Joshua Antonio Torres Bryceland, known as Josh Bryceland, and commonly referred to by his nickname, Ratboy, born 23 March 1990, in Manchester is a professional downhill mountain biker, who lives in Higher Poynton, Cheshire, England.

He entered his first race at 10 . Andy Kyffin signed him to his Northwest Mountain Bike Centre team. He won regional and national junior titles. One of his father's friends, Steve Peat signed him to his Royal Racing team. Bryceland was Junior World Cup Series Champion in 2007 and finished 9th in the Elite Men's race of the Maribor World Cup round. After 2016 he left the Santa Cruz Syndicate team to pursue Enduro racing. Josh has since left the team and is now riding as a Freerider and brand ambassador for Cannondale Cycles.

In 2008 Bryceland followed Peat to the Santa Cruz Syndicate racing team and won the junior world championship in Val di Sole, Italy.

== Palmarès ==
2006
1st (Europe) DH, European Mountain Bike Championships - Youth

2007
4th DH, NPS #1 Innerleithen, Scotland - Junior
1st DH, Dragon Downhill, Welsh Championships, Wales, Series Overall
1st (United Kingdom) DH, British National Mountain Biking Championships - Junior
1st DH, UCI Mountain Bike World Cup, Series Overall - Junior

2008
1st (United Kingdom) DH, British National Mountain Biking Championships - Junior
1st DH, UCI Mountain Bike & Trials World Championships, Val di Sole, Italy - Junior

2011
1st (United Kingdom) DH, British National Mountain Biking Rd.3 - Elite
2nd DH, UCI Mountain Bike World Cup, Mont Saint Anne, Canada - Elite Male

2014
1st (United Kingdom) DH, British Cycling National Championships - Senior Male Championship
2nd DH, UCI Mountain Bike World Cup, Cairns, Australia - Elite Male
1st DH, UCI Mountain Bike World Cup, Leogang, Austria - Elite Male
2nd DH, UCI Mountain Bike World Cup, Mont Sainte Anne, Canada - Elite Male
1st DH, UCI Mountain Bike World Cup, Windham, United States - Elite Male
2nd DH, UCI Mountain Bike World Championships Hafjell, Norway - Elite Male

== See also ==
- Santa Cruz Syndicate
