= Luca Shaw =

American cyclist

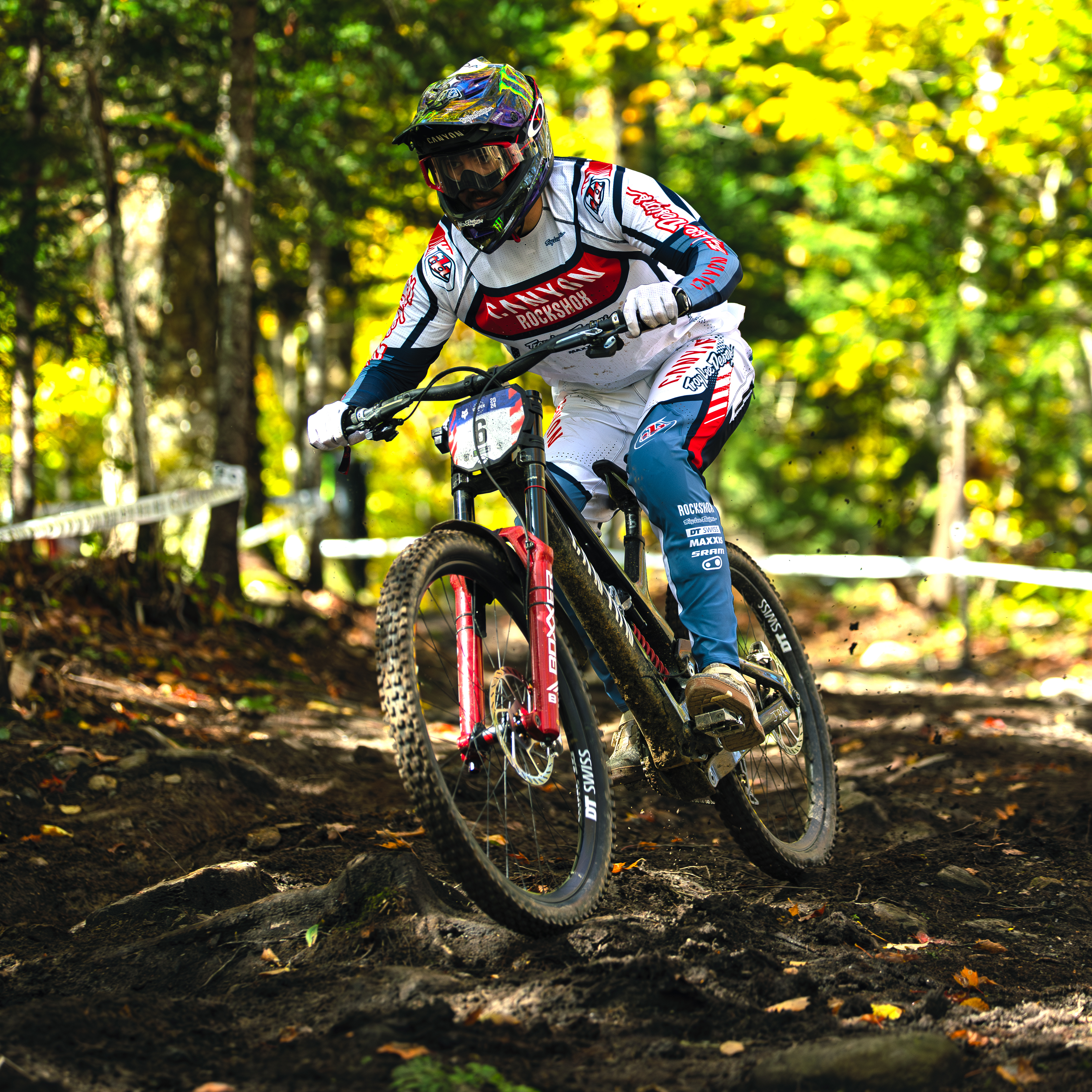
- Shaw in 2024

Personal information
- Born: December 25, 1996 (age 29)

Cycling career
- Sport: Cycling
- Current team: Canyon CLCCTV
- Discipline: Downhill mountain biking
- Role: Rider

Luca Shaw (born December 25, 1996) is an American professional downhill mountain bike racer. He races UCI world cups for the Canyon Collective Factory Team and the UCI World Championships for Team USA Cycling.

== Personal life ==
Shaw was born in San Francisco, California but has been living in Hendersonville, North Carolina since he was 8. His older brother Walker is also a mountain bike racer. His father Doug Shaw works for Ohlins Suspension while his mother Griet Vandekerckhove works for a Belgian fashion designer. Since the summer of 2018, he has been in a relationship with Swiss cyclist Jolanda Neff.
