= 2014 UCI Mountain Bike & Trials World Championships – Men's cross-country =

== Results ==
#	Cyclist	Nation		Time
1	Julien Absalon	France	in	1 h 27 min 06 s
2	Nino Schurter	Switzerland		1 h 28 min 57 s
3	Marco Aurelio Fontana	Italy		1 h 30 min 34 s
4	Moritz Milatz	Germany		1 h 30 min 39 s
5	Manuel Fumic	Germany		1 h 30 min 49 s
6	Sergio Mantecón	Spain		1 h 31 min 02 s
7	Lukas Flückiger	Switzerland		1 h 31 min 31 s
8	Jaroslav Kulhavý	Czech Republic		1 h 31 min 39 s
9	José Antonio Hermida	Spain		1 h 31 min 46 s
10	Ralph Näf	Switzerland		1 h 32 min 12 s
11	Fabian Giger	Switzerland		1 h 32 min 39 s
12	Ondřej Cink	Czech Republic		1 h 32 min 58 s
13	Andrea Tiberi	Italy		1 h 33 min 06 s
14	Rudi van Houts	Netherlands		1 h 33 min 22 s
15	Derek Zandstra	Canada		1 h 33 min 30 s
16	Carlos Coloma	Spain		1 h 33 min 50 s
17	Maxime Marotte	France		1 h 34 min 36 s
18	Markus Schulte-Luenzum	Germany		1 h 34 min 45 s
19	Mathias Flückiger	Switzerland		1 h 34 min 57 s
20	Gerhard Kerschbaumer	Italy		1 h 35 min 03 s
21	Michal Lami	Slovakia		1 h 35 min 24 s
22	Markus Bauer	Germany		1 h 35 min 35 s
23	Hugo Drechou	France		1 h 35 min 42 s
24	Catriel Andrés Soto	Argentina		1 h 36 min 04 s
25	Kevin Van Hoovels	Belgium		1 h 36 min 13 s
26	David Valero	Spain		1 h 36 min 17 s
27	Miguel Martinez	France		1 h 36 min 29 s
28	Stephen Ettinger	United States		1 h 36 min 31 s
29	David Serralheiro Rosa	Portugal		1 h 36 min 35 s
30	Hans Becking	Netherlands		1 h 36 min 38 s
31	Kohei Yamamoto	Japan		1 h 36 min 44 s
32	Frank Beemer	Netherlands		1 h 36 min 50 s
33	Marek Konwa	Poland		1 h 37 min 02 s
34	Russell Finsterwald	United States		1 h 37 min 24 s
35	Matthias Wengelin	Sweden		1 h 37 min 33 s
36	Jan Škarnitzl	Czech Republic		1 h 37 min 38 s
37	Florian Vogel	Switzerland		1 h 37 min 52 s
38	Alexander Gehbauer	Austria		1 h 37 min 56 s
39	Anton Gogolev	Russia		1 h 38 min 00 s
40	Stéphane Tempier	France		1 h 38 min 07 s
41	András Parti	Hungary		1 h 38 min 26 s
42	Philip Buys	South Africa		1 h 38 min 42 s
43	Anton Sintsov	Russia		1 h 39 min 25 s
44	Todd Wells	United States		
45	Luca Braidot	Italy		
46	Shlomi Haimy	Israel		
47	Martin Haring	Slovakia		
48	Evan Guthrie	Canada		
49	Ruben Scheire	Belgium		
50	Zsolt Juhasz	Hungary		
51	Rotem Ishay	Israel		
52	Ole Christian Fagerli	Norway		
53	Karl Markt	Austria		
54	Martin Fanger	Switzerland		
55	Rourke Croeser	South Africa		
56	Spencer Paxson	United States		
57	Matiss Preimanis	Latvia		
58	Thomas Litscher	Switzerland		
59	Jukka Vastaranta	Finland		
60	Kirill Kazantsev	Kazakhstan		
61	Ola Kjøren	Norway		
62	Christian Helmig	Luxembourg		
63	Daniele Braidot	Italy		
64	Raphael Gagne	Canada		
65	Zhen Wang	China		
66	Martin Gluth	Germany		
67	Ricardo Pscheidt	Brazil		
68	Paolo Montoya Cantillo	Costa Rica		
69	Simon Gegenheimer	Germany		
70	Jan Nesvadba	Czech Republic		
71	Ignacio Torres	Mexico		
72	Dario Gasco	Argentina		
73	Marco Escarcega	Mexico		
74	Seiya Hirano	Japan		
75	Ryo Saito	Japan		
76	Geoff Kabush	Canada		
77	Tudor Oprea Ovidiu	Romania		
78	Artyom Golovaschenko	Kazakhstan		
79	Rubens Valeriano	Brazil		
80	José Juan Escarcega	Mexico		
81	Abdulkadir Kelleci	Turkey		
82	Mario Miranda Costa	Portugal		
83	Miguel Valadez	Mexico		
84	Sherman De Paiva	Brazil		
85	Pablo Voigt Rodriguez	Mexico		
86	Johan Stroemberg	Norway		
87	Lucian Logigan	Romania		
88	Miha Halzer	Slovenia		
89	Periklís Ilías	Greece		
90	Bayram Eroglu	Turkey		
91	Motoshi Kadota	Japan		
92	Oskars Muiznieks	Latvia		
93	Elia Silvestri	Italy		
94	George-Vlad Sabau	Romania		
95	Paul Van der Ploeg	Australia		
