= Cycling at the 2015 Pan American Games =

- Cycling pictograms for the games
- Venues: Centennial Park Pan Am BMX Centre (BMX); Hardwood Mountain Bike Park (Mountain biking); Ontario Place West Channel (Road races); Milton Velodrome (Track); Milton Time Trial Course (Road time trial)
- Dates: July 10–25
- No. of events: 18 (9 men, 9 women)
- Competitors: 227 from 24 nations

Cycling competitions at the 2015 Pan American Games in Toronto were held July 10 to 25, 2015 at four venues. The BMX competitions took place at the Centennial Park Pan Am BMX Centre in Toronto, the mountain biking competitions happened at the Hardwood Ski and Bike (Hardwood Mountain Bike Park) in Oro-Medonte, due to naming rights the venue was known as the latter for the duration of the games. The road races happened in the streets of Downtown Toronto with the start and finish being adjacent to the Ontario Place West Channel. Finally the track cycling events occurred at the Milton Velodrome in Milton. The road cycling time trials happened in the streets surrounding the velodrome (Milton Time Trial Course).

== Competition schedule ==
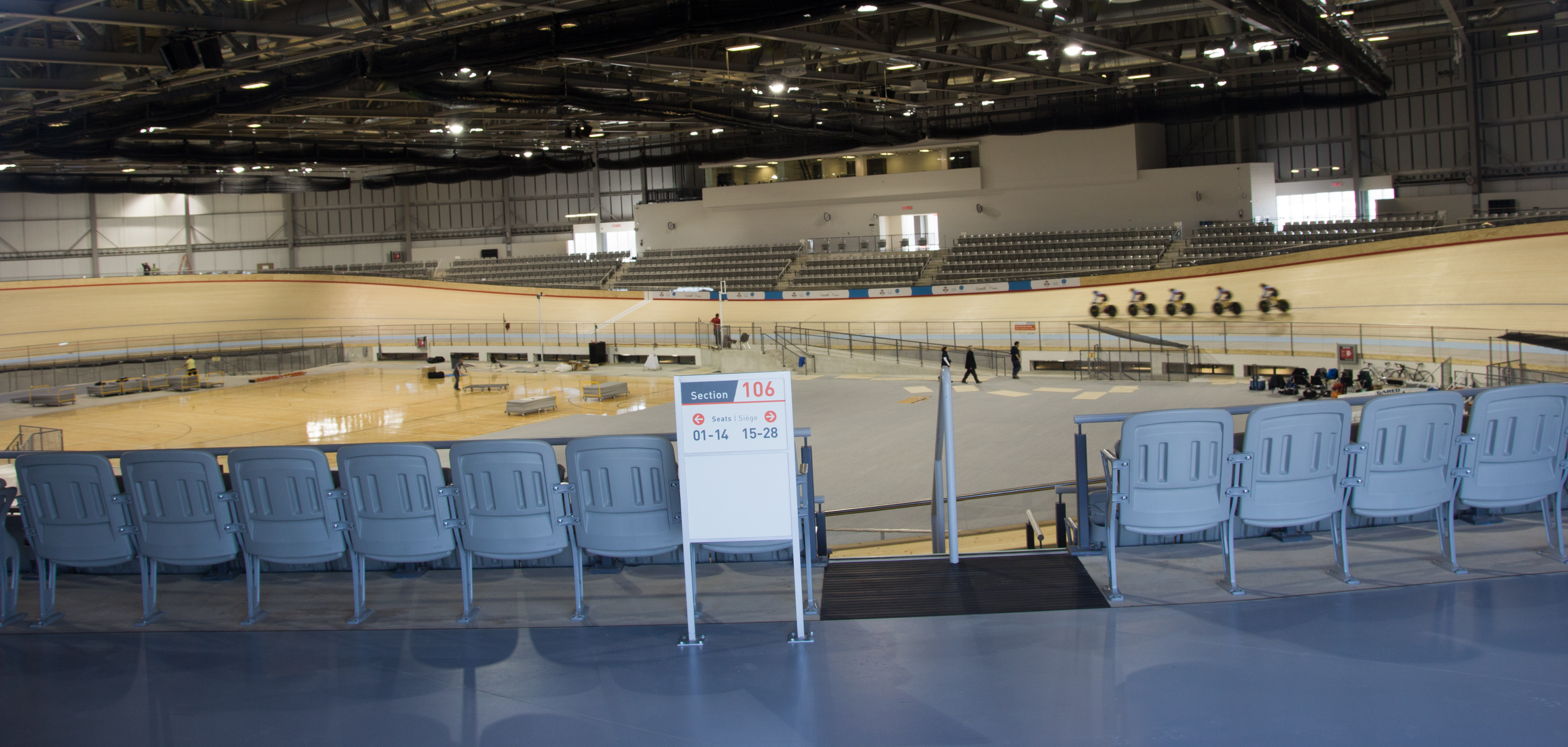
The Milton Velodrome, in Milton, was the venue for the track cycling competitions, along with the starting/finishing line for the road cycling time trials.

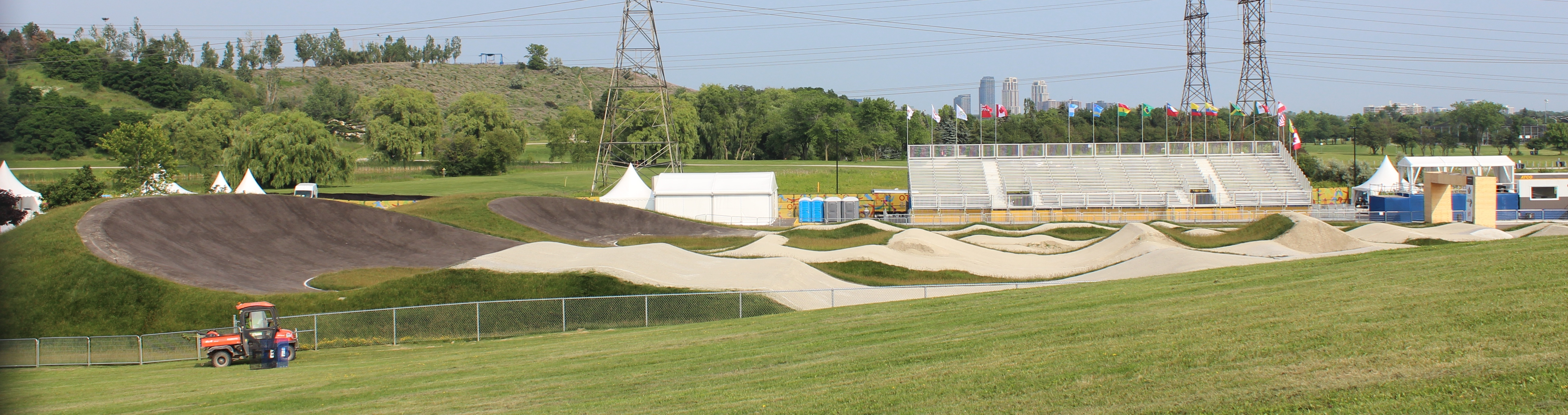
The Centennial Park Pan Am BMX Centre was the venue for the BMX competitions

The following was the competition schedule for the cycling competitions:

Q	Qualification	¼	Quarterfinals	½	Semifinals	F	Final

BMX, mountain biking and road cycling
Event↓/Date →	Fri 10	Sat 11			Sun 12	Wed 22	Sat 25
BMX
Men's BMX	Q	¼	½	F			
Women's BMX	Q	½		F			
Mountain biking
Men's cross-country					F		
Women's cross-country					F		
Road cycling
Men's road race							F
Men's time trial						F	
Women's road race							F
Women's time trial						F	

Track cycling
Event↓/Date →	Thu 16		Fri 17				Sat 18			Sun 19		
Men's keirin										H		F
Men's omnium			FL	PR		ER	IP	SR	TT			
Men's sprint			H				¼	½	F			
Men's team pursuit	H	F										
Men's team sprint	H	F										
Women's keirin										H		F
Women's omnium							FL	PR	ER	IP	SR	TT
Women's sprint			H	¼	½	F						
Women's team pursuit			H		F							
Women's team sprint	H	F										

FL = Flying Lap, PR = Points Race, ER = Elimination Race, IP = Individual Pursuit, SR = Scratch Race, TT = Time Trial

== Medal table ==
* Host nation (Canada)

Rank	Nation	Gold	Silver	Bronze	Total
1	Canada*	11	4	5	20
2	United States	3	2	3	8
3	Colombia	3	0	3	6
4	Venezuela	1	2	1	4
5	Cuba	0	3	1	4
6	Argentina	0	2	1	3
6	Mexico	0	2	1	3
8	Ecuador	0	2	0	2
9	Trinidad and Tobago	0	1	0	1
10	Brazil	0	0	2	2
11	El Salvador	0	0	1	1
Totals (11 entries)		18	18	18	54

== Medalists ==
=== BMX ===
Event	Gold	Silver	Bronze
Men	Tory Nyhaug; Canada	Alfredo Campo; Ecuador	Nicholas Long; United States
Women	Felicia Stancil; United States	Doménica Azuero; Ecuador	Mariana Díaz; Argentina

=== Mountain biking ===
Event	Gold	Silver	Bronze
Men's cross-country	Raphaël Gagné; Canada	Catriel Soto; Argentina	Stephen Ettinger; United States
Women's cross-country	Emily Batty; Canada	Catharine Pendrel; Canada	Erin Huck; United States

=== Road cycling ===
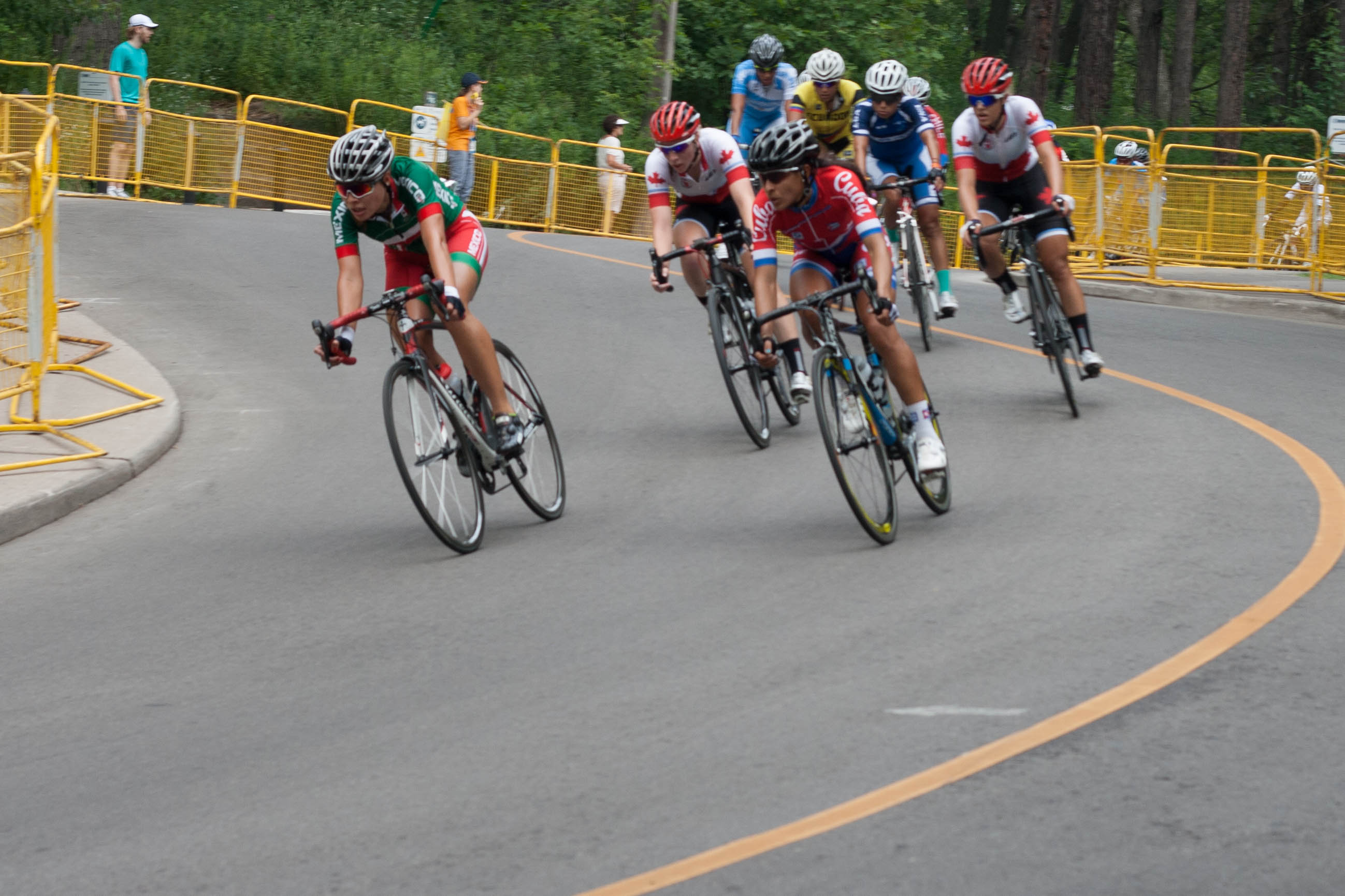
Women's road race at the 2015 Pan American Games

Event	Gold	Silver	Bronze
Men's road race	Miguel Ubeto; Venezuela	Eric Marcotte; United States	Guillaume Boivin; Canada
Women's road race	Jasmin Glaesser; Canada	Marlies Mejías; Cuba	Allison Beveridge; Canada
Men's time trial	Hugo Houle; Canada	Ignacio Prado; Mexico	Sean MacKinnon; Canada
Women's time trial	Kelly Catlin; United States	Jasmin Glaesser; Canada	Evelyn García; El Salvador

=== Track cycling ===
Event	Gold	Silver	Bronze
Men's team pursuit	Colombia; Juan Esteban Arango; Arles Castro; Fernando Gaviria; Jhonatan Restrepo	Argentina; Mauro Agostini; Maximiliano Richeze; Walter Pérez; Adrián Richeze; Juan Merlos	Canada; Eric Johnstone; Sean MacKinnon; Rémi Pelletier-Roy; Edward Veal; Adam Jamieson
Women's team pursuit	Canada; Allison Beveridge; Laura Brown; Jasmin Glaesser; Kirsti Lay	United States; Jennifer Valente; Sarah Hammer; Kelly Catlin; Lauren Tamayo; Ruth Winder	Mexico; Sofía Arreola; Íngrid Drexel; Mayra Del Rocio Rocha; Lizbeth Salazar
Men's individual sprint	Hugo Barrette; Canada	Njisane Phillip; Trinidad and Tobago	Hersony Canelón; Venezuela
Women's individual sprint	Monique Sullivan; Canada	Kate O'Brien; Canada	Juliana Gaviria; Colombia
Men's team sprint	Canada; Hugo Barrette; Evan Carey; Joseph Veloce	Venezuela; Hersony Canelón; César Marcano; Ángel Pulgar	Brazil; Flávio Cipriano; Kacio Fonseca; Hugo Osteti
Women's team sprint	Canada; Kate O'Brien; Monique Sullivan	Cuba; Lisandra Guerra; Marlies Mejías	Colombia; Diana García; Juliana Gaviria
Men's keirin	Fabián Puerta; Colombia	Hersony Canelón; Venezuela	Hugo Barrette; Canada
Women's keirin	Monique Sullivan; Canada	Lisandra Guerra; Cuba	Juliana Gaviria; Colombia
Men's omnium	Fernando Gaviria; Colombia	Ignacio Prado; Mexico	Gideoni Monteiro; Brazil
Women's omnium	Sarah Hammer; United States	Jasmin Glaesser; Canada	Marlies Mejías; Cuba

== Participation ==
A total of 24 countries qualified athletes. The number of athletes a nation entered is in parentheses beside the name of the country.

- Antigua and Barbuda (2)
- Argentina (21)
- Aruba (1)
- Bermuda (2)
- Bolivia (2)
- Brazil (24)
- Canada (24)
- Chile (19)
- Colombia (24)
- Costa Rica (5)
- Cuba (6)
- Dominican Republic (2)
- Ecuador (12)
- El Salvador (2)
- Guatemala (10)
- Jamaica (1)
- Mexico (18)
- Peru (4)
- Puerto Rico (2)
- Suriname (1)
- Trinidad and Tobago (5)
- United States (17)
- Uruguay (2)
- Venezuela (21)

== Qualification ==
A total of 228 cyclists qualified to compete at the games (146 in road and track combined, 36 in mountain biking and 38 in BMX). A nation was able to enter at most 24 athletes (16 among road and track cycling, four in mountain biking and four in BMX). The host nation (Canada) automatically entered a full team of 24 athletes (14 male and 10 female).

== See also ==
- Cycling at the 2016 Summer Olympics
