= Hammarlund (surname) =

Hammarlund is a Swedish language habitational surname denoting a person originally living near a grove (Swedish: lund) on or near a cliff or crag (Old Norse: hamarr) and may refer to:

- Elias Aguirre (born 1984), Swedish politician
- Gösta Hammarlund (1903–1987), Norwegian illustrator and journalist
- Nestor Hammarlund (1888–1966), Swedish politician
- Ole Hammarlund, Canadian politician
- Pauline Hammarlund (born 1994), Swedish footballer
