= Cycling at the 2015 Pan American Games – Men's BMX =

Cycling – Men's BMX at the 2015 Pan American Games
- Venue: Centennial Park Pan Am BMX Centre
- Dates: July 10–11, 2015
- Competitors: 22 from 13 nations
- Winning time: 36.208

Medalists
Gold medal	Tory Nyhaug	Canada
Silver medal	Alfredo Campo	Ecuador
Bronze medal	Nicholas Long	United States

The men's BMX competition of the cycling events at the 2015 Pan American Games was held between July 10 and 11 at the Centennial Park Pan Am BMX Centre in Toronto, Ontario, Canada.

== Schedule ==
All times are Eastern Standard Time (UTC-3).

Date	Time	Round
July 10, 2015	12:00	Time Trial Qualifying
July 10, 2015	13:00	Time Trial Superfinal
July 11, 2015	14:05	Quarterfinals Run 1
July 11, 2015	14:40	Quarterfinals Run 2
July 11, 2015	15:05	Quarterfinals Run 3
July 11, 2015	15:45	Semifinals
July 11, 2015	16:15	Final

== Results ==
=== Time Trials ===
Rank	Name	Nation	Qualifying		Super-Final	
Rank	Name	Nation	Time	Rank	Time	Rank
1	Tory Nyhaug	Canada	36.640	3	36.113	1
2	Carlos Oquendo	Colombia	37.470	8	36.534	2
3	Gonzalo Molina	Argentina	37.170	5	36.944	3
4	Ramiro Marino Carlomagno	Argentina	37.150	4	37.023	4
5	Renato Rezende	Brazil	37.410	7	37.308	5
6	James Brown	Canada	37.880	9	37.411	6
7	Nicholas Long	United States	38.050	11	37.583	7
8	Emilio Falla Buchely	Ecuador	37.890	10	38.026	8
9	Anderson Ezequiel De Souza Filho	Brazil	37.340	6	38.042	9
10	Christopher Mireles	Mexico	38.370	12	38.464	10
11	Jefferson Milano Duran	Venezuela	38.510	13	38.522	11
12	Elias Aguirre	Chile	39.120	15	38.884	12
13	Jaime Quintanilla Cuenca	Bolivia	39.460	16	39.368	13
14	Connor Fields	United States	36.120	1	1:00.193	14
15	Carlos Ramírez	Colombia	36.540	2	1:12.361	15
16	Zaithyel Soekandar	Aruba	38.590	14	DNF	
17	Esteban Yaffar	Bolivia	39.520	17	Did not qualify	
18	Maliek Byndloss	Jamaica	42.760	18	Did not qualify	
19	Juan Carlos Zuniga Canani	Peru	44.090	19	Did not qualify	
20	Jaime Koochoy Wong	Peru	44.350	20	Did not qualify	
21	Enrique Luis Diaz Cedeno	Venezuela	1:16.720	21	Did not qualify	
22	Alfredo Campo Vintimilla	Ecuador	2:08.440	22	Did not qualify	
	Cristobal Palominos	Chile	DNS			
	Alan Roman	Mexico	DNS			

=== Quarterfinals ===
First 4 riders in each quarterfinal qualify to semifinal.

Rank	Heat	Name	Nation	Race 1	Race 2	Race 3	Points	Notes
1	1	Tory Nyhaug	Canada	37.260 (1)	37.304 (1)	36.605 (1)	3	Q
2	1	Anderson Ezequiel De Souza Filho	Brazil	38.317 (3)	38.955 (2)	37.210 (2)	7	Q
3	1	Emilio Falla Buchely	Ecuador	38.057 (2)	41.183 (3)	37.886 (3)	8	Q
4	1	Esteban Yaffar	Bolivia	54.231 (5)	45.566 (4)	43.977 (4)	13	Q
5	1	Zaithyel Soekandar	Aruba	47.830 (4)	REL (7)	DNF (5)	16	
1	2	Carlos Oquendo	Colombia	37.051 (1)	37.100 (2)	36.196 (1)	4	Q
2	2	Carlos Ramírez	Colombia	37.532 (2)	36.593 (1)	36.243 (2)	5	Q
3	2	Nicholas Long	United States	38.171 (4)	37.608 (3)	37.298 (3)	10	Q
4	2	Maliek Byndloss	Jamaica	38.003 (3)	37.746 (4)	37.693 (4)	11	Q
5	2	Christopher Mireles	Mexico	44.703 (5)	38.246 (5)	37.993 (5)	15	
1	3	Connor Fields	United States	36.519 (1)	37.083 (1)	36.223 (1)	3	Q
2	3	Gonzalo Molina	Argentina	37.557 (3)	37.633 (2)	37.037 (3)	8	Q
3	3	Alfredo Campo Vintimilla	Ecuador	36.902 (2)	1:00.416 (5)	36.549 (2)	9	Q
4	3	Jefferson Milano Duran	Venezuela	38.564 (4)	38.206 (3)	38.677 (5)	12	Q
5	3	Juan Carlos Zuniga Canani	Peru	52.755 (5)	46.478 (4)	43.117 (6)	15	
6	3	James Brown	Canada	REL (8)	3:27.565 (6)	37.313 (4)	18	
1	4	Renato Rezende	Brazil	38.570 (2)	37.155 (1)	37.109 (1)	4	Q
2	4	Ramiro Marino Carlomagno	Argentina	37.331 (1)	37.699 (2)	38.626 (3)	6	Q
3	4	Jaime Quintanilla Cuenca	Bolivia	40.005 (4)	38.641 (3)	40.061 (4)	11	Q
4	4	Elias Aguirre	Chile	39.371 (3)	REL (8)	38.571 (2)	13	Q
5	4	Jaime Koochoy Wong	Peru	49.300 (5)	43.105 (4)	46.687 (5)	14	
6	4	Enrique Luis Diaz Cedeno	Venezuela	DNS (8)	DNS (8)	DNS	16	

=== Semifinal ===
The top four cyclists advanced to the final.

Rank	Heat	Name	Nation	Time	Gap	Notes
1	1	Tory Nyhaug	Canada	36.405	-	Q
2	1	Gonzalo Molina	Argentina	37.350	+0.945	Q
3	1	Emilio Falla Buchely	Ecuador	37.574	+1.169	Q
4	1	Carlos Ramírez	Colombia	37.795	+1.390	Q
5	1	Jefferson Milano Duran	Venezuela	38.406	+2.001	
6	1	Renato Rezende	Brazil	45.317	+8.912	
7	1	Jaime Quintanilla Cuenca	Bolivia	47.343	+10.938	
8	1	Maliek Byndloss	Jamaica	48.100	+11.695	
1	2	Connor Fields	United States	36.479	-	Q
2	2	Anderson Ezequiel De Souza Filho	Brazil	36.772	+0.293	Q
3	2	Alfredo Campo Vintimilla	Ecuador	37.254	+0.775	Q
4	2	Nicholas Long	United States	37.661	+1.182	Q
5	2	Ramiro Marino Carlomagno	Argentina	37.864	+1.385	
6	2	Elias Aguirre	Chile	44.362	+7.883	
7	2	Esteban Yaffar	Bolivia	44.820	+8.341	
8	2	Carlos Oquendo	Colombia	1:29.024	+52.545	

=== Final ===
Rank	Name	Nation	Time	Gap	Notes
1st place, gold medalist(s)	Tory Nyhaug	Canada	36.208	-	
2nd place, silver medalist(s)	Alfredo Campo Vintimilla	Ecuador	36.501	+0.293	
3rd place, bronze medalist(s)	Nicholas Long	United States	37.046	+0.838	
4	Anderson Ezequiel De Souza Filho	Brazil	37.299	+1.091	
5	Emilio Falla Buchely	Ecuador	38.519	+2.311	
6	Gonzalo Molina	Argentina	40.574	+4.366	
	Connor Fields	United States	DNF		
	Carlos Ramírez	Colombia	REL		
