= Crawford Carrick-Anderson =

Scottish downhill mountainbiker and skier

Crawford Carrick-Anderson (born 1970) is a Scottish former World Cup downhill mountainbiker and skier. He is profoundly deaf.

As a professional cyclist he raced UCI Downhill World Cups for the Giant factory team, competed in the UCI Mountain Bike World Championships – classifying ninth overall in 1999 and 13th in 2002 – finished in second (1999) and third (2000) in the British National Mountain Biking Championships Downhill discipline, and was Scottish champion five times. After retiring in 2005, he continued to compete strongly at national age-group levels in other off-road disciplines such as Enduro and Cyclo-cross. His children are also active in the sport; son Corran competed in the UCI Mountain Bike & Trials World Championships in 2020 and 2021 in the Junior Cross-Country and Team relay events.

Originally from Dunblane, Carrick-Anderson learned to ski in the Cairngorms and became the Scottish Junior Champion in slalom skiing. He subsequently spent six years on the British Ski Team, and claimed medals in the sport in several editions of the Winter Deaflympics. By the time he quit skiing at the age of 23, he was Britain's highest ranked Slalom Skier. His younger sister Emma represented Great Britain as an alpine skier at four Winter Olympic Games.

Carrick-Anderson purchased his first trials motorbike at the age of 12, and competed at National and International level. Away from sport, he works as a sign maker and printer, based in Peebles.
