= Cycling at the 2015 Pan American Games – Women's cross-country =

Women's cross-country at the 2015 Pan American Games
- Venue: Hardwood Mountain Bike Park
- Dates: July 12
- Competitors: 15 from 9 nations
- Winning time: 1:27:13

Medalists
Gold medal	Emily Batty	Canada
Silver medal	Catharine Prendel	Canada
Bronze medal	Erin Huck	United States

The women's cross-country competition of the cycling events at the 2015 Pan American Games was held on July 12 at the Hardwood Mountain Bike Park in Oro-Medonte.

== Schedule ==
All times are Eastern Standard Time (UTC-3).

Date	Time	Round
July 12, 2015	10:05	Final

== Results ==
Rank	Rider	Nation	Time
1st place, gold medalist(s)	Emily Batty	Canada	1:27:13
2nd place, silver medalist(s)	Catharine Prendel	Canada	1:27:20
3rd place, bronze medalist(s)	Erin Huck	United States	1:32:36
4	Daniela Campuzano	Mexico	1:34:11
5	Raiza Goulao	Brazil	1:35:17
6	Isabella Moreira	Brazil	1:35:46
7	Kate Courtney	United States	1:36:20
8	Angela Parra	Colombia	1:38:21
9	Yosiana Quintero	Colombia	1:39:43
10	Laura Morfin	Mexico	1:40:18
11	Alexandra Serrano	Ecuador	1:44:07
12	Adriana Rojas	Costa Rica	1:45:20
13	Fernanda Castro	Chile	LAP
14	Michela Molina	Ecuador	LAP
	Agustina Apaza	Argentina	DNF
	Noelia Rodriguez	Argentina	DNS
