= UCI Mountain Bike World Championships =

Annual world international cycling competition

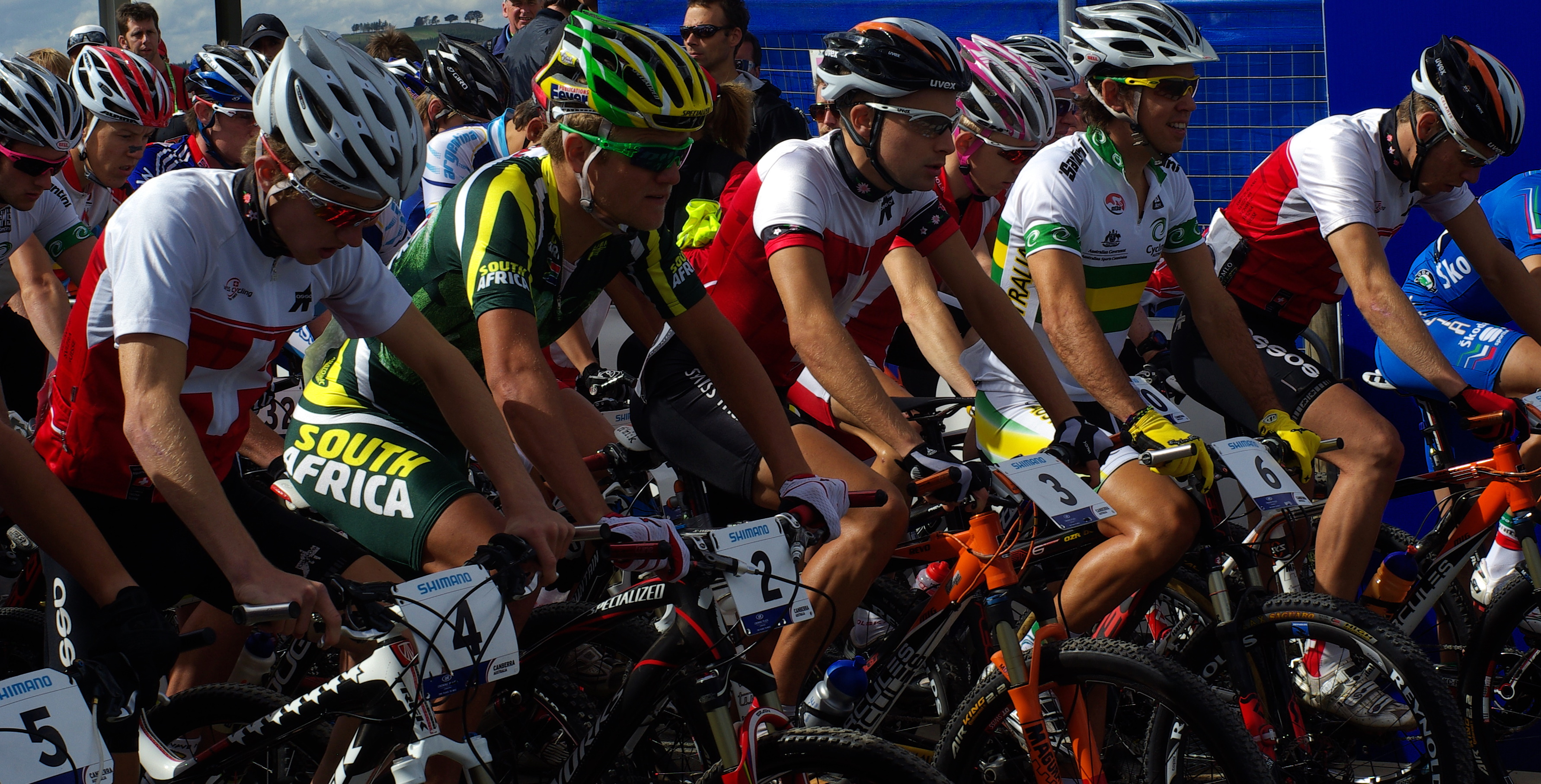
- Moments before the start of the under-23 men's cross-country race at the 2009 World Championships in Canberra, Australia. Eventual winner Burry Stander is second from left.
- Status: active
- Genre: sports event
- Date: varying
- Frequency: annual
- Inaugurated: 1990
- Organiser: UCI

The UCI Mountain Bike World Championships are the world championship events for mountain bike racing in the disciplines of cross country, downhill, and four-cross. They are organized by the Union Cycliste Internationale (UCI), the governing body of world cycling.

The first three finishers in each discipline at the World Championships are awarded gold, silver, and bronze medals. The winner of each discipline is also entitled to wear the rainbow jersey in events of the same discipline until the following year's World Championships. Unlike other UCI-sanctioned mountain-bike races, the competitors in the World Championships represent national rather than commercial teams. The World Championships are usually held towards the end of the season.

== History ==
The first UCI Mountain Bike World Championships took place in Durango, Colorado, USA in 1990 and featured only cross-country and downhill events. A separate UCI Trials World Championships had been held since 1986. From 2000 to 2016, the mountain bike and trials disciplines were combined and run as the UCI Mountain Bike & Trials World Championships. Beginning in 2017, the UCI world championships in trials will be run as part of the newly created UCI Urban Cycling World Championships.

The cross-country team relay was added in 1999. The dual slalom was added in 2000 but replaced by four-cross in 2002. Mountain bike marathon was included on the schedule at the 2003 championships in Lugano, but run separately as the UCI Mountain Bike Marathon World Championships from 2004 onwards. The cross-country eliminator was introduced in 2012 but will be part of the UCI Urban Cycling World Championships from 2017 onwards. In 2014 and 2015 the four-cross events were held separately from the other disciplines as the UCI Four-Cross World Championships, but were again included alongside the other mountain-biking disciplines in 2016. The four-cross events were removed again after the 2021 edition.

== Venues ==
Year	Country	City
1990	United States	Durango
1991	Italy	Barga
1992	Canada	Bromont
1993	France	Métabief
1994	United States	Vail
1995	Germany	Kirchzarten
1996	Australia	Cairns
1997	Switzerland	Château-d'Œx
1998	Canada	Mont-Sainte-Anne
1999	Sweden	Åre
2000	Spain	Sierra Nevada
2001	United States	Vail
2002	Austria	Kaprun
2003	Switzerland	Lugano
2004	France	Les Gets
2005	Italy	Livigno
2006	New Zealand	Rotorua
2007	United Kingdom	Fort William
2008	Italy	Val di Sole
2009	Australia	Canberra

Year	Country	City
2010	Canada	Mont-Sainte-Anne
2011	Switzerland	Champery
2012	Austria	Leogang-Saalfelden
2013	South Africa	Pietermaritzburg
2014	Norway	Lillehammer
2015	Andorra	Vallnord
2016	Czech Republic; Italy	Nové Město; Val di Sole
2017	Italy; Australia	Val di Sole; Cairns
2018	Switzerland	Lenzerheide
2019	Canada	Mont-Sainte-Anne
2020	Austria	Leogang
2021	Italy	Val di Sole
2022	France	Les Gets
2023	United Kingdom	Glasgow
2024	Andorra	Vallnord
2025	Switzerland	Valais
2026	Italy	Val di Sole

=== World Eliminator Championships ===
Year	Country	City
2019	Belgium	Waremme
2020	Belgium	Leuven
2021	Austria	Graz
2022	Spain	Barcelona
2023	Indonesia	Palangka Raya
2024	Germany	Aalen
2025	Turkey	Sakarya
2026	Spain	Barcelona

=== World Championships 4-Cross ===
Year	Country	City
2015	Italy	Val di Sole
2016	Italy	Val di Sole
2017	Italy	Val di Sole
2019	Italy	Val di Sole
2021	Italy	Val di Sole

== Events ==
Event	1990	1991	1992	1993	1994	1995	1996	1997	1998	1999	2000	2001	2002	2003	2004	2005	2006	2007	2008	2009	2010	2011	2012	2013	2014	2015	2016	2017	2018	2019
Men's cross-country	•	•	•	•	•	•	•	•	•	•	•	•	•	•	•	•	•	•	•	•	•	•	•	•	•	•	•	•	•	•
Men's cross-country eliminator																							•	•	•	•	•	•	•	•
Men's downhill	•	•	•	•	•	•	•	•	•	•	•	•	•	•	•	•	•	•	•	•	•	•	•	•	•	•	•	•	•	•
Men's dual											•	•																		
Men's four-cross													•	•	•	•	•	•	•	•	•	•	•	•	•	•	•	•	•	•
Men's trials, 20 inch			•	•	•	•	•	•	•	•	•	•	•	•	•	•	•	•	•	•	•	•	•	•	•	•	•	•	•	
Men's trials, 26 inch						•	•	•	•	•	•	•	•	•	•	•	•	•	•	•	•	•	•	•	•	•	•	•	•	
Women's cross-country	•	•	•	•	•	•	•	•	•	•	•	•	•	•	•	•	•	•	•	•	•	•	•	•	•	•	•	•	•	•
Women's cross-country eliminator																							•	•	•	•	•	•	•	•
Women's downhill	•	•	•	•	•	•	•	•	•	•	•	•	•	•	•	•	•	•	•	•	•	•	•	•	•	•	•	•	•	•
Women's dual											•	•																		
Women's four-cross													•	•	•	•	•	•	•	•	•	•	•	•	•	•	•	•	•	•
Women's trials												•	•	•	•	•	•	•	•	•	•	•	•	•	•	•	•	•	•	
Team relay										•	•	•	•	•	•	•	•	•	•	•	•	•	•	•	•	•	•	•	•	•

== UCI MTB World Champions ==
- Men's cross-country
- Women's cross-country
- Men's cross-country eliminator
- Women's cross-country eliminator
- Men's downhill
- Women's downhill
- Men's trials, 20 inch
- Men's trials, 26 inch
- Women's trials

== See also ==
- UCI Mountain Bike Marathon World Championships
- UCI Trials World Championships
- UCI Urban Cycling World Championships
- UCI Mountain Bike World Eliminator Championships
- UCI Mountain Bike World 4-Cross Championships
