= Venues of the 2015 Pan American and Parapan American Games =

Sports venues in Toronto, Ontario, Canada

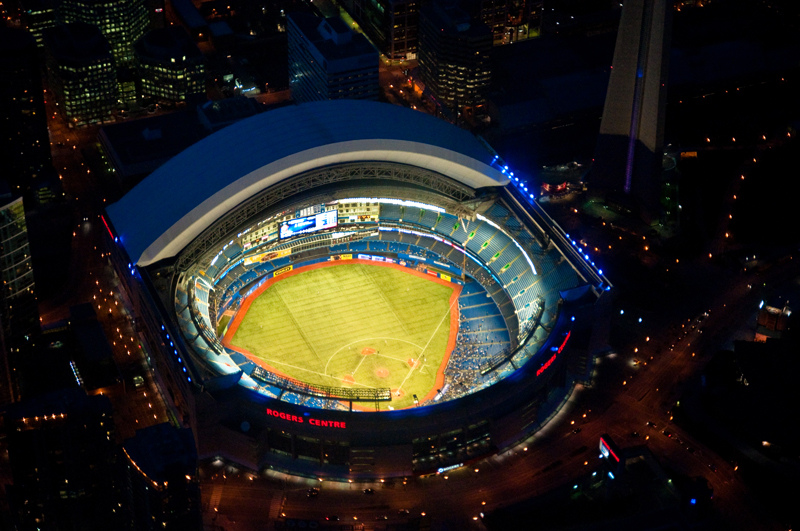
The Pan Am Ceremonies Venue hosted the opening and closing ceremonies of the 2015 Pan American Games

The 2015 Pan and Parapan American Games venues were mostly located in the host city of Toronto, Ontario, though some events required facilities located elsewhere. Besides Toronto, fourteen other municipalities in Southern Ontario hosted competitions: Ajax, Hamilton, Innisfil, Markham, Milton, Minden, Mississauga, Mono, Oro-Medonte, Oshawa, Palgrave, St. Catharines, Welland and Whitby.

== Naming ==
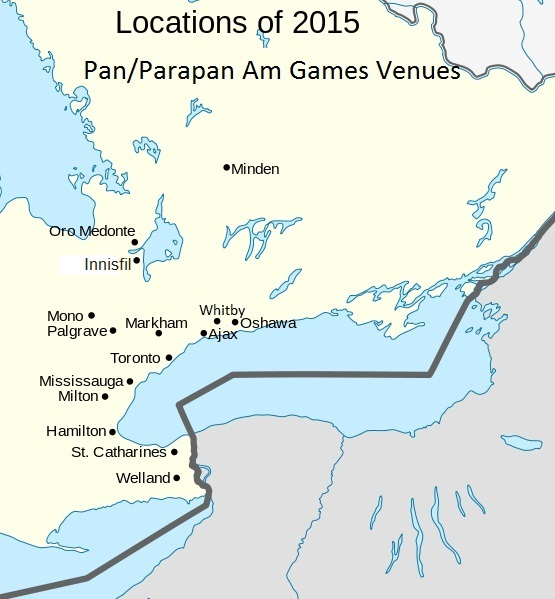
A map of the fifteen host cities

The Pan American Sports Organization (PASO) and the Toronto 2015 Organizing Committee have a number of major sponsors for the Pan American Games, who are entitled to have their name exclusively associated with the event. As a consequence, any other company that provides sponsorship is not permitted to use its name or branding during the games, which includes venue naming rights (including those not provided by corporate sponsorship and those named in honor of people).

As a consequence of this, eight Pan American venues are temporarily renamed for the duration of the Games:

- BMO Field – Exhibition Stadium
- General Motors Centre – Oshawa Sports Centre
- Hershey Centre – Mississauga Sports Centre
- Ricoh Coliseum – Toronto Coliseum
- Direct Energy Centre - Exhibition Centre
- Rexall Centre – Canadian Tennis Centre
- Rogers Centre – Pan Am Ceremonies Venue
- Tim Hortons Field - CIBC Hamilton Pan Am Soccer Stadium

== Sporting venues ==
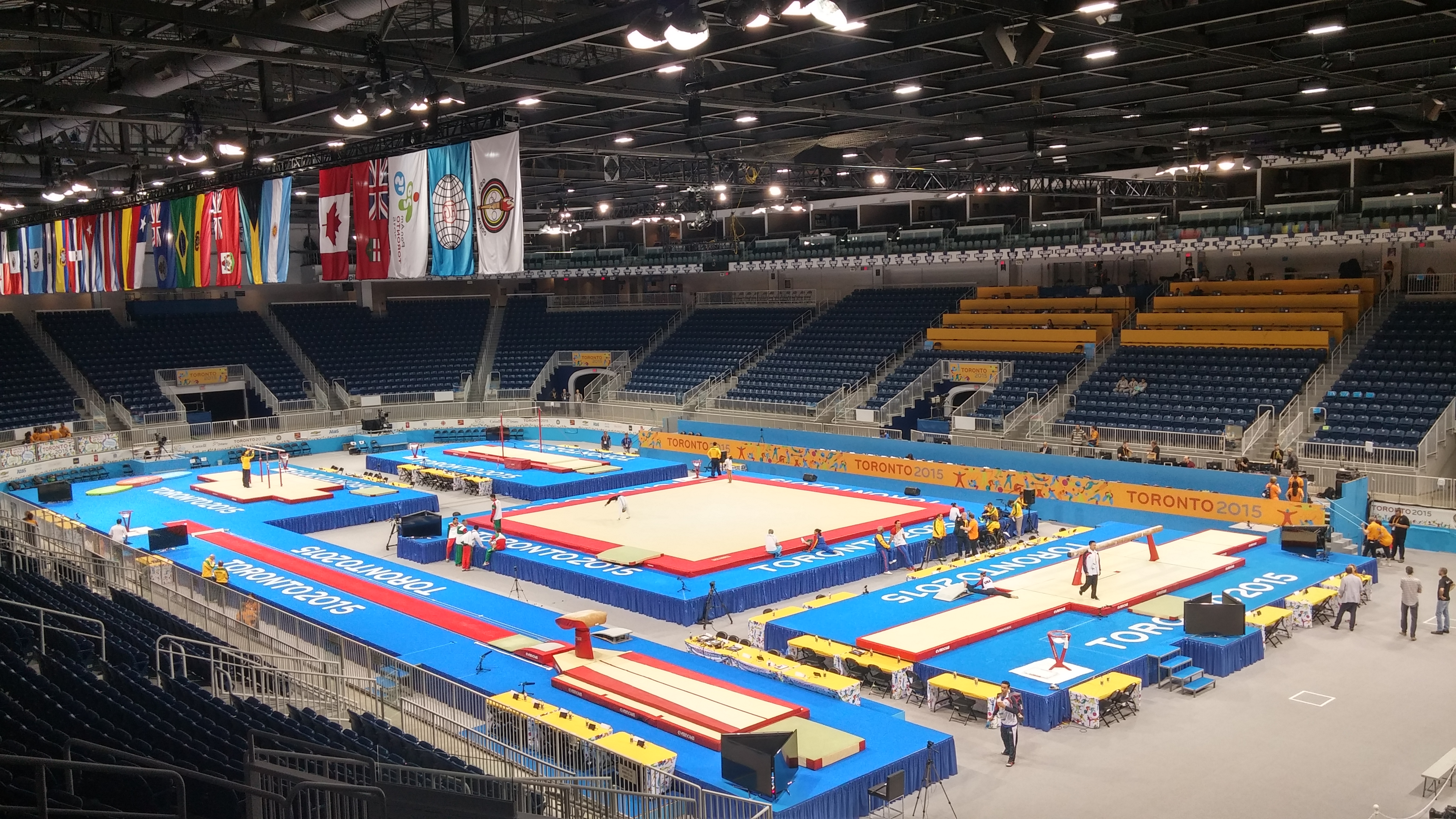
Toronto Coliseum during the gymnastics competitions

In total, 28 venues were used during the 2015 Pan American Games.

The 2015 Games used a mixture of newly built venues, existing facilities, and temporary facilities, some of them in well-known locations such as Exhibition Place and Centennial Park. Some of the new facilities were to be reused in their Pan American Games form (for example the BMX track), while others were reduced in size (for example the Toronto Pan Am Sports Centre).

All venue capacities listed below are found in the strategic framework for transportation published by the Government of Ontario.

=== CIBC Pan Am Park ===
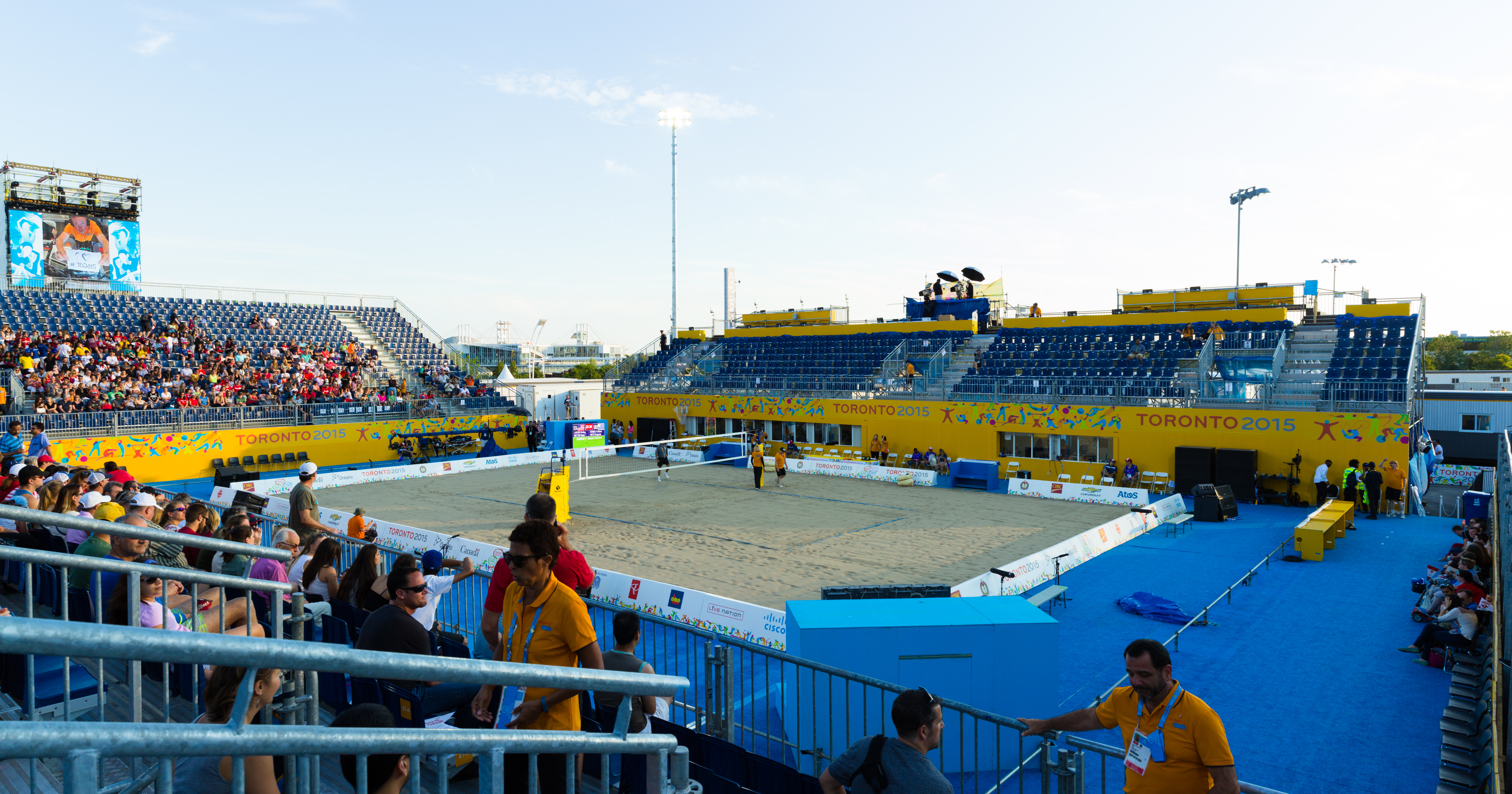
Chevrolet Beach Volleyball Centre

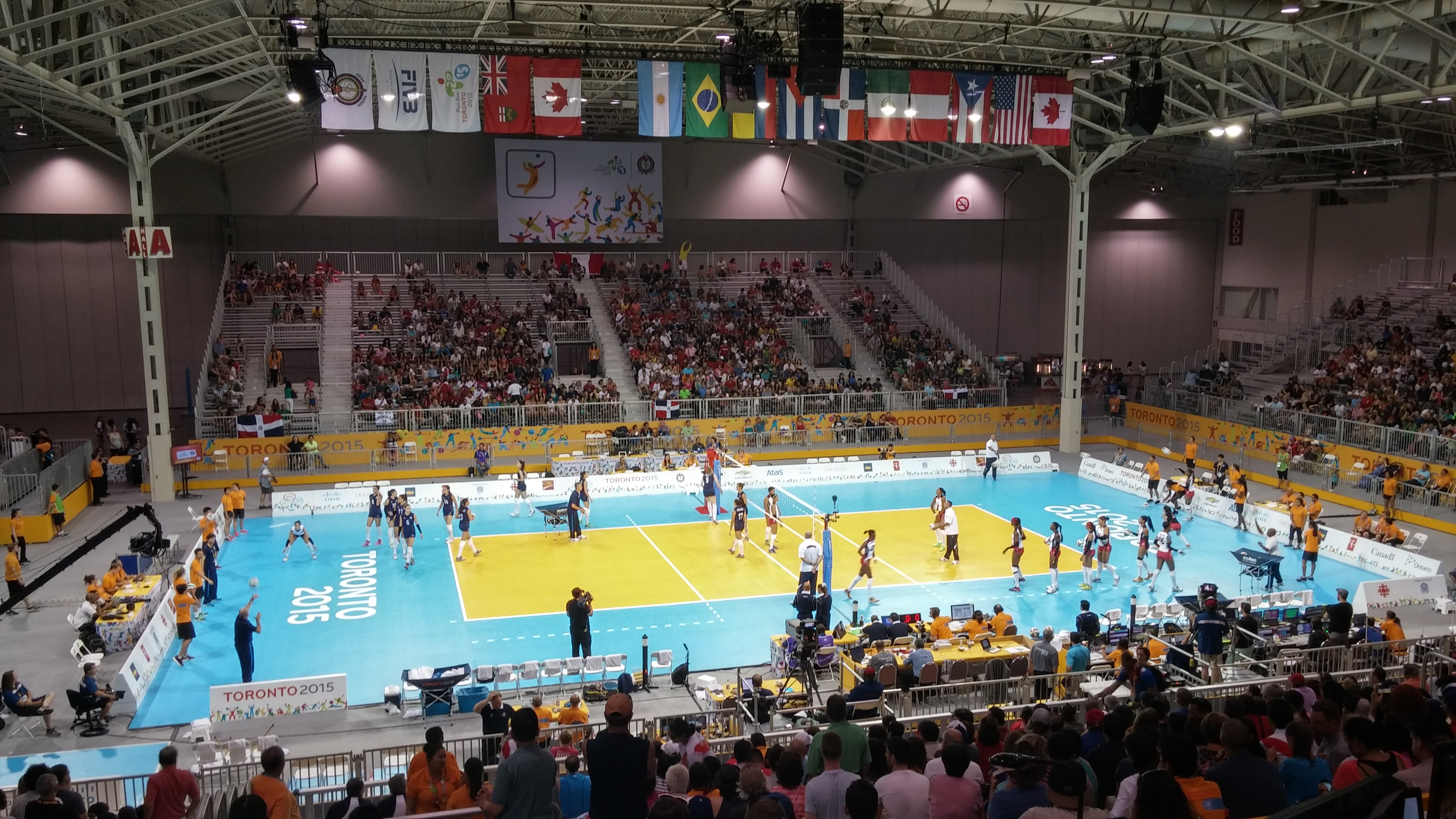
The Direct Energy Centre (Exhibition Centre) Hall A, was the venue for the indoor volleyball competitions

The Toronto Pan Am Park encompasses all of the facilities within Exhibition Place in downtown Toronto. The Pan Am Park included the name of the lead partner in sponsorship, CIBC. This Zone consists of six venues. Exhibition Centre had three different halls hosting events, while the Ontario Place West Channel had two grandstands (one each for water and road based sports). Furthermore, the marathon, race walks and road races in cycling had their start and finish lines at the West Channel. The remainder of the race occurred all the way into High Park and back. The park contains:

Venue	Sports		Capacity	Ref.
Venue	Pan American Games	Parapan American Games	Capacity	Ref.
Chevrolet Beach Volleyball Centre	Beach volleyball	—	5,000	
Exhibition Centre	Volleyball; Handball, Roller sports (artistic); Racquetball, Squash	—	4,900; 2,000; 1,000	
Exhibition Stadium	Rugby sevens	—	22,000	
Ontario Place West Channel	Athletics (marathon/race walk), Cycling (road race), Triathlon (cycling/run); Open water swimming, Triathlon (swim), Water skiing	Cycling (road race)	1,000	
Toronto Coliseum	Gymnastics (Artistic, rhythmic and trampoline)	—	7,252	

=== Rest of Toronto ===
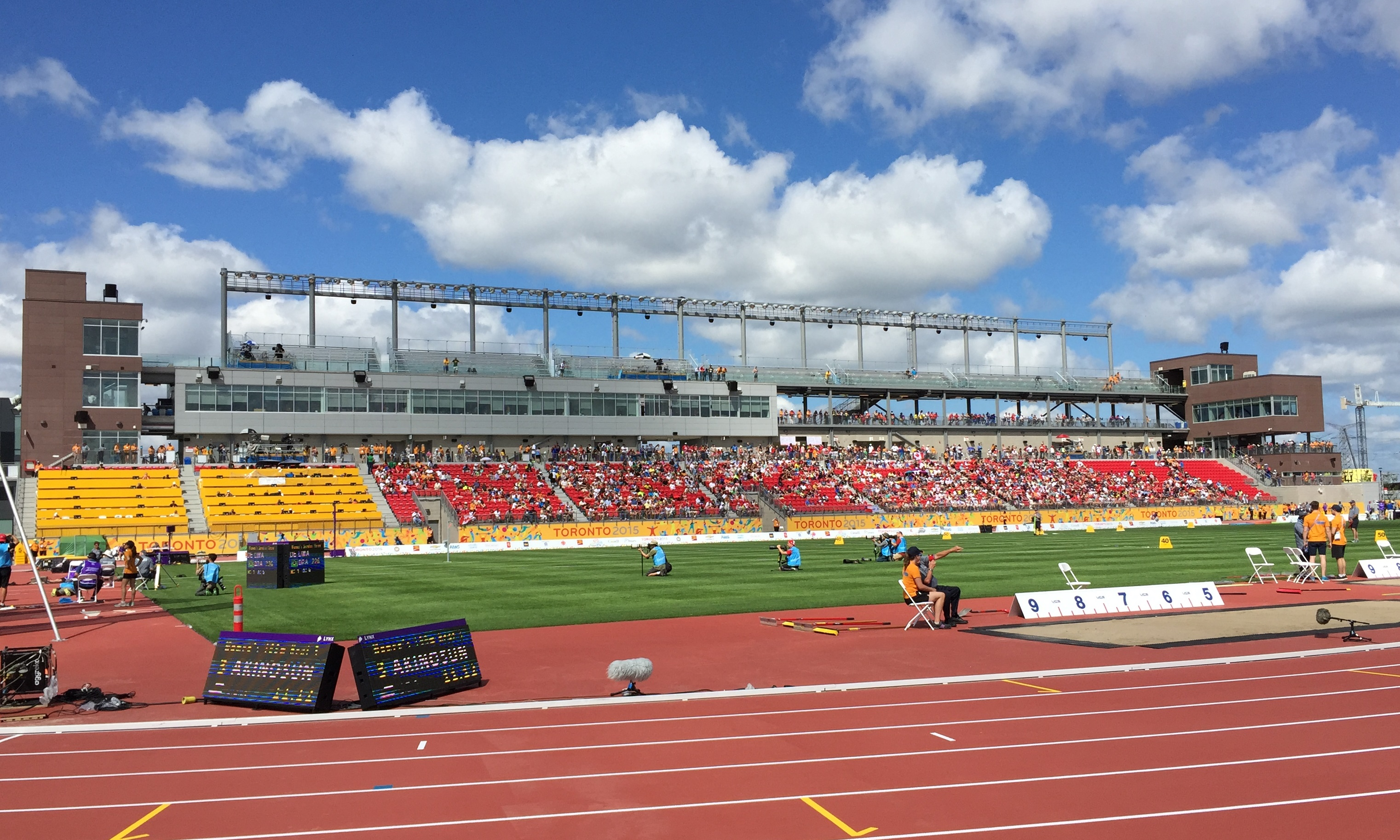
CIBC Pan Am / Parapan Am Athletics Stadium during the first day of athletics competition

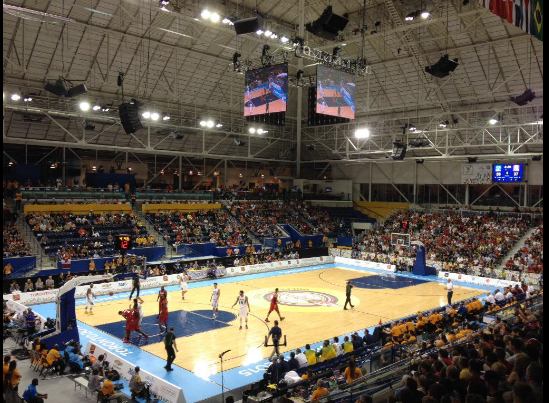
The Ryerson Athletic Centre during the basketball competitions

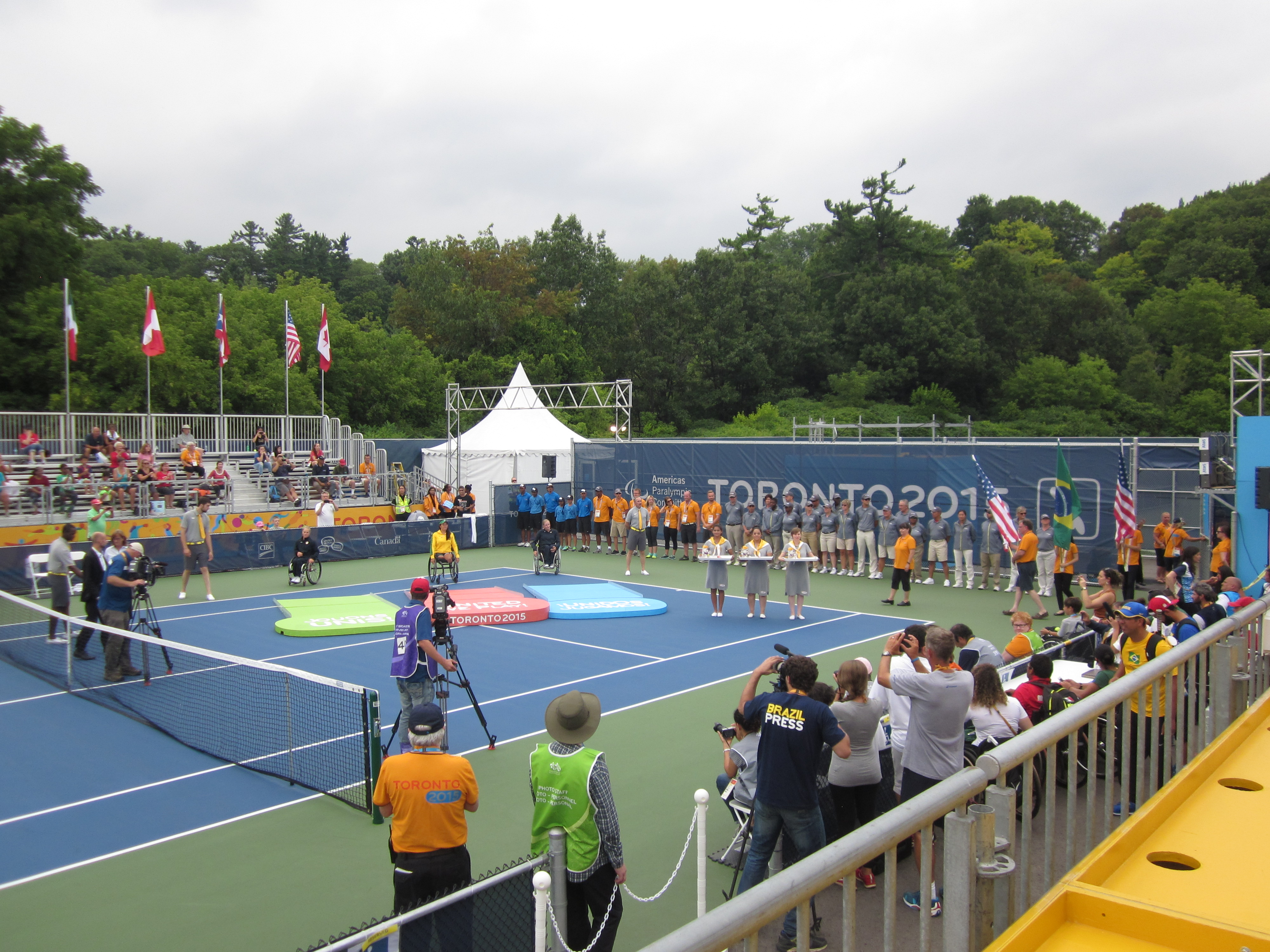
University of Toronto Scarborough Tennis Centre during the wheelchair tennis competition

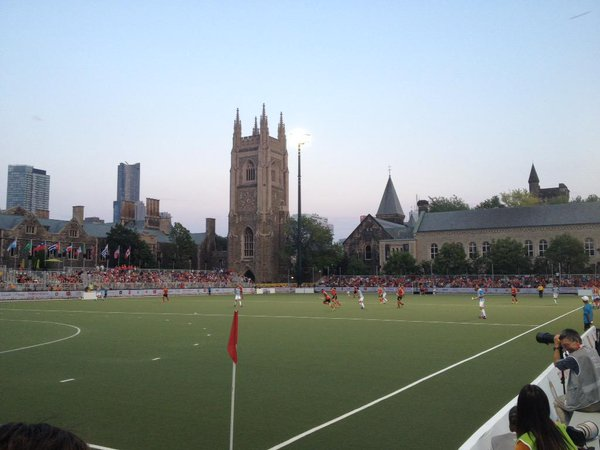
Pan Am / Parapan Am Fields

Venue	Sports		Capacity	Reference
Venue	Pan American Games	Parapan American Games	Capacity	Reference
Canadian Tennis Centre	Tennis	—	8,500^{1}	
Centennial Park Pan Am BMX Centre	Cycling (BMX)	—	2,000	
CIBC Pan Am / Parapan Am Aquatics Centre and Field House	Diving, Modern pentathlon (swimming), Swimming, Synchronized swimming Fencing, Modern pentathlon (fencing); Modern pentathlon (jumping/combined event)	Swimming Sitting volleyball	5,700 1,000 1,000	
CIBC Pan Am / Parapan Am Athletics Stadium	Athletics (track and field events)	Athletics (track and field events), Ceremony (opening)	12,000	
Nathan Phillips Square	—	Ceremony (closing)	2,000	
Pan Am Bowling Centre	Bowling	—	150	
Pan Am Ceremonies Venue	Ceremonies (opening/closing)	—	45,000	
Pan Am / Parapan Am Fields	Field hockey	Football 5-a-side, Football 7-a-side	2,000	
Ryerson Athletic Centre	Basketball	Wheelchair basketball	4,000	
Royal Canadian Yacht Club & Sugar Beach	Sailing	—	1,000^{2}	
St. John Paul II Catholic Secondary School	Roller sports (speed)	—		
University of Toronto Scarborough Tennis Centre	—	Wheelchair tennis	1,000	
Varsity Stadium	Archery	Archery	2,000	

1. A main grandstand court of 6,500 (was used for medal sessions only), plus seven other courts ranging in capacity from 200 to 1,625.
2. Only seating room available.

=== Haliburton ===
Venue	City	Sports		Capacity	Reference
Venue	City	Pan American Games	Parapan American Games	Capacity	Reference
Minden Wild Water Preserve	Minden Hills	Canoeing (slalom)	—	300 (standing)	

=== Hamilton and Niagara ===
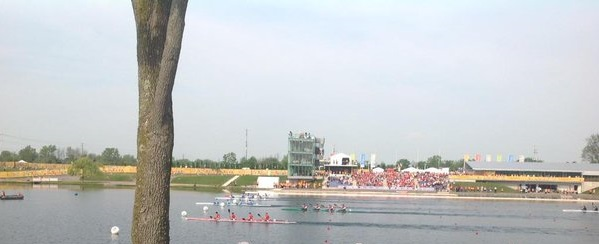
Welland Pan Am Flatwater Centre

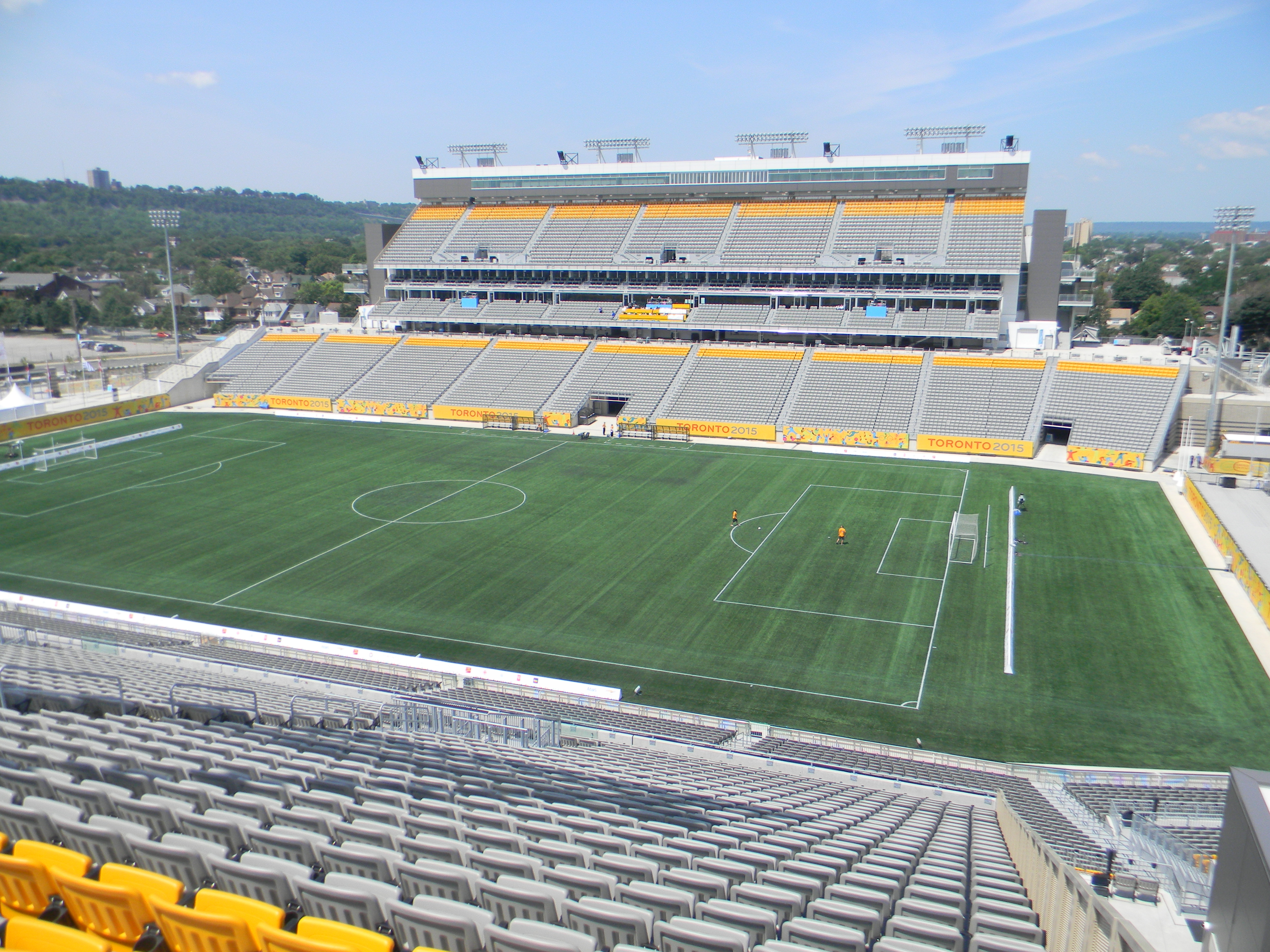
CIBC Hamilton Pan Am Soccer Stadium

Venue	City	Sports		Capacity	Reference
Venue	City	Pan American Games	Parapan American Games	Capacity	Reference
CIBC Hamilton Pan Am Soccer Stadium	Hamilton	Football	—	22,000	
Royal Canadian Henley Rowing Course	St. Catharines	Rowing	—	2,250	
Welland Pan Am Flatwater Centre	Welland	Canoeing (sprint)	—	1,100	

=== Peel Region, Halton and Simcoe ===
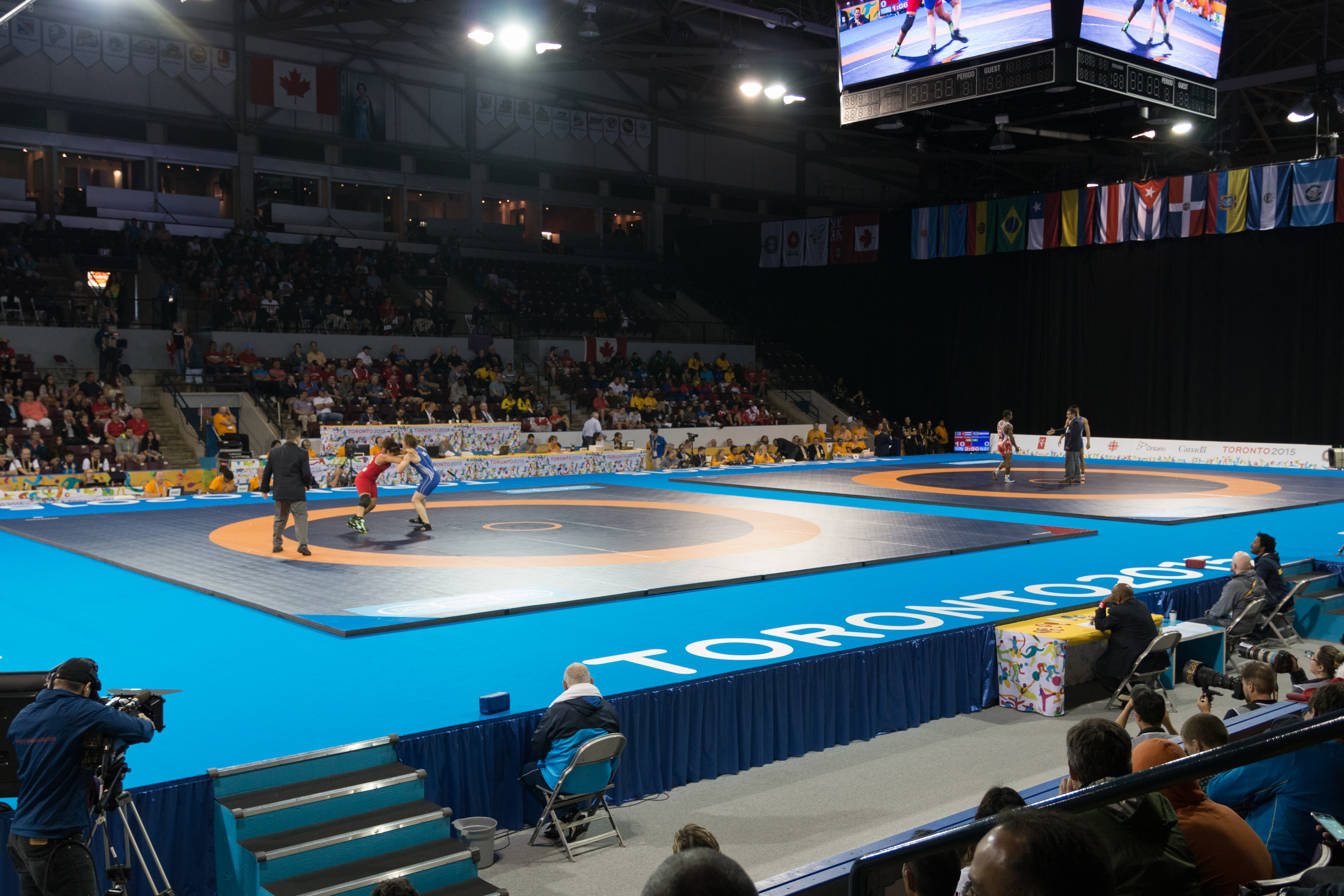
The Mississauga Sports Centre during the wrestling competition

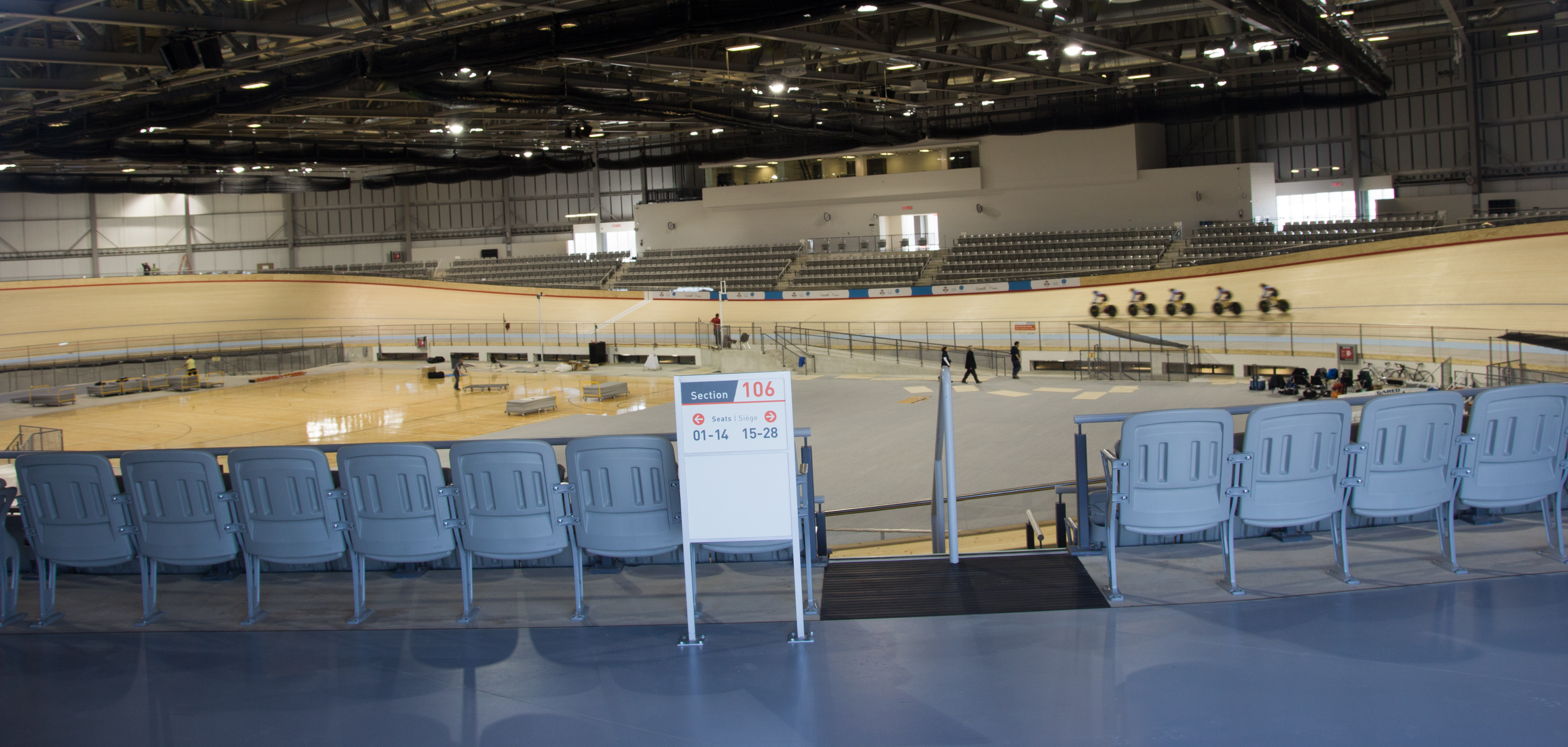
The Cisco Milton Pan Am / Parapan Am Velodrome

Venue	City	Sports		Capacity	Reference
Venue	City	Pan American Games	Parapan American Games	Capacity	Reference
Caledon Equestrian Park	Palgrave	Equestrian (Dressage, Eventing and Jumping)	—	4,000	
Cisco Milton Pan Am / Parapan Am Velodrome	Milton	Cycling (track)	Cycling (track)	2,000	
Milton Time Trial Course	Milton	Cycling (road cycling time trials)	Cycling (road cycling time trials)	1,000	
Hardwood Mountain Bike Park	Oro-Medonte	Cycling (mountain biking)	—	5,250	
Mississauga Sports Centre	Mississauga	Judo, Karate, Taekwondo, Wrestling	Goalball; Powerlifting, Wheelchair rugby	3,270 (Pan American Games); 3,150 (Wheelchair rugby); 1,000 (Goalball); 1,500 (Powerlifting)	
Pan Am Cross-Country Centre	Mono	Equestrian (Cross-Country portion of eventing)	—	5,000 (standing)	
Pan Am Shooting Centre	Innisfil	Shooting	—	450	

=== York Region and Durham ===
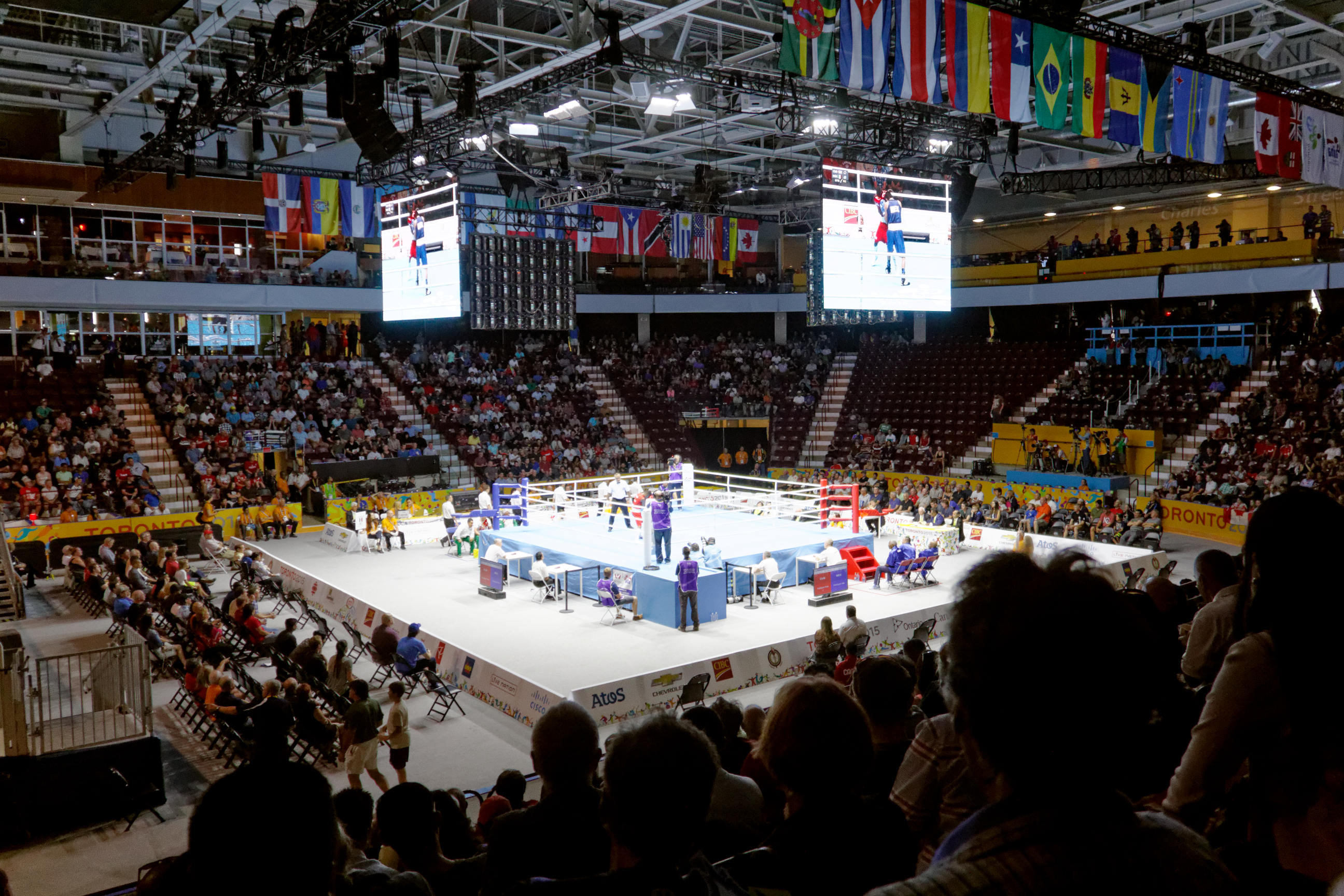
Oshawa Sports Centre during the boxing competitions

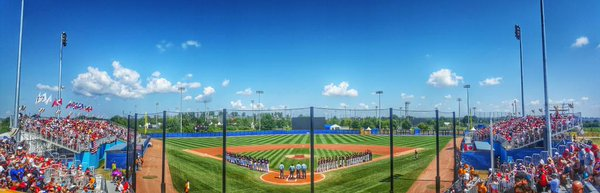
President's Choice Ajax Pan Am Ballpark

Venue	City	Sports		Capacity	Reference
Venue	City	Pan American Games	Parapan American Games	Capacity	Reference
Abilities Centre	Whitby	—	Boccia, Judo	750	
Angus Glen Golf Club	Markham	Golf	—	2,000 (standing)	
Atos Markham Pan Am / Parapan Am Centre	Markham	Badminton, Table tennis, Water polo	Table tennis	2,000/1,000; 2,000	
Oshawa Sports Centre	Oshawa	Boxing; Weightlifting	—	3,000; 2,250	
President's Choice Ajax Pan Am Ballpark	Ajax	Baseball; Softball	—	4,000/1,000; 3,000	

- Atos Markham Pan Am / Parapan Am Centre had a field house which seated 2,000 during the Pan American Games and 1,000 during the Parapan American Games. The facility also had a pool with a capacity of 2,000
- Pan Am Ball Park had two fields for baseball and one for softball. Each had additional standing room capacity.

=== Original Plan ===
The venue plan has been vastly changed from the original plan, with sixty percent of the 51 original venues being dropped. The venues were to be divided into three zones - Central Games Zone (Toronto, Mississauga, Brampton, Richmond Hill and Markham), West Games Zone (Hamilton) and East Games Zone (Oshawa, Ajax and Pickering). In addition there were venues located outside these zones in Barrie, St. Catharines, Palgrave, Minden and Welland. Ian Troop the CEO of the Organizing Committee said the venue plan was changed because, "the benefits of clustering are that you create economies of scale, the goal for our refined and improved venue plan is to reduce the operational complexities of the event, save costs, deliver an athlete-centred Games that facilitates great performance and create a much richer spectator experience.” Among the changes included the city's largest arena the Air Canada Centre being dropped, due to the organizing committee feeling none of the events warranted that amount of seating (20,000) and the desire to have full venues. Also the cities of Richmond Hill, Burlington and Brampton among others were dropped as host cities. Organizers later revealed a plan that put the majority of venues have into nine cluster zones within the Greater Toronto Area: the Toronto Pan Am Park, Abilities Centre cluster, Etobicoke, Markham, Mississauga, Scarborough, University of Toronto (downtown) and York University clusters. In addition to these there was fourteen venues that was to be outside the boundaries of the Greater Toronto Area. This plan was later replaced with the current venue proposal of five venue zones.
