= Cycling at the 2015 Pan American Games – Men's cross-country =

Men's cross-country at the 2015 Pan American Games
- Venue: Hardwood Mountain Bike Park
- Dates: July 12
- Competitors: 21 from 12 nations
- Winning time: 1:31:14

Medalists
Gold medal	Raphaël Gagné	Canada
Silver medal	Catriel Soto	Argentina
Bronze medal	Stephen Ettinger	United States

The men's cross-country competition of the cycling events at the 2015 Pan American Games was held on July 12 at the Hardwood Mountain Bike Park in Oro-Medonte.

== Schedule ==
All times are Eastern Standard Time (UTC-3).

Date	Time	Round
July 12, 2015	14:05	Final

== Results ==
Rank	Rider	Nation	Time
1st place, gold medalist(s)	Raphaël Gagné	Canada	1:31:14
2nd place, silver medalist(s)	Catriel Soto	Argentina	1:32:04
3rd place, bronze medalist(s)	Stephen Ettinger	United States	1:33:02
4	Derek Zandstra	Canada	1:34:06
5	Fabio Castañeda	Colombia	1:36:30
6	Spencer Paxson	United States	1:36:37
7	Rubens Donizete	Brazil	1:36:37
8	Andrey Fonseca	Costa Rica	1:37:56
9	Jose Ulloa	Mexico	1:39:03
10	Jose Albert Gonzalez	Ecuador	1:39:16
11	Luciano Caraccioli	Argentina	1:39:26
12	Jonathan Mejias	Venezuela	1:40:01
13	Jhonnthan de Leon	Guatemala	1:40:38
14	Javier Püschel	Chile	1:41:57
15	Patricio Farias	Chile	1:42:48
16	Luiz Cocuzzi	Brazil	1:44:49
17	Jose Escarcega	Mexico	1:45:01
18	Willian Tobay	Ecuador	LAP
19	Andres Gelpes	Uruguay	LAP
20	Kian Santana	Uruguay	LAP
	Luis Mejia	Colombia	DNF
