= 2014 UCI Mountain Bike & Trials World Championships – Men's cross-country eliminator =

== Results ==
#	Cyclist	Nation
1	Fabrice Mels	Belgium
2	Emil Lindgren	Sweden
3	Kévin Miquel	France
4	Daniel Federspiel	Austria
5	Martin Gluth	Germany
6	Catriel Andrés Soto	Argentina
7	Emil Linde	Sweden
8	Marcel Wildhaber	Switzerland
9	Ralph Näf	Switzerland
10	Simon Stiebjahn	Germany
11	Axel Lindh	Sweden
12	Krystof Bogar	Czech Republic
13	Thomas Litscher	Switzerland
14	Andrea Tiberi	Italy
15	Patrick Lüthi	Switzerland
16	Luiz Cocuzzi	Brazil
17	Matthias Wengelin	Sweden
18	Martin Setterberg	Sweden
19	Jeroen Van Eck	Netherlands
20	Sepp Freiburghaus	Switzerland
21	Gregor Raggl	Austria
22	Robin Thyrstedt	Sweden
23	Matiss Preimanis	Latvia
24	Sebastian Kartfjord	Norway
25	Philip Buys	South Africa
26	Paul Van der Ploeg	Australia
27	Miha Halzer	Slovenia
28	Max Wiklund-Hellstadius	Sweden
29	Martin Fanger	Switzerland
30	Raphael Gagne	Canada
31	Kevin Berginc	Slovenia
