= Cycling at the 2015 Pan American Games – Women's BMX =

Cycling – Women's BMX at the 2015 Pan American Games
- Venue: Centennial Park Pan Am BMX Centre
- Dates: July 10–11, 2015
- Competitors: 14 from 8 nations
- Winning time: 41.647

Medalists
Gold medal	Felicia Stancil; United States
Silver medal	Doménica Azuero; Ecuador
Bronze medal	Mariana Díaz; Argentina

The women's BMX competition of the cycling events at the 2015 Pan American Games will be held between July 10 and 11 at the Centennial Park Pan Am BMX Centre in Toronto, Ontario, Canada.

== Schedule ==
All times are Eastern Standard Time (UTC−3).

Date	Time	Round
July 10, 2015	11:35	Time Trial Qualifying
July 10, 2015	12:50	Time Trial Superfinal
July 11, 2015	14:17	Semifinals Run 1
July 11, 2015	14:52	Semifinals Run 2
July 11, 2015	15:17	Semifinals Run 3
July 11, 2015	16:10	Final

== Results ==
=== Time Trials ===
Rank	Name	Nation	Qualifying		Super-Final	
Rank	Name	Nation	Time	Rank	Time	Rank
1	Mariana Pajón	Colombia	39.430	1	39.914	1
2	Stefany Hernández	Venezuela	40.890	3	40.863	2
3	Felicia Stancil	United States	41.130	4	40.981	3
4	Gabriela Díaz	Argentina	41.570	5	41.966	4
5	Mariana Díaz	Argentina	41.940	6	42.100	5
6	Alise Willoughby	United States	40.230	2	1:11.443	6
7	Doménica Azuero	Ecuador	42.200	7	did not advance	
8	Priscilla Carnaval	Brazil	42.630	8	did not advance	
9	Amelia Walsh	Canada	43.430	9	did not advance	
10	Daina Tuchscherer	Canada	43.440	10	did not advance	
11	Thaynara Morosini Chaves	Brazil	44.120	11	did not advance	
12	María Osorno	Colombia	44.350	12	did not advance	
13	Rosario Aguilera	Chile	44.460	13	did not advance	
14	Karla Carrera Chala	Ecuador	45.620	14	did not advance	

=== Semifinal ===
First 4 riders in each semifinal qualify to the final.

Rank	Heat	Name	Nation	Race 1	Race 2	Race 3	Points	Notes
1	1	Mariana Pajón	Colombia	40.820 (1)	40.596 (1)	40.266 (1)	3	Q
2	1	Gabriela Díaz	Argentina	41.589 (2)	41.067 (2)	41.498 (2)	6	Q
3	1	Mariana Díaz	Argentina	42.104 (3)	41.746 (3)	42.864 (4)	10	Q
4	1	Priscilla Carnaval	Brazil	43.932 (5)	42.848 (4)	42.107 (3)	12	Q
5	1	María Osorno	Colombia	3:11.855 (7)	43.634 (5)	43.039 (5)	17	
6	1	Rosario Aguilera	Chile	1:21.421 (6)	47.073 (6)	45.834 (6)	18	
7	1	Amelia Walsh	Canada	43.904 (4)	REL (9)	1:18.217 (7)	20	
1	2	Alise Willoughby	United States	41.746 (2)	41.152 (2)	40.143 (1)	5	Q
2	2	Felicia Stancil	United States	41.199 (1)	41.423 (3)	40.672 (2)	6	Q
3	2	Stefany Hernández	Venezuela	:07.793 (7)	40.539 (1)	40.918 (3)	11	Q
4	2	Doménica Azuero	Ecuador	44.739 (5)	41.947 (4)	42.284 (4)	13	Q
5	2	Daina Tuchscherer	Canada	43.163 (3)	42.374 (5)	42.845 (6)	14	
6	2	Thaynara Morosini Chaves	Brazil	44.470 (4)	44.435 (6)	42.715 (5)	15	
7	2	Karla Carrera Chala	Ecuador	44.794 (6)	44.474 (7)	47.173 (7)	20	

=== Final ===
Rank	Name	Nation	Time	Gap	Notes
1st place, gold medalist(s)	Felicia Stancil	United States	41.647	-	
2nd place, silver medalist(s)	Doménica Azuero	Ecuador	41.948	+0.301	
3rd place, bronze medalist(s)	Mariana Díaz	Argentina	42.611	+0.964	
4	Priscilla Carnaval	Brazil	45.556	+3.909	
5	Gabriela Díaz	Argentina	50.145	+8.498	
6	Alise Willoughby	United States	:22.541	+40.894	
	Mariana Pajón	Colombia	DNF		
	Stefany Hernández	Venezuela	DNF		
