= 1999 UCI Mountain Bike World Championships – Men's downhill =

Rainbow jersey

== Results ==
place	bib	name	nat	t	t+
1st place, gold medalist(s)	1	Nicolas Vouilloz	France	5:03.49	
2nd place, silver medalist(s)	5	Mickael Pascal	France	5:09.91	6.41
3rd place, bronze medalist(s)	6	Eric Carter	United States	5:11.37	7.88
4	12	David Vázquez López	Spain	5:14.11	10.62
5	4	Cedric Gracia	France	5:15.26	11.76
6	25	Kristian Eriksson	Sweden	5:16.29	12.79
7	7	Shaun Palmer	United States	5:16.55	13.06
8	99	Fabien Barel	France	5:16.69	13.20
9	18	Crawford Carrick-A.	United Kingdom	5:18.39	14.90
10	61	Mickael Deldycke	France	5:18.39	14.90
11	3	Gerwin Peters	Netherlands	5:19.51	16.01
12	24	Mike King	United States	5:19.85	16.35
13	13	Bas de Bewer	Netherlands	5:20.34	16.84
14	9	Johan Engstrom	Sweden	5:21.03	17.53
15	19	Jurgen Beneke	Germany	5:21.85	18.36
16	10	Sean Mccarroll	Australia	5:22.31	18.82
17	8	Guillaume Koch	France	5:22.32	18.83
18	21	Jan Lundmann	Sweden	5:22.64	19.15
19	14	Rob Warner	United Kingdom	5:23.31	19.82
20	37	Florent Poussin	France	5:25.00	21.50
21	33	Markoff Berchtold	Brazil	5:25.61	22.12
22	51	Shaums March	United States	5:25.86	22.37
23	34	Brian Lopes	United States	5:26.62	23.13
24	17	John Kirkcaldie	New Zealand	5:27.05	23.55
25	28	Tomi Misser	Spain	5:27.22	23.73
26	22	Pau Misser	Spain	5:27.78	24.28
27	52	Eric Cseff	Canada	5:29.13	25.63
28	32	Tim Ponting	United Kingdom	5:29.58	26.09
29	55	Jacobo Santana	Spain	5:31.10	27.61
30	20	Corrado Herin	Italy	5:31.69	28.20
31	23	Ivan Oulego	Spain	5:33.23	29.73
32	31	Will Longden	United Kingdom	5:33.27	29.78
33	63	Antti-Pekka Laiho	Finland	5:33.41	29.91
34	44	Tobias Westman	Sweden	5:33.44	29.95
35	68	Michal Marosi	Czech Republic	5:34.43	30.93
36	62	Johan Dovemark	Sweden	5:34.98	31.49
37	97	Tommy Evensen	Norway	5:35.29	31.79
38	81	Rob Hewitt	Canada	5:35.92	32.43
39	26	Bruno Zanchi	Italy	5:36.05	32.55
40	15	Marcus Klausmann	Germany	5:37.72	34.23
41	67	John Lawlor	Ireland	5:37.91	34.41
42	29	Scott Sharples	Australia	5:37.91	34.41
43	74	Kenichi Nabeshima	Japan	5:38.29	34.80
44	65	Janez Grasic	Slovenia	5:39.75	36.26
45	35	Michel Kruiper	Netherlands	5:40.89	37.40
46	48	Glyn O'brien	Ireland	5:41.01	37.51
47	58	Daniel Simcik	Czech Republic	5:41.20	37.70
48	82	Gertje Tholen	Netherlands	5:41.48	37.99
49	36	Michel Joseph	Switzerland	5:41.60	38.11
50	73	Trevor Porter	Canada	5:41.98	38.49
51	56	Markus Petschenig	Austria	5:45.72	42.22
52	47	Claudio Caluori	Switzerland	5:46.18	42.68
53	42	Wilfred van der Haterd	Netherlands	5:46.55	43.06
54	89	Werner Salien	Belgium	5:49.07	45.57
55	92	Thomas Ryser	Switzerland	5:49.69	46.20
56	76	Takashi Tsukamoto	Japan	5:49.74	46.25
57	16	Kirt Voreis	United States	5:50.04	46.54
58	49	Ed Moseley	United Kingdom	5:50.42	46.92
59	46	Adrian Vesenbeck	Germany	5:50.48	46.98
60	115	Antti Hanhilahti	Finland	5:50.58	47.08
61	64	Vlastimil Hyncica	Czech Republic	5:51.05	47.56
62	72	Harald Deutschmann	Austria	5:51.22	47.72
63	45	Andrew Shandro	Canada	5:52.01	48.52
64	86	Bostjan Felc	Slovenia	5:53.37	49.87
65	106	Emil Carlson	Norway	5:53.68	50.18
66	98	Peter Drabik	Slovakia	5:56.68	53.19
67	54	Colin Bailey	United States	5:57.16	53.66
68	103	Andrew Yoong	Ireland	5:57.97	54.47
69	79	Stijn Deferm	Belgium	5:57.98	54.49
70	113	Inigo Del Hoyo	Spain	6:05.15	1:01.65
71	91	Sheldon Kilroe	South Africa	6:07.07	1:03.57
72	78	Jose Luis Perez	Mexico	6:07.58	1:04.09
73	80	Martin Pyffrader	Austria	6:10.92	1:07.42
74	85	Paul Gilsenan	Ireland	6:13.04	1:09.55
75	109	Tyronne Rumbelow	South Africa	6:13.16	1:09.67
76	43	Rene Wildhaber	Switzerland	6:15.01	1:11.51
77	87	Masashi Takemoto	Japan	6:25.03	1:21.53
78	96	Daniel Roura	Ecuador	6:26.95	1:23.45
79	75	Aljosa Martinjas	Slovenia	6:28.22	1:24.73
80	83	Tim Goodwin	South Africa	6:30.94	1:27.44
81	53	Frank Schneider	Germany	6:32.20	1:28.71
82	122	David O'Hara	Ireland	6:38.88	1:35.39
83	50	David Watson	Canada	6:59.31	1:55.81
84	102	Janez Golmajer	Slovenia	7:01.39	1:57.89
85	129	Antonio Carlos Serra	Brazil	7:10.16	2:06.67
86	94	Gary Barnard	South Africa	7:19.59	2:16.10
87	130	Julien Albert	Brazil	7:22.57	2:19.08
88	120	Stephen Bruen	Ireland	7:58.41	2:54.91
89	119	Jani Vesikko	Finland	8:34.87	3:31.38
90	127	Cesar Enriquez	Mexico	8:52.60	3:49.10
91	125	Ari Aaltonen	Finland	14:14.2	9:10.67
	123	Naoki Idegawa	Japan	DNF	
	101	Tommy Johansson	Sweden	DNF	
	131	David Gomez	Ecuador	DNS	
	100	Francisco Corvalan	Chile	DNS	

== See also ==
- 1999 UCI Mountain Bike World Championships
- 1999 UCI Mountain Bike World Cup
- UCI Mountain Bike & Trials World Championships
