= Daniela Campuzano =

Mexican mountain biker (born 1986)

Personal information
- Full name: Daniela Campuzano Chávez Peón
- Born: 21 October 1986 (age 39)

Cycling career
- Sport: Cycling
- Role: Rider
Medal record
Representing Mexico
Women's mountain biking
Pan American Games
Gold medal – first place	2019 Lima	Cross-country

Daniela Campuzano Chávez Peón (born 21 October 1986) is a Mexican mountain biker who qualified for the 2016 Summer Olympics held in Rio de Janeiro, Brazil. She carried the Mexican flag at the opening ceremony during the Parade of Nations.

== Personal life ==
Campuzano was born on 21 October 1986 in Mexico City, Mexico. She has a university degree in biology from the Autonomous University of Hidalgo State.

== Mountain biking career ==
Campuzano began mountain biking in 1998.

In the women's cross country event at the 2011 Pan American Games in Guadalajara, Jalisco, Mexico, she finished in ninth position.

At the 2013 Pan American cross country championships, held in Puebla, Mexico, she won the gold medal. She won the women's cross country event at the 2014 Central American and Caribbean Games held in Veracruz, Mexico, taking the gold medal in a time of one hour 23 minutes and 30 seconds. She won another gold medal at the Pan American cross country championships at the 2014 event in Brazil. At the 2014 UCI Mountain Bike & Trials World Championships held in Lillehammer, Norway she finished 14th in the women's cross country.

Campuzano won the Pan American cross country championships for the third time at the 2015 event in Cota, Colombia. In doing so she earned qualification for the 2016 Summer Olympics in Rio de Janeiro, Brazil. She competed at her second Pan American Games at the 2015 Games held in Toronto, Ontario, Canada. In the women's cross country she finished just outside of the medal in fourth place in a time of one hour 34 minutes 11 seconds.

In the 2016 UCI Mountain Bike World Cup she placed 16th in the event held in La Bresse, France, in a time of one hour 34 minutes and 23 seconds.

In May 2016 Mario Garcia de la Torre, head of the Mexican delegation, announced that Campuzano would carry the Mexican flag during the Parade of Nations at the opening ceremony. She competed in the women's cross-country event on 20 August. She was the first mountain biker to represent Mexico at an Olympic Games by finishing 16th

Campuzano won the 2019 Pan American cross country Championships and qualified for the 2020 Summer Olympics held in Tokyo, Japan. She placed 16th.

Olympic Games
Preceded by Hubertus von Fürstenberg-von Hohenlohe	Flagbearer for Mexico; Rio de Janeiro 2016	Succeeded by Germán Madrazo
