= 2010 UCI Mountain Bike & Trials World Championships – Women's downhill =

Rainbow jersey

The women's downhill mountain biking event at the 2010 UCI Mountain Bike & Trials World Championships in Mont Sainte-Anne took place on 5 September.

== Results - Elite ==
rank	race nr	name	nat	birth	age	speed		split 1		split 2		finish	gap
1	4	Tracy Moseley	Great Britain	12.04.1979	31	58.885	(3)	3:31.54	(1)	4:33.22	(1)	5:17.47	
2	3	Sabrina Jonnier	France	19.08.1981	29	60.854	(1)	3:37.85	(2)	4:40.37	(2)	5:24.97	7.50
3	1	Emmeline Ragot	France	27.05.1986	24	58.257	(6)	3:39.75	(3)	4:43.13	(3)	5:28.11	10.64
4	2	Floriane Pugin	France	17.04.1989	21	58.188	(7)	3:41.07	(4)	4:44.05	(4)	5:29.81	12.34
5	6	Mio Suemasa	Japan	01.04.1983	27	57.473	(9)	3:41.82	(5)	4:45.29	(6)	5:30.26	12.79
6	5	Myriam Nicole	France	08.02.1990	21	57.206	(10)	3:42.40	(6)	4:45.05	(5)	5:31.45	13.98
7	10	Rachel Atherton	Great Britain	06.12.1987	23	58.709	(5)	3:43.77	(7)	4:47.45	(8)	5:33.80	16.33
8	27	Leigh Donovan	United States	11.12.1971	39	58.991	(2)	3:45.35	(8)	4:47.02	(7)	5:34.05	16.58
9	8	Claire Buchar	Canada	26.04.1978	32	58.779	(4)	3:48.82	(14)	4:49.72	(9)	5:35.59	18.12
10	22	Jill Kintner	United States	24.10.1981	29	57.608	(8)	3:45.93	(9)	4:49.88	(10)	5:38.29	20.82
11	17	Anita Ager-Wick	Norway	31.08.1978	32	54.029	(22)	3:47.71	(11)	4:53.58	(11)	5:40.39	22.92
12	9	Petra Bernhard	Austria	18.11.1980	30	55.809	(14)	3:50.00	(17)	4:57.40	(13)	5:44.28	26.81
13	13	Fionn Griffiths	Great Britain	27.08.1982	28	55.306	(19)	3:48.39	(13)	4:57.28	(12)	5:44.67	27.20
14	14	Emilie Siegenthaler	Switzerland	19.09.1986	24	55.120	(20)	3:47.97	(12)	5:02.40	(15)	5:51.67	34.20
15	11	Harriet Rucknagel	Germany	11.10.1988	22	55.431	(17)	3:59.14	(19)	5:06.33	(17)	5:54.73	37.26
16	15	Melissa Buhl	United States	25.01.1982	29	56.159	(13)	3:49.57	(16)	5:02.31	(14)	5:55.48	38.01
17	21	Anita Molcik	Austria	12.11.1980	30	55.651	(15)	3:53.44	(18)	5:05.03	(16)	5:55.71	38.24
18	20	Jacqueline Harmony	United States	07.03.1978	32	54.539	(21)	3:59.63	(20)	5:08.92	(19)	5:57.42	39.95
19	24	Anne Laplante	Canada	15.10.1990	20	57.172	(11)	4:05.66	(21)	5:19.49	(21)	6:08.55	51.08
20	19	Luana Maria De Souza-Oliveira	Brazil	28.05.1991	19	55.337	(18)	4:05.71	(22)	5:18.94	(20)	6:08.64	51.17
21	12	Micayla Gatto	Canada	21.08.1988	22	49.066	(23)	3:47.64	(10)	5:08.75	(18)	6:11.04	53.57
22	23	Rebecca McQueen	Canada	17.12.1985	25	55.556	(16)	4:27.83	(23)	5:38.18	(22)	6:27.27	1:09.80
23	18	Miranda Miller	Canada	02.03.1990	21	56.678	(12)	3:49.36	(15)	8:25.86	(23)	9:16.99	3:59.52
	16	Tomoko Iizuka	Japan	22.05.1979	31							DNF	
	25	Vaea Verbeek	Canada	25.11.1990	20							DNS	
	26	Kjersten Lone	Canada	04.01.1991	20							DNS	

== Results - Juniors ==
rank	race nr	name	nat	birth	age	speed		split 1		split 2		finish	gap
1	13	Lauren Rosser	Canada	04.10.1993	17	54.843	(4)	4:04.85	(1)	5:12.32	(1)	5:59.55	
2	2	Fanny Lombard	France	13.03.1992	18	54.782	(5)	4:08.34	(4)	5:23.36	(4)	6:13.50	13.95
3	3	Julie Berteaux	France	25.05.1992	18	57.373	(1)	4:06.20	(2)	5:18.33	(2)	6:19.74	20.19
4	5	Holly Baarspul	Australia	30.10.1992	18	53.911	(6)	4:24.49	(6)	5:34.52	(5)	6:27.33	27.78
5	7	Sarah Atkin	New Zealand	22.03.1993	17	56.482	(2)	4:10.13	(5)	5:35.49	(6)	6:27.57	28.02
6	8	Charlotte Clouston	New Zealand	27.07.1993	17	51.401	(9)	4:34.40	(7)	5:53.72	(7)	6:47.60	48.05
7	12	Kelsey Begg	Canada	01.02.1993	18	52.110	(8)	4:49.77	(9)	6:06.38	(8)	6:59.64	1:00.09
8	6	Emily Hockey	Australia	12.07.1993	17	53.587	(7)	4:49.12	(8)	6:12.25	(9)	7:08.53	1:08.98
9	11	Kelsey Anderson	United States	16.02.1992	19	48.725	(10)	4:50.16	(10)	6:14.10	(10)	7:14.22	1:14.67
10	9	Madeline Taylor	New Zealand	04.08.1993	17	55.494	(3)	4:07.13	(3)	5:20.30	(3)	7:32.21	1:32.66

== See also ==
UCI Mountain Bike & Trials World Championships
