= Ontario Place West Channel =

Water sports venue in Toronto, Ontario

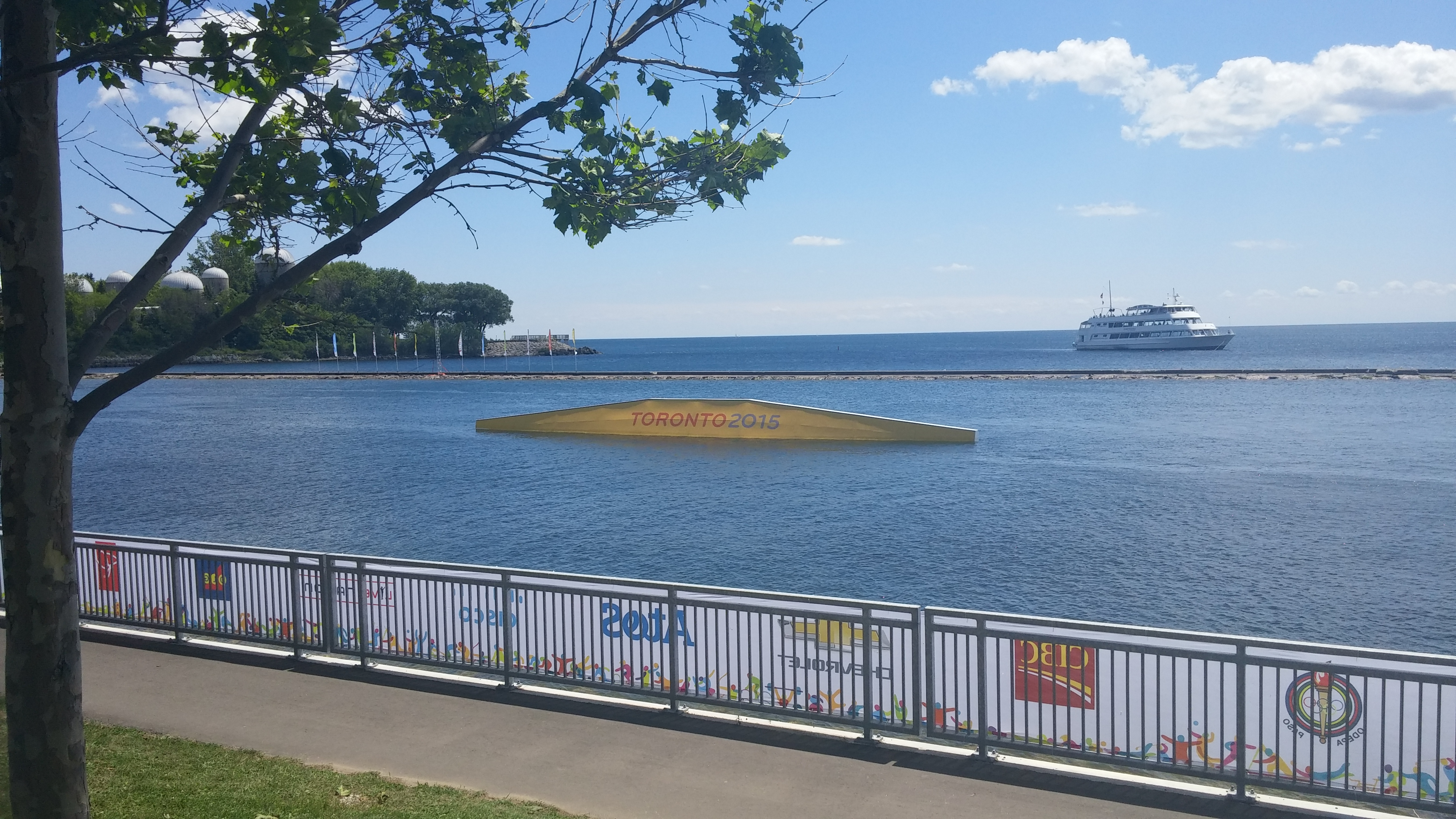

- Location in Toronto Location in Ontario Location in Canada
- Location: Lake Ontario, Toronto, Ontario, Canada
- Coordinates: 43.62939°N 79.42743°W
- Owner: City of Toronto
- Public transit: Exhibition GO Station; Exhibition Loop; 509 Harbourfront; 511 Bathurst; 29B/C/D Dufferin; 193 Exhibition Rocket

Construction
- Renovated: 2005–2006, 2014

Tenants
- Argonaut Rowing Club (1921–Present); Toronto International Dragon Boat Race Festival (1989–2006); Toronto Triathlon Festival (2012–Present); 1953 IWWF World Waterski Championships; 1979 IWWF World Waterski Championships; 2006 IDBF Dragon Boat Racing Club Crew World Championships; 2011 ICF Dragon Boat Club Crew World Championships; 2015 Pan American Games; 2015 Parapan American Games; 2016 WWA Wakeboard World Championships; 2017 WWA Wakeboard World Championships

The Ontario Place West Channel, also known as the Toronto Western Beaches Watercourse, is a "flat water" training and competition centre for rowing, paddling, and water sports located on the shoreline of Lake Ontario in Toronto, Ontario, Canada.

== Description ==
The watercourse is situated in a man-made channel between the west island of Ontario Place and Exhibition Place, fronting Marilyn Bell Park just west of downtown Toronto. The venue is accessible through Exhibition Place by two pedestrian bridges over Lake Shore Boulevard and the Martin Goodman Trail, which runs alongside the course.

Home of the Argonaut Rowing Club since 1921, the watercourse was used for national water skiing championships until the 1950s and for shows during the Canadian National Exhibition from the 1950s to the mid-1990s including the World Water Skiing Championships in 1953 and 1979 and was the host of the Wakeboard World Championships in 2016 and 2017. It is also one of the viewing locations for the annual Canadian International Air Show.

=== Toronto 2015 Pan and Parapan American Games ===
For the Toronto 2015 Pan Am and Parapan Am Games, the facility hosted the triathlon, open-water swimming, waterskiing, and wakeboarding events. In conjunction with adjacent section of Lake Shore Boulevard, the venue also hosted the seating and start/finish line for road cycling, marathon and the 20-kilometre race walk.

== Recent upgrades ==
During the winter of 2005–2006, Waterfront Toronto upgraded 650 m of the western section of the channel to meet International Dragon Boat Federation standards to host the Dragon Boat Racing Club Crew World Championships on August 8 to the 13, 2006. This included widening the facility to a 135-m-wide watercourse and a larger breakwater separating it from the lake.

Further upgrades to the eastern section of the channel took place in 2014 after Toronto was awarded the 2015 Pan American Games; 600 m of the south channel breakwater wall and other water’s-edge structures were restored to allow required wave attenuation for current International Waterski & Wakeboard Federation waterski and wakeboard international competition standards.

== See also ==
- Venues of the 2015 Pan American and Parapan American Games
