= 2014 UCI Mountain Bike & Trials World Championships – Women's cross-country =

== Final result ==
#	Cyclist	Nation		Time
1	Catharine Pendrel	Canada	in	1 h 31 min 30 s
2	Irina Kalentieva	Russia		1 h 31 min 51 s
3	Lea Davison	United States		1 h 32 min 13 s
4	Tanja Žakelj	Slovenia		1 h 32 min 42 s
5	Blaža Klemenčič	Slovenia		1 h 33 min 16 s
6	Emily Batty	Canada		1 h 33 min 39 s
7	Maja Włoszczowska	Poland		1 h 33 min 42 s
8	Sabine Spitz	Germany		1 h 34 min 35 s
9	Gunn-Rita Dahle Flesjå	Norway		1 h 34 min 50 s
10	Julie Bresset	France		1 h 34 min 56 s
11	Eva Lechner	Italy		1 h 35 min 42 s
12	Annie Last	United Kingdom		1 h 35 min 47 s
13	Ekateryna Anoshina	Russia		1 h 36 min 28 s
14	Daniela Campuzano	Mexico		1 h 37 min 07 s
15	Rebecca Henderson	Australia		1 h 37 min 16 s
16	Anna Szafraniec	Poland		1 h 37 min 23 s
17	Lene Byberg	Norway		1 h 37 min 40 s
18	Annika Langvad	Denmark		1 h 38 min 04 s
19	Katarzyna Solus-Miśkowicz	Poland		1 h 38 min 38 s
20	Githa Michiels	Belgium		1 h 38 min 53 s
21	Kateřina Nash	Czech Republic		1 h 39 min 30 s
22	Qinglan Shi	China		1 h 40 min 20 s
23	Janka Keseg Stevkova	Slovakia		1 h 40 min 37 s
24	Georgia Gould	United States		1 h 40 min 45 s
25	Kate Fluker	New Zealand		1 h 40 min 56 s
26	Esther Süss	Switzerland		1 h 40 min 59 s
27	Katrin Leumann	Switzerland		1 h 41 min 07 s
28	Nina Wrobel	Germany		1 h 41 min 07 s
29	Alice Pirard	Belgium		1 h 41 min 41 s
30	Elisabeth Osl	Austria		1 h 42 min 33 s
31	Chloe Woodruff	United States		1 h 42 min 47 s
32	Heidi Rosasen Sandsto	Norway		1 h 42 min 51 s
33	Chengyuan Ren	China		1 h 42 min 59 s
34	Sandra Walter	Canada		1 h 43 min 03 s
35	Tereza Huříková	Czech Republic		1 h 43 min 20 s
36	Serena Calvetti	Italy		1 h 44 min 01 s
37	Raiza Goulao-Henrique	Brazil		1 h 44 min 10 s
38	Erin Huck	United States		1 h 44 min 20 s
39	Kathrin Stirnemann	Switzerland		1 h 44 min 53 s
40	Agustina Apaza	Argentina		1 h 45 min 43 s
41	Anne Terpstra	Netherlands		1 h 46 min 12 s
42	Karla Stepanova	Czech Republic		
43	Adriana Rojas	Costa Rica		
44	Mary Mcconneloug	United States		
45	Mikaela Kofman	Canada		
46	Kajsa Snihs	Sweden		
47	Laura Morfin Macouzet	Mexico		
48	Anna Oberparleiter	Italy		
49	Evelyn Dong	United States		
50	Paula Gorycka	Poland		
51	Isabella Moreira Lacerda	Brazil		
52	Lucie Vesela	Czech Republic		
53	Rocio Rodriguez	Spain		
54	Barbara Benkó	Hungary		
55	Erika Gramiscelli	Brazil		
56	Maaris Meier	Estonia		
57	Jitka Skarnitzlova	Czech Republic		
58	Alexandra Serrano Rodriguez	Ecuador		
59	Sonja Kallio	Finland		
60	Eri Yonamine	Japan		
61	Peta Mullens	Australia		
62	Elisabeth Sveum	Norway		
63	Mio Suemasa	Japan		
64	Esra Kurkcu	Turkey		
