= 2011 UCI Mountain Bike & Trials World Championships – Men's cross-country =

Rainbow jersey

== Results - Elite ==
place	race nr	name	nat	birth	age	time
1	2	Jaroslav Kulhavý	Czech Republic	birth	age	time
2	3	Nino Schurter	Switzerland	birth	age	time
3	4	Julien Absalon	France	birth	age	time

== Results - U23 ==
place	race nr	name	nat	birth	age	time
1	?	name	Switzerland	birth	age	time
2	?	name	Switzerland	birth	age	time
3	?	name	Switzerland	birth	age	time

== Results - Junior ==
place	race nr	name	nat	birth	age	time
1	?	name	Switzerland	birth	age	time
2	?	name	Switzerland	birth	age	time
3	?	name	Switzerland	birth	age	time

== See also ==
UCI Mountain Bike & Trials World Championships
