= 1999 UCI Mountain Bike World Championships – Women's downhill =

Rainbow jersey

== Results ==
| place | bib | name | nat | t | t+ |
|---|---|---|---|---|---|
| 1st place, gold medalist(s) | 1 | Anne-Caroline Chausson | France | 5:52.26 | |
| 2nd place, silver medalist(s) | 3 | Katja Repo | Finland | 5:53.87 | 1.61 |
| 3rd place, bronze medalist(s) | 13 | Sari Jorgensen | Switzerland | 6:07.98 | 15.71 |
| 4 | 4 | Leigh Donovan | United States | 6:10.32 | 18.06 |
| 5 | 16 | Tracy Moseley | United Kingdom | 6:11.31 | 19.04 |
| 6 | 8 | Marla Streb | United States | 6:13.20 | 20.93 |
| 7 | 6 | Marielle Saner | Switzerland | 6:18.45 | 26.19 |
| 8 | 15 | Malin Lindgren | Sweden | 6:23.84 | 31.57 |
| 9 | 25 | Karen van Meerbeck | United Kingdom | 6:26.40 | 34.13 |
| 10 | 21 | Tara Llanes | United States | 6:28.85 | 36.59 |
| 11 | 11 | Giovanna Bonazzi | Italy | 6:29.00 | 36.74 |
| 12 | 14 | Nolvenn le Caer | France | 6:29.74 | 37.47 |
| 13 | 12 | Sarah Stieger | Switzerland | 6:31.23 | 38.96 |
| 14 | 22 | Katrina Miller | Australia | 6:35.73 | 43.47 |
| 15 | 9 | Lisa Sher | United States | 6:37.61 | 45.34 |
| 16 | 7 | Elke Brustaert | United States | 6:39.17 | 46.90 |
| 17 | 10 | Helen Mortimer | United Kingdom | 6:41.78 | 49.52 |
| 18 | 19 | Emma Guy | United Kingdom | 6:44.49 | 52.22 |
| 19 | 24 | Lorraine Blancher | Canada | 6:49.96 | 57.69 |
| 20 | 49 | Petra Winterhalder | Germany | 6:51.46 | 59.20 |
| 21 | 26 | Mami Masuda | Japan | 6:51.55 | 59.28 |
| 22 | 33 | Miriam Blas | Spain | 6:51.58 | 59.32 |
| 23 | 2 | Missy Giove | United States | 7:06.54 | 1:14.27 |
| 24 | 34 | Sylvie Allen | Canada | 7:15.33 | 1:23.07 |
| 25 | 23 | Helena Kurandova | Czech Republic | 7:16.05 | 1:23.78 |
| 26 | 17 | Florentina Moser | Austria | 7:17.61 | 1:25.34 |
| 27 | 42 | Marit Gystol | Norway | 7:18.76 | 1:26.49 |
| 28 | 30 | Tera Meade | Canada | 7:19.67 | 1:27.40 |
| 29 | 40 | Sofia Fagerstrom | Sweden | 7:23.95 | 1:31.68 |
| 30 | 36 | Shelley Webb (cyclist) | Australia | 7:47.86 | 1:55.59 |
| 31 | 29 | Adele Croxon | United Kingdom | 7:49.41 | 1:57.14 |
| 32 | 32 | Cecile Gambin | Canada | 7:51.91 | 1:59.65 |
| 33 | 46 | Lene Hansen (cyclist) | Norway | 8:21.01 | 2:28.74 |
| 34 | 47 | Miwa Sakamoto | Japan | 9:15.15 | 3:22.88 |
| 35 | 50 | Karen Dallimore | South Africa | 11:56.2 | 6:03.95 |
| – | 44 | Gabriela Andelius | Sweden | DNF | |
| – | 28 | Daamiann Skelton | Canada | DNF | |
| – | 5 | Mercedes Gonzalez | Spain | DNS | |

== See also ==
- 1999 UCI Mountain Bike World Championships
- 1999 UCI Mountain Bike World Cup
- UCI Mountain Bike & Trials World Championships
