= Erin Huck =

American cross-country mountain biker

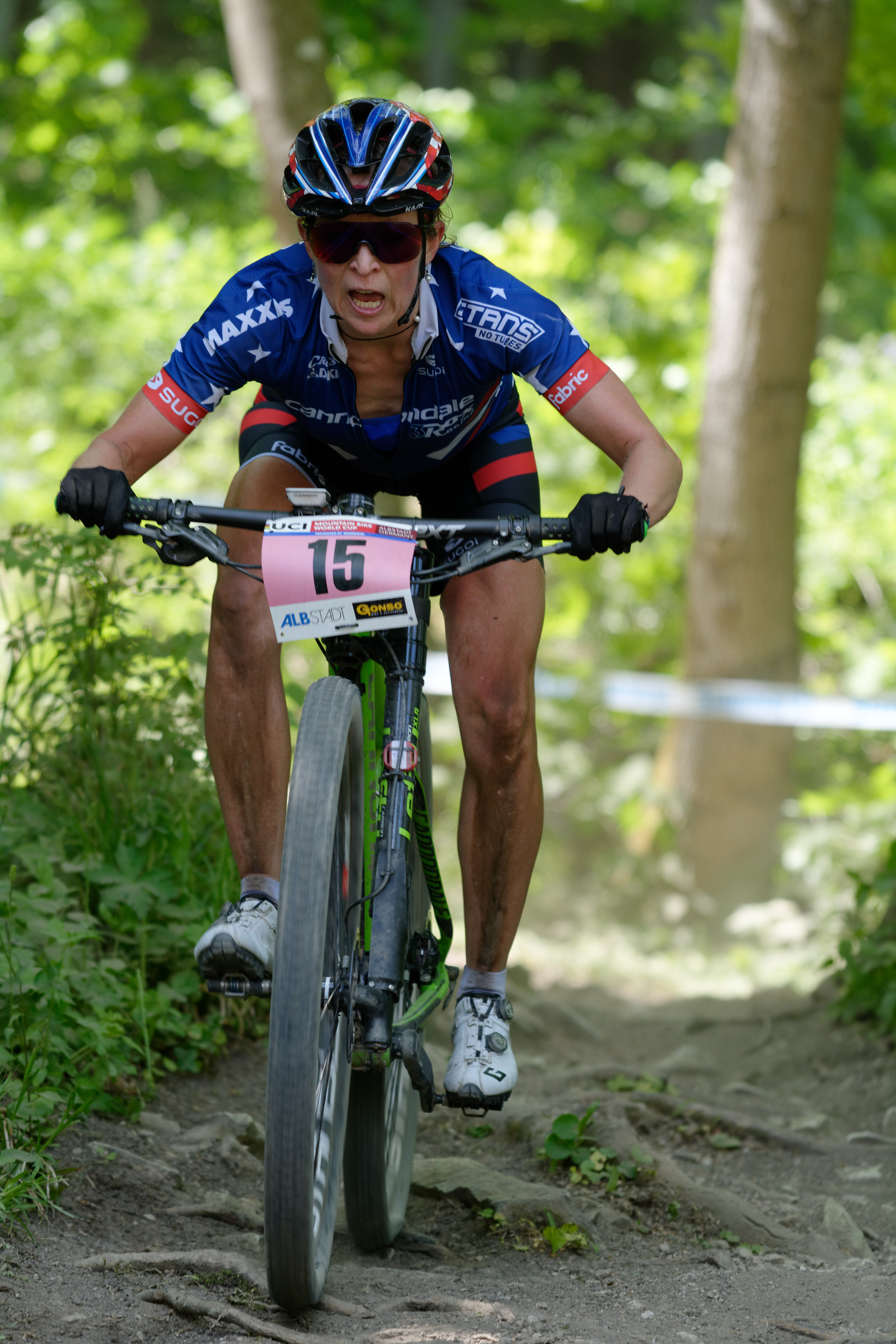
- Huck in 2017

Personal information
- Born: June 17, 1981 (age 45) Estes Park, Colorado, U.S.

Cycling career
- Sport: Cycling
- Discipline: Mountain bike racing
- Role: Rider
- Rider type: Cross-country
Medal record
Women's mountain bike racing
Representing United States
Pan American Games
Bronze medal – third place	2015 Toronto	Cross-country

Erin Huck (born June 17, 1981) is an American cross-country mountain biker. She competed in the women's cross-country event at the 2020 Summer Olympics. Huck also competed in the 2015 Pan American Games, winning bronze.
