= Nestor Hammarlund =

Swedish politician

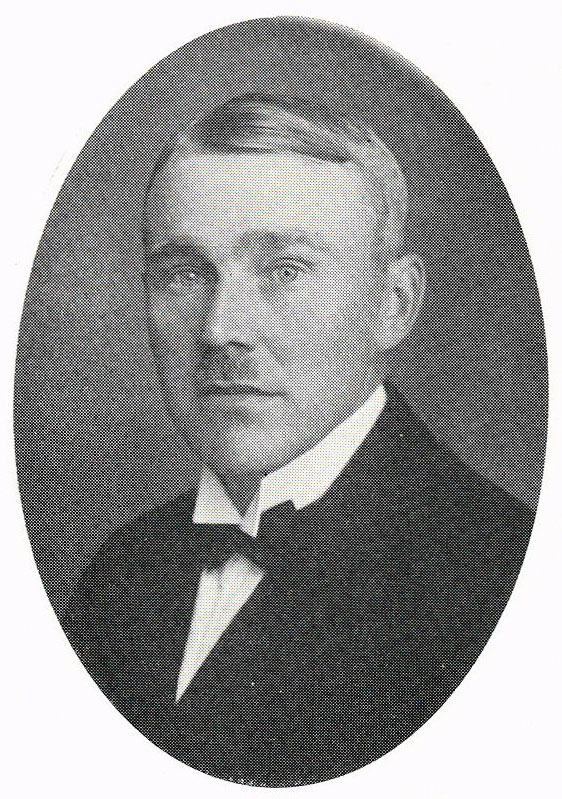
Hammarlund in 1931

Nestor Hammarlund (28 August 1888 – 30 January 1966) was a Swedish politician. He was born in Barkåkra, Scania, and was a member of the Centre Party.
