= John Kirkcaldie =

New Zealand racing cyclist

Personal information
- Full name: John Kirkcaldie

Cycling career
- Sport: Cycling
- Discipline: Mountain bike racing
- Role: Rider

John Kirkcaldie is a retired professional downhill mountain biker from New Zealand. Kirkaldie won the 2005 New Zealand National Championships in both downhill and four cross, and finished third in the NORBA downhill series overall. He also took fourth place overall in the downhill in the 2004 NORBA series and sixth place in downhill at the 2004 UCI World Cup Race in Calgary, BC (Canada). He was also the 2004 New Zealand National Champion, and took NORBA championships in 2000 and 2001.

Following his retirement from competitive cycling in 2006, he worked in carpentry.
