= Stephen Ettinger =

American cyclist

Personal information
- Born: 28 April 1989 (age 37) Cashmere, Washington
- Height: 1.82 m (6 ft 0 in)
- Weight: 65 kg (143 lb)

Cycling career
- Sport: Cycling
- Discipline: Mountain
- Role: Rider

Professional teams
- 2012–2014: BMC Racing Team
- 2016: Rally Cycling

Major wins
- 2013 US Professional Cross-Country MTB National Championships, 2014 Elite Pan-American MTB Championships
Medal record
Men's mountain bike cycling
Representing United States
Pan American Games
Bronze medal – third place	2015 Toronto	Cross-country

Stephen Ettinger (born April 28, 1989) is an American cyclist. Specializing in mountain biking, Ettinger competed at the Pan American Games in 2015, and won the bronze medal in the cross-country event. Ettinger has won multiple US Mountain Bike National Championships, including the 2011 U23 Cross-Country National Championship (Ketchum, ID), 2013 Professional Men's Cross-Country National Championship (Bear Mountain, PA), and 2014 Professional Men's Short-Track Cross-Country National Championship (Bear Mountain, PA). He was both the Cross-Country MTB and Short-Track Cross-Country MTB Collegiate National Champion in 2010, representing Montana State University. He was the 2014 UCI Pan-American MTB Champion (Barbacena, Brazil).

Stephen graduated from the University of California, San Francisco School of Medicine in 2022 and is currently an Emergency Medicine resident at the UW Medicine University of Washington Affiliated Hospitals in Seattle, Washington.
