= Elias Aguirre =

Swedish politician (born 1984)

Member of the Riksdag
- Incumbent
- Assumed office 28 September 2026
- Constituency: Östergötland County

Personal details
- Born: 1984 (age 41–42) Nacka, Stockholm, Sweden
- Party: Social Democratic Party

Olof Elias Hammarlund Aguirre (born 1984) is a Swedish politician and Member of the Riksdag. A member of the Social Democratic Party, he has represented Östergötland County since September 2026.

Aguirre was born in 1984 in Nacka, Stockholm. His father is a Uruguayan refugee and his mother is Swedish. His parents separated when he was two years old and he was brought by his single mother in Hallonbergen. He is a social and cultural analyst.

Aguirre was a member of the municipal council in Linköping and a municipal commissioner (kommunalråd). He was elected to the Riksdag at the 2026 general election.
