= Andrea Tiberi =

Italian cyclist

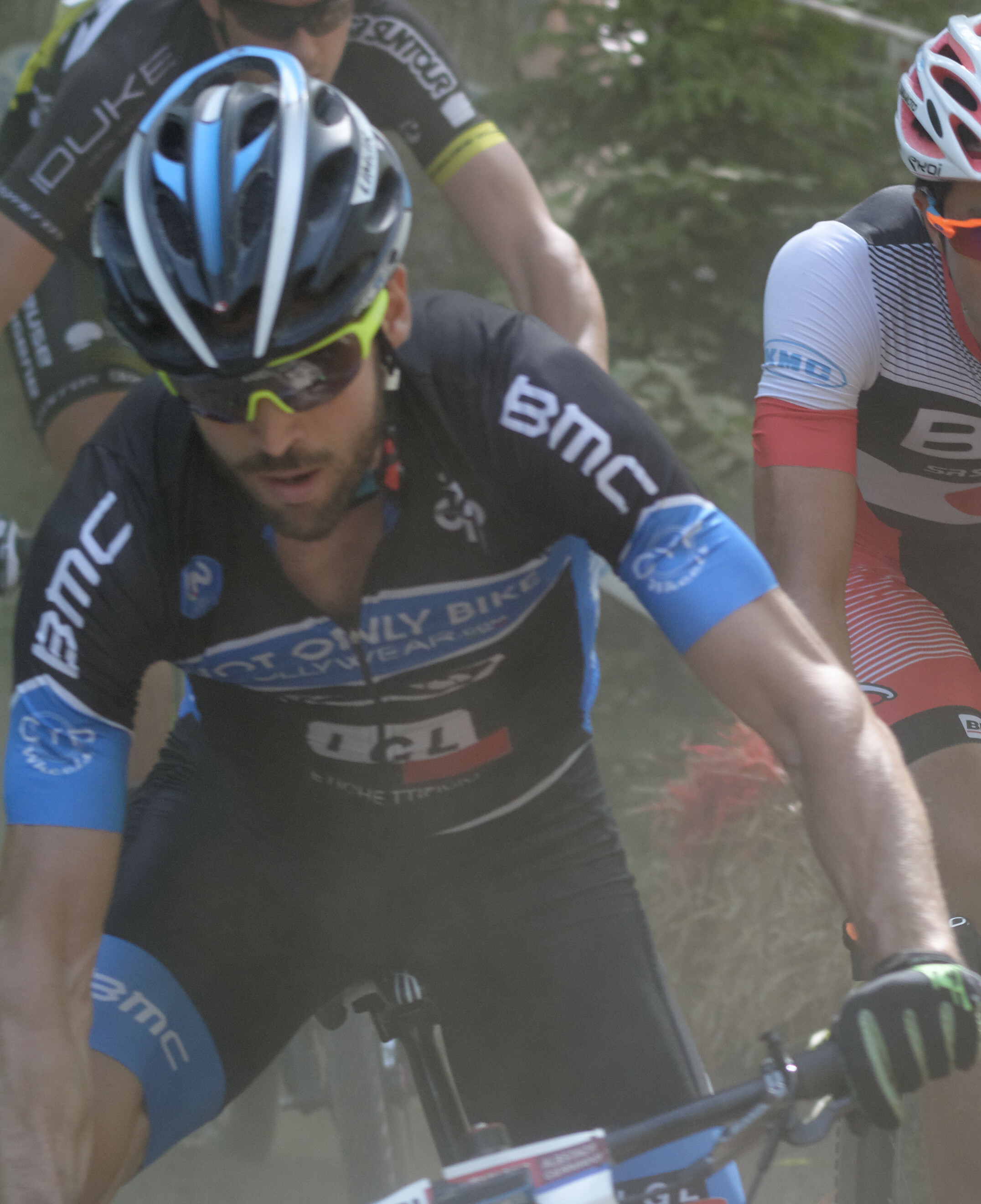
- Tiberi in 2017

Personal information
- Born: 15 November 1985 (age 40) Turin, Italy

Cycling career
- Sport: Cycling
- Discipline: Mountain bike
- Role: Rider

Andrea Tiberi (born 15 November 1985) is an Italian mountain bike racer. He rode at the cross-country event at the 2016 Summer Olympics.
