= Centennial Park Pan Am BMX Centre =

BMX cycling facility in Toronto, Ontario

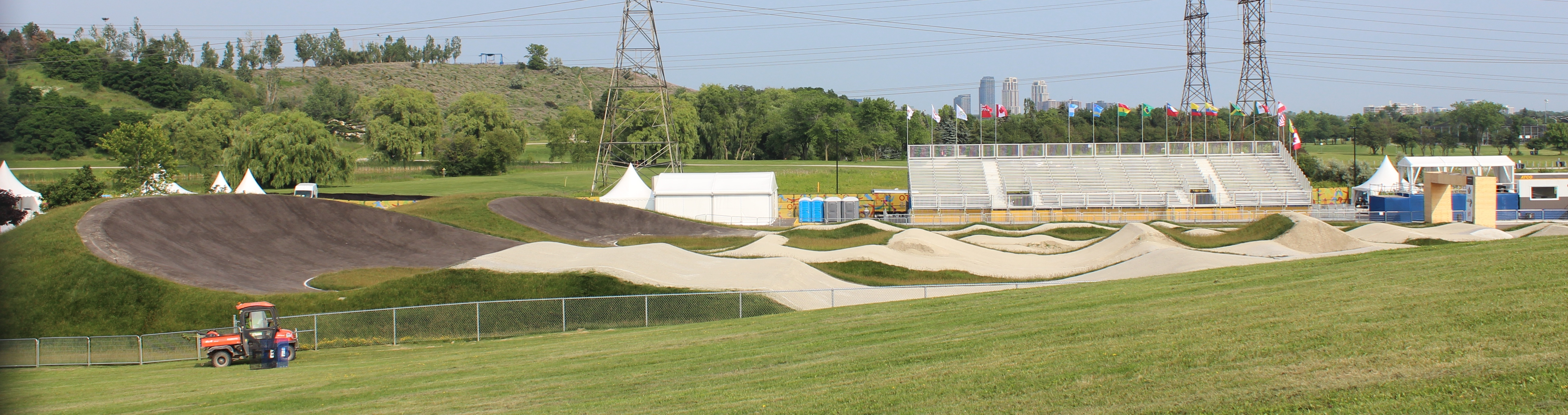
- Centennial Park Pan Am BMX Centre prior to the start of the Toronto 2015 Pan American Games
- Interactive map of Centennial Park Pan Am BMX Centre
- Address: 256 Centennial Park Road; Toronto, Ontario; M9C 5K6
- Coordinates: 43°39′17.7″N 79°35′42.7″W
- Owner: City of Toronto
- Capacity: 2,000 (temporary)
- Field size: 350-metre, four straightaways, three banked turns

Construction
- Built: 2013–2015
- Opened: 2015

Tenant
- 2015 Pan American Games

The Centennial Park Pan Am BMX Centre is a BMX cycling facility at Centennial Park in the Etobicoke district of Toronto, Ontario, Canada, that hosted BMX Cycling at the 2015 Pan American Games. During the games the venue included temporary seating for 2,000 spectators.

== Description ==
Prior to its development, the site was an empty grass area next Centennial Park's baseball diamonds at the corner of Eglinton Avenue West and Centennial Park Road.

The BMX facility cost CA$4.41 million to build and features a 350-metre (1,150 ft) track in a closed loop design consisting of four straightaways, three banked turns, and multiple jumps. The track includes two start ramps; an 8-metre (26 ft) starting platform for professional and international competitions and a 5-metre (16 ft) platform for youths and beginners.

The facility was originally supposed to be built at Ontario Place but was moved to Centennial Park for unknown reasons. The move faced opposition from city councillor Doug Holyday who said "We want people to come with their families [to Centennial] and be able to sit down and have a picnic. We want to be able to walk around the place without getting hit by a baseball or run over by a bike. And that's the way the place should be."

Upon the completion of the games, the facility was opened for public use. The facility is open from dawn to dusk daily, from May 1 to October 31, and is maintained by the City of Toronto.

== Major competitions hosted ==
Year	Date	Event	Level
2015	June 14	BMX Canada Cup Series Round #2	National – UCI – C1
2015	July 10–11	2015 Pan American Games	International
2016	July 9–10	BMX Canada Cup Series Round #5 & #6	National – UCI – C1
2017	July 8–9	BMX Canada Cup Series Round #3 & #4	National – UCI – C1
2018	July 14–15	BMX Canada Cup Series Round #2 & #3	National – UCI – C1
2019	July 6	Canadian BMX Championships	National – UCI – C1
2019	July 7	BMX Canada Cup Series Round #1	National – UCI – C1

== See also ==
- Venues of the 2015 Pan American and Parapan American Games
