= Raphaël Gagné =

Canadian bicycle racer

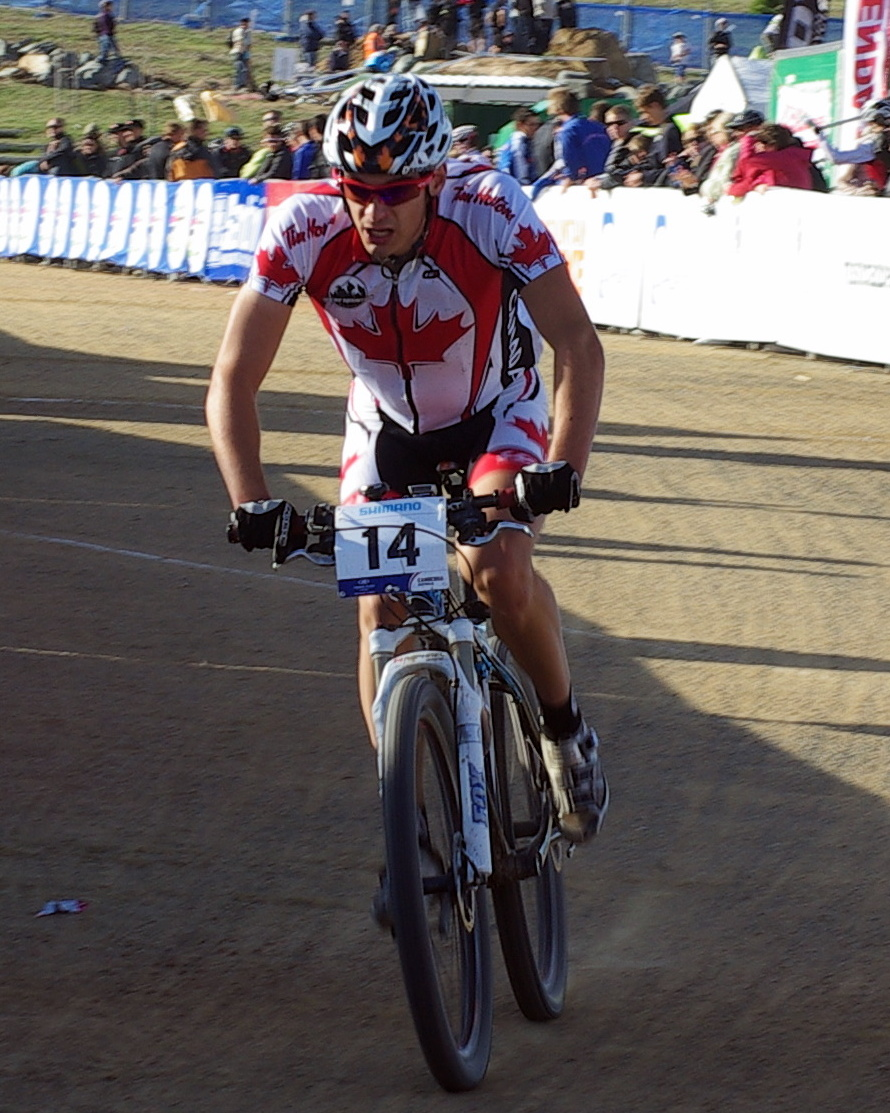

Personal information
- Born: 16 July 1987 (age 38) Quebec City, Canada

Sport
- Sport: Mountain biking
Medal record
Representing Canada
Pan American Games
Gold medal – first place	2015 Toronto	Cross-country
World Championships
Gold medal – first place	2004 Les Gets	Team cross-country
Silver medal – second place	2009 Canberra	Team cross-country

Raphaël Gagné (born July 16, 1987) is a Canadian cross-country mountain biker.

== Career ==
Born in Quebec City, Quebec, Gagné won a gold medal at the 2015 Pan American Games. He also finished 6th at UCI-Mtb world cup XCO in Windham. He finished 7th at the 2014 Commonwealth Games. In 2016, he was named to Canada's Olympic team.

=== 2018 ===
Gagné joins European based UCI World cup team, Silverback OMX Pro Team with the goal of working towards 2020 Olympic Games.
