= Hardwood Ski and Bike =

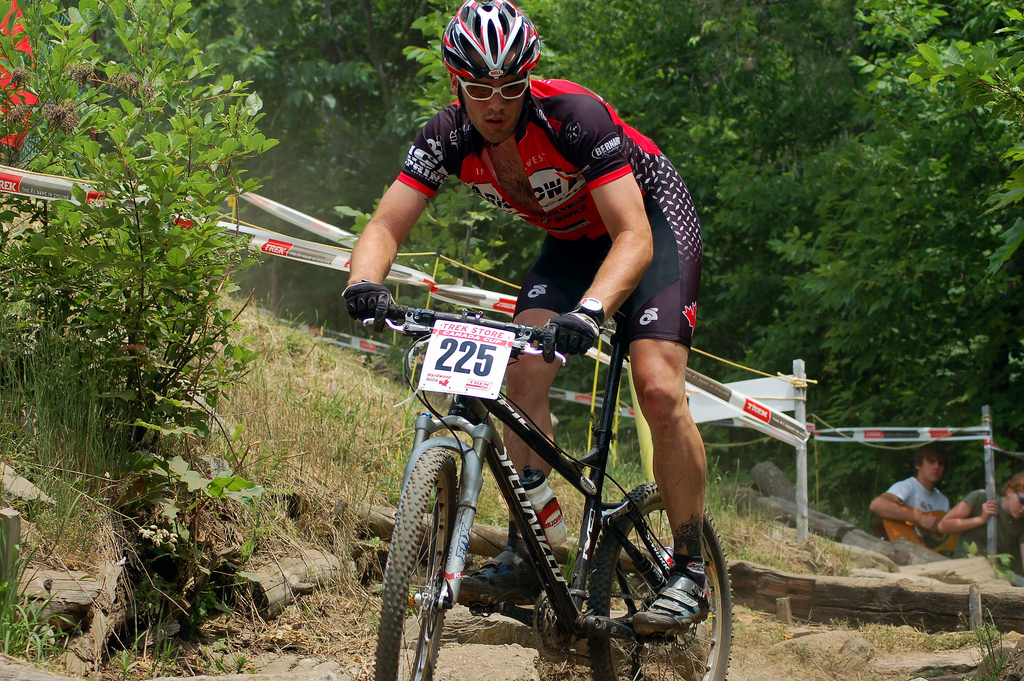
- Interactive map of Hardwood Ski and Bike
- Location: 402 Old Barrie Road West, Oro-Medonte, Ontario, Canada
- Coordinates: 44°31′03.5″N 79°35′30.6″W
- Capacity: 5,000

Tenant
- 2015 Pan American Games

Hardwood Ski and Bike is located in Oro-Medonte Township in Ontario’s Lake Country region about one hour north of Toronto, Ontario. The facility is a family oriented cross country skiing, snowshoeing, mountain biking and outdoor recreation area.

== Mountain Biking ==
Hardwood Ski and Bike was the site of the mountain biking events for the 2015 Pan American Games which took place from July 10 to July 26, 2015. For the games, there was a completely new Pan Am race trail. Hardwood Ski and Bike was also the proposed venue for mountain biking for Toronto's failed 2008 Olympics bid. Due to naming rights the area was known as Hardwood Mountain Bike Park for the duration of the games.

== Winter Sports ==
Winter cross country trails range from 3.3 km to 19 km in length with loops that total 74 kilometres and are for every level of ability, from beginner to elite racer. In addition, there are approximately 18 kilometres of marked snowshoe trails. The terrain ranges from gently rolling to challenging and the facilities provide groomed trails for both classic and skate techniques. The facilities are located in a consistent and abundant snow-belt area in Central Ontario.

== Programs and Racing ==
The venue hosts numerous mountain bike and cross country ski races over the year. Each spring the Canada Cup brings out the best riders in Canada, while the Hardwood Wednesday Night Race Series attracts the families from the beginning of May to the end of August.

== Facilities ==
- Beach volleyball court
- Orienteering and low ropes
- Disc golf
- Bike wash
- Complete ski and bike shop
- Rental shop
- Repairs and accessories for both recreational, performance skiers and mountain bike riders
- Cafe
- Parking

== See also ==
- Venues of the 2015 Pan American and Parapan American Games
