= UCI Mountain Bike & Trials World Championships – Men's downhill =

Cycling competition

The men's downhill is an event at the annual UCI Mountain Bike & Trails World Championships. It has been held since the inaugural championships in 1990.

== Medalists ==
| Championships | Gold | Silver | Bronze |
|---|---|---|---|
| 1990 (United States) Durango | Greg Herbold; United States; Bike: Koga-Miyata | Mike Kloser; United States; Bike: — | Paul Thomasberg; United States; Bike: — |
| 1991 (Italy) Ciocco | Albert Iten; Switzerland; Bike: Cilo / ATZ | John Tomac; United States; Bike: Raleigh John Tomac Signature | Glen Adams; United States; Bike: — |
| 1992 (Canada) Bromont | Dave Cullinan; United States; Bike: Iron Horse FS Works | Jimmy Deaton; United States; Bike: Yeti ARC-AS | Christian Taillefer; France; Bike: — |
| 1993 (France) Métabief | Mike King; United States; Bike: Balance full-suspension | Paolo Caramellino; Italy; Bike: Turro Meteor Competition | Myles Rockwell; United States; Bike: Yeti ARC-AS |
| 1994 (United States) Vail | François Gachet; France; Bike: Sunn Radical | Tommy Johansson; Sweden; Bike: — | Corrado Hérin; Italy; Bike: — |
| 1995 (Germany) Kirchzarten | Nicolas Vouilloz; France; Bike: GT LTS Team | François Gachet; France; Bike: Sunn Radical | Mike King; United States; Bike: GT LTS |
| 1996 (Australia) Cairns | Nicolas Vouilloz; France; Bike: GT LTS-1 | Shaun Palmer; United States; Bike: Intense M1 | Bas de Bever; Netherlands; Bike: Batavus |
| 1997 (Switzerland) Château-d'Œx | Nicolas Vouilloz; France; Bike: Sunn Radical | John Tomac; United States; Bike: Giant / Intense M1 | Cédric Gracia; France; Bike: Sunn Radical |
| 1998 (Canada) Mont-Sainte-Anne | Nicolas Vouilloz; France; Bike: Sunn Radical Plus | Gerwin Peters; Netherlands; Bike: Be-One | Mickaël Pascal; France; Bike: Sunn Radical Plus |
| 1999 (Sweden) Åre | Nicolas Vouilloz; France; Bike: Sunn Radical Plus | Mickaël Pascal; France; Bike: Sunn Radical Plus | Eric Carter; United States; Bike: GT Lobo DH |
| 2000 (Spain) Sierra Nevada | Myles Rockwell; United States; Bike: Giant ATX-One DH | Steve Peat; Great Britain; Bike: GT DHi | Mickaël Pascal; France; Bike: Be-One DH |
| 2001 (United States) Vail | Nicolas Vouilloz; France; Bike: V-Process NV01 | Steve Peat; Great Britain; Bike: GT DHi | Greg Minnaar; South Africa; Bike: Orange 222 |
| 2002 (Austria) Kaprun | Nicolas Vouilloz; France; Bike: V-Process NV02 | Steve Peat; Great Britain; Bike: Orange 222 | Chris Kovarik; Australia; Bike: Intense M1 |
| 2003 (Switzerland) Lugano | Greg Minnaar; South Africa; Bike: Haro DHR | Mickaël Pascal; France; Bike: MSC | Fabien Barel; France; Bike: Kona Stab |
| 2004 (France) Les Gets | Fabien Barel; France; Bike: Kona Stab | Greg Minnaar; South Africa; Bike: Honda RN-01 G-Cross | Sam Hill; Australia; Bike: Iron Horse SGS DH |
| 2005 (Italy) Livigno | Fabien Barel; France; Bike: Kona Stab | Sam Hill; Australia; Bike: Iron Horse Sunday | Greg Minnaar; South Africa; Bike: Honda RN-01 G-Cross |
| 2006 (New Zealand) Rotorua | Sam Hill; Australia; Bike: Iron Horse Sunday Factory | Greg Minnaar; South Africa; Bike: Honda RN-01 G-Cross | Nathan Rennie; Australia; Bike: Santa Cruz V10 |
| 2007 (United Kingdom) Fort William | Sam Hill; Australia; Bike: Iron Horse Sunday Factory | Fabien Barel; France; Bike: Kona Stab Supreme | Gee Atherton; Great Britain; Bike: Commencal Supreme DH |
| 2008 (Italy) Val di Sole | Gee Atherton; Great Britain; Bike: Commencal Supreme DH | Steve Peat; Great Britain; Bike: Santa Cruz V10 | Sam Hill; Australia; Bike: Iron Horse Sunday |
| 2009 (Australia) Canberra | Steve Peat; Great Britain; Bike: Santa Cruz V10 | Greg Minnaar; South Africa; Bike: Santa Cruz V10 | Mick Hannah; Australia; Bike: GT Fury |
| 2010 (Canada) Mont-Sainte-Anne | Sam Hill; Australia; Bike: Specialized Demo | Steve Smith; Canada; Bike: Devinci Wilson | Greg Minnaar; South Africa; Bike: Santa Cruz V10 |
| 2011 (Switzerland) Champéry | Danny Hart; Great Britain; Bike: Giant Glory | Damien Spagnolo; France; Bike: Mondraker Summum | Samuel Blenkinsop; New Zealand; Bike: Lapierre DH |
| 2012 (Austria) Leogang/Saalfelden | Greg Minnaar; South Africa; Bike: Santa Cruz V10 Carbon | Gee Atherton; Great Britain; Bike: GT Fury | Steve Smith; Canada; Bike: Devinci Wilson Carbon |
| 2013 (South Africa) Pietermaritzburg | Greg Minnaar; South Africa; Bike: Santa Cruz V10 Carbon | Mick Hannah; Australia; Bike: Polygon DH prototype | Jared Graves; Australia; Bike: Yeti SB66 Carbon |
| 2014 (Norway) Hafjell/Lillehammer | Gee Atherton; Great Britain; Bike: GT Fury | Josh Bryceland; Great Britain; Bike: Santa Cruz V10 | Troy Brosnan; Australia; Bike: Specialized Demo |
| 2015 (Andorra) Vallnord | Loïc Bruni; France; Bike: Lapierre DH | Greg Minnaar; South Africa; Bike: Santa Cruz V10 | Josh Bryceland; Great Britain; Bike: Santa Cruz V10 |
| 2016 (Italy) Val di Sole | Danny Hart; Great Britain; Bike: Mondraker Summum | Laurie Greenland; Great Britain; Bike: Mondraker Summum | Florent Payet; France; Bike: Mondraker Summum |
| 2017 (Australia) Cairns | Loïc Bruni; France; Bike: Specialized Demo | Mick Hannah; Australia; Bike: Polygon DH | Aaron Gwin; United States; Bike: YT Tues |
| 2018 (Switzerland) Lenzerheide | Loïc Bruni; France; Bike: Specialized S-Works Demo 8 | Martin Maes; Belgium; Bike: GT Fury | Danny Hart; Great Britain; Bike: Mondraker Summum Carbon |
| 2019 (Canada) Mont-Sainte-Anne | Loïc Bruni; France; Bike: Specialized Demo 29 | Troy Brosnan; Australia; Bike: Specialized Demo 29 | Amaury Pierron; France; Bike: Commencal Supreme DH 29 |
| 2020 (Austria) Leogang | Reece Wilson; Great Britain; Bike: Trek Session | David Trummer; Austria; Bike: YT Tues | Rémi Thirion; France; Bike: Commencal Supreme DH |
| 2021 (Italy) Val di Sole | Greg Minnaar; South Africa; Bike: Santa Cruz V10 | Benoît Coulanges; France; Bike: Commencal Supreme DH | Troy Brosnan; Australia; Bike: Canyon Sender CFR |
| 2022 (France) Les Gets | Loïc Bruni; France; Bike: Specialized Demo | Amaury Pierron; France; Bike: Commencal Supreme V5 | Loris Vergier; France; Bike: Trek Session |
| 2023 (United Kingdom) Fort William | Charlie Hatton; Great Britain; Bike: Atherton AM.200 | Andreas Kolb; Austria; Bike: Atherton AM.200 | Laurie Greenland; Great Britain; Bike: Santa Cruz V10 |
| 2024 (Andorra) Pal–Arinsal | Loris Vergier; France; Bike: Trek Session | Benoît Coulanges; France; Bike: Commencal Supreme DH V5 | Finn Iles; Canada; Bike: Specialized Demo |
| 2025 (Switzerland) Valais | Jackson Goldstone; Canada; Bike: Santa Cruz V10 | Henri Kiefer; Germany; Bike: Canyon Sender CFR | Ronan Dunne; Ireland; Bike: Mondraker Summum prototype |

== Medal table ==
| Rank | Nation | Gold | Silver | Bronze | Total |
|---|---|---|---|---|---|
| 1 | France | 16 | 8 | 9 | 33 |
| 2 | Great Britain | 7 | 7 | 4 | 18 |
| 3 | United States | 4 | 5 | 6 | 15 |
| 4 | South Africa | 4 | 4 | 3 | 11 |
| 5 | Australia | 3 | 4 | 8 | 15 |
| 6 | Canada | 1 | 1 | 2 | 4 |
| 7 | Switzerland | 1 | 0 | 0 | 1 |
| 8 | Austria | 0 | 2 | 0 | 2 |
| 9 | Italy | 0 | 1 | 1 | 2 |
| 9 | Netherlands | 0 | 1 | 1 | 2 |
| 11 | Belgium | 0 | 1 | 0 | 1 |
| 11 | Germany | 0 | 1 | 0 | 1 |
| 11 | Sweden | 0 | 1 | 0 | 1 |
| 14 | Ireland | 0 | 0 | 1 | 1 |
| 14 | New Zealand | 0 | 0 | 1 | 1 |
| Totals (15 entries) | | 36 | 36 | 36 | 108 |

=== Medal table by rider ===
| Rank | Rider | Gold | Silver | Bronze | Total |
|---|---|---|---|---|---|
| 1 | (France) Nicolas Vouilloz | 7 | 0 | 0 | 7 |
| 2 | (France) Loïc Bruni | 5 | 0 | 0 | 5 |
| 3 | (South Africa) Greg Minnaar | 4 | 4 | 3 | 11 |
| 4 | (Australia) Sam Hill | 3 | 1 | 2 | 6 |
| 5 | (United Kingdom) Gee Atherton | 2 | 1 | 1 | 4 |
| 5 | (France) Fabien Barel | 2 | 1 | 1 | 4 |
| 7 | (United Kingdom) Danny Hart | 2 | 0 | 1 | 3 |
| 8 | (United Kingdom) Steve Peat | 1 | 4 | 0 | 5 |
| 9 | (France) François Gachet | 1 | 1 | 0 | 2 |
| 10 | (United States) Mike King | 1 | 0 | 1 | 2 |
| 10 | (United States) Myles Rockwell | 1 | 0 | 1 | 2 |
| 10 | (France) Loris Vergier | 1 | 0 | 1 | 2 |
| 13 | (United States) Dave Cullinan | 1 | 0 | 0 | 1 |
| 13 | (United States) Greg Herbold | 1 | 0 | 0 | 1 |
| 13 | (Switzerland) Albert Iten | 1 | 0 | 0 | 1 |
| 13 | (United Kingdom) Reece Wilson | 1 | 0 | 0 | 1 |
| 13 | (United Kingdom) Charlie Hatton | 1 | 0 | 0 | 1 |
| 13 | (Canada) Jackson Goldstone | 1 | 0 | 0 | 1 |
| 19 | (France) Mickaël Pascal | 0 | 2 | 2 | 4 |
| 20 | (Australia) Mick Hannah | 0 | 2 | 1 | 3 |
| 21 | (United States) John Tomac | 0 | 2 | 0 | 2 |
| 21 | (France) Benoît Coulanges | 0 | 2 | 0 | 2 |
| Total | | 35 | 18 | 13 | 62 |
