= UCI Mountain Bike & Trials World Championships – Women's cross-country =

The women's cross-country is an event at the annual UCI Mountain Bike & Trials World Championships. It has been held since the inaugural championships in 1990. As of 2023, Pauline Ferrand-Prévot of France is the most successful rider with five gold medals and one bronze medal won since 2015.

== Medalists ==
Championships	Gold	Silver	Bronze
1990 Durango	Juli Furtado; United States	Sara Ballantyne; United States	Ruthie Matthes; United States
1991 Ciocco	Ruthie Matthes; United States	Eva Orvošová; Slovakia	Silvia Fürst; Switzerland
1992 Bromont	Silvia Fürst; Switzerland	Alison Sydor; Canada	Ruthie Matthes; United States
1993 Métabief	Paola Pezzo; Italy	Jeannie Longo; France	Ruthie Matthes; United States
1994 Vail	Alison Sydor; Canada	Susan DeMattei; United States	Sara Ballantyne; United States
1995 Kirchzarten	Alison Sydor; Canada	Silvia Fürst; Switzerland	Chantal Daucourt; Switzerland
1996 Cairns	Alison Sydor; Canada	Ruthie Matthes; United States	Maria Paola Turcutto; Italy
1997 Château-d'Œx	Paola Pezzo; Italy	Nadia De Negri; Italy	Margarita Fullana; Spain
1998 Mont Sainte-Anne	Laurence Leboucher; France	Gunn-Rita Dahle Flesjå; Norway	Alison Sydor; Canada
1999 Åre	Margarita Fullana; Spain	Alison Sydor; Canada	Paola Pezzo; Italy
2000 Sierra Nevada	Margarita Fullana; Spain	Alison Sydor; Canada	Paola Pezzo; Italy
2001 Vail	Alison Dunlap; United States	Alison Sydor; Canada	Sabine Spitz; Germany
2002 Kaprun	Gunn-Rita Dahle Flesjå; Norway	Anna Szafraniec; Poland	Sabine Spitz; Germany
2003 Lugano	Sabine Spitz; Germany	Alison Sydor; Canada	Irina Kalentieva; Russia
2004 Les Gets	Gunn-Rita Dahle Flesjå; Norway	Maja Włoszczowska; Poland	Alison Sydor; Canada
2005 Livigno	Gunn-Rita Dahle Flesjå; Norway	Maja Włoszczowska; Poland	Petra Henzi; Switzerland
2006 Rotorua	Gunn-Rita Dahle Flesjå; Norway	Irina Kalentieva; Russia	Marie-Hélène Prémont; Canada
2007 Fort William	Irina Kalentieva; Russia	Sabine Spitz; Germany	Jingjing Wang; China
2008 Val di Sole	Margarita Fullana; Spain	Sabine Spitz; Germany	Irina Kalentieva; Russia
2009 Canberra	Irina Kalentieva; Russia	Lene Byberg; Norway	Willow Koerber; United States
2010 Mont-Sainte-Anne	Maja Włoszczowska; Poland	Irina Kalentieva; Russia	Willow Koerber; United States
2011 Champery	Catharine Pendrel; Canada	Maja Włoszczowska; Poland	Eva Lechner; Italy
2012 Leogang-Saalfelden	Julie Bresset; France	Gunn-Rita Dahle Flesjå; Norway	Georgia Gould; United States
2013 Pietermaritzburg-Leogang	Julie Bresset; France	Maja Włoszczowska; Poland	Esther Süss; Switzerland
2014 Lillehammer	Catharine Pendrel; Canada	Irina Kalentieva; Russia	Lea Davison; United States
2015 Vallnord	Pauline Ferrand-Prévot; France	Irina Kalentieva; Russia	Yana Belomoyna; Ukraine
2016 Nové Město	Annika Langvad; Denmark	Lea Davison; United States	Emily Batty; Canada
2017 Cairns	Jolanda Neff; Switzerland	Annie Last; Great Britain	Pauline Ferrand-Prévot; France
2018 Lenzerheide	Kate Courtney; United States	Annika Langvad; Denmark	Emily Batty; Canada
2019 Mont-Sainte-Anne	Pauline Ferrand-Prévot; France	Jolanda Neff; Switzerland	Rebecca McConnell; Australia
2020 Leogang	Pauline Ferrand-Prévot; France	Eva Lechner; Italy	Rebecca McConnell; Australia
2021 Val di Sole	Evie Richards; Great Britain	Anne Terpstra; Netherlands	Sina Frei; Switzerland
2022 Les Gets	Pauline Ferrand-Prévot; France	Jolanda Neff; Switzerland	Haley Batten; United States
2023 Glasgow	Pauline Ferrand-Prévot; France	Loana Lecomte; France	Puck Pieterse; Netherlands
2024 Pal–Arinsal	Puck Pieterse; Netherlands	Anne Terpstra; Netherlands	Martina Berta; Italy
2025 Valais	Jenny Rissveds; Sweden	Sammie Maxwell; New Zealand	Alessandra Keller; Switzerland

== Medal table ==
Rank	Nation	Gold	Silver	Bronze	Total
1	France	8	2	1	11
2	Canada	5	5	5	15
3	United States	4	4	9	17
4	Norway	4	3	0	7
5	Spain	3	0	1	4
6	Russia	2	4	2	8
7	Switzerland	2	3	6	11
8	Italy	2	2	5	9
9	Poland	1	5	0	6
10	Germany	1	2	2	5
11	Netherlands	1	2	1	4
12	Denmark	1	1	0	2
12	Great Britain	1	1	0	2
14	Sweden	1	0	0	1
15	New Zealand	0	1	0	1
15	Slovakia	0	1	0	1
17	Australia	0	0	2	2
18	China	0	0	1	1
18	Ukraine	0	0	1	1
Totals (19 entries)		36	36	36	108

=== Medal table by rider ===
Rank	Rider	Gold	Silver	Bronze	Total
1	Pauline Ferrand-Prévot France	5	0	1	6
2	Gunn-Rita Dahle Norway	4	2	0	6
3	Alison Sydor Canada	3	5	2	10
4	Margarita Fullana Spain	3	0	1	4
5	Irina Kalentieva Russia	2	4	2	8
6	Paola Pezzo Italy	2	0	2	4
7	Catharine Pendrel Canada	2	0	0	2
7	Julie Bresset France	2	0	0	2
9	Maja Włoszczowska Poland	1	4	0	5
10	Sabine Spitz Germany	1	2	2	5
11	Jolanda Neff Switzerland	1	2	0	3
12	Ruthie Matthes United States	1	1	3	5
13	Silvia Furst Switzerland	1	1	1	3
14	Annika Langvad Denmark	1	1	0	2
15	Puck Pieterse Netherlands	1	0	1	2
16	Laurence Leboucher France	1	0	0	1
16	Evie Richards Great Britain	1	0	0	1
16	Kate Courtney United States	1	0	0	1
16	Jenny Rissveds Sweden	1	0	0	1
16	Juli Furtado United States	1	0	0	1
16	Alison Dunlap United States	1	0	0	1
22	Anne Terpstra Netherlands	0	2	0	2
23	Eva Lechner Italy	0	1	1	2
23	Sara Ballantyne United States	0	1	1	2
23	Lea Davison United States	0	1	1	2
26	Jeannie Longo France	0	1	0	1
26	Loana Lecomte France	0	1	0	1
26	Annie Last Great Britain	0	1	0	1
26	Nadia De Negri Italy	0	1	0	1
26	Sammie Maxwell New Zealand	0	1	0	1
26	Lene Byberg Norway	0	1	0	1
26	Anna Szafraniec Poland	0	1	0	1
26	Eva Orvošová Slovakia	0	1	0	1
26	Susan DeMattei United States	0	1	0	1
35	Emily Batty Canada	0	0	2	2
35	Rebecca McConnell Australia	0	0	2	2
35	Willow Koerber United States	0	0	2	2
38	Marie-Hélène Prémont Canada	0	0	1	1
38	Jingjing Wang China	0	0	1	1
38	Georgia Gould United States	0	0	1	1
38	Maria Paola Turcutto Italy	0	0	1	1
38	Martina Berta Italy	0	0	1	1
38	Chantal Daucourt Switzerland	0	0	1	1
38	Esther Süss Switzerland	0	0	1	1
38	Petra Henzi Switzerland	0	0	1	1
38	Sina Frei Switzerland	0	0	1	1
38	Alessandra Keller Switzerland	0	0	1	1
38	Yana Belomoyna Ukraine	0	0	1	1
38	Haley Batten United States	0	0	1	1
Totals (49 entries)		36	36	36	108
