= Sam Hill (cyclist) =

Australian professional mountain biker

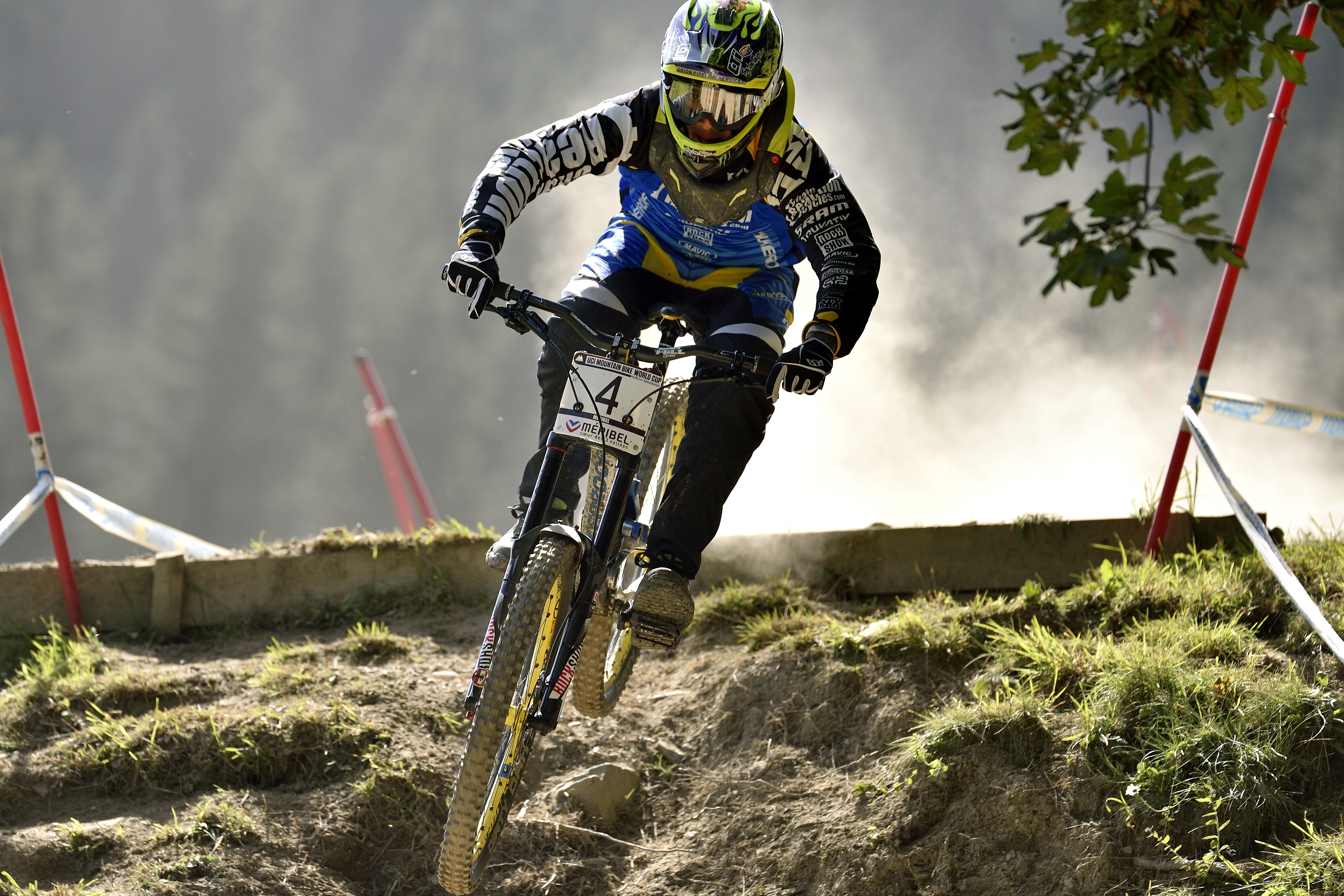
- Sam Hill winning the last round of the MTB UCI World Cup in Méribel (2014)

Personal information
- Full name: Samuel Hill
- Born: 21 July 1985 (age 41) Viveash, Australia

Cycling career
- Sport: Cycling
- Current team: Chain Reaction Cycles
- Discipline: Mountain Bike
- Role: Rider
- Rider type: Enduro and down hill

Major wins
- Enduro World Series Champion (2017, 2018, 2019); UCI Downhill World Champion (2006, 2007, 2010); UCI Downhill World Cup Champion (2007, 2009); UCI Junior Downhill World Champion (2002, 2003)
Medal record
Representing Australia
Men's mountain bike racing
World Championships
Gold medal – first place	2002 Kaprun	Junior downhill
Gold medal – first place	2003 Lugano	Junior downhill
Gold medal – first place	2006 Rotorua	Downhill
Gold medal – first place	2007 Fort William	Downhill
Gold medal – first place	2010 Mont-Saint-Anne	Downhill
Silver medal – second place	2005 Livigno	Downhill
Bronze medal – third place	2001 Vail	Junior downhill
Bronze medal – third place	2004 Les Gets	Downhill
Bronze medal – third place	2008 Val di Sole	Downhill

Sam Hill (born 21 July 1985 in Viveash, Western Australia), is an Australian professional enduro mountain biker and former professional downhill racer. He was two-time consecutive UCI World Downhill Champion during years 2006–2007 for Iron Horse racing team. He won the 2010 world championships in Mont Saint Anne, riding for the Monster Energy Specialized team on a Specialized Demo 8 II. He also won the 2007 and 2009 UCI Elite Men's Downhill World Cup (Overall). In December 2012 it was announced that Hill had signed for the Chain Reaction Cycles/Nukeproof team. As of 2016, Hill has switched to racing enduro and won the 2017 Enduro World Series overall title. In the same year he raced the Downhill World Championships in Cairns, Australia on his enduro bike where he finished sixth.

== Early riding career ==
In 2001, aged 16 years old, Sam Hill first appeared on the international mountain bike racing scene, attending his first overseas race travelling Canada and the US. He came third (3rd) at the Vail World Championships in the Under 19 (Junior) Downhill event.

In 2002 he won the Under 19 Australian Championships. The same year he was crowned Junior Downhill World Champion at the World Championships in Kaprun, Austria.

In 2003, aged just 18, Hill won both the Australian and Oceania Downhill Championships in the Elite category. He then went on to successfully defend his Junior World Champion title in Lugano, Switzerland.

He starred in the 2010 mountain bike movie Follow Me.

== Riding style ==
Sam Hill is known for his skill in riding steep, technical courses, rather than flatter courses that require more pedaling. He has regularly won on Schladming, one of the steepest, most technical tracks on the World Cup Circuit. His famous run in Champery (2007) also testifies to his skill on technical courses. Sam achieved a 2nd-place finish in Rd. 3 of the 2016 Enduro World Series in Ireland, on a course that required significant pedaling strength and technical ability.

Sam Hill is notable for being one of the only professional enduro mountain bikers to utilize flat pedals.

== Notable races ==
2003 Downhill World Championships, Lugano, Switzerland At the time Sam was only 18 years of age and still in the junior class (Under 19). He went into this race as the favourite to win the junior title. The track was also perfect for Sam's style, steep and technical. Eric Carter, the mtb legend saw Sam riding for the first time at this race and said of him, "He went through a section so fast, and it was so rocky and muddy and loose, that I couldn't understand... how he made his bike do what it did". During his race run he had a crash although he still managed to walk away with the junior title, but somewhat surprisingly he came third out of all the times on the day. If he had stayed on he would have surely beaten Greg Minaar for the fastest time and the Senior Men's World Title at the age of 18.

2007 World Cup round 2, Champéry, Switzerland After placing fifth in round one at Vigo, Spain, all eyes were glued on Sam Hill in round two. The extremely steep and technical track seemed almost tailor-made for the young Australian. All seemed to be going well for Hill when he qualified in first place early on race day, besting the second place qualifier by over 14 seconds! Hill was looking confident for Finals. However, with approximately 30 riders left to set off, on arguably the most dangerous course the world cup series has seen in many years, the skies opened up. It had rained every day at this time the whole weekend, but not this hard. Riders who qualified in the top ten were seen finishing in the late forties, early fifties. When last man to down the track, Hill, set off, no one could believe their eyes. The World Champion at the time was ripping down the track faster than top riders were riding it in the bone dry, perfect conditions. Hill's split time was faster than second place (Steve Peat, who raced in dry conditions), but a fall later in his run meant the Aussie ended up in a very respectable third position, just 1.63sec off first place rider Matti Lehikoinen, who also completed his final run in the dry. Hill's run will go down in history as one of the greatest runs in the wet, if not one of the greatest ever. Dan Atherton later quoted "He showed us all that it ain't over, 'till its truly over". Further, eventual winner Matti Lehikoinen stated after the race "I played the tactics (referring to a 20-second pause in his practice run, ensuring a lower qualifying position to avoid any unfavourable weather changes), but Sam is the winner of the day. No questions". Steve Peat said "Sam is the King – give him the crown." Despite his remarkable and certainly unmatched talent for riding in unfavorable conditions, Sam admits that he rarely rides in the rain. In an interview with Steve Jones of Dirt Magazine featured in the film 'Earthed 5: The Law of Fives', when asked if it rained that hard in Australia and if he was used to riding in such conditions Sam replied "I don't even see a raindrop when I'm in Australia". Jones then asked "So you never ride in the rain?" Hill's reply was simply, "My bike gets muddy".

2008 Downhill World Championships, Val di Sole, Italy Sam Hill came into this race the reigning world champion. With four riders left on the hill Sam Hill started his final run. At the split he was five seconds up and no one could believe how fast he was going, even the commentator, Rob Warner, a former world level racer. Rob Warner yelled "Look how fast he's going!", "It looks like the film has been speeded up!". Sam was estimated 10 seconds up when he hit the final left hand turn at the bottom of the track. He pulled one of his classic drift turns around the corner but as he straightened up on exit his bike suddenly washed out from under him. He got straight back on his bike but it had cost him his lead and he finished 0.5 of a second behind eventual second place Steve Peat.

2010 Downhill World Championships, Mont-Sainte-Anne, Canada

== Results ==
2001
3rd Place Junior Downhill – Vail, Co, USA Age 16

2002

Junior World Champion Downhill – Kaprun, Austria Age 17

2003

Junior World Champion Downhill – Lugano Switzerland Age 18

2004
3rd Place, UCI Mountain Bike World Championships 2004, Downhill – Les Gets, France
2nd Place, Overall UCI Mountain Bike World Cup 2004, Downhill

3rd Place: Fort William UCI World Cup DH
4th Place: Les 2 Alpes, France UCI World Cup DH
3rd Place: Schladming UCI World Cup DH
2nd Place: Mont Saint Anne UCI World Cup DH
3rd Place: Livigno, Italy UCI World Cup DH

2005
2nd Place, UCI Mountain Bike World Championships 2005, Downhill – Livigno, Italy
2nd Place, Overall UCI Mountain Bike World Cup 2005, Downhill

3rd Place: Vigo, Spain UCI World Cup DH
5th Place: Willigen, Germany UCI World Cup DH
1st Place: Schladming, Austria UCI World Cup DH
1st Place: Pila, Italy UCI World Cup DH
6th Place: Fort William, Scotland UCI World Cup DH

2006

1st place, UCI Mountain Bike World Championships 2006, Downhill – Rotorua, New Zealand

2nd Place, Overall UCI Mountain Bike World Cup 2006, Downhill

6th place: Vigo, Spain UCI World Cup DH
1st Place: Fort William, Scotland UCI World Cup DH
14th Place: Willigen, Germany UCI World Cup DH
3rd Place: Mt Sainte Anne, Canada UCI World Cup DH
5th Place: Balneario Camboriu, Brazil UCI World Cup DH
1st Place: Schladming, Austria UCI World Cup DH (won by 8.17 seconds)

2007

1st place, UCI Mountain Bike World Championships 2007, Downhill – Fort William, Scotland

1st Place Overall UCI Mountain Bike World Cup, Downhill

5th place: Vigo, Spain UCI World Cup DH
3rd Place: Champery, Switzerland UCI World Cup DH
1st Place: Mont Sainte-Anne, Canada UCI World Cup DH
1st Place: Schladming, Austria UCI World Cup DH
1st Place: Maribor, Slovenia UCI World Cup DH

2008
3rd Place, UCI Mountain Bike World Championships 2008, Downhill – Val di Sole, Italy
2nd Place, Overall UCI Mountain Bike World Cup 2008, Downhill

1st Place: Maribor, Slovenia UCI World Cup DH
2nd Place: Vallnord, Andorra UCI World Cup DH
5th Place: Fort William, Great Britain UCI World Cup DH
2nd Place: Mont Sainte-Anne, Canada UCI World Cup DH
1st Place: Bromont, Canada UCI World Cup DH
11th Place: Canberra, Australia Britain UCI World Cup DH
2nd Place: Schladming, Austria UCI World Cup DH

2009 – Specialized/Monster Energy Team

5th Place, UCI Mountain Bike World Championships 2009, Downhill – Canberra, Australia
1st Place Overall, Overall UCI Mountain Bike World Cup 2009, Downhill

4th place: Pietermaritzburg, South Africa UCI World Cup DH
2nd Place: La Bresse, France UCI World Cup DH
31st Place: Vallnord, Andorra UCI World Cup DH
2nd Place: Fort William, Great Britain UCI World Cup DH
2nd Place: Maribor, Slovenia UCI World Cup DH
1st Place: Mt Sainte Anne, Canada UCI World Cup DH
3rd Place: Bromont, Canada UCI World Cup DH
1st Place: Schladming, Austria UCI World Cup DH

2010 – Specialized/Monster Energy Team

1st Place: UCI Mountain Bike World Championships 2010, Downhill – Mont Sainte Anne, Canada

5th place: Maribor, Slovenia UCI World Cup DH

--Ft William – Injured in Practice--

13th Place: Windham, USA UCI World Cup DH

2011 – Specialized/Monster Energy Team

8th Place: Pietermaritzburg, South Africa UCI World Cup DH
9th Place: Fort William, Scotland UCI World Cup DH
5th Place: Leogang, Austria UCI World Cup DH

--Injured in Training – Shoulder Surgery--

7th Place: UCI Mountain Bike World Championships 2011

2012 – Specialized/Monster Energy Team

11th place: Pietermaritzburg, South Africa UCI World Cup DH
7th Place: Val Di Sole, Italy UCI World Cup DH
4th Place: Ft William, Scotland UCI World Cup DH
5th Place: Mont St Anne, Canada UCI World Cup DH
7th Place: Windham, USA UCI World Cup DH
27th Place: Val D'Isere, France UCI World Cup DH
7th Place: Hafjell, Norway UCI World Cup DH

2013 – Chain Reaction/Nukeproof Team

6th Place: Fort William, GBR UCI World Cup DH
3rd Place: Mont Sainte Anne, Canada UCI World Cup DH
3rd Place: Vallnord, Andorra UCI World Cup DH
3rd Place: Australian Mountain Bike Championships, AUS/CN
15th Place: Hafjell, Norway UCI World Cup DH
1st Place: Thredbo, AUS Subaru Gravity Cup, Australian National Series DH
1st Place: Mt Buller, AUS Subaru Gravity Cup, Australian National Series DH
56th Place: Val Di Sol, ITALY UCI World Cup DH (5th in qualifications, crashed in final)
5th Place: Halo BDS#1 Combe Sydenham, DH

2014 – Chain Reaction/Nukeproof Team

2nd Place: Fort William, Scotland UCI World Cup DH
1st Place: Mont St. Anne, Canada UCI World Cup DH
1st Place: Meribel, France UCI World Cup DH
4th Place: Overall UCI World Cup DH

2015 – Chain Reaction Cycles/PayPal Team

9th Place: Enduro World Series Rotorua New Zealand

2016 – Chain Reaction Cycles/PayPal Team

2nd Place: Enduro World Series Wicklow Ireland
1st Place: Enduro World Series Valberg-Guillaumes France

2017 – Chain Reaction Cycles/PayPal Team
1st Place Overall, Enduro World Series

1st Place: Enduro World Series Aspen Snowmass USA
2nd Place: Enduro World Series Whistler Canada

2018 – Chain Reaction Cycles/PayPal Team

1st Place : Enduro World Series Lo Barrnechea, Chile
1st Place : Enduro World Series Manizales, Colombia
6th Place: Enduro World Series Montagnes du Caroux, France
1st Place : Enduro World Series Petzen-Jamnica, Austria-Slovenia
1st Place : Enduro World Series La Thuile, Italy
2nd Place: Enduro World Series Whistler, Canada
1st Overall Enduro World Series Champion

2019 – Chain Reaction Cycles/Mavic Team

12th Place : Enduro World Series Rotorua, New Zealand
8th Place : Enduro World Series Tasmania, Australia
5th Place : Enduro World Series Madeira, Portugal
2nd Place : Enduro World Series Val Di Fassa, Italy
12th Place : Enduro World Series Les Orres Coupe du Monde, France
2nd Place : Enduro World Series Canadian Open Enduro, Canada
2nd Place : Enduro World Series Northstar California, United States
2nd Place : Enduro World Series Alpine Mountain Bike Festival Zermatt, Switzerland
1st Place Overall Enduro World Series Champion
