= 1991 UCI Mountain Bike World Championships =

International sports competition

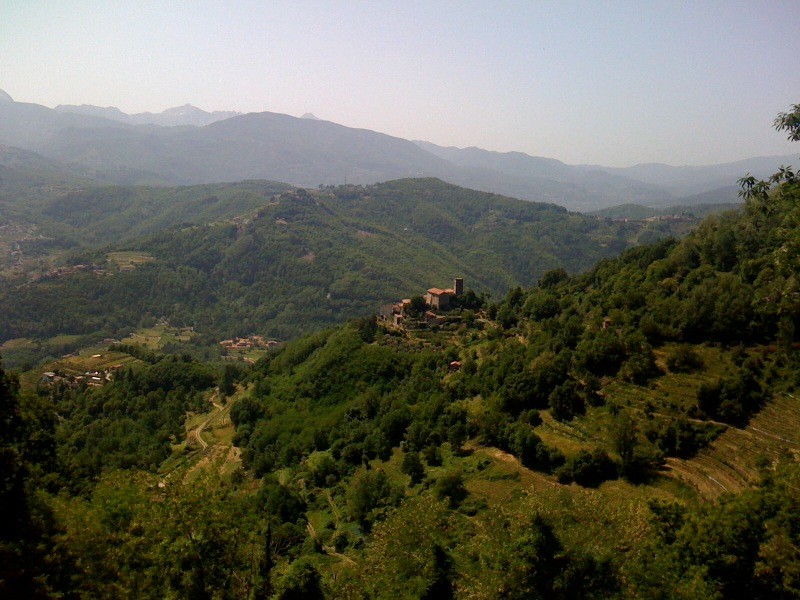
- Venue: Barga, Italy
- Date: 15–16 September 1991

The 1991 UCI Mountain Bike World Championships were held in Barga, Italy from 15 to 16 September 1991.

== Medal summary ==
=== Men's events ===
Event	Gold	Silver	Bronze
Cross-country	John Tomac (USA)	Thomas Frischknecht (SUI)	Ned Overend (USA)
Downhill	Albert Iten (SUI)	John Tomac (USA)	Glen Adams (USA)
Junior downhill	Bruno Zanchi (ITA)	Tomas Misser (ESP)	Vernet de Ceuster (BEL)

=== Women's events ===
Event	Gold	Silver	Bronze
Cross-country	Ruthie Matthes (USA)	Eva Orvošová (SVK)	Silvia Fürst (SUI)
Downhill	Giovanna Bonazzi (ITA)	Nathalie Fiat (FRA)	Cindy Devine (CAN)
Junior downhill	Rita Burgi (SUI)	Melanie Eberle (GER)	Stéphanie Éthoin (FRA)

=== Medal table ===
Rank	Nation	Gold	Silver	Bronze	Total
1	United States (USA)	2	1	2	5
2	Switzerland (SUI)	2	1	1	4
3	Italy (ITA)	2	0	0	2
4	France (FRA)	0	1	1	2
5	Germany (GER)	0	1	0	1
5	Slovakia (SVK)	0	1	0	1
5	Spain (ESP)	0	1	0	1
8	Belgium (BEL)	0	0	1	1
8	Canada (CAN)	0	0	1	1
Totals (9 entries)		6	6	6	18
