= Loïc Bruni =

French cyclist (born 1994)

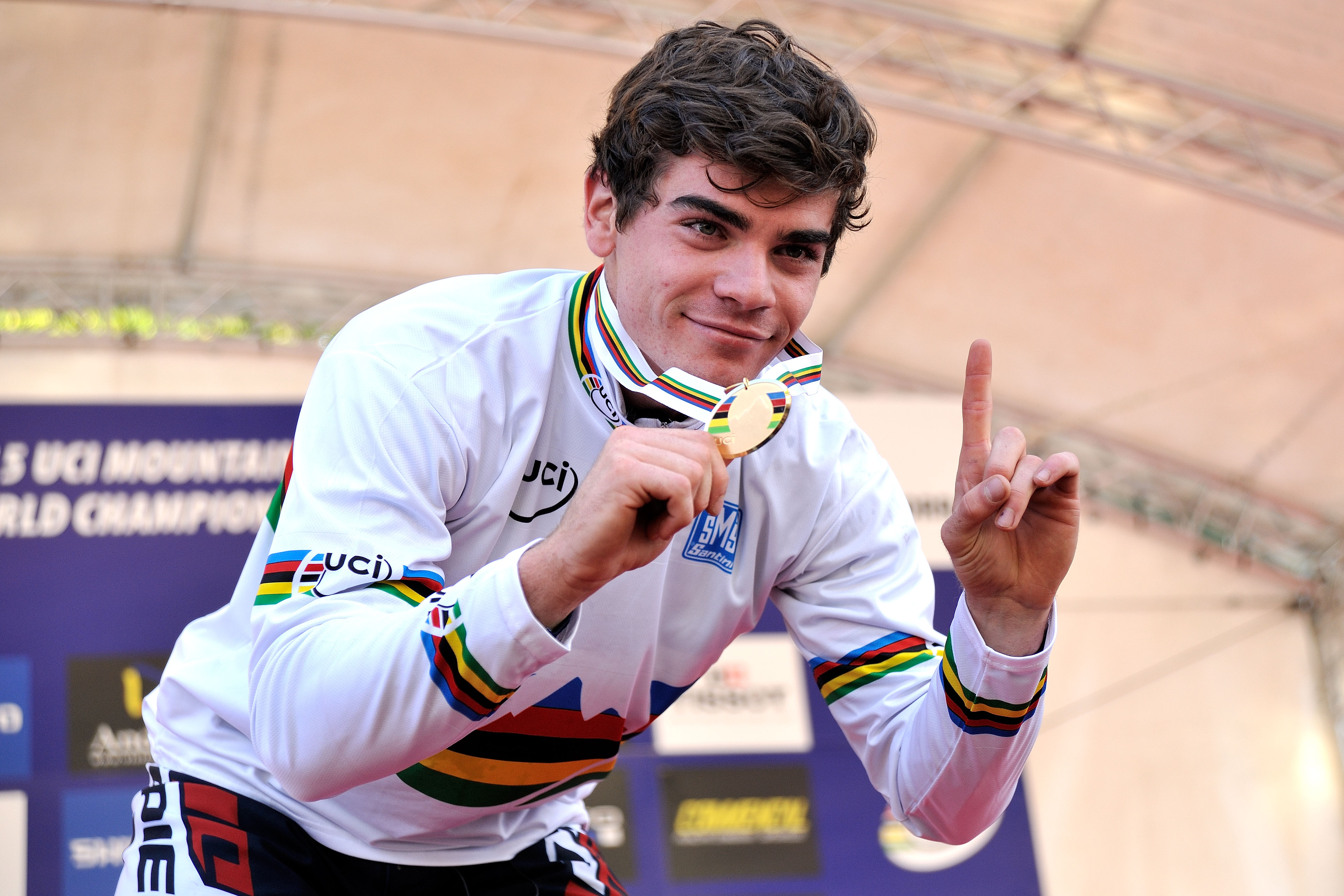
- Loïc Bruni during the 1st round of the World Cup in Lourdes in 2015

Personal information
- Nicknames: Elvar máni, SuperBruni
- Born: 13 May 1994 (age 32) Nice, France

Cycling career
- Sport: Cycling
- Current team: Specialized Gravity
- Discipline: Mountain biking
- Rider type: Downhill

Professional team
- 2015–present: Specialized/Fox racing

Major wins
- 2019, 2021, 2023 and 2024 UCI Downhill Overall World Champion 2015, 2017, 2018, 2019 and 2022 UCI World Champion in Vallnord (Andorra), Cairns (Australia), Lenzerheide (switzerland) Mont Sainte-Anne (Canada) and Les Gets (France)
Medal record
Representing France
Men's mountain bike racing
World Championships
Gold medal – first place	2012 Leogang	Junior downhill
Gold medal – first place	2015 Vallnord	Downhill
Gold medal – first place	2017 Cairns	Downhill
Gold medal – first place	2018 Lenzerheide	Downhill
Gold medal – first place	2019 Mont Sainte-Anne	Downhill
Gold medal – first place	2022 Les Gets	Downhill

Loïc Bruni (born 13 May 1994) is a professional French downhill mountain biker. He is a student at Skema Business School.

== Career ==
Going into the 2015 season, Bruni was one of the favourites. For that season, he came 2nd in the world rankings on the Union Cycliste Internationale (UCI) Downhill Mountain Bike circuit. In that season, he qualified first three times, but did not win any of those World Cup races. At the end of the 2015 season, Bruni won the UCI World Championships, which is a stand-alone event not part of the World Cup series. He set the fastest time on his run with two riders left to start: Troy Brosnan and Aaron Gwin. Both Brosnan and Gwin fell on their runs, leaving Bruni as the winner.

== Career summary ==
UCI-DHI World Championships
Season	Event	Venue	Category	Team	Position
2011	UCI-DHI World Championships	Champéry	Junior Men	France National Cycling Team	5th
2012	UCI-DHI World Championships	Leogang	Junior Men	France National Cycling Team	1st
2013	UCI-DHI World Championships	Pietermaritzburg	Elite	France National Cycling Team	11th
2014	UCI-DHI World Championships	Hafjell	Elite	France National Cycling Team	8th
2015	UCI-DHI World Championships	Vallnord	Elite	France National Cycling Team	1st
2016	UCI-DHI World Championships	Val di Sole	Elite	France National Cycling Team	83rd
2017	UCI-DHI World Championships	Cairns	Elite	France National Cycling Team	1st
2018	UCI-DHI World Championships	Lenzerheide	Elite	France National Cycling Team	1st
2019	UCI-DHI World Championships	Mont-Sainte-Anne	Elite	France National Cycling Team	1st
2020	UCI-DHI World Championships	Leogang	Elite	France National Cycling Team	62nd
2021	UCI-DHI World Championships	Val di Sole	Elite	France National Cycling Team	6th
2022	UCI-DHI World Championships	Les Gets	Elite	France National Cycling Team	1st

UCI-DHI World Cups
Season	Event series	Category	Team	Series venue	Position	Final placement
2011	UCI-DHI World Cup Round #1	Elite	Lapierre international	Pietermaritzburg	-	32nd
2011	UCI-DHI World Cup Round #2	Elite	Lapierre international	Fort William	74th	32nd
2011	UCI-DHI World Cup Round #3	Elite	Lapierre international	Leogang	47th	32nd
2011	UCI-DHI World Cup Round #4	Elite	Lapierre international	Mont-Sainte-Anne	31st	32nd
2011	UCI-DHI World Cup Round #5	Elite	Lapierre international	Windham	14th	32nd
2011	UCI-DHI World Cup Round #6	Elite	Lapierre international	La Bresse	31st	32nd
2011	UCI-DHI World Cup Round #7	Elite	Lapierre international	Val di Sole	17th	32nd
2012	UCI-DHI World Cup Round #1	Elite	Lapierre international	Pietermaritzburg	26th	18th
2012	UCI-DHI World Cup Round #2	Elite	Lapierre international	Val di Sole	11th	18th
2012	UCI-DHI World Cup Round #3	Elite	Lapierre international	Fort William	16th	18th
2012	UCI-DHI World Cup Round #4	Elite	Lapierre international	Mont-Sainte-Anne	-	18th
2012	UCI-DHI World Cup Round #5	Elite	Lapierre international	Windham	5th	18th
2012	UCI-DHI World Cup Round #6	Elite	Lapierre international	Val d'Isère	67th	18th
2012	UCI-DHI World Cup Round #7	Elite	Lapierre international	Hafjell	21st	18th
2013	UCI-DHI World Cup Round #1	Elite	Lapierre Gravity Republic	Fort William	26th	4th
2013	UCI-DHI World Cup Round #2	Elite	Lapierre Gravity Republic	Val di Sole	4th	4th
2013	UCI-DHI World Cup Round #3	Elite	Lapierre Gravity Republic	Vallnord	8th	4th
2013	UCI-DHI World Cup Round #4	Elite	Lapierre Gravity Republic	Mont-Sainte-Anne	15th	4th
2013	UCI-DHI World Cup Round #5	Elite	Lapierre Gravity Republic	Hafjell	33rd	4th
2013	UCI-DHI World Cup Round #6	Elite	Lapierre Gravity Republic	Leogang	2nd	4th
2014	UCI-DHI World Cup Round #1	Elite	Lapierre Gravity Republic	Pietermaritzburg	4th	10th
2014	UCI-DHI World Cup Round #2	Elite	Lapierre Gravity Republic	Cairns	17th	10th
2014	UCI-DHI World Cup Round #3	Elite	Lapierre Gravity Republic	Fort William	12th	10th
2014	UCI-DHI World Cup Round #4	Elite	Lapierre Gravity Republic	Leogang	27th	10th
2014	UCI-DHI World Cup Round #5	Elite	Lapierre Gravity Republic	Mont-Sainte-Anne	9th	10th
2014	UCI-DHI World Cup Round #6	Elite	Lapierre Gravity Republic	Windham	80th	10th
2014	UCI-DHI World Cup Round #7	Elite	Lapierre Gravity Republic	Méribel	4th	10th
2015	UCI-DHI World Cup Round #1	Elite	Lapierre Gravity Republic	Lourdes	2nd	2nd
2015	UCI-DHI World Cup Round #2	Elite	Lapierre Gravity Republic	Fort William	7th	2nd
2015	UCI-DHI World Cup Round #3	Elite	Lapierre Gravity Republic	Leogang	8th	2nd
2015	UCI-DHI World Cup Round #4	Elite	Lapierre Gravity Republic	Lenzerheide	2nd	2nd
2015	UCI-DHI World Cup Round #5	Elite	Lapierre Gravity Republic	Mont-Sainte-Anne	2nd	2nd
2015	UCI-DHI World Cup Round #6	Elite	Lapierre Gravity Republic	Windham	66th	2nd
2015	UCI-DHI World Cup Round #7	Elite	Lapierre Gravity Republic	Val di Sole	2nd	2nd
2016	UCI-DHI World Cup Round #1	Elite	Specialized Gravity Powered by Sram	Lourdes	14th	6th
2016	UCI-DHI World Cup Round #2	Elite	Specialized Gravity Powered by Sram	Cairns	1st	6th
2016	UCI-DHI World Cup Round #3	Elite	Specialized Gravity Powered by Sram	Fort William	-	6th
2016	UCI-DHI World Cup Round #4	Elite	Specialized Gravity Powered by Sram	Leogang	-	6th
2016	UCI-DHI World Cup Round #5	Elite	Specialized Gravity Powered by Sram	Lenzerheide	-	6th
2016	UCI-DHI World Cup Round #6	Elite	Specialized Gravity Powered by Sram	Mont-Sainte-Anne	3rd	6th
2016	UCI-DHI World Cup Round #7	Elite	Specialized Gravity Powered by Sram	Vallnord	3rd	6th
2017	UCI-DHI World Cup Round #1	Elite	Specialized Gravity	Lourdes	71st	4th
2017	UCI-DHI World Cup Round #2	Elite	Specialized Gravity	Fort William	14th	4th
2017	UCI-DHI World Cup Round #3	Elite	Specialized Gravity	Leogang	DNS	4th
2017	UCI-DHI World Cup Round #4	Elite	Specialized Gravity	Vallnord	4th	4th
2017	UCI-DHI World Cup Round #5	Elite	Specialized Gravity	Lenzerheide	7th	4th
2017	UCI-DHI World Cup Round #6	Elite	Specialized Gravity	Mont-Sainte-Anne	4th	4th
2017	UCI-DHI World Cup Round #7	Elite	Specialized Gravity	Val di Sole	3rd	4th
2018	UCI-DHI World Cup Round #1	Elite	Specialized Gravity	Lošinj	DNF	7th
2018	UCI-DHI World Cup Round #2	Elite	Specialized Gravity	Fort William	5th	7th
2018	UCI-DHI World Cup Round #3	Elite	Specialized Gravity	Leogang	11th	7th
2018	UCI-DHI World Cup Round #4	Elite	Specialized Gravity	Val di Sole	28th	7th
2018	UCI-DHI World Cup Round #5	Elite	Specialized Gravity	Vallnord	8th	7th
2018	UCI-DHI World Cup Round #6	Elite	Specialized Gravity	Mont-Sainte-Anne	1st	7th
2018	UCI-DHI World Cup Round #7	Elite	Specialized Gravity	La Bresse	6th	7th
2019	UCI-DHI World Cup Round #1	Elite	Specialized Gravity	Maribor	1st	1st
2019	UCI-DHI World Cup Round #2	Elite	Specialized Gravity	Fort William	8th	1st
2019	UCI-DHI World Cup Round #3	Elite	Specialized Gravity	Leogang	1st	1st
2019	UCI-DHI World Cup Round #4	Elite	Specialized Gravity	Vallnord	1st	1st
2019	UCI-DHI World Cup Round #5	Elite	Specialized Gravity	Les Gets	2nd	1st
2019	UCI-DHI World Cup Round #6	Elite	Specialized Gravity	Val di Sole	2nd	1st
2019	UCI-DHI World Cup Round #7	Elite	Specialized Gravity	Lenzerheide	3rd	1st
2019	UCI-DHI World Cup Round #8	Elite	Specialized Gravity	Snowshoe	4th	1st
2020	UCI-DHI World Cup Round #1	Elite	Specialized Gravity	Maribor	20th	2nd
2020	UCI-DHI World Cup Round #2	Elite	Specialized Gravity	Maribor	2nd	2nd
2020	UCI-DHI World Cup Round #3	Elite	Specialized Gravity	Lousã	3rd	2nd
2020	UCI-DHI World Cup Round #4	Elite	Specialized Gravity	Lousã	1st	2nd
2021	UCI-DHI World Cup Round #1	Elite	Specialized Gravity	(Austria) Leogang	10th	1st
2021	UCI-DHI World Cup Round #2	Elite	Specialized Gravity	(France) Les Gets	50th	1st
2021	UCI-DHI World Cup Round #3	Elite	Specialized Gravity	(Slovenia) Maribor	5th	1st
2021	UCI-DHI World Cup Round #4	Elite	Specialized Gravity	(Switzerland) Lenzerheide	2nd	1st
2021	UCI-DHI World Cup Round #5	Elite	Specialized Gravity	(United States) Snowshoe	2nd	1st
2021	UCI-DHI World Cup Round #6	Elite	Specialized Gravity	(United States) Snowshoe	1st	1st
