= 1995 UCI Mountain Bike World Championships =

- Venue: Kirchzarten, Germany
- Date: 18–19 September 1995

The 1995 UCI Mountain Bike World Championships were held in Kirchzarten, Germany from 18 to 19 September 1995. These were the sixth annual UCI world championships in mountain biking and the first to be held in Germany.

Alison Sydor of Canada successfully defended her world title in the women's cross country. The men's cross country was won by Bart Brentjens of the Netherlands, who would win the first Olympic gold medal in men's cross country the following year at the 1996 Summer Olympics in Atlanta.

Nicolas Vouilloz of France won the men's downhill in his first year in the elite category, after having won the junior men's downhill world title the three previous years. Leigh Donovan of the United States won the women's downhill.

== Medal summary ==
=== Men's events ===
Event	Gold	Silver	Bronze
Cross-country	Bart Brentjens (NED)	Miguel Martinez (FRA)	Jan-Erik Ostergaard (DEN)
Downhill	Nicolas Vouilloz (FRA)	François Gachet (FRA)	Mike King (USA)
Junior downhill	Cédric Gracia (FRA)	Marcus Klausman (GER)	Florent Poussin (FRA)

=== Women's events ===
Event	Gold	Silver	Bronze
Cross-country	Alison Sydor (CAN)	Silvia Fürst (SUI)	Chantal Daucourt (SUI)
Downhill	Leigh Donovan (USA)	Mercedes Gonzalez (ESP)	Giovanna Bonazzi (ITA)
Junior downhill	Anne-Caroline Chausson (FRA)	Nolvenn le Caër (FRA)	Marielle Saner (SUI)

=== Medal table ===
Rank	Nation	Gold	Silver	Bronze	Total
1	France (FRA)	3	3	1	7
2	United States (USA)	1	0	1	2
3	Canada (CAN)	1	0	0	1
3	Netherlands (NED)	1	0	0	1
5	Switzerland (SUI)	0	1	2	3
6	Germany (GER)	0	1	0	1
6	Spain (ESP)	0	1	0	1
8	Denmark (DEN)	0	0	1	1
8	Italy (ITA)	0	0	1	1
Totals (9 entries)		6	6	6	18
