= 1998 UCI Mountain Bike World Championships =

- Venue: Mont-Sainte-Anne, QC, Canada
- Date: 14–20 September 1998
- Events: 9

The 1998 UCI Mountain Bike World Championships were held in Mont-Sainte-Anne, Quebec, Canada from 14 to 20 September 1998. The disciplines included were cross-country and downhill. The event was the 9th edition of the UCI Mountain Bike World Championships and the second to be held in Canada, following the 1992 World Championships in Bromont.

== Medal summary ==
=== Men's events ===
Event	Gold	Silver	Bronze
Cross-country	Christophe Dupouey (FRA)	Jérôme Chiotti (FRA)	Filip Meirhaeghe (BEL)
Under 23 cross-country	Miguel Martinez (FRA)	Christoph Sauser (SUI)	Roel Paulissen (BEL)
Junior cross-country	Julien Absalon (FRA)	Ryder Hesjedal (CAN)	Fredrik Modin (cyclist) (SWE)
Downhill	Nicolas Vouilloz (FRA)	Gerwin Peters (NED)	Mickael Pascal (FRA)
Junior downhill	Fabien Barel (FRA)	Franck Parolin (FRA)	Nathan Rennie (AUS)

=== Women's events ===
Event	Gold	Silver	Bronze
Cross-country	Laurence Leboucher (FRA)	Gunn-Rita Dahle (NOR)	Alison Sydor (CAN)
Junior cross-country	Cecile Rode (FRA)	Severine Hanson (FRA)	Sandrine Guironnet (FRA)
Downhill	Anne-Caroline Chausson (FRA)	Nolvenn LeCaer (FRA)	Cheri Elliott (USA)
Junior downhill	Sari Jorgensen (SUI)	Sabrina Jonnier (FRA)	Johanna Rubel-Todt (GER)

=== Medal table ===
Rank	Nation	Gold	Silver	Bronze	Total
1	France (FRA)	8	5	2	15
2	Switzerland (SUI)	1	1	0	2
3	Canada (CAN)	0	1	1	2
4	Netherlands (NED)	0	1	0	1
4	Norway (NOR)	0	1	0	1
6	Belgium (BEL)	0	0	2	2
7	Australia (AUS)	0	0	1	1
7	Germany (GER)	0	0	1	1
7	Sweden (SWE)	0	0	1	1
7	United States (USA)	0	0	1	1
Totals (10 entries)		9	9	9	27

== See also ==
- 1998 UCI Mountain Bike World Cup
