= Fabien Barel =

French cyclist

Personal information
- Born: 26 July 1980 (age 46) Nice, France

Cycling career
- Sport: Cycling
- Discipline: Downhill mountain biking
- Role: Rider
Medal record
Representing France
Men's mountain bike racing
World Championships
Gold medal – first place	2004 Les Gets	Downhill
Gold medal – first place	2005 Livigno	Downhill
Gold medal – first place	1998 Mont-Sainte-Anne	Junior downhill
Silver medal – second place	2007 Fort William	Downhill
Bronze medal – third place	2003 Lugano	Downhill
European Championships
Bronze medal – third place	2000 Vars	Downhill

Fabien Barel (born 26 July 1980) is a French former professional downhill mountain biker. He won three world downhill titles during his career. He announced his retirement from downhill in 2011, and now competes in enduro races. In 2013, he signed with the new Canyon Bicycles Factory Enduro Team.
