= Michael Hannah =

Australian mountain biker (born 1983)

Personal information
- Born: 21 November 1983 (age 42) Swan Hill, Australia
- Height: 6 ft 0 in (1.83 m)
- Weight: 176 lb (80 kg)

Cycling career
- Sport: Cycling
- Current team: NS bikes UR
- Discipline: Mountain bike racing
- Rider type: Downhill
Medal record
Representing Australia
Men's mountain bike racing
World Championships
Silver medal – second place	2000 Sierra Nevada	Junior downhill
Silver medal – second place	2013 Pietermaritzburg	Downhill
Silver medal – second place	2017 Cairns	Downhill
Bronze medal – third place	2009 Canberra	Downhill

Michael Hannah (born 21 November 1983 in Swan Hill, Victoria, Australia) is a professional downhill mountain biker and the older brother of Tracey Hannah. He is the understudy of Roslin Kummin and is sponsored by Urata. Sometimes he likes to go spearfishing and camping, but most of his time is spent to riding/training.

He is the older brother of female downhill mountain biker Tracey Hannah.

== Team ==
Hannah is currently racing for the NS bikes UR team.

== Achievements ==
2018 Winner at Air Dh in Rotorua, New Zealand

2017 2nd place World Cup in Cairns, Australia

2016 3rd place World Cup in Cairns, Australia

2006 Downhill World Cup win in Vigo, Spain

2013 2nd place World Championships, South Africa

2012 4th place World Championships, Austria

2009 3rd place World Championships, Australia

2000 2nd place Junior World Championships, Spain

1994 2nd place BMX World Championships, USA

1994, 1995, 1996 Australian National BMX Champion

2000 Australian Junior Men's Downhill Champion

2005, 2009, 2011, 2013 Australian Elite Men's Downhill Champion
