= Mammoth Kamikaze =

The Mammoth Kamikaze or Kamikaze Downhill, which takes place at Mammoth Mountain in Mammoth Lakes, California, is one of the oldest and fastest downhill cycling races.

== Track ==
Unlike typical downhill courses of the 21st century, the race follows in essence the path of the traditional access fire road. However, while average downhill races these days runs to 35mph, Mammoth racers were clocking 55-65mph on mostly rigid or semi-rigid bikes with flat handlebars.

== History ==
The name Kamikaze Downhill was co-authored by the Mountain Bike Hall of Fame inductee Bill Cockroft.

== Winners ==
This list is incomplete.

- John Tomac (2004, 2005) USA
- Philippe Perakis (1991) Switzerland
- Jimmy Deaton (1985, 1988, 1992, 1993, 1994) USA
- Myles Rockwell (1995) USA
- Cindy Devine (3 times by 1992) Canada
- Cindy Whitehead (1987) USA
