= Lea Davison =

American cyclist

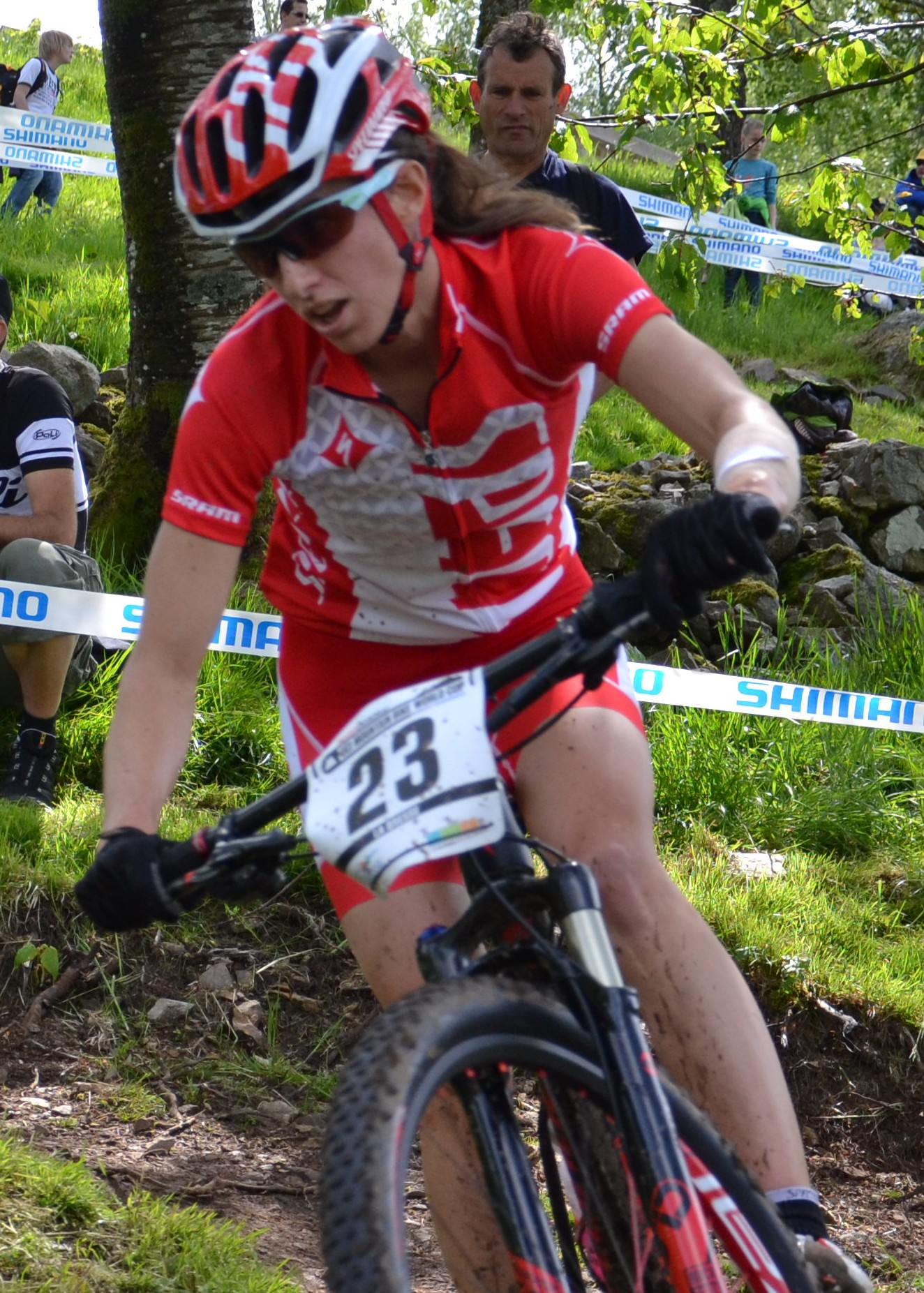
- Lea Davison in 2012

Personal information
- Born: May 19, 1983 (age 43)
- Height: 5 ft 6 in (168 cm)
- Weight: 121 lb (55 kg)

Cycling career
- Sport: Cycling
Medal record
Women's Mountain bike racing
Representing United States
World Championships
Silver medal – second place	2016 Nové Město	Cross-country
Bronze medal – third place	2014 Hafjell	Cross-country

Lea Davison (born May 19, 1983) is an American cross-country mountain biker from Jericho, Vermont. At the 2012 Summer Olympics, she competed in the Women's cross-country at Hadleigh Farm, finishing in 11th place, and she finished 7th in the same event at the 2016 Summer Olympics in Rio de Janeiro.
