= Alison Sydor =

Canadian cyclist

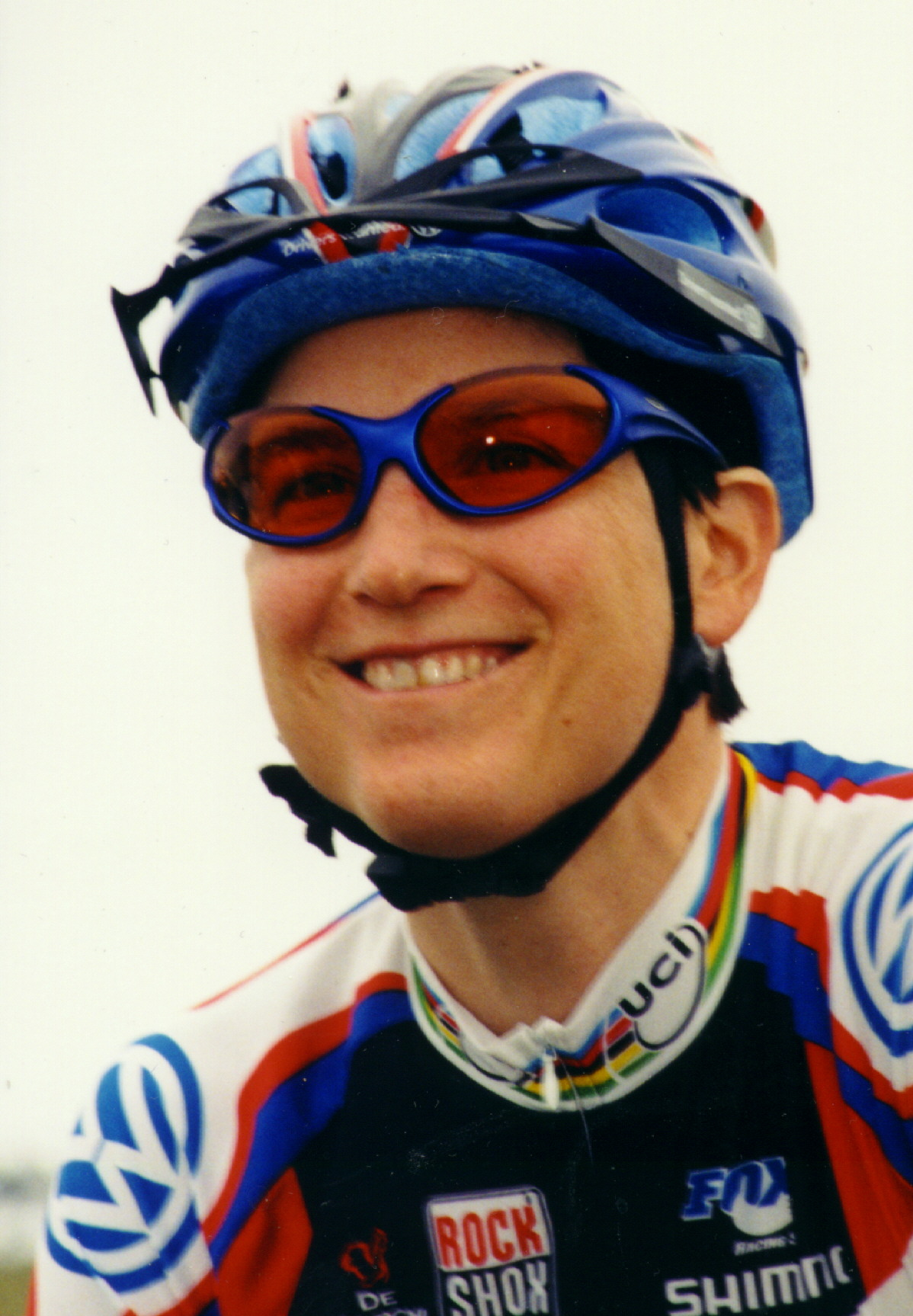
- Sydor at the 2001 Sea Otter Classic

Personal information
- Full name: Alison Jane Sydor
- Born: September 9, 1966 (age 60) Edmonton, Alberta, Canada

Cycling career
- Sport: Cycling
- Disciplines: Mountain bike and road
- Role: Rider
- Rider type: Mountain bike: cross-country

Major wins
- 2008 Absa Cape Epic Women's Category 2009 Absa Cape Epic Mixed Category
Medal record
Representing Canada
Women's mountain bike racing
Olympic Games
Silver medal – second place	1996 Atlanta	Cross-country
World Championships
Gold medal – first place	1994 Vail	Cross-country
Gold medal – first place	1995 Kirchzarten	Cross-country
Gold medal – first place	1996 Cairns	Cross-country
Gold medal – first place	2002 Kaprun	Team cross-country
Silver medal – second place	1992 Bromont	Cross-country
Silver medal – second place	1999 Åre	Cross-country
Silver medal – second place	2000 Sierra Nevada	Cross-country
Silver medal – second place	2001 Vail	Cross-country
Silver medal – second place	2003 Lugano	Cross-country
Bronze medal – third place	1998 Mont-Sainte-Anne	Cross-country
Bronze medal – third place	1999 Åre	Team cross-country
Bronze medal – third place	2004 Les Gets	Cross-country
Women's road bicycle racing
World Championships
Bronze medal – third place	1991 Stuttgart	Road race

Alison Jane Sydor (born September 9, 1966) is a Canadian retired professional cross-country mountain cyclist. She began cycling at age 20 and is a graduate of the University of Victoria. She won a silver medal at the 1996 Summer Olympics in mountain bike, and has won three world mountain bike championships gold medals (1994 in Vail, Colorado; 1995 in Kirchzarten, Germany; and 1996 in Cairns, Australia) and the 2002 relay race in Kaprun, Austria.

Sydor has also won five silver medals (1992, 1999, 2000, 2001 and 2003) and three bronze (1998, 1999 (relay race), 2004) at mountain bike world championships, and one bronze at the road world championships (1991). In addition, Sydor has won 17 World Cup (cross-country) races in her career, and for 13 consecutive years (1992–2004) never finished outside of the top-5 at the world championships.

In 1995 and 1996, Sydor was awarded the Velma Springstead Trophy as Canada's top female athlete.

In September 2007 Sydor was inducted into the Mountain Bike Hall of Fame.

In December 2007 it was announced that Sydor would be inducted into British Columbia Sports Hall of Fame Class of 2008 at a ceremony on May 29, 2008.

Sydor and teammate Pia Sundstedt won the Women's Category in the Absa Cape Epic in 2008. Sydor then came back to win the Mixed Category with Nico Pfitzenmaier in 2009.

In 2013, Sydor was inducted into Canada's Sports Hall of Fame.

== Major results ==
UCI Mountain Bike & Trials World Championships

- Gold Medal (Cross Country: 1994, 1995, 1996; Team Relay: 2002)
- Silver Medal (Cross Country: 1992, 1999, 2000, 2001, 2003)
- Bronze Medal (Cross Country: 1998, 2004; Team Relay: 1999)

UCI Road World Championships

- Bronze Medal (1991)

Summer Olympics

- Silver Medal (1996)
- 4th Place (2004)
- 5th Place (2000)

Commonwealth Games

- Silver Medal (Team Time Trial: 1994)
- Bronze Medal (Road Race: 1994)

Pan American Games

- Gold Medal (1995)
- Silver Medal (1999)

Absa Cape Epic

- 1st Place Ladies Category 2008
- 1st Place Mixed Category 2009
