= 1992 UCI Mountain Bike World Championships =

International sports competition

- Venue: Bromont, QC, Canada
- Date: 16–17 September 1992

The 1992 UCI Mountain Bike World Championships were held in Bromont, Quebec, Canada from 16 to 17 September 1992.

== Medal summary ==
=== Men's events ===
Event	Gold	Silver	Bronze
Cross-country	Henrik Djernis (DEN)	Thomas Frischknecht (SUI)	David Baker (GBR)
Downhill	Dave Cullinan (USA)	Jimmy Deaton (USA)	Christian Taillefer (FRA)
Junior downhill	Nicolas Vouilloz (FRA)	Tomas Misser (ESP)	Thomas Damiami (ITA)

=== Women's events ===
Event	Gold	Silver	Bronze
Cross-country	Silvia Fürst (SUI)	Alison Sydor (CAN)	Ruthie Matthes (USA)
Downhill	Juli Furtado (USA)	Kim Sonier (USA)	Cindy Devine (CAN)
Junior downhill	Laetitia Holweck (FRA)	Rita Burgi (SUI)	Malin Lindgren (SWE)

=== Medal table ===
Rank	Nation	Gold	Silver	Bronze	Total
1	United States (USA)	2	2	1	5
2	France (FRA)	2	0	1	3
3	Switzerland (SUI)	1	2	0	3
4	Denmark (DEN)	1	0	0	1
5	Canada (CAN)	0	1	1	2
6	Spain (ESP)	0	1	0	1
7	Great Britain (GBR)	0	0	1	1
7	Italy (ITA)	0	0	1	1
7	Sweden (SWE)	0	0	1	1
Totals (9 entries)		6	6	6	18
