= Albert Iten =

Swiss mountain biker

Personal information
- Born: 27 May 1962 (age 64) Zürich, Switzerland

Cycling career
- Sport: Cycling
- Discipline: Mountain bike
- Role: Rider
- Rider type: Downhill; Cross-country
Medal record
Representing Switzerland
Mountain bike racing
World Championships
Gold medal – first place	1991 Ciocco	Downhill
European Championships
Gold medal – first place	1994 Métabief	Cross-country
Silver medal – second place	1992 Möllbrücke	Downhill
Bronze medal – third place	1991 La Bourboule	Downhill

Albert Iten (born 27 May 1962) is a Swiss former professional cross-country and downhill mountain biker. He won the UCI Downhill World Championships in 1991. He also won the cross-country event at the 1994 European Mountain Bike Championships.
