= UCI Mountain Bike & Trials World Championships – Junior women's downhill =

The junior women's downhill is an event at the annual UCI Mountain Bike World Championships. It is restricted to competitors who are under 19 years of age at the end of the calendar year. It has been held since the second world championships in the 1991 UCI Mountain Bike World Championships

== Medalists ==
Championships	Gold	Silver	Bronze
1991 Ciocco	Rita Bürgi; Switzerland	Melanie Eberle; Germany	Stéphanie Ethoin; France
1992 Bromont	Laetitia Holweck; France	Rita Bürgi; Switzerland	Malin Lindgren; Sweden
1993 Métabief	Anne-Caroline Chausson; France	Nolvenn Le Caër; France	Helen Mortimer; Great Britain
1994 Vail	Anne-Caroline Chausson; France	Marielle Saner; Switzerland	Mona Fee; France
1995 Kirchzarten	Anne-Caroline Chausson; France	Nolvenn Le Caër; France	Marielle Saner; Switzerland
1996 Cairns	Nolvenn Le Caër; France	Sabrina Jonnier; France	Sari Jörgensen; Switzerland
1997 Château-d'Œx	Sara Stieger; Switzerland	Tracy Moseley; Great Britain	Sabrina Jonnier; France
1998 Mont-Sainte-Anne	Sari Jörgensen; Switzerland	Sabrina Jonnier; France	Johanna Rübel-Tödt; Germany
1999 Åre	Sabrina Jonnier; France	Kathy Pruitt; United States	Helen Gaskell; Great Britain
2000 Sierra Nevada	Kathy Pruitt; United States	Helen Gaskell; Great Britain	Fionn Griffiths; Great Britain
2001 Vail	Mio Suemasa; Japan	Céline Gros; France	Helen Gaskell; Great Britain
2002 Kaprun	Emmeline Ragot; France	Claire Bauchet; France	Diana Marggraff; Ecuador
2003 Lugano	Emmeline Ragot; France	Scarlett Hagen; New Zealand	Bernardita Pizarro; Chile
2004 Les Gets	Scarlett Hagen; New Zealand	Rachel Atherton; Great Britain	Audrey Le Corguillé; France
2005 Livigno	Rachel Atherton; Great Britain	Scarlett Hagen; New Zealand	Micayla Gatto; Canada
2006 Rotorua	Tracey Hannah; Australia	Floriane Pugin; France	Micayla Gatto; Canada
2007 Fort William	Floriane Pugin; France	Katy Curd; Great Britain	Myriam Nicole; France
2008 Val Di Sole	Anaïs Pajot; France	Myriam Nicole; France	Mélanie Pugin; France
2009 Canberra	Anaïs Pajot; France	Julie Berteaux; France	Holly Baarspul; Australia
2010 Mont-Sainte-Anne	Lauren Rosser; Canada	Fanny Lombard; France	Julie Berteaux; France
2011 Champery	Manon Carpenter; Great Britain	Agnès Delest; France	Lauren Rosser; Canada
2012 Leogang-Saalfelden	Holly Feniak; Canada	Tahnée Seagrave; Great Britain	Danielle Beacroft; Australia
2013 Pietermaritzburg	Tahnée Seagrave; Great Britain	Danielle Beacroft; Australia	Tegan Molloy; Australia
2014 Hafjell	Tegan Molloy; Australia	Viktoria Gimenez; France	Marine Cabirou; France
2015 Vallnord	Marine Cabirou; France	Viktoria Gimenez; France	Lilla Megyaszai; Hungary
2016 Val di Sole	Alessia Missiaggia; Italy	Samantha Kingshill; United States	Flora Lesoin; France
2017 Cairns	Mélanie Chappaz; France	Shania Rawson; New Zealand	Flora Lesoin; France
2018 Lenzerhiede	Valentina Höll; Austria	Anna Newkirk; United States	Mille Johnset; Norway
2019 Mont-Saint-Anne	Valentina Höll; Austria	Mille Johnset; Norway	Anna Newkirk; United States
2020 (Austria) Leogang	Lauryne Chappaz; France	Sophie Gutöhrle; Austria	Léona Pierrini; France
2021 (Italy) Val Di Sole	Izabela Yankova; Bulgaria	Kine Haugom; Norway	Gracey Hemstreet; Canada
2022 (France) Les Gets	Jenna Hastings; New Zealand	Gracey Hemstreet; Canada	Valentina Roa; Colombia
2023 (United Kingdom) Glasgow	Erice van Leuven; New Zealand	Poppy Lane; New Zealand	Sacha Earnest; New Zealand
2024 (Andorra) Pal–Arinsal	Erice van Leuven; New Zealand	Ella Svegby; Sweden	Sacha Earnest; New Zealand
2025 (Switzerland) Valais	Rosa Zierl; Austria	Ellie Hulsebosch; New Zealand	Aletha Ostgaard; United States

== Medal table ==
Rank	Nation	Gold	Silver	Bronze	Total
1	France	14	13	11	38
2	New Zealand	4	5	2	11
3	Great Britain	3	5	3	11
4	Switzerland	3	2	2	7
5	Austria	3	1	0	4
6	Canada	2	1	4	7
7	Australia	2	1	3	6
8	United States	1	3	2	6
9	Bulgaria	1	0	0	1
9	Italy	1	0	0	1
9	Japan	1	0	0	1
12	Norway	0	2	1	3
13	Germany	0	1	2	3
14	Sweden	0	1	1	2
15	Chile	0	0	1	1
15	Colombia	0	0	1	1
15	Ecuador	0	0	1	1
15	Hungary	0	0	1	1
Totals (18 entries)		35	35	35	105
