= 1994 UCI Mountain Bike World Championships =

- Venue: Vail, CO, United States
- Date: 18–19 September 1994

The 1994 UCI Mountain Bike World Championships were held in Vail, Colorado, United States from 18 to 19 September 1994.

== Medal summary ==
=== Men's events ===
Event	Gold	Silver	Bronze
Cross-country	Henrik Djernis (DEN)	David Juarez (USA)	Bart Brentjens (NED)
Junior cross-country	Miguel Martinez (FRA)	Cadel Evans (AUS)	Thomas Hochstrasser (SUI)
Downhill	François Gachet (FRA)	Tommy Johansson (SWE)	Corrado Herin (ITA)
Junior downhill	Nicolas Vouilloz (FRA)	Pau Misse (ESP)	Cédric Gracia (FRA)

=== Women's events ===
Event	Gold	Silver	Bronze
Cross-country	Alison Sydor (CAN)	Susan DeMattei (USA)	Sara Ballantyne (USA)
Downhill	Missy Giove (USA)	Sophie Kempf (FRA)	Giovanna Bonazzi (ITA)
Junior downhill	Anne-Caroline Chausson (FRA)	Marielle Saner (SUI)	Mona Fee (FRA)

=== Medal table ===
Rank	Nation	Gold	Silver	Bronze	Total
1	France (FRA)	4	1	2	7
2	United States (USA)	1	2	1	4
3	Canada (CAN)	1	0	0	1
3	Denmark (DEN)	1	0	0	1
5	Switzerland (SUI)	0	1	1	2
6	Australia (AUS)	0	1	0	1
6	Spain (ESP)	0	1	0	1
6	Sweden (SWE)	0	1	0	1
9	Italy (ITA)	0	0	2	2
10	Netherlands (NED)	0	0	1	1
Totals (10 entries)		7	7	7	21
