= UCI Mountain Bike & Trials World Championships – Junior men's downhill =

The junior men's downhill is an event at the annual UCI Mountain Bike & Trials World Championships. It is restricted to competitors who are under 19 years of age at the end of the calendar year. It has been held since the inaugural championships in 1990.

== Medalists ==
Championships	Gold	Silver	Bronze
1990 Durango	Joey Irwin; United States	David Hemming; Great Britain	Dwayne Norris; New Zealand
1991 Ciocco	Bruno Zanchi; Italy	Tomás Misser; Spain	Vernet de Ceuster; Belgium
1992 Bromont	Nicolas Vouilloz; France	Tomás Misser; Spain	Thomas Damiami; Italy
1993 Métabief	Nicolas Vouilloz; France	Marcus Klausman; Germany	Karim Amour; France
1994 Vail	Nicolas Vouilloz; France	Pau Misser; Spain	Cédric Gracia; France
1995 Kirchzarten	Cédric Gracia; France	Marcus Klausman; Germany	Florent Poussin; France
1996 Cairns	Andy Büler; Switzerland	Cédric Gracia; France	Maxime Gardella; France
1997 Château-d'Œx	Mickaël Pascal; France	David Vázquez; Spain	Tobias Westman; Sweden
1998 Mont-Sainte-Anne	Fabien Barel; France	Franck Parolin; France	Nathan Rennie; Australia
1999 Åre	Nathan Rennie; Australia	David Wardell; Great Britain	Jarrod Rando; Australia
2000 Sierra Nevada	Julien Poomans; France	Michael Hannah; Australia	Jean-Paul Labossiere; France
2001 Vail	Ben Cory; Australia	Julien Camellini; France	Sam Hill; Australia
2002 Kaprun	Sam Hill; Australia	Gee Atherton; Great Britain	Justin Havukainen; Australia
2003 Lugano	Sam Hill; Australia	Gee Atherton; Great Britain	Cyrille Kurtz; France
2004 Les Gets	Romain Saladini; France	Florent Payet; France	Kyle Strait; United States
2005 Livigno	Amiel Cavalier; Australia	Brendan Fairclough; Great Britain	Liam Panozzo; Australia
2006 Rotorua	Cameron Cole; New Zealand	Samuel Blenkinsop; New Zealand	Antoine Badouard; France
2007 Fort William	Ruaridh Cunningham; Great Britain	John Swanguen; United States	Matthew Scoles; New Zealand
2008 Val Di Sole	Josh Bryceland; Great Britain	Sam Dale; Great Britain	Rémi Thirion; France
2009 Canberra	Brook MacDonald; New Zealand	Shaun O'Connor; Australia	Danny Hart; Great Britain
2010 Mont-Sainte-Anne	Troy Brosnan; Australia	Neko Mulally; United States	Lewis Buchanan; Great Britain
2011 Champery	Troy Brosnan; Australia	David Trummer; Austria	Guillaume Cauvin; France
2012 Leogang-Saalfelden	Loïc Bruni; France	Richard Rude Jr; United States	Connor Fearon; Australia
2013 Pietermaritzburg	Richard Rude Jr; United States	Loris Vergier; France	Michael Jones; Great Britain
2014 Hafjell	Loris Vergier; France	Laurie Greenland; Great Britain	Jacob Dickson; Ireland
2015 Vallnord	Laurie Greenland; Great Britain	Martin Maes; Belgium	Àlex Marín; Spain
2016 Val di Sole	Finnley Iles; Canada	Magnus Manson; Canada	Gaëtan Vige; France
2017 Cairns	Matt Walker; Great Britain	Joe Breeden; Great Britain	Max Hartenstein; Germany
2018 Lenzerheide	Kade Edwards; Great Britain	Kye A'Hern; Australia	Elliot Jamieson; Canada
2019 (Canada) Mont-Sainte-Anne	Kye A'Hern; Australia	Antoine Vidal; France	Tuhoto-Ariki Pene; New Zealand
2020 (Austria) Leogang	Oisin O Gallaghan; Ireland	Daniel Slack; Great Britain	James Elliott; Great Britain
2021 (Italy) Val Di Sole	Jackson Goldstone; Canada	Jordan Williams; Great Britain	Lachlan Stevens-McNab; New Zealand
2022 (France) Les Gets	Jordan Williams; Great Britain	Remy Meier-Smith; Australia	Davide Cappello; Italy
2023 (United Kingdom) Glasgow	Henri Kiefer; Germany	Bodhi Kuhn; Canada	Léo Abella; France
2024 (Andorra) Pal–Arinsal	Asa Vermette; United States	Max Alran; France	Bode Burke; United States
2025 (Switzerland) Valais	Max Alran; France	Tyler Waite; New Zealand	Till Alran; France

== Medal table ==
Rank	Nation	Gold	Silver	Bronze	Total
1	France	11	7	12	30
2	Australia	8	4	6	18
3	Great Britain	6	10	4	20
4	United States	3	4	2	9
5	New Zealand	2	2	4	8
6	Canada	2	2	1	5
7	Germany	1	2	1	4
8	Italy	1	0	2	3
9	Ireland	1	0	1	2
10	Switzerland	1	0	0	1
11	Spain	0	3	1	4
12	Belgium	0	1	1	2
13	Austria	0	1	0	1
14	Sweden	0	0	1	1
Totals (14 entries)		36	36	36	108
