= François Gachet =

French mountain biker

Personal information
- Born: 17 December 1965 (age 60) Chichilianne, France

Cycling career
- Sport: Cycling
- Discipline: Downhill
- Role: Rider
Medal record
Representing France
Mountain bike racing
World Championships
Gold medal – first place	1994 Vail	Downhill
Silver medal – second place	1995 Kirchzarten	Downhill

François Gachet (born 17 December 1965) is a French former professional downhill mountain biker. He won the UCI Downhill World Championships in 1994 and finished second the following year. He also finished first overall and won four events at the 1994 UCI Downhill World Cup.
