= Iron Horse Bicycles =

American bicycle manufacturer

Iron Horse Bicycles, LLC
- Company type: Private
- Industry: Bicycles
- Founded: 1987; 39 years ago
- Headquarters: Islandia, New York
- Products: Bicycles
- Website: www.ironhorsebikes.com

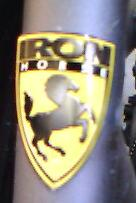
Iron Horse head badge

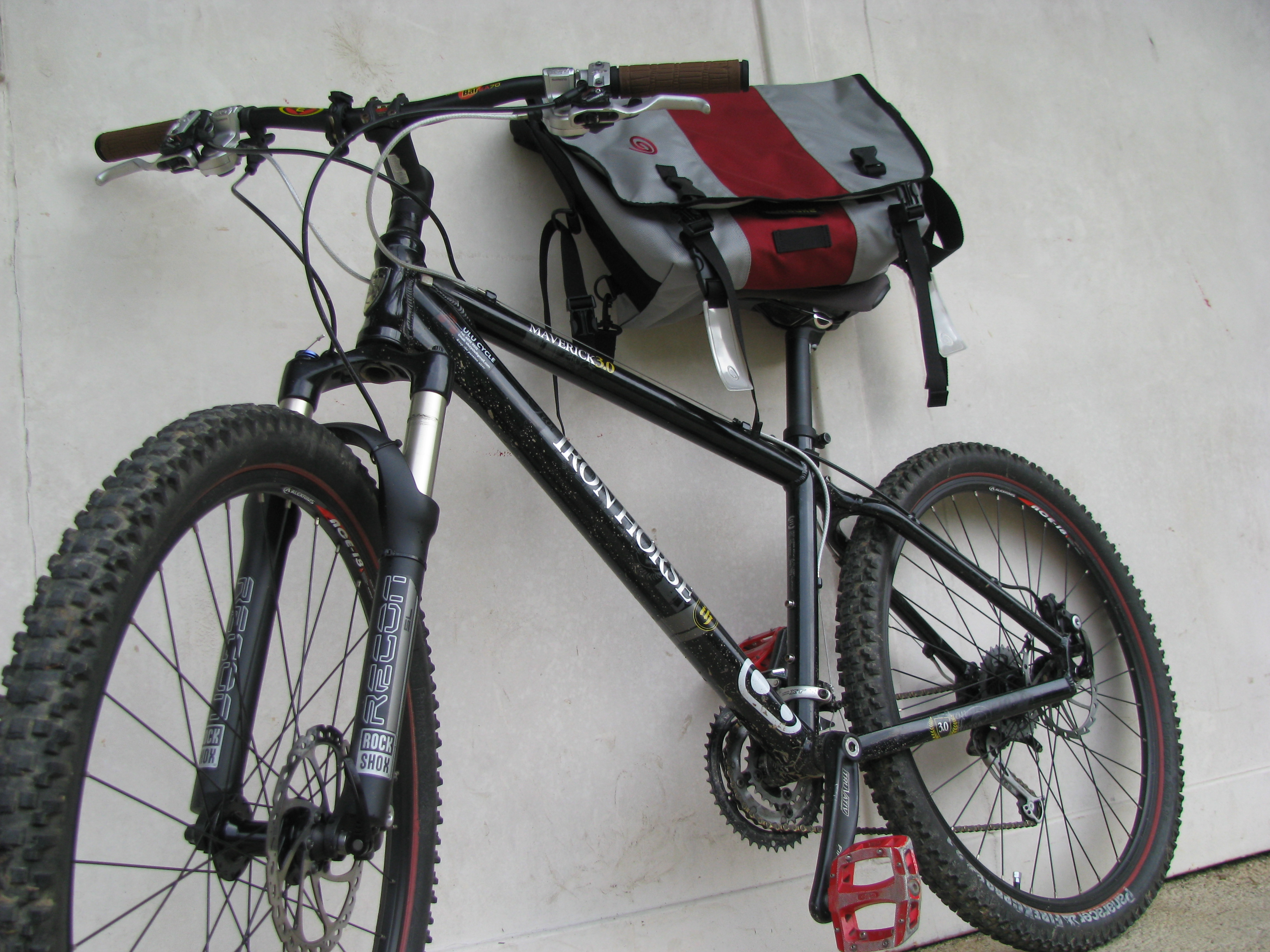
Iron Horse Maverick 3.0 and a Timbuk2 messenger bag.

Iron Horse Bicycles was a manufacturer of bicycles, in Islandia, New York, United States from 1987 to 2009. Its logo was a prancing horse on a mustard-color crest similar to the Ferrari logo. Iron Horse sold racing bikes and mountain bikes, but mainly downhill, freeride, and all mountain.

Iron Horse riders included Dave Cullinan, Sabrina Jonnier, Penny Davidson, Toby Henderson, Leigh Donovan, Pete Loncarevich and Sam Hill. Cullinan won the downhill world championship in 1992 and Sam Hill won the World Championships in 2007 and 2010.

Iron Horse filed for bankruptcy in early 2009. It owed US $5 million to creditors and patent holders. Rear Suspension on a number of Ironhorse performance bikes is referred to as the DW link. The name is derived from the initials of its creator - Dave Weagle, who is a mechanical engineer. DW link technology can still be found on many other bike brands today.

Dorel Industries acquired Iron Horse for US $5.2 million on 15 July 2009, having already acquired GT, Cannondale, Schwinn and Mongoose.
