= Charlie Hatton =

British mountain biker

Personal information
- Born: 23 February 1998 (age 28)

Cycling career
- Sport: Cycling
- Current team: Atherton Continental
- Discipline: Downhill
- Role: Rider
Medal record
Representing Great Britain
Mountain bike racing
World Championships
Gold medal – first place	2023 Glasgow	Men’s downhill

Charlie Hatton (born 23 February 1998) is a British cyclist. In 2023 he became the World Champion in Downhill mountain biking.

== Early life ==
Hatton is from the Forest of Dean and started mountain biking with his older brothers Sam and Joe.

== Career ==
Hatton started on the Atherton Racing program in 2018. In 2021 Hatton competed at the UCI Mountain Bike World Cup for Atherton Bikes. In 2022 he signed a three contract with Continental Atherton. Hatton described signing the contract as a "no-brainer" and he reportedly helped the Atherton siblings, Rachel Atherton and Gee Atherton, develop Atherton Downhill Bikes.

Competing at the UCI Mountain Bike World Championships in Fort William in August 2023, Hatton won the downhill mountain bike gold medal representing Great Britain. Hatton had started the event ranked seventeenth in the world but finished the course in a time of four minutes 26.747 seconds to finish 0.6sec ahead of Andreas Kolb (his Atherton team mate) of Austria with Hatton's compatriot Laurie Greenland winning bronze.

== Recent Results ==
Date	Event	Venue	Category	Position	Beat %	Result
5 August 2023	UCI - DHI World Championships '23	Fort William	Elite	1 / 82	100%	04:26.8
1 July 2023	2023 UCI World Cup DH #3	Val di Sole	Elite (Elites)	DNF / 166	0%	DNF
17 June 2023	2023 UCI World Cup DH #2	Leogang	Elite (Elites)	16 / 181	92%	03:03.4
10 June 2023	2023 UCI World Cup DH #1	Lenzerheide	Elite (Elites)	10 / 198	95%	02:43.1
7 May 2023	2023 British Cycling DH National Series #2	Fort William	Elite	3 / 50	96%	04:30.3
23 April 2023	UCI - 2023 ESO/Discovery DH Test Event	Lourdes	Elite	DNS / 31	0%	DNS
16 April 2023	2023 British Cycling DH National Series #1	Rheola	Elite	2 / 37	97%	02:48.8
2 April 2023	2023 Gravity Events UK DH #1	Rheola	Elite	3 / 16	87%	02:43.8
