= Lapierre Bikes =

French bicycle manufacturer

Cycles Lapierre SAS
- Type: Subsidiary
- Industry: Bicycle industry
- Founded: 1946; 80 years ago
- Founder: Gaston Lapierre
- Headquarters: Dijon, France
- Products: Bicycles
- Parent: Accell
- Website: www.lapierrebikes.com

Cycles Lapierre SAS is a bicycle manufacturing company based in Dijon, France. Lapierre bicycles were previously ridden by French UCI WorldTeams Groupama–FDJ and FDJ Suez, and are ridden by Team Picnic–PostNL (men's team) and Team Picnic–PostNL (women's team) as of 2026. Their mountain bikes have been notably ridden by Nicolas Vouilloz and he has been involved in the development of the bikes.

== History ==
The company was founded in 1946 by Gaston Lapierre in Dijon. His son, Jacky, took over management in 1960, and a new factory was built in 1972.

Lapierre is owned by Accell Group. Accell bought a 33% stake in January 1993, followed by the rest in April 1996.

In 2007 Lapierre started distribution in the United Kingdom. Distribution began in Canada with the 2010 model year.

They now produce over 90,000 bicycles a year at three locations in France.

=== Aircode DRS Lapierre x Alpine ===
In October 2022, French sports car manufacturer Alpine partnered with Lapierre to create a €9,000 limited edition carbon fiber bike.
