= Polygon Bikes =

Indonesian bicycle manufacturer

Coordinates: 7.419807°S 112.729034°E

- Type: Private
- Industry: Bicycle manufacturing
- Founded: 1989; 37 years ago
- Headquarters: Sidoarjo, Indonesia
- Area served: Global
- Products: Bicycles
- Owner: PT Insera Sena
- Website: polygonbikes.com

Polygon Bikes is a brand of bicycles trade name for PT Insera Sena, an Indonesian bicycle manufacturer based in Sidoarjo, East Java. Polygon operates manufacturing facilities in various places in Indonesia. Polygon has an international design team, and commonly used as sponsor and its bike in bicycle competition.

== History ==
Polygon Bikes began building bicycles in 1989 for the Southeast Asian markets. They started manufacturing bicycles with steel and aluminium frames. In 1997, Polygon launched a concept store, Rodalink (Roda Lintas Khatulistiwa), which sells Polygon bikes, parts and accessories. In 2007, Polygon expanded its distribution in Australia. Polygon Bikes expanded to Europe in 2011, settling their headquarters of Europe in Germany. In April 2014, Polygon Bikes expanded again in America.

== Models ==
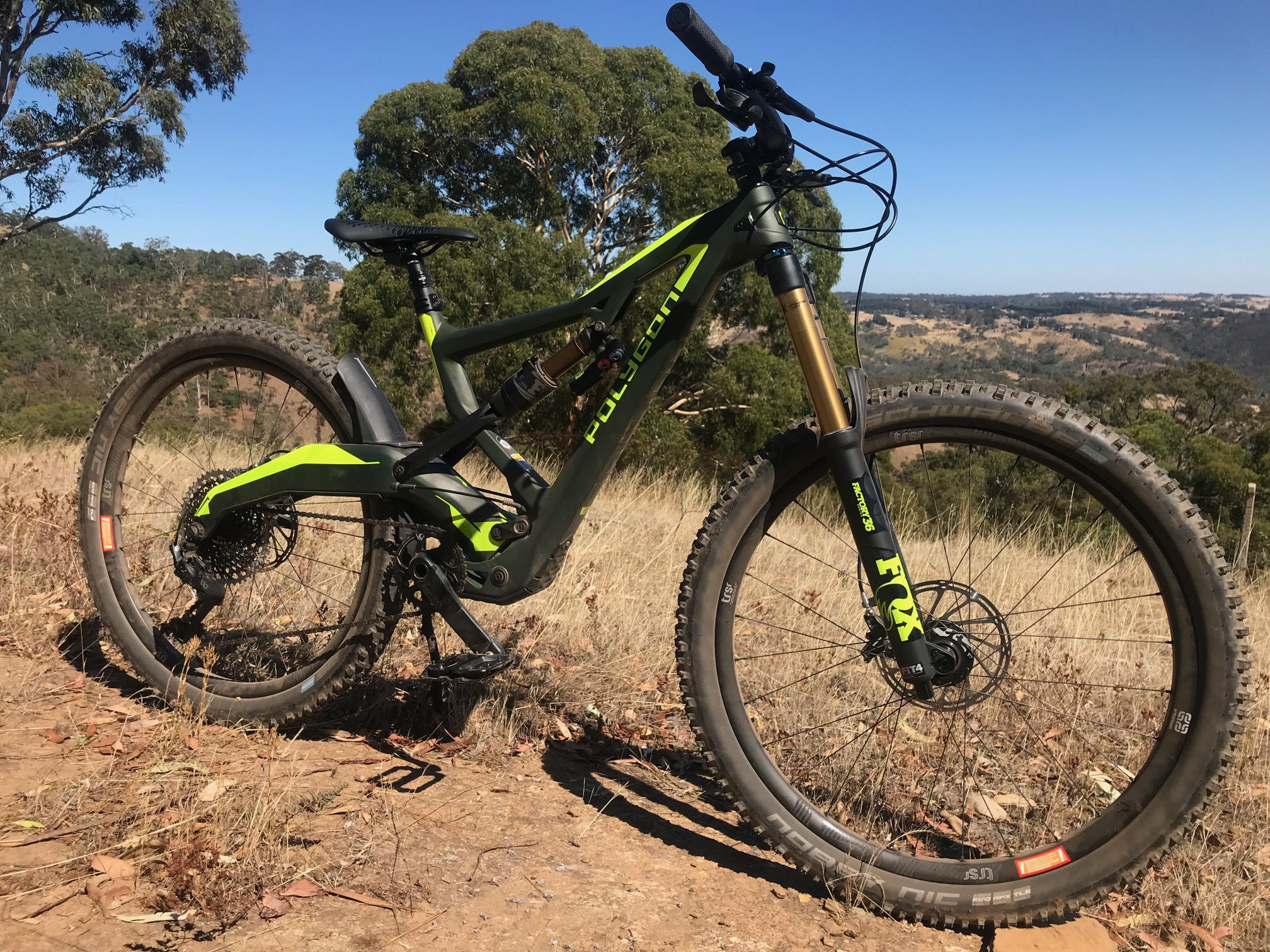
Polygon XQUARONE EX9 (Mountain Bike)

Polygon manufactures a broad range of bicycles that includes Mountain bikes, Road bikes, Urban bikes, E-bikes, BMX bikes and Youth bikes.

=== Mountain Bikes ===
Polygon produces mountain bikes for several categories of use.

Mountain Bike Types: All Mountain, Cross-country (XC), Downhill, Enduro, Freeride, Leisure, Trail, Women's.

=== Road Bikes ===
Polygon road bikes are manufactured in both state-of-the-art composite alloy and carbon frames.

Road Bike Types: Racing, Endurance, Cyclocross, Flat bar road bike.

=== Urban Bikes ===
Polygon Urban models feature aluminum construction.

Urban Bikes Types: Hybrid, Utility, City, Tandem. The Polygon Urbano is a folding bicycle.

=== BMX bikes ===
BMX/ Dirt Jump bikes types: BMX Race, BMX Freestyle, Dirt Jump.

=== Youth Bike ===
Youth Bike Types: Youth Road, Youth Mountain 24", Youth Mountain 20".

== Sponsorship ==
Polygon works with their sponsored athletes in the development process to help them test and provide feedback on designs.

Polygon supports the following Athletes:

1. Enduro: Dan Wolfe
