= Sara Ballantyne (cyclist) =

American mountain biker

Personal information
- Born: October 14, 1960 (age 66)

Cycling career
- Sport: Cycling
- Discipline: Mountain bike
- Role: Rider
- Rider type: Cross-country
Medal record
Women's mountain bike racing
Representing United States
World Championships
Silver medal – second place	1990 Durango	Cross-country
Bronze medal – third place	1994 Vail	Cross-country

Sara Ballantyne (born October 14, 1960) is an American former professional cross-country mountain biker. See most notably finished second at the 1990 UCI Cross-country World Championships. She also won the 1991 UCI XCO World Cup and the 1989 national XCO championships.

She was inducted into the Mountain Bike Hall of Fame in 1992 and the United States Bicycling Hall of Fame in 2014.

== Personal life ==
After retiring from cycling, she operated a massage studio in Colorado.

== Major results ==
1987
1st World Cross-country Championships
2nd National XCO Championships
1988
1st World Cross-country Championships
1989
1st World Cross-country Championships
1st National XCO Championships
1990
2nd UCI World XCO Championships
1991
1st Overall UCI XCO World Cup

1st Mont-Sainte-Anne

1994
3rd UCI World XCO Championships
