= Nicolas Vouilloz =

French mountain biker and rally driver (born 1976)

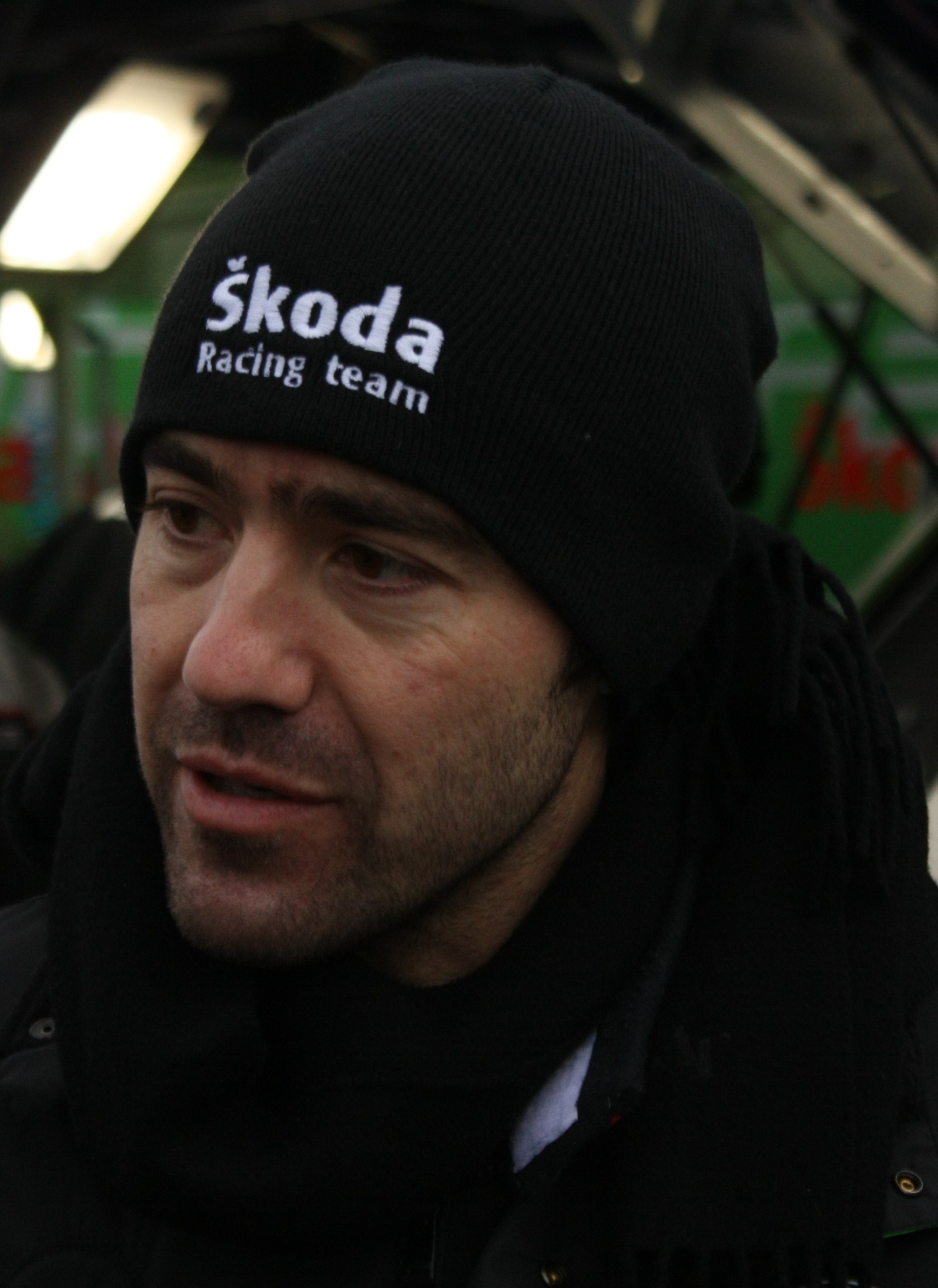
- Vouilloz at the 2011 Monte Carlo Rally

Personal information
- Born: 8 February 1976 (age 50) Nice, France

Cycling career
- Sport: Cycling
- Discipline: Mountain biking
- Role: Rider
Medal record
Representing France
Men's mountain bike racing
World Championships
Gold medal – first place	1992 Bromont	Junior downhill
Gold medal – first place	1993 Métabief	Junior downhill
Gold medal – first place	1994 Vail	Junior downhill
Gold medal – first place	1995 Kirchzarten	Downhill
Gold medal – first place	1996 Cairns	Downhill
Gold medal – first place	1997 Château-d'Œx	Downhill
Gold medal – first place	1998 Mont Sainte-Anne	Downhill
Gold medal – first place	1999 Åre	Downhill
Gold medal – first place	2001 Vail	Downhill
Gold medal – first place	2002 Kaprun	Downhill

Nicolas Vouilloz (born 8 February 1976) is a French professional mountain biker and former professional rally driver.

== Biography ==
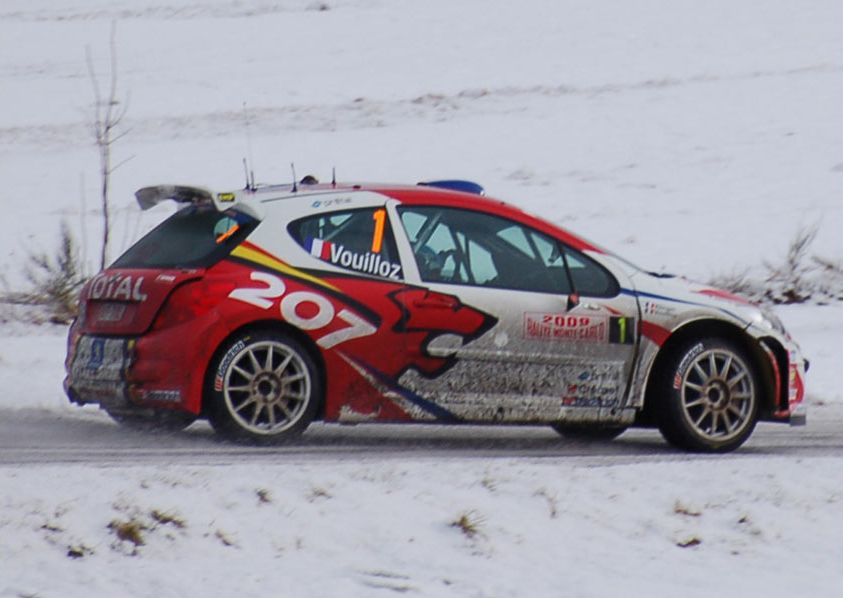
Vouilloz at the 2009 Monte Carlo Rally

Vouilloz won the Downhill Mountain Bike World Championships ten times, starting as a junior in 1992 and finishing his career with his tenth victory in 2002, only placing lower in 2000 finishing eighth. He also won sixteen World cup Downhill races and is widely considered as the greatest male downhill racer of all time.

Vouilloz was born in Nice, France. In 2000, he started rallying in local and then national rally series. He debuted in the World Rally Championship at the 2001 Monte Carlo Rally. His best result in the WRC is ninth place at the 2004 Wales Rally GB, driving a Peugeot 206 WRC for the Bozian Racing team. Being a Peugeot protégé and development driver, Peugeot Sport paired Vouilloz with experienced codriver Denis Giraudet (winner of the 1994 WRC title with countryman Didier Auriol).

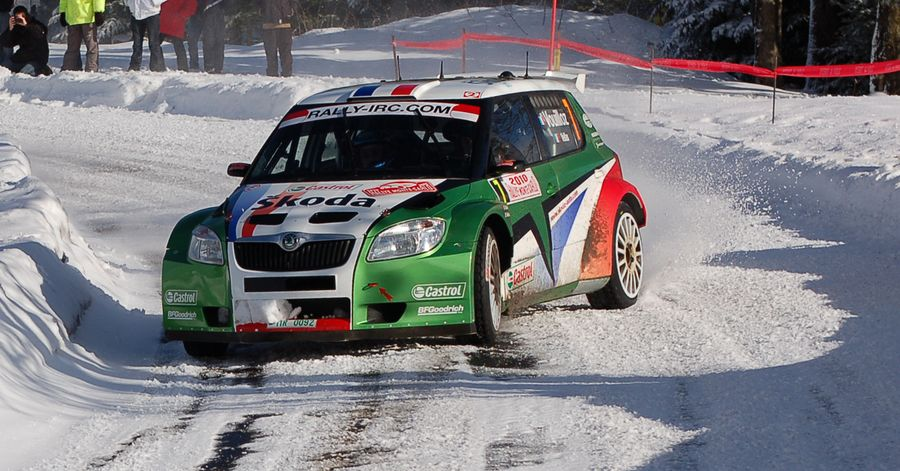
Vouilloz at the 2010 Monte Carlo Rally

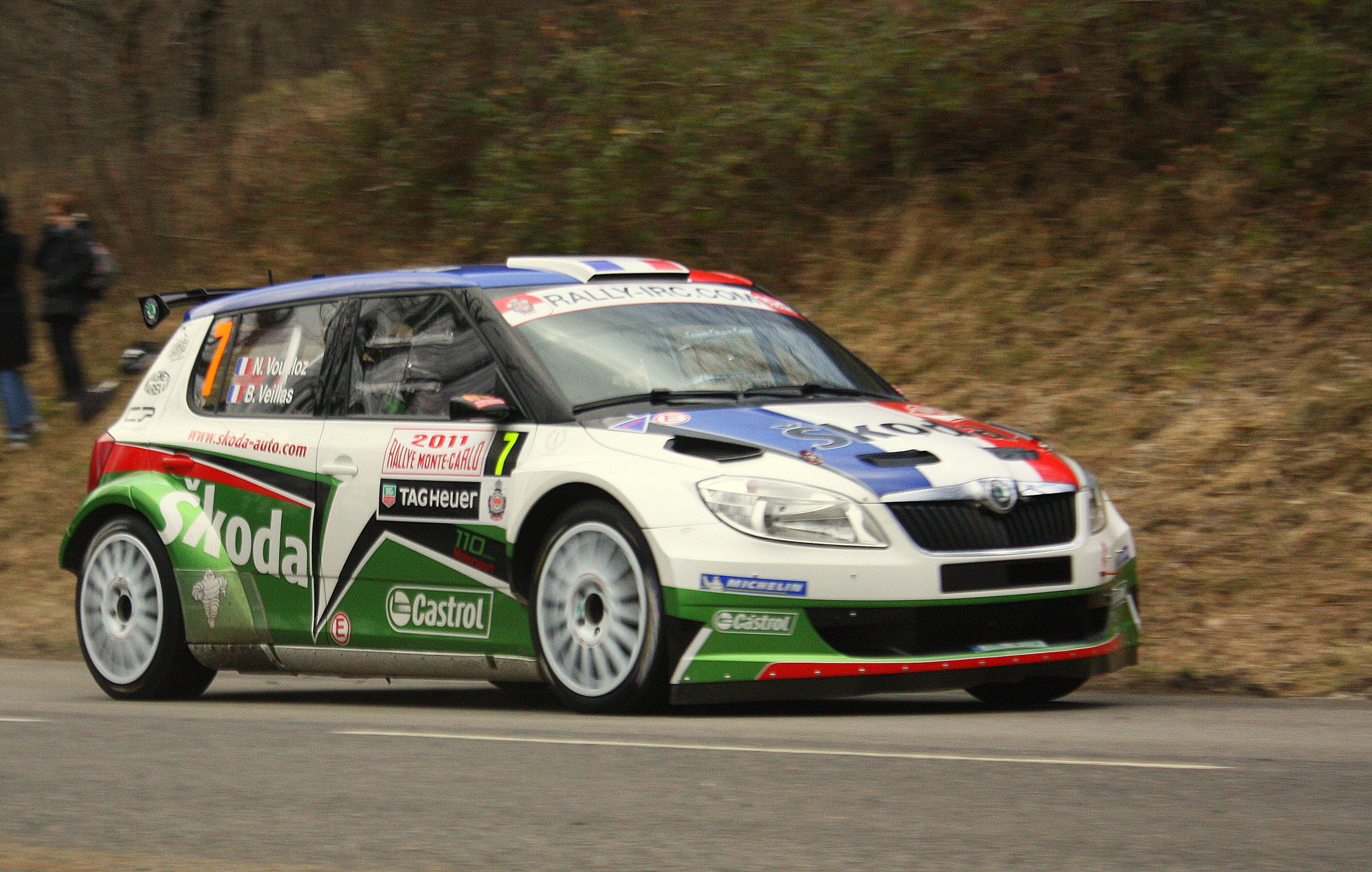
Vouilloz at the 2011 Monte Carlo Rally

Following Peugeot's decision to pull out of the WRC, Vouilloz competed on a full-time basis in the Intercontinental Rally Challenge from 2007 to 2009. He was runner-up in 2007 with three wins. In 2008, he won the championship in a Peugeot 207 S2000, ahead of Belgian teammate Freddy Loix, with one win, six second-place finishes and top-five finishes in each race. In 2009, he finished fourth with the same car, collecting three podiums but no wins.

After several years absence from the mountain biking scene, Vouilloz returned to race professionally in 2007 at the fourth round of the World Cup in Champery, Switzerland. He races for Lapierre Ultimate Cycles and is currently involved in the Enduro World Series.

== Complete World Rally Championship results ==
Year	Entrant	Car	1	2	3	4	5	6	7	8	9	10	11	12	13	14	15	16	WDC	Points
2001	Nicolas Vouilloz	Renault Clio RS	MON	SWE	POR	ESP	ARG	CYP	GRE	KEN	FIN	NZL	ITA	FRA; Ret	AUS	GBR			NC	0
2004	Bozian Racing	Peugeot 206 WRC	MON; Ret	SWE	MEX	NZL	CYP	GRE; Ret	TUR	ARG	FIN	GER; 12	JPN	GBR; 9	ITA; Ret	FRA; Ret	ESP; 10	AUS	NC	0
2005	Nicolas Vouilloz	Škoda Fabia WRC	MON	SWE	MEX	NZL	ITA	CYP	TUR	GRE	ARG	FIN	GER	GBR	JPN	FRA; 11	ESP; Ret	AUS	NC	0
2006	Equipe de France FFSA	Peugeot 307 WRC	MON	SWE	MEX	ESP	FRA; Ret	ARG	ITA	GRE	GER	FIN	JPN	CYP	TUR	AUS	NZL	GBR	NC	0

== IRC results ==
Year	Entrant	Car	1	2	3	4	5	6	7	8	9	10	11	12	WDC	Points
2007	Peugeot Sport España	Peugeot 207 S2000	KEN	TUR; 1	BEL; Ret	RUS; 3	POR; 9	CZE; 1	ITA; 3	SWI; 1	CHI				2nd	42
2008	Peugeot Team Bel-Lux	Peugeot 207 S2000	TUR; 2	POR; 3	BEL; 2	RUS; 5	POR; 1	CZE; 2	ESP; 2	ITA; 2	SWI; 2	CHI			1st	68
2009	Peugeot Team Bel-Lux	Peugeot 207 S2000	MON; Ret	BRA; 2	KEN	POR; 3	BEL; Ret	RUS	POR; 4	CZE; Ret	ESP; 3	ITA; 3	SCO		4th	31
2010	Škoda Motorsport	Škoda Fabia S2000	MON; 3	BRA	ARG	CAN	ITA	BEL	AZO	MAD	CZE	ITA	SCO	CYP	15th	6
2011	Škoda Motorsport	Škoda Fabia S2000	MON; 7	CAN	FRA	UKR	BEL	AZO	MAD	CZE	HUN	ITA	SCO	CYP	14th	6

== Palmarès ==
- World Cup Downhill Champion : 1995, 1996, 1998, 1999, 2000
- Downhill World Champion : 1995, 1996, 1997, 1998, 1999, 2001, 2002
- Downhill Junior World Champion : 1992, 1993, 1994

Sporting positions
Preceded by Enrique García-Ojeda	Intercontinental Rally Challenge Champion; 2008	Succeeded by Kris Meeke
