= John Tomac =

Croatian American professional cyclist (born 1967)

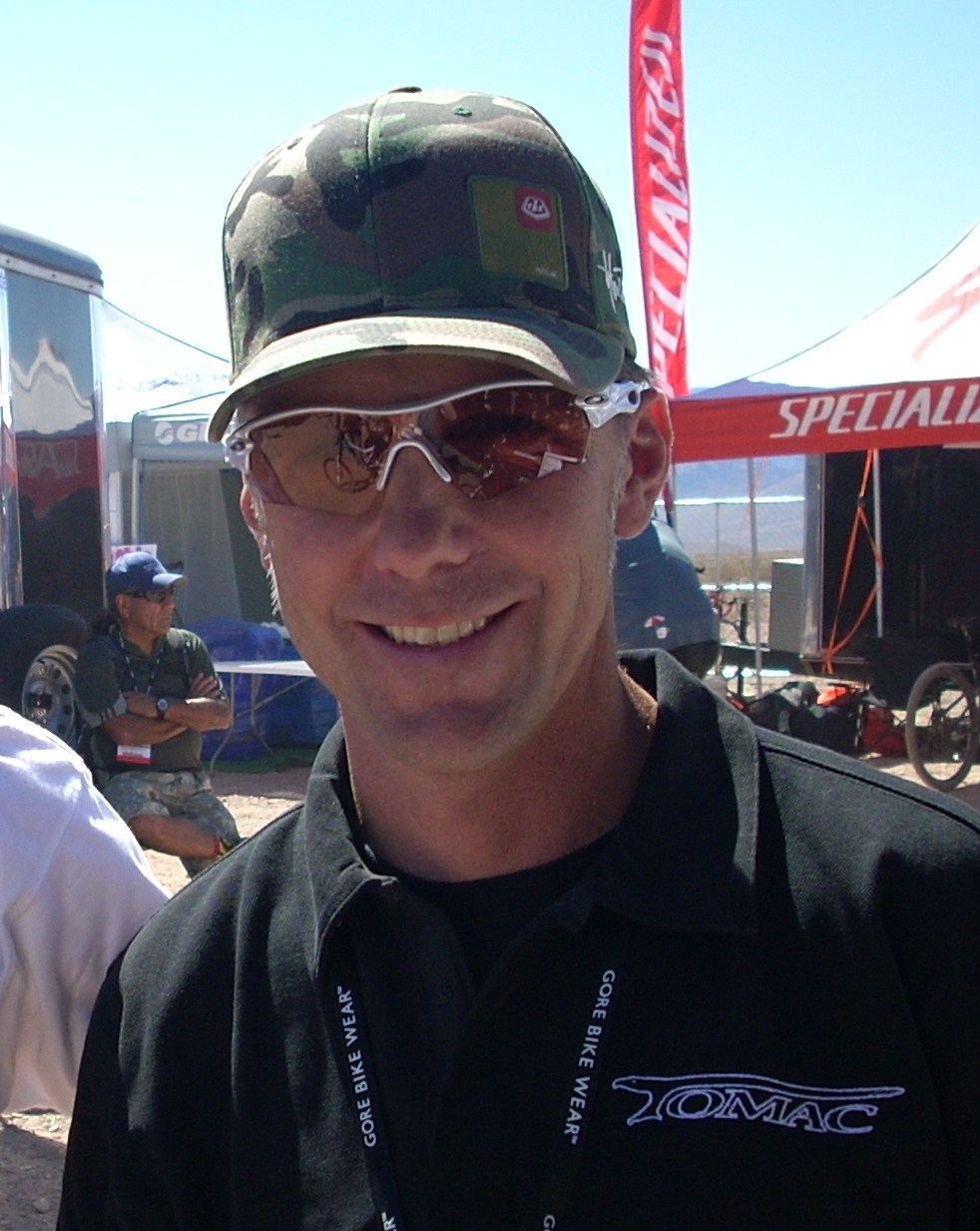

Personal information
- Full name: John Tomac
- Nicknames: "Johnny T", "Farmer John" "Tomac Attack"
- Born: November 3, 1967 (age 59) Owosso, Michigan, United States
- Height: 5 ft 10 in (1.78 m)
- Weight: 175 lb (79 kg)

Cycling career
- Sport: Cycling
- Current team: Retired
- Disciplines: BMX, MTB, Road
- Role: Rider/Manufacturer

Professional teams
- 1985–1989: Mongoose
- 1990–1991: Yeti Cycles (MTB)
- 1989–1991: 7-11 Pro team (Road)
- 1991: Motorola (Road)
- 1991–1994: Tioga/Raleigh Cycles (MTB)
- 1995-1998: Giant Bicycles/Answer Manitou (MTB)
- 1998–2005: Tomac Racing (MTB)

Managerial team
- 1998 onwards: Tomac Racing (MTB)
Medal record
Men's mountain bike racing
Representing United States
World Championships
Gold medal – first place	1991 Ciocco	Cross Country
Silver medal – second place	1991 Ciocco	Downhill
Silver medal – second place	1997 Château-d'Œx	Downhill

John Tomac (born November 3, 1967, in Owosso, Michigan) is an American former professional cyclist who competed from 1985 to 2005. He is of Croatian ancestry. He was a versatile rider who competed in multiple disciplines, including BMX racing, cross-country, road racing, trials riding, and downhill racing. Tomac became a mountain bike racing icon in the late 1980s as the sport began to develop beyond its formative years. At the time of his retirement in 2005, he had won more mountain bike races than anyone in the sport. In 1991, he was inducted into the Mountain Bike Hall of Fame, and in 2004 he was inducted into the United States Bicycling Hall of Fame.

== Early career ==
Tomac first participated in cycle racing at the age of seven. He began to compete in BMX racing events in and around Michigan in 1975 and continued competing in this discipline into his teenage years, racing against Michigan BMX legends Tony Carnes, Mike Chapman, and Tim Root. In 1984, at age 16, Tomac won the National Cruiser Class title with the factory Mongoose team. He turned professional in 1985 and spent his last year of BMX competition contesting events as a privateer.

== Mountain biking ==
In 1986, Tomac made two significant decisions: he relocated to Southern California, and he left BMX competition for mountain bike racing. He continued to ride for Mongoose. By the autumn of that year, he had won his first two major mountain bike events: the Ross Fat Tire Stage Race in Massachusetts and the Supercross Mountain Bike Exhibition race held at the Los Angeles Memorial Coliseum. Mongoose marketed a Tomac Signature Edition model in 1987, which reflected his rising profile within mountain biking culture. Tomac achieved a few more notable wins during that year, including a second win in the Fat Tire Stage Race and three National XC Series rounds.

In 1987, John Tomac appeared in one of the first instructional mountain biking videos ever produced, entitled The Great Mountain Biking Video, produced by New & Unique Videos of San Diego, California.

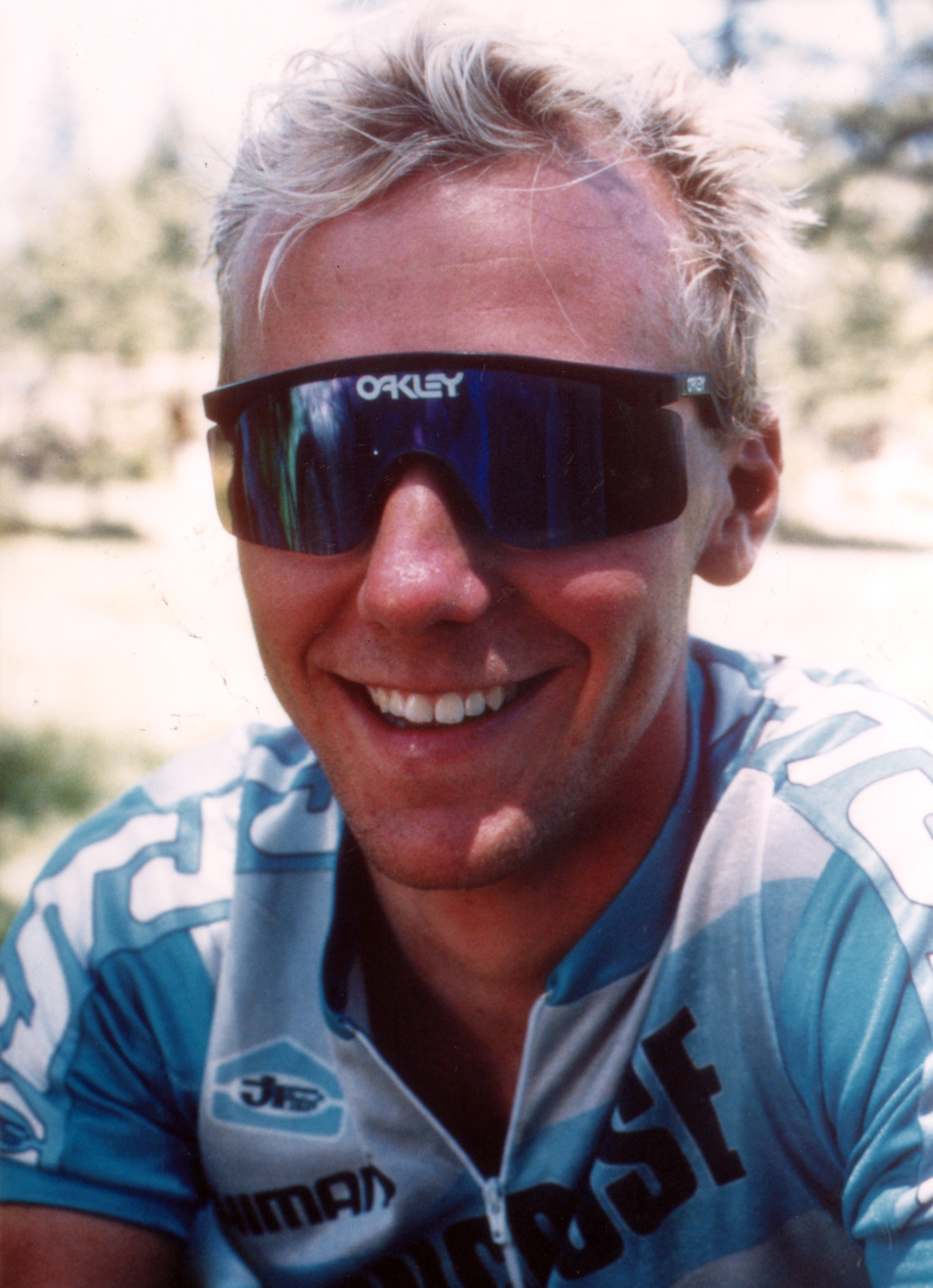
John Tomac Appears in "The Great Mountain Biking Video" 1987, Big Bear Lakes, California - Photo by Patty Mooney

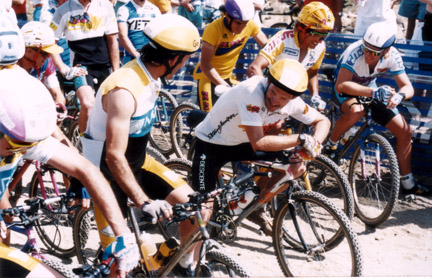
Ned Overend, John Tomac and Tinker Juarez Compete in the Cindy Whitehead Desert Classic, Palm Springs, California, 1989 - Photo by Patty Mooney

The following year, 1988 brought Tomac national title-winning success. By achieving the highest combined points total in the National Off-Road Bicycle Association's (NORBA) Cross-country, Downhill, and Dual Slalom championships, Tomac won the overall title of NORBA World Champion. He was ranked first place in the Cross-country and Dual Slalom disciplines. The "World" status was a misnomer, however, as the NORBA championships were held only in the United States. The first true World Championships for XC and DH, sanctioned by the Union Cycliste Internationale, were held in Durango, Colorado, in 1990, where Tomac placed fourth in the downhill. He is well remembered for riding road-style drop handlebars on his Yeti mountain bike at this race, a noticeable deviation from the other riders. This equipment decision was influenced by his recent experience riding for the 7-11 road cycling team in Europe, where he was under contract. Tomac's results and rapid rise to prominence earned recognition from US cycling magazine Velo News, which voted him the world's best all-round rider of 1988.

Tomac retained his overall NORBA title in 1989 and also won the NORBA DH Championship for the first time. In a season in which he competed at the highest level on both sides of the Atlantic, he added the German and European XC titles to his collection. In 1990, he joined Yeti Cycles' factory MTB team and the 7-11 road team, embarking on a busy program of events in Europe and the US. To facilitate his road racing career, Tomac based himself in Belgium, and he regularly traveled between the two continents to compete in major road and mountain events. Although he failed to win any of the three individual NORBA series, he won the overall NORBA title for the third successive year.

The following year, 1991, saw a change of teams: from Yeti to Raleigh and from 7-11 to Motorola. A stronger mountain bike season culminated in UCI World Championship success in Ciocco, Italy, with Gold in XC and Silver in DH. In addition, Tomac won two events on his way to the UCI XC World Cup title and added a second NORBA DH title to his 1989 win. The following year, he finished fifth at the DH World Championship held in Bromont, Canada, and had to settle for second place behind Switzerland's Thomas Frischknecht in the XC World Cup rankings (though there were two event wins again). An accident in which Tomac struck an errant spectator in the final event at Mount Snow, Vermont, prevented him from outscoring his rival and retaining the title.

In 1993, Tomac was the runner-up to Germany's Jürgen Beneke in the inaugural UCI Downhill World Cup and lost out to Frischknecht again in the XC rankings. This was to be the last season in which Tomac would finish in the top three in the World Cup, but he continued to achieve notable results in the World Championships. In 1997, five years after his last World Championship medal, he finished second in the downhill event at Château-d'Oex in Switzerland.

Between 1994 and 1997, Tomac won three more NORBA titles—two in DH and one in XC—as well as some notable individual events, such as the Sea Otter Classic and Cactus Cup. He officially announced his retirement from racing at the Sea Otter Classic in 2000, but later made an occasional return to competition. In 2004, at age 37, he won the famous Kamikaze Downhill held at Mammoth Mountain, California. Then, for good measure, he returned in 2005 and won it again.

Major MTB results by year
1988	NORBA Overall Champion; NORBA National XC Champion; NORBA National Dual Slalom Champion
1989	NORBA Overall Champion; NORBA National Dual Slalom Champion; German XC Champion; European XC Champion
1990	NORBA Overall Champion
1991	Gold medal - XC World Championship; Silver medal - DH World Championship; XC World Cup champion NORBA National DH Champion
1992	Second place in XC World Cup
1993	Second place in XC World Cup; Second place in DH World Cup
1994	NORBA National DH Champion; Cactus Cup winner Sea Otter Stage winner
1996	NORBA National XC Champion
1997	Silver medal - DH World Championship
2004	Mammoth Kamikaze winner
2005	Mammoth Kamikaze winner

== Road racing ==
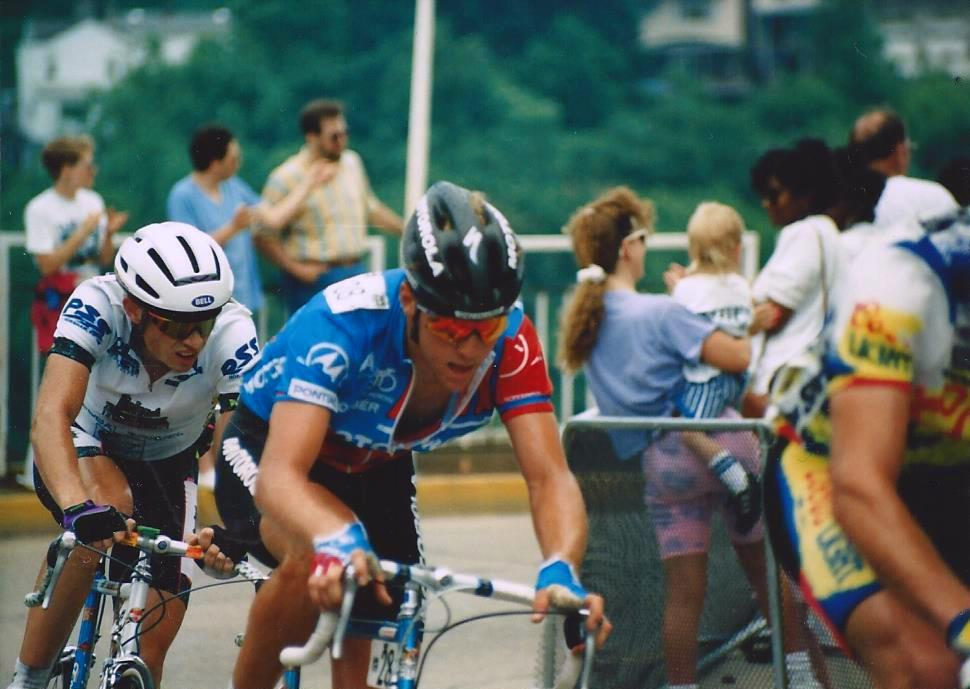
Tomac racing for Motorola in 1991

From 1988 to 1991, Tomac dovetailed professional programs in both mountain biking and road racing. He was the 1988 USCF National Criterium Champion and was part of the winning team in the USCF National Team Time Trial Championship in 1989. Tomac spent much of 1990 competing in European events with the Motorola team. Although he failed to win any major road titles in a season in which he entered more than 100 road and mountain events, his schedule included the Tour of Flanders, the Giro d'Italia, and Paris–Roubaix. Tomac ended his participation in pro-level road racing at the close of the 1991 season, choosing instead to focus on his mountain biking career.

Major road results by year
1988	USCF National Criterium Champion
1989	USCF National Team Time Trial Champion
1991	2nd, Thrift Drug Classic

== Team ownership ==
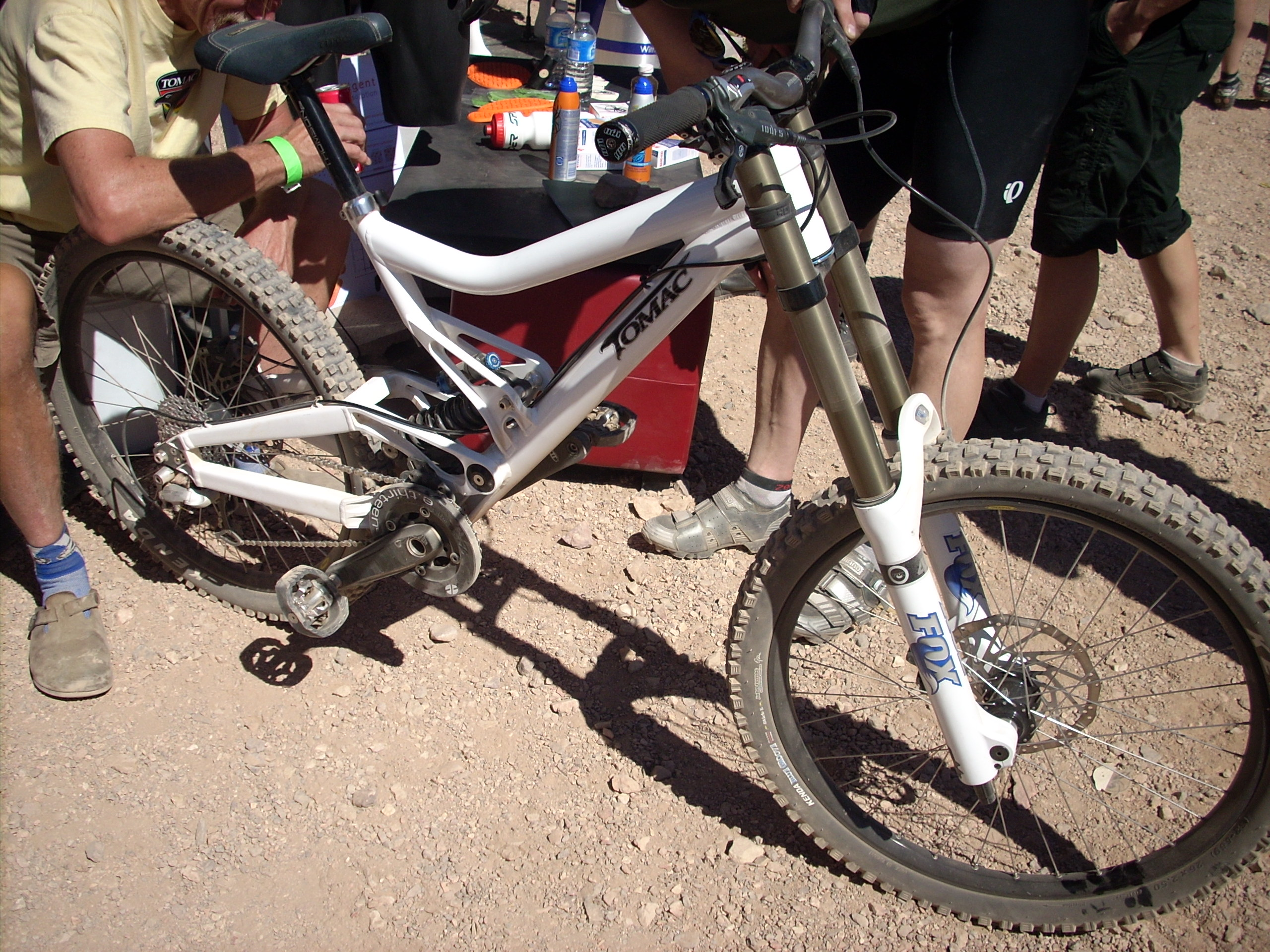
2008 Tomac DH bike. Doug Bradbury sitting in the upper left corner.

In January 1998, John Tomac entered into a business partnership with Manitou founder and suspension engineer Doug Bradbury, whom he had known since the 1980s. Together, they founded Tomac Bicycles, which launched a range of three full suspension bikes later that year. Tomac spent the 1998 season competing on his new prototype design in DH events.

The brand name was later acquired by American Bicycle Group, which in turn sold it to Joel Smith, formerly a brand manager at Answer Products, in June 2006. Smith relocated the company to Nebraska and set in place plans to relaunch the Tomac brand with a new model range in 2007. Tomac remains actively involved in the company and the design of its products.

== Family ==
Tomac's son, Eli Tomac, is a professional motocross racer competing in the AMA motocross and supercross national championships, riding for Red Bull KTM] racing team. Eli Tomac is noted for being the first true rookie pro ever to win his professional motocross debut, at the Hangtown raceway on May 23, 2010, winning the 2012 West Region, the 2013 250cc, and the 2017, 2018, 2019, and 2022 450cc Motocross National Championships along with the 2020 450cc and 2022 450cc Supercross Championships.

== Primary sources ==
- John Tomac's History tomac.com
- MTB Hall of Fame mtnbikehalloffame.com
