= 2017 UCI Mountain Bike World Championships =

- Venue: Val di Sole, Italy; Cairns, Australia
- Dates: 24–25 August 2017 (Val di Sole); 5–10 September 2017 (Cairns)
- Events: 13

The 2017 UCI Mountain Bike World Championships was the 28th edition of the UCI Mountain Bike World Championships. As in 2016, the championships in the various disciplines were held at separate events. The world championships in four-cross were held at Val di Sole, Italy, on 24 and 25 August 2017, alongside UCI World Cup events in cross-country and downhill. The world championships in cross-country and downhill were held in Cairns, Australia, from 5 to 10 September 2017.

The UCI world championships in trials, which had been held alongside the UCI Mountain Bike World Championships since 2000, were run as part of the newly created UCI Urban Cycling World Championships in 2017. The Urban Cycling World Championships also included the UCI world championships in cross-country eliminator, which had been part of the UCI Mountain Bike World Championships since 2012, and in BMX freestyle.

The Cairns event marked the second time the UCI Mountain Bike World Championships had been held in Cairns and the third time the event was held in Australia, following the 1996 edition in Cairns and the 2009 edition in Canberra. This was the third consecutive year that the UCI World Championships in four-cross were held in Val di Sole.

== Medal summary ==
=== Men's events ===
Event	Gold	Silver	Bronze
Cross-country	Nino Schurter; Switzerland	Jaroslav Kulhavý; Czech Republic	Thomas Litscher; Switzerland
Under 23 cross-country	Sam Gaze; New Zealand	Alan Hatherly; South Africa	Maximilian Brandl; Germany
Junior cross-country	Cameron Wright; Australia	Joel Roth; Switzerland	Holden Jones; Canada
Downhill	Loïc Bruni; France	Michael Hannah; Australia	Aaron Gwin; United States
Junior downhill	Matt Walker; Great Britain	Joe Breeden; Great Britain	Max Hartenstein; Germany
Four-cross	Felix Beckerman; Sweden	Quentin Derbier; France	Giovanni Pozzoni; Italy

=== Women's events ===
Event	Gold	Silver	Bronze
Cross-country	Jolanda Neff; Switzerland	Annie Last; Great Britain	Pauline Ferrand-Prévot; France
Under 23 cross-country	Sina Frei; Switzerland	Kate Courtney; United States	Alessandra Keller; Switzerland
Junior cross-country	Laura Stigger; Austria	Loana Lecomte; France	Nadia Grod; Switzerland
Downhill	Miranda Miller; Canada	Myriam Nicole; France	Tracey Hannah; Australia
Junior downhill	Mélanie Chappaz; France	Shania Rawson; New Zealand	Flora Lesoin; France
Four-cross	Caroline Buchanan; Australia	Romana Labounková; Czech Republic	Helene Valerie Fruhwirth; Austria

=== Team events ===
Event	Gold	Silver	Bronze
Cross-country	Switzerland; Filippo Colombo; Joel Roth; Sina Frei; Jolanda Neff; Nino Schurter	Denmark; Sebastian Fini Carstensen; Alexander Young Andersen; Annika Langvad; Malene Degn; Simon Andreassen	France; Jordan Sarrou; Mathis Azzaro; Pauline Ferrand-Prévot; Lena Gerault; Neilo Perrin Ganier

== Medal table ==
Rank	Nation	Gold	Silver	Bronze	Total
1	Switzerland	4	1	3	8
2	France	2	3	3	8
3	Australia	2	1	1	4
4	Great Britain	1	2	0	3
5	New Zealand	1	1	0	2
6	Austria	1	0	1	2
6	Canada	1	0	1	2
8	Sweden	1	0	0	1
9	Czech Republic	0	2	0	2
10	United States	0	1	1	2
11	Denmark	0	1	0	1
11	South Africa	0	1	0	1
13	Germany	0	0	2	2
14	Italy	0	0	1	1
Total		13	13	13	39

== See also ==
- 2017 UCI Mountain Bike World Cup
