= Matti Lehikoinen =

Finnish downhill cyclist

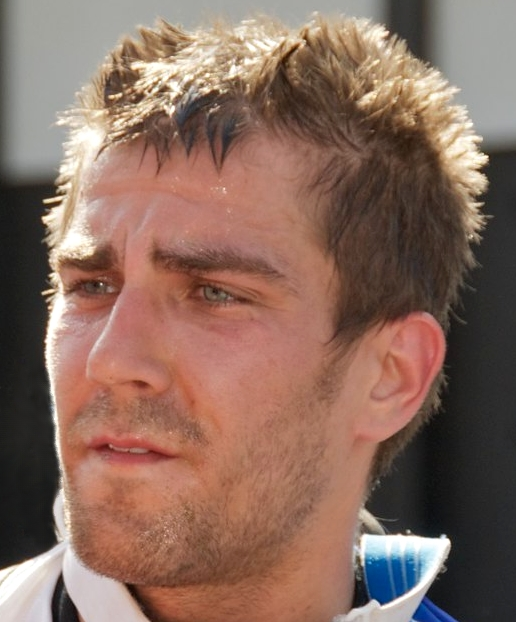
- Matti Lehikoinen, 2010

Personal information
- Born: 19 April 1984 (age 42)

Cycling career
- Sport: Cycling
- Discipline: Downhill cycling
- Role: Rider

Professional teams
- ?-2002: Arai/Global Racing
- 2002-2008/9: Honda G Cross
- 2009: Evil Bikes

Matti Lehikoinen (born 19 April 1984) is Finland's leading downhill cyclist. His previous achievements include 2001 junior European championship from Italy's Livigno and top-ten placings in the downhill World Cup during 2002–2004. After having ridden a few years in Team Arai/Global Racing, he joined Team Honda G Cross in 2005.

== Career ==
His teammates on Team Honda G Cross included South Africa's Greg Minnaar who had been Lehikoinen's teammate since 2001. During the 2006 season Lehikoinen made Finnish cycling history as being the first Finnish mountain biker to win a Mountain Bike World Cup event. The event took place in Balneario Cambrio in Brazil. Lehikoinen placed 6th in the overall rankings of the 2006 Downhill World Cup.

Lehikoinen also won the most difficult track of the 2007 World Cup in Champéry and placed 2nd overall in the 2007 Downhill World Cup. After the season Lehikoinen signed a deal with MS-Intense Racing, to become the leading rider of the team replacing Chris Kovarik. Soon after that he suffered a serious crash while training and fractured several vertebrae.

By season 2008 he is fully recovered and placed 9th in the World Cup race in Vallnord, Andorra.

He recently crashed at the sixth World Cup race in Canberra, Australia. In this terrible crash, he broke both of his wrists and resulted in some very complicated fractures. A 6-hour operation was followed and a total of 12 screws, 3 metal plates, 3 pins were placed. Lehikoinen rehabilitated at the Red Bull training center in Austria and said to have 50% of his wrists movement back.

Lehikoinen has now fully recovered and was offered a deal from Evil Bikes for the 2009 WC downhill season.

During a World Cup Finals in Bromont, the 7th race of the season, Lehikoinen crashed on the sequence of drops resulting in a fractured collarbone and pelvis. He aims to be back for the final World Cup event of 2009, Schladming, but will more than likely have to pull out of the World Championships in Canberra.

Following a full recovery from his injuries, for the 2010 season Lehikoinen signed a deal with ex-teammate current team Chain Reaction Cycles / Intense Cycles Chris Kovarik. He was placed in 5th position in a Mega Avalanche downhill event. In this new test of his riding skills he was awarded a funded place in the next event of this kind.

== See also ==
- Honda RN-01 G-cross, unique mountain bike used by Lehikoinen's former team
- Greg Minnaar, Lehikoinen's previous teammate
- Chris Kovarik, Lehikoinen's current teammate
