= Dave Cullinan =

American mountain biker

Personal information
- Born: May 8, 1968 (age 58) Durango, Colorado

Cycling career
- Sport: Cycling
- Discipline: Downhill
- Role: Rider

Professional teams
- 1993: Iron Horse
- 1994: Diamond Back Racing
- 1997: KHS Bicycles
- 1997: Schwinn Oakley
- 1998-2000: Schwinn Toyota
Medal record
Representing United States
Mountain bike racing
World Championships
Gold medal – first place	1992 Bromont	Downhill

Dave Cullinan (born May 8, 1968) is an American former BMX racer and professional mountain bike downhill and dual slalom athlete. He is the winner of the 1992 UCI Downhill Mountain Bike World Championships.
