= Eva Orvošová =

Slovak cyclist

Personal information
- Full name: Eva Loweová-Orvošová
- Born: 18 January 1971 (age 55) Liptovský Mikuláš, Czechoslovakia
- Height: 168 cm (5 ft 6 in)
- Weight: 56 kg (123 lb)

Cycling career
- Sport: Cycling
- Disciplines: Road cycling, Mountain biking

Eva Loweová-Orvošová (born 18 January 1971) is a mountain bike rider and road cyclist from Slovakia. She represented her nation at the 1996 Summer Olympics on the road in the women's road race and on the mountain bike in the women's cross-country.
