= Silvia Fürst =

Swiss cyclist

Personal information
- Born: 8 May 1961 (age 65) Bern, Switzerland

Cycling career
- Sport: Cycling

Silvia Fürst (born 8 May 1961) is a Swiss former cyclist. She competed in the women's cross-country mountain biking event at the 1996 Summer Olympics.
