= UCI Mountain Bike World Championships – Men's cross-country =

The men's cross-country is an event at the annual UCI Mountain Bike & Trials World Championships. It has been held since the inaugural world championships in 1990. As of September 2022, Nino Schurter of Switzerland is the most successful rider in the event with ten world titles.

== Medalists ==
Championships	Gold	Silver	Bronze
1990 Durango	Ned Overend; United States	Thomas Frischknecht; Switzerland	Tim Gould; Great Britain
1991 Ciocco	John Tomac; United States	Thomas Frischknecht; Switzerland	Ned Overend; United States
1992 Bromont	Henrik Djernis; Denmark	Thomas Frischknecht; Switzerland	David Baker; Great Britain
1993 Métabief	Henrik Djernis; Denmark	Marcel Gerritsen; Netherlands	Jan Erik Østergaard; Denmark
1994 Vail	Henrik Djernis; Denmark	Tinker Juarez; United States	Bart Brentjens; Netherlands
1995 Kirchzarten	Bart Brentjens; Netherlands	Miguel Martinez; France	Jan Erik Østergaard; Denmark
1996 Cairns	Thomas Frischknecht; Switzerland	Rune Høydahl; Norway	Hubert Pallhuber; Italy
1997 Château-d'Œx	Hubert Pallhuber; Italy	Henrik Djernis; Denmark	Luca Bramati; Italy
1998 Mont Sainte-Anne	Christophe Dupouey; France	Jerome Chiotti; France	Filip Meirhaeghe; Belgium
1999 Åre	Michael Rasmussen; Denmark	Miguel Martinez; France	Filip Meirhaeghe; Belgium
2000 Sierra Nevada	Miguel Martinez; France	Roland Green; Canada	Bart Brentjens; Netherlands
2001 Vail	Roland Green; Canada	Thomas Frischknecht; Switzerland	Christoph Sauser; Switzerland
2002 Kaprun	Roland Green; Canada	Filip Meirhaeghe; Belgium	Thomas Frischknecht; Switzerland
2003 Lugano	Filip Meirhaeghe; Belgium	Ryder Hesjedal; Canada	Roel Paulissen; Belgium
2004 Les Gets	Julien Absalon; France	Cédric Ravanel; France	Thomas Frischknecht; Switzerland
2005 Livigno	Julien Absalon; France	Christoph Sauser; Switzerland	José Antonio Hermida; Spain
2006 Rotorua	Julien Absalon; France	Christoph Sauser; Switzerland	Fredrik Kessiakoff; Sweden
2007 Fort William	Julien Absalon; France	Ralph Näf; Switzerland	Florian Vogel; Switzerland
2008 Val di Sole	Christoph Sauser; Switzerland	Florian Vogel; Switzerland	Ralph Näf; Switzerland
2009 Canberra	Nino Schurter; Switzerland	Julien Absalon; France	Florian Vogel; Switzerland
2010 Mont Sainte-Anne	José Antonio Hermida; Spain	Jaroslav Kulhavý; Czech Republic	Burry Stander; South Africa
2011 Champery	Jaroslav Kulhavý; Czech Republic	Nino Schurter; Switzerland	Julien Absalon; France
2012 Leogang-Saalfelden	Nino Schurter; Switzerland	Lukas Flückiger; Switzerland	Mathias Flückiger; Switzerland
2013 Pietermaritzburg	Nino Schurter; Switzerland	Manuel Fumic; Germany	José Antonio Hermida; Spain
2014 Lillehammer/Hafjell	Julien Absalon; France	Nino Schurter; Switzerland	Marco Aurelio Fontana; Italy
2015 Vallnord	Nino Schurter; Switzerland	Julien Absalon; France	Ondřej Cink; Czech Republic
2016 Nové Město	Nino Schurter; Switzerland	Jaroslav Kulhavý; Czech Republic	Julien Absalon; France
2017 Cairns	Nino Schurter; Switzerland	Jaroslav Kulhavý; Czech Republic	Thomas Litscher; Switzerland
2018 Lenzerheide	Nino Schurter; Switzerland	Gerhard Kerschbaumer; Italy	Mathieu van der Poel; Netherlands
2019 Mont Sainte-Anne	Nino Schurter; Switzerland	Mathias Flückiger; Switzerland	Stéphane Tempier; France
2020 Leogang	Jordan Sarrou; France	Mathias Flückiger; Switzerland	Titouan Carod; France
2021 Val di Sole	Nino Schurter; Switzerland	Mathias Flückiger; Switzerland	Victor Koretzky; France
2022 Les Gets	Nino Schurter; Switzerland	David Valero; Spain	Luca Braidot; Italy
2023 Glasgow	Tom Pidcock; Great Britain	Sam Gaze; New Zealand	Nino Schurter; Switzerland
2024 Pal–Arinsal	Alan Hatherly; South Africa	Victor Koretzky; France	Tom Pidcock; Great Britain
2025 Valais	Alan Hatherly; South Africa	Simone Avondetto; Italy	Victor Koretzky; France
2026 Val di Sole	Tom Pidcock; Great Britain	Charlie Aldridge; Great Britain	Cole Punchard; Canada

== Medal table ==
Rank	Nation	Gold	Silver	Bronze	Total
1	Switzerland	12	14	9	35
2	France	8	7	6	21
3	Denmark	4	1	2	7
4	Canada	2	2	0	4
5	United States	2	1	1	4
6	South Africa	2	0	1	3
7	Czech Republic	1	3	1	5
8	Italy	1	2	4	7
9	Belgium	1	1	3	5
9	Netherlands	1	1	3	5
11	Spain	1	1	2	4
12	Great Britain	1	0	3	4
13	Germany	0	1	0	1
13	New Zealand	0	1	0	1
13	Norway	0	1	0	1
16	Sweden	0	0	1	1
Totals (16 entries)		36	36	36	108

=== Medal table by rider ===
Rank	Rider	Gold	Silver	Bronze	Total
1	Nino Schurter (SUI)	10	2	1	13
2	Julien Absalon (FRA)	5	2	2	9
3	Henrik Djernis (DEN)	3	1	0	4
4	Roland Green (CAN)	2	1	0	3
5	Tom Pidcock (GBR)	2	0	1	3
6	Alan Hatherly (RSA)	2	0	0	2
7	Thomas Frischknecht (SUI)	1	4	2	7
8	Jaroslav Kulhavý (CZE)	1	3	0	4
9	Christoph Sauser (SUI)	1	2	1	4
10	Miguel Martinez (FRA)	1	2	0	3
11	Filip Meirhaeghe (BEL)	1	1	2	4
12	Bart Brentjens (NED)	1	0	2	3
12	José Antonio Hermida (ESP)	1	0	2	3
14	Hubert Pallhuber (ITA)	1	0	1	2
14	Jordan Sarrou (FRA)	1	0	1	2
14	Ned Overend (USA)	1	0	1	2
17	Christophe Dupouey (FRA)	1	0	0	1
17	John Tomac (USA)	1	0	0	1
17	Michael Rasmussen (DEN)	1	0	0	1
20	Mathias Flückiger (SUI)	0	3	1	4
21	Florian Vogel (SUI)	0	1	2	3
21	Victor Koretzky (FRA)	0	1	2	3
23	Ralph Näf (SUI)	0	1	1	2
24	Cédric Ravanel (FRA)	0	1	0	1
24	Gerhard Kerschbaumer (ITA)	0	1	0	1
24	Jerome Chiotti (FRA)	0	1	0	1
24	Lukas Flückiger (SUI)	0	1	0	1
24	Manuel Fumic (GER)	0	1	0	1
24	Marcel Gerritsen (NED)	0	1	0	1
24	Rune Høydahl (NOR)	0	1	0	1
24	Ryder Hesjedal (CAN)	0	1	0	1
24	Samuel Gaze (NZL)	0	1	0	1
24	Simone Avondetto (ITA)	0	1	0	1
24	Tinker Juarez (USA)	0	1	0	1
35	Jan Erik Østergaard (DEN)	0	0	2	2
36	Burry Stander (RSA)	0	0	1	1
36	David Baker (GBR)	0	0	1	1
36	Fredrik Kessiakoff (SWE)	0	0	1	1
36	Luca Bramati (ITA)	0	0	1	1
36	Marco Aurelio Fontana (ITA)	0	0	1	1
36	Mathieu van der Poel (NED)	0	0	1	1
36	Ondřej Cink (CZE)	0	0	1	1
36	Roel Paulissen (BEL)	0	0	1	1
36	Stéphane Tempier (FRA)	0	0	1	1
36	Thomas Litscher (SUI)	0	0	1	1
36	Tim Gould (GBR)	0	0	1	1
