= 1997 UCI Mountain Bike World Championships =

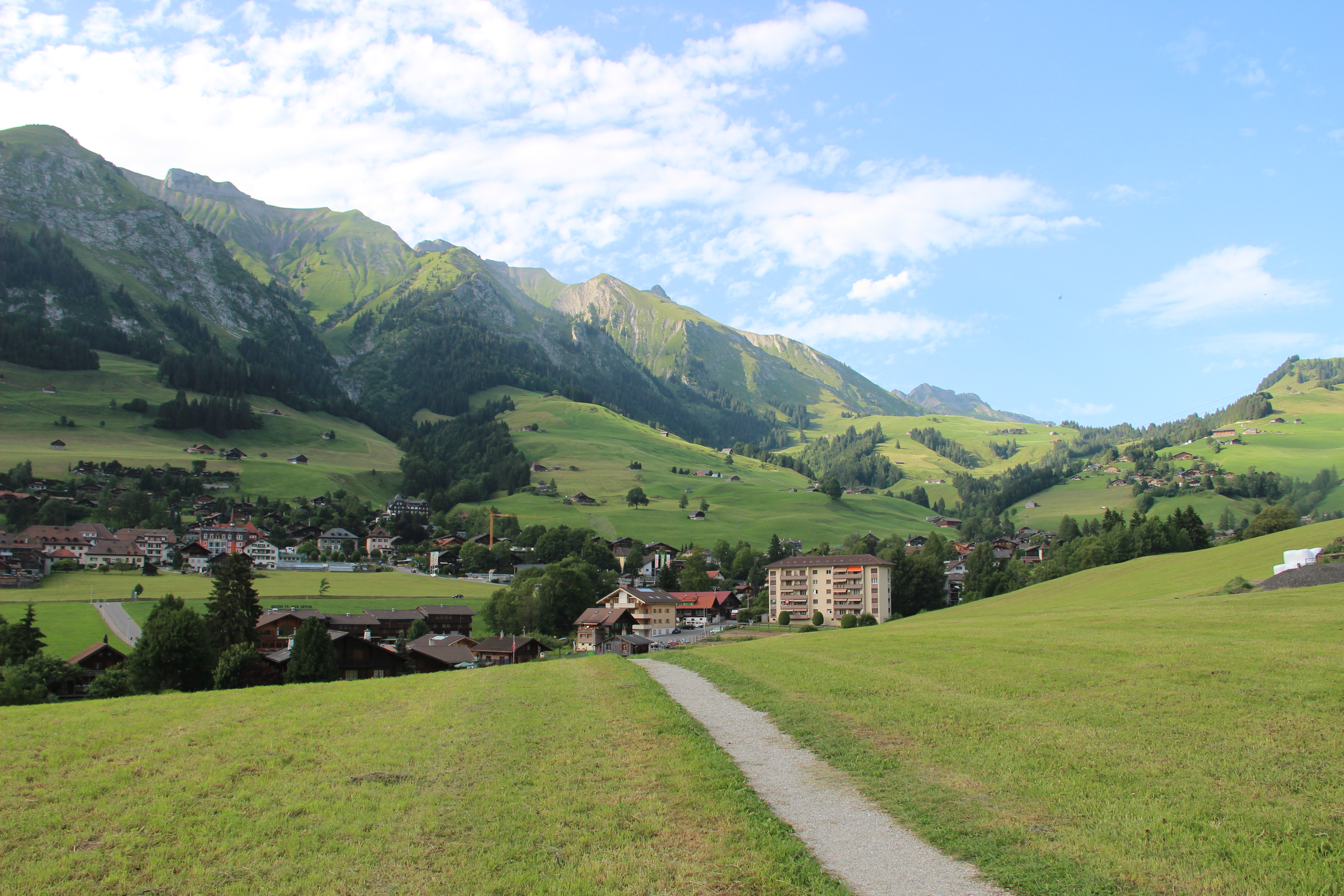
- Venue: Château-d'Œx, Switzerland
- Date: 18–21 September 1997
- Events: 9

The 1997 UCI Mountain Bike World Championships were held in Château-d'Œx, Switzerland from 18 to 21 September 1997. The disciplines included were cross-country and downhill. The event was the 8th edition of the UCI Mountain Bike World Championships and the first to be held in Switzerland.

== Medal summary ==
=== Men's events ===
Event	Gold	Silver	Bronze
Cross-country	Hubert Pallhuber (ITA)	Henrik Djernis (DEN)	Luca Bramati (ITA)
Under 23 cross-country	Miguel Martinez (FRA)	Cadel Evans (AUS)	Dario Acquaroli (ITA)
Junior cross-country	Franz Kehl (SUI)	Mathias Mende (GER)	Marian Masny (SVK)
Downhill	Nicolas Vouilloz (FRA)	John Tomac (USA)	Cédric Gracia (FRA)
Junior downhill	Mickael Pascal (FRA)	David Vázquez López (ESP)	Tobias Westman (SWE)

=== Women's events ===
Event	Gold	Silver	Bronze
Cross-country	Paola Pezzo (ITA)	Nadia de Negri (ITA)	Margarita Fullana (ESP)
Junior cross-country	Cecilia Potts (USA)	Helena Eriksson (SWE)	Anna Szafraniec (POL)
Downhill	Anne-Caroline Chausson (FRA)	Marielle Saner (SUI)	Katja Repo (FIN)
Junior downhill	Sara Stieger (SUI)	Tracy Moseley (GBR)	Sabrina Jonnier (FRA)

=== Medal table ===
Rank	Nation	Gold	Silver	Bronze	Total
1	France (FRA)	4	0	1	5
2	Italy (ITA)	2	1	2	5
3	Switzerland (SUI)	2	1	0	3
4	United States (USA)	1	1	0	2
5	Great Britain (GBR)	0	1	1	2
5	Spain (ESP)	0	1	1	2
5	Sweden (SWE)	0	1	1	2
8	Australia (AUS)	0	1	0	1
8	Denmark (DEN)	0	1	0	1
8	Germany (GER)	0	1	0	1
11	Finland (FIN)	0	0	1	1
11	Poland (POL)	0	0	1	1
11	Slovakia (SVK)	0	0	1	1
Totals (13 entries)		9	9	9	27

== See also ==
- 1997 UCI Mountain Bike World Cup
