= Henrik Djernis =

Danish cyclist (born 1968)

Personal information
- Born: 22 April 1968 (age 58) Svebølle, near Kalundborg, Denmark

Cycling career
- Sport: Cycling
- Current team: Retired
- Disciplines: Mountain bike; Cyclo-cross; Road
- Role: Rider

Major wins
- Mountain bike World XC Championships (1992, 1993, 1994)
Medal record
Representing Denmark
Men's mountain bike racing
World Championships
Gold medal – first place	1992 Bromont	Cross-country
Gold medal – first place	1993 Métabief	Cross-country
Gold medal – first place	1994 Vail	Cross-country
Silver medal – second place	1997 Château-d'Œx	Cross-country
Men's cyclo-cross
World Championships
Bronze medal – third place	1988 Hägendorf	Under-23 race
Silver medal – second place	1991 Gieten	Under-23 race
Gold medal – first place	1993 Corva	Amateur men's race
Bronze medal – third place	1998 Middelfart	Elite men's race

Henrik Djernis (born 22 April 1968) is a Danish cyclist. He competed in cyclo-cross, mountain bike and road racing. He was the first man to win the World Mountain Bike Championship three times, which he did in 1992 (in Bromont, QC, Canada), 1993 (in Métabief, France), and 1994 (in Vail, CO, United States). Djernis won the Danish Cyclocross National Championship ten times in a row from 1989 to 1998 and then won the title twice more in 2000 and 2001.

He has been nominated for induction into the Mountain Bike Hall of Fame by Tom Ritchey.

== Major results ==
=== Cyclo-cross ===
1983
1st National Junior Championships
1984
1st National Junior Championships
1985
1st National Championships
1986
1st National Championships
1987
1st National Championships
1988
1st National Championships
3rd UCI World Amateur Championships
1989
1st National Championships
1990
1st National Championships
1991
1st National Championships
2nd UCI World Amateur Championships
1992
1st National Championships
1993
1st National Championships
1st UCI World Amateur Championships
1994
1st National Championships
1995
1st National Championships
1996
1st National Championships
1997
1st National Championships
1998
1st National Championships
3rd UCI World Championships
2000
1st National Championships
2001
1st National Championships

=== Mountain bike ===
1992
1st Cross-country, UCI World Championships
1993
1st Cross-country, UCI World Championships
1st Cross-country, National Championships
1994
1st Cross-country, UCI World Championships
1st Cross-country, National Championships
1997
1st Cross-country, National Championships
2nd Cross-country, UCI World Championships
1998
1st Cross-country, National Championships
1999
1st Cross-country, National Championships
2000
1st Cross-country, National Championships

== Sources ==
- Ritchey, Tom 1999 Biography of Henrik Djernis for his nomination to the Mountain Bike Hall of Fame
