= 1999 UCI Mountain Bike World Championships =

- Venue: Åre, Sweden
- Date(s): 15–19 September 1999
- Events: 10

The 1999 UCI Mountain Bike World Championships were the 10th edition of the UCI Mountain Bike World Championships and were held in Åre in the North of Sweden. The events included were cross-country and downhill.

The 1999 UCI Mountain Bike World Championships were the first to include the cross-country team relay. The Spanish team won the inaugural world title in the discipline.

Nicolas Vouilloz won his fifth consecutive world title in the elite men's downhill. Anne-Caroline Chausson won her fourth consecutive world title in the elite women's downhill.

== Medal summary ==
=== Men's events ===
Event	Gold	Silver	Bronze
Cross-country	Michael Rasmussen (DEN)	Miguel Martinez (FRA)	Filip Meirhaeghe (BEL)
Under 23 cross-country	Marco Bui (ITA)	Cadel Evans (AUS)	Martino Fruet (ITA)
Junior cross-country	Nicolas Filippi (FRA)	Carlos Coloma (ESP)	Florian Vogel (SUI)
Downhill	Nicolas Vouilloz (FRA)	Mickael Pascal (FRA)	Eric Carter (USA)
Junior downhill	Nathan Rennie (AUS)	David Wardell (GBR)	Jarrod Rando (AUS)

=== Women's events ===
Event	Gold	Silver	Bronze
Cross-country	Margarita Fullana Riera (ESP)	Alison Sydor (CAN)	Paola Pezzo (ITA)
Junior cross-country	Anna Szafraniec (POL)	Lea Fluckiger (SUI)	Sonja Traxel (SUI)
Downhill	Anne-Caroline Chausson (FRA)	Katja Repo (FIN)	Sari Jorgensen (SUI)
Junior downhill	Sabrina Jonnier (FRA)	Kathy Pruitt (USA)	Helen Gaskell (GBR)

=== Team events ===
Event	Gold	Silver	Bronze
Cross-country	Spain; Roberto Lezaun; Margarita Fullana Riera; Carlos Coloma; José Antonio Hermida	France; Miguel Martinez; Sandra Temporelli; Julien Absalon; Nicolas Filippi	Canada; Roland Green; Alison Sydor; Ryder Hesjedal; Ricky Federau

=== Medal table ===
Rank	Nation	Gold	Silver	Bronze	Total
1	France (FRA)	4	3	0	7
2	Spain (ESP)	2	1	0	3
3	Australia (AUS)	1	1	1	3
4	Italy (ITA)	1	0	2	3
5	Denmark (DEN)	1	0	0	1
5	Poland (POL)	1	0	0	1
7	Switzerland (SUI)	0	1	3	4
8	Canada (CAN)	0	1	1	2
8	Great Britain (GBR)	0	1	1	2
8	United States (USA)	0	1	1	2
11	Finland (FIN)	0	1	0	1
12	Belgium (BEL)	0	0	1	1
Totals (12 entries)		10	10	10	30

== See also ==
- 1999 UCI Mountain Bike World Cup
