= 1996 UCI Mountain Bike World Championships =

Cycling race

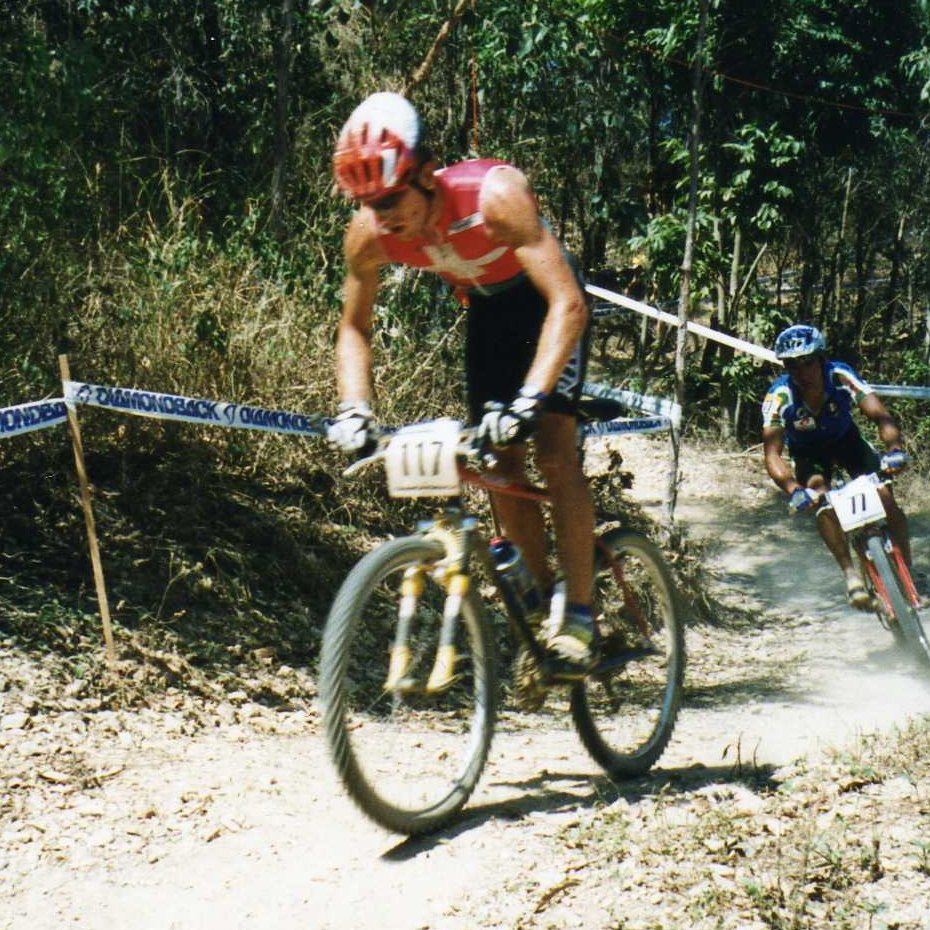
- Venue: Cairns, Australia
- Date(s): 18–19 September 1996
- Events: 9

The 1996 UCI Mountain Bike World Championships was the 7th edition of the UCI Mountain Bike World Championships. The events included were cross-country and downhill.

The 1996 UCI Mountain Bike World Championships were the first to be held in Australia, all previous editions having been held in North America or Europe.

== Medal summary ==
=== Men's events ===
Event	Gold	Silver	Bronze
Cross-country	Thomas Frischknecht (SUI)	Rune Høydahl (NOR)	Hubert Pallhuber (ITA)
Under 23 cross-country	Dario Acquaroli (ITA)	Miguel Martinez (FRA)	Cadel Evans (AUS)
Junior cross-country	José Antonio Hermida (ESP)	Mickaël Reynaud (FRA)	Håkon Austad (NOR)
Downhill	Nicolas Vouilloz (FRA)	Shaun Palmer (USA)	Bas De Bever (NED)
Junior downhill	Andy Büler (SUI)	Cédric Gracia (FRA)	Maxime Gardella (FRA)

=== Women's events ===
Event	Gold	Silver	Bronze
Cross-country	Alison Sydor (CAN)	Ruthie Matthes (USA)	Maria Paola Turcutto (ITA)
Junior cross-country	Helena Eriksson (SWE)	Emelie Öhrstig (SWE)	Sonja Morf (SUI)
Downhill	Anne-Caroline Chausson (FRA)	Leigh Donovan (USA)	Missy Giove (USA)
Junior downhill	Nolvenn Le Caër (FRA)	Sari Jörgensen (SUI)	Sabrina Jonnier (FRA)

=== Medal table ===
Rank	Nation	Gold	Silver	Bronze	Total
1	France (FRA)	3	3	2	8
2	Switzerland (SUI)	2	1	1	4
3	Sweden (SWE)	1	1	0	2
4	Italy (ITA)	1	0	2	3
5	Canada (CAN)	1	0	0	1
5	Spain (ESP)	1	0	0	1
7	United States (USA)	0	3	1	4
8	Norway (NOR)	0	1	1	2
9	Australia (AUS)	0	0	1	1
9	Netherlands (NED)	0	0	1	1
Totals (10 entries)		9	9	9	27

== See also ==
- 1996 UCI Mountain Bike World Cup
