= Red Bull Road Rage =

Bike competition

Race details
- Date: Various dates from May–November
- Region: Varying locations: USA, Switzerland, Italy, France, Germany, Belgium, Latvia, Israel, Poland and Bosnia & Herzegovina
- Local name: Red Bull Road Rage
- Nickname: Road Rage
- Discipline: Road
- Competition: Open to amateurs and professionals
- Type: Extreme downhill road racing
- Organiser: Red Bull

History
- First edition: 2005
- Editions: 12
- First winner: Miles Rockwell (USA)
- Most wins: Janos Köhler (IRL) 2
- Most recent: David McCook (USA)

The Red Bull Road Rage is an extreme downhill road cycling race promoted by Red Bull GmbH. The competition was first held in 2005 as a pro-invite only event, but since 2008 is open to amateur and professional racers. Red Bull Road Rage has seen editions held once in each Italy, France, Germany, Belgium, Latvia, Israel, Poland and Bosnia & Herzegovina and twice in Switzerland and the United States.

The event is similar to Four-cross mountain biking. An initial individual time trial ITT qualifying and seeding run (Note: Qualifying runs were held in a Four-cross format at the Red Bull Road Rage events in Cortina d’Ampezzo, Italy (2009), at La Redoute, Aywaille, Belgium (2010) in Sarajevo, Bosnia and Herzegovina and Guanella Pass, Georgetown, Colorado (2013)) is held, followed by the top 32 (Note: Only the top 16 riders rode the knock-out stages in Tuna Canyon, Malibu, California, USA (2005) and Guanella Pass, Georgetown, Colorado, USA (2013), whereas all 62 competitors raced the knock-out heats in Saint-Lary-Soulan, France (2009) and the top 64 riders contested the elimination rounds in Sigulda, Latvia (2010)) competitors racing four at a time in knock-out heats, with the two fastest progressing to the next round.

== History ==
The roots of Red Bull Road Rage can be traced back to Jon Mesko of Giant Bicycles, who came up with the idea in 2001. He contacted the Red Bull (North America) Communications Manager, Paul Melina, in 2004 to pitch the idea and in January 2005, Red Bull gave the green light to commence organising the event.

== 2005 ==
=== Tuna Canyon, Malibu, California, USA ===
The original Red Bull Road Rage was held down Tuna Canyon, Malibu in California, USA on 5 and 6 November 2005. The event was held on a 4.5 km course and included 49 bends with 390m elevation drop, giving an average gradient of 9.75% with a maximum of 18%.

==== Qualifying results ====
Place	Rider	Country	Time	Average speed (km/h)
1.	Myles Rockwell	USA	4:24.7	61.201
2.	David McCook	USA	4:25.9	60.925
3.	Brian Lopes	USA	4:28.6	60.313
4.	John Wike	USA	4:33.1	59.319

==== Final results ====
Place	Rider	Country	Time	Average speed (km/h)
1.	Myles Rockwell	USA	4:24.68	61.206
2.	Eric Carter	USA	*	**
3.	John Wike	USA	*	**
4.	Todd Tanner	USA	*	**

*Run only timed for first rider across the line. **No average speed can be calculated for these riders due to run only being timed for first placed rider.

== 2006 ==
=== Tuna Canyon, Malibu, California, USA ===
In 2006 the event was set to return to Tuna Canyon, Malibu, California, scheduled for 11 November. 25 of the world's top professional racers from road and mountain biking were on the official start list. On 31 October following evaluation of the then fire danger conditions, the decision was made to cancel the event due to fire safety concerns from the Malibu City fire chief.

== 2007 ==
No Red Bull Road Rage was held in 2007.

== 2008 ==
=== Gurnigelpass, Switzerland ===
In 2008 Red Bull Road Rage was held again, this time for the first time in Europe. It was also the first time the event was opened up to amateur and professional riders. The event was held on a 3.8 km course with 340m elevation drop, descending the Gurnigelpass in Switzerland. Average gradient was 8.95% with a maximum of 18%.

==== Qualifying results ====
Place	Rider	Country	Time	Average speed (km/h)
1.	Johannes Fischbach	Germany
2.	Guillaume Gualandi	France
3.	Stefan Hofmeier	Switzerland
4.	Fabian Christen	Switzerland

==== Final results ====
Place	Rider	Country	Time	Average speed (km/h)
1.	Guillaume Gualandi	France	*	**
2.	Johannes Fischbach	Germany	*	**
3.	Stefan Hofmeier	Switzerland	*	**
4.	Fabian Christen	Switzerland	*	**

*Run not timed. **No average speed can be calculated due to run not being timed.

== 2009 ==
For the first time, 2009 saw multiple events held across Europe, with a total of four races. Three new venues were added including Italy, France and Germany and the season finale saw a return to racing in Switzerland.

=== Cortina d’Ampezzo, Italy ===
The 2009 Red Bull Road Rage season opener was held for the first time in Italy, on 21 and 22 June 2009. The event was held on a 5 km course with 360m elevation drop, descending into Cortina d’Ampezzo in the Dolomites. Average gradient was 7.4% with a maximum of 12%.

==== Qualifying results ====
Place	Rider	Country	Time	Average speed (km/h)
1.	Guillaume Gualandi	France	4:51.02	61.851
2.	Fred Mazières	France	4:51.08	61.839
3.	Mauro Bettin	Italy	4:51.09	61.837
4.	Nitai Da Sacco	Italy	4:56.20	60.770

==== Final results ====
Place	Rider	Country	Time	Average speed (km/h)
1.	Mauro Bettin	Italy	*	**
2.	Fred Mazières	France	*	**
3.	Luca Pais Marden	Italy	*	**
4.	Guillaume Gualandi	France	*	**

*Run not timed. **No average speed can be calculated due to run not being timed.

=== Saint-Lary-Soulan, France ===
The second Red Bull Road Rage of the season was held for the first time in France, on 13 September 2009. The event was held on a 4.6 km course with 350m elevation drop, descending from Saint-Lary-Soulan in the Pyrenees. Average gradient was 7.6% with a maximum of 12%.

==== Qualifying results ====
Place	Rider	Country	Time	Average speed (km/h)
1.	Frédéric Moncassin	France	4:13.271	65.385
2.	Guillaume Gualandi	France	4:16.717	64.507
3.	Fred Mazières	France	4:18.035	64.177
4.	Janos Köhler	Ireland	4:19.171	63.896

==== Final results ====
Place	Rider	Country	Time	Average speed (km/h)
1.	Frédéric Moncassin	France	4:25.210	62.441
2.	Guillaume Gualandi	France	4:25.441	62.387
3.	David Lacoste	France	4:25.551	62.361
4.	Fred Mazières	France	4:28.055	61.778
5.	Cédric Gracia	France	4:40.683	58.999

=== Moritzberg, Germany ===
The third Red Bull Road Rage of the season was held for the first time in Germany, on 10 October 2009. The event was held on a 2.1 km course with 188m elevation drop, descending the Moritzberg, near Nuremberg. Average gradient was 8.95% with a maximum of 18%.

==== Qualifying results – Women ====
Place	Rider	Country	Time	Average speed (km/h)
1.	Birgit Braumann	Austria	2:26.138	49.761
2.	Sonja Granzow	Germany	2:27.555	49.283
3.	Leoni Dickerhoff	Germany	2:31.908	47.871
4.	Anja Jerenko	Germany	2:34.661	47.018

==== Final results – Women ====
Place	Rider	Country	Time	Average speed (km/h)
1.	Birgit Braumann	Austria	*	**
2.	Sonja Granzow	Germany	*	**
3.	Christina Mimler	Germany	*	**
4.	Leoni Dickerhoff	Germany	*	**

*Run not timed. **No average speed can be calculated due to run not being timed.

==== Qualifying results – Men ====
Place	Rider	Country	Time	Average speed (km/h)
1.	Thomas Schäfer	Germany	2:04.230	58.536
2.	Ivan Saladin	Switzerland	2:06.827	57.317
3.	Olaf Pollack	Germany	2:08.314	56.673
4.	Daniel Auerswald	Germany	2:08.922	56.406

==== Final results – Men ====
Place	Rider	Country	Time	Average speed (km/h)
1.	Thomas Schäfer	Germany	*	**
2.	Sebastian Körber	Germany	*	**
3.	Thomas Lerzer	Germany	*	**
4.	Stefan Hofmeier	Switzerland	*	**

*Run not timed. **No average speed can be calculated due to run not being timed.

Full table of results

=== Rengg, Switzerland ===
The 2009 Red Bull Road Rage season finale saw a return to racing in Switzerland, this time in Rengg, on 28 October 2009. The event was held on a 2.1 km course with 210m elevation drop, descending from Rengg into Entlebuch, Switzerland. Average gradient was 10% with a maximum of 16%.

==== Qualifying results ====
Place	Rider	Country	Time	Average speed (km/h)
1.	Janos Köhler	Ireland	1:39.31	76.125
2.	Michael Schärer	Switzerland	1:39.91	75.668
3.	David Lacoste	France	1:40.82	74.985
4.	Sebastian Körber	Germany	1:41.10	74.777

==== Final results ====
Place	Rider	Country	Time	Average speed (km/h)
1.	Sebastian Körber	Germany	*	**
2.	Janos Köhler	Ireland	*	**
3.	Michael Schärer	Switzerland	*	**
4.	David Lacoste	France	*	**

*Run not timed. **No average speed can be calculated due to run not being timed.

== 2010 ==
=== La Redoute, Aywaille, Belgium ===
The 2010 Red Bull Road Rage season opener was held for the first time in Belgium, 22 May 2010. The event was held on a 950m course with 95m elevation drop, descending La Redoute into Aywaille. Average gradient was 10% with a maximum of 22%.

==== Qualifying results ====
Place	Rider	Country	Time	Average speed (km/h)
1.	Janos Köhler	Ireland	0:50.26	72.117
2.	David Lacoste	France	0:50.53	71.744
3.	Guillaume Gaulandi	France	0:52.41	69.170
4.	François-Xavier Plaçais	France	0:52.63	68.874

==== Final results ====
Place	Rider	Country	Time	Average speed (km/h)
1.	Janos Köhler	Ireland	0:50.52	71.745
2.	Christian Lademann	Germany	0:51.07	70.984
3.	David Lacoste	France	0:51.09	70.947
4.	François-Xavier Plaçais	France	0:51.75	70.044

=== Sigulda, Latvia ===
The second 2010 Red Bull Road Rage event was held for the first time in Latvia, on 30 May 2010. The event was held on a 700m course with 80m elevation drop, descending along the National Bobsleigh Track access road in Sigulda, Latvia. Average gradient was 11.4% with a maximum of 15%.

==== Qualifying results – Women ====
Place	Rider	Country	Time	Average speed (km/h)
1.	Ivita Krūmiņa	Latvia	0:56.70	44.444
2.	Marta Garā	Latvia	0:59.50	42.353
3.	Aija Petrovska	Latvia	1:03.10	39.937
4.	Dace Gala	Latvia	1:06.20	38.066

==== Final results – Women ====
Place	Rider	Country	Time	Average speed (km/h)
1.	Ivita Krūmiņa	Latvia	0:52.85	47.682
2.	Marta Garā	Latvia	0:56.85	44.327
3.	Aija Petrovska	Latvia	0:58.35	43.188
4.	Dace Gala	Latvia	1:00.15	41.895

==== Qualifying results – Men ====
Place	Rider	Country	Time	Average speed (km/h)
1.	Juris Luščenoks	Latvia	0.46.85	53.789
2.	Gundars Osis	Latvia	0.47.05	53.560
3.	Mārtiņš Sproģis	Latvia	0.47.10	53.503
=4.	Reinis Avens	Latvia	0.47.35	53.221
=4.	Arnis Zdanovskis	Latvia	0.47.35	53.221

==== Final results – Men ====
Place	Rider	Country	Time	Average speed (km/h)
1.	Jānis Bulēvičs	Latvia	0:45.05	55.938
2.	Kristaps Osis	Latvia	0:45.25	55.691
3.	Reinis Avens	Latvia	0:45.35	55.568
4.	Mārtiņš Sproģis	Latvia	0:46.25	54.486

=== Hamat Gader, Israel ===
The 2010 Red Bull Road Rage season finale took place in yet another new venue, this time in Israel, 4 June 2010. The event was held on 3.3 km course with 295m elevation drop, descending from Mevo Hama to Hamat Gader, Israel. Average gradient was 8.94% with a maximum of 18%.

==== Qualifying results ====
Place	Rider	Country	Time	Average speed (km/h)
1.	Ben Kedmi	Israel	3:41.04	53.75
2.	Janos Köhler	Ireland	3:44.03	53.03
3.	Eli Vexler	Israel	3:45.16	52.76
4.	Chanoch Redlich	Israel	3:48.34	52.03

==== Final results ====
Place	Rider	Country	Time	Average speed (km/h)
1.	Ohad Ben Hamo	Israel	*	**
2.	Daniel Eliad	Israel	*	**
3.	Eli Wexler	Israel	*	**
4.	Janos Köhler	Ireland	*	**

*Run not timed. **No average speed can be calculated due to run not being timed.

== 2011 ==
=== Międzybrodzie Żywiecki, Poland ===
The only 2011 Red Bull Road Rage event was held for the first time in Poland, 1 October 2011. The event was held on a 4 km course with 260m elevation drop, descending Góra Żar to Międzybrodzie Żywiecki. Average gradient was 6.5% with a maximum of 14%.

==== Qualifying results ====
Place	Rider	Country	Time	Average speed (km/h)
1.	Arkadiusz Ustroń	Poland	3:52.43	61.954
2.	Christian Lademann	Germany	3:52.60	61.909
3.	Marcin Motyka	Poland	3.53.20	61.749
4.	Piotr Szafraniec	Poland	3.55.30	61.198

==== Final results ====
Place	Rider	Country	Time	Average speed (km/h)
1.	Piotr Szafraniec	Poland	*	**
2.	Christian Lademann	Germany	*	**
3.	Marcin Motyka	Poland	*	**
4.	Przemek Hrabia	Poland	*	**

*Run not timed. **No average speed can be calculated due to run not being timed.

== 2012 ==
No Red Bull Road Rage was held in 2012.

== 2013 ==
=== Mont Ventoux, France ===
Mont Ventoux was set to stage a return to racing in France on 8 June 2013. The race was to be over a 6 km course with 445m elevation drop, both the longest and the most vertical drop to date, descending from the summit of Mont Ventoux (Mont Chauve) to Chalet Reynard on the eastern slope. Average gradient was at 7.1% with a maximum of 15%. On Thursday 30 May, the event was cancelled due to non-permission from the competent administrative authorities, due to adverse weather conditions forecast.

=== Sarajevo, Bosnia and Herzegovina ===
The second scheduled Red Bull Road Rage race of 2013 became the season opener by default, on 6 July, after the event on Mont Ventoux was cancelled. The 3.5 km course with a total elevation drop of 280m was situated outside Sarajevo. Average gradient was at 8% with a maximum gradient of 12%.

==== Qualifying results ====
Qualify groups were drawn at random and knock-out rounds commenced immediately for the 44 riders, with the top two riders in each group qualifying automatically for the 1/8 final round. The remaining 10 places were drawn again at random from the third-place finishers, with all but one rider progressing to the 1/8 final round.

==== Final results ====
Place	Rider	Country	Time	Average speed (km/h)
1.	Janos Köhler	Ireland	*	**
2.	Mario Kojic	Bosnia and Herzegovina	*	**
3.	Stefan Tešanović	Bosnia and Herzegovina	*	**
4.	Nicholas Solomon	Bosnia and Herzegovina	*	**

*Run not timed. **No average speed can be calculated due to run not being timed.

=== Guanella Pass, Georgetown, Colorado, USA ===
Guanella Pass, Georgetown, Colorado, USA hosted the second Red Bull Road Rage of the season on 5 October 2013, making it the first time the race has returned to the US since its inauguration. The 2.5 km course with a total elevation drop of 170m was situated on Guanella pass above Georgetown, CO. At 3020m altitude, it is the first race to commence from altitude above 3000m. Average gradient was at 6.7% with a maximum gradient of 12%.

==== Qualifying results ====
Qualifying was held in a 4X format with a points system in operation, 22 for 1st, 16 for 2nd, 12 for 3rd and 9 for 4th. In the case of a tie on points after three rounds, in order to differentiate the riders' rankings, a coefficient based on the riders raced against and where they placed in the overall qualifying came into play.

Place	Rider	Country	Points	Coefficient
1.	David McCook	USA	66	376
2.	Kevin Soller	USA	66	376
3.	Janos Köhler	Ireland	66	276
4.	Scott Hackett	USA	60	378

==== Final results ====
Place	Rider	Country	Time	Average speed (km/h)
1.	David McCook	USA	*	**
2.	Janos Köhler	Ireland	*	**
3.	Dwight (Whitey) DeBroux	USA	*	**
4.	Mike Mitchell	USA	*	**

*Run not timed. **No average speed can be calculated due to run not being timed.

=== Rio de Janeiro, Brazil ===
For the first time, a South American country was also to feature as a location, with an event planned in Rio de Janeiro, Brazil on 26 October 2013, but this was later cancelled.

== 2014 - Present ==
No Red Bull Road Rage events have been held from 2014 onwards.

== Statistics ==
=== Courses ===
Race course distances and total elevation drop have varied from event to event. The original Red Bull Road Rage descending Tuna Canyon, Malibu, California, USA, was held on a 4.5 km course, with 390m elevation drop. The shortest course was in Sigulda, Latvia, measuring just 700m and including only 80m elevation drop. The longest course was in Cortina d’Ampezzo, Italy, with a total distance of 5 km and 360m elevation drop.

- Longest course: 5 km (Cortina d’Ampezzo, Italy)*
- Shortest course: 700m (Sigulda, Latvia)
- Highest elevation start point: 3020m (Guanella Pass, Georgetown, Colorado, USA)
- Lowest elevation start point: 100m (Sigulda, Latvia)
- Highest elevation finishing point: 2850m (Guanella Pass, Georgetown, Colorado, USA)
- Lowest elevation finishing point: -85m (Hamat Gader, Israel)
- Most elevation drop: 390m (Tuna Canyon, Malibu, California, USA)*
- Least elevation drop: 80m (Sigulda, Latvia)
- Steepest maximum gradient: 22% (La Redoute, Aywaille, Belgium)
- Steepest average gradient: 11.4% (Sigulda, Latvia)
- Flattest average gradient: 6.5% (Międzybrodzie Żywiecki, Poland)

* The planned course for the later cancelled event on Mont Ventoux, France, would have been the longest distance with 6 km and the biggest elevation drop with 445m.

=== Fastest speeds ===
The fastest officially recorded top speed was by Mauro Bettin in 2009 during the Italian Road Rage in Cortina d’Ampezzo, at 98.5 km/h. The fastest speed in wet conditions was recorded by Janos Köhler in 2013 during the Bosnian Road Rage in Sarajevo, at 97.3 km/h.

The fastest average speed during a timed run is Janos Köhler's ITT qualifying run in 2009 during the Swiss Road Rage in Rengg, at 76.125 km/h. David Lacoste holds the record for the highest recorded average speed during normal racing, when in 2010 during the Belgian Road Rage he achieved an average speed of 72.271 km/h during his semi final run.

=== Riders ===
The most participations have been by Janos Köhler with 8, who has contested five finals and achieved four podium finishes. Janos Köhler is also the only rider to win two overall titles and to qualify in 1st place twice achieving the latter in two consecutive races. Guillaume Gualandi holds the record for the most consecutive appearances in a final with three. Janos Köhler and Sebastian Körber hold the record for the most consecutive podium finishes with two each, the Irishman doing so on two occasions. Guillaume Gualandi and Janos Köhler are the only riders to be ranked #1 in the World Rankings more than once, the Frenchman doing so in consecutive years, thus also the only rider to successfully defend a #1 World Ranking. Seven riders have won both the qualifying run and the final at the same event: Miles Rockwell – Tuna Canyon, Malibu, California (2005); Frédéric Moncassin – Saint-Lary-Soulan, France (2009); Birgit Braumann and Thomas Schäfer – Moritzberg, Germany (2009); Janos Köhler – La Redoute, Aywaille, Belgium (2010); Ivita Krūmiņa – Sigulda, Latvia (2010); and David McCook - Guanella Pass, Georgetown, Colorado (2013). The most successful rider is Janos Köhler with two wins, twice 2nd and a 4th place. The oldest rider to win is David McCook, who was 44 years and 210 days old when he won in Guanella Pass, Georgetown, Colorado. The youngest winner was Thomas Schäfer who was 25 years and 132 days old when he won on the Moritzberg, Germany.

=== Finals appearances ===
One rider has contested five finals:

- Janos Köhler (IRL) (Rengg, Switzerland 2009: 2nd; La Redoute, Aywaille, Belgium 2010: 1st; Hamat Gader, Israel 2010: 4th; Sarajevo, Bosnia and Herzegovina 2013: 1st; Guanella Pass, Georgetown, Colorado 2013: 2nd)

Two riders have contested 3 finals each:

- Guillaume Gualandi (FRA) (Gurnigelpass, Switzerland 2008: 1st; Cortina d’Ampezzo, Italy 2009: 4th; Saint-Lary-Soulan, France 2009: 2nd)
- David Lacoste (FRA) (Saint-Lary-Soulan, France 2009: 3rd; Rengg, Switzerland 2009: 4th; La Redoute, Aywaille, Belgium 2010: 3rd)

=== Event wins by nationality – Men ===
Event victories	Country
2	FranceGermanyIrelandUnited States
1	IsraelItalyLatviaPoland

=== Event wins by nationality – Women ===
Event victories	Country
1	AustriaLatvia

== World rankings ==
Although there is no recognised points system in place, as each race has been run as a stand-alone event, based on full season of race results, the following riders finished as the #1 World Ranked Red Bull Road Rage athletes.

- 2005 - Myles Rockwell (USA)*
- 2008 - Guillaume Gualandi (FRA)*
- 2009 - Guillaume Gualandi (FRA)
- 2010 - Janos Köhler (IRL)
- 2011 - Piotr Szafraniec (POL)*
- 2013 - Janos Köhler (IRL)

*Full season comprising one single event only.
