= Dario Acquaroli =

Italian cyclist (1975–2023)

Personal information
- Born: 10 March 1975 San Giovanni Bianco, Lombardy, Italy
- Died: 9 April 2023 (aged 48) Camerata Cornello, Lombardy, Italy

Cycling career
- Sport: Cycling
- Discipline: Mountain bike racing
- Role: Rider
- Rider type: Cross-country cycling
Medal record
Men's mountain bike racing
Representing Italy
World Championships
Bronze medal – third place	2005 Lillehammer	Marathon

Dario Acquaroli (10 March 1975 – 9 April 2023) was an Italian cross-country mountain biker.

Acquaroli was world cross-country champion in the junior category in 1993 as well in the under-23 category in 1996. He also won the bronze medal in the Mountain Bike Marathon World Championship in 2005. He was awarded the Gold Collar for Sports Merit by the Italian National Olympic Committee.

Acquaroli died of a heart attack on 9 April 2023, at the age of 48.
