= Filip Meirhaeghe =

Belgian cyclist

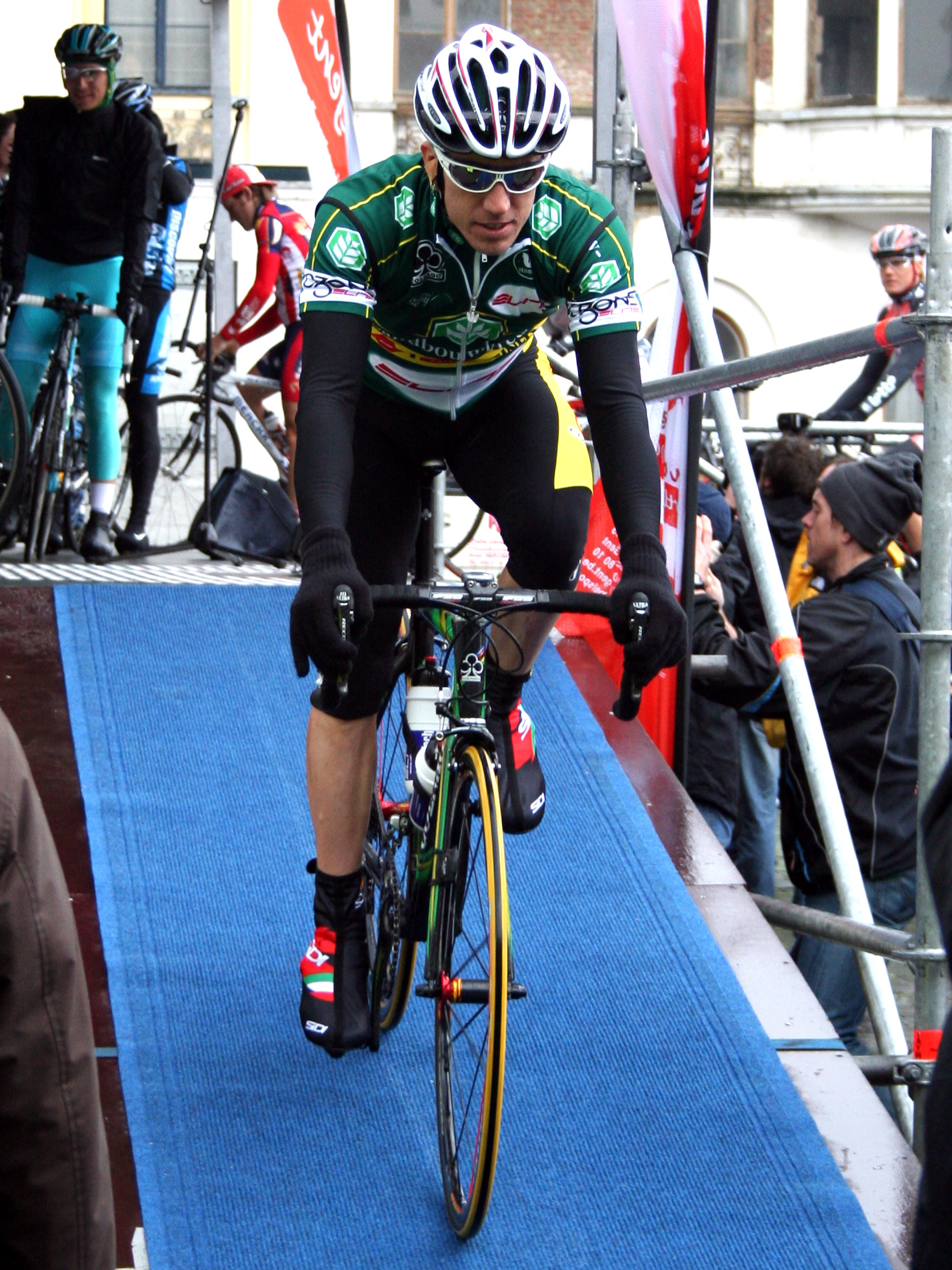
- Meirhaeghe at the start of Omloop het Volk in 2007.

Personal information
- Full name: Filip Meirhaeghe
- Born: 5 March 1971 (age 55) Ghent, Belgium

Cycling career
- Sport: Cycling
- Current team: Retired
- Disciplines: Road, Mountain bike
- Role: Rider

Major wins
- Silver medal 2000 Summer Olympics (Mountain bike); UCI MTB Cross Country World Championship (2003); UCI Mountain Bike World Cup (2002)
Medal record
Men's mountain bike racing
Representing Belgium
Olympic Games
Silver medal – second place	2000 Sydney	Cross-country
World Championships
Gold medal – first place	2003 Lugano	Cross-country
Silver medal – second place	2002 Kaprun	Cross-country
Bronze medal – third place	1998 Mont Sainte-Anne	Cross-country
Bronze medal – third place	1999 Åre	Cross-country

Filip Meirhaeghe (born 5 March 1971) is a retired Belgian racing cyclist. His primary focus was in mountain bike racing, however, he has also taken part in elite road, cyclo-cross and track cycling. He has won four Mountain Bike World Championships medals, one Olympic medal and a total of eleven mountain bike World Cup events. In the final years of his racing career he raced for the bicycle manufacturer Specialized Bicycle Components on the mountain bike and for the professional team Domina Vacanze-Elitron on the road.

== Doping ==
On 29 July 2004, just before the Athens 2004 Summer Olympics, Meirhaeghe admitted to having used EPO. He tested positive during the World Cup in Mont Sainte-Anne, Quebec (Canada) and unlike most racers did not argue the validity of the test. During a press conference he admitted he used EPO simply because of his desire to win gold at the Olympics. He also announced at that time he would stop racing and retire. He wrote a book called Positief, which tells the story of his life as an athlete and the consequences of his positive test. (issued by Davidsfonds – in Dutch only).

== End of retirement ==
Filip was suspended from professional racing until 14 January 2006 based on his positive test result. On 1 January 2006, he announced he would resume racing. He signed a three-year contract to race for Landbouwkrediet-Colnago on the road and Versluys-Landbouwkrediet-Sportstech on mountain bikes. He made his comeback during the beach-race of Oostduinkerke (Belgium). He retired again in September 2009.

== Major racing achievements ==
- 2000 Summer Olympics
  - Silver: 2000 – Sydney (AUS)
- Mountain Bike World Championships
  - Gold: 2003 – Lugano (SUI)
  - Silver: 2002 – Kaprun (AUT)
  - Bronze: 1998 – Mont Sainte-Anne (CAN)
  - Bronze: 1999 – Åre (SWE)
- Mountain Bike World Cup
  - Winner: 2002
- European XC MTB Championships
  - Champion: 2000
- Belgian XC MTB Championships
  - Champion: 1996, 1998, 2000, 2001
- Belgian Downhill National Championships
  - Champion 1994
- Paris–Roubaix mountain bike
  - Winner: 1997, 2002

== See also ==
- List of doping cases in cycling
- List of sportspeople sanctioned for doping offences
