= Cadel Evans =

Australian road bicycle racer (born 1977)

Cadel Evans AM
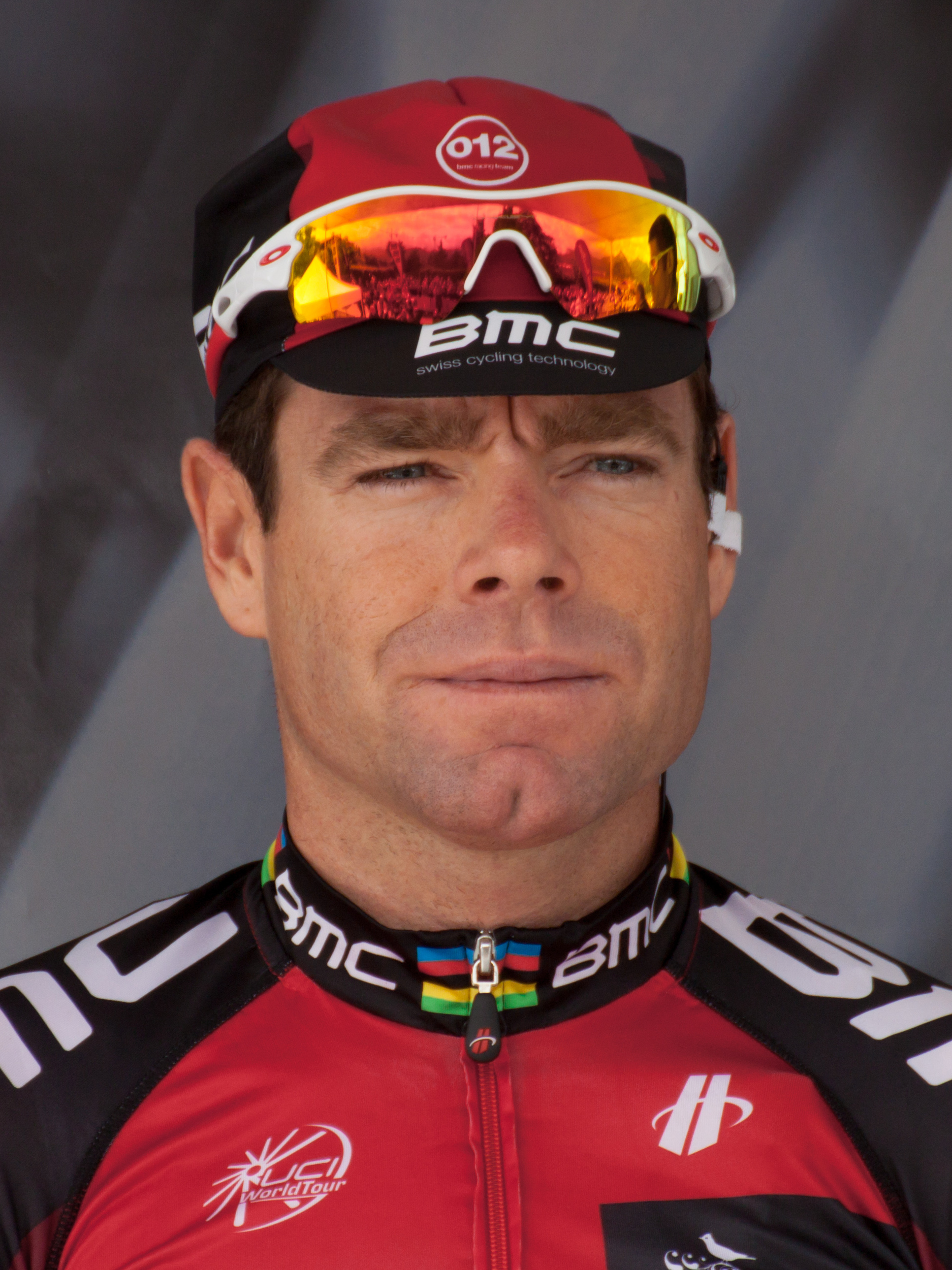
- Evans at the 2012 Critérium du Dauphiné

Personal information
- Full name: Cadel Lee Evans
- Born: 14 February 1977 (age 49) Katherine, Northern Territory, Australia
- Height: 1.74 m (5 ft 8 1/2 in)
- Weight: 64 kg (141 lb; 10 st 1 lb)

Cycling career
- Sport: Cycling
- Current team: Retired
- Disciplines: Road, Mountain bike
- Role: Rider
- Rider type: All-rounder

Amateur teams
- 1994–1999: Australian Institute of Sport (AIS)
- 2001: Victorian Institute of Sport (VIS)

Professional teams
- 1999: Volvo-Cannondale (MTB)
- 2001: Saeco
- 2002: Mapei–Quick-Step
- 2003–2004: Team Telekom
- 2005–2009: Davitamon–Lotto
- 2010–2015: BMC Racing Team

Major wins
- Mountain bike XC World Cup (1998, 1999) 8 individual wins (1997–2000) Road Grand Tours Tour de France General classification (2011) 2 individual stages (2007, 2011) Giro d'Italia Points classification (2010) 1 individual stage (2010) Stage races Tour de Romandie (2006, 2011) Tirreno–Adriatico (2011) Tour of Austria (2001, 2004) Critérium International (2012) Giro del Trentino (2014) Settimana Coppi e Bartali (2008) One-day races and Classics World Road Race Championships (2009) La Flèche Wallonne (2010) Other UCI ProTour (2007)
Medal record
Representing Australia
Men's road bicycle racing
Commonwealth Games
Gold medal – first place	2002 Manchester	Road time trial
Silver medal – second place	2002 Manchester	Road race
World Championships
Gold medal – first place	2009 Mendrisio	Road race
Bronze medal – third place	1995 Forlì	Junior time trial
Men's Mountain biking
World Championships
Silver medal – second place	1994 Vail	Junior cross-country
Silver medal – second place	1997 Château-d'Œx	Under 23 cross-country
Silver medal – second place	1999 Åre	Under 23 cross-country
Silver medal – second place	2001 Vail	Cross-country relay
Silver medal – second place	1995 Kirchzarten	Junior cross-country
Bronze medal – third place	1996 Cairns	Under 23 cross-country

Cadel Lee Evans (/kəˈdɛl/; born 14 February 1977) is an Australian former professional racing cyclist who competed professionally in both mountain biking and road bicycle racing. A four-time Olympian, Evans is one of three non-Europeans – along with Greg LeMond, and Egan Bernal – to have won the Tour de France, winning the race in 2011.

Early in his career, he was a champion mountain biker, winning the UCI Mountain Bike World Cup in 1998 and 1999 and placing seventh in the men's cross-country mountain bike race at the 2000 Summer Olympics in Sydney. Evans has competed in four Olympics: in 1996 and 2000 (mountain bike), and in 2008 and 2012 (road bike). Evans turned to full-time road cycling in 2001, and gradually progressed through the ranks. He finished second in the Tour de France in 2007 and 2008. Both of these 2nd place finishes are in the top 10 of the closest Tours in history. He became the first Australian to win the UCI ProTour (2007) and the UCI Road World Championships in 2009.

After finishing outside the top twenty in 2009 and 2010, Evans became the first Australian rider to win the Tour de France in 2011, riding for the BMC Racing Team. He took the race lead on the penultimate day, after completing a 42.5-kilometre (26.4-mile) individual time trial some two-and-a-half minutes quicker than his closest rivals, Andy Schleck and Fränk Schleck. At age 34, he was among the five oldest winners in the race's history. He also made the podium in the 2009 Vuelta a España and the 2013 Giro d'Italia.

Evans retired on 1 February 2015, after completing a race named in his honour.

== Early life ==
Cadel Evans was born on 14 February 1977 at the Katherine District Hospital, Katherine, Northern Territory, Australia, to Helen (née Cocks), a bank manager, and Paul Evans, a council foreman. He spent his early childhood in the small Aboriginal community of Barunga, 80 kilometres (50 miles) east of Katherine. At the age of seven, he was hit in the head by a horse, and spent seven days in an induced coma. In 1986, his parents separated and he first moved with his mother to Armidale, New South Wales, and then to the Melbourne suburb of Eltham, Victoria, where his mother still lives. Evans attended Newling Public School in Armidale, and Eltham High School in Melbourne. Skateboarding was one of his teenage interests. His father describes him as a good student, but otherwise just an ordinary kid who would leave his toys around; "Not in [my] wildest dreams" would he imagine that his son would become a top world athlete.

== Career ==
=== Mountain biking career ===
Evans started his international career in 1995 as a Scholarship-holder in the Australian Institute of Sport mountain bike (MTB) Program, under A.I.S. Cycling Program's MTB coach Damian Grundy, and up to 1998 under road coach Heiko Salzwedel. While Evans was at the Australian Institute of Sport, physiological tests showed he possessed a rare combination – an unusually high lung volume and the capacity to absorb more oxygen from each breath than 99.9 per cent of the population. This ability led to him becoming known as 'The Lung'.

Evans won bronze medals at the 1995 Junior world mountain bike championship and Junior world road time trial championship, and silver medals at the 1997 and 1999 under-23 world championships. He won the cross-country overall trophy in the UCI Mountain Bike World Cup in both 1998 and 1999. In 1998 Shayne Bannan was the under-23 road cycling coach based in Italy.

Evans competed in two Olympics in mountain bike events: finishing ninth in cross-country at the 1996 Olympics, then finishing seventh at the 2000 Olympics.

In 1997, he rode for the Diamondback MTB team, and then for the Volvo–Cannondale MTB team.

In March 2017, Evans was back on a mountain bike and competing in the Masters category at the eight-day Cape Epic stage race in South Africa over 641 kilometres (398 miles). The race, held in a two-person team format saw Evans partner George Hincapie – his domestique at the 2011 Tour de France – and they won the category.

=== Switch to road cycling ===
Cadel Evans had a breakthrough road cycling performance at the 1999 Tour of Tasmania, where commentator Phil Liggett famously proclaimed that Evans would win the Tour de France one day. It was not until 2001, however, that Evans officially made the switch to road cycling and joined the Saeco team. He spent one year with Saeco in 2001 and another year with Mapei–Quick-Step in 2002 before two years with T-Mobile Team (2003–2004). Other early successes included overall wins in the 2001 and 2004 editions of the Tour of Austria, 14th in the 2002 Giro d'Italia (he wore the general classification leader's pink jersey for one day), Commonwealth Games time trial champion in 2002 and a stage win of the 2002 Tour Down Under.

At Mapei, he was coached by Aldo Sassi, who helped him make the transition from mountain biker to grand tourer. After Sassi's death from cancer in 2010, Evans continued cooperation with his protege Andrea Morelli. After winning the Tour de France in 2011, Evans dedicated the victory to the late coach.

=== Davitamon–Lotto (2005–09) ===
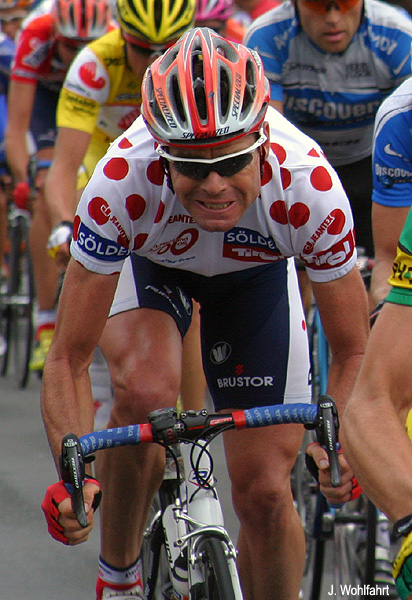
Evans at the 2005 Deutschland Tour

From the 2005 season he joined Davitamon–Lotto and came eighth in his first Tour de France, the first Australian in the top ten since Phil Anderson. He finished fifth at the Deutschland Tour.

In 2006, Evans started the season by winning the mountains classification in the Tour Down Under. Evans won the Tour de Romandie, beating Spanish riders Alberto Contador and Alejandro Valverde on the last stage, a 20-kilometre (12-mile) time trial around Lausanne. He finished fifth in the Tour de France but was promoted to fourth after the disqualification of apparent winner Floyd Landis due to a failed drug test. Evans was also named Australian Cyclist of the Year.

In the 2007 Tour de France, Evans finished runner-up to Contador. He won the stage 13 individual time trial and came second in the stage 19 individual time trial. Evans finished fourth in the Vuelta a España. He came fifth in the world championship and sixth in the final UCI ProTour race, the Giro di Lombardia. As a result, he won the overall ProTour classification with 247 points ahead of Davide Rebellin and Contador. He was again named Australian Cyclist of the Year.

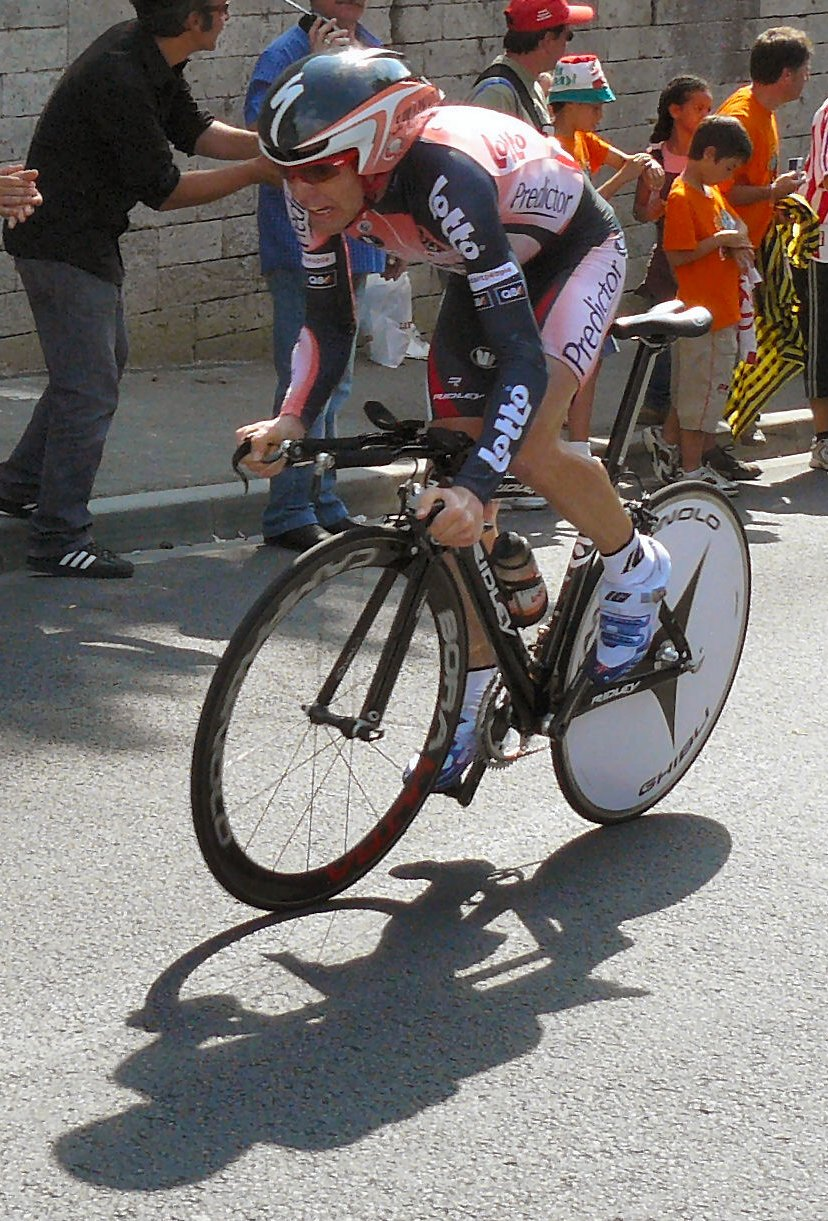
Evans during the decisive time trial of the 2007 Tour de France

The 2008 season saw Evans become one of Australia's most successful cyclists after consecutive podium places at the Tour de France. Evans was a favourite to win the Tour de France because Contador was not allowed to participate as his team Astana were not invited. Evans held the yellow jersey as leader of the general classification from stages 10 to 14. However, during Alpe d'Huez on stage 17, Carlos Sastre of Team CSC took 2 minutes 15 seconds from Evans. By the penultimate stage time trial, Evans needed to ride 1 minute 34 seconds faster than Sastre. He beat Sastre and jumped to second place but remained 58 seconds behind at the end of the Tour. While recovering from a ruptured anterior cruciate ligament, Evans contested the 245-kilometre (152-mile) men's road race at the Beijing Olympics, finishing 15th, 22 seconds behind Samuel Sánchez. He placed fifth in the road time trial four days later.

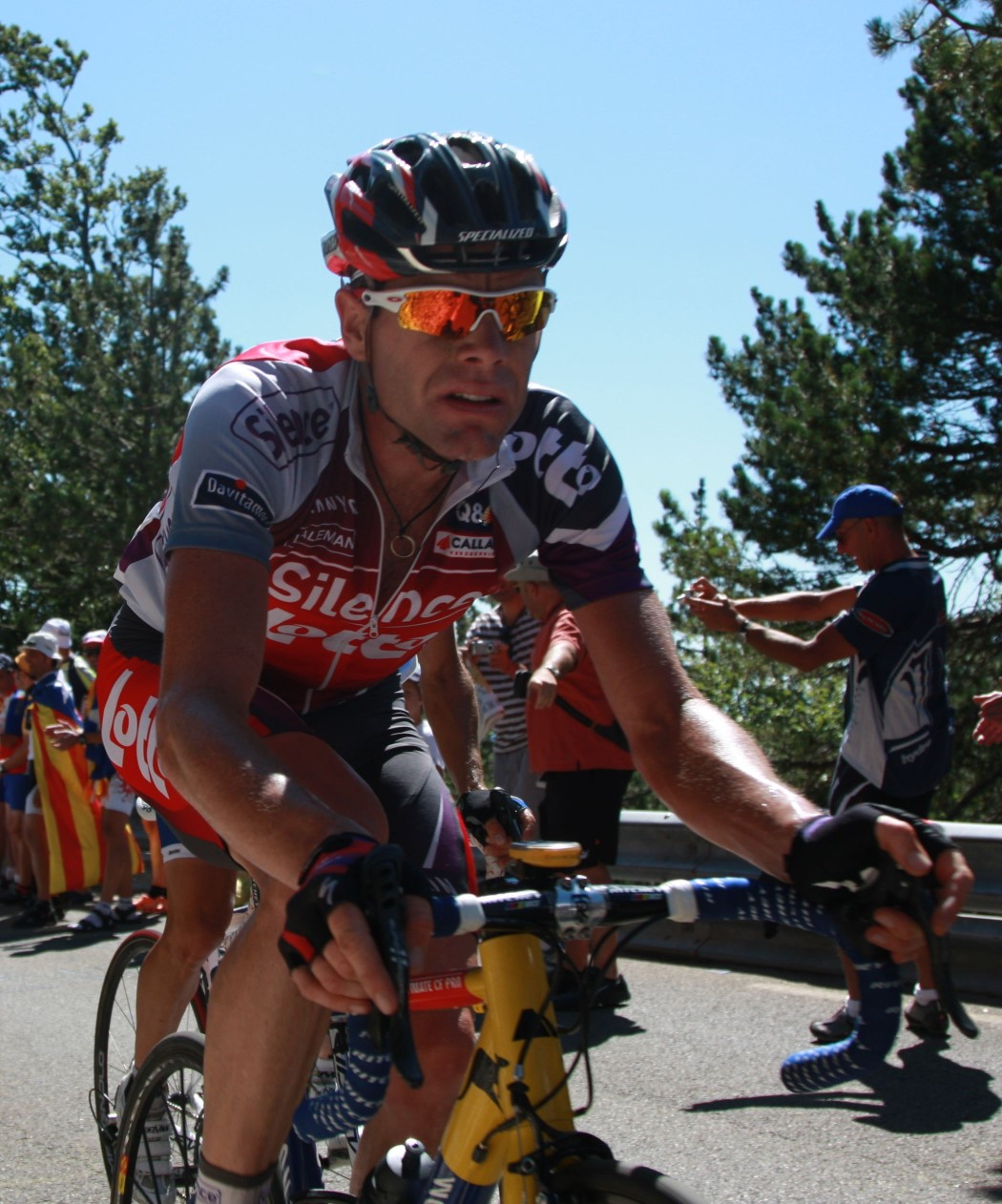
Evans at the 2009 Tour de France

In 2009, Evans won the Settimana Internazionale di Coppi e Bartali Critérium du Dauphiné Libéré. A combination of poor team support and poor form hampered his Tour de France campaign and he was only able to finish in 30th place, 45 minutes behind winner Contador. Evans finished third overall in the Vuelta a España, during which he wore the gold leader's jersey for a day, although his race was marred by mechanical failure in the way up the Sierra Nevada mountain finish. Evans joined an elite group of cyclists who have all worn all three leaders jerseys; the pink jersey for the leader of the general classification in the Giro d'Italia in 2002, the yellow jersey for the leader of the general classification in the Tour de France for 4 days in the 2008 Tour de France, and the gold jersey for the leader of the general classification in the Vuelta a España.

Evans went on to win the road race at the UCI Road World Championships in Mendrisio, Switzerland on 27 September. He was awarded Australian Cyclist of the Year for the third time.

=== BMC Racing Team (2010–15) ===
There was much speculation at the end of the 2009 season of Evans looking for a new team to better support him at the 2010 Tour de France. After Evans became world champion he seemed to commit himself fully to helping teammate Philippe Gilbert. To many, this was evidence of a happier relationship between Evans and Silence–Lotto. However, it was then revealed that Evans was to depart the team, who cited his reason for leaving as "to look for new challenges".

==== 2010 ====
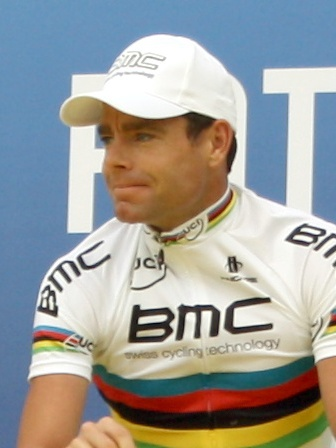
Evans at the 2010 Tour de France team presentation

In 2010, Evans moved to the BMC Racing Team. He had success in La Flèche Wallonne and he led the general classification after Stage 2 of the Giro d'Italia. Evans won stage seven of the race with a dominating sprint from the front of a small group, after resisting numerous attacks from Alexander Vinokourov in the final 10 kilometres (6.2 mi). This stage was later dubbed as "the mud stage", since it was raining profusely and the path of the race was going through dirt roads, resulting in unrecognisable riders. Evans finished the Giro 5th overall, winning the points classification and the Azzurri d'Italia classification. Evans also held the yellow jersey for stage nine of the Tour de France while riding with a hairline fracture in his left elbow caused during a crash in the previous stage. He lost significant time to the leaders during stage nine, which lost him the yellow jersey and put him out of serious contention for overall victory. He ended the tour in 26th place, 50 minutes and 27 seconds behind Alberto Contador.

==== 2011 ====
Evans had a much more successful start to 2011, winning stage 4 and the general classification at Tirreno–Adriatico, and the general classification at the Tour de Romandie, both of which formed part of the UCI World Tour. Skipping the Giro d'Italia, Evans prepared for the Tour de France by finishing as runner-up in the Criterium du Dauphine, one of the major Tour warm up events. This was the fourth consecutive Dauphine that Evans entered where he finished in 2nd.

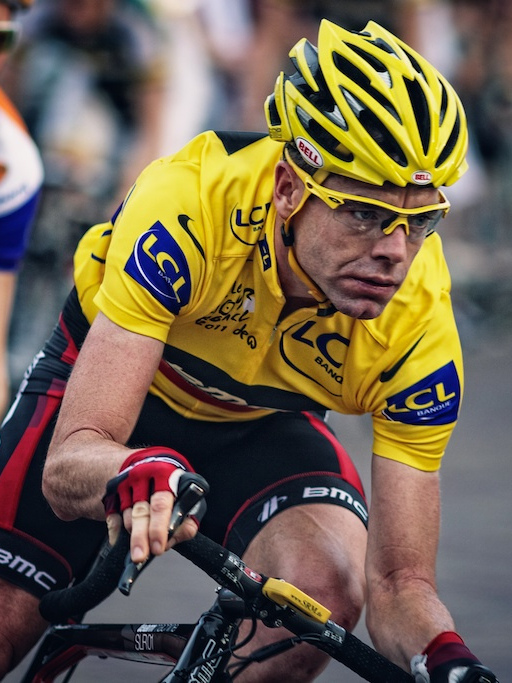
Evans wearing the yellow jersey during a Criterium in Surhuisterveen after the 2011 Tour de France

Evans finished second on stage one of the Tour de France, and won stage 4, the third Tour de France stage win of his career. Evans then led the mountains classification after stage 4 for a single day. As the Tour de France continued Evans was looked upon often to chase down breakaways in order to preserve his position in the top 5 of the general classification and in order to maintain time gaps that he believed he could strategically make up in the individual time trial of stage 20. During stage 19, Evans was forced to chase an early breakaway containing the general classification contenders and led by Alberto Contador, who at the time was seeking his 4th Tour de France win. However, he experienced mechanical trouble and was forced to change bikes. He again led the peloton to pull back the contender group, keeping himself within striking distance for overall victory by remaining just under a minute behind Andy Schleck. On the time trial, the last stage before Paris, Evans took the lead of the general classification by 1' 34" after finishing close second in the stage, beating previous race leader Schleck by 2' 31". With the win he became the first Australian to win the Tour de France, the second non-European to have officially won it, and the oldest to win the overall general classification in the post-war era.

Evans' win elicited much celebration in his home nation with calls for a national holiday as his win was compared to that of the 1983 America's Cup which was considered Australia's greatest sporting achievement. Australian Prime Minister Julia Gillard phoned to congratulate Evans saying that "I do want to say a very big congratulations to Cadel Evans. I had the opportunity this morning to speak and to personally offer my congratulations. I believe I disturbed him while he was trying to get a nice, hot bath." Evans said immediately following the tour that he was unsure of how his win would be received in Australia, saying "I haven't had time to consider that aspect, to be honest. It's been a long, long process and it will take a long time to realise what it means. A few people always believed in me and they're the people that matter the most. We did it. It's been a real pleasure these past three weeks." At a homecoming parade held on his return to Australia, tens of thousands of people turned out, many dressed in yellow and waving yellow flags, in Melbourne's Federation Square. A state reception was held in his honour.

==== 2012 ====
In March, Evans won the overall classification of the 2.HC Critérium International, a three-stage race. He was victorious on the second stage, a 6.5-kilometre (4.0-mile) individual time trial, and held on to his lead in the final stage, grabbing the Points classification jersey. Evans also took a prestigious victory on stage 1 of the Critérium du Dauphiné after attacking on the last descent, catching and out sprinting the two men who were at the front of the race, Jérôme Coppel (Saur–Sojasun) and Andrey Kashechkin (Astana). Evans finished in third position in the general classification, with the points classification jersey on his shoulders.

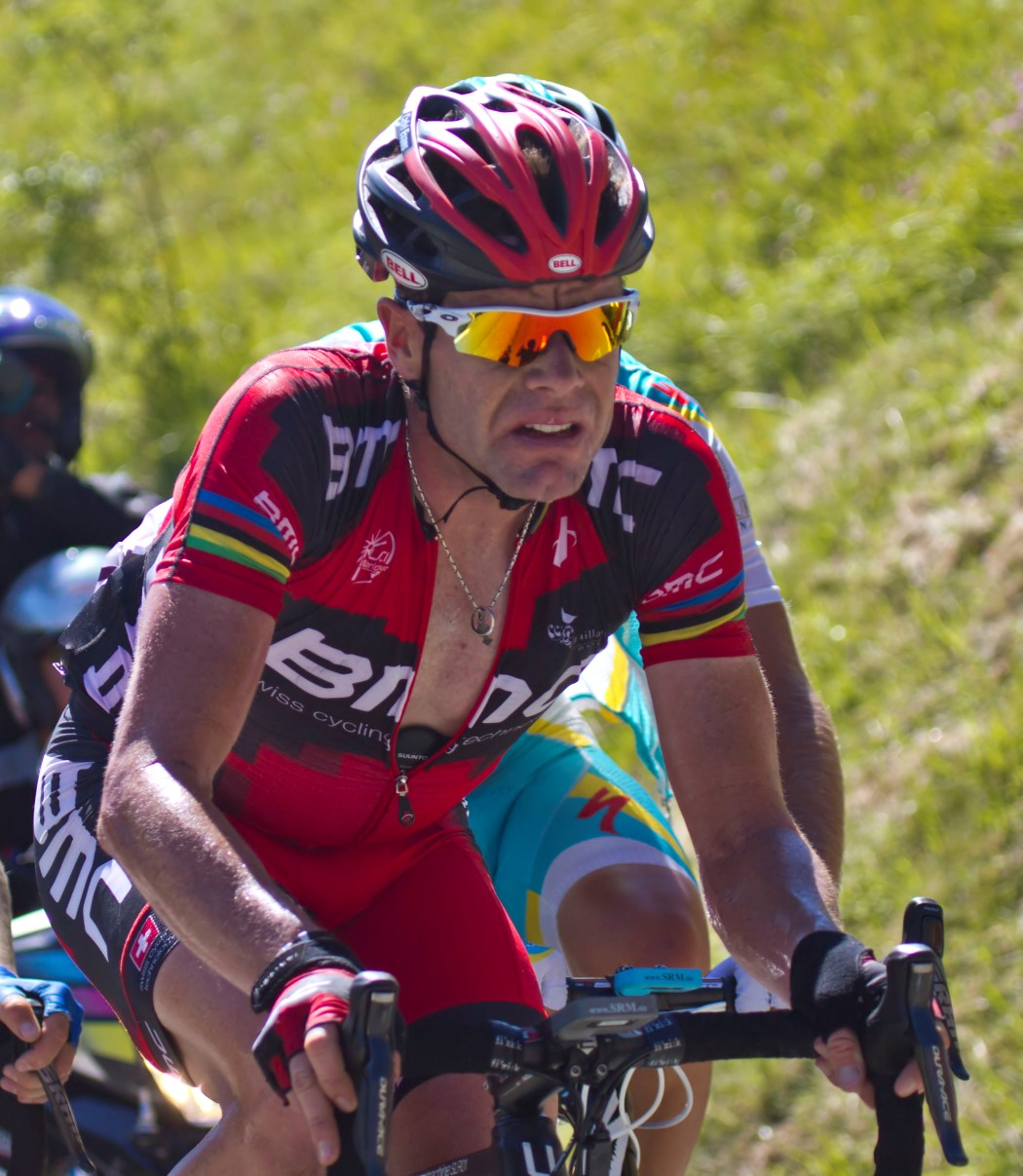
Evans at the 2012 Tour de France

Evans started the Tour de France with high hopes of a repeat performance from 2011. On stage 7, Evans showed great form by finishing second atop La Planche des Belles Filles, registering the same time as rival Bradley Wiggins of Team Sky, the latter grabbing the yellow jersey. Evans then lost a substantial amount of time on the ninth stage individual time trial, coming in sixth place with a deficit of one minute and forty-three seconds on the winner Wiggins. He suffered another setback in the high mountain stage from Albertville to La Toussuire-Les Sybelles (stage 11), where he tried a daring attack with teammate Tejay van Garderen 7 kilometres (4.3 miles) away from the summit of the Col de la Croix de Fer with almost 60 km (37.3 mi) to go in the race. The attempted escape failed and he was subsequently dropped on the slopes leading to La Toussuire, being unable to follow the pace set by Chris Froome. He lost another minute and 26 seconds to the race leader. Stage 14 saw Evans puncture three times as tacks had been thrown on the road, with Team Sky calling a temporary halt to the racing on the descent. As BMC Racing Team riders brought Evans back from his predicament to rejoin the bunch, they saluted Team Sky's car as they crossed the convoy to thank them for the gesture of sportsmanship. Evans dropped out of contention on stage 16, where he lost contact with the leaders on the penultimate climb, was paced back by teammates on the descent only to be dropped again on the Col de Peyresourde. He slipped to seventh overall, and behind van Garderen. Evans lost further time on the last time trial to Chartres, where he was overtaken on the road by van Garderen, despite setting out three minutes ahead of him; he cited illness to explain his performance. He finished the Tour in seventh position, 15 minutes and 49 seconds down on winner Wiggins and stated that he would be back as BMC's leader in 2013.

Evans was selected in the Australian teams for the road race and time trial at the London Olympics. However, after making no impact in the road race, Evans withdrew from the time trial citing fatigue. A couple of weeks later, he cancelled his scheduled participation to the Québec and Montréal World Tour races, stating that he was putting an end to his 2012 racing season because he was exhausted and did not want to compromise his 2013 campaign.

==== 2013 ====
Evans' 2013 season came to a good start after finishing third in the Tour of Oman in presence of a strong field. His strategy that year was to ride both the Giro d'Italia and the Tour de France. In April, he placed eighth in the Giro del Trentino, a short stage race he rode in preparation for the Italian Grand Tour. The Giro d'Italia featured cold and wet weather, leading Bicycling magazine to call it "one of the more grueling Grand Tours in recent memory." Despite the difficulties, Evans was posted in second position for a long time behind overall classification leader Vincenzo Nibali. He lost his second place on the last mountain stage, climbing to Tre Cime di Lavaredo, which was hindered by snowfall. He still managed to finish third in the general classification. Evans was the designated leader of his team in the Tour de France, but he encountered major difficulties as he was constantly dropped from the leading group in mountainous stages. His teammate Tejay van Garderen sacrificed his overall chances to help him in key stages, but to no avail. The Tour concluded in a major disappointment for Team BMC, as Evans took 39th place and Van Garderen finished 45th while Briton Chris Froome won the overall classification.

==== 2014–2015 ====
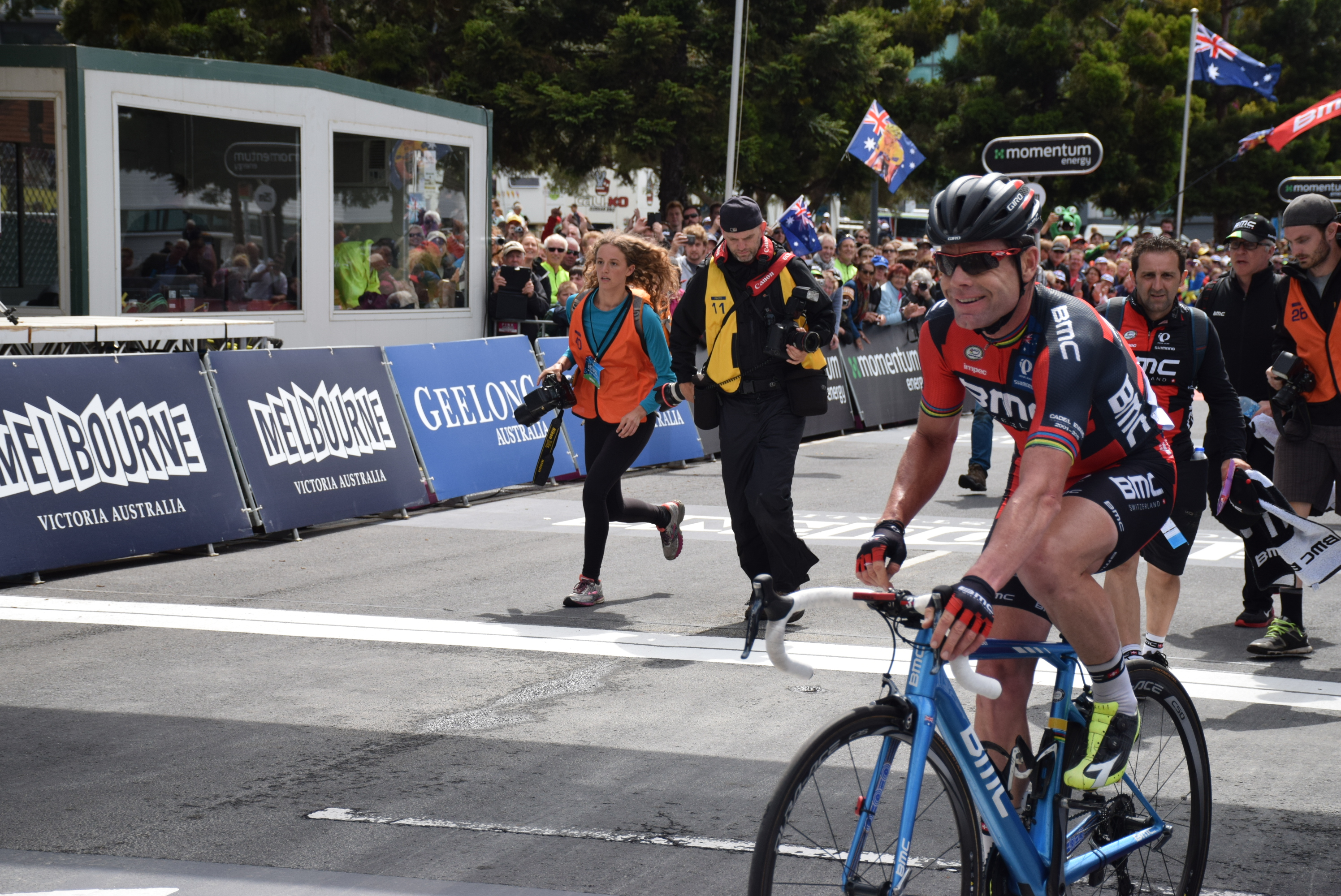
Evans during the 2015 Cadel Evans Great Ocean Road Race

In September 2014, Evans announced that he would retire in February 2015. Evans participated in the inaugural Cadel Evans Great Ocean Road Race in 2015, finishing fifth. Evans then became the Global Ambassador for the BMC Racing Team.

== Personal life ==
In 2005, Evans married Chiara Passerini, an Italian pianist and music teacher he met at the end of 2002. Evans proposed to her after his first Tour de France. In January 2012, the couple adopted their son Robel, from Ethiopia, at the age of six months. Evans and Passerini separated in 2015. Since 2015 he has been dating Stefania Zandonella, a ski Instructor from Italy. Their son Aidan was born in 2019.

Cadel's grandfather was from Wales, and so he was named "Cadel" in honour of three Welsh kings.

Evans’ first cousin is Australian London 2012 Paralympian Matthew Haanappel.

Evans’ current Australian home is Barwon Heads, Victoria. He resides in Stabio, Switzerland when in Europe.

Evans was made a Member (AM) in the General Division of the Order of Australia on 10 June 2013.

Evans supports the Geelong Cats in the Australian Football League. A biography, Cadel Evans: Close To Flying, was published by Hardie Grant Books in November 2009.

=== Philanthropy and political views ===
Winning The Sydney Morning Herald 2007 Sports Performer of the Year, Evans pledged to donate his $50,000 winner's prize to charity, including the Amy Gillett Foundation, established in memory of Australian rower and cyclist Amy Gillett, who was killed on the eve of a stage race in Germany in 2005, when she and her Australian teammates were struck by a car. Another nominated beneficiary was Ian Thorpe's Fountain for Youth, established by the Olympic swimmer to alleviate and treat illness and disease in people under 20. Making the announcement, Evans revealed that Thorpe had visited the Northern Territory Aboriginal community of Barunga where Evans lived until the age of three.

In 2008, Evans wore a cycling undershirt with the Flag of Tibet and supported freedom for Tibet. He said:

"Trying to bring awareness of the Tibet movement is something someone in my position can do. I just feel really sorry for them. They don't harm anyone and they are getting their culture taken away from them. I don't want to see a repeat of what happened to Aboriginal culture [in Australia] happen to another culture."

In support of youth mental health initiatives of Orygen Youth Health, Evans has featured in the annual Suit Up & Ride corporate team cycling event in Melbourne since 2010.

== Career achievements ==
=== Major results ===
==== Road ====
1995
3rd Time trial, UCI World Junior Championships
1998
6th Overall À travers Lausanne
7th Overall Giro del Friuli-Venezia Giulia
9th Time trial, UCI World Under-23 Championships
1999
1st Overall Tour of Tasmania

1st Stage 3

1st Young rider classification, Tour Down Under
2001 (3 pro wins)
1st Overall Tour of Austria

1st Stage 4

1st Overall Brixia Tour
1st À travers Lausanne
2nd Japan Cup
6th Giro dell'Appennino
8th Overall Bayern–Rundfahrt
9th Giro dell'Emilia
10th Overall Tour Down Under
2002 (2)
Commonwealth Games

1st Time trial
2nd Road race

3rd Overall Settimana Internazionale di Coppi e Bartali

1st Stage 1

3rd Overall Tour de Romandie
4th Overall Tour Down Under

1st Mountains classification
1st Stage 5

6th Overall Tour of the Basque Country
6th Overall Uniqa Classic

1st Stage 4

8th Gran Premio di Chiasso
10th Overall Paris–Nice
Giro d'Italia

Held after Stage 15–16

2003
8th Overall Vuelta a Murcia
10th Overall Tour Down Under

1st Mountains classification

2004 (2)
1st Overall Tour of Austria

1st Stage 2

3rd Overall Vuelta a Murcia
4th Milano–Torino
4th Giro di Lombardia
5th Overall Regio-Tour
2005 (1)
4th Road race, National Championships
5th Overall Deutschland Tour

1st Stage 7

5th Liège–Bastogne–Liège
8th Overall Paris–Nice
8th Overall Tour de France
9th La Flèche Wallonne
2006 (2)
1st Overall Tour de Romandie

1st Stage 5 (ITT)

1st Mountains classification, Tour Down Under
2nd Overall Tour de Pologne
4th Overall Tour de France
7th Overall Tour of California
8th Overall Tour of the Basque Country
10th Overall Settimana Internazionale di Coppi e Bartali
10th Overall Tour de Suisse
10th Overall Danmark Rundt
2007 (1)
1st UCI ProTour
1st Stage 2 (ITT) Test Event Beijing 2008
1st Stage 1b (TTT) Settimana Internazionale di Coppi e Bartali
2nd Overall Tour de France

1st Stage 13 (ITT)

2nd Overall Critérium du Dauphiné Libéré
4th Overall Vuelta a España
4th Overall Tour de Romandie
5th Road race, UCI World Championships
6th Giro dell'Emilia
6th Giro di Lombardia
7th Overall Paris–Nice
2008 (4)
1st Overall Settimana Internazionale di Coppi e Bartali

1st Stage 3

1st Stage 4 Paris–Nice
2nd Overall Tour de France

Held after Stages 10–14

2nd Overall Tour of the Basque Country
2nd Overall Critérium du Dauphiné Libéré
2nd La Flèche Wallonne
3rd Overall Vuelta a Andalucía

1st Stage 2

5th Time trial, Olympic Games
6th Giro dell'Emilia
7th Liège–Bastogne–Liège
2009 (3)
1st Road race, UCI World Championships
2nd Overall Settimana Internazionale di Coppi e Bartali

1st Stage 5

2nd Overall Critérium du Dauphiné Libéré

1st Points classification
1st Stage 1 (ITT)

3rd Overall Vuelta a España

Held after Stage 7
Held after Stages 7–10

4th Overall Tour of the Basque Country
4th Giro dell'Emilia
5th UCI World Ranking
5th La Flèche Wallonne
7th Overall Tour de Romandie
10th Giro di Lombardia
2010 (2)
1st La Flèche Wallonne
3rd Overall Tirreno–Adriatico
3rd Grand Prix de Wallonie
4th UCI World Ranking
4th Gran Premio dell'Insubria-Lugano
4th Liège–Bastogne–Liège
5th Overall Giro d'Italia

1st Points classification
1st Stage 7
Held after Stage 1

6th Overall Tour Down Under
6th Overall Critérium International
Tour de France

Held after Stage 8

2011 (5)
1st Overall Tour de France

1st Stage 4
Held after Stages 4–5

1st Overall Tirreno–Adriatico

1st Stage 6

1st Overall Tour de Romandie
2nd UCI World Tour
2nd Overall Critérium du Dauphiné
7th Overall USA Pro Cycling Challenge
7th Overall Volta a Catalunya
2012 (3)
1st Overall Critérium International

1st Points classification
1st Stage 2 (ITT)

3rd Overall Critérium du Dauphiné

1st Points classification
1st Stage 1

7th Overall Tour de France
2013 (1)
1st Stage 4 Tour of Alberta
3rd Overall Giro d'Italia

Held after Stages 9–11

3rd Overall Tour of Oman
8th Overall Giro del Trentino
2014 (5)
1st Overall Giro del Trentino

1st Stages 1 (TTT) & 3

2nd Road race, National Championships
2nd Overall Tour Down Under

1st Stage 3

5th Overall Tour du Haut Var
6th Overall Tour of Utah

1st Stages 6 & 7

7th Overall Tour of the Basque Country
7th Strade Bianche
8th Overall Giro d'Italia

Held after Stages 8–11

2015
3rd Overall Tour Down Under
5th Cadel Evans Great Ocean Road Race

===== General classification results timeline =====
Grand Tour general classification results
Grand Tour	2002	2003	2004	2005	2006	2007	2008	2009	2010	2011	2012	2013	2014
Giro d'Italia	14	—	—	—	—	—	—	—	5	—	—	3	8
Tour de France	—	—	—	8	4	2	2	30	23	1	7	39	—
/ Vuelta a España	—	DNF	60	—	—	4	—	3	—	—	—	—	52
Major stage race general classification results
Race	2002	2003	2004	2005	2006	2007	2008	2009	2010	2011	2012	2013	2014
Paris–Nice	10	—	—	8	—	7	16	21	—	—	—	—	—
/ Tirreno–Adriatico	—	—	—	—	—	—	—	—	3	1	32	22	DNF
Volta a Catalunya	—	—	—	—	37	—	—	—	—	7	—	—	—
Tour of the Basque Country	6	34	57	15	8	13	2	4	—	—	—	—	7
Tour de Romandie	3	—	—	—	1	4	—	7	—	1	29	—	—
Critérium du Dauphiné	—	—	—	—	—	2	2	2	—	2	3	—	—
Tour de Suisse	—	—	—	15	10	—	—	—	—	—	—	—	11

===== Classics results timeline =====
Monument	1999	2000	2001	2002	2003	2004	2005	2006	2007	2008	2009	2010	2011	2012	2013	2014
Milan–San Remo	Did not contest during his career															
Tour of Flanders	Did not contest during his career															
Paris–Roubaix	Did not contest during his career															
Liège–Bastogne–Liège	—	—	—	37	—	—	5	80	36	7	16	4	—	—	—	—
Giro di Lombardia	—	—	33	—	—	4	DNF	55	6	26	10	DNF	—	—	—	25
Classic	1999	2000	2001	2002	2003	2004	2005	2006	2007	2008	2009	2010	2011	2012	2013	2014
Strade Bianche	Race did not exist								—	—	—	55	30	DNF	28	7
Amstel Gold Race	—	—	—	—	DNF	—	—	—	—	—	66	13	—	DNF	—	—
La Flèche Wallonne	—	—	—	74	—	—	9	122	29	2	5	1	—	—	—	—
Clásica de San Sebastián	—	—	—	41	—	—	15	121	—	—	—	—	—	—	—	—
Giro dell'Emilia	27	—	9	—	—	—	—	—	6	6	4	—	—	—	—	—
Milano–Torino	—	—	18	—	—	4	—	—	—	Not held				—	—	—

===== Major championships timeline =====
Event		2001	2002	2003	2004	2005	2006	2007	2008	2009	2010	2011	2012	2013	2014	2015
Olympic Games	Time trial	Not held			—	Not held			5	Not held			—	Not held		
Olympic Games	Road race	Not held			—	Not held			14	Not held			80	Not held		
World Championships	Time trial	—	—	—	—	—	—	—	—	—	—	—	—	—	—	—
World Championships	Road race	26	—	—	DNF	DNF	40	5	—	1	17	—	—	DNF	DNF	—
National Championships	Time trial	—	—	—	—	—	—	—	—	—	—	—	—	—	—	—
National Championships	Road race	—	—	—	—	4	—	—	—	—	—	—	—	—	2	11

Legend
—	Did not compete
DNF	Did not finish

==== Mountain bike ====
1993
1st Cross-country, National Youth Championships
1994
1st Cross-country, National Junior Championships
2nd Cross-country, UCI World Junior Championships
1995
3rd Cross-country, UCI World Junior Championships
1996
1st Cross-country, National Championships
3rd Cross-country, UCI World Under-23 Championships
9th Cross-country, Olympic Games
1997
1st Cross-country, National Championships
2nd Cross-country, UCI World Under-23 Championships
3rd Overall UCI Cross-country World Cup

1st Wellington
1st Vail
2nd Sankt Wendel
2nd Budapest

1998
1st Overall UCI Cross-country World Cup

1st Silves
1st Plymouth
1st Canmore
2nd Sankt Wendel
3rd Bromont

1st Sea Otter Classic
1999
1st Overall UCI Cross-country World Cup

1st Madrid
2nd Napa Valley
2nd Sydney
2nd Big Bear Lake
2nd Canmore

1st Sea Otter Classic
2nd Cross-country, UCI World Under-23 Championships
3rd Houffalize, Vayamundo MTB Cup
2000
UCI Cross-country World Cup

1st Mont-Sainte-Anne
1st Canmore

3rd Cross-country, National Championships
7th Cross-country, Olympic Games
2001
2nd Team relay, UCI World Championships
2nd Cross-country, National Championships
UCI Cross-country World Cup

2nd Kaprun
3rd Grouse Mountain

2017
1st Overall Masters Cape Epic (with George Hincapie)

=== Awards and honours ===
Evans is a four-time winner of the Sir Hubert Opperman Trophy (2006, 2007, 2009, 2011), awarded to the Australian cyclist of the year. On 10 June 2013, Evans was honoured as a Member (AM) in the General Division of the Order of Australia. In 2020, Evans was inducted into the Sport Australia Hall of Fame.
