= Myles Rockwell =

American mountain biker (born 1972)

Personal information
- Born: August 19, 1972 (age 54) Durango, Colorado, U.S.

Cycling career
- Sport: Cycling
- Current team: Retired
- Discipline: Downhill
- Role: Rider

Professional teams
- 1993: Yeti
- 1994-1998: Volvo-Cannondale
- 1999-2000: Giant

Major wins
- Mammoth Kamikaze (1995); Reebok Eliminator (1993, 1995); Kaprun UCI MTB-Downhill Worldcup (1995)
Medal record
Representing United States
Mountain bike racing
World Championships
Gold medal – first place	2000 Sierra Nevada	Downhill
Bronze medal – third place	1993 Métabief	Downhill

Myles Rockwell (born August 19, 1972) is an American former professional downhill mountain biker and winner of the 2000 UCI Downhill World Championships. He was inducted into the Mountain Bike Hall of Fame in 2019 and into the U.S. Bicycling Hall of Fame in 2021. In 2004 Rockwell was arrested for growing Marijuana, he was released on $10,000 bail.

== Career ==
After racing for Yeti Cycles in 1993 and his victory at the Reebook Eliminator in Mammoth Lakes and the 3rd place in the UCI Downhill World Championships, Rockwell joined the newly formed Volvo Cannondale Mountain Bike Racing Team in 1994 together with the downhill riders Missy Giove and Franck Roman. Rockwell played a vital role in the development and testing of mountain bikes and components. In the 1994 season, Rockwell used a Cannondale Super V full suspension bike with its original high-pivot design and approximately 75 mm of travel on the rear wheel, and either a prototype Cannondale Headshok or a Rock Shox suspension fork. In 1995, Cannondale engineers, Rockwell and his teammates presented the downhill scene with the Cannondale Super V DH Active offering 152 mm of travel in the rear and 114 mm in front with the Cannondale Moto fork. This bike was the beginning of "super-long" suspension travel for mountain bike downhill. It was also one of the first professional race bikes with disc brakes. Rockwell was forced to take a break from racing due to injuries in 1996 and 1997. Rockwell was part of the development of the Cannondale Super V DHF / Fulcrum, a team-only downhill mountain bike with a virtual-pivot point and three chains for optimized pedaling efficiency and an adjustable head tube angle. Rockwell's 1998 Fulcrum is on display in the Marin Museum of Bicycling. In his last two seasons as a professional athlete, 1999 and 2000, Rockwell raced for Giant Bicycles. He was the first World Champion after 5 consecutive victories of Nicolas Vouilloz, a ten times downhill world champion and one of the most successful professional mountain bikers in history. Rockwell is the last male U.S. American winner of a Downhill World Championships. In 2005, Rockwell won the first edition of the Red Bull Road Rage.

== Personal life ==
Rockwell is married to Willow Rockwell (née Koerber), a retired professional cross-country mountain bike racer and world championships bronze medalist. In 2019, the couple created The Rockwell Ridewell Foundation, a 501(c)(3) organization for youth development.

Rockwell is co-founder of a biking school in Boulder, CO.
