= Jan Østergaard =

Danish cyclist

Jan Erik Østergaard
Personal information
- Full name: Jan Erik Østergaard
- Born: 20 February 1961 (age 65) Vejle, Denmark

Cycling career
- Sport: Cycling
- Current team: Retired
- Disciplines: Road; Cross-country; Cyclo-cross
- Role: Rider

Professional teams
- 1986: Roland–Van de Ven
- 1987: Hitachi–Marc
- 1988: Isoglass–EVS–Robland
- 1999: Team Fakta
Medal record
Representing Denmark
Men's mountain bike racing
World Championships
Bronze medal – third place	1993 Métabief	Cross-country
Bronze medal – third place	1995 Kirchzarten	Cross-country

Jan Erik Østergaard (born 20 February 1961) is a Danish former road cyclist and cross-country mountain biker. He competed in the men's cross-country mountain biking event at the 1996 Summer Olympics. He also rode in the 1988 Giro d'Italia, finishing 119th overall.

== Major results ==
=== Road ===
1991
2nd Grand Prix OST Manufaktur
3rd Grand Prix de Waregem
1992
1st Overall Flèche du Sud
1993
3rd Grand Prix OST Manufaktur
1996
2nd Grand Prix Herning
1998
1st Overall Flèche du Sud
2000
3rd Overall Flèche du Sud
3rd Grand Prix OST Manufaktur

=== Mountain bike ===
1993
3rd UCI World XCO Championships
3rd National XCO Championships
1995
1st National XCO Championships
3rd UCI World XCO Championships
3rd Overall UCI XCO World Cup

1st Budapest
1st Plymouth

1997
3rd National XCO Championships
1998
3rd National XCO Championships

=== Cyclo-cross ===
1984
3rd National Championships
1985
2nd National Championships
1990
1st Grand Prix Möbel Alvisse
1992
3rd National Championships
1993
2nd National Championships
