= Roland Green (cyclist) =

Canadian cyclist

Personal information
- Full name: Roland Green
- Born: July 29, 1974 (age 52) Victoria, British Columbia, Canada

Cycling career
- Sport: Cycling
- Disciplines: MTB XC & Road
- Role: Rider

Professional teams
- 1999-2000: Team GT
- 2001-2004: Trek-Volkswagen
- 2005: Kona Les Gets Factory Team

Major wins
- Mountain bike World XC Championships (2001, 2002)
Medal record
Representing Canada
Men's mountain bike racing
World Championships
Gold medal – first place	2001 Vail	Cross Country
Gold medal – first place	2002 Kaprun	Cross Country
Silver medal – second place	2000 Sierra Nevada	Cross Country
Commonwealth Games
Gold medal – first place	2002 Manchester	Cross-country

Roland Green (born 29 July 1974 in Victoria, British Columbia) is a retired Canadian mountain bike and road bicycle racer. Green was a member of the Canadian Olympic Mountain Bike Racing Team for the 2000 Summer Olympics, held in Sydney, Australia. He was a Commonwealth gold medalist at the 2002 Commonwealth Games in Manchester, England, winning the MTB event on the same day as his birthday. Green dominated the world cup circuit of cross-country mountain biking from 2000 until 2003, becoming world champion in both 2001 and 2002. Roland also is the record holder of the Mount Doug Hill climb in his hometown of Victoria BC, Canada with a fast 4Min. 39sec which nobody has broken in 10 years. He was named VeloNews' Mountain Bike Man of the Year in 1999 and Canada's Male Cyclist of the Year in 2000. Green retired at the end of the 2005 racing season.

== Major results ==
1996
1st Cross-country, National Championships
4th Cross-country, UCI World Under-23 Championships
2nd Tour of Hawaii Time Trial
3rd Tour of Malaysia Road Race
1997
2nd Cross-country, National Championships
1998
1st Cross-country, National Championships
4th Overall, NORBA NCS
1999
1st Overall, NORBA NCS Short Track XC
1st Overall, NORBA Short Track Championship
3rd Overall, NORBA NCS
1st NORBA NCS #6, Mt. Snow, Vermont
2nd NORBA NCS #5, Deer Valley, Utah
3rd NORBA NCS #1, Snow Summit, California
2nd Tour of the Rockies, Colorado
1at Time Trial Stage, Tour of the Redlands
3rd Team relay, UCI World Championships
2000
2nd Cross-country, UCI World Championships
4th World Cup #1
1st Overall, Whistler International Classic Stage Race
2001
UCI World Championships

1st Cross-country
1st Team relay

1st Cross-country, National Championships
1st Overall UCI World Cup

1st Houffalize
1st Mont-Sainte-Anne
2nd Grouse Mountain
2nd Sarentino

1st Overall, NORBA NCS XC Series

1st NORBA NCS XC, Snowshoe, West Virginia
1st NORBA NCS XC, Mammoth, California
1st NORBA NCS XC, Mt. Snow, Vermont
2nd NORBA NCS XC, Big Bear, California

1st Overall, NORBA NC STXC Series

1st NORBA NCS STXC, Snowshoe, West Virginia
1st NORBA NCS STXC, Mammoth, California
1st NORBA NCS STXC, Mt. Snow, Vermont
3rd NORBA NCS STXC, Big Bear, California

2nd Overall, Sea Otter Classic, Monterey, California

1st Cross Country, Sea Otter Classic, Monterey, California

3rd Redlands Road Race, California
2002
1st Cross-country, UCI World Championships
1st Cross-country, Commonwealth Games
UCI World Cup

2nd Madrid
5th Houffalize
5th Les Gets

1st Norba NCS XC, Troy, Wisconsin
1st Norba NCS XC, Durango, Colorado
1st Norba NCS XC, Mt. Snow, Vermont
1st Norba NCS XC, Showshoe, West Virginia
1st Norba NCS STXC, Troy, Wisconsin
1st Norba NCS STXC, Mt. Snow, Vermont
3rd Norba NCS STXC, Snowshoe Mountain, West Virginia
2003
1st Cross-country, National Championships
1st NORBA NCS XC, Mt. Snow, Vermont
1st NORBA NCS XC, Sand Point, Idaho
1st Overall, Sea Otter Classic

1st Stage 1, Sea Otter Classic
1st Stage 3, Sea Otter Classic
1st Stage 4, Sea Otter Classic

2nd Overall, Subaru Nova Desert Classic

1st Stage 2, Subaru Nova Desert Classic
1st Stage 3, Subaru Nova Desert Classic

UCI World Cup

3rd Mont-Sainte-Anne

3rd NORBA NCS XC, Mt. Snow, Vermont
3rd Stage 2, Redlands Classic
4th Stage 4, Dodge Tour de Georgia
