= Indergand =

Indergand is a Swiss surname. Notable people with the surname include:

- Linda Indergand (born 1993), Swiss cyclist
- Reto Indergand (born 1991), Swiss cyclist
