= Margarita Fullana =

Spanish cyclist (born 1972)

Personal information
- Full name: Margarita Fullana Riera
- Born: 9 April 1972 (age 54) Sant Llorenç des Cardassar, Islas Baleares, Spain

Cycling career
- Sport: Cycling
- Discipline: Mountain bike racing
- Role: Rider
- Rider type: Cross-country

Major wins
- World Cross Country Champion Mountainbike 1999 1999 UCI Mountain Bike World Championships
Medal record
Women's mountain bike racing
Representing Spain
Olympic Games
| Bronze medal – third place | 2000 Sydney | Cross-country |
World Championships
| Bronze medal – third place | 1997 Château-d'Œx | Cross-country |
| Gold medal – first place | 1999 Åre | Cross-country |
| Gold medal – first place | 2000 Sierra Nevada | Cross-country |
| Gold medal – first place | 2008 Val di Sole | Cross-country |

Margarita Fullana Riera (born 9 April 1972), also known as Marga Fullana, is a Spanish mountain biker. She won the Bronze Medal in Women's Cross-Country Mountain Biking at the 2000 Summer Olympics.

In 2001 she received the Ramon Llull Award from the government of the Balearic Islands.
