= Marcel Gerritsen =

Dutch cyclist

Personal information
- Born: 6 January 1967 (age 59) Amersfoort, Netherlands

Cycling career
- Sport: Cycling
- Disciplines: Mountain bike; Cyclo-cross; Road
- Role: Rider
- Rider type: Cross-country
Medal record
Representing Netherlands
Men's mountain bike racing
World Championships
Silver medal – second place	1993 Métabief	Cross-country

Marcel Gerritsen (born 6 January 1967) is a Dutch former professional cross-country mountain biker and cyclo-cross cyclist. He won the silver medal in the cross-country at the 1993 UCI Mountain Bike World Championships.

== Major results ==
=== Cyclo-cross ===
1985
3nd National Junior Championships
1991
4th UCI Under-23 World Championships

=== Mountain bike ===
1993
2nd UCI World XCO Championships
1995
2nd National XCO Championships
7th European XCO Championships

=== Road ===
1992
2nd Vlaamse Pijl
