= Paola Pezzo =

Italian cyclist (born 1969)

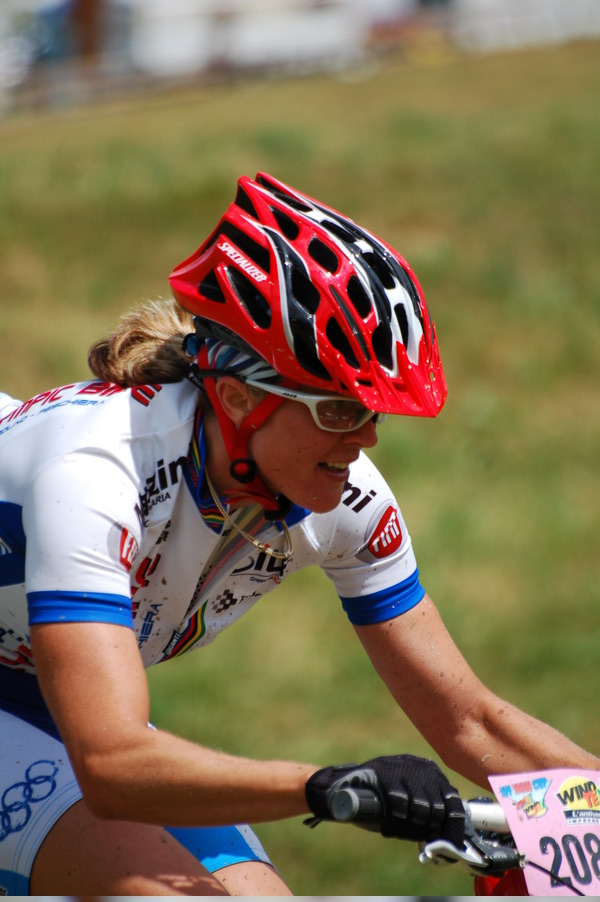

Personal information
- Full name: Paola Pezzo
- Born: 8 January 1969 (age 57) Bosco Chiesanuova, Italy

Cycling career
- Sport: Cycling
- Discipline: Mountain bike racing
- Role: Rider
- Rider type: Cross-country

Professional team
- Gary Fisher, Specialized Factory Team
Medal record
Women's mountain bike racing
Representing Italy
Olympic Games
Gold medal – first place	1996 Atlanta	Cross-country
Gold medal – first place	2000 Sydney	Cross-country
World Championships
Gold medal – first place	1993 Métabief	Cross-country
Gold medal – first place	1997 Château-d'Œx	Cross-country
Bronze medal – third place	1999 Åre	Cross-country
Bronze medal – third place	2000 Sierra Nevada	Cross-country

Paola Pezzo (born 8 January 1969, in Bosco Chiesanuova) is an Italian cross-country mountain bike racer from Verona. In 1996, in Atlanta, Georgia, in the U.S., she won the Olympic gold medal in mountain biking, when the event made its debut.

== Biography ==
Pezzo won the female World Mountain Bike Championship title in both 1993 and 1997. In 1997, she won the Grundig World Cup crown.

== Achievement ==
She won two gold medals. One in Atlanta '96 and the other in Sydney '00. She also won the mountain-bike championships in 1993 and 1997.

== See also ==
- Italian sportswomen multiple medalists at Olympics and World Championships
