= 1993 UCI Mountain Bike World Championships =

- Venue: Métabief, France
- Date: 17–18 September 1993

The 1993 UCI Mountain Bike World Championships were held in Métabief, France from 17 to 18 September 1993.

== Medal summary ==
=== Men's events ===
Event	Gold	Silver	Bronze
Cross-country	Henrik Djernis (DEN)	Marcel Gerritsen (NED)	Jan Erik Ostergaard (DEN)
Downhill	Mike King (USA)	Paolo Caramellino (ITA)	Myles Rockwell (USA)
Junior downhill	Nicolas Vouilloz (FRA)	Marcus Klausman (GER)	Karim Amour (FRA)

=== Women's events ===
Event	Gold	Silver	Bronze
Cross-country	Paola Pezzo (ITA)	Jeannie Longo (FRA)	Ruthie Matthes (USA)
Downhill	Giovanna Bonazzi (ITA)	Kim Sonier (USA)	Missy Giove (USA)
Junior downhill	Anne-Caroline Chausson (FRA)	Nolvenn le Caër (FRA)	Helen Mortimer (GBR)

=== Medal table ===
Rank	Nation	Gold	Silver	Bronze	Total
1	France (FRA)	2	2	1	5
2	Italy (ITA)	2	1	0	3
3	United States (USA)	1	1	3	5
4	Denmark (DEN)	1	0	1	2
5	Germany (GER)	0	1	1	2
6	Netherlands (NED)	0	1	0	1
Totals (6 entries)		6	6	6	18
