= Miguel Martinez (cyclist) =

French cyclist

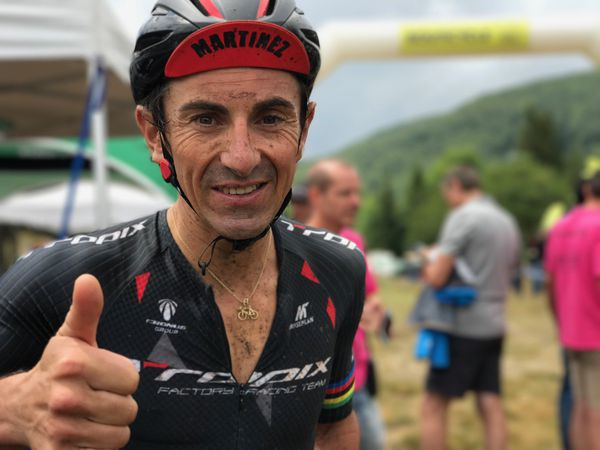

Personal information
- Full name: Miguel Martinez
- Nickname: Little Mig
- Born: 17 January 1976 (age 50) Fourchambault, France
- Height: 1.64 m (5 ft 5 in)
- Weight: 50 kg (110 lb)

Cycling career
- Sport: Cycling
- Disciplines: Road; Mountain bike racing; Cyclo-cross
- Role: Rider
- Rider type: Cross-country cycling

Amateur teams
- 2013: Montrichard Cyclisme 41
- 2015–2018: Montrichard Cyclisme 41
- 2017–2018: Team Tropix Factory Racing (MTB)
- 2019: Team Future Vélo powered by Panasonic ASF
- 2020: Montrichard Val de Cher Cyclisme

Professional teams
- 2002: Mapei–Quick-Step
- 2003: Phonak
- 2005: Commencal–Oxbow
- 2006: Maxxis–MSC
- 2008: Amore & Vita–McDonald's
- 2014: Tropix–FRM
- 2020: Amore & Vita–Prodir

Major wins
- Mountain bike Olympic Games XC (2000) World XC Championships (2000) XC World Cup (1997, 2000) 10 individual wins (1996, 1997, 1999–2001)
Medal record
Men's mountain bike racing
Representing France
Olympic Games
Gold medal – first place	2000 Sydney	Cross-country
Bronze medal – third place	1996 Atlanta	Cross-country
World Championships
Gold medal – first place	2000 Sierra Nevada	Cross-country
Silver medal – second place	1995 Kirchzarten	Cross-country
Silver medal – second place	1999 Åre	Cross-country

Miguel Martinez (born 17 January 1976 in Fourchambault, Nièvre) is a French road cyclist and cross-country mountain biker, who most recently rode for UCI Continental team Amore & Vita–Prodir. He won the gold medal at the 2000 Summer Olympics in Sydney, Australia after having finished in third place in the inaugural event at the 1996 Summer Olympics. He also rode in the 2002 Tour de France, finishing 44th. His brother Yannick, father Mariano and uncle Martin were also professional cyclists. He is also the father of racing cyclist Lenny Martinez.

== Major results ==
=== Mountain bike ===
1994
1st Cross-country, UEC European Junior Championships
1st Cross-country, UCI World Junior Championships
1995
2nd Cross-country, UCI World Championships
1996
1st Cross-country, National Championships
2nd Overall UCI XC World Cup

1st Helen
1st Bromont
1st Kristiansand

2nd Cross-country, UCI World Under-23 Championships
3rd Cross-country, Olympic Games
1997
1st Cross-country, UCI World Under-23 Championships
1st Overall UCI XC World Cup

1st Spindleruv Mlyn
1st Mont Sainte-Anne
1st Houffalize

1st Cross-country, UEC European Under-23 Championships
1st Roc d'Azur
2nd Cross-country, National Championships
1998
1st Cross-country, UCI World Under-23 Championships
2nd Overall UCI XC World Cup
2nd Roc d'Azur
1999
1st Cross-country, UEC European Championships
2nd Cross-country, UCI World Championships
2nd Overall UCI XC World Cup

1st Napa Valley

2nd Cross-country, National Championships
2nd Roc d'Azur
2000
1st Cross-country, Olympic Games
1st Cross-country, UCI World Championships
1st Overall UCI XC World Cup

1st Sarntal-Sarentino

2001
2nd Overall UCI XC World Cup

1st Sarntal-Sarentino
1st Leysin

2003
2nd Cross-country, National Championships
2nd Roc d'Azur
2004
1st Roc d'Azur
2008
1st Sea Otter Classic
2013
1st Roc d'Azur
1st Sea Otter Classic
2nd Cross-country, National Championships
2017
1st Marathon, National Championships

=== Cyclo-cross ===
1993
1st National Junior Championships
3rd UCI World Junior Championships
1994
1st National Junior Championships
1996
1st UCI World Under-23 Championships
1st National Under-23 Championships
1998
1st National Under-23 Championships
1st Overall Challenge la France
2000
3rd National Championships
2001
3rd National Championships

=== Road ===
2002
1st Stage 3 Vuelta a Navarra
2008
1st Stage 3 Tour de Beauce
