= Florian Vogel (cyclist) =

Swiss cyclist

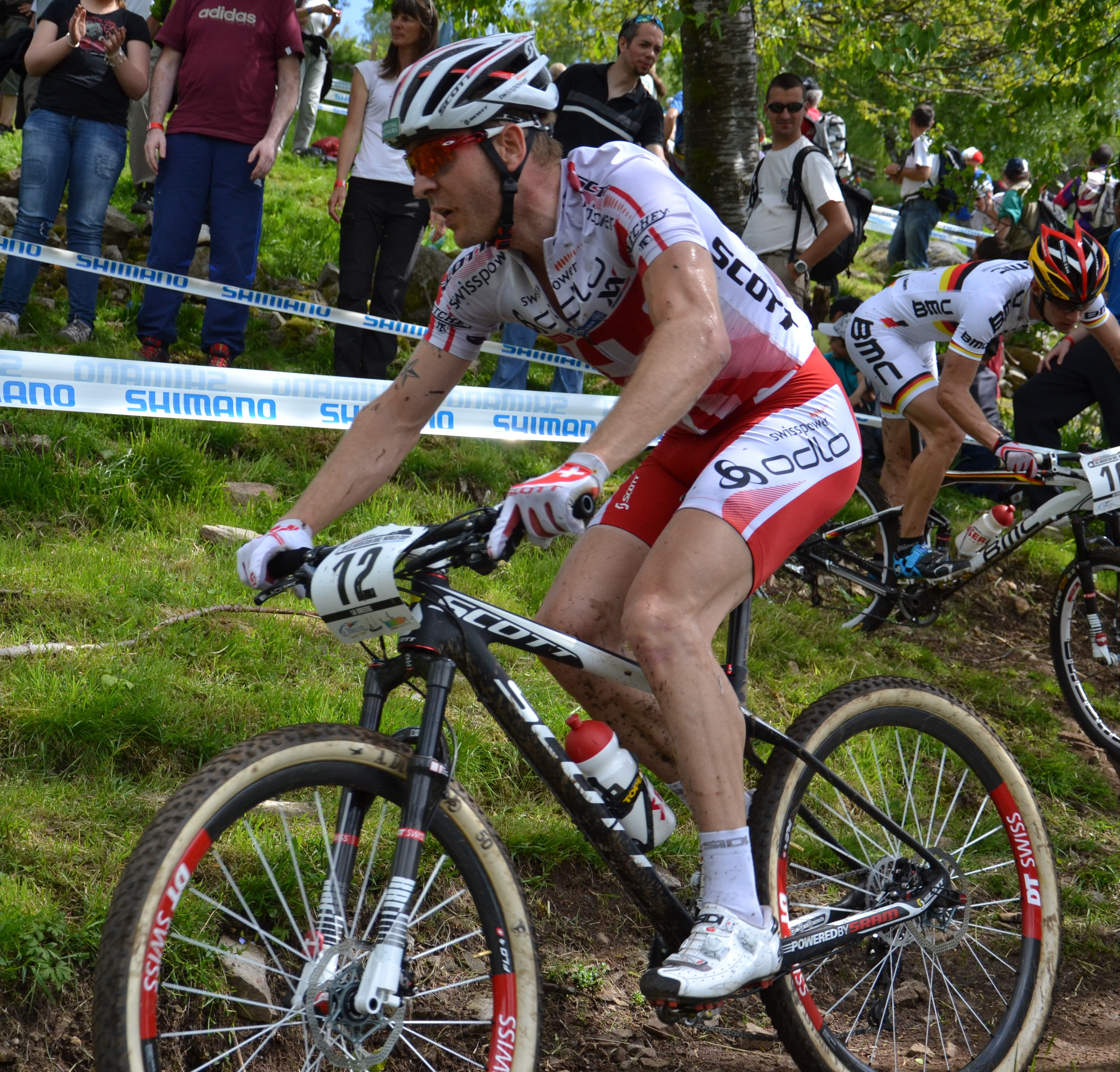
- Vogel in the UCI MTB World Cup race in La Bresse (2012)

Personal information
- Full name: Florian Vogel
- Born: 18 February 1982 (age 44) Aarau, Switzerland

Cycling career
- Sport: Cycling
- Discipline: Mountain bike racing
- Role: Rider
- Rider type: Cross-country

Major wins
- Cyclo-cross National Championships (2005) Mountain bike European XC Championships (2008, 2017) National XC Championships (2005) XC World Cup 2 individual wins (2008, 2010)
Medal record
Men's mountain bike racing
Representing Switzerland
World Championships
Gold medal – first place	2006 Rotorua	Team cross-country
Gold medal – first place	2007 Fort William	Team cross-country
Silver medal – second place	2000 Sierra Nevada	Team cross-country
Silver medal – second place	2004 Les Gets	Team cross-country
Silver medal – second place	2008 Val di Sole	Cross-country
Silver medal – second place	2008 Val di Sole	Team cross-country
Bronze medal – third place	1999 Åre	Junior cross-country
Bronze medal – third place	2000 Sierra Nevada	Junior cross-country
Bronze medal – third place	2002 Kaprun	Team cross-country
Bronze medal – third place	2004 Les Gets	Under-23 cross-country
Bronze medal – third place	2007 Fort William	Cross-country
Bronze medal – third place	2009 Canberra	Cross-country

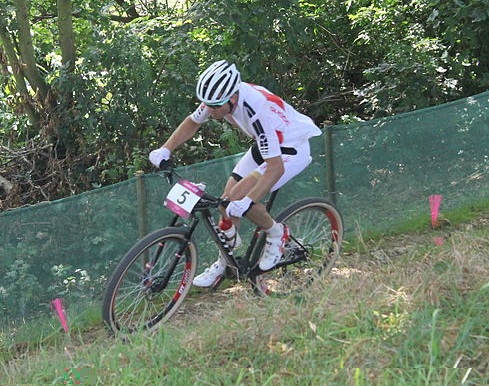
Florian Vogel at the 2012 Summer Olympics

Florian Vogel (born 18 February 1982) is a Swiss professional racing cyclist. He competed at the 2008 Summer Olympics and the 2012 Summer Olympics.

== Major results ==
=== Cyclo-cross ===
2004–2005
1st National Championships
2005–2006
2nd Frenkendorf
2006–2007
3rd National Championships
3rd Fehraltorf
2007–2008
2nd Uster
2nd Schmerikon
3rd Dübendorf
3rd Meilen
2008–2009
1st Beromünster
2nd Dagmersellen
3rd Dübendorf
3rd Schmerikon
2009–2010
2nd National Championships
2015–2016
1st Pfaffnau

=== Mountain bike ===
2000
2nd Cross-country, UEC European Junior Championships
2005
1st Cross-country, National Championships
2006
UCI Cross-country World Cup

2nd Schladming
3rd Fort William

2007
3rd Cross-country, UCI World Championships
3rd Cross-country, National Championships
2008
1st Cross-country, UEC European Championships
UCI Cross-country World Cup

1st Fort William
3rd Offenburg

2009
3rd Cross-country, UCI World Championships
2010
UCI Cross-country World Cup

1st Champéry
3rd Val di Sole
3rd Windham

2011
3rd Cross-country, UEC European Championships
UCI Cross-country World Cup

3rd Val di Sole

2015
UCI Cross-country World Cup

3rd Mont-Sainte-Anne

2017
1st Cross-country, European Championships
2019
2nd Cross-country, UEC European Championships
