= Hubert Pallhuber =

Italian cyclist

Personal information
- Born: 17 September 1965 (age 61) Brunico, Italy

Cycling career
- Sport: Cycling
- Current team: Retired
- Discipline: Mountain bike
- Role: Rider
- Rider type: Cross-country
Medal record
Representing Italy
Mountain bike racing
World Championships
Gold medal – first place	1997 Château-d'Œx	Cross-country

Hubert Pallhuber (born 17 September 1965) is an Italian former professional mountain biker.

At the 1997 UCI Mountain Bike World Championships Pallhuber won the world championship in the men's cross-country event. He is the brother of Wilfried Pallhuber.

Pallhuber also represented Italy at the Olympic Games.

His brother Wilfried competed as a professional biathlete.
