= Rune Høydahl =

Norwegian cyclist

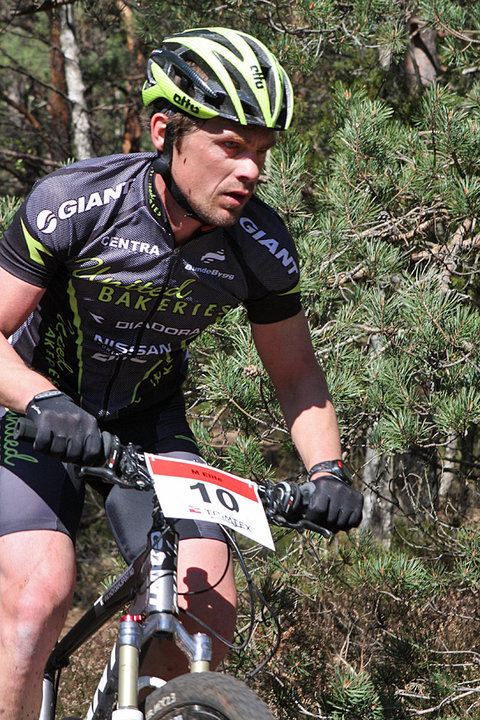
- Høydahl in 2011

Personal information
- Born: 10 December 1969 (age 56) Drammen, Norway

Cycling career
- Sport: Cycling
- Current team: Retired
- Disciplines: Mountain bike Cyclo-cross
- Role: Rider

Professional teams
- 1995–2002: Giant Bicycles
- 2006–2009: Team Etto/Høydahl
- 2010: Giant–United Bakeries
Medal record
Representing Norway
Mountain bike racing
World Championships
Silver medal – second place	1996 Cairns	Cross-country

Rune Høydahl (born 10 December 1969) is a Norwegian former mountain biker. He won 11 UCI World Cup races, and three times came second overall. Besides John Tomac, Hoydahl is the only mountain biker with World Cup victories in both downhill and cross country.

In 1995 Høydahl won five World Cup races in a row. He represented Norway at the 1996 Summer Olympics in Atlanta, Georgia and the 2000 Summer Olympics in Sydney. In addition, he won the Norseman triathlon in 2004 after having retired. He was also the captain of his own professional mountain bike team - Team Etto/Høydahl. He lives in Sande, 20 km south of Drammen.
