= Anna Szafraniec =

Polish cyclist

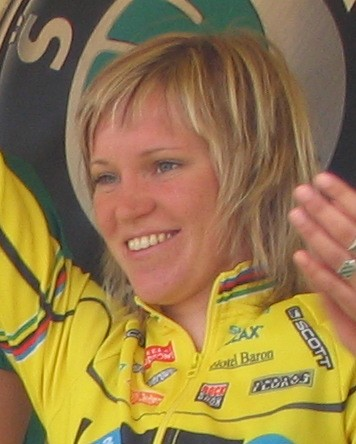

Personal information
- Nationality: Polish
- Born: 16 February 1981 (age 45) Myślenice, Poland

Sport
- Country: Poland
- Sport: Mountain biking
Medal record
Women's mountain biking
Representing Poland
World Championships
Gold medal – first place	2003 Lugano	Cross-country Team

Anna Szafraniec (born 16 February 1981) is a Polish mountain biker.

She was born in Myślenice. She competed at the 2004 Summer Olympics, in women's cross-country cycling.
