= Métabief =

- Commune
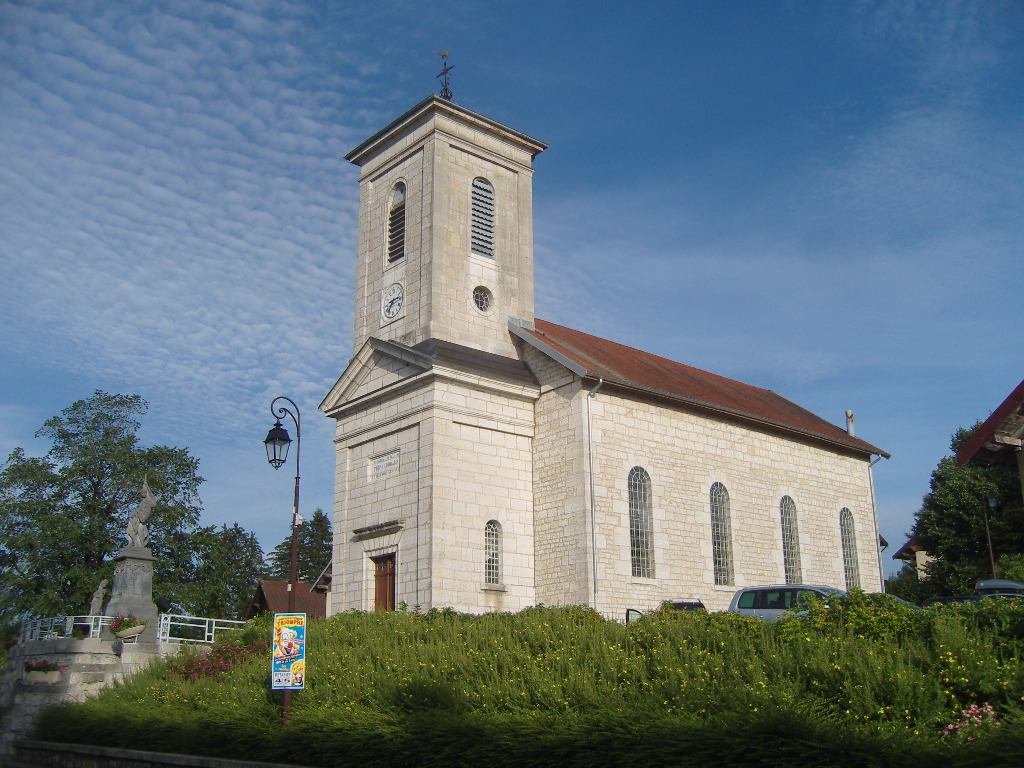
- The church in Métabief
- Location of Métabief
- Location within France Location within Bourgogne-Franche-Comté
- Coordinates: 46°46′27″N 6°21′09″E
- Country: France
- Region: Bourgogne-Franche-Comté
- Department: Doubs
- Arrondissement: Pontarlier
- Canton: Frasne

Government
  - Mayor (2021–2026): Gérard Déque
- Area^{1}: 5.76 km^{2} (2.22 sq mi)
- Highest elevation: 1,419 m (4,656 ft)
- Lowest elevation: 923 m (3,028 ft)
- Population (2023): 1,375
  - Density: 239/km^{2} (618/sq mi)
- Time zone: UTC+01:00 (CET)
  - Summer (DST): UTC+02:00 (CEST)
- INSEE/Postal code: 25380 /25370
- ^{1} French Land Register data, which excludes lakes, ponds, glaciers > 1 km^{2} (0.386 sq mi or 247 acres) and river estuaries.

Métabief (French pronunciation: [metabje]) is a commune in the Doubs department in the Bourgogne-Franche-Comté region in eastern France.

== Geography ==
The commune lies 14 km (8.7 mi) northeast of Mouthe close to the Swiss border near Jougne.

== hi ==
Historical population
Year	Pop.	±% p.a.
1968	165	—
1975	197	+2.56%
1982	250	+3.46%
1990	504	+9.16%
1999	691	+3.57%
2007	888	+3.19%
2012	1,089	+4.17%
2017	1,196	+1.89%
2023	1,375	+2.35%
Source: INSEE

== Tourism ==
Métabief is known for its winter sports, but it is also a center for tourism in the summer with hiking, mountain biking, hang gliding, mountain climbing, and spelunking. It is one of the six communes that operate the Métabief-Mont-d'Or ski resort.

== Gallery ==
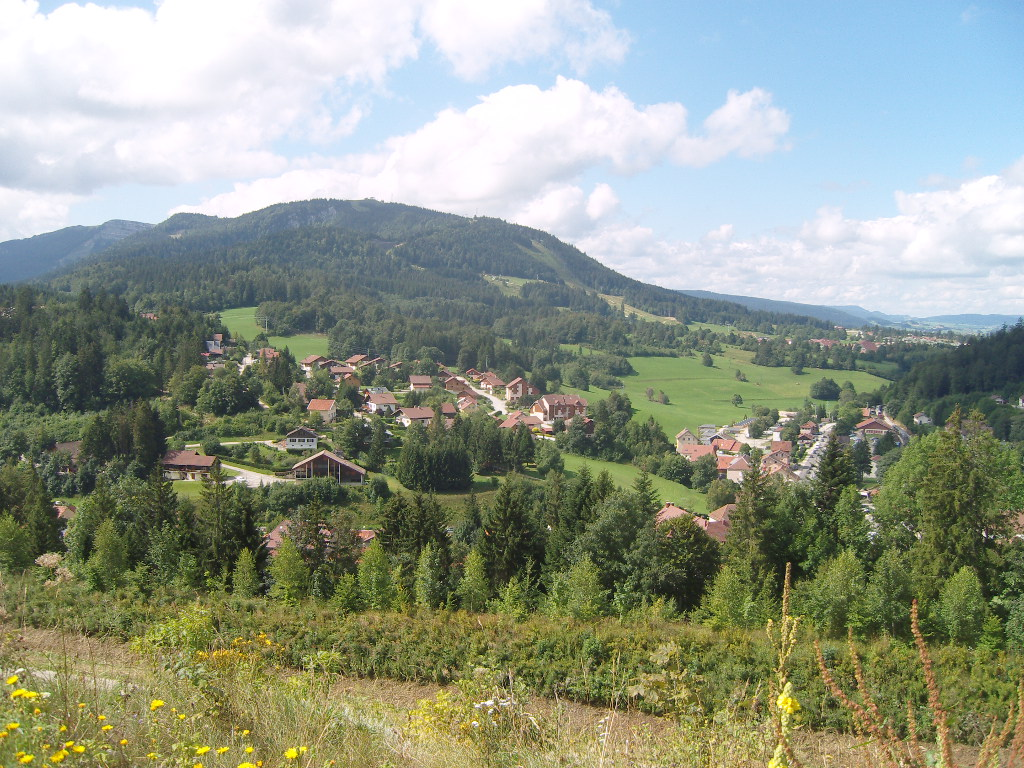
The Morond, seen from Les Hôpitaux-Neufs

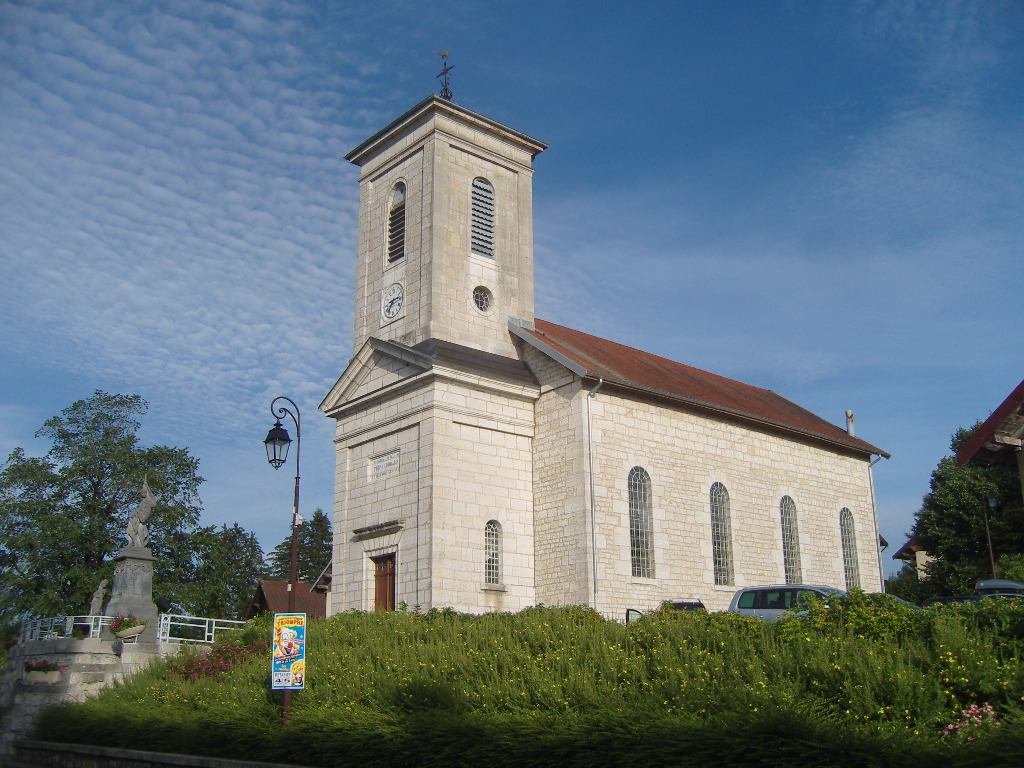
The church

== See also ==
- Communes of the Doubs department
