= Canadian peers and baronets =

Canadian nobility

Flag of New France from 1663 to 1763

Flag of Canada from 1868 to 1921

Canadian peers and baronets (French: pairs et baronnets canadiens) exist in both the peerage of France recognized by the Monarch of Canada (the same as the Monarch of the United Kingdom) and the peerage of the United Kingdom.

In 1627, French Cardinal Richelieu introduced the seigneurial system of New France. Almost all of the early French Canadians who came as officers in the military or filled important official positions within the colony in New France came from the ranks of the French nobility. Under the Ancien Régime, several of these men were promoted to more senior ranks within the peerage of France. From the early 1700s, it became customary for the governors of New France to be given the title marquis. Except for the Marquis de Vaudreuil and the Marquis de Beauharnois, most were in Canada only for a few years before returning to France and are therefore not counted as Canadians.

The Baronetage of Nova Scotia (a British hereditary title, but not a peerage) had been devised by King James VI and I in 1624 as a means of settling Nova Scotia. Except for Sir Thomas Temple, almost none of them came to Nova Scotia, therefore they are counted as British, not Canadian.

Following the British Conquest of New France in 1763, the likes of The 1st Baron Amherst and The 1st Baron Dorchester were raised to the Peerage of Great Britain for their part in the taking of Canada and as Governors General of Canada, but they were not Canadians. As the colony grew under British rule both in terms of geography and economy, baronetcies began to be conferred upon various Canadian politicians, military commanders and businessmen.

In 1891, Lord Mount Stephen became the first Canadian to be elevated to the peerage of the United Kingdom. The significant losses of the First World War included many direct heirs to titles and some replacements were found in Canada, resulting in the acquisition of titles by Canadians.

After the controversial elevation of Lords Atholstan and Beaverbrook to the Peerage of the United Kingdom, the Nickle Resolution was presented to the House of Commons of Canada in 1917 requesting the Sovereign not to grant knighthoods, baronetcies or peerages to Canadians. This triggered the Canadian titles debate and led to a separate system of orders, decorations, and medals for Canada. Canadians who were granted peerages after that date had to hold or acquire British citizenship, such as The 1st Baron Thomson of Fleet. However, the 1946 Canadian Citizenship Act provided that Canadians who acquired another citizenship by any means other than marriage had renounced their Canadian citizenship. The 1977 Citizenship Act undid this provision.

== Canadian nobility in the French aristocracy ==
=== Extant ===
Arms of the Barons de Longueuil, holders of the only current French colonial title recognized by King Charles III

- Baron de Longueuil. Created in 1700 by King Louis XIV for Charles le Moyne de Longueuil, the Canadian born Governor of Trois-Rivières and afterwards Montreal. It is currently the only extant French colonial title as recognised by King Charles III. The 3rd Baron's only daughter became the 4th Baroness de Longueuil and married the nephew (Captain David Alexander Grant) of her step-father, William Grant, of Quebec. The 10th Baron's wife, Ernestine Bowes-Lyon, was a first cousin of Queen Elizabeth The Queen Mother. The present holder is Michael Grant, 12th Baron de Longueuil.

=== Unknown ===
- Baron de Poboncoup. Created in 1651 or 1653 for Philippe Mius d'Entremont, the first of the d'Entremonts of Nova Scotia. The barony of Pobomcoup remained in the family until the expulsion of the Acadians that began in 1755 by the British.
- Comte de Saint-Laurent. Created in 1676, for Michel-François Berthelot, King's Secretary in Paris and Commissary General of the French Artillery. In 1702, he sold the Île d'Orléans to Charlotte-Françoise Juchereau de Saint-Denys (1660–1732), sister of Louis Juchereau de Saint-Denys. Another of their brothers was the grandfather of Louis Barbe Juchereau de Saint-Denys (1740–1833), created the Marquis de Saint-Denys in 1774; a first cousin of The Hon. Antoine Juchereau Duchesnay who was also a first cousin of the Marquis de Lotbinière mentioned below. From 1702, Charlotte-Françoise took the title Comtesse de Saint-Laurent and arranged for her eldest son to also bear the title, but she was unable to meet her obligations to Berthelot. A lengthy court case ensued between Quebec and Paris, and in 1713 the King ruled in Berthelot's favour. The title was however no longer used after 1913.
- Marquis de Vaudreuil. Created in 1703, for Philippe de Rigaud Vaudreuil, son of the Baron de Vaudreuil in the Languedoc. Formerly a colonel in the Musketeers of the Guard, in 1687 he came to New France in command of the Troupes de la Marine, rising to become Governor of Montreal in 1702 and the Governor General of New France the following year, serving until his death at Quebec City in 1725. His sons were: (1) Louis-Philippe de Rigaud, Comte de Vaudreuil, father of Louis-Philippe, Marquis de Vaudreuil (2) Jean-Louis de Rigaud de Vaudreuil, Vicomte de Vaudreuil (3) Pierre de Rigaud, Marquis de Vaudreuil-Cavagnal, the first native Canadian (and last) Governor General of New France (4) François-Pierre de Rigaud Vaudreuil, the last French Governor of Trois-Rivières; (5) Joseph-Hyacinthe de Rigaud, 3rd Marquis de Vaudreuil, father of Joseph Hyacinthe François de Paule de Rigaud, Comte de Vaudreuil. The title was however no longer used.

=== Extinct ===
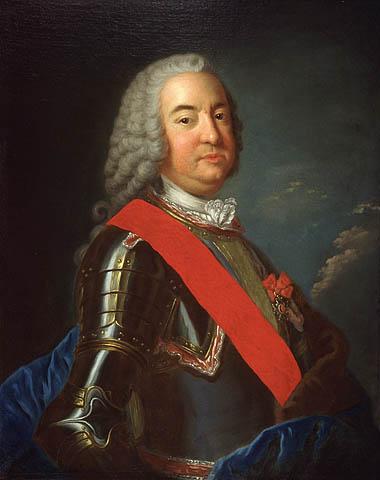
The Marquis de Vaudreuil-Cavagnal was the first Canadian-born Governor General of New France. He was a first cousin of the father of the Marquis de Lotbinière

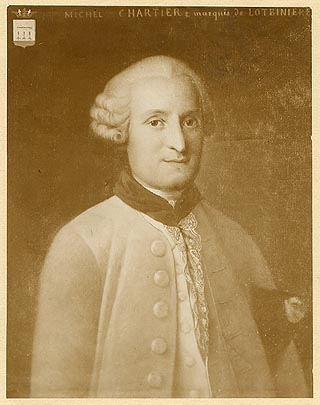
The Marquis de Lotbinière was the first native Canadian to be elevated to a Marquisate in the Peerage of France. He was the uncle of the Vicomte de Léry; a first cousin of the Marquis de Fresnoy; and his father was a first cousin of the Marquis de Vaudreuil-Cavagnal

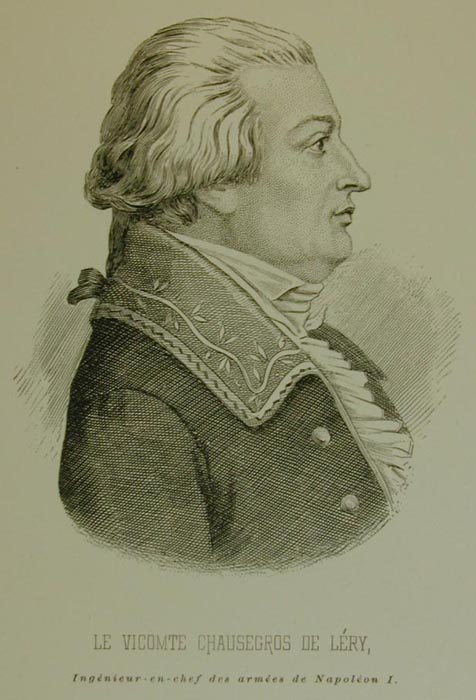
The Vicomte de Léry was the Canadian Engineer-in-Chief of Napoleon's Armies. He married a daughter of the Duc de Valmy and was a nephew of the Marquis de Lotbinière

- Baron de Portneuf. Created in 1681, for René Robineau de Bécancourt. His son, Pierre Robineau de Portneuf, sold the land to his brother but retained the title. The brother died in 1715 and the barony passed back to Pierre's daughters. The title became extinct in 1729 after the death of the 2nd Baron de Portneuf, due to a lack of male heirs.
- Comte d'Orsainville. Created in 1685, for Jean Talon, the first Intendant of New France. He died unmarried in 1694, and the title passed to his nephew, Jean-François, son of his brother, Robert (aka François), and Anne Dubois, daughter of Antoine DuBois and Louise d'Eu, who was wed to Renée Turin, widow of a Michel Séguin, and who sold the land in 1696 to the bishop of Quebec, Jean-Baptiste de La Croix de Chevrières de Saint-Vallier.
- Baron de Beauville, Acadia. Created in 1707, for François de Beauharnois de la Chaussaye, a member of the House of Beauharnais who served as Intendant of New France. He was a brother of the Marquis de Beauharnois. The Baron de Beauville died without issue in 1746 and as such the title became extinct.
- Marquis de Beauharnois. Created in 1725, for Charles de Beauharnois de la Boische, Governor General of New France from 1725 to 1746. He was a brother of the previously mentioned Baron de Beauville. He died unmarried in 1749, when the title became extinct.
- Marquis de Lotbinière. Created in 1784, for Michel Chartier de Lotbinière, the only Canadian by birth to have been elevated to that rank in the Peerage of France, and the last such creation made by Louis XVI. After the British Conquest of New France in 1763, de Lotbinière had added to his existing seigneuries by purchasing Rigaud and Vaudreuil from his father's first cousin, the Marquis de Vaudreuil-Cavagnal. He was the uncle of the Vicomte de Léry. He was a first cousin of Nicolas Renaud d'Avene des Meloizes (1729–1803) who sold their grandmother's Seigneury at Neuville and moved to France, where in 1769, he married the heiress Agathe-Louise de Fresnoy, and became the Marquis de Fresnoy. Another of his first cousins, The Hon. Antoine Juchereau Duchesnay, was also a first cousin of the previously mentioned Marquis de Saint-Denys. Lotbinière's son, Michel-Eustache-Gaspard-Alain Chartier de Lotbinière, inherited but did not use the title in order to keep political favour with the British. The de jure 2nd Marquis de Lotbinière was the father of three daughters, from whom descend the de Lotbinière-Harwood and Joly de Lotbinière families. But, as he left no male heir the title became extinct on his death at Montreal in 1822.
- Vicomte de Léry. Created in 1818, for Général François-Joseph Chaussegros de Léry, grandson of Gaspard-Joseph Chaussegros de Léry, whose wife was a first cousin of the previously mentioned Marquis de Saint-Denys. He was born at Quebec City, a nephew of the Marquis de Lotbinière. He fought as a general during the Napoleonic Wars. He was Engineer-in-Chief of Napoleon's Armies and Commander-in-Chief of Napoleon's Armies in the Netherlands. On his death, his name was on the list of officers being considered to fill the position of Marshal of France. In 1811, he was created a Baron d'Empire. In 1818, on the restoration of Louis XVIII, Chaussegros de Léry was created Vicomte de Léry and given the Grand Cross of the Legion of Honour. In 1801, he married Marie Cécile, daughter of Général François Christophe de Kellermann, 1st Duc de Valmy; Marshal of France. He retired to Château d'Etry at Annet-sur-Marne and is one of the 660 personalities whose names are engraved on the Arc de Triomphe at Paris. He was succeeded by his son, Gustave Chaussegros de Léry (1802–1850), who married a daughter of the Marquis de Somery, but died without children and as such the title became extinct.

== Canadian nobility in the aristocracy of the United Kingdom ==
=== Peerages awarded before the Nickle Resolution ===
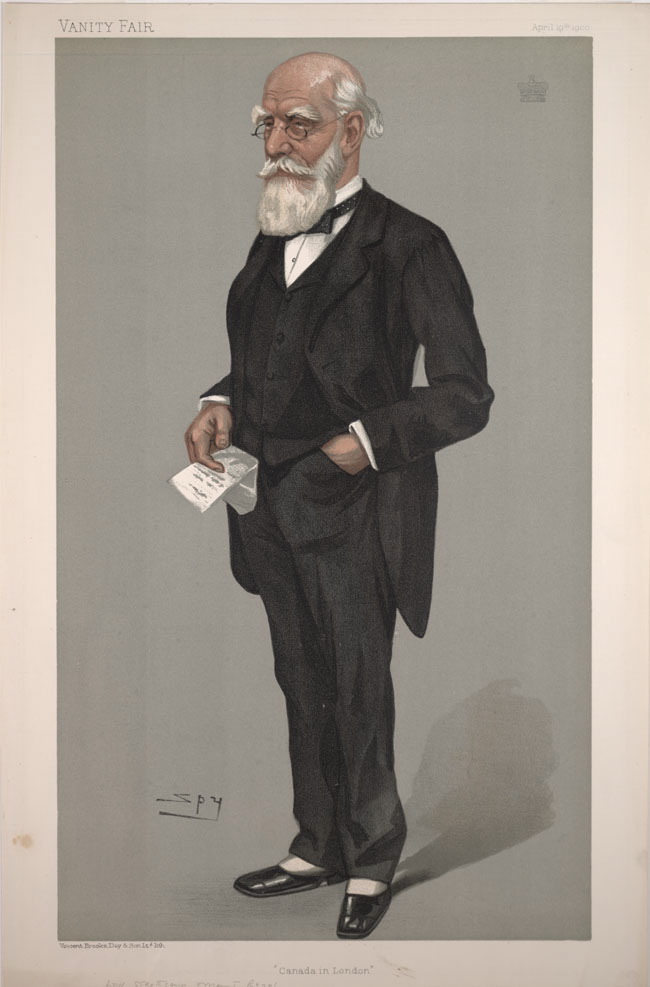
Lord Strathcona, referred to as "Uncle Donald" by King Edward VII in reference to his philanthropy. He was a first cousin of Lord Mount Stephen.

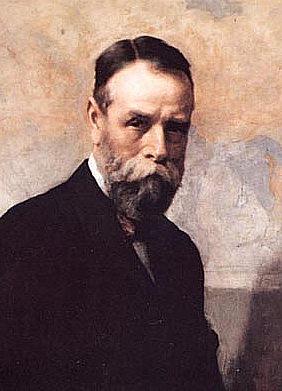
Lord Mount Stephen, the capitalist behind the creation of the Canadian Pacific Railway and a first cousin of Lord Strathcona. In 1891, he became the first Canadian to be elevated to the Peerage of the United Kingdom.

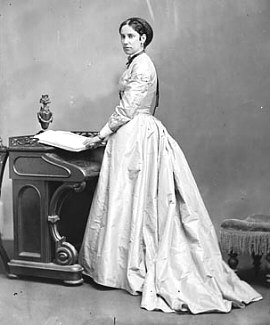
Agnes Macdonald, 1st Baroness Macdonald of Earnscliffe, was the only Canadian lady to be granted a peerage, in lieu of her deceased husband, Sir John A. Macdonald, the 1st Prime Minister of Canada after Confederation in 1867.

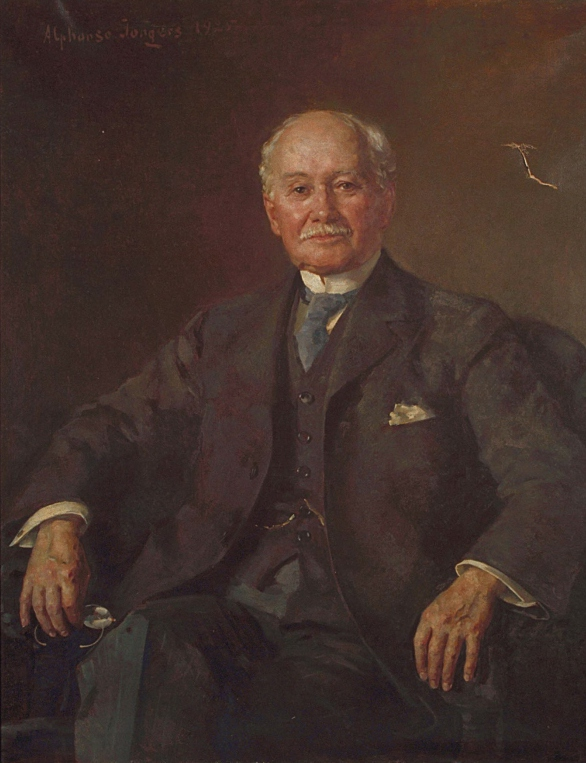
Lord Atholstan was the only Canadian in the Peerage of the United Kingdom to have been born and lived his whole life in Canada, but his was also the most controversial of all the Canadian Peerages.

==== Extant ====
- Baron Strathcona and Mount Royal, of Mount Royal in the Province of Quebec and Dominion of Canada and of Glencoe in the County of Argyll. Created in 1897 for Donald Smith, 1st Baron Strathcona and Mount Royal. He was one of the foremost builders and philanthropists in the British Empire. He was Governor of the Hudson's Bay Company, president of the Bank of Montreal, co-founder of the Canadian Pacific Railway with his first cousin Lord Mount Stephen, and Canadian High Commissioner to the United Kingdom. He built a home in the Golden Square Mile and Glencoe House. He leased Knebworth House and kept Colonsay House (still lived in by his descendants) as a summer home. By a new creation in 1900, his only daughter, Margaret Charlotte Smith, became the 2nd Baroness Strathcona and Mount Royal. The title is currently held by Donald Alexander Euan Howard.
- Baron Shaughnessy, of the City of Montreal in the Dominion of Canada and of Ashford in the County of Limerick. Created in 1916 for Thomas Shaughnessy, 1st Baron Shaughnessy. A native of the United States, he came to Montreal in 1882 where he became the 3rd president of the Canadian Pacific Railway from 1899 until his death in 1923. On the outbreak of World War I he threw his and the C.P.R.'s full support behind the war effort, for which he was awarded his peerage. He lived in the Golden Square Mile. The title is currently held by his great-grandson, the actor Charles George Patrick Shaughnessy, 5th Baron Shaughnessy.
- Baron Beaverbrook, of Beaverbrook in the Province of New Brunswick in the Dominion of Canada and of Cherkley in the County of Surrey. Created in 1917 for Sir Max Aitken, 1st Baronet. A native of New Brunswick and already a successful businessman, in 1910 he left Montreal for Britain where he became a press baron and Member of Parliament. George V was upset with his elevation to the peerage and it was met with scepticism in Canada, but it was nowhere near as controversial as that of his friend listed below, Lord Atholstan. During World War I, he was Minister of Information. During World War II, Lord Beaverbrook was Minister of Aircraft Production, Minister of Supply, Minister of War Production and Lord Privy Seal. The title is currently held by his grandson, Maxwell Aitken, 3rd Baron Beaverbrook.
- Baron Morris, of St John's in the Dominion of Newfoundland and of the City of Waterford. Created in 1918 for Edward Morris, 1st Baron Morris, Prime Minister. Though Newfoundland was then not part of Canada, he is nonetheless included. The title is currently held by his great-grandson, Thomas Anthony Salmon Morris, of London, 4th Baron Morris.

==== Extinct ====
- Baron Mount Stephen, of Mount Stephen in the Province of British Columbia and Dominion of Canada, and of Dufftown in the County of Banff. Created in 1891 for George Stephen, 1st Baron Mount Stephen. He was the president of the Bank of Montreal and the financial genius behind the creation of the Canadian Pacific Railway, once "the world's greatest transportation system". He was the first Canadian to be elevated to the Peerage of the United Kingdom and a first cousin of Lord Strathcona. Both he and his first cousin were particularly remembered for their philanthropy, between them donating many millions of dollars to charity. His home in the Golden Square Mile is today the Mount Stephen Club and from 1888 he moved permanently to England where he lived at Brocket Hall. His second wife, a niece of Lord Wolverton, was a lifelong friend and confidante of Queen Mary, whose mother she had served as a lady-in-waiting. The daughter he and his first wife adopted, Alice, married Henry Northcote, 1st Baron Northcote. Lord Mount Stephen left no male heirs and as such his title became extinct on his death at Brocket Hall in 1921.
- Baroness Macdonald of Earnscliffe, in the Province of Ontario and Dominion of Canada. Created in 1891 for Agnes Macdonald, 1st Baroness Macdonald of Earnscliffe, the widow of Sir John A. Macdonald, the 1st prime minister of Canada after Confederation in 1867. Her peerage was heritable by her heirs male, but she herself was only survived by a daughter, and so the title became extinct on her death in England in 1920. Her late husband, of whom she was the second wife, was also survived by one son from his first marriage, Sir Hugh John Macdonald, but he was not eligible to inherit the title from his stepmother.
- Baron Haliburton, of Windsor, in the Province of Nova Scotia and Dominion of Canada. Created in 1898 for Arthur Haliburton, 1st Baron Haliburton. He was born at Windsor, his family's home since 1763. After his education he went to England where he was a civil servant, rising to under-secretary of state for war and deputy lieutenant of London. He was married, but died without children and the title died with him.
- Baron Pirrie, of the City of Belfast. Created in 1906 for William Pirrie, who was raised to a viscountcy in 1921 (see below).
- Baron Atholstan, of Huntingdon in the Province of Quebec in the Dominion of Canada and of the City of Edinburgh. Created in 1917, for Hugh Graham, 1st Baron Atholstan, a staunch imperialist, one of the Conservative Party's largest fund-raisers and arguably the most powerful media executive in Canada in his capacity as owner of the Montreal Star. He was born at Huntingdon, Quebec, and after his education lived for the remainder of his life in Montreal. He was the only Canadian peer of the United Kingdom to have lived his whole life in Canada. However, his elevation to the peerage, for which he owed much to the machinations of his friends Lord Beaverbrook and Lord Northcliffe, was controversial in Canada and against the wishes of both the Governor General (the Duke of Devonshire) and Prime Minister Robert Borden. He was the father of one daughter but left no male heirs, and the title became extinct on his death at his home in the Golden Square Mile, 1938.

=== Peerages awarded after the Nickle Resolution ===
==== Extant ====
- Baron Coleraine, of Haltemprice in the East Riding of the County of York. Created in 1954 for Conservative politician Richard Law, the son of Bonar Law, a Conservative prime minister. Like Hugh Molson (see below), Richard Law was born in England to a father born in Canada.
- Baron Thomson of Fleet, of Northbridge in the City of Edinburgh. Created in 1964 for Roy Thomson, 1st Baron Thomson of Fleet, a native of Toronto who later continued his career as a newspaper owner in England. His family continue to reside in Toronto and the title is currently held by his grandson, David Thomson, 3rd Baron Thomson of Fleet.

==== Extinct ====
- Viscount Pirrie, of the City of Belfast. Created in 1921, for William Pirrie, 1st Viscount Pirrie, who was born at Quebec City to Irish parents. He returned to Ireland when he was two. He became chairman of shipbuilding firm Harland and Wolff and served as Lord Mayor of Belfast. The title became extinct on his death in 1924.
- Viscount Greenwood, of Holbourne in the County of London. Created in 1937, for Hamar Greenwood, 1st Viscount Greenwood, who was born at Whitby, Ontario to a Welsh father and a mother of United Empire Loyalist stock. He sat as a Liberal for York, Sunderland and Walthamstow East, during which time he held ministerial office in the coalition government. He had been created a baronet in 1915. The title became extinct upon the death of the third viscount in 2003.
- Viscount Bennett, of Mickleham in the County of Surrey and of Calgary and Hopewell in the Dominion of Canada. Created in 1941 for Richard Bedford Bennett, a native of New Brunswick and the 11th Prime Minister of Canada who revived the awarding of Imperial honours to Canadians during the 1930s. He afterwards retired to England and the title became extinct on his death at Mickleham, Surrey in 1947.

=== Life peerages ===
A life peerage is not an hereditary title. The title lasts as long as the recipient of the honour is alive. The recipient's children can style themselves with the prefix 'honourable' but they cannot inherit the baronial title.

==== Current ====
- Baron Black of Crossharbour, of Crossharbour in the London Borough of Tower Hamlets. In 2001, Tony Blair advised Queen Elizabeth II to confer on Conrad Black the dignity of a life peerage with the title of Baron Black. Canadian Prime Minister Jean Chrétien gave the opinion to his government's nationality department that a Canadian citizen should not receive a British titular honour, citing the 1919 Nickle Resolution. Black at the time held both Canadian and British citizenship. After the Federal Court of Canada ruled against Black in his suit against Chrétien, Black renounced his Canadian citizenship in 2001, remaining a citizen of the UK. In 2007, in Chicago, Conrad Black was sent to jail for six years after being convicted of defrauding investors. He was released in May 2012 following an appeal, after spending three years in a prison in Florida. He has since been expelled from the Queen's Privy Council for Canada and removed from the Order of Canada. In an interview with Peter Mansbridge in May 2012, Black said he would consider applying for Canadian citizenship "within a year or two" when he hoped the matter would no longer be controversial and he could "make an application like any other person who has been a temporary resident." Black regained his Canadian citizenship in April 2023. Black ceased to be a member of the House of Lords on 9 July 2024 under the House of Lords Reform Act 2014 because of non-attendance in the preceding session of Parliament.
- Baron Wasserman, of Pimlico in the City of Westminster. Created 2011 for Gordon Wasserman, retired Assistant Under Secretary of State (i.e. two grades lower than Permanent Secretary in Civil Service) at the Home Office. Lord Wasserman sits in the House of Lords as a Conservative.

==== Former ====
- Baron Molson, of High Peak in the County of Derby. Created in 1961, for The Rt. Hon. Hugh Molson, P.C., M.P. Though born and brought up in England, he was a member of the Molson family of Montreal, where his father and elder brother were born. He was a great-grandson of Lt.-Colonel The Hon. John Molson (1787–1860), of Belmont Hall, Montreal.
- Baron Pearson, of Minnedosa in Canada and of the Royal Borough of Kensington and Chelsea. Created in 1965 under the Appellate Jurisdiction Act 1876 for Colin Pearson, who was born in Minnedosa, Manitoba and sat as a Lord of Appeal in Ordinary for nine years.
- Baron Noel-Baker, of the City of Derby. Created in 1977, for The Rt. Hon. Philip Noel-Baker, politician and Olympian. Like Lords Coleraine and Molson (see above), Noel-Baker was born in England to a Canadian-born father, Joseph Allen Baker.
- Baroness Lestor of Eccles, of Tooting Bec in the London Borough of Wandsworth. Created in 1997 for former Labour member of Parliament, Joan Lestor, Baroness Lestor, born in Vancouver to the journalist and Marxist writer, Charles Lestor. From 1966, Lestor had sat for Eton and Slough and then for Eccles, during which time she held ministerial office, before retiring at the 1997 general election.

=== Canadian baronetcies ===
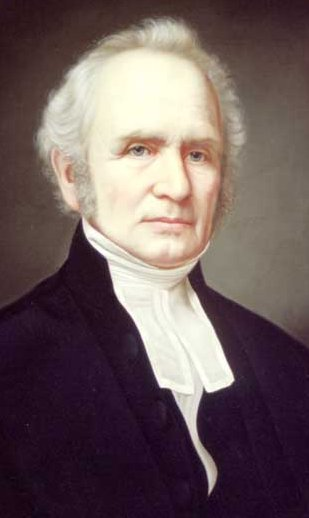
Chief Justice Sir John Beverley Robinson, a native of Quebec, dominated the politics of Upper Canada and was the undisputed leader of the Family Compact.

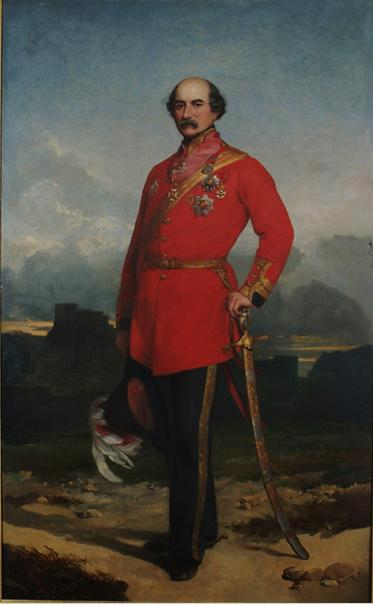
General Sir William Fenwick Williams was a native of Nova Scotia who won his fame during the Crimean War and later served as Lieutenant Governor of Nova Scotia.

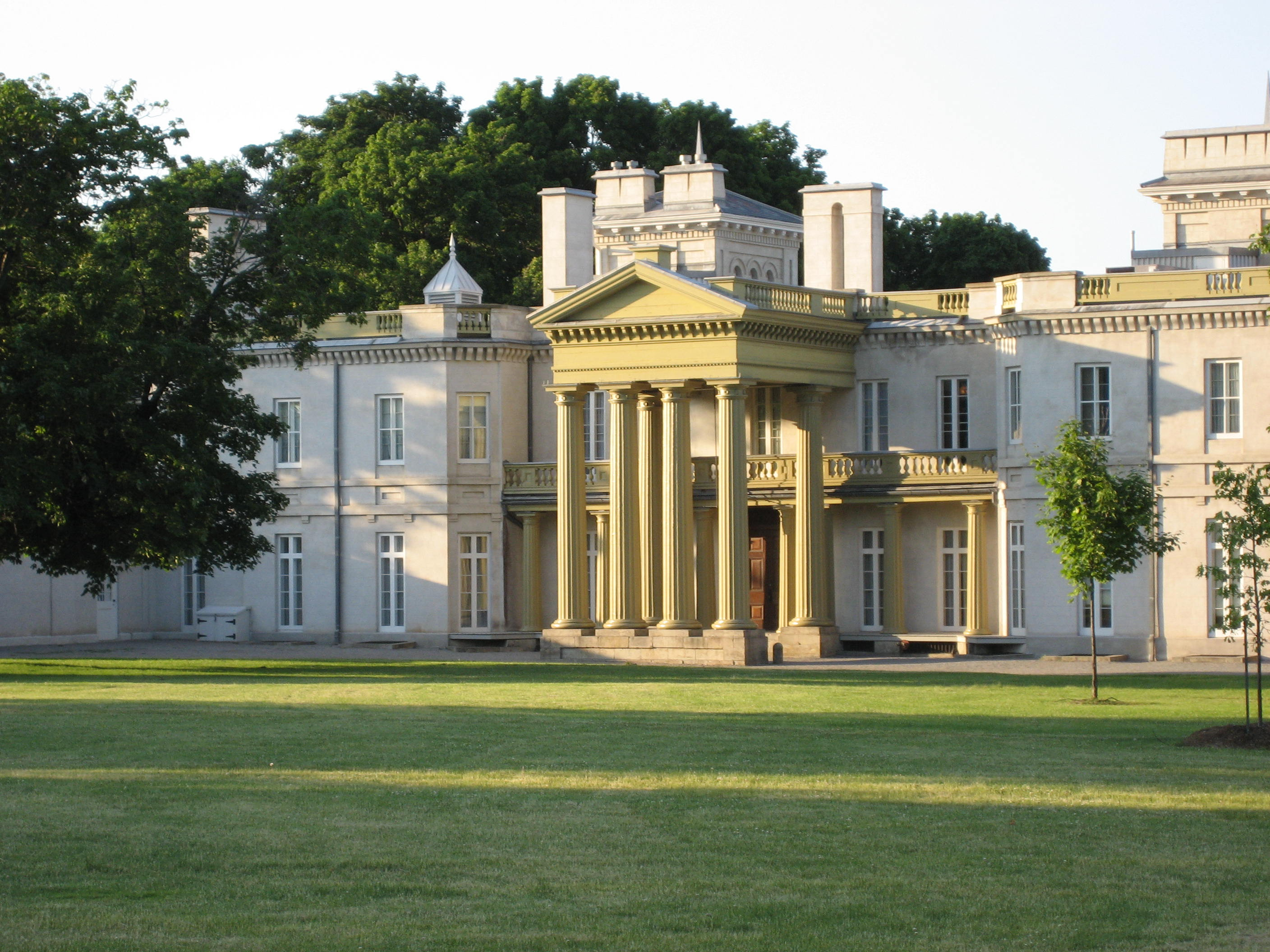
Dundurn Castle was the home built in his native Ontario by Sir Allan Napier MacNab, Premier of Canada before Confederation.

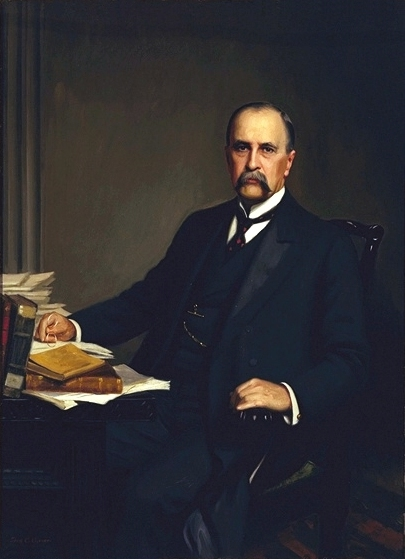
Sir William Osler was a native Canadian dubbed "the father of modern medicine". He is arguably Canada's most famous physician

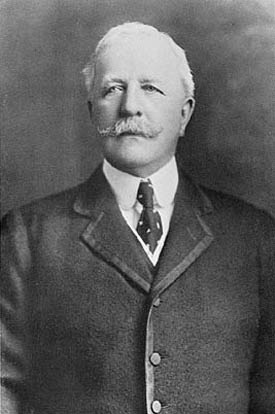
Sir Vincent Meredith, a member of a notable Canadian family, was the first Canadian-born president of the Bank of Montreal, then Canada's national bank.

Although a baronet is not a peer, it is a British hereditary title and an honour that was conferred upon several Canadians.

==== Extant ====
- Rose of Montreal. Created in 1872, for Sir John Rose, Solicitor General of Canada and the Canadian Minister of Finance. The title is currently held by Sir Julian Rose, 5th Baronet, of Hardwick House, Oxfordshire.
- Tupper of Armdale, Nova Scotia. Created in 1888, for Sir Charles Tupper, Canadian High Commissioner to the United Kingdom and Prime Minister of Canada. The title is currently held by Sir Charles Hibbert Tupper, 6th Bt., of Nanaimo on Vancouver Island.

==== Dormant ====
- Arthur of Upper Canada. Created in 1841, for Lt.-General Sir George Arthur, Lieutenant Governor of Upper Canada from 1838 to 1841. The presumed heir is Benjamin Nathan Arthur.
- Robinson of Toronto. Created in 1854, for Sir John Beverley Robinson, the son of a prominent United Empire Loyalist, he became Chief Justice of Upper Canada and dominated the politics of Upper Canada as the undisputed leader of the Family Compact. The title is currently presumed to be held by Christopher Philipse Robinson, of Toronto.

==== Extinct ====
- Temple of Nova Scotia. Created in 1662, for Sir Thomas Temple, in the Baronetage of Nova Scotia. He was Governor of Acadia, residing in Nova Scotia from 1657 to 1670 and only returning to England shortly before his death in 1674, when the title became extinct.
- Coffin of the Magdalen Islands. Created in 1804, for Loyalist Admiral Sir Isaac Coffin. His long association with his estates in Canada, with family in Quebec and his business there, meant "he had crossed the Atlantic, on service or pleasure, no less than thirty times." He left no male heirs and as such the title became extinct on his death at Cheltenham in 1839.
- Sheaffe. Created in 1813, for the Loyalist General Sir Roger Hale Sheaffe for his part in the British-Canadian victory at the Battle of Queenston Heights during the War of 1812. He was afterwards Lieutenant Governor of Upper Canada. His son and heir, Percy, predeceased him in 1834, and as such the title became extinct on his death at Edinburgh in 1851.
- Smith of Pickering. Created in 1821, for Sir David William Smith, Speaker of the Legislative Assembly of Upper Canada. His son and heir, David Smith, an officer in the Royal Navy was killed on HMS Spartan at Quiberon Bay in 1811, aged sixteen, and as such the title became extinct on his death near his native Alnwick in 1837.
- Campbell of New Brunswick. Created in 1831, for General Sir Archibald Campbell, Lieutenant Governor of New Brunswick from 1831 to 1837. He married his cousin, the sister of John MacDonald of Garth and Mrs William McGillivray, of Montreal. The title became extinct on the death of the 5th Baronet in 1949.
- Stuart of Oxford County. Created in 1841, for Sir James Stuart, the son of a prominent United Empire Loyalist, he became Chief Justice of Lower Canada. The title became extinct in 1915 on the death of Sir James Stuart, 4th Bt.
- Lafontaine of Montreal. Created in 1854 for Sir Louis-Hippolyte Lafontaine, the first native Canadian to become prime minister of the United Province of Canada and afterwards Chief Justice of Canada East. The title became extinct in 1867 after the death of his son, Sir Louis-Hippolyte La Fontaine, 2nd Bt.
- Williams of Kars. Created in 1856, for General Sir William Fenwick Williams in recognition of his gallant role in the Siege of Kars during the Crimean War. Born at Annapolis Royal, Nova Scotia, he was later appointed the 1st Lieutenant Governor of Nova Scotia and Commander-in-Chief of the Forces in Canada. He died unmarried at London in 1883, and as such the title became extinct.
- MacNab of Dundurn Castle. Created in 1858, for Sir Allan Napier MacNab, of Dundurn Castle, Hamilton, Ontario. A native of Niagara-on-the-Lake, he became Premier of the Province of Canada from 1854 to 1856. The title became extinct on his death after his son predeceased him in a shooting accident. He was the successor of the 12th Chief of Clan Macnab, but after his death the chieftainship passed to the Macnabs of Arthurstone. His second daughter, Sophia, married William Keppel, 7th Earl of Albemarle.
- Cunard of Bush Hill, Nova Scotia. Created in 1859, for Sir Samuel Cunard, the Canadian-born British shipping magnate, founder of the Cunard Line. The title became extinct in 1989 on the death of Sir Guy Cunard, 7th Bt.
- Cartier of Montreal. Created in 1868, for Sir George-Étienne Cartier, the French Canadian Premier of Canada East and one of the Fathers of Canadian Confederation. He had three daughters, but the title became extinct on his death in 1873 due to a lack of male heirs.
- Clouston of Montreal. Created in 1908, for Sir Edward Seaborne Clouston, president of the Canadian Bankers Association and general manager of the Bank of Montreal. He was survived by one daughter, Mrs Marjorie Meredith Todd, but the title became extinct after his death in 1912 due to a lack of male heirs.
- Osler of Toronto. Created in 1911 for Sir William Osler, dubbed the "Father of modern medicine". His son and heir, Lt. Edward Revere Osler of the Royal Field Artillery, was killed during the Battle of Passchendaele and as such the title became extinct in 1919.
- Parker of Carlton House Terrace. Created in 1915, for Sir Gilbert Parker, born at Camden East, Ontario. He emigrated to London in the mid-1880s where he became a Member of Parliament and an author who contributed to the validation of Québécois culture within English Canada. The title became extinct on his death in 1932.
- Meredith of Montreal. Created in 1916, for Sir Vincent Meredith, the first Canadian-born president of the Bank of Montreal. He played a leading role in successfully steering Canada's economy through World War I. He married a niece of Sir Hugh Allan of Ravenscrag, Montreal, but they left no children and the title became extinct on his death in 1929.
- Flavelle of Toronto. Created in 1917, for Sir Joseph Wesley Flavelle, president of the William Davies Company, in its time the largest pork packing company in the British Empire, and subsequently chairman of the Bank of Commerce and chairman of the Imperial Munitions Board during World War I. The title became extinct in 1985 after the death of his grandson, Sir David Ellsworth Flavelle, 3rd Bt., of Toronto.
- Orr-Lewis of Whitewebbs Park. Created in 1920, for Sir Frederick Orr-Lewis, president of Canadian Vickers during World War I. The title became extinct in 1980 on the death of his son, Sir Duncan Orr-Lewis, 2nd Bt.
- Edgar of Chalfont Park. Created in 1920, for Sir Edward Mackay Edgar, a native of Montreal who settled in England and became chairman of British Controlled Oilfields. His only son and heir was killed in a car accident in 1925, and as such the title became extinct on his death in 1934.
- Dunn of Bathurst, New Brunswick. Created in 1921, for Sir James Hamet Dunn, Canadian financier and steel magnate. The title became extinct in 1976 on the death of his only son, Sir Philip Gordon Dunn 2nd Bt., father of Lady Serena Dunn Rothschild and Nell Dunn.
- MacMaster of Glengarry County, Ontario, and Montreal. Created in 1921, for Sir Donald MacMaster, a Canadian lawyer and politician who sat both in the House of Commons of Canada and the British House of Commons. His only son and heir, Donald, had been killed in action at the Battle of Loos commanding a company of the Queen's Own Cameron Highlanders, as such the title became extinct on his death in 1922.

== Canadians with hereditary titles ==
- Sir James Lauder Brunton 4th Bt., of Stratford Place was born at Montreal and educated at Bishop's College School, Lennoxville, Quebec, and McGill University, Montreal. He is Professor of Medicine at the University of Toronto. His father and grandfather were also both educated at McGill. His grandfather (the 2nd Baronet) settled the family in Canada from 1912.
- Sir James Grant-Suttie 9th Bt., of Balgone, County Haddington was born at Sussex, New Brunswick, as was his father, the 8th Baronet, a graduate of McGill University and "always a proud Canadian". His grandfather emigrated to Canada after World War II where he married a woman from Newfoundland.
- Sir Wayne Alexander King 8th Bt., of Charlestown, Roscommon, Ireland. Emigrated from the United Kingdom in 1981 and currently resides in Morrisburg, Ontario with his wife Deborah (MacDougall)
- Fergus Day Hort Macdowall, 27th of Garthland. Although neither a peer nor a baronet, his title is Chief of Clan Macdowall. He was born in British Columbia where his grandfather, Day Hort MacDowall, 25th of Garthland, had emigrated in 1879. He was educated at Brentwood College School, British Columbia; Stowe School, Buckinghamshire, and McGill University, Montreal. He currently resides in North Saanich, British Columbia.
- Rolfe William Swinton, 36th of that Ilk. Although neither a peer nor a baronet, his title is Chief of Clan Swinton. His great-grandfather emigrated to Edmonton, Alberta, and he lives in Calgary, Alberta. His father died on 19 August 2007 in Calgary, at which point he succeeded as 36th Swinton of that Ilk.
- Sir Michael Philip Stonhouse 15th Bt., of Radley lives at Lloydminster, Saskatchewan. His grandfather emigrated to Alberta.
- Sir Christopher Hilaro Barlow, 7th Bt., of Fort William was educated at Eton College and McGill University, Montreal. He currently lives in Hamilton, Ontario.
- Sir David William Hart Dyke, 10th Bt., who in 2008 stood in the 40th Canadian General Election as the Green Party candidate for Hamilton East—Stoney Creek, Ontario.
- Oliver Peter St John, 9th Earl of Orkney and his son Oliver St John, Viscount Kirkwall live in Manitoba.
- Konstantin Karl Ludwig Willibald Georg, Graf von Waldburg zu Zeil und Trauchburg resides at Sutton, Quebec. His title is of a German house that had until 1806 been imperial counts (reichsgrafen) in the Holy Roman Empire, and whose territory was in that year mediatized to Württemberg.
- Prince Hermann Friedrich of Leiningen – 173rd in line to the throne, his great-great-great-grandfather, Prince Alfred of the United Kingdom, Duke of Saxe-Coburg and Gotha, being Queen Victoria’s second born son.
- Sir Phillip Luttrell Stuart 9th Bt., of Hartley Mauduit lives at Ladysmith, British Columbia.
- Count Franz Antal Zichy lives in Toronto and parents lived in Calgary. His title, inherited from his father, is from the Hungarian nobility, where he was born.
- Sir Roderick McQuhae Mackenzie, 12th Bt., of Scatwell lives at Calgary, Alberta.
- Sir Benjamin Barrington 8th Bt., of Limerick lives at Calgary, Alberta.
- John Tottenham, 9th Marquess of Ely lives at Calgary, Alberta.
- Michael Chou-Leng Looi Lyons, Baron of Winchburgh lives at Mississauga, Ontario.
- Sir Cecil Edward Denny, 6th Bt., of Castle Moyle Major Cecil Denny came west as a member of the North-West Mounted Police in 1874 and later became an Indian agent and author. He succeeded to the title in 1921, and died in Calgary, unmarried in 1928.
- 10th, 11th and 12th Earls of Egmont. Created in 1733 for John Perceval, 1st Viscount Perceval. The first earl descended from John Perceval, who on 9 September 1661, was created a Baronet, of Kanturk in the County of Cork, in the Baronetage of Ireland. Frederick Joseph Trevelyan Perceval, de jure 10th Earl of Egmont (1873–1932), rancher at Priddis, Alberta, was found to be the senior remaining descendant of the second earl's (1711–1770) seventh son and inherited the estate in 1929. Thomas Frederick Gerald Perceval, 12th Earl of Egmont, (1934–2011), rancher, of High River died on 6 November 2011 and the earldom, and all of its subsidiary titles (Baron Arden, Baron Perceval, Viscount Perceval, Baron Lovel and Holland) became extinct. The title was perpetuated in the provincial urban constituency of Calgary-Egmont which encompassed the 11th Earl's former ranch just north of Fish Creek from 1971 to 2012.
- John Philip Monckton-Arundell, 13th Viscount Galway, Baron Killard. Created June 24, 1727. The current Viscount Galway resides in Toronto, Ontario.

== Canadian peers by marriage ==
- Zoe Ann Molson, daughter of Senator Hartland de Montarville Molson, became Viscountess Hardinge upon her marriage in 1955 to Henry Nicholas Paul Hardinge, 5th Viscount Hardinge, himself the son of Margaret Fleming, granddaughter of Sandford Fleming. They divorced in 1982. Their son, the late 6th Viscount Hardinge, was born at Montreal and educated at Upper Canada College in Toronto, Trinity College School in Port Hope, Ontario, and McGill University.
- Sylvana Tomaselli became Countess of St Andrews upon her marriage in 1988 to George Windsor, Earl of St Andrews. Her husband uses the courtesy title Earl of St Andrews, a subsidiary title of his father, Prince Edward, Duke of Kent, a grandson of George V. Upon the death of the Duke of Kent, it is expected that George will succeed to the title and Sylvana will become Duchess of Kent, Countess of St Andrews, and Baroness Downpatrick. At that time, her son, Edward, also a citizen of Canada and presently styled as Lord Downpatrick, and his wife, if any, will then use the titles Earl and Countess of St Andrews as courtesy titles; their eldest son, if any, would be known as Lord Downpatrick.
- Karen Gordon became Countess Spencer upon her marriage in 2011 to Charles Spencer, 9th Earl Spencer, brother of Diana, Princess of Wales.

== Canadians married to royalty in the line of succession ==
- Autumn Kelly was married to Peter Phillips, the oldest grandchild of Queen Elizabeth II, and elder child of Princess Anne from 2008 until their divorce was finalized in June 2021. Her ex-husband and their children are in the line of succession to the Monarch of Canada, under Elizabeth II's line of succession.

== Russian nobility and royalty ==
- Michael Ignatieff – Ignatieff's paternal grandfather was Count Pavel Ignatieff.
- Grand Duchess Olga Alexandrovna of Russia arrived in Canada in May 1948 and bought a 200-acre (81 ha) farm in Halton, Ontario

== See also ==
- Monarchy of Canada
- Australian peers and baronets
