= 2021 UCI Mountain Bike World Cup =

Series of races for all-terrain bicyclists

- Thirty-second edition of the UCI Mountain Bike World Cup

Details
- Dates: May–September 2021
- Races: 6 (XCO); 6 (DHI)

Champions
- Male individual champion: (Switzerland) Mathias Flückiger (XCO) (France) Loïc Bruni (DH)
- Female individual champion: (France) Loana Lecomte (XCO) (Austria) Valentina Höll (DH)

The 2021 Mercedes-Benz UCI Mountain Bike World Cup was a series of races in Olympic Cross-Country (XCO), Cross-Country Eliminator (XCE), and Downhill (DHI). Each discipline had an Elite Men and an Elite Women category. There were also under-23 categories in the XCO and junior categories in the DHI.

== Cross-country ==
=== Elite ===
Date	Venue	Podium (Men)	Podium (Women)
9 May	(Germany) Albstadt	Victor Koretzky (FRA)	Loana Lecomte (FRA)
9 May	(Germany) Albstadt	Nino Schurter (SUI)	Pauline Ferrand-Prévot (FRA)
9 May	(Germany) Albstadt	Mathias Flückiger (SUI)	Haley Batten (USA)
16 May	(Czech Republic) Nové Město	Tom Pidcock (GBR)	Loana Lecomte (FRA)
16 May	(Czech Republic) Nové Město	Mathieu van der Poel (NED)	Haley Batten (USA)
16 May	(Czech Republic) Nové Město	Mathias Flückiger (SUI)	Rebecca McConnell (AUS)
13 June	(Austria) Leogang	Mathias Flückiger (SUI)	Loana Lecomte (FRA)
13 June	(Austria) Leogang	Ondřej Cink (CZE)	Jenny Rissveds (SWE)
13 June	(Austria) Leogang	Anton Cooper (NZL)	Laura Stigger (AUT)
4 July	(France) Les Gets	Mathias Flückiger (SUI)	Loana Lecomte (FRA)
4 July	(France) Les Gets	Ondřej Cink (CZE)	Jenny Rissveds (SWE)
4 July	(France) Les Gets	Jordan Sarrou (FRA)	Evie Richards (GBR)
5 September	(Switzerland) Lenzerheide	Victor Koretzky (FRA)	Evie Richards (GBR)
5 September	(Switzerland) Lenzerheide	Nino Schurter (SUI)	Rebecca McConnell (AUS)
5 September	(Switzerland) Lenzerheide	Mathias Flückiger (SUI)	Jenny Rissveds (SWE)
19 September	(United States) Snowshoe	Christopher Blevins (USA)	Evie Richards (GBR)
19 September	(United States) Snowshoe	Vlad Dascălu (ROM)	Rebecca McConnell (AUS)
19 September	(United States) Snowshoe	Ondřej Cink (CZE)	Anne Tauber (NED)

=== Under 23 ===
Date	Venue	Podium (Men)	Podium (Women)
8 May	(Germany) Albstadt	Carter Woods (CAN)	Mona Mitterwallner (AUT)
8 May	(Germany) Albstadt	David List (GER)	Caroline Bohé (DEN)
8 May	(Germany) Albstadt	Simone Avondetto (ITA)	Kata Blanka Vas (HUN)
15 May	(Czech Republic) Nové Město	Carter Woods (CAN)	Mona Mitterwallner (AUT)
15 May	(Czech Republic) Nové Město	Riley Amos (USA)	Caroline Bohé (DEN)
15 May	(Czech Republic) Nové Město	Alexandre Balmer (SUI)	Kata Blanka Vas (HUN)
13 June	(Austria) Leogang	Riley Amos (USA)	Mona Mitterwallner (AUT)
13 June	(Austria) Leogang	Martín Vidaurre (CHL)	Kata Blanka Vas (HUN)
13 June	(Austria) Leogang	Joel Roth (SUI)	Caroline Bohé (DEN)
4 July	(France) Les Gets	Simone Avondetto (ITA)	Mona Mitterwallner (AUT)
4 July	(France) Les Gets	Martín Vidaurre (CHL)	Caroline Bohé (DEN)
4 July	(France) Les Gets	Juri Zanotti (ITA)	Leonie Daubermann (GER)
5 September	(Switzerland) Lenzerheide	Martín Vidaurre (CHL)	Mona Mitterwallner (AUT)
5 September	(Switzerland) Lenzerheide	Juri Zanotti (ITA)	Caroline Bohé (DEN)
5 September	(Switzerland) Lenzerheide	Joel Roth (SUI)	Savilia Blunk (USA)
19 September	(United States) Snowshoe	Martín Vidaurre (CHI)	Mona Mitterwallner (AUT)
19 September	(United States) Snowshoe	Simone Avondetto (ITA)	Caroline Bohé (DEN)
19 September	(United States) Snowshoe	Joel Roth (SUI)	Savilia Blunk (USA)

== Downhill ==
=== Elite ===
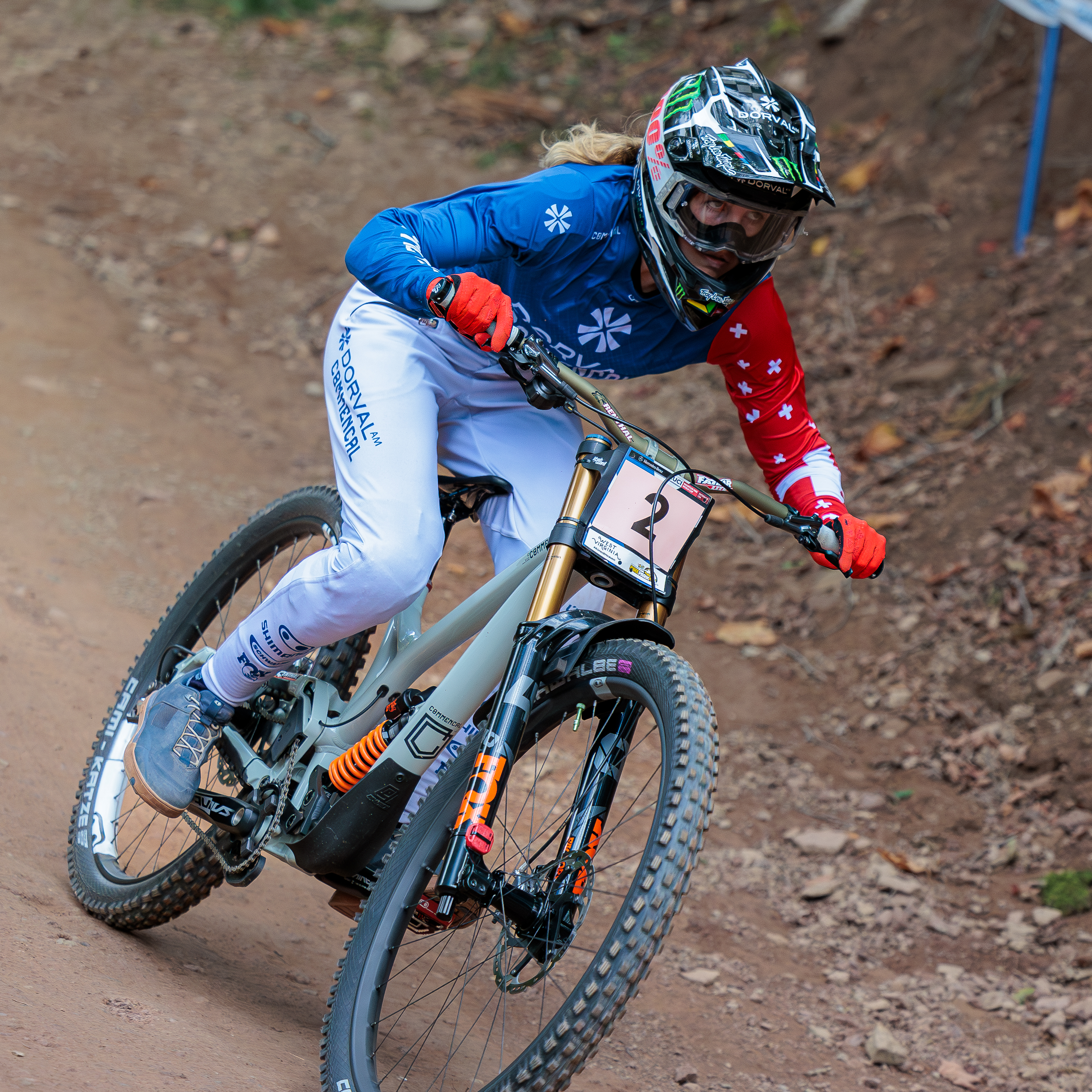
Balanche in Snowshoe, West Virginia

Date	Venue	Podium (Men)	Podium (Women)
12 June	(Austria) Leogang	Troy Brosnan (AUS)	Camille Balanche (SUI)
12 June	(Austria) Leogang	Thibaut Dapréla (FRA)	Valentina Höll (AUT)
12 June	(Austria) Leogang	Amaury Pierron (FRA)	Monika Hrastnik (SLO)
3 July	(France) Les Gets	Thibaut Dapréla (FRA)	Tahnée Seagrave (GBR)
3 July	(France) Les Gets	Max Hartenstern (GER)	Myriam Nicole (FRA)
3 July	(France) Les Gets	Baptiste Pierron (FRA)	Camille Balanche (SUI)
15 August	(Slovenia) Maribor	Loris Vergier (FRA)	Myriam Nicole (FRA)
15 August	(Slovenia) Maribor	Thibaut Dapréla (FRA)	Eleonora Farina (ITA)
15 August	(Slovenia) Maribor	Laurie Greenland (GBR)	Camille Balanche (SUI)
4 September	(Switzerland) Lenzerheide	Loris Vergier (FRA)	Myriam Nicole (FRA)
4 September	(Switzerland) Lenzerheide	Loïc Bruni (FRA)	Tahnée Seagrave (GBR)
4 September	(Switzerland) Lenzerheide	Thibaut Dapréla (FRA)	Valentina Höll (AUT)
15 September	(United States) Snowshoe	Reece Wilson (GBR)	Valentina Höll (AUT)
15 September	(United States) Snowshoe	Loïc Bruni (FRA)	Camille Balanche (SUI)
15 September	(United States) Snowshoe	Loris Vergier (FRA)	Marine Cabirou (FRA)
18 September	(United States) Snowshoe	Loïc Bruni (FRA)	Valentina Höll (AUT)
18 September	(United States) Snowshoe	Troy Brosnan (AUS)	Marine Cabirou (FRA)
18 September	(United States) Snowshoe	Ángel Suárez (ESP)	Camille Balanche (SUI)

=== Junior ===
Date	Venue	Podium (Men)	Podium (Women)
12 June	(Austria) Leogang	Pau Menoyo (ESP)	Sophie Gutöhrle (AUT)
12 June	(Austria) Leogang	Jackson Goldstone (CAN)	Léona Pierrini (FRA)
12 June	(Austria) Leogang	Dennis Luffman (GBR)	Izabela Yankova (BUL)
3 July	(France) Les Gets	Jackson Goldstone (CAN)	Phoebe Gale (GBR)
3 July	(France) Les Gets	Jordan Williams (GBR)	Izabela Yankova (BUL)
3 July	(France) Les Gets	Lachlan Stevens-McNab (NZL)	Anastasia Thiele (GER)
15 August	(Slovenia) Maribor	Jackson Goldstone (CAN)	Phoebe Gale (GBR)
15 August	(Slovenia) Maribor	Jordan Williams (GBR)	Izabela Yankova (BUL)
15 August	(Slovenia) Maribor	Lachlan Stevens-McNab (NZL)	Aina González (ESP)
4 September	(Switzerland) Lenzerheide	Jackson Goldstone (CAN)	Izabela Yankova (BUL)
4 September	(Switzerland) Lenzerheide	Pau Menoyo (ESP)	Gracey Hemstreet (CAN)
4 September	(Switzerland) Lenzerheide	James MacDermid (NZL)	Kine Haugom (NOR)
15 September	(United States) Snowshoe	Jordan Williams (GBR)	Izabela Yankova (BUL)
15 September	(United States) Snowshoe	Jackson Goldstone (CAN)	Phoebe Gale (GBR)
15 September	(United States) Snowshoe	Tristan Lemire (CAN)	Siel van der Velden (BEL)
18 September	(United States) Snowshoe	Jordan Williams (GBR)	Izabela Yankova (BUL)
18 September	(United States) Snowshoe	Jackson Goldstone (CAN)	Siel van der Velden (BEL)
18 September	(United States) Snowshoe	Oisin O'Callaghan (IRL)	Ella Erickson (USA)

== Cross-country eliminator ==
Date	Venue	Podium (Men)	Podium (Women)
8 August	(Belgium) Leuven	Simon Gegenheimer (GER)	Gaia Tormena (ITA)
8 August	(Belgium) Leuven	Jeroen van Eck (NED)	Lia Schrievers (GER)
8 August	(Belgium) Leuven	Titouan Perrin-Ganier (FRA)	Marion Fromberger (GER)
15 August	(Belgium) Oudenaarde	Lorenzo Serres (FRA)	Gaia Tormena (ITA)
15 August	(Belgium) Oudenaarde	Simon Gegenheimer (GER)	Lia Schrievers (GER)
15 August	(Belgium) Oudenaarde	Anton Olstam (SWE)	Ella Holmegård (SWE)
22 August	(Netherlands) Valkenswaard	Jeroen van Eck (NED)	Gaia Tormena (ITA)
22 August	(Netherlands) Valkenswaard	Anton Olstam (SWE)	Marion Fromberger (GER)
22 August	(Netherlands) Valkenswaard	Simon Gegenheimer (GER)	Ella Holmegård (SWE)
12 September	(Germany) Winterberg	Titouan Perrin-Ganier (FRA)	Gaia Tormena (ITA)
12 September	(Germany) Winterberg	Jeroen van Eck (NED)	Lia Schrievers (GER)
12 September	(Germany) Winterberg	Lorenzo Serres (FRA)	Marion Fromberger (GER)
17 September	(France) Jablines–Annet	Titouan Perrin-Ganier (FRA)	Noémie Garnier (FRA)
17 September	(France) Jablines–Annet	Simon Gegenheimer (GER)	Lia Schrievers (GER)
17 September	(France) Jablines–Annet	Jeroen van Eck (NED)	Marion Fromberger (GER)
2 October	(Spain) Barcelona	Jeroen van Eck (NED)	Gaia Tormena (ITA)
2 October	(Spain) Barcelona	Simon Gegenheimer (GER)	Marion Fromberger (GER)
2 October	(Spain) Barcelona	Lorenzo Serres (FRA)	Didi de Vries (NED)

== E-Mountain Bike Cross-country ==
Date	Venue	Podium (Men)	Podium (Women)
24 April	Monaco–Peille	Jérôme Gilloux (FRA)	Sofia Wiedenroth (GER)
24 April	Monaco–Peille	Joris Ryf (SUI)	Kathrin Stirnemann (SUI)
24 April	Monaco–Peille	Hugo Pigeon (FRA)	Karen Pepper (GBR)
25 April	Monaco–Peille	Jérôme Gilloux (FRA)	Sofia Wiedenroth (GER)
25 April	Monaco–Peille	Joris Ryf (SUI)	Mélanie Pugin (FRA)
25 April	Monaco–Peille	Hugo Pigeon (FRA)	Kathrin Stirnemann (SUI)
5 June	(Italy) Castiglione dei Pepoli	Jérôme Gilloux (FRA)	Nathalie Schneitter (SUI)
5 June	(Italy) Castiglione dei Pepoli	Joris Ryf (SUI)	Mélanie Pugin (FRA)
5 June	(Italy) Castiglione dei Pepoli	Francescu Camoin (FRA)	Karen Pepper (GBR)
6 June	(Italy) Castiglione dei Pepoli	Jérôme Gilloux (FRA)	Mélanie Pugin (FRA)
6 June	(Italy) Castiglione dei Pepoli	Joris Ryf (SUI)	Nathalie Schneitter (SUI)
6 June	(Italy) Castiglione dei Pepoli	Andrea Garibbo (ITA)	Jacqueline Mariacher (AUT)
17 July	(France) Clermont-Ferrand	Joris Ryf (SUI)	Mélanie Pugin (FRA)
17 July	(France) Clermont-Ferrand	Jérôme Gilloux (FRA)	Sofia Wiedenroth (GER)
17 July	(France) Clermont-Ferrand	Théo Charmes (FRA)	Nathalie Schneitter (SUI)
18 July	(France) Clermont-Ferrand	Joris Ryf (SUI)	Nathalie Schneitter (SUI)
18 July	(France) Clermont-Ferrand	Jérôme Gilloux (FRA)	Laura Charles (FRA)
18 July	(France) Clermont-Ferrand	Théo Charmes (FRA)	Mélanie Pugin (FRA)
24 September	(Spain) Girona	Jeroen van Eck (NED)	Sandra Santanyes (ESP)
24 September	(Spain) Girona	Jérôme Gilloux (FRA)	Malene Degn (DEN)
24 September	(Spain) Girona	Théo Charmes (FRA)	Josefina Casadey (ARG)
25 September	(Spain) Girona	Jérôme Gilloux (FRA)	Sandra Santanyes (ESP)
25 September	(Spain) Girona	Joris Ryf (SUI)	Josefina Casadey (ARG)
25 September	(Spain) Girona	Ismael Esteban (ESP)	Ares Masip (ESP)
16 October	(Spain) Castelldefels	Jérôme Gilloux (FRA)	Laura Charles (FRA)
16 October	(Spain) Castelldefels	Joris Ryf (SUI)	Kathrin Stirnemann (SUI)
16 October	(Spain) Castelldefels	Théo Charmes (FRA)	Mélanie Pugin (FRA)

== World Cup standings ==
bold denotes race winners.

=== Cross-country ===
==== Men's ====
**Top 5 Men's Elite Standings**
Rank	Rider	GER (Germany)	CZE (Czech Republic)	AUT (Austria)	FRA (France)	SUI (Switzerland)	USA (United States)	Total Points
1	(Switzerland) **Mathias Flückiger**	230	189	**375**	**375**	260	144	**1573**
2	(France) Victor Koretzky	**350**	133	140	122	**330**	235	**1310**
3	(Czech Republic) Ondřej Cink	176	178	300	280	155	220	**1309**
4	(Switzerland) Nino Schurter	280	155	109	190	270	178	**1182**
5	(France) Jordan Sarrou	155	220	155	260	145	150	**1085**

**Top 5 Men's Under 23 Standings**
Rank	Rider	GER (Germany)	CZE (Czech Republic)	AUT (Austria)	FRA (France)	SUI (Switzerland)	USA (United States)	Total Points
1	(Chile) **Martín Vidaurre**	DNS	DNS	70	70	**90**	**90**	**320**
2	(Italy) Simone Avondetto	60	40	50	**90**	0	70	**310**
3	(Switzerland) Joel Roth	50	50	60	10	60	60	**290**
4	(Canada) Carter Woods	**90**	**90**	40	0	22	14	**256**
5	(Italy) Juri Zanotti	16	30	30	60	70	35	**241**

==== Women's ====
**Top 5 Women's Elite Standings**
Rank	Rider	GER (Germany)	CZE (Czech Republic)	AUT (Austria)	FRA (France)	SUI (Switzerland)	USA (United States)	Total Points
1	(France) **Loana Lecomte**	320	**350**	**375**	**285**	220	DNS	**1550**
2	(United Kingdom) Evie Richards	70	200	155	160	**350**	**375**	**1310**
3	(Sweden) Jenny Rissveds	145	80	275	280	285	210	**1275**
4	(Australia) Rebecca McConnell	129	195	220	166	245	260	**1215**
5	(Switzerland) Sina Frei	150	175	150	220	195	220	**1110**

**Top 5 Women's Under 23 Standings**
Rank	Rider	GER (Germany)	CZE (Czech Republic)	AUT (Austria)	FRA (France)	SUI (Switzerland)	USA (United States)	Total Points
1	(Austria) **Mona Mitterwallner**	**90**	**90**	**90**	**90**	**90**	**90**	**540**
2	(Denmark) Caroline Bohé	70	70	60	70	70	70	**410**
3	(Germany) Leonie Daubermann	50	35	40	60	50	DNS	**235**
4	(Hungary) Kata Blanka Vas	60	60	70	40	DNS	DNS	**230**
5	(Netherlands) Puck Pieterse	30	50	50	50	DNS	DNS	**180**

=== Downhill ===
==== Men's ====
**Top 5 Men's Elite Standings**
Rank	Rider	AUT (Austria)	FRA (France)	SLO (Slovenia)	SUI (Switzerland)	USA (United States)	USA (United States)	Total Points
1	(France) **Loïc Bruni**	81	61	127	185	173	**250**	**877**
2	(France) Thibaut Dapréla	190	**200**	200	162	0	DNS	**752**
3	(France) Loris Vergier	0	66	**250**	**250**	140	7	**713**
4	(Australia) Troy Brosnan	**250**	20	83	13	100	200	**666**
5	(United Kingdom) Reece Wilson	137	28	47	100	**217**	108	**637**

**Top 5 Men's Junior Standings**
Rank	Rider	AUT (Austria)	FRA (France)	SLO (Slovenia)	SUI (Switzerland)	USA (United States)	USA (United States)	Total Points
1	(Canada) **Jackson Goldstone**	40	**60**	**60**	**60**	40	40	**300**
2	(United Kingdom) Jordan Williams	25	40	40	25	**60**	**60**	**250**
3	(Spain) Pau Menoyo	**60**	14	14	40	0	18	**146**
4	(New Zealand) Lachlan Stevens-McNab	20	30	30	DNS	16	14	**110**
5	(Canada) Tristan Lemire	0	10	20	18	30	25	**103**

==== Women's ====
**Top 5 Women's Elite Standings**
Rank	Rider	AUT (Austria)	FRA (France)	SLO (Slovenia)	SUI (Switzerland)	USA (United States)	USA (United States)	Total Points
1	(Austria) **Valentina Höll**	210	120	145	170	**230**	**250**	**1125**
2	(France) Myriam Nicole	110	210	**240**	**250**	175	94	**1079**
3	(Switzerland) Camille Balanche	**220**	170	170	135	200	170	**1065**
4	(United Kingdom) Tahnée Seagrave	122	214	126	200	124	150	**936**
5	(France) Marine Cabirou	155	DNS	65	111	160	200	**691**

**Top 5 Women's Junior Standings**
Rank	Rider	AUT (Austria)	FRA (France)	SLO (Slovenia)	SUI (Switzerland)	USA (United States)	USA (United States)	Total Points
1	(Bulgaria) **Izabela Yankova**	20	40	40	**60**	**60**	**60**	**280**
2	(United Kingdom) Phoebe Gale	DNS	**60**	**60**	10	40	DNS	**170**
3	(Austria) Sophie Gutöhrle	**60**	DNS	10	DNS	DNS	DNS	**70**
4	(Belgium) Siel van der Velden	0	0	0	0	20	40	**60**
5	(France) Léona Pierrini	40	5	0	5	DNS	DNS	**50**

=== Cross-country eliminator ===
**Top 5 Men's Elite Standings**
Rank	Rider	BEL (Belgium)	BEL (Belgium)	NED (Netherlands)	GER (Germany)	FRA (France)	ESP (Spain)	Total Points
1	(Netherlands) **Jeroen van Eck**	60	34	**90**	60	41	**80**	**365**
2	(Germany) Simon Gegenheimer	**90**	60	43	37	52	55	**337**
3	(France) Titouan Perrin-Ganier	43	32	0	**73**	**73**	28	**249**
4	(France) Lorenzo Serres	32	**69**	DNS	45	50	43	**239**
5	(Sweden) Anton Olstam	6	43	60	21	13	55	**198**

**Top 5 Women's Elite Standings**
Rank	Rider	BEL (Belgium)	BEL (Belgium)	NED (Netherlands)	GER (Germany)	FRA (France)	ESP (Spain)	Total Points
1	(Italy) **Gaia Tormena**	**90**	**90**	**90**	**90**	DNS	**90**	**450**
2	(Germany) Marion Fromberger	50	45	60	43	43	55	**296**
3	(Germany) Lia Schrievers	53	55	DNS	55	55	0	**218**
4	(Netherlands) Didi de Vries	33	32	38	0	45	50	**198**
5	(Sweden) Ella Holmegård	23	43	45	45	32	0	**188**

=== E-Mountain Bike Cross-country ===
Top 5 Men's Standings
Rank	Rider	MON (Monaco)	MON (Monaco)	ITA (Italy)	ITA (Italy)	FRA (France)	FRA (France)	ESP (Spain)	ESP (Spain)	ESP (Spain)	Total Points
1	(France) **Jérôme Gilloux**	**25**	**25**	**25**	**25**	20	20	20	**25**	**25**	**210**
2	(Switzerland) Joris Ryf	20	20	20	20	**25**	**25**	13	20	20	**183**
3	(France) Théo Charmes	9	11	13	11	16	16	16	10	16	**118**
4	(Netherlands) Jeroen van Eck	5	7	2	6	9	10	**25**	DNF	11	**75**
5	(France) Francescu Camoin	13	13	16	13	0	13	DNS	DNS	DNS	**68**

Top 5 Women's Standings
Rank	Rider	MON (Monaco)	MON (Monaco)	ITA (Italy)	ITA (Italy)	FRA (France)	FRA (France)	ESP (Spain)	ESP (Spain)	ESP (Spain)	Total Points
1	(France) **Mélanie Pugin**	11	20	20	**25**	**25**	16	DNS	DNS	16	**133**
2	(Switzerland) Nathalie Schneitter	DNS	DNS	**25**	20	16	**25**	DNS	DNS	DNS	**86**
3	(Germany) Sofia Wiedenroth	**25**	**25**	DNS	DNS	20	13	DNS	DNS	DNS	**83**
4	(United Kingdom) Karen Pepper	16	13	16	11	11	10	DNS	DNS	DNS	**77**
5	(Switzerland) Kathrin Stirnemann	20	16	DNS	DNS	0	11	DNS	DNS	20	**67**

== See also ==
- 2021 UCI Mountain Bike World Championships
