= François-Joseph Chaussegros de Léry =

François, Vicomte de Léry
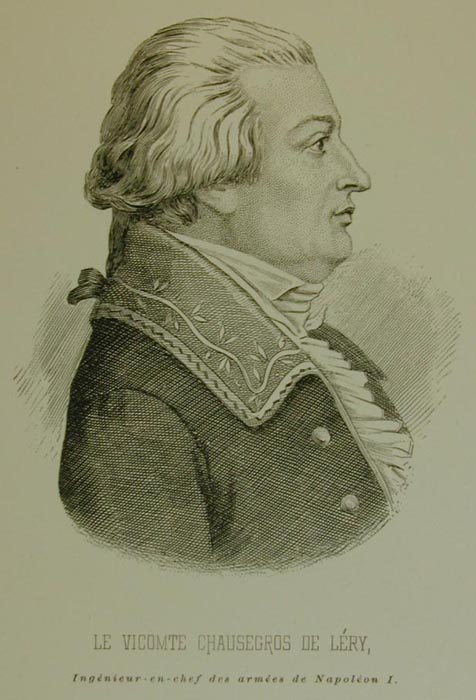

Engineer-in-Chief of Napoleon's Armies
- In office 1794–1815

Personal details
- Born: September 11, 1754 Quebec City, New France
- Died: September 5, 1824 (aged 69) Château des Bergeries, Chartrettes
- Spouse: Marie-Cécile de Kellermann

Général François-Joseph d'Estienne Chaussegros de Léry (9 September 1754 - 5 September 1824) was the Canadian Engineer-in-Chief of Napoleon's Armies and Commander-in-Chief of Napoleon's Armies in the Netherlands. On his death, his name was on the list of officers being considered to fill the position of Marshal of France. He was created a Baron d'Empire and on the restoration of Louis XVIII he was created Vicomte de Léry and given the Grand Cross of the Legion of Honour. He is one of the 660 personalities whose names are engraved on the Arc de Triomphe at Paris.

== Early life ==
Born 1754 at Quebec City, he was one of the eighteen children of The Hon. Gaspard-Joseph Chaussegros de Léry (1721-1797) and his wife Louise, daughter of François Martel de Brouague (1692-1761), Commandant of the Coast of Labrador, and niece of Louis-Philippe Mariauchau d'Esgly, 8th Bishop of Quebec. In 1763, his parents were the first French Canadian couple to be presented to the English Court, drawing the compliment from King George III that if all Canadian ladies resembled his mother, Mme de Léry, then his father had made une belle conquete.

He came from a notable Québécois family: He was a grandson of Gaspard-Joseph Chaussegros de Léry (1682-1756) and a nephew of the Marquis de Lotbinière. He was a brother of The Hon. Louis-René Chaussegros de Léry, The Hon. Charles-Étienne Chaussegros de Léry and Mme. Jacques-Philippe Saveuse de Beaujeu.

== Career ==
In 1763, after the British Conquest of New France, accompanied by his parents he left Quebec and by way of England came to Paris. He was educated by the Benedictines, where he learnt English, the sciences, mathematics and physics. Following family tradition, in early 1773 he began his training as a military engineer at the Grande École Militaire at Mézières.

From 1780 to 1790, his early military career as an engineer was passed at La Fère and Brest before he was posted overseas to Martinique, Guadeloupe and the Islands of Tobago. By 1790, he had been noticed by Napoleon. He was promoted to Lieutenant and made a Chevalier de Saint-Louis. During the Napoleonic Wars his career advanced rapidly as he was successively given a Bataillon; promoted to Brigade General (1795), Général des Armées du Roi (1805) and Inspector General of Fortifications.

In 1811, he was created a Baron d'Empire and given an estate in Westphalia. Napoleon made him Commander-in-Chief of the Armies of the former Kingdom of Holland and he was given a division in Austria that formed part of the army that fought at the Battle of Austerlitz. He was made a Grand Officer of the Legion of Honour as Commandant du Génie in Italy and Spain in 1813. In 1818, on the restoration of Louis XVIII, Chaussegros de Léry was created Vicomte de Léry and given the Grand Cross of the Legion of Honour.

In 1801, he had married Marie Cécile (1773-1850), daughter of Général François Christophe de Kellermann, 1st Duc de Valmy; Marshal of France. She was the sister of François Étienne de Kellermann, 2nd Duc de Valmy. In 1818, he retired with his wife to Château d'Etry at Annet-sur-Marne, where he was Mayor from 1821 to 1824.

In 1824, he died at the Château des Bergeries, Chartrettes, while visiting his friend and relation, Le Comte de Marchais. He is buried at Annet-sur-Marne. On his death, his name was on the list of officers being considered for the position of Marshal of France. He is one of the 660 personalities whose names are engraved on the Arc de Triomphe at Paris.

== See also ==
- Canadian peers and baronets
