= Jérôme Gilloux =

French cyclist (born 1994)

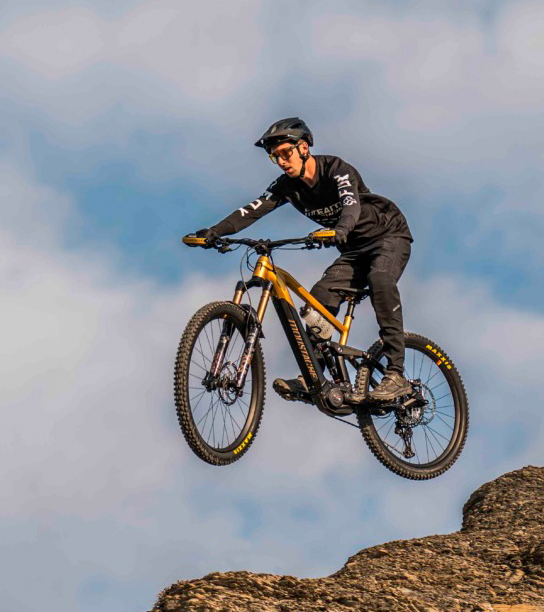
- Gilloux in 2021

Personal information
- Born: 22 May 1994 (age 32) France

Cycling career
- Sport: Cycling
- Discipline: E-mountain bike racing
- Role: Rider
Medal record
Representing France
Mountain bike racing
World Championships
| Gold medal – first place | 2021 Val di Sole | E-MTB Cross-country |
| Gold medal – first place | 2022 Les Gets | E-MTB Cross-country |
| Gold medal – first place | 2024 Vallnord | E-MTB Cross-country |
| Gold medal – first place | 2025 Valais | E-MTB Cross-country |
| Silver medal – second place | 2019 Leogang | E-MTB Cross-country |
| Silver medal – second place | 2020 Mont Sainte-Anne | E-MTB Cross-country |

Jérôme Gilloux (born 22 May 1994) is a French mountain biker specialising in the e-MTB event.

Gilloux was born on 22 May 1994. At the inaugural e-MTB world championship in 2019, he finished second after Alan Hatherly from South Africa. At the 2020 UCI Mountain Bike World Championships he again placed second, this time beaten by the United Kingdom's Tom Pidcock. At the 2021 UCI Mountain Bike World Championships, he took the world championship title. He defended his world championship title at the 2022 UCI Mountain Bike World Championships.

== Major results ==
2019
1st Cross-country, National E-MTB Championships
2nd Cross-country, UCI World E-MTB Championships
2020
1st Cross-country, National E-MTB Championships
1st Monaco, UCI E-MTB World Cup
2nd Cross-country, UCI World E-MTB Championships
2021
1st Cross-country, UCI World E-MTB Championships
1st Overall UCI E-MTB World Cup

1st Monaco–Peille I
1st Monaco–Peille II
1st Castiglione dei Pepoli I
1st Castiglione dei Pepoli II
1st Girona I
1st Castelldefels
2nd Girona II
2nd Clermont-Ferrand I
2nd Clermont-Ferrand II

2022
1st Cross-country, UCI World E-MTB Championships
1st Overall UCI E-MTB World Cup

1st Monaco–Peille I
1st Monaco–Peille II
1st Monghidoro–Bologna I
1st Monghidoro–Bologna II
1st Charade–Clermont-Ferrand II
1st Spa-Francorchamps I
1st Spa-Francorchamps II
1st Costa Brava–Girona I
2nd Costa Brava–Girona II

2024
1st Cross-country, UCI World E-MTB Championships
