= Joel Roth =

Joel Roth may refer to:

- Joel Roth (rabbi), American rabbi in the Rabbinical Assembly
- Joel Roth (cyclist) (born 1999), Swiss cyclist

== See also ==
- Joe Roth (born 1948), American film executive, producer, and director
