= Reece Wilson =

Scottish mountain biker

Personal information
- Born: 11 June 1996 (age 30)

Cycling career
- Sport: Cycling
- Discipline: Downhill
- Role: Rider
Medal record
Representing United Kingdom
Mountain bike racing
World Championships
Gold medal – first place	2020 Leogang	Downhill

Reece Wilson (born 11 June 1996) is a Scottish downhill mountain biker. In 2020, he won the MTB World Championships in Leogang, Austria. Wilson rode for the Trek Factory Downhill Team for the 2019 and 2020 seasons.

== Major results ==
2020
1st Downhill, UCI Mountain Bike World Championships
2021
UCI Downhill World Cup

1st Snowshoe
