= Christopher Blevins =

American cyclist (born 1998)

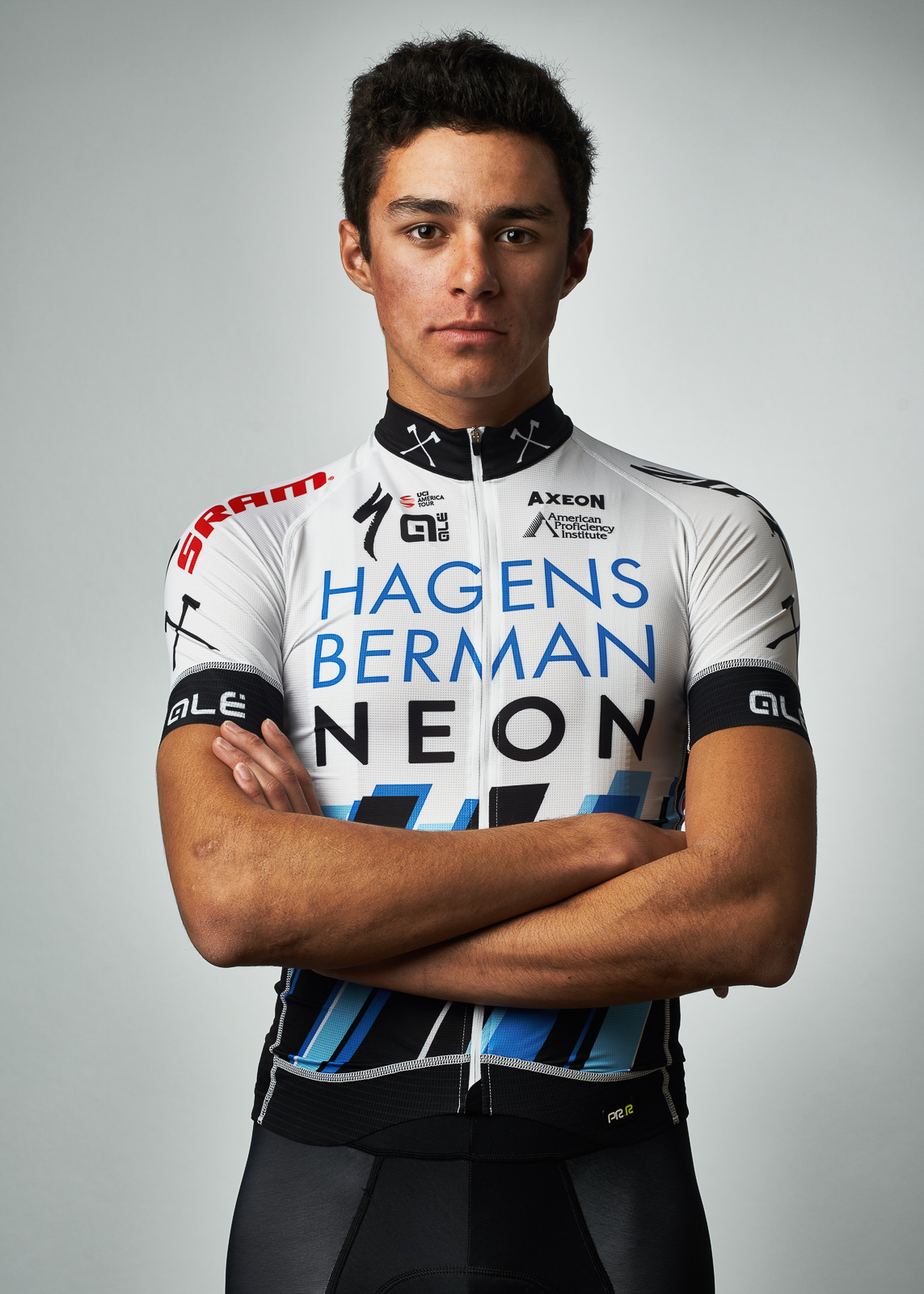
- Blevins in 2017

Personal information
- Born: March 14, 1998 (age 28) Durango, Colorado, United States

Cycling career
- Sport: Cycling
- Current team: Specialized Factory Racing
- Disciplines: Mountain bike; Road; Cyclo-cross
- Role: Rider

Professional teams
- 2017–2018: Axeon–Hagens Berman
- 2017–2020: Specialized Racing
- 2021: Trinity Racing
- 2022–: Specialized Factory Racing

Major wins
- Mountain bike World Short Track Championships (2021) XC World Cup (2025) 5 individual wins (2021, 2024, 2025) Cape Epic (2023)
Medal record
Representing United States
Men's mountain bike racing
World Championships
Gold medal – first place	2021 Val di Sole	Cross-country Short Track
Gold medal – first place	2024 Vallnord	Mixed relay
Silver medal – second place	2021 Val di Sole	Team relay
Silver medal – second place	2018 Lenzerheide	Under-23 Cross-country
Silver medal – second place	2020 Leogang	Under-23 Cross-country
Silver medal – second place	2019 Mont Saint-Anne	Cross-country Team relay
Bronze medal – third place	2021 Val di Sole	Electric MTB Cross-country
Men's cross-country marathon
World Championships
Silver medal – second place	2024 Snowshoe	Men's

Christopher Blevins (born March 14, 1998) is an American cyclist, who currently rides for UCI Mountain Bike Team Specialized Factory Racing. Specializing in cross-country mountain biking, Blevins has also previously competed in road cycling (for Hagens Berman Axeon) and cyclo-cross, before choosing to solely focus on mountain biking in preparation for the 2020 Summer Olympics.

== Biography ==
=== Early life ===
Blevins was born on March 14, 1998, in Durango, Colorado, son of Field and Priscilla His father is an orthopedic surgeon with a specialty in sports medicine and his older sister Kaylee was also a member of the U.S. National mountain bike team. He went to college in San Luis Obispo, CA graduating from Cal Poly in 2021 with a degree in business administration with a concentration in entrepreneurship. Additionally, he teaches voluntarily spoken-word poetry in a local juvenile hall and is a lyricist of rap music.

=== Career ===
Blevins began participating in the sport of cycling at the age of five by competing in BMX races. He managed to win eight national championships in the age divisions between elementary and high school. His BMX career ended at the age of sixteen however, and by the age of twelve he had already begun to compete in both mountain bike and road cycling. He had great success from the ages of thirteen to nineteen where he won the national Cross Country championship in his age group. At sixteen he was able to win the road cycling national championship as well.

When Blevins turned eighteen he won one of the most important races of the junior category in road cycling, the famous Course de la Paix. This race provided him the opportunity to join the team Axeon–Hagens Berman. In the same year, he signed another contract with the Specialized Racing team to participate in the U23 World Cross-Country Championship. In 2018 he managed to win the U23 national cyclo-cross championship. In the same age group, he finished 2nd in the World Cross-Country Championship and also won a stage of the Tour of the Gila. In 2019, aiming for the 2020 Olympics in Tokyo, he decided to dedicate himself to mountain biking. At the 2020 U23 World Cross-Country Championship he finished 2nd and after the postponing of the Olympic Games due to COVID-19, he signed a 2021 contract with Trinity Racing.

In August 2021, he became the inaugural men's cross-country short track world champion, taking the title at the 2021 UCI Mountain Bike World Championships in Val di Sole, Italy. He also won his first UCI XCO World Cup round, in Snowshoe, West Virginia, that year.

He won the 2023 Cape Epic alongside Matthew Beers. He opened up his 2024 season with a win in the Low Gap Hopper gravel race in California. In April, he won the first round of the UCI XCO World Cup in Mairiporã, Brazil.

== Major results ==
=== Mountain bike ===
2015
2nd Team relay, Pan American Championships
2016
1st Cross-country, National Junior Championships
2017
1st Cross-country, National Under-23 Championships
2018
2nd Cross-country, UCI World Under-23 Championships
3rd Cross-country, National Championships
2019
Pan American Championships

1st Under-23 Cross-country
2nd Team relay

2nd Team relay, UCI World Championships
2020
2nd Cross-country, UCI World Under-23 Championships
UCI Under-23 XCO World Cup

2nd Nové Město II

2021
UCI World Championships

1st Short track
2nd Team relay

UCI XCO World Cup

1st Snowshoe

3rd Cross-country, UCI World E-MTB Championships
2022
UCI XCC World Cup

1st Snowshoe

2nd Cross-country, National Championships
3rd Team relay, UCI World Championships
3rd Overall Cape Epic (with Matthew Beers)
2023
1st Overall Cape Epic (with Matthew Beers)

1st Prologue & Stages 2, 3, 4 & 6

UCI XCC World Cup

3rd Mont-Sainte-Anne

2024
Pan American Championships

1st Cross-country
2nd Short track

UCI XCO World Cup

1st Mairiporã

2nd Marathon, UCI World Championships
UCI XCC World Cup

2nd Araxá
2nd Nové Město

2025
1st Overall UCI XCO World Cup

1st Araxá I
1st Nové Město
1st Lake Placid

1st Overall UCI XCC World Cup

1st Araxá I
1st Araxá II
1st Nové Město
1st Leogang
1st Val di Sole
1st Lake Placid
2nd Pal–Arinsal

2nd Short track, UCI World Championships

=== Road ===
2015
1st Stage 4 Tour de l'Abitibi
6th Overall Trofeo Karlsberg

1st Mountains classification

2016
1st Overall Course de la Paix Juniors
2018
4th Overall San Dimas Stage Race

1st Stage 2

9th Overall Tour of the Gila

1st Points classification
1st Stage 2

=== Cyclo-cross ===
2014–2015
3rd Pan American Junior Championships
2017–2018
1st National Under-23 Championships
Under-23 CXLA Weekend

1st Day 1 & 2

2021–2022
USCX Series

3rd Baltimore II

=== Gravel ===
2023
2nd Low Gap Hopper
2nd Belgian Waffle Ride Arizona
3rd Sea Otter Classic Fuego XL
2024
1st Low Gap Hopper
