= Nadir Colledani =

Italian cyclist (born 1995)

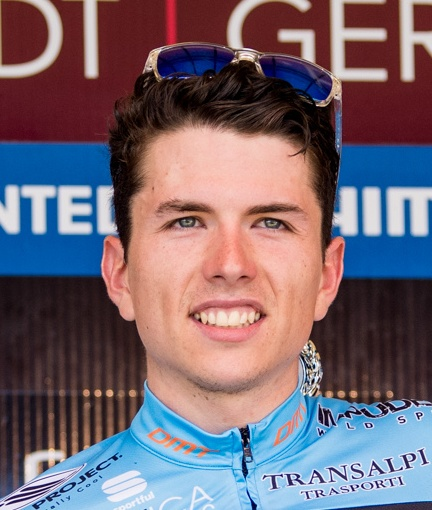
- Nadir Colledani in 2017.

Personal information
- Born: 10 April 1995 (age 31) San Daniele del Friuli

Cycling career
- Sport: Cycling
- Disciplines: Mountain bike Cyclo-cross
- Role: Rider
- Rider type: Cross-country

Nadir Colledani (born 10 April 1995) is an Italian cyclo-cross and cross-country mountain biker. He finished 8th at the 2020 UCI Cross-country World Championships.

== Major results ==
=== Cyclo-cross ===
2011–2012
3rd National Junior Championships
3rd Gran Premio Mamma E Papa Guerciotti Juniors
2012–2013
2nd Gran Premio Mamma E Papa Guerciotti Juniors
2nd Ciclocross del Ponte Juniors
3rd National Junior Championships
2014–2015
1st National Under-23 Championships
Giro d'Italia Cross

3rd Padova
3rd Isola d'Elba

2015–2016
1st National Under-23 Championships
Giro d'Italia Cross

2nd Roma
2nd Fiuggi
2nd Montalto di Castro

2016–2017
3rd National Under-23 Championships
3rd Igorre
3rd Trofeo San Andres
2018–2019
2nd Trofeo di Gorizia
2021–2022
1st Gran Premio Internazionale di Jesolo

=== MTB ===
2015
2nd National Under-23 XCO Championships
2016
2nd National Under-23 XCO Championships
2017
2nd European Under-23 XCO Championships
2nd National Under-23 XCO Championships
2nd European Team Relay Championships
2020
8th UCI World XCO Championships
2021
1st National XCO Championships
