= 2017 European Mountain Bike Championships =

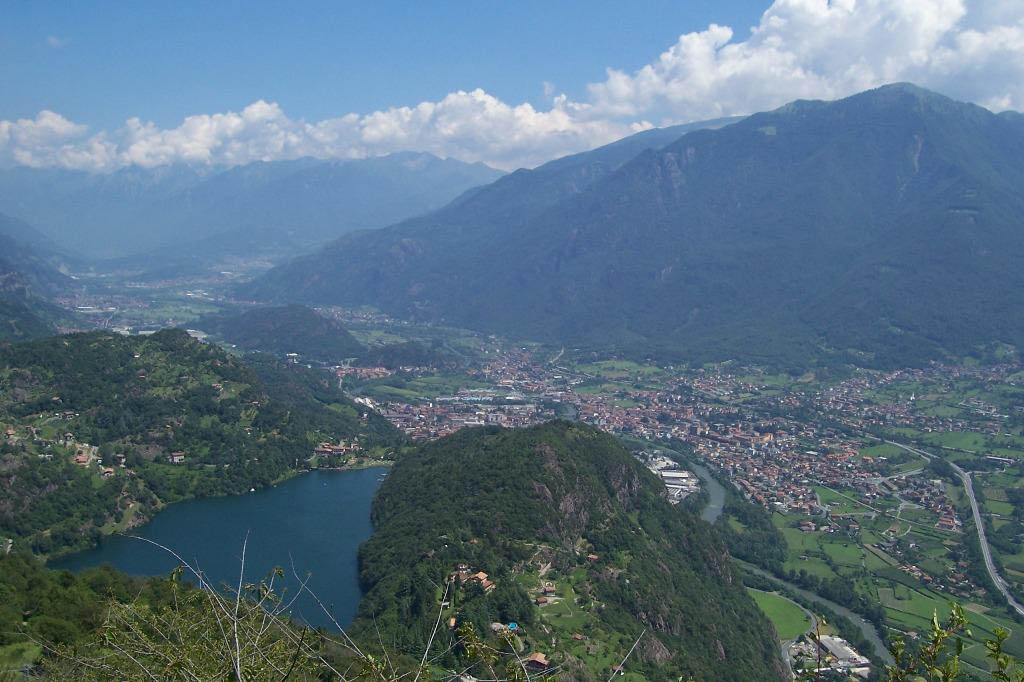
- Venue: Boario Terme Italy
- Date(s): 27-30 July 2017
- Coordinates: 45°53′40″N 10°11′12″E
- Events: 5 (senior)

The 2017 European Mountain Bike Championships were held in Darfo Boario Terme, Italy, from 27 to 30 July 2017.

== Medal summary ==
=== Cross-country ===
Event	Gold	Silver	Bronze
Elite
Men	Florian Vogel (SUI)	Julien Absalon (FRA)	Manuel Fumic (GER)
Women	Yana Belomoyna (UKR)	Linda Indergand (SUI)	Gunn-Rita Dahle Flesjå (NOR)
Mixed relay	(SUI); Filippo Colombo; Joel Roth; Linda Indergand; Alessandra Keller; Andri Frischknecht	(DEN); Sebastian Carstensen Fini; Alexander Andersen; Caroline Bohé; Simon Andreassen; Malene Degn	(ITA); Gerhard Kerschbaumer; Chiara Teocchi; Juri Zanotti; Marika Tovo; Nadir Colledani
Under-23
Men	Gioele Bertolini (ITA)	Nadir Colledani (ITA)	Simon Andreassen (DEN)
Women	Sina Frei (SUI)	Alessandra Keller (SUI)	Anne Tauber (NED)
Juniors
Boys	Jofre Cullell (ESP)	Alexandre Balmer (SUI)	Benjamin Le Ny (FRA)
Girls	Laura Stigger (AUT)	Loana Lecomte (FRA)	Caroline Bohé (DEN)

=== Cross-country eliminator ===
Event	Gold	Silver	Bronze
Elite
Men	Titouan Perrin-Ganier (FRA)	Daniel Federspiel (AUT)	Jeroen van Eck (NED)
Women	Kathrin Stirnemann (SUI)	Barbora Průdková (CZE)	Anne Terpstra (NED)
