= Caroline Bohé =

Danish cyclist (born 1999)

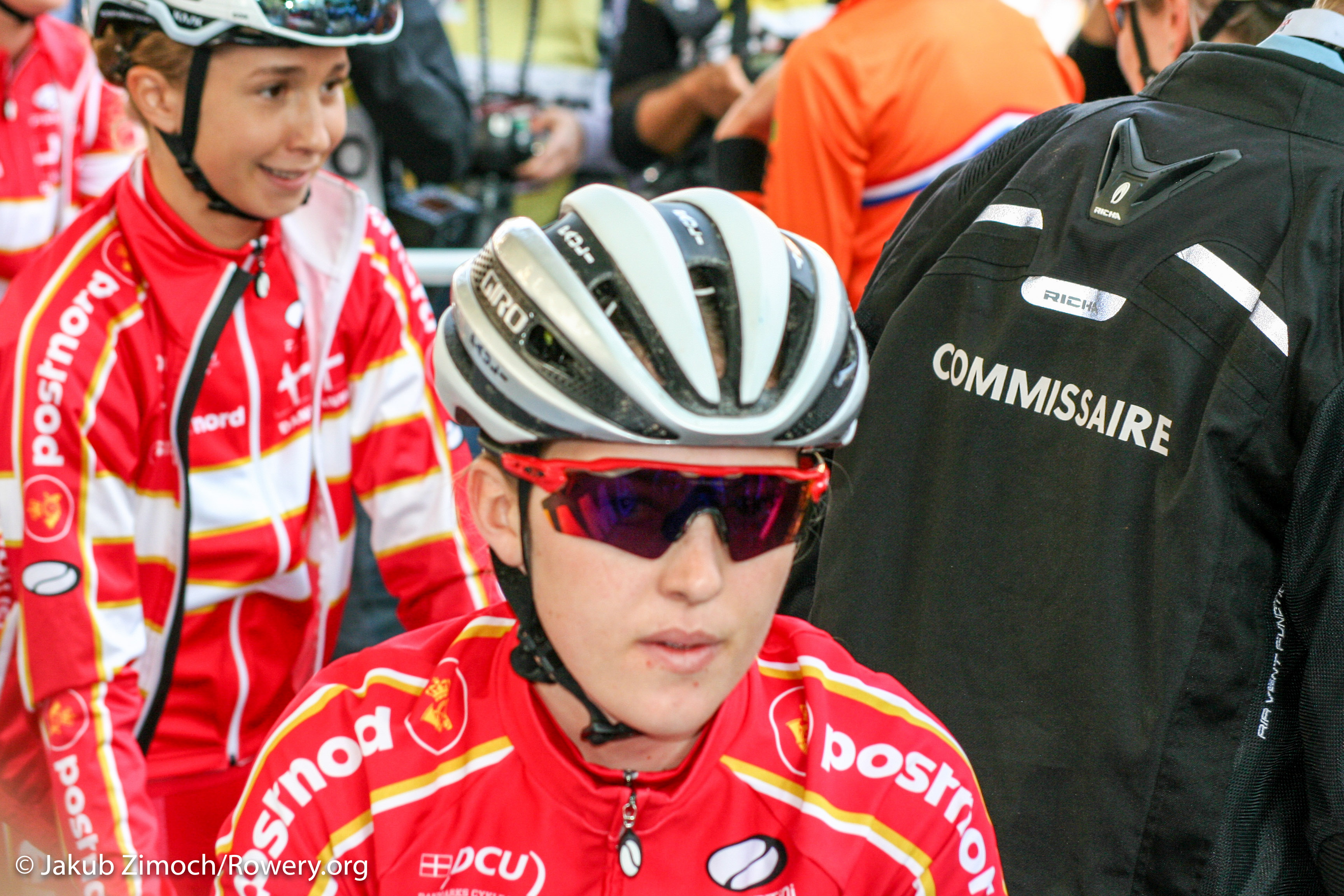
- Bohé in 2018

Personal information
- Born: 23 July 1999 (age 27) Hillerød, Denmark

Cycling career
- Sport: Cycling
- Current team: Ghost Factory Racing
- Disciplines: Road; Cyclo-cross; Mountain biking
- Role: Rider

Professional team
- 2020–: Ghost Factory Racing
Medal record
Representing Denmark
Women's mountain bike racing
World Championships
Bronze medal – third place	2021 Val di Sole	Under-23 cross-country
Bronze medal – third place	2023 Glasgow	Mixed relay
European Championships
Silver medal – second place	2017 Darfo Boario Terme	Mixed relay
Silver medal – second place	2018 Glasgow	Mixed relay
Bronze medal – third place	2019 Brno	Mixed relay
Bronze medal – third place	2017 Darfo Boario Terme	Junior cross-country
Bronze medal – third place	2016 Huskvarna	Junior cross-country

Caroline Bohé (born 23 July 1999) is a Danish racing cyclist. She rode in the women's road race event at the 2018 UCI Road World Championships. She also competed in the cross-country race at the 2020 and 2024 Summer Olympics.

== Major results ==
=== Mountain bike ===
2015
1st Cross-country, National Junior Championships
2016
1st Cross-country, National Junior Championships
3rd European Junior Championships
2017
1st Cross-country, National Junior Championships
European Championships

2nd Mixed relay
3rd Junior cross-country

2018
2nd Mixed relay, European Championships
3rd Cross-country, National Championships
5th Cross-country, UCI Under-23 World Championships
2019
3rd Mixed relay, European Championships
2021
1st Cross-country, National Championships
2nd Overall UCI Under-23 XCO World Cup

2nd Les Gets
2nd Nové Město
2nd Lenzerheide
2nd Snowshoe
2nd Albstadt
3rd Leogang

3rd Cross-country, UCI Under-23 World Championships
2022
UCI XCC World Cup

3rd Leogang

5th Cross-country, European Championships
2023
3rd Mixed relay, UCI Under-23 World Championships

=== Cyclo-cross ===
2015–2016
1st National Championships
3rd Kronborg
2016–2017
1st Overall Kronborg

2nd Day 2
3rd Day 1

2nd National Championships
2017–2018
2nd National Championships
2019–2019
1st National Championships
2019–2020
1st National Championships
2020–2021
1st National Championships
2021–2022
1st National Championships
2022–2023
1st National Championships

=== Virtual ===
10th UCI Esports World Championships
