= Frederick Orr-Lewis =

Canadian businessman

Sir Frederick Orr-Lewis Bt
- Born: 11 February 1860; Hamilton, Canada West
- Died: 18 November 1921 (aged 61); France
- Occupation: Businessman
- Spouse: Maude Booth (m. 1896)

Sir Frederick Orr Orr-Lewis, 1st Baronet (11 February 1860 – 18 November 1921) was a Canadian businessman.

Orr-Lewis (he used both names as a surname, sometimes hyphenated) was born in Hamilton, Canada West, and raised in Montreal, Canada East. He was the son of William Thomas Lewis, a Welsh immigrant. He joined his father's business, Lewis Brothers, and eventually became president. He was also instrumental in setting up and became president of Canadian Vickers Ltd, the Canadian arm of the British shipbuilding and armaments giant, Vickers. Many Royal Navy ships were built in the company's Canadian yards during the First World War, and for this, in the 1920 New Year Honours, Orr-Lewis was created a baronet.

In 1896, Orr-Lewis married Maude Booth. Orr-Lewis survived the sinking of RMS Lusitania on 7 May 1915, but his health was irreparably damaged. Orr-Lewis died at his villa in the south of France on 18 November 1921. He was succeeded in the baronetcy by his only son, Duncan. Orr-Lewis was survived by his wife, son Duncan, and daughters Helen and Mary. As well as a home in Montreal and the villa in France, Orr-Lewis also had an estate at Whitewebbs Park, Enfield, England.

== Footnotes ==
Baronetage of the United Kingdom
New creation	Baronet (of Whitewebbs Park); 1920–1921	Succeeded by Duncan Orr-Lewis
