= Orr-Lewis baronets =

Extinct baronetcy in the Baronetage of the United Kingdom

The Orr-Lewis Baronetcy, of Whitewebbs Park in the parish of Enfield in the County of Middlesex, was a title in the Baronetage of the United Kingdom. It was created on 12 February 1920 for the Canadian businessman Frederick Orr-Lewis. The title became extinct on the death of his only son Duncan, the second Baronet, in 1980.

Frederick Orr-Lewis owned the 100 hectares (250 acres) estate of Whitewebbs Park in Enfield. In 1931, his son Duncan sold the estate to the County Council, which constructed a public golf course on the property. The Estate House, which dates to 1791, is now a public restaurant and two estate lodges remain.

== Orr-Lewis baronets, of Whitewebbs Park (1920) ==
- Sir Frederick Orr Orr-Lewis, 1st Baronet (1866–1921)
- Sir (John) Duncan Orr-Lewis, 2nd Baronet (1898–1980)

Coat of arms of Orr-Lewis of Whitewebbs Park
Coronet Patriae fidius (Faithful to fatherland) Crest 1st, a lion sejant supporting with the dexter foreleg a banner Sable, charged with a lion rampant Argent (Lewis); 2nd, Out of the battlements of a tower Argent a dexter cubit arm Proper, holding in the hand a cross-crosslet Or (Orr). Escutcheon Quarterly, 1st and 4th: Per chevron Argent and Sable, in chief three spear-heads Gules and in base a lion rampant of the First (Lewis); 2nd and 3rd: Ermine, three piles Gules, issuant from a chief Or, thereon an annulet of the Second between two maple leaves Vert (Orr). Motto Crests— 1st, a lion sejant supporting with the dexter foreleg a banner sable, charged with a lion rampant argent, Lezvis ', 2nd, out of the battlements of a tower argent a dexter cubit arm proper, holding in the hand a cross-crosslet or, Orr.
