= Joel Roth (cyclist) =

Swiss cyclist (born 1999)

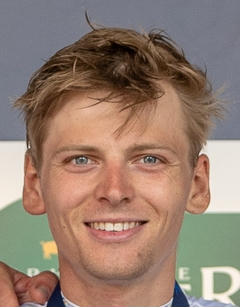
- Roth in 2021

Personal information
- Born: 8 January 1999 (age 27)

Cycling career
- Sport: Cycling
- Discipline: Cross-country
- Role: Rider
Medal record
Representing Switzerland
Men's Mountain bike racing
World Championships
Gold medal – first place	2017 Cairns	Team relay
Gold medal – first place	2019 Mont-Sainte-Anne	Team relay
Silver medal – second place	2017 Cairns	Junior Cross-country
Bronze medal – third place	2020 Leogang	Under-23 Cross-country
Bronze medal – third place	2021 Val di Sole	Under-23 Cross-country
European Championships
Gold medal – first place	2020 Monteceneri	Under-23 Cross-country
Gold medal – first place	2021 Novi Sad	Under-23 Cross-country
Gold medal – first place	2017 Darfo Boario Terme	Team relay
Gold medal – first place	2019 Brno	Team relay

Joel Roth (born 8 January 1999) is a Swiss cyclist, who specializes in cross-country mountain biking.

== Major results ==
2017
1st UCI World Team Relay Championships
1st European Team Relay Championships
2nd UCI Junior XCO World Championships
2019
1st UCI World Team Relay Championships
1st European Team Relay Championships
2020
1st European Under-23 XCO Championships
1st National Under-23 XCO Championships
3rd UCI Under-23 XCO World Championships
2021
1st European Under-23 XCO Championships
3rd UCI Under-23 XCO World Championships
3rd Overall UCI Under-23 XCO World Cup

3rd Leogang
3rd Lenzerheide
3rd Snowshoe

2022
Swiss Bike Cup

3rd Gränichen

2024
Swiss Bike Cup

2nd Echallens
