= Chartrettes =

- Commune
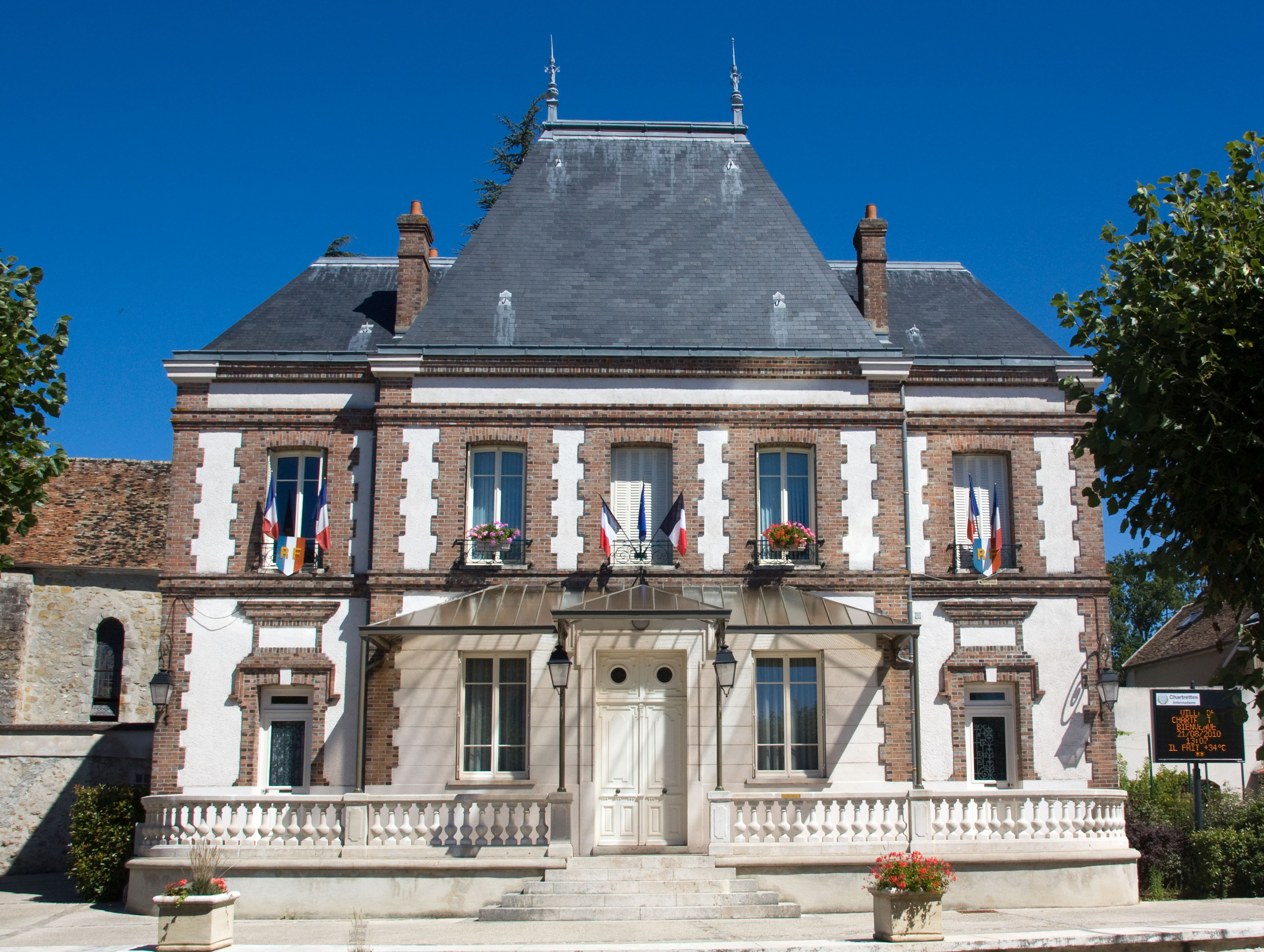
- The town hall in Chartrettes

- Coat of arms
- Location of Chartrettes
- Location within France Location within Île-de-France (region)
- Coordinates: 48°29′24″N 2°42′02″E
- Country: France
- Region: Île-de-France
- Department: Seine-et-Marne
- Arrondissement: Fontainebleau
- Canton: Nangis
- Intercommunality: CA Pays de Fontainebleau

Government
  - Mayor (2020–2026): Pascal Gros
- Area^{1}: 10.10 km^{2} (3.90 sq mi)
- Highest elevation: 94 m (308 ft)
- Lowest elevation: 37 m (121 ft)
- Population (2023): 2,633
  - Density: 260.7/km^{2} (675.2/sq mi)
- Time zone: UTC+01:00 (CET)
  - Summer (DST): UTC+02:00 (CEST)
- INSEE/Postal code: 77096 /77590
- ^{1} French Land Register data, which excludes lakes, ponds, glaciers > 1 km^{2} (0.386 sq mi or 247 acres) and river estuaries.

Chartrettes (French pronunciation: [ʃaʁtʁɛt]) is a commune in the Seine-et-Marne department in the Île-de-France region in north-central France. The commune is located to the west of the Seine and shares 2 bridges to the neighbouring Bois-Le-Roi.

== Weather ==
During winter the expected temperature for Chartrettes is 0–7 °C (32–45 °F). During spring and autumn it is 5–11 °C (41–52 °F)). During summer it has a huge bracket from 7–30 °C (45–86 °F). It is highly unlikely to snow. It is very humid and sunny. It hardly ever rains and winds reach 32 km/h (20 mph).

== Population ==
Historical population
Year	Pop.	±% p.a.
1968	1,115	—
1975	1,135	+0.25%
1982	1,561	+4.66%
1990	2,114	+3.86%
1999	2,391	+1.38%
2007	2,527	+0.69%
2012	2,588	+0.48%
2017	2,554	−0.26%
2023	2,633	+0.51%
Source: INSEE

The inhabitants are called Chartrettois in French.

== Twin towns – sister cities ==
- (Republic of Ireland) Roscommon, Ireland

== See also ==
- Communes of the Seine-et-Marne department
