= Izabela Yankova =

Bulgarian cyclist

Personal information
- Born: 23 June 2004 (age 22)

Cycling career
- Sport: Cycling
- Discipline: Downhill
- Role: Rider
Medal record
Women's mountain bike racing
Representing Bulgaria
World Championships
Gold medal – first place	2021 Val di Sole	Junior downhill

Izabela Yankova (born 23 June 2004) is a Bulgarian downhill mountain biker. Yankova won the 2021 UCI Mountain Bike World Championships in the Junior Women's category. She is the first Bulgarian cyclist to win a World Championship event. Yankova competed in the Women's High Performance Sport category at the IXS European Downhill Cup, clinching the series overall at the final in Maribor, Slovenia.
