= Charlotte-Françoise de Saint-Laurent =

Charlotte-Françoise de Saint-Laurent (1660–1732), born Charlotte-Françoise Juchereau de Saint-Denis, was a French-Canadian feudal countess, fief holder and business person.

Her brother was the soldier and explorer, Louis Juchereau de St. Denis.

In 1702, she purchased the island Île d'Orléans, which was formally the feudal fief county of Saint-Laurent, thereby making her ruling countess de Saint-Laurent in her own right. She kept her title even after her marriage, and also secured her son's right to it as her successor. To hold a noble title and a feudal fief, particularly after marriage, was most unusual and controversial for a woman, and even more so in the colony of Canada, where her right to it was questioned and she was sued as an usurper to it in court. Until 1713, she was forced to defend her right to the county in several high-profile court cases. She was a major business entrepreneur. In this respect, she was unusual: married women were legally wards under their husband's guardianship and could thus not formally engage in business, but as her spouse signed a power of attorney enabling her to do so.
