= 2021 UCI Mountain Bike World Championships =

International sports competition

2021 World Championships
- Location: Val di Sole, Italy
- Dates: 25 to 29 August 2021

The 2021 UCI Mountain Bike World Championships were held from 25 to 29 August 2021 in Val di Sole, Italy.

== Medal summary ==
=== Medal table ===
* Host nation (Italy)

Rank	Nation	Gold	Silver	Bronze	Total
1	France	5	7	2	14
2	Switzerland	3	1	4	8
3	Czech Republic	2	0	0	2
4	Great Britain	1	2	0	3
5	Austria	1	1	1	3
5	United States	1	1	1	3
7	Canada	1	0	1	2
8	Bulgaria	1	0	0	1
8	Chile	1	0	0	1
8	South Africa	1	0	0	1
11	Italy*	0	1	1	2
12	Brazil	0	1	0	1
12	Colombia	0	1	0	1
12	Netherlands	0	1	0	1
12	Norway	0	1	0	1
16	Germany	0	0	3	3
17	Australia	0	0	1	1
17	Bolivia	0	0	1	1
17	Denmark	0	0	1	1
17	New Zealand	0	0	1	1
Totals (20 entries)		17	17	17	51

=== Men's events ===
Event	Gold		Silver		Bronze	
Cross-country Olympic	Nino Schurter (SUI)	1:22:31	Mathias Flückiger (SUI)	1:22:33	Victor Koretzky (FRA)	1:23:39
Cross-country short track	Christopher Blevins (USA)	19:30	Henrique Avancini (BRA)	19:32	Maximilian Brandl (GER)	19:32
Electric MTB Cross-country	Jérôme Gilloux (FRA)	51:44	Hugo Pigeon (FRA)	52:02	Christopher Blevins (USA)	52:55
Downhill	Greg Minnaar (RSA)	3:28.963	Benoît Coulanges (FRA)	3:29.190	Troy Brosnan (AUS)	3:29.404
Four-cross	Tomáš Slavík (CZE)		Adrien Loron (FRA)		Hannes Slavik (AUT)	

=== Women's events ===
Event	Gold		Silver		Bronze	
Cross-country Olympic	Evie Richards (GBR)	1:23:52	Anne Terpstra (NED)	1:24:55	Sina Frei (SUI)	1:25:00
Cross-country short track	Sina Frei (SUI)	20:11	Evie Richards (GBR)	20:11	Pauline Ferrand-Prévot (FRA)	20:12
Electric MTB Cross-country	Nicole Göldi (SUI)	49:24	Laura Charles (FRA)	49:37	Sofia Wiedenroth (GER)	50:07
Downhill	Myriam Nicole (FRA)	4:06.243	Marine Cabirou (FRA)	4:11.070	Camille Balanche (SUI)	4:12.342
Four-cross	Michaela Hájková (CZE)		Mathilde Bernard (FRA)		Anna Sara Rojas (BOL)	

=== Team events ===
Event	Gold		Silver		Bronze	
Cross-country Olympic	France; Mathis Azzaro (13:12); Adrien Boichis (13:13); Lena Gerault (15:09); Tatiana Tournut (16:05); Line Burquier (15:29); Jordan Sarrou (12:43)	1:25:51	United States; Christopher Blevins (12:39); Brayden Johnson (13:10); Savilia Blunk (15:28); Ruth Holcomb (17:28); Kate Courtney (15:37); Riley Amos (12:17)	1:26:39	Germany; Leon Reinhard Kaiser (13:26); Paul Schehl (13:12); Sina van Thiel (16:24); Nina Benz (15:14); Ronja Eibl (15:52); Luca Schwarzbauer (12:32)	1:26:40

=== Under-23 and Junior events ===
Event	Gold		Silver		Bronze	
Men's Under-23 Cross-country	Martín Vidaurre (CHI)	1:10:31	Juri Zanotti (ITA)	1:11:34	Joel Roth (SUI)	1:12:09
Men's Junior Cross-country	Adrien Boichis (FRA)	59:59	Camilo Gómez (COL)	1:01:12	Nils Aebersold (SUI)	1:01:20
Men's Junior Downhill	Jackson Goldstone (CAN)	3:37.097	Jordan Williams (GBR)	3:38.909	Lachlan Stevens-McNab (NZL)	3:40.657
Women's Under-23 Cross-country	Mona Mitterwallner (AUT)	1:06:57	Laura Stigger (AUT)	1:09:01	Caroline Bohé (DEN)	1:10:23
Women's Junior Cross-country	Line Burquier (FRA)	55:29	Olivia Onesti (FRA)	55:34	Sara Cortinovis (ITA)	55:35
Women's Junior Downhill	Izabela Yankova (BUL)	4:30.865	Kine Haugom (NOR)	4:41.709	Gracey Hemstreet (CAN)	4:44.110
