= Castiglione dei Pepoli =

Castiglione dei Pepoli Castión (Emilian)
- Comune
- Comune di Castiglione dei Pepoli
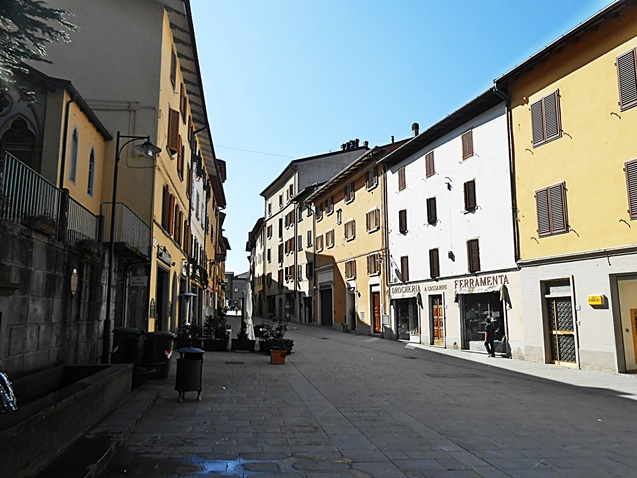

- Coat of arms

- Location within Italy Location within Emilia-Romagna
- Coordinates: 44°9′N 11°9′E
- Country: Italy
- Region: Emilia-Romagna
- Metropolitan city: Bologna (BO)
- Frazioni: Baragazza, Ca' di Landino, Creda, Lagaro, Rasora, Roncobilaccio, San Giacomo, Sparvo, Spianamento, Monte Baducco, Valli

Government
  - Mayor: Maurizio Fabbri

Area
  - Total: 65.76 km^{2} (25.39 sq mi)
- Elevation: 691 m (2,267 ft)

Population (30 June 2017)
  - Total: 5,505
  - Density: 83.71/km^{2} (216.8/sq mi)
- Time zone: UTC+1 (CET)
  - Summer (DST): UTC+2 (CEST)
- Postal code: 40035
- Dialing code: 0534
- Website: Official website

Castiglione dei Pepoli (High Mountain Bolognese: Castión) is a comune (municipality) in the Metropolitan City of Bologna, Emilia-Romagna, Italy, located about 40 kilometres (25 miles) southwest of Bologna.

It takes its name from the Pepoli noble family of Bologna.

Asteroid 400193 Castión was named after the city by its dialectal name. The official naming citation was published by the Minor Planet Center on 25 September 2018 (M.P.C. 111804).

== International relations ==
Castiglione dei Pepoli is twinned with:

- Nogent-sur-Marne, France
