= Léry, Quebec =

Léry
- City
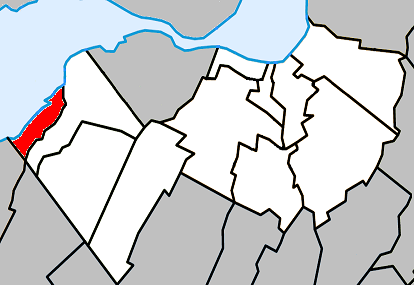
- Location within Roussillon RCM

- Location in southern Quebec
- Coordinates: 45.35°N 73.8°W
- Country: Canada
- Province: Quebec
- Region: Montérégie
- RCM: Roussillon
- Constituted: June 1, 1914

Government
  - Mayor: Kevin Boyle
  - Federal riding: Châteauguay—Les Jardins-de-Napierville
  - Prov. riding: Châteauguay

Area
  - Total: 10.20 km^{2} (3.94 sq mi)
  - Land: 10.57 km^{2} (4.08 sq mi)
- There is an apparent contradiction between two authoritative sources

Population (2011)
  - Total: 2,307
  - Density: 218.2/km^{2} (565/sq mi)
  - Pop 2006-2011: ▼3.3%
  - Dwellings: 1,037
- Time zone: UTC−5 (EST)
  - Summer (DST): UTC−4 (EDT)
- Postal code(s): J6N
- Area codes: 450 and 579
- Highways A-30: R-132
- Website: www.lery.ca

Léry (French pronunciation: [leʁi]) is a small town situated along the south shore of Lake Saint-Louis in Quebec, Canada. The population as of the Canada 2011 Census was 2,307. Located on Route 132 west of Châteauguay and east of Beauharnois in the administrative region of Montérégie, the town is home to the Bellevue Golf Club, with its two 18-hole courses.

== Demographics ==
Historical Census Data - Léry, Quebec
| Year | Pop. | ±% |
|---|---|---|
| 1991 | 2,429 | — |
| 1996 | 2,410 | −0.8% |
| 2001 | 2,378 | −1.3% |
| 2006 | 2,385 | +0.3% |
| 2011 | 2,307 | −3.3% |

In the 2021 Census of Population conducted by Statistics Canada, Léry had a population of 2,390 living in 989 of its 1,034 total private dwellings, a change of 3.1% from its 2016 population of 2,318. With a land area of 10.36 km^{2} (4.00 sq mi), it had a population density of 230.7/km^{2} (597.5/sq mi) in 2021.

Canada census – Léry community profile

| | 2021 | 2011 |
| Population | 2,390 (+3.1% from 2016) | 2,307 (-3.3% from 2006) |
| Land area | 10.36 km^{2} (4.00 sq mi) | 10.57 km^{2} (4.08 sq mi) |
| Population density | 230.7/km^{2} (598/sq mi) | 218.2/km^{2} (565/sq mi) |
| Median age | 46.0 (M: 46.0, F: 46.0) | 46.1 (M: 46.4, F: 45.7) |
| Private dwellings | 1,034 (total) 989 (occupied) | 1,037 (total) |
| Median household income | $95,000 | $61,412 |

References: 2021 2011

Canada Census Mother Tongue - Léry, Quebec
| Census | Total | French | | | English | | | French & English | | | Other | | |
| Year | Responses | Count | Trend | Pop % | Count | Trend | Pop % | Count | Trend | Pop % | Count | Trend | Pop % |
| 2011 | 2,290 | 1,910 | ▲2.7% | 83.41% | 270 | ▼29.9% | 11.79% | 30 | ▲100.0% | 1.31% | 80 | ▼36.0% | 3.49% |
| 2006 | 2,385 | 1,860 | ▼4.1% | 77.99% | 385 | ▲4.1% | 16.14% | 15 | ▲50.0% | 0.63% | 125 | ▲127.3% | 5.24% |
| 2001 | 2,375 | 1,940 | ▼6.7% | 81.68% | 370 | ▲45.1% | 15.58% | 10 | 0.0% | 0.42% | 55 | ▲22.2% | 2.32% |
| 1996 | 2,390 | 2,080 | n/a | 87.03% | 255 | n/a | 10.67% | 10 | n/a | 0.42% | 45 | n/a | 1.88% |

== See also ==
- List of anglophone communities in Quebec
- List of cities in Quebec
