= Annet-sur-Marne =

- Commune
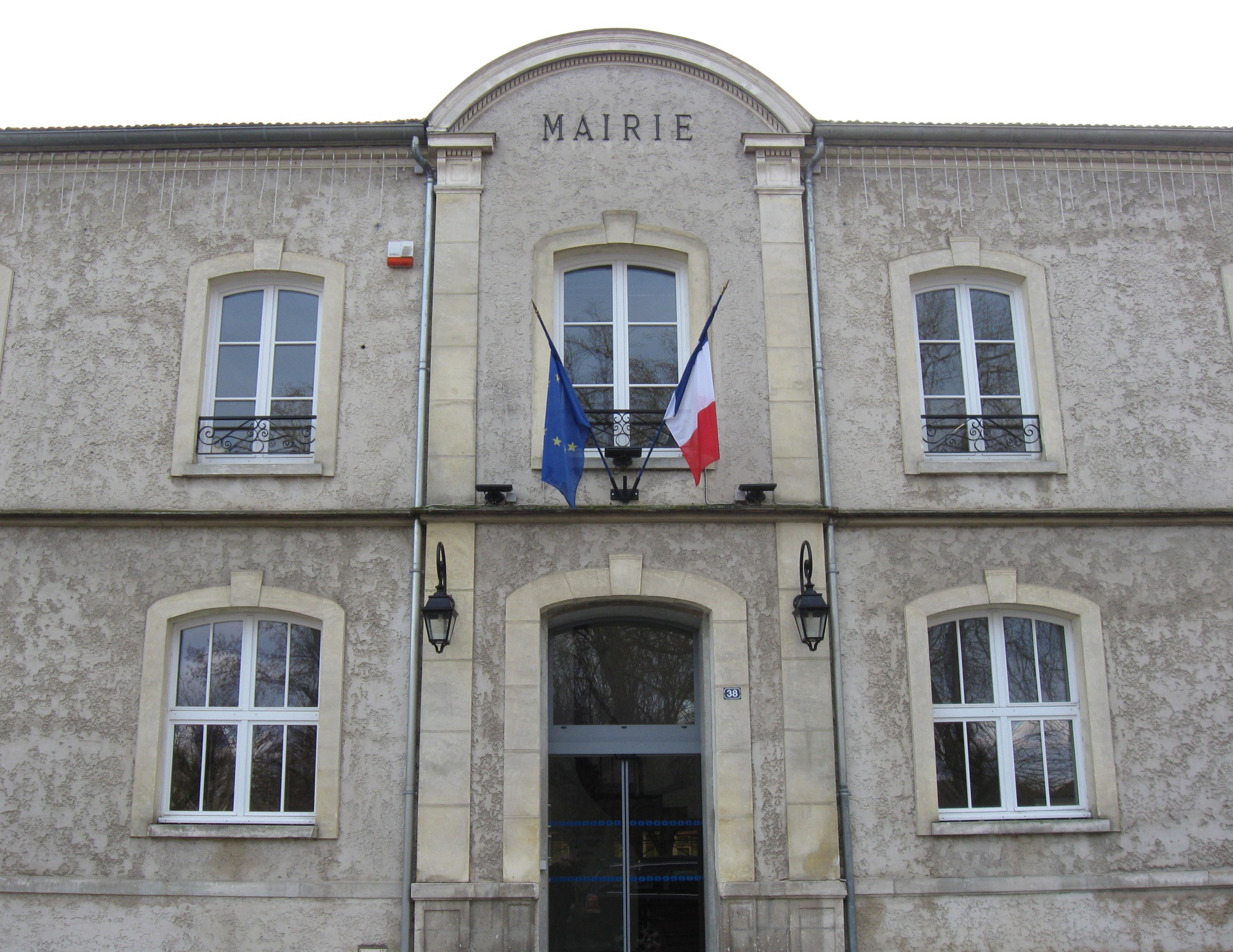
- The town hall in Annet-sur-Marne

- Coat of arms
- Location of Annet-sur-Marne
- Location within France Location within Île-de-France (region)
- Coordinates: 48°55′32″N 2°43′09″E
- Country: France
- Region: Île-de-France
- Department: Seine-et-Marne
- Arrondissement: Meaux
- Canton: Claye-Souilly
- Intercommunality: CC Plaines et Monts de France

Government
  - Mayor (2020–2026): Stéphanie Auzias
- Area^{1}: 13.19 km^{2} (5.09 sq mi)
- Highest elevation: 133 m (436 ft)
- Lowest elevation: 38 m (125 ft)
- Population (2023): 3,408
  - Density: 258.4/km^{2} (669.2/sq mi)
- Demonym: Annetois
- Time zone: UTC+01:00 (CET)
  - Summer (DST): UTC+02:00 (CEST)
- INSEE/Postal code: 77005 /77410
- ^{1} French Land Register data, which excludes lakes, ponds, glaciers > 1 km^{2} (0.386 sq mi or 247 acres) and river estuaries.

Annet-sur-Marne (French pronunciation: [anɛ syʁ maʁn]; lit. 'Annet-on-Marne') is a commune in the Seine-et-Marne department in the Île-de-France region in northern France.

== Population ==
Historical population
Year	Pop.	±% p.a.
1968	1,201	—
1975	1,715	+5.22%
1982	1,714	−0.01%
1990	2,128	+2.74%
1999	2,482	+1.72%
2007	3,240	+3.39%
2012	3,209	−0.19%
2017	3,278	+0.43%
2023	3,408	+0.65%
Source: INSEE

The inhabitants are called Annetois in French.

== See also ==
- Communes of the Seine-et-Marne department
