= Men's classification in the Cape Epic =

Yellow zebra jersey
- Sport: Mountain bike
- Competition: Cape Epic
- Awarded for: Men's Overall best time

History
- First award: 2004
- Editions: 16 (as of 2019)
- First winner: Mannie Heymans (NAM); Karl Platt (GER)
- Most wins: Christoph Sauser (CHE); Karl Platt (GER) 5 times
- Most recent: Nino Schurter (CHE) -3- Filippo Colombo (CHE)

The Men's classification is the most important men's classification, the one by which the winner of the men's Cape Epic is determined. Since 2004, the leader of the general classification wears the yellow zebra jersey. Record champions are Christoph Sauser and Karl Platt with each 5 titles.

== Winners ==
Year	Team 1st	Winners	Time	Team 2nd	Second place	Time	Team 3rd	Third place	Time
2004	Focus/Rocky Mountain	Mannie Heymans (NAM); Karl Platt (GER) -1-	31:02:55,0	GT Africa	Jacques Rossouw (ZAF); Shan Wilson (ZAF)	31:29:19,0 +26:24,0	Adidas/Fiat Rotwild	Andreas Strobel (GER); Silvio Wieltschnig (AUT)	31:23:04,0 +20:09
2005	Giant	Roel Paulissen (BEL) -1- Bart Brentjens (NLD)	31:20:02,0	Siemens Cannondale MTB Racing Team	Christoph Sauser (CHE); Fredrik Kessiakoff (SWE)	31:46:31,0 +26:29,0	Adidas/Fiat Rotwild/Scott	Kevin Evans (ZAF); Silvio Wieltschnig (AUT)	32:44:44,0 +1:24:42,0
2006	Specialized	Christoph Sauser (CHE) -1- Silvio Bundi (CHE)	34:41:41,0	Stevens Racing	Johannes Stickmüller (GER); Christian Heule (CHE)	35:10:49,0 +29:08,0	Rocky Mountain Business Object	Karl Patt (GER); Carsten Bresser (GER)	35:18:21,0 +36:40,0
2007	Team Bulls -1-	Karl Platt (GER) -2- Stefan Sahm (GER) -1-	33:08:00,7	Cannondale-Vredestein1	Roel Paulissen (BEL); Jakob Fuglsang (DNK)	33:11:24,0 +3:23,3	Dolphin Mountainbike Team	Bart Brentjens (NLD); Rudi Van Houts (NLD)	33:51:45,6 +43:44,9
2008	Cannondale Vredestein	Roel Paulissen (BEL) -2- Jakob Fuglsang (DNK)	36:01:44,7	Bulls	Karl Platt (GER); Stefan Sahm (GER)	36:10:48,7 +9:04,0	MTN Energade 1	David George (ZAF); Kevin Evans (ZAF)	36:18:33,5 +16:48,8
2009	Bulls -2-	Karl Platt (GER) -3- Stefan Sahm (GER) -2-	28:10:13,8	Trek-Brentjens	Bart Brentjens (NLD); Chris Jongewaard (AUS)	28:15:07,9 +4:54,1	Felt Factory 2	Emil Lindgren (SWE); Andreas Kugler (CHE)	28:28:42,6 +18:28,8
2010	Bulls 1 -3-	Karl Platt (GER) -4- Stefan Sahm (GER) -3-	29:47:46,0	Songo-Specialized by DCM	Christoph Sauser (CHE); Burry Stander (ZAF)	29:57:49,7 +10:03,7	MTN Qhubeka Topeak Ergon	Kevin Evans (ZAF); Alban Lakata (AUT)	30:12:30,0 +24:44,0
2011	36ONE-SONGO-SPECIALIZED -1-	Christoph Sauser (CHE) -2- Burry Stander (ZAF) -1-	28:44:44,0	Multivan Mérida Biking	Hannes Genze (GER); Jochen Kaess (GER)	28:51:52,8 +7:08,8	Bulls	Karl Platt (GER); Stefan Sahm (GER)	29:05:53,7 +21:09,7
2012	36ONE-SONGO-SPECIALIZED -2-	Christoph Sauser (CHE) -3- Burry Stander (ZAF) -2-	31:46:50,5	360Life	Kevin Evans (ZAF); David George (ZAF)	32:14:12,6 +27:22,1	Multivan Mérida Biking	Hannes Genze (GER); Andreas Kugler (CHE)	32:17:57,5 +31:07,0
2013	Burry Stander - SONGO	Christoph Sauser (CHE) -4- Jaroslav Kulhavý (CZE) -1-	29:40:44,9	Bulls	Karl Platt (GER); Urs Huber (CHE)	29:47:55,3 +7:10,4	Bulls 2	Thomas Dietsch (FRA); Tim Bohme (GER)	30:07:35,9 +26:51,0
2014	Topeak-Ergon Racing	Robert Mennen (GER); Kristian Hynek (CZE)	30:31:59,2	Meerendal Songo Specialized	Christoph Sauser (CHE); Frantisek Rabon (CZE)	30:42:22,4 +10:23,2	Bulls 2	Tim Bohme (GER); Simon Stiebjahn (GER)	30:45:25,2 +13:26,0
2015	Investec-Songo-Specialized	Christoph Sauser (CHE) -5- Jaroslav Kulhavý (CZE) -2-	31:00:57,7	Topeak Ergon	Kristian Hynek (CZE); Alban Lakata (AUT)	31:11:39,5 +10:41,8	Bulls	Karl Platt (GER); Urs Huber (CHE)	31:35:23,0 +34:25,3
2016	Bulls -4-	Karl Platt (GER) -5- Urs Huber (CHE)	28:13:28,4	Centurion Vaude by Meerendal 2	Nicola Rohrbach (CHE); Matthias Pfrommer (CHE)	28:26:36,7 +13:08,3	Trek-Selle San Marco A	Samuele Porro (ITA); Damiano Ferraro (ITA)	28:38:32,9 +25:04,5
2017	SCOTT-SRAM MTB Racing	Nino Schurter (CHE) -1- Matthias Stirnemann (CHE)	26:35:06,5	Investec-Songo-Specialized	Christoph Sauser (CHE); Jaroslav Kulhavý (CZE)	26:43:13,9 +8:07,4	Centurion Vaude 2	Nicola Rohrbach (CHE); Daniel Geismayr (AUT)	26:54:41,3 +19:34,8
2018	InvestecSongoSpecialized	Jaroslav Kulhavý (CZE) -3- Howard Grotts (USA)	25:29:48,9	Canyon Topeak	Alban Lakata (AUT); Kristian Hynek (CZE)	25:39:27,4 +9:38,5	Cannondale Factory Racing	Manuel Fumic (GER); Henrique Avancini (BRA)	25:43:01,8 +13:12,9
2019	SCOTT-SRAM MTB Racing	Nino Schurter (CHE) -2- Lars Forster (CHE)	26:09:45,5	Cannondale Factory Racing	Manuel Fumic (GER); Henrique Avancini (BRA)	26:17:22,4 +7:36,9	Trek-Selle San Marco	Damiano Ferraro (ITA); Samuele Porro (ITA)	26:26:22,8 +16:37,3

== Statistics ==
=== By rider ===
Rank	Rider	Gold	Silver	Bronze	Total
1	Christoph Sauser (CHE)	5	4	0	9
2	Karl Platt (GER)	5	2	2	9
3	Stefan Sahm (GER)	3	1	1	5
4	Jaroslav Kulhavý (CZE)	3	1	0	4
5	Burry Stander (ZAF)	2	1	0	3
5	Roel Paulissen (BEL)	2	1	0	3
7	Nino Schurter (CHE)	2	0	0	2
8	Kristian Hynek (CZE)	1	2	0	3
9	Bart Brentjens (NLD)	1	1	1	3
9	Urs Huber (CHE)	1	1	1	3
11	Jakob Fuglsang (DNK)	1	1	0	2
12	Howard Grotts (USA)	1	0	0	1
12	Lars Forster (CHE)	1	0	0	1
12	Mannie Heymans (NAM)	1	0	0	1
12	Matthias Stirnemann (CHE)	1	0	0	1
12	Robert Mennen (GER)	1	0	0	1
12	Silvio Bundi (CHE)	1	0	0	1
Totals (17 entries)		32	15	5	52

=== By duo ===
Rank	Duo	Gold	Silver	Bronze	Total
1	Karl Platt (GER) Stefan Sahm (GER)	3	1	1	5
2	Christoph Sauser (CHE) Jaroslav Kulhavý (CZE)	2	1	0	3
2	Christoph Sauser (CHE) Burry Stander (ZAF)	2	1	0	3
4	Karl Platt (GER) Urs Huber (CHE)	1	1	1	3
5	Roel Paulissen (BEL) Jakob Fuglsang (DNK)	1	1	0	2
6	Kristian Hynek (CZE) Alban Lakata (AUT)	0	2	0	2
7	Kevin Evans (ZAF) David George (ZAF)	0	1	1	2
7	Manuel Fumic (GER) Henrique Avancini (BRA)	0	1	1	2
9	Damiano Ferraro (ITA) Samuele Porro (ITA)	0	0	2	2
Totals (9 entries)		9	9	6	24

=== By nationality ===
Rank	Nation	Gold	Silver	Bronze	Total
1	Switzerland (CHE)	11	8	4	23
2	Germany (GER)	9	7	11	27
3	Czech Republic (CZE)	4	4	0	8
4	South Africa (ZAF)	2	5	4	11
5	Belgium (BEL)	2	1	0	3
6	Netherlands (NLD)	1	1	2	4
7	Denmark (DNK)	1	1	0	2
8	Namibia (NAM)	1	0	0	1
8	United States (USA)	1	0	0	1
10	Austria (AUT)	0	2	4	6
11	Brazil (BRA)	0	1	1	2
11	Sweden (SWE)	0	1	1	2
13	Australia (AUS)	0	1	0	1
14	Italy (ITA)	0	0	4	4
15	France (FRA)	0	0	1	1
Totals (15 entries)		32	32	32	96
