= Pražské schody 2010 =

Pražské schody 2010 represented sixteen years since Pražské schody (Prague Stairs) cycling race was first held in Pražský hrad, in the capital city of the Czech Republic. It took place on June 9, 2010.

== Elite - Men ==
pos	bib	name	team	finish time	time lost
1	3	Jaroslav Kulhavý (CZE)	Rubena Specialized	1:02:35.6	
2	2	Florian Vogel (SUI)	Scott-Swisspower MTB Racing	1:02:41.5	-5.9
3	27	Matouš Ulman (CZE)	S&H Superior MTB team	1:02:44.5	-8.9
4	16	Tomáš Vokrouhlík (CZE)	Factor bike team	1:02:51.8	-16.2
5	4	Roel Paulissen (BEL)	Cannondale Factory Team	1:04:08.2	-1:32.6
6	21	Jiří Friedl (CZE)	Merida Biking	1:04:12.3	-1:36.7
7	5	Cédric Ravanel (FRA)	Team Lapierre International	1:04:18.9	-1:43.3
8	17	Ivan Rybařík (CZE)	MERIDA BIKING TEAM	1:05:30.6	-2:55.0
9	26	Filip Eberl (CZE)	Scott Cycling Team	1:05:34.8	-2:59.2
10	56	Jiří Hudeček (CZE)	dimp GIANT team	1:05:44.7	-3:09.1
11	46	Marek Rauchfuss (CZE)	Scott Cycling Team	1:03:38.7	-1 lap
12	20	Stanislav Hejduk (CZE)	Factor bike team	52:23.2	-4 laps
13	11	Jan Hruška (CZE)	Volvo Auto Hase	46:23.9	-6 laps
14	49	Michal Kanera (CZE)	Axid Doldy	46:23.9	-6 laps
15	1	Christoph Sauser (SUI)	Specialized Factory Racing	40:21.4	-7 laps
16	22	Ondřej Fojtík (CZE)	Volvo auto Hase MTB	43:23.4	-7 laps
17	7	Pavel Boudný (CZE)	Česká Spořitelna Specialized Team	43:23.6	-7 laps
18	8	Tomáš Paprstka (CZE)	Scott Cycling Team	40:07.4	-8 laps
19	18	Jiří Novák (CZE)	Česká Spořitelna Specialized Team	40:10.2	-8 laps
20	13	Václav Ježek (CZE)	Alpine Pro-Author	35:04.5	-9 laps
21	23	Lukáš Sáblík (CZE)	Scott Cycling Team	34:04.9	-10 laps
22	10	Martin Jakš (CZE)	Volvo auto Hase MTB	27:22.0	-12 laps
23	30	Michal Plesník (CZE)	Alpine Pro-Author	27:22.8	-12 laps
24	33	Jan Fojtík (CZE)	Volvo auto Hase MTB	24:03.7	-13 laps
25	12	Martin Bína (CZE)	Cyklo Team Budvar Tábor	24:08.6	-13 laps
26	25	Martin Mareš (CZE)	PSK WHIRLPOOL - AUTHOR	24:14.4	-13 laps
27	43	Petr Tatíček (CZE)	KELLYS BIKE RANCH TEAM	24:21.0	-13 laps
28	14	Petr Dlask (CZE)	Fidea Team	20:51.8	-14 laps
29	37	Josef Rajchart (CZE)	Česká Spořitelna Specialized Team	20:56.6	-14 laps
30	44	Michal Kohoutek (CZE)	KELLYS BIKE RANCH TEAM	22:40.9	-14 laps
31	48	David Klap (CZE)	Team Kofola	23:58.9	-14 laps
32	29	Jan Strož (CZE)	Alpine Pro - Author	17:32.9	-15 laps
33	53	Daniel Dvořáček (CZE)	Cafe Nanini	17:56.3	-15 laps
34	31	Marek Nebesář (CZE)	Big Shock Team Life	18:05.7	-15 laps
35	54	Ondřej Kobliha (CZE)	ČS Specialized Team	18:30.5	-15 laps
36	45	Lukáš Míkovec (CZE)	Bike Centrum Radotín	18:35.6	-15 laps
37	39	Matěj Širc (CZE)	KC KOOPERATIVA SG JABLONEC .N	18:35.6	-15 laps
38	51	Petr Novotný (CZE)	Kona Cycling Point	19:32.8	-15 laps
39	32	Jakub Truksa (CZE)	Atombike Trek Racing Team	19:42.0	-15 laps
40	40	Jakub Hink (CZE)	KC KOOPERATIVA SG JABLONEC .N	19:44.9	-15 laps
41	42	Michal Bubílek (CZE)	KELLYS BIKE RANCH TEAM	13:34.4	-16 laps
42	38	Dominik Buksa (CZE)	Česká Spořitelna Specialized Team	14:32.0	-16 laps
43	34	Michal Vlček (CZE)	KC KOOPERATIVA SG JABLONEC .N	14:46.6	-16 laps
44	19	Petr Benčík (CZE)	PSK WHIRLPOOL-AUTHOR	11:11.1	-17 laps
45	36	Michal Malík (CZE)	KC KOOPERATIVA SG JABLONEC .N	11:29.2	-17 laps
46	6	Ben Henderson (AUS)	Mongoose team	6:15.2	-18 laps
47	35	Jiří Kalivoda (CZE)	KC KOOPERATIVA SG JABLONEC .N	7:38.7	-18 laps
	9	Lukáš Bauer (CZE)	Volvo auto Hase MTB	DNF0	
	15	Jan Škarnitzl (CZE)	dimp GIANT team	DNS	
	24	Kristian Hynek (CZE)	S&H Superior MTB team	DNS	
	28	Václav Hlaváč (CZE)	AC Sparta Praha	DNS	
	41	Radek Polnický (CZE)	dimp GIANT team	DNS	
	47	Zbyněk Kugler (CZE)	Team Kofola	DNS	
	50	Tomáš Dvořák (CZE)	Richter + Frenzel	DNS	
	55	Radovan Kyjovský (CZE)	Team Ghost	DNS	

== Elite - Women ==
pos	bib	name	team	finish time	time lost
1	52	Cécile Rhode-Ravanel (FRA)	Team Lapierre International	1:04:18.7	-5 laps

== See also ==
Pražské schody - main page
