= Pražské schody 2008 =

Place: Pražský hrad, Prague

Date: 25.06.2008

- the race was cut because of bad weather conditions (torrential rain)

== Elite - Men ==
pos	bib	name	team	finish time
1	3	Roel Paulissen (BEL)	Cannondale-Vredestein	46:27,3
2	6	Jaroslav Kulhavý (CZE)	Michelin Specialized MTB Team	46:28,7
3	18	Jan Škarnitzl (CZE)	DIMP - Giant Team	46:28,9
4	17	Tomáš Vokrouhlík (CZE)	Factor Bike Team	46:29,1
5	10	Václav Ježek (CZE)	Spinning MB Alpine Pro	46:37,4
6	5	Adam Craig (USA)	Giant Mautain Bike Team	46:47,3
7	8	Pavel Boudný (CZE)	DEKHOME-Cannondale	46:57,2
8	1	Fredrik Kessiakoff (SWE)	Cannondale-Vredestein	47:06,1
9	12	Milan Spěšný (CZE)	Merida Biking Team	47:31,1
10	26	Jiří Novák (CZE)	DEKHOME-Cannondale	47:39,9
11	4	Cédric Ravanel (FRA)	Lapierre International Team	47:51,9
12	35	Lukáš Sáblík (CZE)	Scott Scania Team Kolín	48:04,0
13	21	Stanislav Hejduk (CZE)	Factor Bike Team	48:09,5
14	34	Matouš Ulman (CZE)	Scott Hagget MTB Team	48:19,6
15	7	Pavel Zerzáň (CZE)	Česká Spořitelna MTB	48:35,4
16	23	Jiří Hudeček (CZE)	DEKHOME-Cannondale	49:31,9
17	25	Martin Zlámalík (CZE)	Sportful.Cenytisku.cz	49:41,5
18	15	Tomáš Trunschka (CZE)	Česká Spořitelna MTB	49:55,4
19	52	Peter Sagan (SVK)	SVK	50:13,1
20	20	Václav Hlaváč (CZE)	Scott Scania Team Kolín	1 lap
21	24	Michal Bubílek (CZE)	Bikeranch Team	1 lap
22	32	Jan Fojtík (CZE)	Česká Spořitelna MTB	1 lap
23	40	Petr Vachek (CZE)	Poštovní spořitelna- Marin MTB	1 lap
24	2	Florian Vogel (SUI)	Swisspower MTB Team	2 laps
25	11	Filip Eberl (CZE)	Scott Scania Team Kolín	2 laps
26	31	Zbyněk Kugler (CZE)	Cyklotrenink.cz	2 laps
27	44	Matěj Brož (CZE)	DEKHOME-Cannondale	2 laps
28	53	Ivan Jeníček (CZE)	MTBC Manitou I-Bike Chrudim	2 laps
29	30	Ondřej Fojtík (CZE)	Toyota Dolák	3 laps
30	39	Michal Plesník (CZE)	Scott Hagget MTB Team	3 laps
31	29	Jakub Truksa (CZE)	Trek Bike Team U Tyrše	3 laps
32	28	Ondřej Hakl (CZE)	Toyota Dolák	4 laps
33	51	Ondřej Vater (CZE)	TJ Cykloprag	4 laps
34	16	Ivan Rybařík (CZE)	Sportful.Cenytisku.cz	5 laps
35	54	Ladislav Fabišovský (CZE)	Koruna Pralines	5 laps
36	48	Jiří Andera (CZE)	TJ Cykloprag	5 laps
37	46	Jan Černý (CZE)	MTB Team Příchovice	6 laps
38	22	Jan Chrobák (CZE)	Exe Jeans Team	6 laps
39	37	Václav Jelínek (CZE)	Exe Jeans Team	6 laps
40	43	David Jaroš (CZE)		6 laps
41	33	Roman Káles (CZE)	Bikeranch Team	7 laps
42	47	Marek Nebesář (CZE)	KC Kooperativa SG Jablonec	9 laps
43	9	Jan Hruška (CZE)	Cyklotrenink.cz	9 laps
44	49	Michal Malík (CZE)	KC Kooperativa SG Jablonec	9 laps
45	50	Jan Stroz (CZE)	KC Kooperativa SG Jablonec	9 laps
46	42	Ota Zima (CZE)	Bike Centrum Radotín	9 laps
47	41	Jan Hejna (CZE)	Sfinx Racing Team	10 laps
48	55	Jan Šťastný (CZE)	Cyklotrenink.com	10 laps
49	19	Kamil Ausbuher (CZE)	Exe Jeans Team	11 laps
50	27	Martin Bína (CZE)	Factor Bike Team	11 laps
	14	Radomír Šimůnek (CZE)		DNS
	36	Martin Těhan (CZE)		DNS
	38	Jiří Svěrák (CZE)		DNS
	45	Jan Václavík (CZE)		DNS

== See also ==
Pražské schody - main page
