= Pražské schody 2009 =

Place: Pražský hrad, Prague

Date: 03.06.2009

== Elite - Men ==
pos	bib	name	team	finish time	time lost
1	4	Zdeněk Štybar (CZE)	Fidea Cycling Team	59:35.0	
2	5	Christoph Soukup (AUT)	Merida Biking Team	59:45.4	-10.4
3	10	Jiří Friedl (CZE)	Merida Biking Team	1:00:23.9	-48.9
4	11	Václav Ježek (CZE)	Alpine Pro - Author	1:00:52.4	-1:17.4
5	12	Pavel Boudný (CZE)	Odlo Specialized	1:00:59.2	-1:24.2
6	1	Christoph Sauser (SUI)	Specialized Factory Team	1:01:04.9	-1:29.9
7	30	Jiří Novák (CZE)	Odlo Specialized	1:01:35.1	-2:00.1
8	20	Ondřej Fojtík (CZE)	Volvo auto Hase MTB	1:02:08.3	-2:33.3
9	32	Matej Nepustil (CZE)	Česká Spořitelna MTB team	1:02:32.8	-2:57.8
10	18	Stanislav Hejduk (CZE)	Factor Bike Team	1:02:40.4	-3:05.4
11	8	Ivan Seledkov (RUS)	Dynamo Merida	59:36.7	-1 laps
12	25	Matouš Ulman (CZE)	Scott Hagget MTB Team	53:10.4	-3 laps
13	17	Tomáš Vokrouhlík (CZE)	Factor Bike Team	53:10.7	-3 laps
14	15	Jan Hruška (CZE)	Cyklotrenink.cz	49:58.9	-4 laps
15	48	Tomáš Pešek (CZE)	Scott Scania Kolín Team	50:19.3	-4 laps
16	46	Jakub Magnusek (CZE)	Česká Spořitelna MTB team	47:18.2	-5 laps
17	42	Marek Rauchfuss (CZE)	CK MTB Hlinsko	47:18.9	-5 laps
18	7	Denis Vorontsov (RUS)	Russia Merida	47:31.1	-5 laps
19	24	Martin Zlámalík (CZE)	Volvo auto Hase MTB	43:24.4	-6 laps
20	28	Ondřej Hakl (CZE)	Volvo auto Hase MTB	44:13.0	-6 laps
21	44	Petr Vachek (CZE)	Subway Unibon Marin Team	44:14.1	-6 laps
22	23	Filip Eberl (CZE)	Scott Scania Kolín Team	44:23.0	-6 laps
23	21	Lukáš Sáblík (CZE)	Scott Scania Kolín Team	44:29.3	-6 laps
24	34	Václav Halaváč (CZE)	Halfords-Apache-Bike	44:30.3	-6 laps
25	40	Michal Plesník (CZE)	Alpine Pro - Author	44:42.9	-6 laps
26	16	Ivan Rybařík (CZE)	Volvo auto Hase MTB	47:34.3	-6 laps
27	3	Ben Henderson (AUS)	Mongoose Team	41:17.2	-7 laps
28	22	Kristián Hynek (CZE)	Scott Hagget MTB Team	34:06.6	-9 laps
29	29	Michal Bubílek (CZE)	Merida-Bikeranch Team	34:09.3	-9 laps
30	49	Petr Tatíček (CZE)	Merida-Bikeranch Team	34:22.5	-9 laps
31	39	Jan Nesvadba (CZE)	KC Kooperativa SG Jablonec n.N	37:05.2	-9 laps
32	47	Josef Kamler (CZE)	Česká Spořitelna MTB team	30:40.2	-10 laps
33	2	Cédric Ravanel (FRA)	Lapierre International Team	31:01.4	-10 laps
34	27	Jiří Hudeček (CZE)	Scott Hagget MTB Team	31:01.9	-10 laps
35	19	Tomáš Trunschka (CZE)	Česká Spořitelna MTB team	31:08.3	-10 laps
36	26	Pavel Zerzáň (CZE)	Česká Spořitelna MTB team	31:45.5	-10 laps
37	33	Dominik Buksa (CZE)	ODLO - SPECIALIZED	29:04.0	-11 laps
38	31	Marek Nebesář (CZE)	KC Kooperativa SG Jablonec n.N	29:34.0	-11 laps
39	50	Michal Šimerle (CZE)	KC Kooperativa SG Jablonec n.N	29:34.3	-11 laps
40	45	Ondřej Kobliha (CZE)	4 EVER Cyklo Bulis team	25:08.3	-12 laps
41	6	Jaroslav Kulhavý (CZE)	Rubena Specialized	19:14.1	-13 laps
42	38	Michal Vlček (CZE)	KC Kooperativa SG Jablonec n.N	21:51.9	-13 laps
43	53	Ondřej Zelený (CZE)	Rubena Specialized Cycling Team	21:54.4	-13 laps
44	43	Jakub Truksa (CZE)	Atombike Trek Team	18:56.1	-14 laps
45	35	Ondřej Semerád (CZE)	S KPrima Polička	19:42.9	-14 laps
46	51	Miroslav Rybáček (CZE)	Survival-Specialized Team	16:18.3	-15 laps
47	9	Milan Spěšný (CZE)	Česká Spořitelna MTB team	06:00.4	-17 laps
48	37	Milan Špolc (CZE)	Survival-Specialized Team	07:24.8	-17 laps
49	52	Ota Zima (CZE)	Survival Specialized MTB Team	7.4	-19 laps
	41	Ondřej Cink (CZE)	Merida Biking	DNS	
	13	Pavel Pryadein (RUS)	Karo Film	DNS	
	14	Jan Škarnitzl (CZE)	DIMP - Giant Team	DNS	
	36	Jan Fojtík (CZE)	Volvo auto Hase MTB	DNS	

== See also ==
Pražské schody - main page
