= Pražské schody =

Annual Cycling race in Czechia

Pražské schody (Prague Stairs) is a specific cycling race held every year since 1994 in capital city of Czech Republic, Prague. The race specificity is the fact that cyclists riding down stairs (190 stairs) in Prague Castle and then climb back of cobblestones to the top. They do this for 1 hour + last circle.

Many top cyclists took part in this popular race Miguel Martinez, Julien Absalon, Daniele Pontoni, Thomas Frischknecht, Jaroslav Kulhavý etc.

== Results ==
year	winner	results
1994	Daniele Pontoni (ITA)	here
1995	Radovan Fořt (CZE)	here
1996	Mike Kluge (GER)	here
1997	Jan Kotal (CZE)	here
1998	Radim Kořínek (CZE)	here
1999	Radim Kořínek (CZE)	here
2000	Miguel Martinez (FRA)	here
2001	Miguel Martinez (FRA)	here
2002	Dario Acquaroli (ITA)	here
2003	Stanislav Hejduk (CZE)	here
2004	Miguel Martinez (FRA)	here
2005	José Antonio Hermida (ESP)	here
2006	Fredrik Kessiakoff (SWE)	here
2007	Fredrik Kessiakoff (SWE)	here
2008	Roel Paulissen (BEL)	here
2009	Zdeněk Štybar (CZE)	here
2010	Jaroslav Kulhavý (CZE)	here
2011	Burry Stander (RSA)	here
2012	José Antonio Hermida (ESP)	here
2013	Jan Škarnitzl (CZE)	here
2014	Fabian Giger (SUI)	here
