= Swiss Epic =

Mountain bike stage race

Race details
- Date: August–September
- Region: Canton of Grisons, Switzerland
- Discipline: Mountain bike racing
- Competition: Epic Series
- Type: Stage race
- Organiser: Swiss Epic AG
- Web site: www.swiss-epic.com

History
- First edition: 2014
- Editions: 6
- First winner: See Winners
- Most wins: Dani Schnider (CHE); Oliver Imfeld (CHE); 5 times (Masters)
- Most recent: See Winners

The Swiss Epic is an annual mountain bike stage race held in the Canton of Grisons, Switzerland. It has been accredited as hors catégorie (beyond categorisation) by the Union Cycliste Internationale. It is part of the global Epic Series and was once inspired by the pinnacle event of it, the Cape Epic.

Alongside the Cape Epic and The Pioneer in New Zealand, the Swiss Epic is considered a Legend Race. Legend races are the top category of the global Epic Series, and any rider resolute enough to complete three Epic Series races, including the pinnacle event, the Absa Cape Epic, gets awarded with Epic Legend status. This status is immortalised in the form of an Epic Legend medal.

== History ==
The Swiss Epic was founded in 2014. Joko Vogel, Dany Gehrig, and Thomas Frischknecht had the idea of a multi-day stage race in Switzerland whereby the Cape Epic in South Africa has been used a model.

In 2014, two months after the first edition, the Union Cycliste Internationale (UCI) granted the hors catégorie.

In 2018, the parliament of the Canton of Grisons signed a five-year contract with the Swiss Epic that they spend 300.000 CHF each year. Therefore, the race was relocated from the Canton of Valais to the Canton of Grisons. The Swiss Epic is considered the European equivalent of the Cape Epic.

== Editions ==
| Year | Date | Start | Finish | Altitude (m) | Distance (km) | Teams |
|---|---|---|---|---|---|---|
| 2014 | 15. – 20. September | Verbier | Zermatt | 15.000 | 400 | 101 |
| 2015 | 14. – 19. September | Verbier | Zermatt | 15.000 | 400 | 133 |
| 2016 | 12. – 17. September | Zermatt | Verbier | 12.500 | 360 | 119 |
| 2017 | 11. – 16. September | Grächen | Zermatt | 12.000 | 350 | 82 |
| 2018 | 11. – 15. September | Bettmeralp | Zermatt | 12.550 | 331 | 168 |
| 2019 | 20. – 24. August | Davos | Davos | 12.000 | 350 | 287 |
| 2020 | 18. – 22. August | Laax | Davos | 12.250 | 320 | 207 |
| 2021 | 17. – 21. August | St. Moritz | Davos | 12.000 | 350 | 400 |

== Winners ==
=== Men's winners ===
| Year | Team | Winners | Time | Teams |
|---|---|---|---|---|
| 2014 | Stöckli-BiXS -1- | Lukas Buchli (CHE) -1- Mathias Flückiger (CHE) -1- | 19:05:45,9 | 90 |
| 2015 | BiXS STÖCKLI -2- | Mathias Flückiger (CHE) -2- Lukas Buchli (CHE) -2- | 20:11:13,7 | 76 |
| 2016 | BMC | Lukas Flückiger (CHE); Reto Indergand (CHE) | 16:39:54,0 | 52 |
| 2017 | CENTURION VAUDE | Daniel Geismayr (AUT); Jochen Käss (GER) | 17:58:13,0 | 38 |
| 2018 | SCOTT-SRAM MTB RACING | Matthias Stirnemann (CHE); Andri Frischknecht (CHE) | 16:56:25,8 | 50 |
| 2019 | Trek Selle San Marco A | Michele Casagrande (ITA); Fabian Rabensteiner (CHE) | 16:00:06,0 | 86 |
| 2020 | SCOTT-SRAM | Nino Schurter (CHE); Lars Forster (CHE) | 15:13:44 | 66 |

=== Women's winners ===
| Year | Team | Winners | Time | Teams |
|---|---|---|---|---|
| 2014 | Specialized II | Annika Langvad (DNK); Ariane Kleinhans (CHE) | 24:26:14,5 | 8 |
| 2015 | Topeak Ergon Racing Team | Adelheid Morath (GER) -1- Sally Bigham (GBR) | 25:34:57,7 | 5 |
| 2016 | Stöckli Pro | Jolanda Neff (CHE); Alessandra Keller (CHE) | 20:32:15,0 | 8 |
| 2017 | Team Meerendal CBC | Esther Süss (CHE); Jennie Stenerhag (SWE) | 22:25:49,0 | 8 |
| 2018 | Team Canada | Haley Smith (CAN); Catharine Pendrel (CAN) | 21:03:47,8 | 8 |
| 2019 | KS TREK – Sportograf | Adelheid Morath (GER) -2- Bettina Janas (GER) | 20:36:27,5 | 10 |
| 2020 | Specialized – Racing | Annika Langvad (DNK) -2- Haley Batten (USA) | 19:08:09 | 12 |

=== Masters winners ===
| Year | Team | Winners | Time | Teams |
|---|---|---|---|---|
| 2014 | SCOTT ROAD | Pierre Bourquenoud (CHE); Serge Robadey (CHE) | 24:40:46,7 | 77 |
| 2015 | DANi SCHNIDER RADSPORT -1- | Dani Schnider (CHE) -1- Oliver Imfeld (CHE) -1- | 20:14:51,0 | 32 |
| 2016 | DANi -2- | Dani Schnider (CHE) -2- Oliver Imfeld (CHE) -2- | 20:32:15,0 | 8 |
| 2017 | DANi SCHNIDER RADSPORT -3- | Dani Schnider (CHE) -3- Oliver Imfeld (CHE) -3- | 20:45:44,0 | 29 |
| 2018 | DANi SCHNIDER RADSPORT -4- | Dani Schnider (CHE) -4- Oliver Imfeld (CHE) -4- | 20:12:51,5 | 50 |
| 2019 | DANi SCHNIDER RADSPORT -5- | Oliver Imfeld (CHE) -5- Dani Schnider (CHE) -5- | 18:51:52,6 | 89 |
| 2020 | Auer Velos/Stoll Bikes | Norbert Amgarten (CHE); Thomas Girardi (CHE) | 18:29:23 | 52 |

=== Grand Masters winners ===
| Year | Team | Winners | Time | Teams |
|---|---|---|---|---|
| 2018 | BiXS / Bikeholiday.ch -1- | Bärti Bucher (CHE) -1- Hansjürg Gerber (CHE) -1- | 20:51:23,7 | 15 |
| 2019 | BiXS Bikeholiday -2- | Bärti Bucher (CHE) -2- Hansjürg Gerber (CHE) -2- | 20:00:03,4 | 39 |
| 2020 | CST PostNL Bafang MTB Racing Team | Bart Brentjens (NLD) -2- Peter Vesel (SVN) | 19:21:24 | 30 |

=== Mixed winners ===
| Year | Team | Winners | Time | Teams |
|---|---|---|---|---|
| 2014 | BiXS – Wheeler | Bärti Bucher (CHE); Milena Landtwing (CHE) | 24:19:15,8 | 26 |
| 2015 | Giant Team Obwalden | Hans Flück (CHE); Anita Bucher (CHE) | 28:52:44,2 | 20 |
| 2016 | R'ADYS SCOTT | Adrian Ruhstaller (CHE); Cornelia Hug (CHE) | 21:47:04,0 | 15 |
| 2017 | CrazyVeloShop SCOTT / TG-Hütten | Bendicht Küpfer (CHE); Viviane Spielmann (CHE) | 25:55:11,0 | 7 |
| 2018 | Fitness Maréchal | Florence Darbellay (CHE); Jérémy Huguenin (CHE) | 22:06:37,1 | 15 |
| 2019 | Team VeloCity | Anders Seim (NOR); Synne Steinsland (NOR) | 21:30:39,6 | 29 |
| 2020 | Velosolutions #pumpforpeace | Cherie Redecker (ZAF); Tumelo Makae (LSO) | 20:27:11 | 20 |
