= Cycling at the 2004 Summer Olympics – Men's cross-country =

Cycling at the Olympics

Men's cross-country at the Games of the XXVIII Olympiad
- Date: 28 August
- Competitors: 49 from 32 nations
- Winning time: 2:15:02

Medalists
1st place, gold medalist(s)		Julien Absalon; France
2nd place, silver medalist(s)		José Antonio Hermida; Spain
3rd place, bronze medalist(s)		Bart Brentjens; Netherlands

The men's cross-country event in cycling at the 2004 Summer Olympics consisted of 1 start loop and 7 full loops around a circuit - totalling 43.3 km. The race started at 11:00 on 28 August 2004.

== Medalists ==
Gold	Silver	Bronze
Julien Absalon (FRA)	José Antonio Hermida (ESP)	Bart Brentjens (NED)

== Results ==
Final results
Rank	Name	Country	Time
1st place, gold medalist(s)	Julien Absalon	France	2:15:02
2nd place, silver medalist(s)	José Antonio Hermida	Spain	2:16:02
3rd place, bronze medalist(s)	Bart Brentjens	Netherlands	2:17:05
4	Roel Paulissen	Belgium	2:18:10
5	Liam Killeen	Great Britain	2:18:32
6	Ralph Näf	Switzerland	2:19:15
7	Thomas Frischknecht	Switzerland	2:19:39
8	Manuel Fumic	Germany	2:20:29
9	Seamus McGrath	Canada	2:20:33
10	Marco Bui	Italy	2:20:45
11	Jean-Christophe Péraud	France	2:20:59
12	Fredrik Kessiakoff	Sweden	2:21:23
13	Bas Peters	Netherlands	2:21:44
14	Marek Galiński	Poland	2:22:14
15	Christoph Soukup	Austria	2:22:50
16	Iván Álvarez	Spain	2:23:08
17	Oli Beckingsale	Great Britain	2:23:15
18	Peter Riis Andersen	Denmark	2:24:03
19	Todd Wells	United States	2:24:37
20	Carsten Bresser	Germany	2:25:09
21	Jeremy Horgan-Kobelski	United States	2:25:28
22	Radim Korinek	Czech Republic	2:25:28
23	Sid Taberlay	Australia	2:26:16
24	Marcin Karczynski	Poland	2:26:41
25	Thijs Al	Netherlands	2:27:13
26	José Adrián Bonilla	Costa Rica	2:27:13
27	Yuri Trofimov	Russia	2:27:46
28	Kashi Leuchs	New Zealand	2:28:20
29	Mannie Heymans	Namibia	2:28:28
30	Robin Seymour	Ireland	2:28:32
31	Joshua Fleming	Australia	2:29:54
32	Michael Weiss	Austria	2:30:14
33	Edvandro Cruz	Brazil	2:30:35
34	Ľuboš Kondis	Slovakia	2:31:15
35	Yader Zoli	Italy	2:31:39
36	Sergiy Rysenko	Ukraine	2:33:10
37	Ovidiu Oprea	Romania	-1 lap
38	Kenji Takeya	Japan	-1 lap
39	Christian Poulsen	Denmark	-1 lap
40	Cristóbal Silva	Chile	-1 lap
41	Sigvard Kukk	Estonia	-2 laps
42	Zhu Yongbiao	China	-2 laps
43	Zsolt Vinczeffy	Hungary	-2 laps
44	Carlos Gennero	Argentina	-3 laps
45	Manolis Kotoulas	Greece	-3 laps
—	Miguel Martinez	France	DNF
—	Jaroslav Kulhavý	Czech Republic	DNF
—	Lado Fumic	Germany	DNF
—	Christoph Sauser	Switzerland	DNF
—	Ryder Hesjedal	Canada	DNF
