= Epic Series =

Race details
- Date: March–December
- Region: Australia; New Zealand; South Africa; Switzerland
- Discipline: Mountain bike racing
- Type: Stage race
- Organiser: Various
- Web site: www.cape-epic.com/%20Official%20Site

History
- First edition: 2018

The Epic Series is a series of mountain bike stage races held around the world. The most prestigious race is the Cape Epic. The other five functions as qualifier for it.

== History ==
In 2018, the parliament of the Canton of Grisons signed a four-year contract with the Swiss Epic that they spend 300.000 CHF each year. They will become a good pendant to the Cape Epic.

== Races ==
Name	Est.	Month	Region	Country	Stages	Legend	Qualifier	Triple Crown
Cape Epic	2004	March - April	Western Cape	South Africa	8	Yes	No	No
Port to Port	2014	late May	Newcastle	Australia	4	No	Yes	Yes
Reef to Reef	2018	mid August	North Queensland	Australia	4	No	Yes	Yes
Swiss Epic	2014	late August - early September	Grisons	Switzerland	5	Yes	Yes	No
Cape to Cape	2008	mid October	Western Australia	Australia	4	No	Yes	Yes
The Pioneer	2016	late November - early December	Southern Alps	New Zealand	6	Yes	Yes	No

== Qualifications ==
=== Performance Allocation ===
The winners of the men's, women's, mixed, Masters and Grand Masters receive a spot at the following Cape Epic. The second placed teams of the Swiss Epic receive also a spot.

=== Draw Allocation ===
One spot per category will be drawn at the final days. Only finisher of the event and no winner's are able to win the spot.

== Epic Series Legend Race ==
The three big races Cape Epic, Swiss Epic and The Pioneer are so called Legend Races.

=== Epic Legend Medal ===
Bikers who finished all three Legend races receive the Epic Legend Medal.

Accomplish at	Name	Country	Cape	Swiss	Pioneer	Duration	In one Year
2018 Swiss Epic	Minter Barnard	Australia	2011	2018	2016	7 years, 5 months and 12 days	No
2018 Swiss Epic	Haley van Leeuwen	New Zealand	2018	2018	2017	1 year, 7 months and 4 days	2018
2018 The Pioneer	Timothy Hammond	South Africa	2016	2018	2018	2 years, 8 months and 10 days	2018
2018 The Pioneer	Peter Felber	Switzerland	2018	2016	2018	2 years, 2 months and 13 days	No
2018 The Pioneer	David Wright	South Africa	2013	2018	2018	5 years, 8 months and 6 days	No
2018 The Pioneer	Enrico Theuns	Netherlands	2012	2014	2018	6 years, 7 months and 29 days	No
2018 The Pioneer	Chak Shing Cheng	Hong Kong	2014	2018	2018	4 years, 8 months and 10 days	2018
2018 The Pioneer	Alan Gordon	South Africa	2016	2018	2018	2 years, 8 months and 10 days	No
2019 Cape Epic	Alexander Donaldson	New Zealand	2019	2018	2018	6 months and 9 days	No
2019 Cape Epic	Kylie Burrows	New Zealand	2019	2016	2016	2 years, 6 months and 7 days	No
