= Yader Zoli =

Italian cyclist

Personal information
- Born: 1 October 1975 (age 51) Faenza, Italy
- Height: 1.70 m (5 ft 7 in)
- Weight: 64 kg (141 lb)

Cycling career
- Sport: Cycling
- Current team: Torpado Factory Team
- Discipline: Mountain biking
- Role: Rider
- Rider type: Cross-country

Professional teams
- 2000: Diamontback
- 2006–2007: KTM International
- 2008: Giant Italia
- 2009–: Torpado Factory Team

Yader Zoli (born 1 October 1975 in Faenza) is an Italian professional mountain biker. He has claimed three Italian national championship titles in men's mountain biking, and later represented his nation Italy in two editions of the Olympic Games (2004 and 2008). Zoli currently trains and races for the 2013 season on the Torpado Surfing Shop pro cycling team, along with Belgian rider and four-time Olympian Roel Paulissen.

Zoli made his official debut at the 2004 Summer Olympics in Athens, where he scored a thirty-fifth place in the men's cross-country race with a time of 2:31:39, finishing farther off the podium by seventeen minutes.

At the 2008 Summer Olympics in Beijing, Zoli qualified again for his second Italian squad, along with his teammate Marco Aurelio Fontana, in the men's cross-country race by receiving one of the nation's two available berths from the Italian Cycling Federation (Italian: Federazione Ciclistica Italiana, FCI) and the Union Cycliste Internationale (UCI), based on his best performance at the World Cup series, World and European Championships, and Mountain Biking World Series. Zoli could not upgrade a much stellar ride from Athens, as he decided to pull himself off from a 4.8-km cross-country race course with only a single lap left to complete and a thirtieth-place effort because of bike problems.

== Career achievements ==
2002
2nd Italian MTB Championships (Cross-country), Trentino (ITA)
2004
35th Olympic Games (Cross-country), Athens (2004)
2005
(gold) Stage 7, UCI World Cup (Marathon), Sankt Wendel (GER)
2006
1st Italian MTB Championships (Cross-country), Italy
(silver) UCI World Championships (Cross-country, Team relay), Rotorua (NZL)
(silver) UCI World Cup (Marathon), Villabassa ITA)
2007
1st Italian MTB Championships (Cross-country), Treviso (ITA)
1st Stage 3, Afxentia Stage Race, Cyprus
2nd Overall, Race Under The Sun, Yermasoyia (CYP)
3rd Stage 1, Afxentia Stage Race, Cyprus
2008
1st Italian MTB Championships (Cross-country), Grotte di Castro (ITA)
30th Olympic Games (Cross-country), Beijing (CHN)
