= Sáblík =

Sáblík (feminine: Sáblíková) in a Czech surname. Notable people with the surname include:

- Lukáš Sáblík (born 1976), Czech ice hockey player
- Martina Sáblíková (born 1987), Czech speed skater
- Milan Sáblík (born 1991), Czech speed skater
