= Kenji Takeya =

Japanese cyclist

Personal information
- Born: 7 November 1969 (age 56) Tokyo, Japan

Cycling career
- Sport: Cycling

Kenji Takeya (born 7 November 1969) is a Japanese cyclist. He competed in the men's cross-country mountain biking event at the 2004 Summer Olympics.
