= Zsolt Vinczeffy =

Hungarian cyclist

Personal information
- Born: 23 September 1974 (age 52) Budapest, Hungary

Cycling career
- Sport: Cycling

Zsolt Vinczeffy (born 23 September 1974) is a Hungarian cyclist. He competed in the men's cross-country mountain biking event at the 2004 Summer Olympics.
