= Manolis Kotoulas =

Greek cyclist (born 1978)

Personal information
- Born: 3 April 1978 (age 48)

Cycling career
- Sport: Cycling

Manolis Kotoulas (born 3 April 1978) is a Greek cyclist. He competed in the men's cross-country mountain biking event at the 2004 Summer Olympics.
