= Karl Platt =

German cyclist (born 1978)

Personal information
- Full name: Karl Platt
- Born: March 14, 1978 (age 48) Novosibirsk

Cycling career
- Sport: Cycling
- Discipline: Mountain bike
- Role: Rider
- Rider type: Cross-country, marathon

Major wins
- Absa Cape Epic Champion: (2004, 2007, 2009, 2010, 2016)
Medal record
Representing Germany
Men's mountain bike racing

Karl Platt (born March 14, 1978, in Novosibirsk) is a German mountain biker.

== Life and career ==
Platt grew up in Siberia until the age of ten, where his parents were banished during Stalinism. After the travel ban was relaxed under Mikhail Gorbachev, the family emigrated to Germany and lives since then in Osthofen.

In 1991 Platt bought a mountain bike and joined the LLG Wonnegau. As his first success he became German junior downhill-champion in 1996 and after his move to cross country cycling he won the Lake Garda Marathon in 2001.

His greatest achievements followed at the Cape Epic: He has won the South African mountain bike stage race five times since 2004. Except Platt only the Swiss Christoph Sauser also won the Cape Epic five times.

In addition, Platt 2008 and 2015 become German champion in the mountain bike marathon.
