= Ovidiu Oprea =

Romanian cyclist

Personal information
- Born: 10 September 1976 (age 50) Târnăveni, Romania

Cycling career
- Sport: Cycling

Ovidiu Oprea (born 10 September 1976) is a Romanian cyclist. He competed in the men's cross-country mountain biking event at the 2004 Summer Olympics.
