= Andri Frischknecht =

Swiss cross-country mountain biker (born 1994)

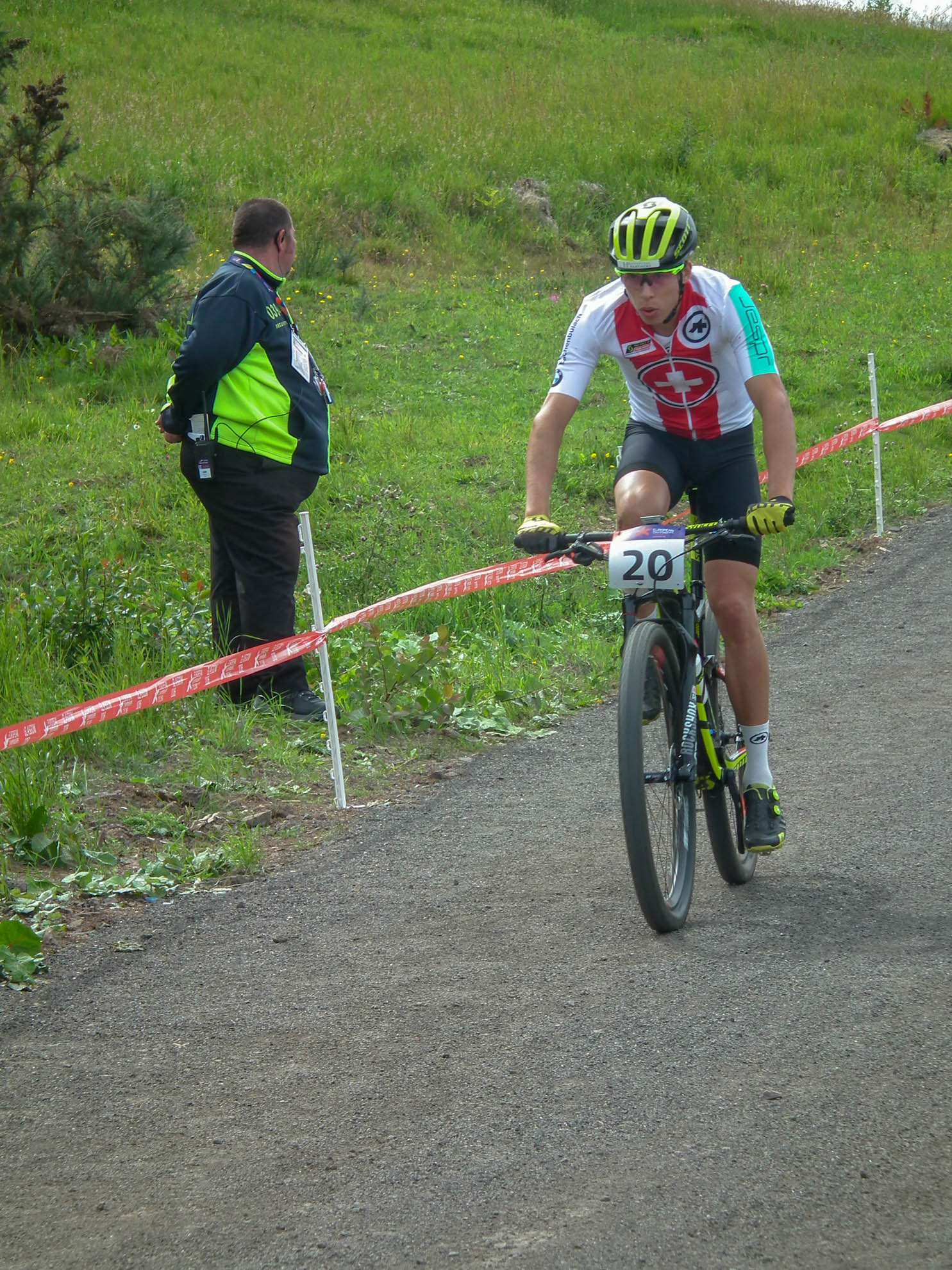
- Andri Frischknecht in 2018

Personal information
- Born: 7 July 1994 (age 32)
- Height: 1.79 m (5 ft 10 in)
- Weight: 73 kg (161 lb)

Cycling career
- Sport: Cycling
- Disciplines: Cross-country; Cyclo-cross
- Role: Rider
Medal record
World Championships
Silver medal – second place	2014 Hafjell/Lillehammer	Team relay

Andri Frischknecht (born 7 July 1994) is a Swiss cross-country mountain biker. He is the son of Thomas Frischknecht, and the grandson of Peter Frischknecht, who were also professional cyclists.

== Career ==
On 31 October 2025 he fell in the Gravel Burn Race (during a neutralized phase) in South Africa and was severely hurt. A fractured part of clavicula punctured the lung.

== Major results ==
=== Mountain bike ===
2014
2nd Team relay, UCI World Championships
2015
1st Cross-country, National Under-23 Championships
2nd Team relay, UEC European Championships
2017
1st Team relay, UEC European Championships
2018
1st Overall Swiss Epic (with Matthias Stirnemann)
2021
Swiss Bike Cup

2nd Gränichen
2nd Schaan
3rd Savognin
3rd Lugano

2022
Swiss Bike Cup

1st Rickenbach
2nd Gränichen

National Championships

3rd Cross-country
3rd Short track

Ökk Bike Revolution

3rd Huttwil

=== Cyclo-cross ===
2011–2012
2nd National Junior Championships
2014–2015
2nd National Under-23 Championships
2017–2018
3rd Flückiger Cross Madiswil
3rd Dagmersellen
2018–2019
2nd National Championships
2019–2020
3rd GP Luzern/Pfaffnau
2021–2022
3rd Meilen
2022–2023
3rd Meilen
2023–2024
3rd National Championships
