= Ľuboš Kondis =

Slovak cyclist

Personal information
- Born: 29 June 1976 (age 50) Humenné, Czechoslovakia

Cycling career
- Sport: Cycling

Ľuboš Kondis (born 29 June 1976) is a Slovak cyclist. He competed in the men's cross-country mountain biking event at the 2004 Summer Olympics.
