= Carlos Gennero =

Argentine cyclist

Personal information
- Full name: Carlos Franco Gennero Caceres
- Born: 7 April 1979 (age 47) San Miguel de Tucumán, Argentina

Cycling career
- Sport: Cycling

Carlos Franco Gennero Caceres (Note: In this Spanish name, the first or paternal surname is Gennero and the second or maternal family name is Caceres.) (born 7 April 1979) is an Argentine cyclist. He competed in the men's cross-country mountain biking event at the 2004 Summer Olympics.
