= Christian Poulsen (cyclist) =

Danish cyclist

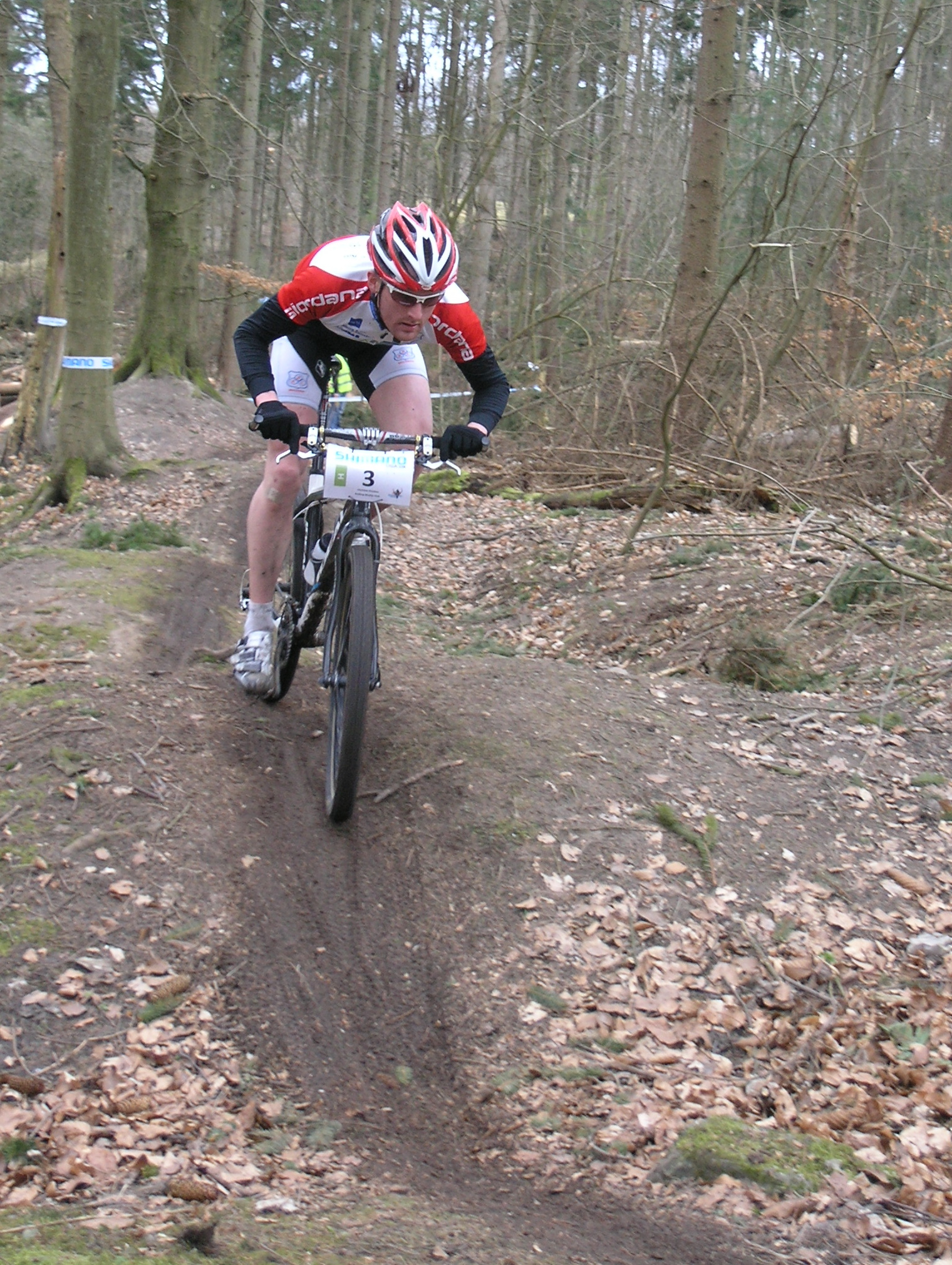

Personal information
- Born: 18 September 1979 (age 47) Kolding, Denmark

Cycling career
- Sport: Cycling

Christian Poulsen (born 18 September 1979) is a Danish cyclist. He competed in the men's cross-country mountain biking event at the 2004 Summer Olympics.
