= Joshua Fleming =

Australian cyclist

Personal information
- Born: 14 November 1975 (age 50) Caringbah, Australia

Cycling career
- Sport: Cycling

Joshua Fleming (born 14 November 1975) is an Australian cyclist. He competed in the men's cross-country mountain biking event at the 2004 Summer Olympics.
