= Sigvard Kukk =

Estonian cyclist

Sigvard Kukk (born September 16, 1972 in Tallinn) is an Estonian cycling athlete. He placed 41st in mountain biking at the 2004 Olympic Games.

== Achievements ==
2001

- 1. Mulgi Cycling Marathon winner
- 2. Otepää Cycling Marathon winner

2002

- 3. Elva Cycling Marathon winner
- 4. Otepää Cycling Marathon winner
- 5. Tartu Cycling Marathon winner

2004

- 6. Elva Cycling Marathon winner

2007

- 7. Tallinn Cycling Marathon winner
- 8. Jõulumäe Cycling Marathon winner
- 9. Elion Estonian Cup overall 2nd place
