= Matthias Stirnemann =

Swiss mountain biker

Personal information
- Born: 8 November 1991 (age 34)

Cycling career
- Sport: Cycling
- Discipline: Cross-country
- Role: Rider

Professional teams
- 2011–2012: Thömus Racing Team
- 2013: BMC Mountainbike Racing Team

Matthias Stirnemann (born 8 November 1991) is a Swiss cross-country mountain biker.

He finished 6th overall in the 2016 UCI Mountain Bike World Cup.

== Major results ==
2017
1st Overall Cape Epic (with Nino Schurter)
2018
1st Overall Swiss Epic (with Andri Frischknecht)
