= Bart Brentjens =

Dutch cyclist (born 1968)

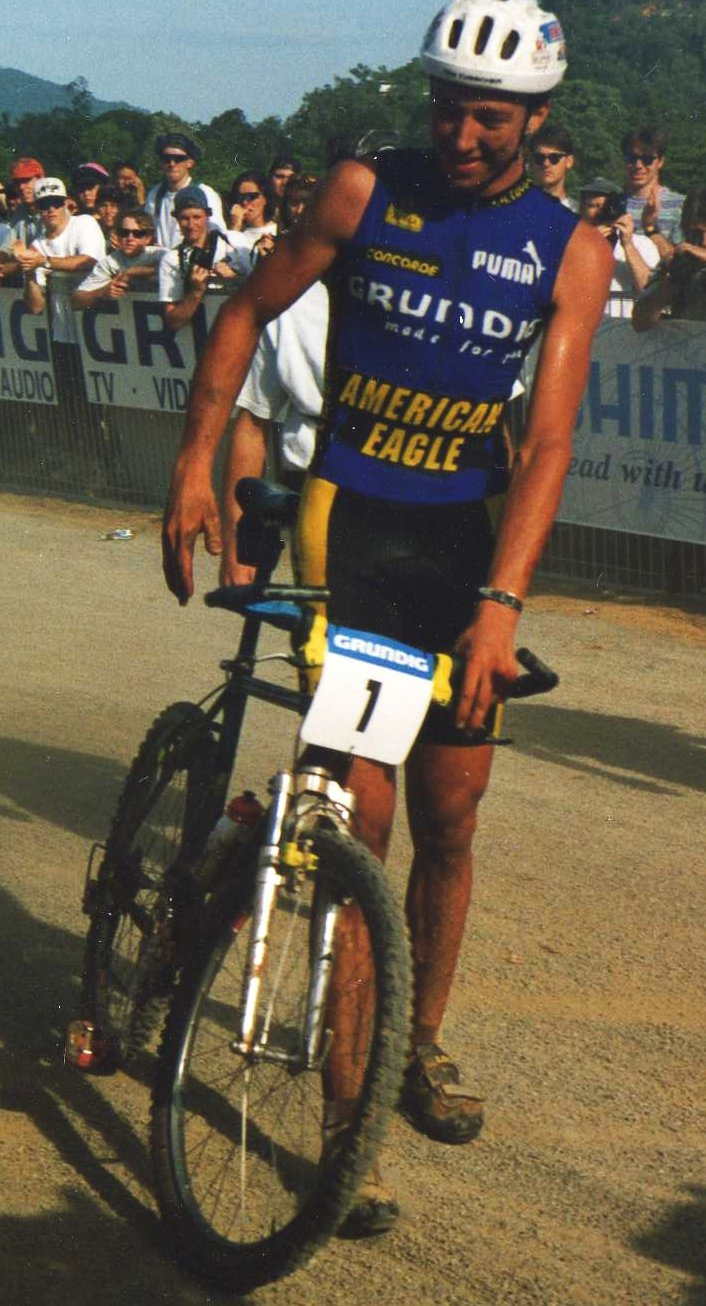

Personal information
- Full name: Bart Jan-Baptist Marie Brentjens
- Nickname: Bartman
- Born: 10 October 1968 (age 58) Haelen, the Netherlands

Cycling career
- Sport: Cycling
- Discipline: MTB
- Role: Rider

Professional teams
- 1991–1996: American Eagle
- 1997–1999: Mountain-Dew Specialized
- 2000–2006: Giant
- 2007–2008: Dolphin-Trek
- 2009–2012: Milka-Superior
- 2013–present: Superior MTB Team

Major wins
- Mountain bike Olympic Games XC (1996) World XC Championships (1995) National XC Championships (1995, 1996, 2000–2007) XC World Cup (1994) 4 individual wins Cape Epic (2005)
Medal record
Representing the Netherlands
Men's mountain bike racing
Olympic Games
Gold medal – first place	1996 Atlanta	Mountain bike
Bronze medal – third place	2004 Athens	Mountain bike
World Championships
Gold medal – first place	1995 Kirchzarten	Cross Country
Silver medal – second place	2003 Lugano	Marathon
Silver medal – second place	2005 Lillehammer	Marathon
Bronze medal – third place	1994 Vailo	Cross Country
Bronze medal – third place	2000 Sierra Nevada	Cross Country
Bronze medal – third place	2004 Bad Goisern	Marathon

Bart Jan-Baptist Marie Brentjens (born 10 October 1968 in Haelen) is a Dutch racing cyclist in mountain biking.

Brentjens won a gold medal for mountain biking in the 1996 Summer Olympics, the first to recognize cross-country mountain biking as an event. He followed this with bronze in the 2004 Summer Olympics. Previously he won gold at the 1995 UCI Mountain Bike & Trials World Championships. In 2007 he became 10th time Dutch National champion

Brentjens competed in Men's category of the Absa Cape Epic in 2005, winning 1st place overall with team mate Roel Paulissen. In 2009 he won 2nd place overall, this time competing alongside Chris Jongewaard. Brentjens then began competing in the Master's category. He won the category in both 2012 with Jan Weevers and in 2014 with Abraao Azevedo. He has completed the marathon stage race ten times to date.

Brentjens, along with Rob Warner, was also a co-commentator for Red Bull TV's official coverage of the UCI Mountain Bike World Cup (XCO). With GCN/Eurosport taking over coverage of UCI Mountain Bike coverage in 2023 Bart is now co-commentating with Kate Mason.

Since November 2016 Bart Brentjens is product manager at American Eagle mountain bikes.

== Major results ==
=== 1996 Summer Olympics ===
==== Men's cross-country ====
- Gold Medal (Cross Country 1996 Atlanta, USA)

UCI Mountain Bike & Trials World Championships

- Gold Medal (Cross Country: 1995)
- Silver Medal (Marathon: 2003, 2005)
- Bronze Medal (Cross Country: 1994, 2000; Marathon: 2004)

UCI Mountain Bike World Cup

- 1st Overall (1994)

Absa Cape Epic

- 1st Overall (2005)
- 3rd Overall (2007)
- 2nd Overall (2009)
- 1st Masters category (2012)
- 2nd Masters category (2013)
- 1st Masters category (2014)
- 1st Masters category (2015)

== See also ==
- List of Dutch Olympic cyclists
