= Cape Epic =

Annual mountain bike race in South Africa

Absa Cape Epic

Race details
- Date: March–April
- Region: Western Cape, South Africa
- Discipline: Mountain bike racing
- Type: Stage race
- Organiser: Cape Epic Pty Ltd
- Race director: 2004–2018 Kati Csak (RSA); 2019–2025 Karen Clements (RSA); 2025–current Shannon Valstar (RSA)
- Web site: www.cape-epic.com

History
- First edition: 2004
- Editions: 20
- First winner: Karl Platt (GER); Mannie Heymans (NAM)
- Most wins: Annika Langvad (DEN)
- Most recent: Nino Schurter (SWI); Filippo Colombo (SWI)

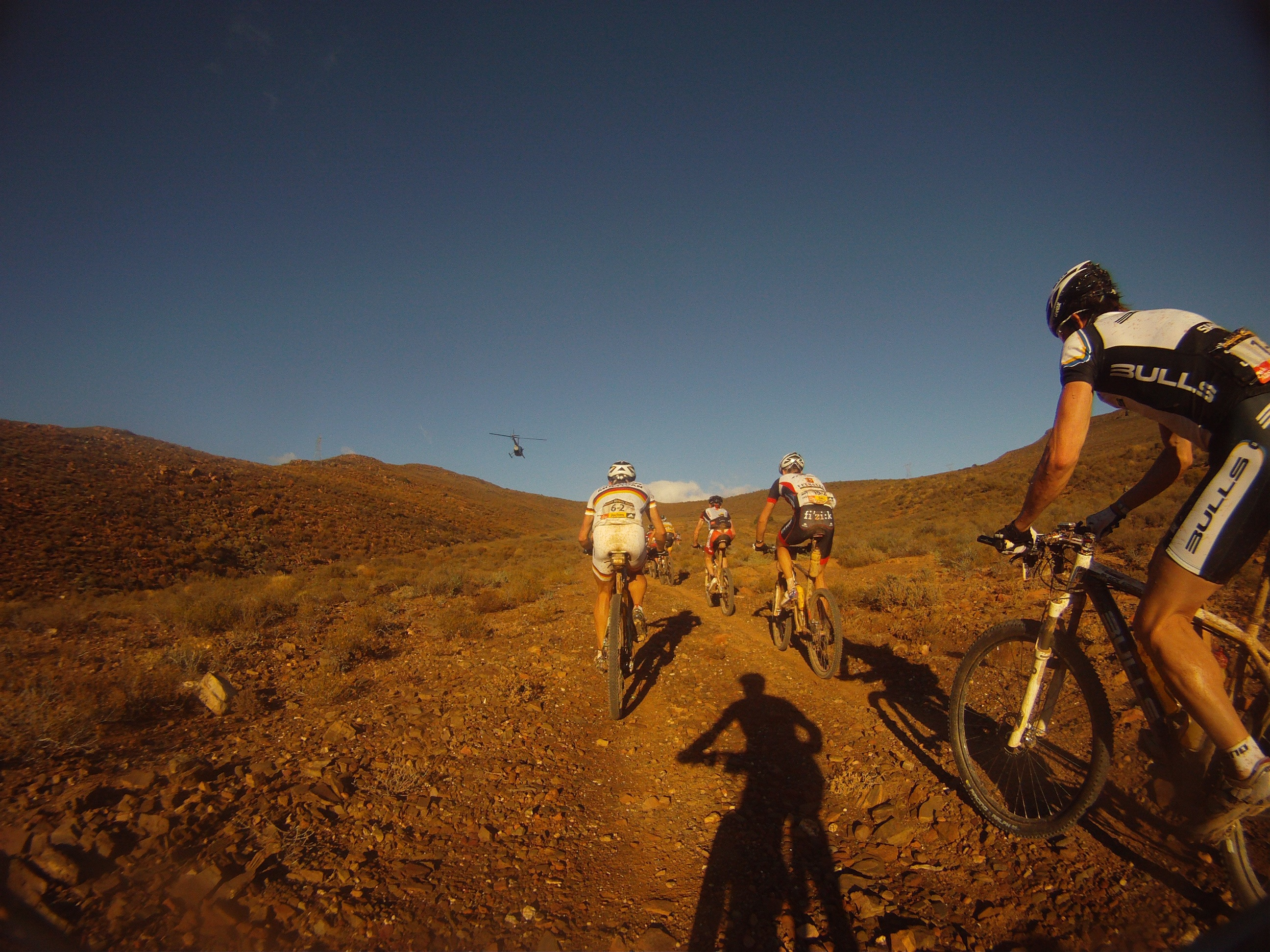
Riders during the 2009 Absa Cape Epic

The Absa Cape Epic or the Cape Epic is an annual mountain bike stage race held in the Western Cape, South Africa. First staged in 2004, it has been accredited as hors catégorie (beyond categorization) by the Union Cycliste Internationale.

The eight day race consists of a prologue and seven stages, and typically covers more than 680 km (420 mi) with some 16,900 m (55,400 ft) of climbing. Mountain bikers from around the world encompassing over 700 teams compete in teams of two. To qualify for a finish, teams have to stay together for the duration of the race. The Professional race is by invitation only, with the amateurs able to who enter a lottery in order to gain a slot. The times taken to finish each stage are combined to determine the overall winning team in each category at the end of the race. The course changes every year, but the race has always taken place in the Western Cape.

The race was acquired by The Ironman Group in August 2016. Advance Publications bought The Ironman Group in March 2020.

== Origins ==
Kevin Vermaak founded the Absa Cape Epic in 2004 at a time when there were no similar events in South Africa and mountain biking was in its infancy in the country. Today, the Absa Cape Epic is routinely referred to as "the Tour de France of mountain biking". The growth of the Absa Cape Epic has been paralleled by an explosion in the popularity of mountain biking in South Africa, and there are now more than 50 stage races. Vermaak, a Capetonian and UCT electrical engineering graduate, worked in IT in London in the early 2000s and, as a passionate mountain biker, took part in events across the world, including two mountain bike crossings of the Himalayas. He conceived the Absa Cape Epic while taking part in the La Ruta de los Conquistadores in Costa Rica in November, 2002. By February 2003 he was back in South Africa after eight years in London to establish the Cape Epic. Vermaak rode the Absa Cape Epic for the first time in 2016, and again in 2019.

== Route ==
The route starts and finishes in the Western Cape, South Africa. It is redesigned every year. The race lasts eight days and typically covers around 700 kilometers (430 miles). The shortest Absa Cape Epic took place in 2016 at 647 kilometers (402 miles), the longest route being in 2008 at 966 kilometers (600 miles). The route originally was a point-to-point race, beginning in Knysna and ending in the winelands of the Western Cape. This format changed in 2009, when riders spent multiple days in each stage location to ensure the route could fully explore the best mountain biking that the region had to offer.

== Race concept ==
Two person team
All riders must enter as a two-person team. Initially the team concept was developed because stage racing often takes riders through some very remote areas, and having partners who are bound by the race rules to look after each other serves a safety function. Riders in a team must remain within 2 minutes of each other at all times during the race or face a one-hour penalty. This is enforced by means of timing mats places through the stage. After a third offence, the team is disqualified. Teams are expected to reach the finish line by the specified maximum stage time, team dynamics therefore are a major part of the race.

Categories and leader jerseys
All riders aim to win stages, but mostly they want to win in their category. There are six categories: Elite (19+ years), Open (19 - 39 yrs), Mixed (19+ years), Master (40 - 49 years), Grand Master (50 - 59 years) and Great Grand Master (60+ years). The colours denoting the category leaders are: Yellow - Elite Men; Orange - Elite Women, Green - Mixed (1 woman and 1 man), Blue - Masters, Purple - Grand Masters and Grey - Great Grand Masters. The category leaders competition is decided by totaling the time each team takes on the daily stages. The team with the lowest overall time at the end of each stage receives ceremonial leaders' jerseys and the right to start the next stage of the race in those jerseys.

There are also two special jerseys: Absa African for leading all-african team, and the Exxaro jersey for the leading development team.

Blue numbers boards
Any rider who does not complete a stage within the maximum stage time for the first time will be classified as a blue board rider. Blue board riders will be entitled to continue the race (they may start the following stage), but will not be classified as official race finishers. Should any blue board rider fail for the second time to finish a stage within the maximum stage time or fail to start a stage, he or she will not be allowed to continue the race.

Leopard Jersey
Elite licensed riders who lose their partners will be allowed to continue riding but without influencing the outcome of the race. They are required to ride in the Leopard Jersey. Riders in this jersey may not interfere with any team still currently in the race. Any rider or team accepting mechanical or any other assistance from the outcast rider will be penalised. This will give the rider the opportunity to finish the race, be it unofficially, but still be part of the experience.

Internal technical and tactical support
It is allowed - any rider, including riders from the same sponsor (but not in the same 2-rider team) can provide technical assistance and equipment from his own bicycle to support another rider. Teams can also form alliances with other riders and teams, even if they are not of the same sponsor.

Pro-Am aspect of the race
Amateurs use the same chute, ride the same course and stay in the same race village as the UCI registered riders, which include world and national champions and Olympic medalists.

== History ==
=== Timeline from 2002 ===
Date	Description
2002	Kevin Vermaak participated in the 10th La Ruta de los Conquistadores in Costa Rica and was inspired to start something similar in the Cape.
2003	The Cape Epic name and logo are finalised in London + Munich: The knobbly tyres of the cyclist show that it is an off-road mountain bike race. The zebra stripes represented untamed Africa. The colours of the South Africa flag denote that it will be a truly South African race.
2003	The first marketing opportunity for the Cape Epic was a roaring success. The promotional stand at the Pick n Pay Cape Argus Cycle Tour Expo in Cape Town attracted more than 1000 inquiries.
2003	More than eighty VIP's, sports journalists and guests attend the official launch party of the Cape Epic at the Cullinan Hotel, Cape Town.
2003	South African regional entries for the inaugural race sell out in three days.
2003	The first crew workshop was held, along with distribution of the first official Cape Epic merchandise to 27 attendees - 12 of whom have worked at every single race since 2004. It was also the first time that black caps were produced for Cape Epic, and the few proud owners of these first pieces of official merchandise refer to this workshop as the 'black-cap workshop'.
2004	2004 Inaugural Cape Epic: 28 February to 6 March. 788 km & 17 380m climbing, from Knysna to Spier. 550 riders, 21% international and 20 countries represented. Winners: Karl Platt & Mannie Heymans.
2004	The 350 South African regional team entries for Cape Epic 2005 sell out in less than five hours.
2004	The international block of entries sells out for the first time.
2004	To accommodate the growing full-time staff of the Cape Epic, occupation of offices at 155 Loop Street in Cape Town were taken. The staff of 2 in 2004 has grown to 27 full-time staff that work exclusively for the race throughout the year.
2005	2005 Cape Epic: 2 to 9 April. 898 km & 16 020m climbing, from Knysna to Spier. 840 riders, 25% international and 29 countries represented. Winners: Roel Paulissen & Bart Brentjens.
2005	The Vigne à Vigne was launched. A mountain bike race held at the Grand Finale venue the morning of the Cape Epic finish, it is designed to allow riders to finish in time to see the winning Cape Epic riders cross the finish line.
2005	The Cape Epic is awarded UCI (Union Cycliste Internationale) status, the first ever team mountain bike stage race, and at the time the only mountain bike race in Africa to appear on the UCI calendar.
2005	The Cape Epic surpasses 2500 hours of global TV hours to become the most televised mountain bike race of all time.
2006	Absa, Africa's leading bank, announces title sponsorship – it's the Absa Cape Epic presented by Adidas.
2006	2006 Absa Cape Epic: 22 to 29 April. 940 km & 16 605m climbing, from Knysna to Spier. 1040 riders, 31% international and 35 countries represented. Winners: Christoph Sauser & Silvio Bundi.
2006	Introduction of Amabubesi club – the Cape Epic finishers club
2006	Lourensford is announced as the new finish venue after three successful finishes at Spier Wine Estate.
2007	2007 Absa Cape Epic: 24 to 31 March. 886 km & 15 045m climbing, from Knysna to Lourensford. 1200 riders, 29% international and 45 countries represented. Winners: Karl Platt & Stefan Sahm.
2007	A daily 24-minute TV highlights package is distributed globally – a world first for any mountain bike stage race.
2007	Personalised nutrition services introduced. Riders provide three Absa Cape Epic personalised water bottles each night with their own personal nutrition/recovery drink already mixed in it. The importance and appeal of chilled nutrition and recovery drinks on a 40-degree day ensures that this service sells out each year.
2007	Absa African Jersey for highest-placed all African team introduced.
2007	2008 route is announced, with a prologue to kick off proceedings in Knysna.
2008	2008 Absa Cape Epic: 28 March to 5 April. 966 km & 18 529m climbing, from Knysna to Lourensford. 1200 riders, 29% international and 41 countries represented. Winners: Roel Paulissen & Jakob Fuglsang.
2008	Team Absa, featuring South African celebrities and sports figures, riding for charity, launched.
2008	New route concept announced – multiple days in one stage location. Prologue to take place beneath Table Mountain.
2009	2009 Absa Cape Epic: 21 to 28 March. 744 km & 15 132m climbing, from Cape Town to Lourensford. 1200 riders, 32% international and 46 countries represented. Winners: Karl Platt & Stefan Sahm.
2010	2010 Absa Cape Epic: 21 to 28 March. 661 km & 14 126m climbing, from Dimersfontein to Lourensford. 1200 riders, 38% international and 51 countries represented. Winners: Karl Platt & Stefan Sahm.
2010	Freedom Ride on Robben Island, where a select group of riders had the opportunity to ride their bikes on Robben Island, including a tour and visit to Nelson Mandela's cell.
2010	Introduction of OUTCAST jersey. This jersey is given to any UCI pro-elite category rider whose partner is no longer participating in the race for any reason, allowing them to continue riding, so long as they do not provide physical assistance to any other UCI pro-elite rider or podium contender.
2010	Introduction of Men's floating trophy. If a team wins it 5 times, they will keep it.
2011	2011 Absa Cape Epic: 27 March to 3 April. 708 km & 14 550m climbing, from Tokai to Lourensford. 1200 riders, 40% international and 49 countries represented. Winners: Christoph Sauser & Burry Stander.
2011	Nine current and former world champions ride the 2011 Absa Cape Epic.
2011	The Women's race is awarded UCI (Union Cycliste Internationale) HC (Hors Categorie) status, allowing women to earn UCI points during the race.
2011	New logo was introduced along with a complete brand refresh. The new corporate identity was launched along with the 2012 Route.
2011	Grand Masters category, in which both riders must be 50 years or older, is announced for 2013.
2012	2012 Absa Cape Epic: 25 March to 1 April. 775 km & 16 300m climbing, from Meerendal to Lourensford. 1200 riders, 34% international and 49 countries represented. Winners: Christoph Sauser & Burry Stander.
2012	The first Exxaro Academy riders compete for the Exxaro Development Jersey. Exxaro established the academy to introduce mountain biking into historically disadvantaged communities, as a catalyst for change in South Africa.
2012	Introduction of Ladies' floating trophy. If a team wins it 5 times, they will keep it.
2012	Announcement that a rider caught doping at any time during the course of his/her career will be issued a lifetime ban from the race.
2013	Announcement of R1 million prize purse.
2013	2013 Absa Cape Epic: 17 to 24 March. 698 km & 15 900m climbing, from Meerendal to Lourensford. 13 World Champions riding, as well as Gold, Silver and Bronze from the 2012 London Olympics. Winners: Christoph Sauser & Jaroslav Kulhavý.
2013	First black South African woman finishes the Absa Cape Epic.
2014	World record prize money for Women's Purse. Triumph for women as 2014 Absa Cape Epic sets benchmark with R700 000 prize purse with the race's total prize purse for all categories now at R1 600 000.
2014	The Absa Cape Epic and Tracker introduce live tracking of all 600 participating teams over the course of the race.
2014	Live broadcast of the 2014 Absa Cape Epic Grand Finale to Europe.
2015	Introduction of a 21-minute television show dedicated to the women's race alone. Previously the women's race had been part of the overall broadcast.
2015	The Absa Cape Epic moves its headquarters from Loop Street to new, custom-designed offices at 21 Pepper Street in the Cape Town CBD.
2015	The Absa Cape Epic Grand Finale finishes at Meerendal Wine Estate for the first time. The estate had been the Prologue venue for the previous three years.
2015	The Prologue returns to the slopes of Table Mountain for the first time since 2009. It starts and finishes at the University of Cape Town.
2016	UCI-registered women would start in a separate group and are able to wear different logos on similarly coloured jerseys (to facilitate women from different trade teams riding together).
2016	In a world first for mountain bike events, the Absa Cape Epic included 360-degree immersive video of the pro peloton.
2016	A daily two-hour production of the race with a dedicated host was streamed live every day.
2016	A 45-minute daily chat show about the Absa Cape Epic day was streamed live every day. It included interviews with pro riders, and cycling experts and a behind-the-scenes look.
2016	In 2016 four riders started the race who had done every event since the launch in 2004. The Last Lions award was launched to celebrate their achievement and will award a Last Lion trophy to the last rider among them who is still in the event.
2016	Absa Cape Epic acquired by IRONMAN, which appoints race founder Kevin Vermaak as managing director of the Cape Epic global series.
2017	The Grand Finale finish is hosted at Val de Vie Estate in the Paarl/Franschhoek Valley for the first time.
2017	Grandstand Management wins the bid to host the 2018 UCI MTB World Cup opening event in Stellenbosch.
2017	First-place finishers in the Exxaro special jersey race win an eight-day stay at the renowned Bakala Academy in Leuven, Belgium in addition to their R50 000 prize money.
2017	The race has a second eBike rider – former professional Thomas Dietsch – to film the women's race by GoPro.
2017	Both the male and female Olympic gold medallists – Nino Schurter and Jenny Rissveds – tackle the 2017 Absa Cape Epic.
2020	Cancelled due to COVID
2021	Sina Frei and Laura Stigger win the women's race. Matthew Beers became the first South African men's winner, since Burry Stander, winning alongside Jordan Sarrou.
2022	Lukas Baum and Georg Egger sped to victory in Stage 7. Dark horses Speed Company Racing wore yellow for the first time after winning the final stage.
2023	Vera Looser and Kim le Court as well as Matthew Beers and Christopher Blevins, needed a stroke of luck to win the 2023 race. On the penultimate day, Amy Wakefield and Candice Lill suffered a catastrophic puncture, which cost them the women's race lead, while Georg Egger and Lukas Baum endured a major mechanical that took them 10 minutes to repair. Torrential rain in Lourensford helped set the scene for that misfortune.
2024	20th edition of the Absa Cape Epic. Ghost Factory Racing won all 8 stages in the women's race, but the margin of victory between Anne Terpstra and Nicole Koller, to Mona Mitterwahller and Candice Lill is the smallest yet. Matthew Beers and Howard Grotts defended Toyota Specialized Ninety One's title, seeing off challenges from Nino Schurter and Sebastian Fini, as well as Hans Becking and Wout Alleman.
2025	Nino Schurter returned with his new SCOTT SRAM teammate, Filippo Colombo, intent on winning the Absa Cape Epic. Faced fierce competition from Wilier Vittoria's Luca Braidot and Simone Avondetto, Colombo survived a hunger flatting on the final stage to help Schurter claim a third title, drawing him level with Stefan Sahm, Ariane Luthi, Jaroslav Kulhavy, and Matthew Beers on the all-time list. Sofía Gómez Villafañe helped Annika Langvad to the Dane's 6th title, on her first start in the race since 2019. Langvad remains the only rider never to finish off the top step of the Absa Cape Epic podium in 2 or more starts.
2026	After 5 second place finishes, Candice Lill won the Absa Cape Epic at the eighth time of asking. The South African and her Alessandra Keller won 7 of the 8 stages, holding off Kate Courtney and Greta Seiwald, as well as Vera Looser and Rosa van Doorn, who did not finish the race due to illness (Seiwald, Stage 6) and injury (Van Doorn, Stage 4). Matthew Beers and Tristan Nortje became the first all-African winners of the men's race, overturning a 13-second deficit on the final stage to relegate Wilier Vittoria to second for the second year in a row.

Past Winners

=== Men ===
Year	Team	Rider 1	Rider 2
2004	Focus/Rocky Mountain	Mannie Heymans (Namibia)	Karl Platt (Germany)
2005	Giant	Roel Paulissen (Belgium)	Bart Brentjens (Netherlands)
2006	Specialized	Christoph Sauser (Switzerland)	Silvio Bundi (Switzerland)
2007	Team Bulls	Karl Platt (Germany)	Stefan Sahm (Germany)
2008	Cannondale Vredestein	Roel Paulissen (Belgium)	Jakob Fuglsang (Denmark)
2009	Bulls	Karl Platt (Germany)	Stefan Sahm (Germany)
2010	Bulls 1	Karl Platt (Germany)	Stefan Sahm (Germany)
2011	36ONE-SONGO-SPECIALIZED	Christoph Sauser (Switzerland)	Burry Stander (South Africa)
2012	36ONE-SONGO-SPECIALIZED	Christoph Sauser (Switzerland)	Burry Stander (South Africa)
2013	Burry Stander - SONGO	Christoph Sauser (Switzerland)	Jaroslav Kulhavý (Czech Republic)
2014	Topeak-Ergon	Robert Mennen (Germany)	Kristian Hynek (Czech Republic)
2015	Investec-Songo-Specialized	Christoph Sauser (Switzerland)	Jaroslav Kulhavý (Czech Republic)
2016	Bulls	Karl Platt (Germany)	Urs Huber (Switzerland)
2017	Scott-SRAM	Nino Schurter (Switzerland)	Matthias Stirnemann (Switzerland)
2018	Specialized Racing	Jaroslav Kulhavý (Czech Republic)	Howard Grotts (United States)
2019	Scott-SRAM	Nino Schurter (Switzerland)	Lars Forster (Switzerland)
2021	NinetyOne-songo-Specialized	Matthew Beers (South Africa)	Jordan Sarrou (France)
2022	Speed Company Racing	Lukas Baum (Germany)	Georg Egger (Germany)
2023	Toyota-Specialized-NinetyOne	Matthew Beers (South Africa)	Christopher Blevins (United States)
2024	Toyota-Specialized-NinetyOne	Matthew Beers (South Africa)	Howard Grotts (United States)
2025	SCOTT SRAM	Nino Schurter (Switzerland)	Filippo Colombo (Switzerland)
2026	Toyota Specialized Imbuko	Matthew Beers (South Africa)	Tristan Nortje (South Africa)

=== Women ===
Year	Team	Rider 1	Rider 2
2004	Yellow Jacket	Hanlie Booyens (South Africa)	Sharon Laws (England)
2005	Fiat/Bianchi/Adidas	Zoe Frost (South Africa)	Hannele Steyn-Kotze (South Africa)
2006	adidas-Fiat-Rotwild	Sabine Grona (Germany)	Kerstin Brachtendorf (Germany)
2007	DURAVIT	Anke Erlank (South Africa)	Yolandè De Villiers (South Africa)
2008	Rocky Mountain	Pia Sundstedt (Finland)	Alison Sydor (Canada)
2009	Absa Ladies	Sharon Laws (England)	Hanlie Booyens (South Africa)
2010	Rothaus-CUBE	Kristine Noergaard (Denmark)	Anna-sofie Noergaard (Denmark)
2011	USN	Sally Bigham (England)	Karien van Jaarsveld (South Africa)
2012	Wheels4Life	Sally Bigham (England)	Esther Süss (Switzerland)
2013	Energas	Yolande Speedy (South Africa)	Catherine Williamson (England)
2014	RECM 2	Ariane Lüthi (Switzerland)	Annika Langvad (Denmark)
2015	RECM Specialized	Ariane Lüthi (Switzerland)	Annika Langvad (Denmark)
2016	Spur-Specialized	Ariane Lüthi (Switzerland)	Annika Langvad (Denmark)
2017	Meerendal CBC	Esther Süss (Switzerland)	Jennie Stenerhag (South Africa)
2018	Specialized Racing	Annika Langvad (Denmark)	Kate Courtney (United States)
2019	Investec Songo Specialized	Annika Langvad (Denmark)	Anna van der Breggen (Netherlands)
2021	NinetyOne Songo Specialized	Sina Frei (Switzerland)	Laura Stigger (Austria)
2022	NinetyOne Songo Specialized	Haley Batten (United States)	Sofía Gómez Villafañe (Argentina)
2023	Efficient Infiniti Insure	Kimberley Le Court (Mauritius)	Vera Looser (Namibia)
2024	GHOST Factory Racing	Anne Terpstra (Netherlands)	Nicole Koller (Switzerland)
2025	Toyota Specialized	Annika Langvad (Denmark)	Sofía Gómez Villafañe (Argentina)
2026	Thömus Maxon Sabi Sabi	Candice Lill (South Africa)	Alessandra Keller (Switzerland)

== Stage types ==
Recent editions of the Absa Cape Epic have started with a prologue followed by seven stages on the following seven days. The prologue is characteristically less than 30 km and held on a course that favours riders with technical skills. The stages normally range from between 80 km to 140 km. The longest stage in Absa Cape Epic history was the 146 km Stage 5 in 2008, which took riders from Swellendam to Bredasdorp.

== Mass and staggered start ==
In most stages of the race, teams start together, either in a mass start or in staggered, seeded group starts. As they roll out of the respective start towns, the teams are led by a vehicle, without racing. Once out of the neutral zone is the real start, setting riders on their way. The second member of the first team across the line wins. Riders in a group finish in the same time as the lead rider. Time bonuses for intermediate sprints have been offered in the past. Stage lengths usually vary between 60 km and 145 km. Long stages cause major shifts in the general classification and large time differences between teams. A maximum ride time is allotted for each day and teams must complete the stage within that time. If they arrive after their start group's maximum allotted time they will be listed as unofficial finishers.

== Time trial ==
Some years, an individual time trial appears midway through race week, this is a two-man team time trial, where teams usually leave at timed intervals. Like the prologue, it's an all out effort. The distance varies but typically is around 30 km, which is regarded by the main field, who are not contending for overall victory, as an 'easy' day.

== A brief history of the racing to date ==
2004
2004 saw Karl Platt team up with Namibian Mannie Heymans, one of the world's top marathoners at the time to win six out of the eight stages, with a 20-minute lead overall.

2005
In 2005, Olympic gold medalist and mountain biking legend Bart Brentjens partnered with Roel Paulissen to win the race.

2006
The Swiss team of Christoph Sauser and Silvio Bundi won this edition; previous winner Platt only managed 3rd, partnered with Carsten Bresser. This was to be the Absa Cape Epic's most convincing win yet, with Sauser and Bundi's 29min 08sec lead over Johannes Sickmuller and Christian Heule.

2007
Karl Platt formed a new team with Stefan Sahm, named the Bulls. They won the first stage in a tight race against Roel Paulissen and Jakob Fuglsang of Cannondale Vredestein. While this group had a back-and-forth battle throughout the week with the leader jerseys changing shoulders four times, Platt and Sahm ultimately won, wearing their yellow leaders' jerseys on the final stage into Lourensford Wine Estate.

2008
Roel Paulissen and Jakob Fuglsang returned and delivered a strong performance early on as the Bulls suffered. Though Cannondal Vredestein experienced tyre problems near Bredasdorp, they ultimately prevailed.

2009
The songo.info team, consisting of Burry Stander (from South Africa) and Cristoph Sauser (from Switzerland), won the first several stages but their hopes were dashed when Stander's front wheel was smashed. Ultimately the Bulls of Platt and Sahm won the competition.

2010
The Bulls entered the race as favorites, though Team MTN Qhubeka's Kevin Evans and Alban Lakata took the lead after Stage 1. As the race wore on, however, MTN Qhubeka experienced tyre failures and Stander won three stages—enough to push the Bulls over the finish line in first place.

2011
Burry Stander and Cristoph Sauser won 5 of 7 days, making Stander the first South African to win the Absa Cape Epic.

2012
Stander and Sauser again turned in a winning performance, beating team 360Life (Kevin Evans and David George) by almost 30 minutes.

2013
Team Burry Stander-Songo, Christoph Sauser and Jaroslav Kulhavý, won the 2013 Absa Cape Epic by 7:10. With this fourth win, Christoph Sauser tied Karl Platt for the most Absa Cape Epic victories. In second place in an overall time of 29:47.55,3 were Team Bulls' Karl Platt and new partner Urs Huber, followed by teammates Thomas Dietsch and Tim Boehme with a time of 30:07.35,9.

2014
Topeak Ergon's Kristian Hynek (Czech republic) and Robert Mennen (Germany) emerged as overall winners after a dramatic event in which the lead changed several times. Pre-race favourites Karl Platt (Germany) and Urs Huber (Switzerland) of the Bulls team pulled out on Stage 4 after the German, bidding for his fifth win, injured his knee in a crash. Switzerland's Christoph Sauser, also seeking to be the first to win five times, and his Czech partner Frantisek Rabon finished second after a race plagued by mechanical problems and punctures. The women's event was comfortably won by Ariane Lüthi (Switzerland) and Annika Langvad (Denmark) after they overcame a poor Stage 1 in which they too were plagued by punctures.

2015
Christoph Sauser because the first person to win the Absa Cape Epic five times after finishing with his partner Jaroslav Kulhavý. Defending champions Ariane Lüthi and Annika Langvad won the Women's category by more than an hour.

2016
Karl Platt of Germany manages to equal Christoph Sauser with his fifth Absa Cape Epic win when he sails to victory with racing partner Urs Huber as Team Bulls. Ariane Lüthi and Annika Langvad take home the women's trophy once again with a third consecutive win. The Women's category rule change ensuring that women started in a separate batch to the men made for exciting racing with Yana Belomoyna and Sabine Spitz claiming three stage wins from the reigning champions.

2017
The Swiss duo of Nino Schurter and Matthais Stirnemann (SCOTT-SRAM MTB Racing) were first time winners of the men's race after taking over the yellow zebra jersey on Stage 6 while Esther Süss and Jennie Stenerhag of Meerendal CBC claimed the Hansgrohe Women's category after taking the orange jersey at the end of Stage 1 and wearing it for the balance of the race.

2018
Jaroslav Kulhavy earned his third win on the men's side, partnering with American Howard Grotts as team Investec Songo Specialized. Annika Langvad and American newcomer Kate Courtney, also team Investec Songo Specialized, won every stage save one and won the overall event by 46 minutes.

== Organisation ==
The holding company of the Absa Cape Epic brand is named Cape Epic Pty Ltd and this events team is responsible for all that is required for a full service mountain bike stage race, including route design, logistics, planning and implementation.

== Prize money ==
In 2014 the Absa Cape Epic matched the women's prize purse to the men's prize purse for the first time. The increase to R700 000 for the women's category took the total prize purse for all categories to R1 600 000.

At the time this was the highest prize purse for women's cycling globally, including road races.

Alan Cameron, MD of Sasol Oil: "We’re delighted to be sponsoring the legendary Absa Cape Epic. This gruelling race demands exceptional performance from all riders, regardless of their gender. We believe the prize money should reflect this and we’re therefore proud to be increasing the women’s prize to equal that of the men".

== Doping ==
In December 2012 the Absa Cape Epic introduced a lifetime ban for all athletes found guilty of a doping offence.

Cyclist David George tested positive for a banned substance and was subsequently given a two-year ban from all competitive cycling. SAIDS indicated that only results dating back to 29 August 2012 - when its test was carried out - could be erased. Riding with Kevin Evans, he had finished second in the 2012 Absa Cape Epic which took place in March and the result therefore stood.

Kevin Vermaak, founder of the race, said at the time: "As of 1 January 2013, any athlete (professional or amateur) caught using performance-enhancing substances, whether at another event or out of competition, will be banned for life from participating in the Absa Cape Epic. Not only will the person not be allowed to participate (as an amateur rider or UCI- licensed elite), but the individual will also be banned from being involved on any level, including as a team manager. This is harsher than what is required currently by any federation, but is our considered opinion of what should be enforced even on a wider scale with regards to event participation of convicted dope cheats".

Vermaak continued: "We've chosen not to apply this retrospectively because we believe that would be naive. As has been exposed in recent months, cycling has a dark past. Many riders from this previous era have rediscovered the joy of cycling as mountain bikers and participate in the Absa Cape Epic as their expression of riding clean. Previous offenders, who have served their suspension term, may ride future Absa Cape Epics. We want to be part of the new era of cleaner cycling, and therefore only future offenders will receive the lifetime bans".

Subsequent to this decision several riders have been banned from riding in the Absa Cape Epic for life.

In spite of extensive testing there have, however, been only two positive in-competition doping tests at the Absa Cape Epic. Both were amateur riders.
