= Burry Stander =

South African mountain biker

Personal information
- Full name: Burry Willie Stander
- Nickname: The Dart
- Born: 16 September 1987 Port Shepstone, South Africa
- Died: 3 January 2013 (aged 25) Shelly Beach, South Africa
- Height: 1.73 m (5 ft 8 in)

Cycling career
- Sport: Cycling
- Discipline: Mountain bike racing
- Role: Rider
- Rider type: Cross-country

Major wins
- Mountain bike XC World Cup 2 individual wins (2009, 2012) Cape Epic (2011, 2012)
Medal record
Representing South Africa
Men's Mountain bike marathon
World Championships
Bronze medal – third place	2010 Sankt Wendel	Men's race

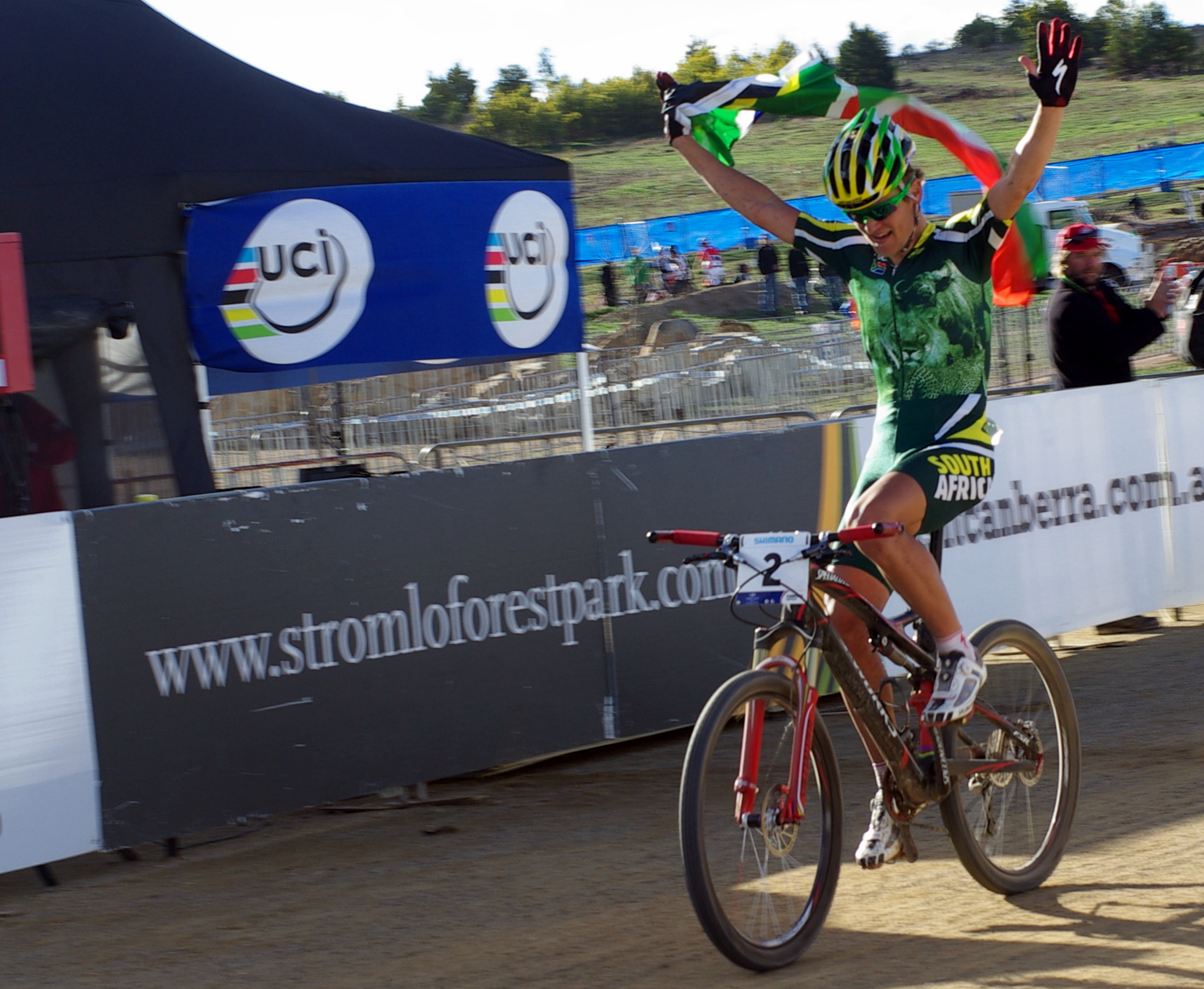
Cross-country mountain biking: competitor in the men's under 23 division at the 2009 UCI Mountain Bike and Trials World Championships held at Mount Stromlo, near Canberra, Australia. Stander wins the under 23 men's XC title.

Burry Willie Stander (16 September 1987 – 3 January 2013) was a South African mountain biker, the UCI Mountain Bike World Cup under-23 men's cross-country 2009 world champion.

In the 2008 Summer Olympics, held in Beijing, Stander finished 15th in the cross-country mountain bike race. In the 2012 Summer Olympics, held in London, Stander finished 5th in the cross-country mountain bike race.

Stander paired up with Christoph Sauser in 2009 for the Absa Cape Epic. Although the team only managed 6th place that year, they then came back in 2010 to claim 2nd place. Finally in 2011 Stander and Sauser finished in 1st place, making Stander the first South African rider to win the Absa Cape Epic. In 2012 the team were victorious once again, winning the Prologue and four of the seven stages of the marathon stage race.

Stander died on 3 January 2013 after being hit by a taxibus while finishing a training ride and returning to his Concept Cyclery Shop in South Africa. The KwaZulu-Natal minibus taxi driver who struck Stander down was convicted of culpable homicide on 17 April 2015 at the Port Shepstone Magistrates Court, and was sentenced to three years in prison.

== Career highlights ==
=== 2006 to 2007 ===
- 3 time U/19 SA XC and Marathon champion
- 10th Commonwealth Games 2006
- 17th U/23 World Championships 2006
- South African Pro XC champion 2006/2007
- 6th U/23 world championships 2007
- African XC MTB champion 2007
- sponsor GT Bicycles / Omnico SA

=== 2008 ===
- Mazda Drifter Barberton SA marathon series opener 1st
- 14th Giro del Capo Road Tour and second u/26 rider
- Absa Cape Epic stage win and leader for three stages (did not finish due to injury while leading)
- South Africa Cross Country champion
- 3rd U/23 SA Road Championships
- World Cup round 1 Houffalize Belgium 58th
- World Cup round 2 Offenburg Germany 7th
- World Cup round 3 Madrid, Spain 13th
- World Cup round 4 Vallnord, Andorra 2nd
- World Cup round 5 Fort William Scotland 5th
- World Cup round 6 Mont St Anne, Canada 3rd
- World Cup round 7 Bromont Canada 24th
- World Cup round 8 Canberra Australia 6th
- World Cup round 9 Schladming Austria 10th
- World Cup overall standings 5th
- World Cup u/23 champion
- U/23 World Championships 2nd
- Jeep Hill2Hill Marathon champion
- Summer Olympic Games in Beijing 15th
- Sponsor GT Bicycles / Omnico SA
- 2009 sponsors: Specialized Bikes, Mr Price, Oakley, Fever publications-weekly mountainbike column, Fast Fuel Nutrition, Crank Brothers Pedals, Garmin, Songo.info-charity involved in building BMX tracks for disadvantaged communities.

In 2010, Stander rode across the line in third place at the Mountain Bike World Championships in Mont-Sainte-Anne, Quebec, Canada.

He won the Absa Cape Epic back to back with team partner Christoph Sauser in 2011 and 2012.

In the 2012 Summer Olympic Games in London he finished 5th.

== Personal life ==
Stander hailed from Port Shepstone in KwaZulu-Natal where he attended an Afrikaans Primary and High School (Suid-Natal). He married fellow cyclist Cherise Taylor in May 2012 on the beach of Port Shepstone.
