= Chris Jongewaard =

Personal information
- Nickname: Jblood
- Born: 18 July 1979 (age 47) Adelaide, Australia

Cycling career
- Sport: Cycling
- Disciplines: Cyclo-cross; Mountain biking; Road
- Role: Rider/Coach

Amateur team
- 2012: Milka–Superior MTB Racing

Professional teams
- 2006: Savings & Loans Cycling Team
- 2007: The Jittery Joe's Pro Cycling Team
- 2008: Panasonic
- 2011: Team Budget Forklifts

Chris Jongewaard (born 18 July 1979) is an Australian former professional racing cyclist. For the mountain bike event at the 2008 Summer Olympics, Jongewaard lost his legal appeal to be included in the team after being excluded because of a car accident, involving another cyclist for which he was due to face court in late 2008. He represented his nation in the men's elite event at the 2016 UCI Cyclo-cross World Championships in Heusden-Zolder.

== Major results ==
=== Cyclo-cross ===
2014–2015
1st National Championships
2015–2016
2nd National Championships
2016–2017
1st National Championships
Qiansen Trophy

2nd Fengtai Station
3rd Yanqing Station

2017–2018
1st National Championships
1st Rapha Supercross Nobeyama #2
National Series

1st Round 5
2nd Round 6

2nd Rapha Supercross Nobeyama #1
2nd Utsunomiya
2018–2019
1st National Championships
3rd Utsunomiya Day 2
National Series

3rd Round 8
3rd Round 9

2019–2020
1st National Championships
1st Melbourne Grand Prix #1
1st Melbourne Grand Prix #2

=== Road ===
2005
1st Stage 1 (TTT) Herald Sun Tour
2006
2nd Overall Herald Sun Tour
2nd Grafton to Inverell Classic
9th Overall Tour Down Under
2008
1st Stage 4 Herald Sun Tour
2nd Grafton to Inverell Classic
2009
1st Time trial, Oceania Road Championships
5th Time trial, National Road Championships

=== MTB ===
2004
2nd National XCO Championships
2005
1st Oceania XCO Championships
1st National XCO Championships
2006
2nd National XCO Championships
3rd Oceania XCO Championships
2007
1st Oceania XCO Championships
1st National XCO Championships
2008
1st Oceania XCO Championships
1st National XCO Championships
2009
1st National XCO Championships
2011
1st Oceania XCO Championships
1st National XCO Championships
2013
1st National XCO Championships
