= Kevin Evans (cyclist) =

South African cyclist

Personal information
- Born: 6 June 1978 (age 48) Jozini, South Africa

Cycling career
- Sport: Cycling
- Current team: Retired
- Discipline: Road
- Role: Rider

Professional team
- 2008–2010: MTN

Kevin Evans (born 6 June 1978) is a former South African cyclist.

== Palmares ==
2008
1st Stage 5 Tour d'Egypte
3rd National Time Trial Championships
2010
1st National Time Trial Championships
2nd Giro del Capo
