= Cédric Ravanel =

French mountain biker

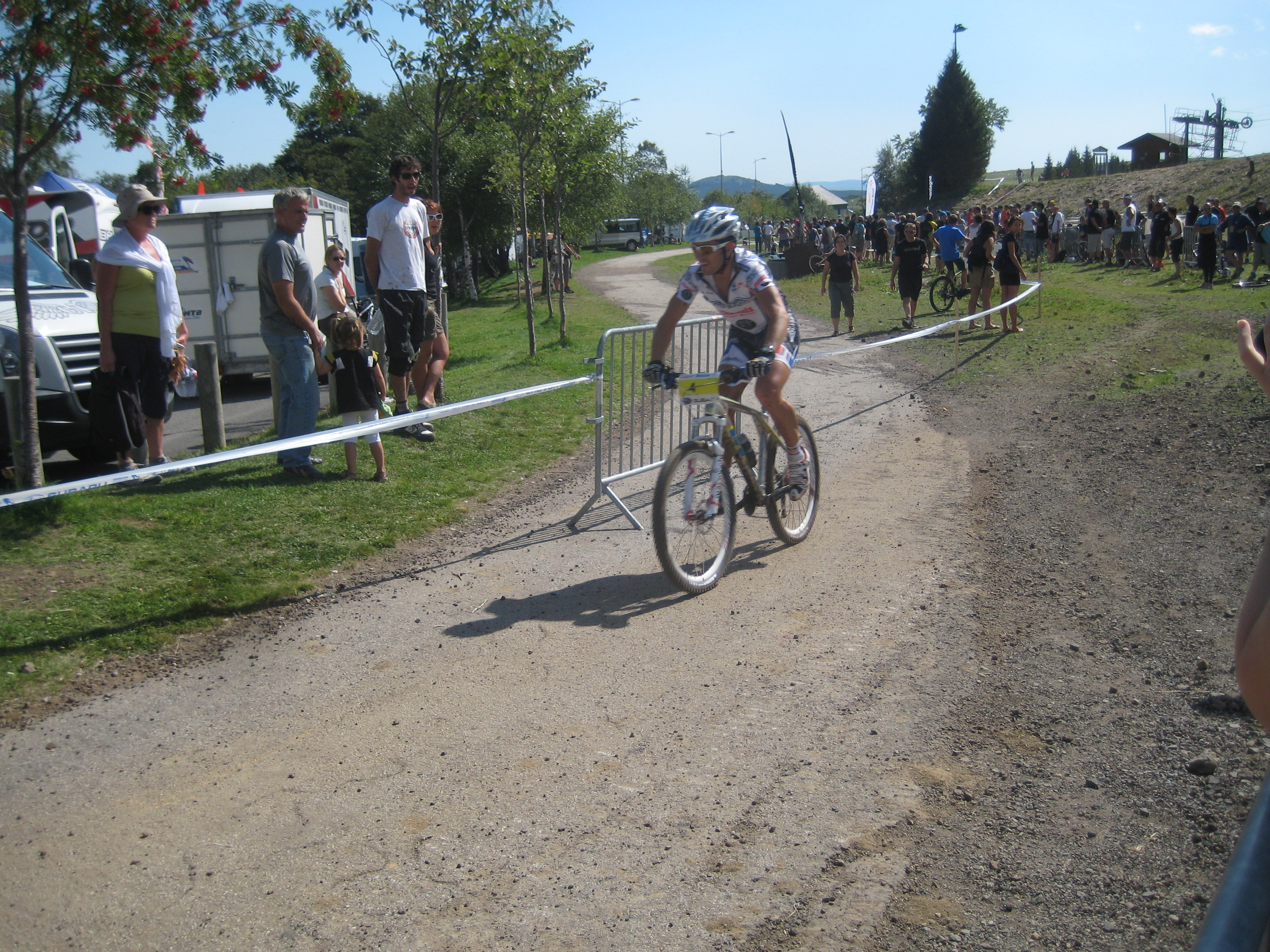
- Cédric Ravanel during the 2011 MTB French Cup

Personal information
- Full name: Cédric Ravanel
- Born: 26 November 1978 (age 47) Sallanches, France
- Height: 1.77 m (5 ft 10 in)
- Weight: 68 kg (150 lb)

Cycling career
- Sport: Cycling
- Discipline: Mountain biking
- Role: Rider
- Rider type: Cross-country

Professional teams
- 2002–2005: Orbea
- 2006–2008: Team Lapierre International
- 2009–2010: Lapierre International
- 2011–: GT Skoda Chamonix
Medal record
Representing France
Men's mountain bike racing
World Championships
Silver medal – second place	2004 Les Gets	Cross-country
Silver medal – second place	2002 Kaprun	Team relay

Cédric Ravanel (born 26 November 1978 in Sallanches, Haute-Savoie) is a French former professional mountain biker. He won two silver medals in men's cross-country racing at the 2004 UCI World Championships in Les Gets, and at the second stage of the 2007 UCI World Cup series in Offenburg, Germany. Ravanel also represented his nation France at the 2008 Summer Olympics, and has been training and racing professionally for numerous seasons on Team Lapierre International and GT Skoda Chamonix.

Ravanel qualified for the French squad, along with his teammates Jean-Christophe Péraud and defending Olympic champion Julien Absalon in the men's cross-country race at the 2008 Summer Olympics in Beijing, by receiving one of the nation's three available berths from the French Cycling Association (French: Fédération Française de Cyclisme) and the Union Cycliste Internationale based on his best performance at the World Championships, World Cup series, and Mountain Biking World Rankings. Ravanel rounded out his team's roster as the third Frenchman to complete a 4.8-km sturdy, treacherous cross-country course, finishing outside the two-hour barrier and picking up a fourteenth spot in 2:01:38.

== Career achievements ==
2004
2nd French MTB Championships (Cross-country), Montgenèvre (FRA)
(silver) UCI World Championships (Cross-country), Les Gets (FRA)
2006
2nd French MTB Championships (Cross-country), France
2007
2nd French MTB Championships (Cross-country), Montgenèvre (FRA)
(silver) Stage 2, UCI World Cup (Cross-country), Offenburg (GER)
2008
3rd French MTB Championships (Cross-country), France
14th Olympic Games (Cross-country), Beijing (CHN)
