= Lukáš Sáblík =

Czech ice hockey player

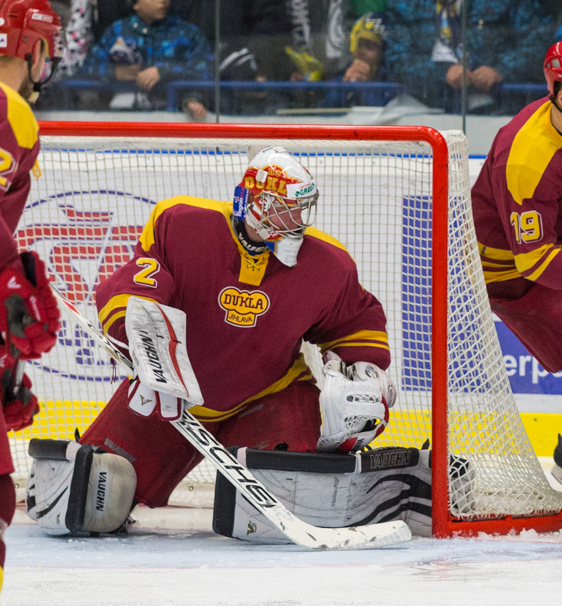
- Lukáš Sáblík
- Born: August 5, 1976 (age 49) Jihlava, Czechoslovakia
- Height: 6 ft 3 in (191 cm)
- Weight: 207 lb (94 kg; 14 st 11 lb)
- Position: Goaltender
- Catches: Right
- Czech.1 team Former teams: HC Dukla Jihlava; HC Zlin; HC Karlovy Vary; Orli Znojmo; HKM Zvolen; HC České Budějovice
- Playing career: 1995–present

Lukáš Sáblík (born August 5, 1976 in Jihlava) is a Czech professional ice hockey goaltender currently playing with HC Dukla Jihlava of the 1. národní hokejová liga (Czech.1). He previously played with HC Karlovy Vary in the Czech Extraliga during the 2010–11 Czech Extraliga season.
