= Jan Škarnitzl =

Czech cross-country mountain biker (born 1986)

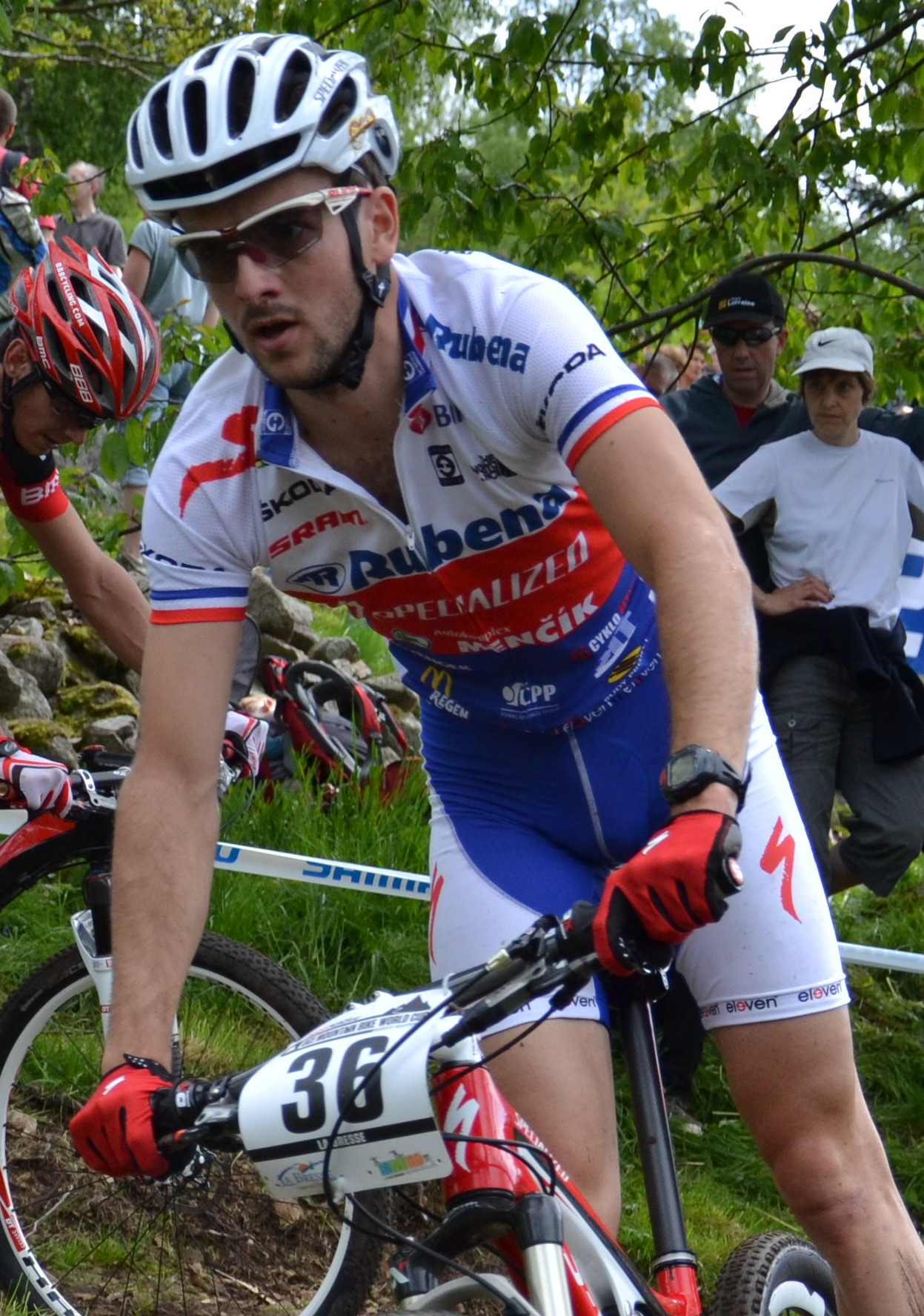
- Jan Škarnitzl at the World Cup race in La Bresse (2012)

Personal information
- Born: 11 July 1986 (age 40) Brandýs nad Labem-Stará Boleslav
- Height: 1.79 m (5 ft 10 1/2 in)
- Weight: 66 kg (146 lb)

Cycling career
- Sport: Cycling
- Disciplines: Mountain bike racing, Cyclo-cross
- Role: Rider
- Rider type: Cross-country
Medal record
Representing Czech Republic
Men's mountain bike racing
World University Cycling Championship
Bronze medal – third place	2008 Nijmegen	Cross-country

Jan Škarnitzl (Czech pronunciation: [ˈjan ˈʃkarɲɪtsl̩]; born 11 July 1986) is a Czech cross-country mountain biker. At the 2012 Summer Olympics, he competed in the Men's cross-country at Hadleigh Farm, finishing in 12th place.

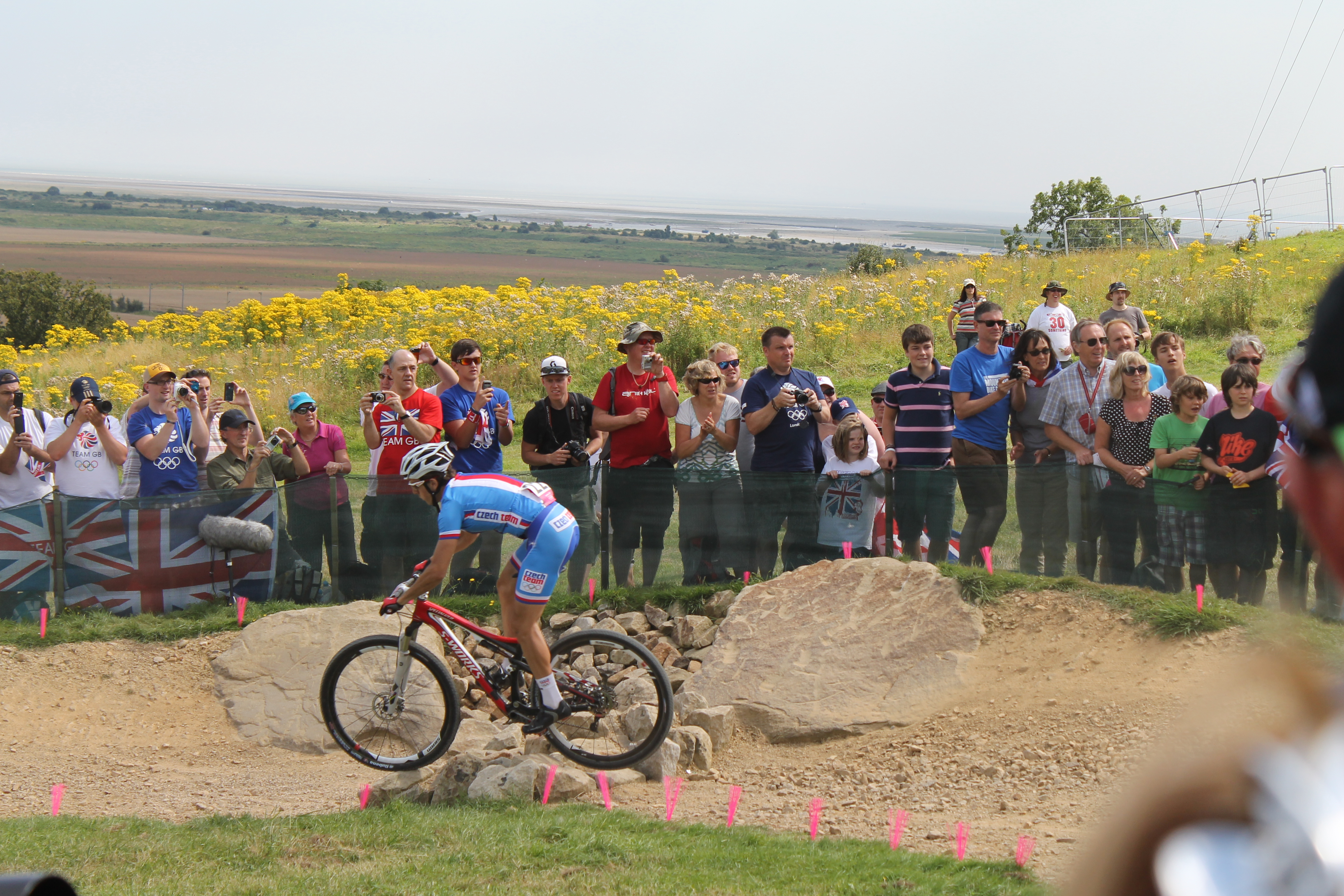
Jan Škarnitzl at the 2012 Summer Olympics
