= Roel Paulissen =

Belgian cyclist (born 1976)

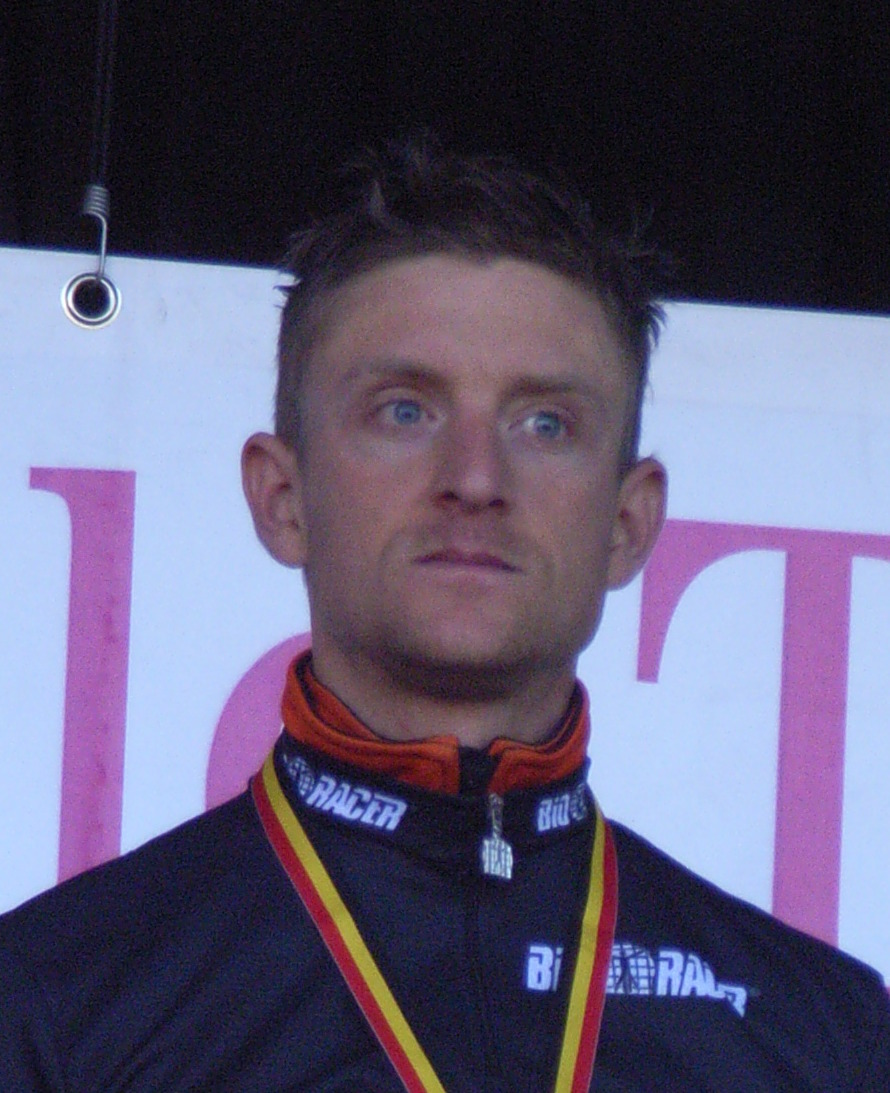

Personal information
- Full name: Roel Paulissen
- Born: 27 April 1976 (age 50) Hasselt, Belgium
- Height: 1.81 m (5 ft 11 1/2 in)
- Weight: 65 kg (143 lb)

Cycling career
- Sport: Cycling
- Disciplines: Mountain biking Road
- Role: Rider
- Rider type: Cross-country

Professional teams
- 1996–1999: American Eagle
- 2000–2001: Team GT
- 2001: Rainer Wurz-Sud Tirol
- 2001: Lotto–Adecco
- 2002: Lanabau-Rainer Wurz
- 2003–2004: Siemens Mobile
- 2004–2008: Jong Vlaanderen
- 2007–2008: Cannondale-Vredestein
- 2009–2010: Cannondale Factory Racing
- 2013: Torpado

Major wins
- Cape Epic (2005, 2008)
Medal record
Representing Belgium
Men's mountain bike marathon
World Championships
Gold medal – first place	2008 Villabassa	Men's race
Gold medal – first place	2009 Graz	Men's race
Silver medal – second place	2007 Verviers	Men's race
Bronze medal – third place	2006 Oisans	Men's race
Men's mountain bike racing
World Championships
Bronze medal – third place	2003 Lugano	Cross-country
Bronze medal – third place	1998 Mont Sainte-Anne	Under-23 Cross-country
European Championships
Bronze medal – third place	2000 Rhenen	Cross-country
Bronze medal – third place	2002 Zürich	Cross-country

Roel Paulissen (born 27 April 1976 in Hasselt) is a Belgian former professional mountain biker. Throughout his sporting career since 1993, he has won more than ten Belgian national championship titles, mounted top-five finishes at both the European and World Cup series, and claimed a total of four medals, including two golds, in men's cross-country race at the UCI Mountain Bike World Championships. Paulissen also represented his nation Belgium in four editions of the Olympic Games (1996, 2000, 2004, and 2008), where he competed in men's mountain biking since it officially became an Olympic sport in 1996. By the start of the 2010 season, Paulissen had been overshadowed by a doping issue after he tested positive for clomiphene that sidelined and effectively ended his mountain biking career. Having lifted a two-year suspension from doping in early 2013, Paulissen came out from his short retirement to join and race professionally for the Italian team Torpado.

== Racing career ==
=== Early years ===
Born and raised in Hasselt, Paulissen discovered and started cycling at the age of sixteen, when he purchased his first ever mountain bike. He took part in numerous regional and local races across Belgium, and soon joined the Ghislain Cycles Club by the following year. In the summer of 1994, Paulissen surprisingly earned his first trophy under the junior category at the Belgian Championships. Because of his exquisite talent and prowess in the sport, Paulissen offered a spot to train and race professionally for the Dutch team called the American Eagle two years later.

=== International career ===
Paulissen officially made his international debut for Belgium at the 1996 Summer Olympics in Atlanta, where he finished seventeenth in the inaugural men's cross-country race with a time of 2:33:53.

At the 2000 Summer Olympics in Sydney, Paulissen could not match his best possible ride from Atlanta with a nineteenth-place effort in the same program, posting an official time of 2:16:54.

In 2001, Paulissen became an elite professional rider by officially signing an exclusive, two-year sponsorship contract with Italy's Rainer Wurz MTB Team, and then capped off his season by mounting four top-ten finishes at the UCI World Cup series. With a sudden departure of his teammate and Olympic silver medalist Filip Meirhaeghe because of a doping issue, Paulissen continued to refurnish and penetrate Belgium's cycling success by earning his first World Cup triumph in Houffalize, and a prestigious bronze medal in men's cross-country race at the 2003 UCI World Championships in Lugano, Switzerland. Strong results landed him a place on the Siemens Mobile-Cannondale pro cycling team, followed by his short stint with Belgium's Jong Vlaanderen 2016 at the start of the 2004 season.

While competing for his third Belgian squad at the 2004 Summer Olympics in Athens, Paulissen scored a career-high, fourth place in the men's cross-country race with a time of 2:18:10, finishing just off the podium by more than a minute. In that same year, Paulissen managed to earn another triumph on the second stage of the UCI World Cup series in Houffalize, and eventually edged out his teammate Meirhaeghe to take home the overall silver medal in the final round of the circuit. In 2005, Paulissen took a year off from mountain biking after he was suddenly stricken with rib injuries, fever, and acute bronchitis that prompted his decision to skip from the World Cup series and the Belgian Championships.

In 2006, Paulissen left his team Jong Vlaanderen 2016 for health reasons and long absence to join the Netherlands' Cannondale-Vredestein. He also capped his successful season by collecting the bronze medal in men's marathon race at the UCI World Championships in Oisans, France. A year later, Paulissen continued to flourish his ample success in mountain biking by reclaiming the Belgian national championship title, and later adding a silver to his career hardware at the UCI World Championships in Verviers, trailing behind Switzerland's Christoph Sauser by more than five minutes.

Paulissen won his first Absa Cape Epic in 2005 with team member Bart Brentjens. He then came back again in 2007 with new partner Jakob Fuglsang, placing 2nd place overall. The team then competed in the marathon stage race again in 2008, this time claiming 1st place after 2 stage wins.

=== 2008 season ===
Paulissen started his 2008 season by defending the men's cross-country race title at the Belgian Championships and by taking part in the Roc d'Azur MTB Marathon tournament, where he registered two more triumphs in the process. In July, Paulissen grabbed his first major success in men's marathon race at the UCI World Championships in Villabassa under a more controversial decision. With only 70 meters left to go, Paulissen held off a sprint duel match against Switzerland's Christoph Sauser for a spectacular finish, until they suddenly made contact with their handlebars and arms near the barrier and then both crashed. Being the first man up after hitting the tarmac hard, Paulissen reluctantly carried his broken bike towards the finish, while his rival Sauser remounted his lead to cross the line first, but ended his campaign with a protest. After the race, the UCI officials decided that Sauser was relegated to second place for riding "dangerously" in the sprint and instead Paulissen was declared the World champion with a time of 4:46:56. Following his controversial triumph, Paulissen admitted, "I am very happy with this success. Unfortunately, this great race in the area where I live ended this way, but I think the jury was right."

Twelve years after his official Olympic debut, Paulissen qualified for his fourth Belgian squad, as a 32-year-old and a cycling team captain, in the men's cross-country race at the 2008 Summer Olympics in Beijing by receiving one of the nation's three available berths for his team from the Union Cycliste Internationale (UCI), based on his top-ten performance at the World Cup series, World Championships, and Mountain Biking World Series. He successfully completed a 4.8-km sturdy, treacherous cross-country course with a nineteenth-place effort in 2:03:30, radically shortening his chances to climb the Olympic podium on his fourth bid.

=== Post-Olympics ===
Paulissen started the 2009 season by claiming his tenth Belgian national championship title, and by signing an exclusive, two-year sponsorship contract with Germany's Cannondale Factory Racing pro team. He also defended his men's marathon race title and rainbow jersey at the UCI World Championships in Graz, Austria with a time of 4:34:46, edging out the home nation's Alban Lakata on another tight, sprinted duel match by fifty-one seconds.

On 16 July 2010 Paulissen had been overshadowed by a doping issue after he tested positive for a banned hormone substance clomiphene, mainly used to avert infertility problems. Breaching the team's clear anti-doping policies, Cannondale Factory Racing team had decided to end its sponsorship with Paulissen and consequently drop him off the roster. Moreover, he ordered a two-year suspension from the Union Cycliste Internationale (UCI) for failing the doping test, missing a chance to defend his Belgian national championship title and pursue for his fifth Olympic bid. With an immediate effect from an issue, Paulissen shortly and suddenly ended his sporting career.

Having lifted a two-year doping suspension in November 2012, Paulissen announced his official comeback from a short retirement to join and ride for Italy's Torpado Surfing Shop Team at the start of the 2013 season.

== Career achievements ==
1996
1st Belgian MTB Championships (Cross-country, U23), Belgium
17th Olympic Games (Cross-country), Atlanta, Georgia, (USA)
1998
(silver) European Championships (Cross-country, U23), Belgium
(bronze) UCI World Championships (Cross-country, U23), Switzerland
1999
1st Belgian MTB Championships (Cross-country, U23), Belgium
4th UCI World Championships (Cross-country, U23), Sweden
2000
1st Belgian MTB Championships (Cross-country), Belgium
(bronze) European Championships (Cross-country), Netherlands
19th Olympic Games (Cross-country), Sydney, (AUS)
2001
2nd Belgian MTB Championships (Cross-country), Belgium
(bronze) UCI World Cup (Cross-country), Kaprun (AUT)
2002
1st Belgian MTB Championships (Cross-country), Belgium
(silver) UCI World Cup (Cross-country), Houffalize (BEL)
(bronze) European Championships (Cross-country), Lausanne (SUI)
(bronze) UCI World Cup (Cross-country), Madrid (ESP)
2003
1st Belgian MTB Championships (Cross-country), Belgium
1st Overall, Grouse Mountain Bike, Canada
(bronze) UCI World Championships (Cross-country), Lugano (SUI)
2004
2nd Belgian MTB Championships (Cross-country), Belgium
(silver) Overall, UCI World Cup (Cross-country)

(gold) Stage 2, Houffalize (BEL) & Stage 3, Livigno (ITA)
(silver) Stage 1, Madrid (ESP)

3rd Alpago Trophy, Chies d'Alpago (ITA)
4th Olympic Games (Cross-country), Athens, (GRE)
2005
1st Cape Epic, Cape Town (RSA)
1st Overall, Roc d'Azur (Marathon), France
(silver) Stage 1, UCI World Cup (Cross-country), Spa Francorchamps (BEL)
(silver) Stage 6, UCI World Cup (Cross-country), Santa Catarina (BRA)
2006
1st Stage 2, Sunshine Cup, Cyprus
3rd Belgian MTB Championships (Cross-country), Bastogne (BEL)
(bronze) UCI World Championships (Marathon), Oisans (FRA)
4th Stage 1, UCI World Cup (Cross-country), Curaçao (AHO)
5th Stage 2, UCI World Cup (Cross-country), Madrid (ESP)
5th Stage 3, UCI World Cup (Cross-country), Spa Francorchamps (BEL)
2007
1st Belgian MTB Championships (Cross-country), Belgium
1st Belgian MTB Championships (Marathon), Eijsden (NED)
1st Overall, Afxentia Stage Race, Cyprus

2nd Stage 1 & 3
3rd Stage 2

2nd Overall Absa Cape Epic (Marathon)
(silver) UCI World Championships (Marathon), Verviers (BEL)
4th Overall, UCI World Cup (Cross-country)

(bronze) Stage 3, Champéry (SUI)
4th Stage 4, Houffalize (BEL)
5th Stage 2, Maribor (SLO)

2008
1st Belgian MTB Championships (Cross-country), Malmedy (BEL)
1st Roc d'Azur (Cross-country & marathon), France
1st Mountain, Sunshine Cup, Voroklini (CYP)
(gold) UCI World Championships (Marathon), Villabassa (ITA)
1st Stage 1, Afxentia Stage Race, Cyprus
1st Overall Absa Cape Epic (Marathon)
2nd Stage 3, Afxentia Stage Race, Cyprus
7th UCI World Championships (Cross-country), Val di Sole (ITA)
7th Stage 8, UCI World Cup (Cross-country), Canberra (AUS)
8th Stage 1, UCI World Cup (Cross-country), Houffalize (BEL)
12th Stage 4, UCI World Cup (Cross-country), Vallnord (AND)
19th Olympic Games (Cross-country), Beijing (CHN)
22nd Stage 5, UCI World Cup (Cross-country), Fort William (GBR)
2009
1st Belgian MTB Championships (Cross-country), Belgium
(gold) UCI World Championships (Marathon), Graz (AUT)
2010
1st Stage 3, Belgacom Grand Prix, Verviers (BEL)
6th Stage 4, Belgacom Grand Prix, Averbode (BEL)
12th Stage 3, UCI World Cup (Cross-country), Offenburg (GER)
14th Stage 2, UCI World Cup (Cross-country), Houffalize (BEL)
2013
2nd Belgian MTB Championships (Marathon), Belgium
12th Roc d'Azur (Marathon), France
19th UCI World Championships (Marathon), Kirchberg (AUT)
2017
1st Belgian MTB Championships (Marathon), Belgium
