= Christoph Sauser =

Swiss cyclist

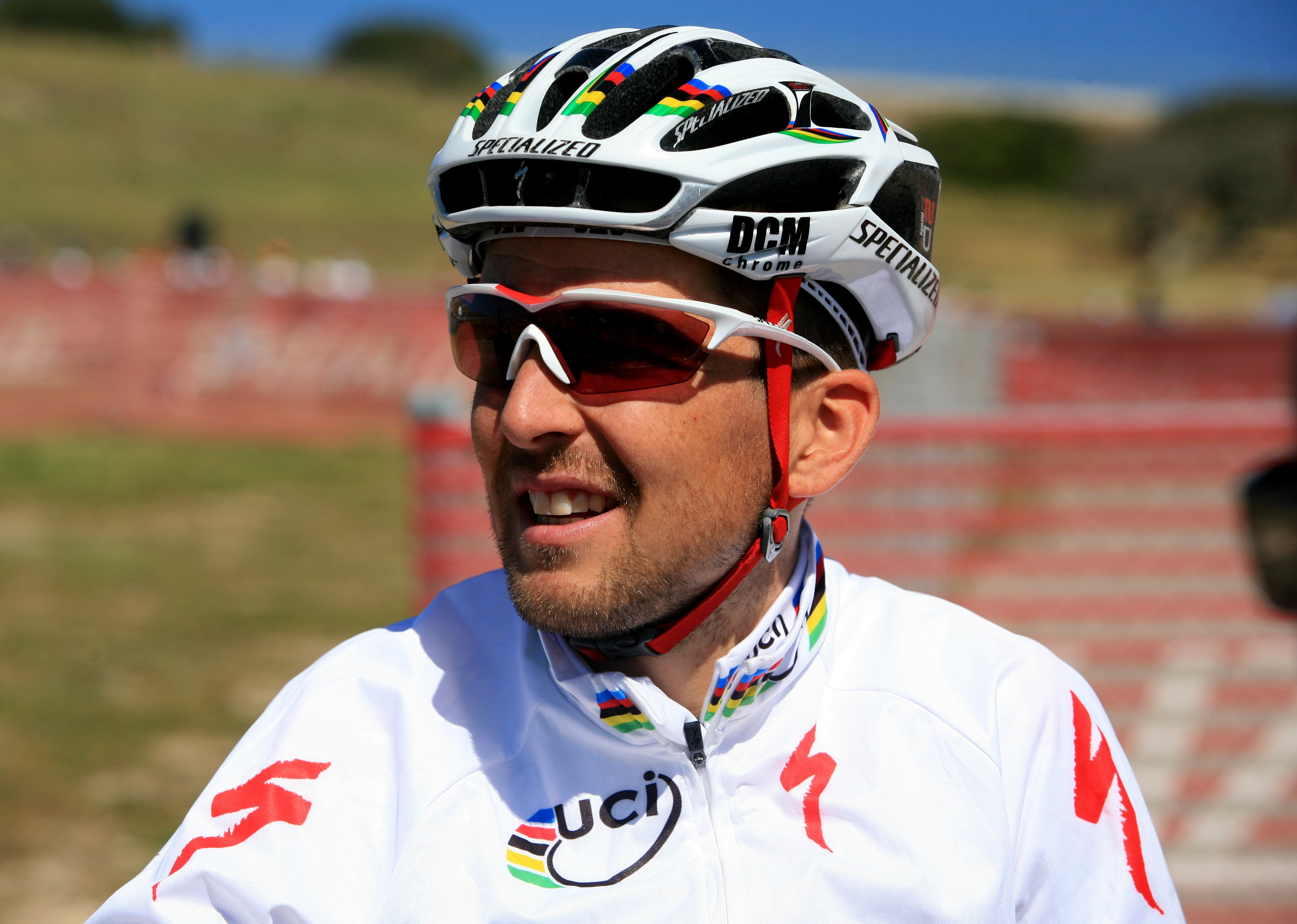
- Christoph Sauser in the World Champion's kit

Personal information
- Full name: Christoph Sauser
- Born: 13 April 1976 (age 50) Sigriswil, Switzerland

Cycling career
- Sport: Cycling
- Discipline: Mountain bike
- Role: Rider
- Rider type: Cross-country, marathon

Major wins
- Mountain bike World Marathon Championships (2007, 2011, 2013) XC World Cup (2004, 2005) 12 individual wins (1999, 2001–2006, 2008) Cape Epic (2006, 2011, 2012, 2013, 2015)
Medal record
Representing Switzerland
Men's mountain bike racing
Olympic Games
Bronze medal – third place	2000 Sydney	Cross-country
World Championships
Gold medal – first place	2008 Val di Sole	Cross Country
Silver medal – second place	2005 Livigno	Cross Country
Silver medal – second place	2006 Rotorua	Cross Country
Bronze medal – third place	2001 Vail	Cross Country
Men's Mountain bike marathon
World Championships
Gold medal – first place	2007 Verviers	Marathon
Gold medal – first place	2011 Montello	Marathon
Silver medal – second place	2008 Niederdorf	Marathon
Silver medal – second place	2015 Selva di Val Gardena	Marathon
Bronze medal – third place	2009 Graz/Stattegg	Marathon
Bronze medal – third place	2014 Pietermaritzburg	Marathon

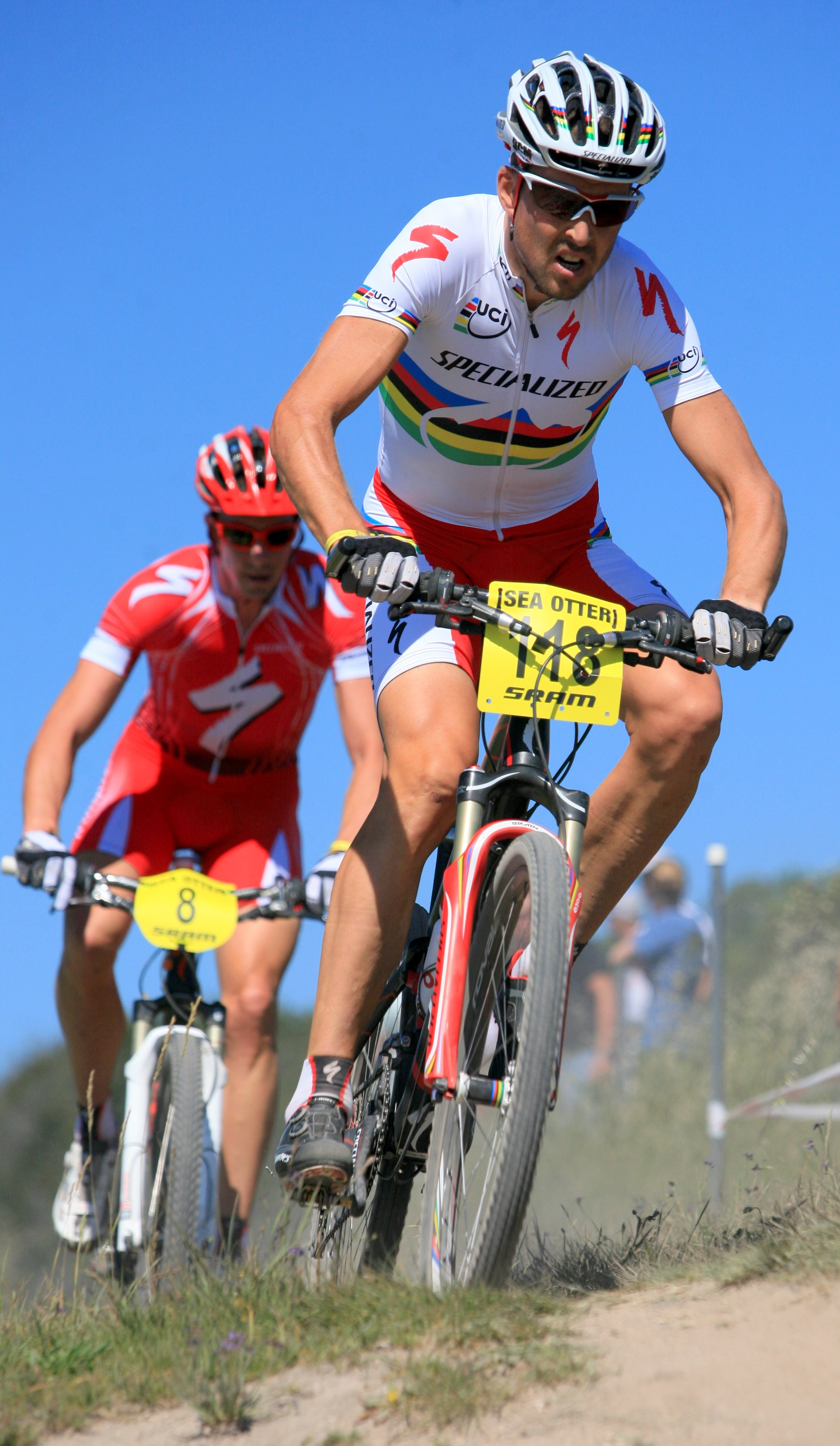
Christoph Sauser, leading teammate Todd Wells early in the Elite Men's Short Track race at the 2009 Sea Otter Classic in Laguna Seca, CA.

Christoph Sauser (born 13 April 1976 in Sigriswil, Switzerland) is a cross-country mountain biker who won the bronze medal at the 2000 Summer Olympics in Sydney, Australia. He currently races on the Specialized Cross Country Team.

He was the overall winner of the UCI World Cup in 2004 and 2005, along with taking 2nd in 2002 and 2003, with a 3rd place in 2001. He has won a total of 10 World Cups.

In 2006 Sauser won his first Absa Cape Epic with partner Silvio Bundi. He then partnered up with Burry Stander winning back to back in 2011 and 2012. Sauser partnered up with Jaroslav Kulhavý in 2013, once again claiming 1st in the marathon stage race. At the 2015 Absa Cape Epic Sauser rode himself in the race's history books by becoming the first person to win it a landmark five times, after which he retired from professional racing. In March 2017 Sauser came out of retirement in a bid to win his sixth Absa Cape Epic. In spite of being in good form he and partner Jaroslav Kulhavý (Investec Songo Specialized) finished second to Nino Schurter and Matthias Stirnemann (Scott-Sram). The Sauser/Kulhavy combination was hampered by punctures at critical times.

He won first place in the 2008 Mountain Bike World Championships, came second in the 2005 edition, and third in 2001. He has been Swiss champion four times. In his early years of racing he started in both XC and DH races. He is one of the top mountain bikers in the last few years.

== Major results ==
1999
1st Cross-country, National Championships
3rd Overall UCI XCO World Cup

1st Big Bear Lake
2nd Plymouth

2000
1st Cross-country, National Championships
3rd Cross-country, Olympic Games
2001
1st Cross-country, National Championships
3rd Cross-country, UCI World Championships
5th Overall UCI XCO World Cup

1st Grouse Mountain
2nd Leysin

2002
1st Cross-country, National Championships
2nd Overall UCI XCO World Cup

1st Houffalize
2nd Les Gets
2nd Grouse Mountain

2003
1st Cross-country, National Championships
2nd Overall UCI XCO World Cup

1st Sankt Wendel
2nd Mont-Sainte-Anne
2nd Grouse Mountain

2004
1st Overall UCI XCO World Cup

1st Fort William
2nd Mont-Sainte-Anne
2nd Livigno
2nd Calgary
2nd Houffalize

2005
1st Overall UCI XCO World Cup

1st Willingen
1st Angel Fire
1st Mont-Sainte-Anne
2nd Houffalize
2nd Fort William
3rd Madrid

2nd Cross-country, UCI World Championships
2006
National Championships

1st Cross-country
1st Marathon

2nd Cross-country, UCI World Championships
2nd Cross-country, UEC European Championships
2nd Overall UCI XCO World Cup

1st Mont-Sainte-Anne
1st Schladming
2nd Madrid

2007
1st Marathon, UCI World Championships
1st Marathon, UEC European Championships
3rd Overall UCI XCO World Cup

2nd Maribor
2nd Champéry
3rd Houffalize

2008
1st Cross-country, UCI World Championships
2nd Marathon, UCI World Championships
2nd Cross-country, UEC European Championships
2nd Overall UCI XCO World Cup

1st Vallnord
1st Schladming
2nd Offenburg
3rd Fort William
3rd Houffalize

2009
3rd Marathon, UCI World Championships
2011
1st Marathon, UCI World Championships
UCI XCO World Cup

3rd Windham

2012
1st Marathon, National Championships
2013
1st Marathon, UCI World Championships
1st Marathon, National Championships
2nd Marathon, UEC European Championships
2014
1st Marathon, UEC European Championships
3rd Marathon, UCI World Championships
2015
2nd Marathon, UCI World Championships
