= Cohutta 100 =

US ultra-endurance mountain bike race

Race details
- Date: Late April
- Region: Cohutta Wilderness, Tennessee & Georgia
- Discipline: Mountain Bike
- Type: 100 Mile Ultra Endurance

History
- First edition: 2006

The Cohutta 100 is an ultra-endurance 100 mile (162 km) mountain bike race held annually in late April. The race starts and ends at the Ocoee Whitewater Center in Copperhill, Tennessee. The course is one large loop through the Cohutta Wilderness area with approximately 35% single-track and 60% remote forest service roads, and a total of over 12,000 feet of elevation gain. One of the most challenging parts is the numerous small but very steep climbs.

The race has been one of the stops of the National Ultra Endurance Series since 2006. Jeff Schalk holds the record for the best finish time, 6:23 in 2009. Carla Williams set the female record of 7:29 in 2016.

The 2015 Cohutta 100 Course displayed over Open Street Map Data

== Results ==
Year	Male Winner	Finish Time	Female Winner	Finish Time
2019	Dylan Johnson	6:57	Jenns Troops	8:34
2018	Dylan Johnson	6:44	Lauren Cantwell	8:05
2017	Dylan Johnson	5:38	Carla Williams	6:50
2016	Dylan Johnson	6:42	Carla Williams	7:29
2015	Brian Schworm	6:55	Amanda Carey	8:49
2014	Jeremiah Bishop	7:26	Brenda Simril	9:34
2013	Jeremiah Bishop	7:01	Cheryl Sornson	8:31
2012	Christian Tanguy	6:28	Cheryl Sornson	7:34
2011	Christian Tanguy	6:27	Amanda Carey	7:33
2010	Jeff Schalk	6:49	Amanda Carey	8:04
2009	Jeff Schalk	6:23	Carey Lowery	8:06
2008	Jeff Schalk	6:48	Pua Sawicki	7:44
2007	Chris Eatough	6:45	Danielle Musto	8:34
2006	Mark Hendershot	7:49	Karen Masson	8:36

== See also ==
- Wilderness 101 Mountain Bicycle Race
- Mohican MTB 100
- Lumberjack 100
- Shenandoah 100
- Breckenridge 100
