= National Ultra Endurance Series =

Mountain bike race series

The National Ultra Endurance Series (NUE) is an ultra-endurance mountain bike race series in the United States. It was established in 2006 in order to bring national visibility to ultra-endurance mountain bike racing.

The number of races has varied from year to year. Each of the races is approximately 100 miles (160 km) long and primarily off-road. The title of series champion is awarded to the racer with the four best results in each of the following categories: Men's Open, Women's Open, Men's Masters (age 50+), and Single speed. Any ties are broken by the placing results in the final race of the series.

== History ==
In the past, there were requirements to finish at least one race West of the Mississippi River and one race East of the Mississippi. That requirement has been dropped. The list below includes those races that will be in the 2017 series. Some of these races were run before joining the NUE series.

Typical Date	Event name	Location	Years in Series
Mid-March	True Grit Epic	St George, Utah	2010 to present
Late April	Cohutta 100	Ducktown, Tennessee	2006 to present
Early June	Mohican MTB 100	Loudonville, Ohio	2006 to present
Mid June	Lumberjack 100	Wellston, Michigan	2006 to present
Early July	Tatanka 100	Sturgis, South Dakota	2013 to present
Mid July	High Cascades 100	Bend, Oregon	2010 to present
Late July	Wilderness 101	Coburn, Pennsylvania	2006 to present
Late July	Breckenridge 100	Breckenridge, Colorado	2006 to 2012, 2017–present
Early August	Pierre's Hole 100	Alta, Wyoming	xxxx to present
Late August	Hampshire 100	Greenfield, New Hampshire	xxxx to present
Early September	Rincon Challenge 100	Liberia, Costa Rica	2012 to present
Early September	Shenandoah 100	Stokesville, Virginia	2006 to present
Mid September	Fool's Gold 100	Dahlonega, Georgia	2008 to present
Late September	Big Bear Grizzly 100	Big Bear Lake, California	2017 to present

The series used to include the following events:

- Syllamo's Revenge 125k in Arkansas - 2011 to 2013
- Tahoe-Sierra 100 in California - 2008 to 2009
- The Endurance 100 in Utah - 2007
- Bailey Hundo in |Bailey, Colorado 2006 to 2016 (Now in the shorter NUE series)
- Fool's Gold 100 in Dahlonega, Georgia 2008 to 2016

== Series Champions ==
Year	Men's Open Champion	Women's Open Champion	Men's Master Champion	Men's Single Speed Champion
2020			Greg Golet	Justin Holle
2019	Dylan Johnson	Chase Edwards	Tom Stritzinger	Eli Orth
2018	Bryan Lewis	Larissa Connors	Cary Smith	Gordon Wadsworth
2017	Dylan Johnson	Carla Williams	Greg Golet	Gordon Wadsworth
2016	Dylan Johnson	Carla Williams	Jeff Clayton	Gordon Wadsworth
2015	Keck Baker	Brenda Simril	Roger Masse	Gordon Wadsworth
2014	Jeremiah Bishop	Brenda Simril	Roger Masse	Gordon Wadsworth
2013	Christian Tanguy	Cheryl Sornson	Gerry Pflug	Marland Whaley
2012	Christian Tanguy	Cheryl Sornson	Gerry Pflug	Ron Sanborn
2011	Christian Tanguy	Amanda Carey	Gerry Pflug	Doug Andrews
2010	Jeff Schalk	Amanda Carey	Gerry Pflug	Robert Herriman
2009	Jeff Schalk	Betsy Shogren		
2008	Jeff Schalk	Cheryl Sornson		
2007	Chris Eatough	Carey Lowery		
2006	Harlan Price	Hillary Harrison		

== See also ==
- Mohican MTB 100
- Lumberjack 100
- The Endurance 100
- Shenandoah 100
- Breckenridge 100
