= Chris Eatough =

American racing cyclist

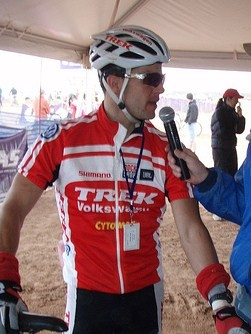

Personal information
- Full name: Christopher Eatough
- Born: 30 October 1974 (age 51) England
- Height: 5 ft 10 in (178 cm)
- Weight: 160 lb (73 kg)

Cycling career
- Sport: Cycling
- Current team: Trek-VW
- Discipline: MTB
- Role: Racer
- Rider type: Marathon

Chris Eatough (born 30 October 1974, England) is a British mountain bike racer (now retired) who was part of the Trek Racing Cooperative team. He is a six-time 24-hour solo World Cup champion and five-time 24-hour solo National Cup champion.

== Career ==
Chris Eatough played soccer at the college level at Clemson University while pursuing a degree in engineering. He became involved in mountain biking after graduation, and became a professional in 1999. He specializes in 24-hour, endurance and ultra-marathon events. He has won six 24-hour solo world championships and two 24-hour solo NORBA national championship. Trek Bicycle Corporation is his primary sponsor. He currently rides for the Trek Racing Cooperative Team, formerly the Trek VW team with Jeremiah Bishop, Travis Brown, Sue Haywood, Lea Davison and Ross Schnell. Eatough also coaches.

After retiring from professional racing in 2009, Chris was hired as the program manager for Bike Arlington. In that capacity, he led Arlington Virginia's efforts for the 2010 launch of Capital Bikeshare, the regional bicycle sharing program for the Washington, DC metropolitan area.

In 2014, Eatough became Howard County, Maryland's first Bike and Pedestrian Manager for the county's Department of Planning and Zoning, He lives in Elkridge.

== Documentary ==
Eatough was the subject of a 2007 documentary produced in the USA by Gripped Films and directed by Ken Bell and Jason Berry entitled 24Solo. It showed his 2006 season, specifically his success in 24-hour races. The film covers in lesser detail his private life and the success of his team.

== Palmarès ==
2003

- 1st, 24 Hours of Adrenalin world solo championship (4th consecutive)
- 1st, 24 Hour Solo NORBA national championship (1st win)
- 1st, Wilderness 101, Pennsylvania

2004

- 1st, 24 Hours of Adrenalin world solo championship (5th consecutive)
- 1st, 24 Hour Solo NORBA national championship (2nd consecutive)
- 1st, Wilderness 101, Pennsylvania

2005

- 1st, 24 Hours of Adrenalin world solo championship (6th consecutive)
- 1st, Wilderness 101, Pennsylvania
- 1st, Marathon NORBA National # 2, Arizona
- 2nd, Marathon NORBA National # 1, Texas

2006

- 1st, Lumberjack 100 (NUE Race), Michigan
- 2nd, Shenandoah 100 (NUE Race), Virginia
- 2nd, 24 Hours of Adrenalin world solo championship

2007

- 1st, 24 Hours of Moab, Utah
- 1st, 24 Hours of 9 Mile, 24 Hour Solo National Championship, Wisconsin
- 1st, BC Bike Race, British Columbia, Canada (with teammate Jeff Schalk)
- National Ultra Endurance Series Champion
- 1st, Cohutta 100 (NUE Race), Tennessee
- 1st, Mohican MTB 100 (NUE Race), Ohio
- 1st, Lumberjack 100 (NUE Race), Michigan
- 1st, Endurance 100 (NUE Race), Utah

2008

- 1st, 24 Hours of 9 Mile, 24 Hour Solo National Championship, Wisconsin
- 1st, Shenandoah 100 (NUE Race), Virginia
- 1st, Tahoe-Sierra 100 (NUE Race), California
- 2nd, Wilderness 101 (NUE Race), Pennsylvania
- 2nd, Mohican MTB 100 (NUE Race), Ohio
- 2nd, BC Bike Race, British Columbia, Canada (with teammate Jeff Schalk)
