= Endurance 100 =

Annual mountain bike race

The Endurance 100 was a hundred-mile (162 km) mountain bike race held annually in late August in Utah. The race was discontinued after the 2007 event.

== See also ==
- Wilderness 101 Mountain Bicycle Race
- Mohican MTB 100
- Lumberjack 100
- Shenandoah 100
- Breckenridge 100
