= Trans-Sylvania Mountain Bike Epic =

Mountain bicycle stage race

The Trans-Sylvania Mountain Bike Epic is a mountain bicycle stage race in Pennsylvania. The event is seven days in length and features the rocky, mountainous terrain of central Pennsylvania's multi-use trails.

== Race ==
Also known as:

TransSylvania Epic
Transylvania Epic
TSE
TSEpic

The name Trans-Sylvania is a reference to other mountain bike stage races such as TransRockies and TransAlp. The Trans-Sylvania Epic differs from these events mainly because it is based out of a central location whereas TransRockies and TransAlp are a continuous route between encampments and towns. The central location of the base camp relative to the course routes allows for minimal packing, transport, and travel for participants and staff. Also, compared to other mountain bike stage races, Trans-Sylvania's courses are designed to appeal to a broad spectrum of ability levels as well as catering to upper level professional racers.

The inaugural running of the event was May 30 − June, 2010 and its base camp location is the Seven Mountains Boy Scout Camp near State College, Pennsylvania. Courses featured areas In Rothrock State Forest, Bald Eagle State Forest, and Raystown Lake. The 2011 Trans-Sylvania Epic was held from May 29 to June 4, 2011. The base camp location was also the Seven Mountains Boy Scout Camp, and the stages were modified versions of the 2010 routes. In 2012, the third running started on May 27, and will finish on June 2. It features a short time trial prologue stage, and then 6 Cross country stages that range from a distance of 20 to 45 miles. The feature roads and gravel trails, as well as single and double track.

The number of riders has increased steadily every year, from around 50 in 2010 to 100 in 2011, and to 150 in 2012. The promoters hope to increase the attendance to 250 people within the next two years

Some notable competitors include Jeremiah Bishop, who won the first two years, 2006 world champion Sue Haywood, multi-time national cyclo-cross National Champion Tim Johnson, and mountain biking pioneer Keith Bontrager.

== Categories ==
The categories for racers at the Trans-Sylvania Epic include:

- Solo - Open Men
- Solo - Open Women
- Masters Men 40+
- Masters Men 50+ (added in 2011)
- Singlespeed Open, known as "Singlespeederific"
- Open Tandem (2010 only)
- Men's Duo
- Co-Ed Duo

Epic Team Category

Epic Teams are a unique feature of this race. They allow people to ride as hard as they want, as often as they want. Teams can have 2–5 members, all Epic Teams compete against each other. Only one person from each team must finish each day and only the fastest time from each team is counted for each stage. These times are combined for General Classification placement. Another feature of this category is that riders do not have to race every day. As long as one person crossed the line each day, the team is still in the running for GC

== Results ==
2010

Open Men
1. Jeremiah Bishop
2. Alex Grant
3. Brandon Draugelis
Open Women
1. Selene Yeager
2. Karen Potter
3. Rebecca Rush
"Singlespeederific"
1. Greg Martin
2. Douglas Jenne
3. Rich Dillen
Master Men
1. Alec Petro
2. Garth Prosser
3. Alex Hawkins

2011

Open Men
1. Jeremiah Bishop
2. Jason Sager
3. Kris Sneddon
Open Women
1. Amanda Carey
2. Selene Yeager
3. Vicki Barclay
"Singlespeederific"
1. Rich Straub
2. Morgan Miller
3. Rich Dillen
Master Men 40+
1. Garth Prosser
2. Rich Oneil
3. Bruce Stauffer
Master Men 50+
1. Scott Thomson
2. James Wilson
Duo
1. Team ERRACE: Andrew Caputo and Mark Hixon
2. Pisgah Area Cycling: Cissy Fowler and David Cook
Epic Team
1. The CO/VA Connection
2. Team Saratoga
