= Sue Haywood =

American mountain biker

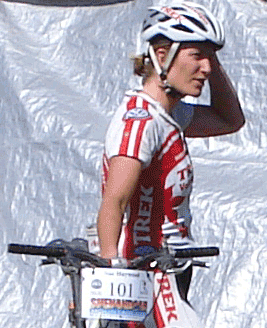
- Haywood in 2007

Personal information
- Full name: Susan Haywood
- Born: October 9, 1971 (age 55) United States

Cycling career
- Sport: Cycling
- Current team: Trek/VW
- Discipline: Mountain Bike Racer
- Role: Racer
- Rider type: Off Road

Sue Haywood (born October 9, 1971) is a retired professional mountain bike racer. She raced for team Trek Volkswagen along with notables Jeremiah Bishop, Travis Brown, Chris Eatough, Lea Davison and Ross Schnell.

Sue Haywood was awarded $318,647.14 in a civil case against USA Cycling for not being awarded a spot on the 2004 Olympic Team after a sketchy selection process.

== Major wins ==
- 2007
  - 1st Transrockies—Open Women (2-person team with Hillary Harrison)
  - 1st Shenandoah 100 - New course record
- 2006
  - 1st Solo World Championships by 24 Hours of Adrenalin
  - 1st Shenandoah 100
  - 1st NORBA National Short Track Championships
  - 1st NORBA National Super-D Championships
- 2005
  - 1st Overall, NORBA #2, Arizona
  - 1st, TT NORBA #2
- 2004
  - 1st, Chequamagon Fat Tire Festival
  - 1st, Great Wall Cycling Festival, Beijing, China
  - 1st, Pan American Championships
- 2003
  - 1st overall, NORBA Short Track Championship
  - 1st NORBA NCS STXC, Big Bear, California
  - 1st Stage 1, Subaru Nova Desert Classic
  - 1st Stage 2, Subaru Nova Desert Classic
- 2002
  - 1st Team, 24 Hours of Moab, Moab, Utah
- 2001
  - US Short Track Champion 1st, UCI World Cup, Time Trial, Durango, Colorado
  - 1st, 24 Hours of Moab, Utah
