= BC Bike Race =

Race details
- Date: May–June
- Region: Canada, British Columbia
- Nickname: BCBR
- Discipline: Mountain Bike Race
- Type: Seven Stage Mountain Bike Race
- Organiser: BC Bike Race

History
- First edition: 2007
- Editions: 20

The BC Bike Race or BCBR the "Ultimate Singletrack Experience" was founded in 2007 by Dean Payne and Andreas Hestler. It is an annual event that celebrates the culture of mountain biking in British Columbia, and around the world. Bringing together often as much as 36 different countries and the passionate appreciation of hand-crafted trails, built for riding pleasure. The BC Bike Race is a seven-day mountain bike stage race held in British Columbia, Canada, traditionally held in early July. Typically six hundred racers ride an average of 2.5hrs per day, for 30 - 50 kilometres on single track race routes that are 75-90% singletrack, with some gravel and road sections.

== Route ==
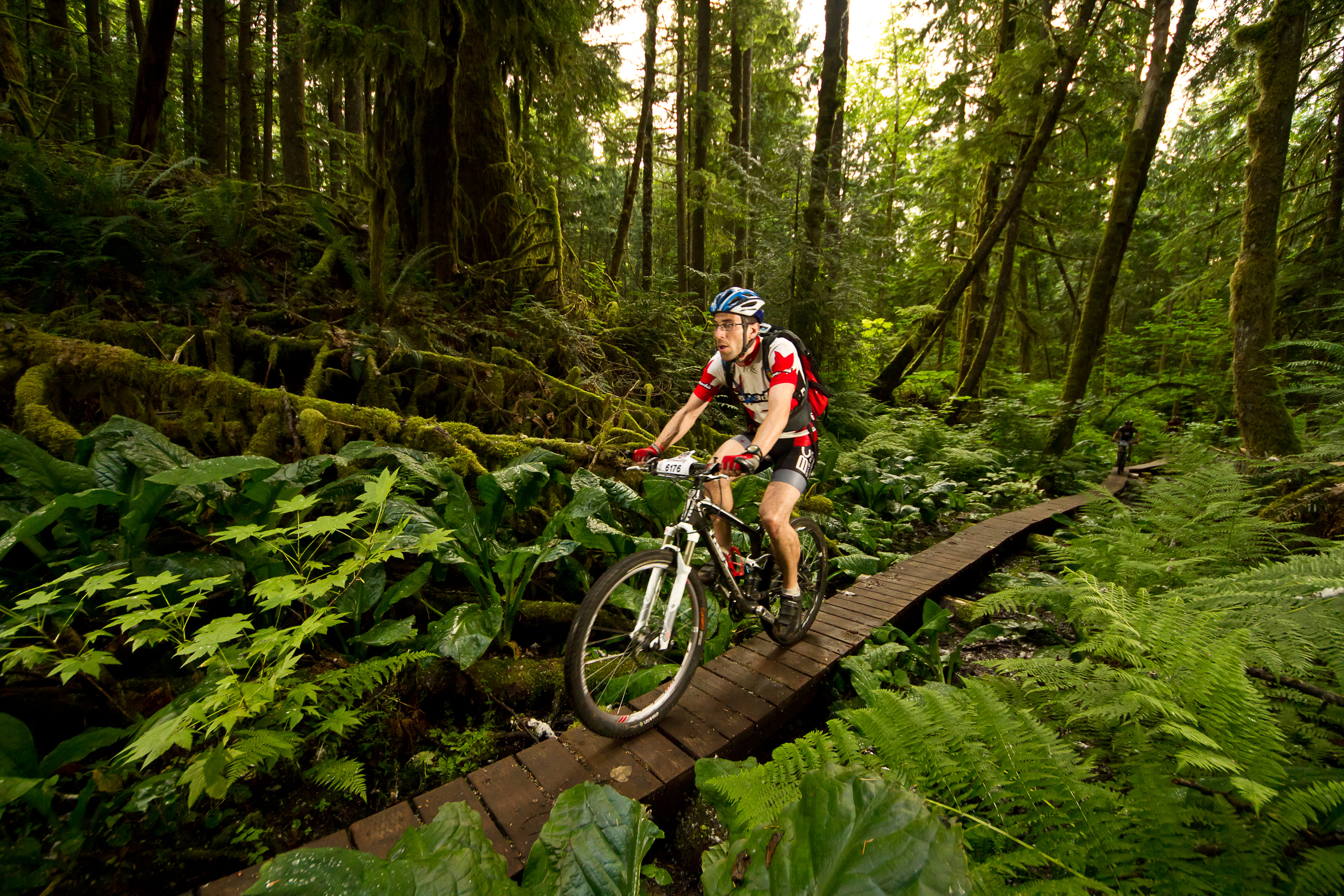
BC Bike race 2011

Each year, the BC Bike Race route changes, but it always includes parts of British Columbia Singletrack growing inventory.

From the beginning the route has involved Vancouver Island, with communities such as: Cumberland, Campbell River, the Cowichan Valley and Nanaimo, the Sunshine Coast, and the Sea to Sky Corridor, including North Vancouver, Squamish, and Whistler.

In the beginning in 2007, the event was predominantly a gravel event with long point to points, that finished with some singletrack. As the years passed and the volume of trails increased, the BC Bike Race kept in step with the evolution of the bike industry and the riders choices. Within three years the "Ultimate Singletrack Experience" was born and the focus was on the highest quality singletrack available anywhere in the world, the BC advantage.

The route for 2019 will once again include a prologue in North Vancouver. Racers then will experience Cowichan Valley, Cumberland (for two stages), Powell River, Sechelt (for two stages), and the final stage in Squamish.

The 2021-22 editions were held in the fall and in the Okanagan, in the Interior of British Columbia. The response to the pandemic forced creative scheduling and large scale movement. Some locations selected were Penticton, Naramata, Kelowna, Apex, Salmon Arm, Cold Stream and Silver Star. Eventually in 2023 the BCBR moved back to the Coast.

The 2026 Edition, and 20th Celebration of the BC Bike Race will take place entirely on Vancouver Island, as with the 23, 24, and 25th - the route will reverse format and start North in the partner town of Cumberland, take in Campbell River, Nanaimo and head south finish in the scenic Cowichan Valley.

== Categories ==
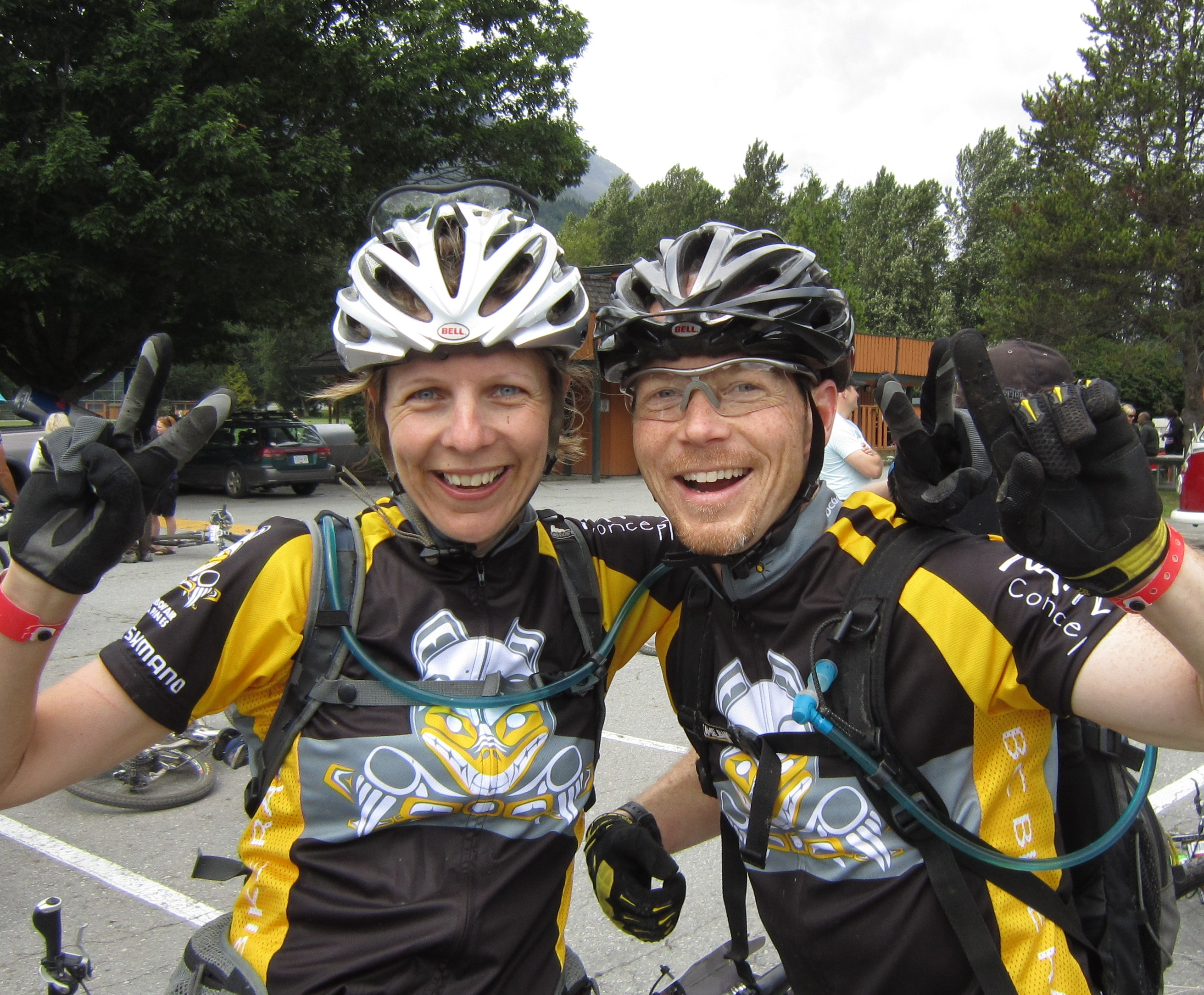
Michael Brown and Veronica Jarlehag winners of the mixed open team of two at the BC bike race 2011

In 2007 and 2008, racers had to compete as part of a team. Now, BC Bike Race offers a Solo option; Solo categories are Open Men, Men 40+, Men 50+ Open Women, Women 40+, and Women 50+. Teams of two categories include: Open Men, Open Women, Open Mixed, Veterans 80+ (combined age of both riders is over eighty), and Veterans 100+ (combined age over one hundred).

== Guest racers ==
The race has been known to extend invitations to certain riders to compete as a celebrity guest on certain stages. Past guests include Trevor Linden (Ex-Captain of the Vancouver Canucks). Some other athletes have stayed and completed the BC Bike Race in its entirety: Brian Lopes, Mark Weir, Jesse Melamed, Wade Simmons, and Georgia Gould, all hard core mountain bikers that have also rubbed shoulders through the singletrack with other notables like Tour de France veteran Udo Bolts, and Olympic Snowboarder Alex Deibold. 2026 will be the 20th anniversary.

== Results ==
=== Solo racers ===
Year	First Place Male	Time	First Place Female	Time
2026	TBD		TBD	
2025	Sean Fincham	10:01:10	Sandra Walters	12:25:45
2024	Sean Fincham	10:41:31	Maghalie Rochette	13:02:51
2023	Andrew L'Esperance	10:45:47	Katarina Nash	13:07:44
2022	Peter Disera	13:33:30	Sandra Walters	16:26:00
2021	Andrew L'Esperance	8:44:48	Laurie Arseneault	10:34:07
2020	Pandemic - No Race		Pandemic - No Race	
2019	Felix Burke	15:43:46	Katarina Nash	18:39:46
2018	Geoff Kabush	15:18:22	Katarina Nash	18:10:05
2017	Geoff Kabush	n/a	Katarina Nash	n/a
2016	Cory Wallace	15:48:00	Kelli Emmett	19:31:00
2015	Tristan Uhl	16:29:58	Katerina Nash	19:18:41
2014	Kris Sneddon	15:13:54	Lea Davison	18:27:48
2013	Kris Sneddon	15:40:16	Wendy Simms	19:34:58
2012	Neal Kindree	16:15:52	Wendy Simms	20:25:12
2011	Chris Sheppard	16:34:54	Jennifer Schulz	22:33:52
2010	Chis Sheppard	18:17:32	Melanie McQuaid	22:22:18
2009	Seamus McGrath and Chris Sheppard	18:27:31	Katerina Nash and Catharine Pendrel	21:49:42
2008	Kris Sneddon and Barry Wicks	25:58:24	Kelli Emmett and Sara Bresnick-Zoochi	32:08:16
2007	Chris Eatough and Jeff Shalk	25:02:50	Cynthia Young and Michelle Newton	35:19:19

=== Team racers ===
2008 Results 400 starters

Open Men

- 1st Place - 25:58:24 - Kris Sneddon and Barry Wicks
- 2nd Place - 26:19:17 - Chris Eatough and Jeff Schalk
- 3rd Place - 26:40:33 - Tim Bennett and Adrian Jackson

Open Women

- 1st Place - 32:08:16 - Sara Bresnick-Zocchi and Kelli Emmett
- 2nd Place - 35:40:23 - Kristenn Magnusson and Lisa Ludwig
- 3rd Place - 36:07:32 - Katie Lindquist and Amy Harris

2007 Results 210 starters

Open Men

- 1st Place - 25:02:50 - Chris Eatough and Jeff Schalk
- 2nd Place - 25:45:03 - Andreas Hestler and Kevin Calhoun
- 3rd Place - 26:28:52 - Manuel Prado and Jason First

Open Women

- 1st Place - 35:19:19 - Cynthia Young and Michelle Newton
- 2nd Place - 36:31:03 - Jennifer Keefer and Jen Sawrenko
- 3rd Place - 37:52:26 - Emma Smith and Sarah O'Byrne

== See also ==
- Absa Cape Epic
- La Ruta de los Conquistadores
- Trans Alp Challenge
- Transrockies
