= Mohican MTB 100 =

Mountain bike race in Ohio, United States

Race details
- Date: Early June
- Region: Mohican State Park, Ohio
- Discipline: Mountain Bike
- Type: 100 Mile Ultra Endurance
- Race director: Ryan O'Dell

History
- First edition: 2004
- Editions: 12

The Mohican MTB 100 is an ultra-endurance 100 mile (161 km) mountain bike race held annually in early June in North Central Ohio. The course contains over 11,000 feet of climbing on single-track, double-track and dirt roads. This course is very scenic, almost entirely tree covered and more than 90% on dirt. This course is only one lap and is almost entirely in the 5,000 acre (20 km²) Mohican State Park. This course has been designed in part by a veteran, experienced endurance racer keeping in mind all things loved and dreaded about other courses. The race has been one of the stops of the National Ultra Endurance Series since 2006. In both the 2006 and 2005 races, problems with course markings were reported by multiple racers.

== Results ==
| Year | Male Winner | Time | Female Winner | Time |
|---|---|---|---|---|
| 2020 | Michael Spain | 6:12 | Shana Cowell | 8:42 |
| 2019 | Dylan Johnson | 6:49 | Chase Edwards | 8:30 |
| 2018 | Jermiah Bishop | 6:57 | Chase Edwards | 9:18 |
| 2017 | Jermiah Bishop | 6:35 | Carla Williams | 7:56 |
| 2016 | Dylan Johnson | 6:57 | Linda Shin | 8:59 |
| 2015 | Chris Tanguy | 7:10 | Linda Shin | 9:00 |
| 2014 | Chris Tanguy | 6:56 | Brenda Simril | 8:49 |
| 2013 | Mike Simonson | 7:15 | Cheryl Sornsen | 8:00 |
| 2012 | Chris Tanguy | 6:38 | Amanda Carey | 7:42 |
| 2011 | Jeff Schalk | 6:45 | Cheryl Sornsen | 8:36 |
| 2010 | Jeff Schalk | 7:33 | Amanda Carey | 9:15 |
| 2009 | Jeremiah Bishop | 6:50 | Betsy Shogren | 8:35 |
| 2008 | Jeff Schalk | 7:09 | Betsy Shogren | 9:08 |
| 2007 | Chris Eatough | 7:08 | Carey Lowery | 9:16 |
| 2006 | Harlan Price | 8:42 | Tricia Stevenson | 10:37 |
| 2005 | Jeremiah Bishop | 8:05 | unknown | unknown |
| 2004 | Garth Prosser | 10:07 | unknown | unknown |

=== 2006 ===
81 racers started, 61 finished. Longest finish time was 16½ hours.

=== 2005 ===
31 racers started, 25 finished.

== See also ==
- Wilderness 101 Mountain Bicycle Race
- Lumberjack 100
- Shenandoah 100
- Breckenridge 100
