= Wild Oak Trail =

Hiking trail in Virginia, United States

Coordinates: 38.395016°N 79.258041°W

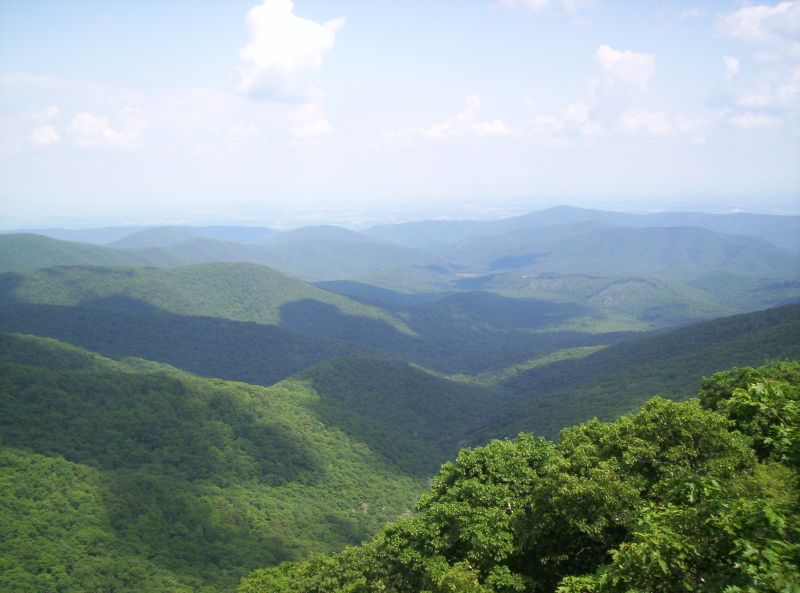
- View from Little Bald Knob on the Wild Oak Trail
- Length: 25.6 mi (41.2 km)
- Location: George Washington National Forest, Virginia, United States
- Use: Hiking, Mountain Biking, Horseback Riding
- Highest point: Little Bald Knob, 4,351 ft (1,326 m)
- Lowest point: North River Gap, 1,600 ft (490 m)
- Difficulty: Strenuous
- Season: Spring, Summer
- Sights: Appalachian Mountains

The Wild Oak Trail is a 27.0-mile (43.5 km) National Recreation Trail located in the Ridge-and-Valley Appalachians in Central Virginia, United States. It is part of George Washington National Forest. The trail is a loop, and begins at the headwaters of the North River, and traverses up to several ridge tops. Due to the trail's difficulty (circumnavigating the trail requires 7,850 feet of total ascent) and length, it sees little traffic.

== History ==
The Wild Oak Trail was designated a National Recreation Trail by the Secretary of Agriculture in 1979. Much of the land surrounding the trail and the North River was cleared for farming, which continued through the 1930s. It was during this time that portions of the trail was cleared by the Civilian Conservation Corps to help in providing access for fighting Forest Fires.

Camp Todd, which the trail passes by after a crossing of the North River, was used as a herdsman's cabin and a Fire Guard station.

== Animals and Plants ==
There are a variety of birds, reptiles and mammals in the area. Deer, Black Bear, rattlesnakes, fox, grouse and bobcats may be encountered by users of the trail.

There have been more than forty species of trees and thirty wildflowers identified along the Wild Oak Trail.

== Activities ==
The trail sees a variety of user activity, including hiking and backpacking. To complete the entire loop, various guides suggest devoting a day to each of the trail's three sections.

The trail is well marked and easy to follow. Challenges for the hiker include steep ascents and descents, and few water supply points. There are backcountry camp spots along the trail.

Hikers should be aware that the area is popular with hunters in the fall and should exercise necessary caution.

Also, the trail and overlooks tend to be overgrown with vegetation late in summer, so an early Spring or early Fall hike is recommended.

Mountain Biking is also a popular activity on the Wild Oak Trail. Part of the Shenandoah 100 Ultra-Endurance race uses the trail.

The Virginia Happy Trails Running Club hold a couple "unofficial" trail running events a year on the Wild Oak. Participants may run the loop multiple times.

Horseback Riders also utilize the trail, while using Camp Todd to stay overnight.

In addition, the primitive North River Campground is located two miles (3 km) from the trail.

== Image gallery ==
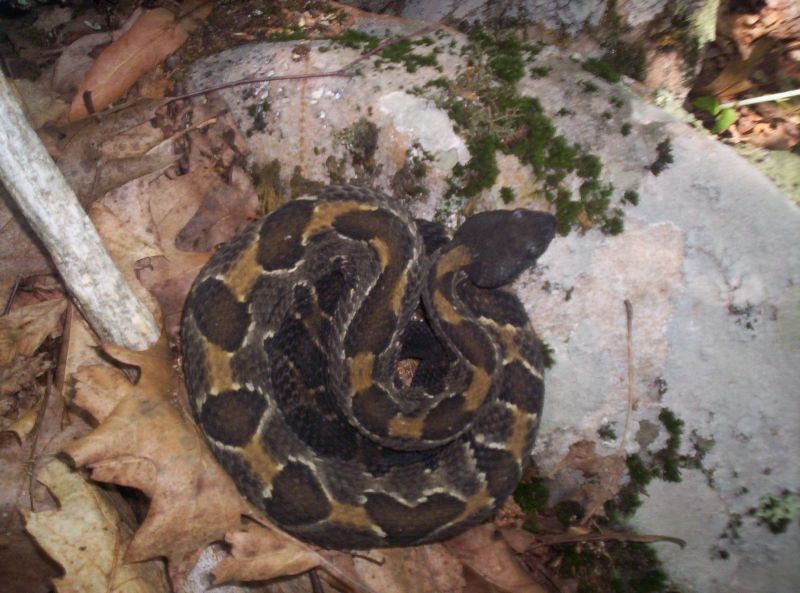
An example of the wildlife found on the trail

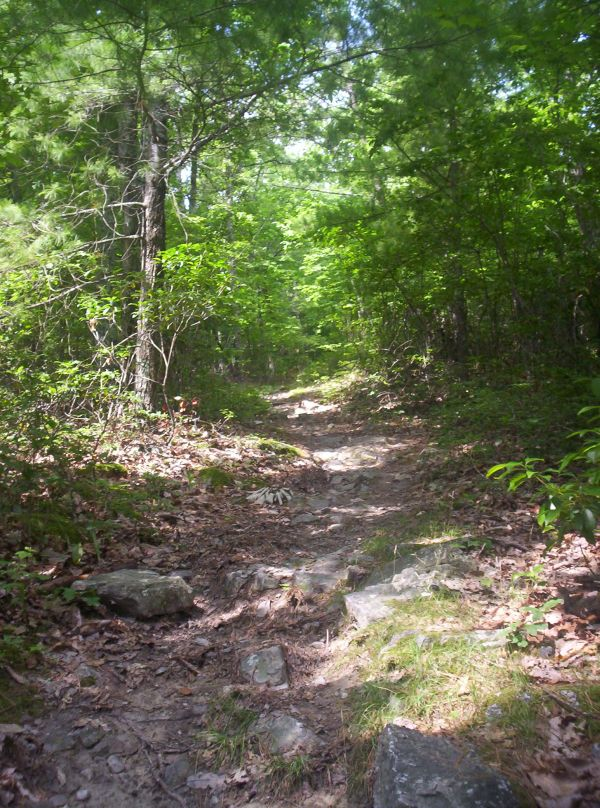
The trail often leads uphill

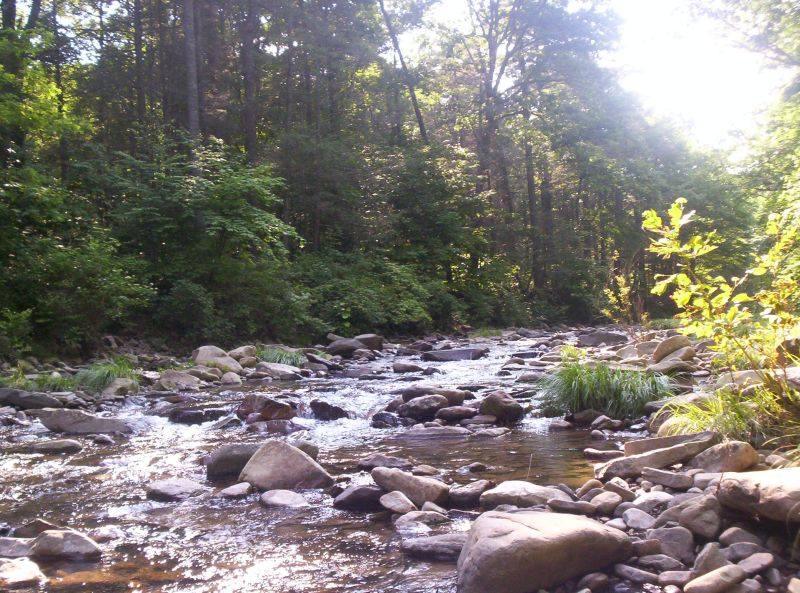
The North River crossing, near Camp Todd
