= Lumberjack 100 =

Mountain bike race in Michigan, United States

Race details
- Date: 3rd Saturday in June
- Region: Wellston, Michigan
- Nickname: L100, LJ100
- Discipline: Mountain Bike
- Type: 100 Mile Ultra Endurance (National Ultra Endurance Series)
- Organiser: Kisscross Events

History
- First edition: 2005
- Editions: 12

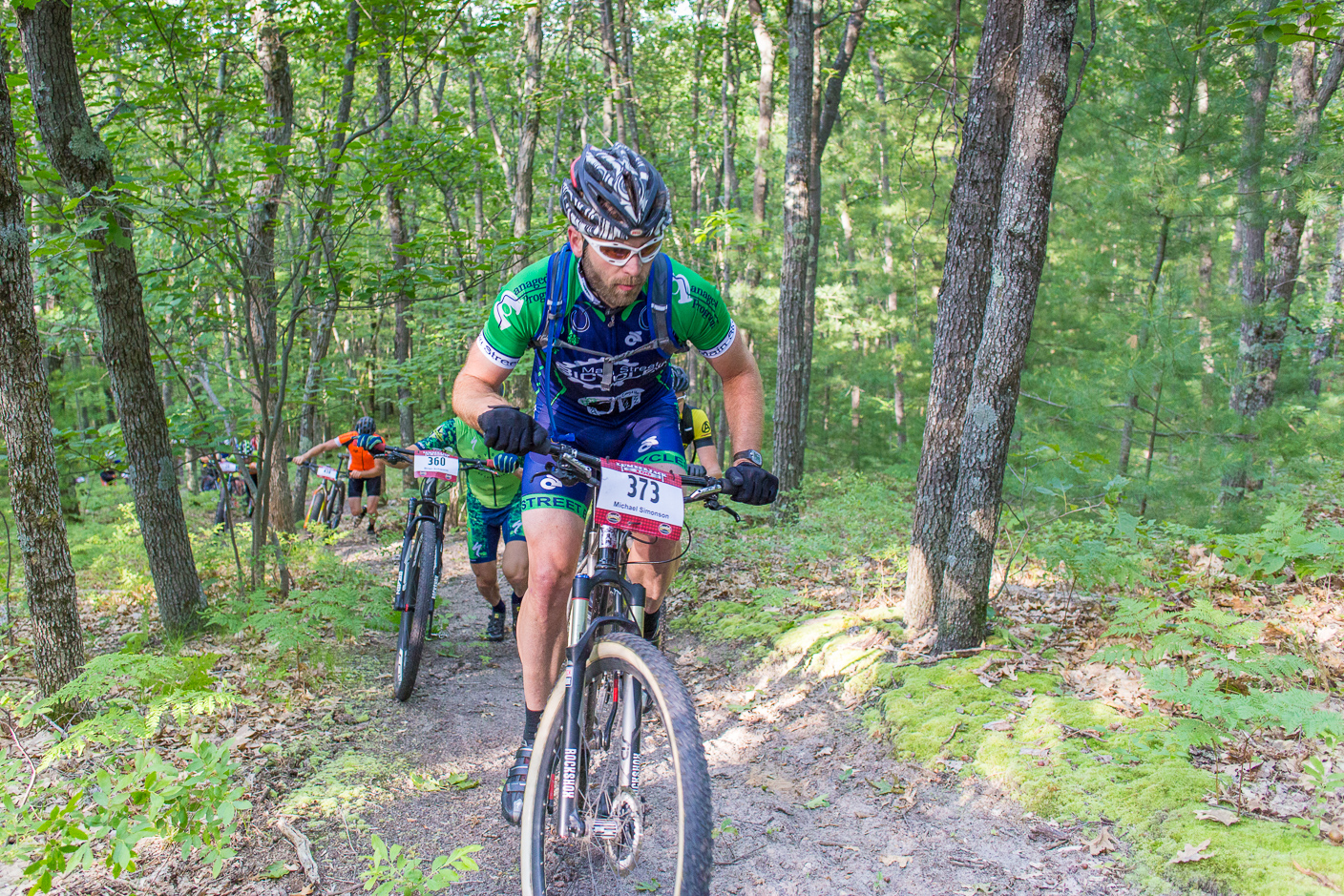
Lumberjack 100 climb

The Lumberjack 100 is an ultra-endurance mountain bike race held the 3rd Saturday in June at Michigan's Big M Cross Country Ski and Mountain Bike Trail in the Manistee National Forest. The race is a 100-mile mountain bike marathon and is part of the National Ultra Endurance Series. The race course consists of three 33.33 mile laps in the Udell Hills area and crosses the North Country National Scenic Trail twice per lap. The course contains over 8,000 feet of climbing and is 80% single track. Due to venue limitations, only 450 racers are allowed to participate.

== Results ==
Summary Results Table

Year	Starters	Finishers	Male Winner	Time	Female Winner	Time
2026			Jorden Wakeley	6:27:32	Sheila Sherwood	8:11:16
2025			David Brower	7:12:32	Dori Leib	9:34:52
2024			Christian Tanguy	6:27:39	Erin O'Mara	7:29:09
2023	424	362	Jorden Wakeley	6:23:23	Maria Doering	7:48:40
2022	344	319	Jorden Wakeley	6:31:18	Julie Momber	7:17:59
2021	334	283	Sean Kickbush	6:52:06	Julie Medema	8:09:39
2020	Cancelled due to COVID-19 pandemic					
2019	344	310	Dylan Johnson	6:42:53	Chase Edwards	7:48:15
2018	363		Dylan Johnson	6:41:25	Carla Williams	7:23:47
2017	345		Dylan Johnson	6:35:07	Chase Edwards	7:42:37
2016	413		Brian Schworm	6:30:10	Kaitlyn Patterson	7:27:27
2015	450		Brian Schworm	6:27:39	Mari Chandler	7:59:03
2014		273	Christian Tanguy	6:37:06	Danielle Musto	8:02:35
2013			Barry Wicks	6:42:25	Alice Pennington	7:51:15
2012			Barry Wicks	6:27:19	Amanda Carey	7:42:35
2011		327	Christian Tanguy	6:30:25	Amanda Carey	7:40:38
2010			Jeff Schalk	6:33:49	Cheryl Sornson	8:19:51
2009			Jeff Schalk	6:48:06	Betsy Shogren	8:20:11
2008			Jeff Schalk	7:07:47	Cheryl Sornson	8:45:10
2007			Chris Eatough	6:49:15	Danielle Musto	8:47:09
2006			Chris Eatough	7:09:06	Karen Mason	8:34:27
2005		96	Scott Quiring	7:27:38	Kim Luks	8:53:24

== Details ==
=== 2016 ===
In the 2016 edition of the race, Kaitlyn Patterson (Team OAM) had a thirty-second lead after the first lap; by the final lap Patterson had extended the lead to more than 20 minutes over runner up Mari Chandler (Team Adventure). In the men's event, Brian Schworm (Think Green - VO2) finished four minutes ahead of runner up Alex Vanias (Team OAM), and five minutes ahead of Bradley White (UnitedHealthcare Pro Cycling). 413 racers started the event.

=== 2015 ===
450 racers lined up for the 2015 edition of the Founders Lumberjack 100, including two-time Olympian Tinker Juarez. The race marked the fifth event in the NUE Series. In unseasonably cold conditions, Brian Schworm (Green's Toyota) and Mari Chandler (Dart Nuun / Tecnu Racing) won the men's and women's open races, respectively.

=== 2014 ===
2014 marked the 10th anniversary of the Lumberjack 100. To mark the occasion, the direction of the race course was reversed. The Women's Open winner Danielle Musto led from the start line, whereas the Men's Open winner, Christian Tanguy, broke away from the competition eight miles before the finish line.

=== 2013 ===
Following a slow spring thaw, the 2013 event featured a dry, sandy course and temperature highs in the mid-70s (degrees F). The men's open race was decided in a sprint between the three podium winners, Barry Wicks, Michael Simonson, and Christian Tanguy. In contrast, over half an hour separated the women's first and second place contenders, Alice Pennington and Danielle Musto.

=== 2012 ===
The 2012 edition of Lumberjack 100 was a sold-out event held under unusually hot, dry, and sandy conditions. Barry Wicks and Amanda Carey won the Men's and Women's Open divisions.

=== 2011 ===
In 2011, a full field contended, ending with the winners finishing in record times; Women's Open winner, Amanda Carey; Men's Open winner, Christian Tanguy.

=== 2010 ===
The 2010 Founders Lumberjack 100 is in the books. No crazy storms or heat to write about this year. The week leading up to the race included a few thunderstorms and that made for some great soil conditions this year. In this edition of the race, the course was changed from four 25-mile laps to three 33-mile laps, creating a number of challenges with 2-way traffic. Compared to previous years, a larger percentage of participants completed the event. Many racers commented that the 3 lap race was mentally easier, but physically harder due to the use of some killer single track climbs never used in the race before.

=== 2009 ===
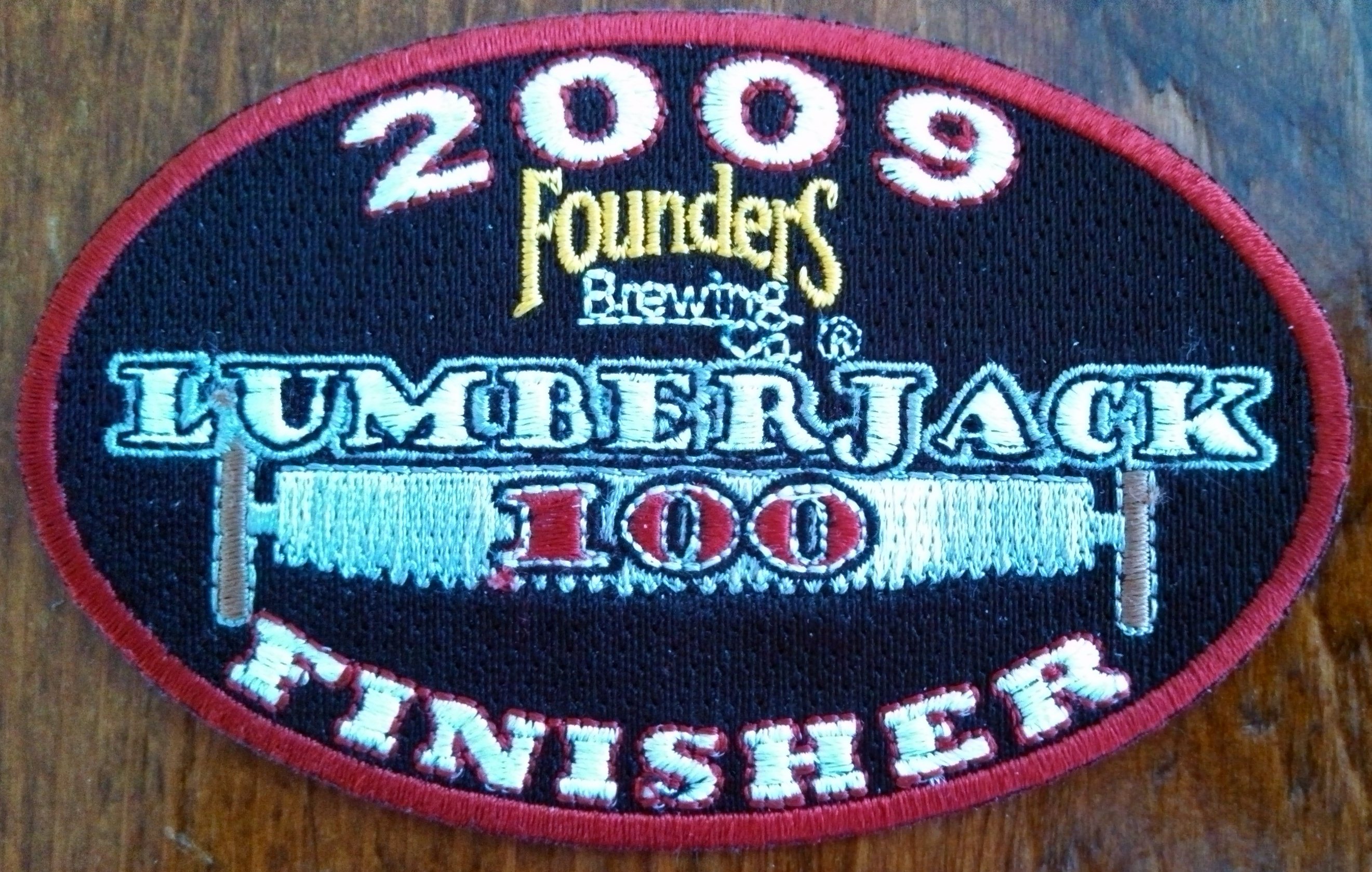
This image is a photograph of the patch (badge) awarded to all finishers of the 2009 Founder's Brewing Company Lumberjack 100 mountain bike (bicycle) race (Michigan, USA).

Jeff Schalk (Trek) and Betsy Shogren claimed wins at this year's running of The Lumberjack 100 in Wellston, Michigan. The contest to capture the coveted Hatchet Trophies on the third stop of this year's NUE Series proved to be very different for the two. While Shogren rode in the lead from start to finish, Schalk was forced to do battle up to the final mile.

Race favorites, Betsy Shogren (Cannondale), Karen Potter (mtbmind.com) and Danielle Musto (Kenda/Tomac/Hayes) jumped ahead of the women's field early on and established themselves in that order and only minutes apart after the first 25-mile lap. The top three women's positions did not change for the remainder of the race. Shogren claimed victory with a time of 8:20, a new women's course record, while Potter chased close behind to finish in 8:26. Danielle Musto, her knee bloodied from a near race ending crash on lap 2 was able to finish in third place 8:46. In the men's open class Jeff Schalk (Trek), Chris Eatough (Trek), Mike Simonson (Gary Fischer 29er) and Christian Tanguy (Team Fraser) formed a lead group in the first 10 miles and pulled well away from the rest of the field. With Schalk at the front the four stayed together through 50 miles until rising temperature, humidity and Schalk's blistering pace setting took their toll on Simonson, who lost contact with the group. Little changed for the remaining three over the next 25 miles. Going into the final lap Eatough was the next to lose contact with Schalk and Tanguy. With the finish line less than a lap away and the selection down to just two, Tanguy attacked Schalk repeatedly, pulling well ahead of the Trek rider at one point. But in the end it was Schalk who had the better legs, attacking Tanguy in the last mile and claiming a hard-fought victory with a time of 6:48:06. Tanguy finished close behind at 6:48:36. Rounding out the top three was Eatough, who stopped the clock at 6:57. Simonson would cross the line for fourth at 7:17, followed close behind by Derek Graham (Bissel). The single speed class was dominated from start to finish by Gerry Pflug (Speedgoat/Spk/Salsa). Gerry road to a new Lumberjack single speed record (7:17:33) and also managed to cross the line only seconds behind Mike Simonson for fifth place overall. Rounding out the men's single speed podium was Roger Masse (Trek) at 7:56 and Joe Kedrowski (Founders Ales) at 8:04.

Records set in each class! Men's · 1st Place- Jeff Schalk- 6:48:06 · 2nd Place- Christian Tanguy- 6:48:36 · 3rd Place- Chris Eatough- 6:57:18 Women's

· 1st Place- Betsy Shogren- 8:20:11 · 2nd Place- Karen Potter- 8:26:05 · 3rd Place- Danielle Musto- 8:46:32 Master's · 1st Place- Jack Kline- 8:28:01 · 2nd Place- David Kelnberger- 8:49:10 · 3rd Place- Tim Curtis- 8:52:58 Single Speed · 1st Place- Gerry Pflug- 7:17:33 · 2nd Place- Roger Masse- 7:56:54 · 3rd Place- Joe Kedrowski- 8:04:02

=== 2008 ===
Not to be outdone by the first two rain soaked races in the National Ultra Endurance (NUE) series, stop number three at the Lumberjack 100 in Michigan saw 11 inches of rain and 80 mph winds the night before the race in the worst storm the area had seen in 30 years. The winds and rain forced a marathon clean-up of debris and trees from the trails, but by the time Saturday morning broke all that was left were a few welcome log hops and three muddy sections that grew as the 250 racers passed through them. Fortunately due to the nature of the mostly sandy course, the majority of the trail was well drained and the amount of standing water was limited to only those three short, but treacherous sections. Undeterred by the conditions, Jeff Schalk (Trek/VW) maintained his control over the series lead with another close win by only a minute over Oregonian, Evan Plews (Scott/ Capitol Subaru). So far each of Schalk's three wins in the series have been by two minutes or less after 100 miles of racing. A group of eight racers made the early separation through most of the first 25-mile lap, but an attack from Harlan Price (IFRacing.org/ Industry Nine) on the first eight-mile section of the second lap whittled the group down to five racers; Schalk, Plews, Chris Eatough (Trek/VW), Christian Tanguy (American Cycle and Fitness) and Price. Price repeated the same attack on lap three and thinned the group down to himself, Schalk and Plews, but his early efforts took their toll towards the end of the lap and Plews and Schalk moved up the road without the Independent Fabrication rider. Schalk led most of the fourth lap and found all of his attacks answered by a tenacious Plews, who was still contending despite a flat early in lap two. It wasn't until about five miles to go that Schalk was able to get a gap and hold it to the finish despite some cramping. Filling the last two positions in the top five were Eatough in fourth and Tanguy in fifth. In the women's field Cheryl Sornson (Trek/VW) took home her first win of the NUE series with a full day riding in front of the rest of her competitors. Sornson was off the front from the beginning using her improved 2008 form to stay away on course that favored a rider capable of staying on the gas and riding smart lines through the narrow and curvaceous singletrack. Her win put her in the overall lead for the series. Seventeen minutes back from the Trek/VW rider was Karen Potter (MTB-Mind.com) from Massachusetts and rolling across the line in third was last year's winner and local Daniel Musto of the Kenda-Titus-Hayes team. The singlespeed division saw a new face on the top of the podium. Ronald Sanborn (McLain Cycle and Fitness) found himself in the fortunate position of first by only a minute over second place John (Fuzzy) Myline (Sho-Air, rock and Road/ Niner) with a time of 7:57:19. Third position was occupied by Nate Versluis (Founders Ale / Alger Racing) and not far behind was the series singlespeed leader Dejay Birtch (Niner Bikes).

Men's

- 1st place - Jeff Schalk - 7:07:47
- 2nd place - Evan Plews - 7:08:50
- 3rd place - Harlan Price - 7:11:36

Women's

- 1st place - Cheryl Sornson - 8:45:10
- 2nd place - Karen Potter - 9:02:23
- 3rd place - Danielle Musto - 9:43:19

=== 2007 ===
High winds and thunderstorms took a toll on the trail and volunteers leading up to race day. The course was so covered with limbs and blow downs that a crew of 25 men and women had to clear the entire 25 mile loop a week in advance of the race. Leaving the destruction would have made for a very unsafe and miserable experience for the racers.

Come race day, National Ultra Endurance (NUE) Race Series competitors Chris Eatough (Trek / VW) and Danielle Musto (Slingshot) took wins in the men's and women's category of the Lumberjack 100, round #3 of the NUE series, held Saturday, June 16. Michigan racer, Michael Simonson (Bell's Brewery / Quiring Cycles) led the first 40 miles with Chris Eatough (Trek / VW) close on his heels. By the 50 mile mark, Eatough had passed Simonson and built a two-minute lead. Eatough went on to finish the race at a blistering time of 6:49:15 with Simonson coming in at 7:01. Third place was taken by Michigan racer Christian Tanguy (American Cycle and Fitness), who suffered a bad crash that broke his helmet and gave him some good scrapes across his forehead. Tanguy came in at 7:03:18 while Pennsylvanian Harlan Price (Independent Fabrication) came in fourth at 7:07:05 Danielle Musto (Slingshot) lead the women's field for more than 75 miles of the race, building an 18-minute gap by the halfway point and finishing first in 8:47:09. Erika Tieszen (Giant, Smith, Dakine, Niterider) came in second at 9:22:37 and Michelle Schneider finished third at 9:31:25.

Men's

- 1st place - Chris Eatough - 6:49:15
- 2nd place - Michael Simonson - 7:01:00
- 3rd place - Christian Tanguy - 7:03:18

Women's

- 1st place - Danielle Musto - 8:47:09
- 2nd place - Erika Tieszen - 9:22:37
- 3rd place - Michelle Schneider - 9:31:25

=== 2006 ===
The hot/humid weather dominated the 2006 Lumberjack 100 with temperatures in the mid to upper 80's and even higher humidity. Of the 162 starters, 62 were able to make the full 100 miles - only 38% of all racers! Typical symptoms of non-finishers (beside fatigue) were nausea, chills and for some, hallucinations. One rider reported feeling chills on his 3rd lap, hearing people come up behind him that were not there and a strong desire to stop and fall asleep in the woods, but afraid that he would freeze to death if he did! His pit crew did not let him go out on his 4th lap...

Men's

- 1st place - Chris Eatough - 7:09:06
- 2nd place - Harlan Price - 7:42:02
- 3rd place - Russ Tiles - 7:52:23

Women's

- 1st place - Karen Mason - 8:34:27
- 2nd place - Trish Stevenson - 8:41:15
- 3rd place - Danielle Musto - 9:10:20 (on a single speed bike)

=== 2005 ===
Perfect weather for racing, overcast and temperatures in the mid to low 70's welcomed the inaugural event.

Men's

- 1st place - Scott Quiring - 7:27:38 (on a 29"er bike)
- 2nd place - Bernie Grysen - 7:35:07
- 3rd place - Russ Tiles - 7:36:47

Women's

- 1st place - Kim Luks - 8:53:24 (on a single speed bike)
- 2nd place - Danielle Musto - 9:09:21
- 3rd place - Jen Conine - 11:06:46 (on a single speed bike)

== See also ==
- Wilderness 101 Mountain Bicycle Race
- Mohican MTB 100
- Shenandoah 100
- Breckenridge 100
