= John Stamstad =

American cyclist

Cycling career
- Sport: Cycling
- Current team: Retired
- Role: Rider

John Stamstad is a member of the Mountain Bike Hall of Fame. He was famous for his domination of long-distance mountain bike races. He entered his first long-distance road bike race in 1985. The 547-mile (880 km) non-stop race was across Missouri from St. Louis to Kansas City and back. In 1991 he switched from road events to ultra-marathon mountain bike events when he entered the Montezuma's Revenge, a 24-hour race in Colorado.

Stamstad has moved on to distance running in recent years, serving as a sponsored "ambassador" for Patagonia, the outdoor clothing and equipment manufacturer. He has spent his time running self-supported across some of the world's most desolate terrain. He ran the 200-mile (320 km) John Muir Trail in 2005, unsupported. On a 100-mile (160 km) desert run, on the White Rim Road in Canyonlands National Park, Stamstad ran with a modified baby jogger full of water .

== Major results and records ==
- 1992 First crossing of the Australian continent by bicycle-The Australian Bicycle Challenge, a 3,500-mile (5,600 km) off-road race through the remote Outback.
- Iditasport Race (170 mile) - Alaska -1993, 1994, 1995, 1996
- Iditasport Race (350 mile) - Alaska - 1997, 1998, 1999, 2000
- Ultra-Marathon Cycling Association 24 Hour Off-Road World Record - 352 miles (566 km)
- 1996 First solo entry and first solo finish of the 24 Hours of Canaan (He entered as a team using four variations of his name) and bested more than half of the teams. He also remained undefeated in the solo class at 24 Hours of Canaan (and then Snowshoe) until his retirement in 2001.
- 1999 pioneered unsupported Divide Racing on the Great Divide Mountain Bike Route - 2,500 miles (4,000 km) and 200,000 feet (61,000 m) of climbing. His individual time trial of 18 days and 5 hours stood for 5 years until it was eclipsed in the inaugural Great Divide Race.

== See also ==
- Wilderness 101
- Marathon Mountain Bike Races
