= Pia Sundstedt =

Finnish cyclist

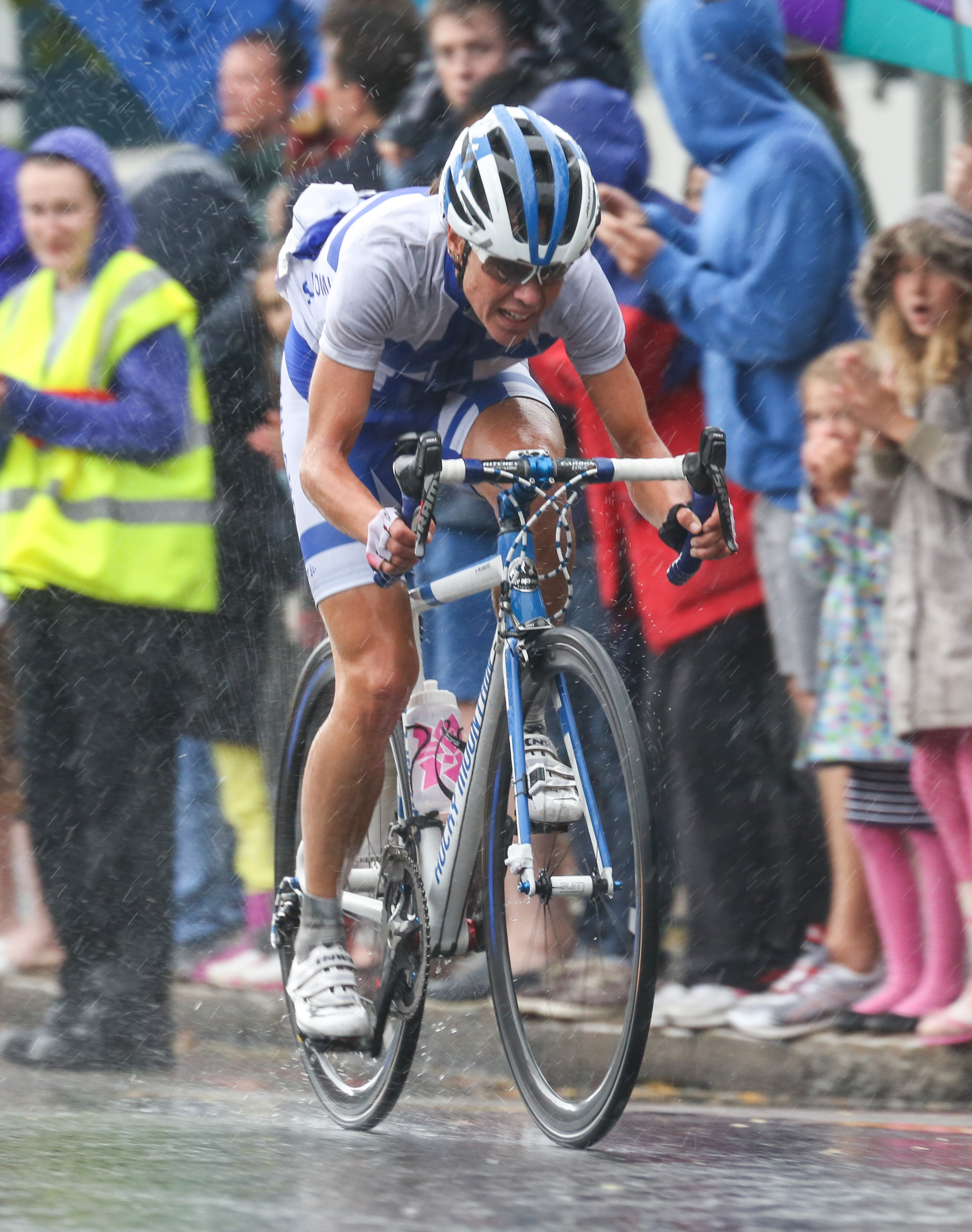
- Sundstedt competing in the 2012 Olympics road race in London

Personal information
- Full name: Pia Ann-Katrine Sundstedt
- Born: 2 May 1975 (age 51) Kokkola, Finland
- Height: 5 ft 6 in (168 cm)
- Weight: 115 lb (52 kg)

Cycling career
- Sport: Cycling
- Current team: Retired
- Disciplines: Road and mountain
- Role: Rider

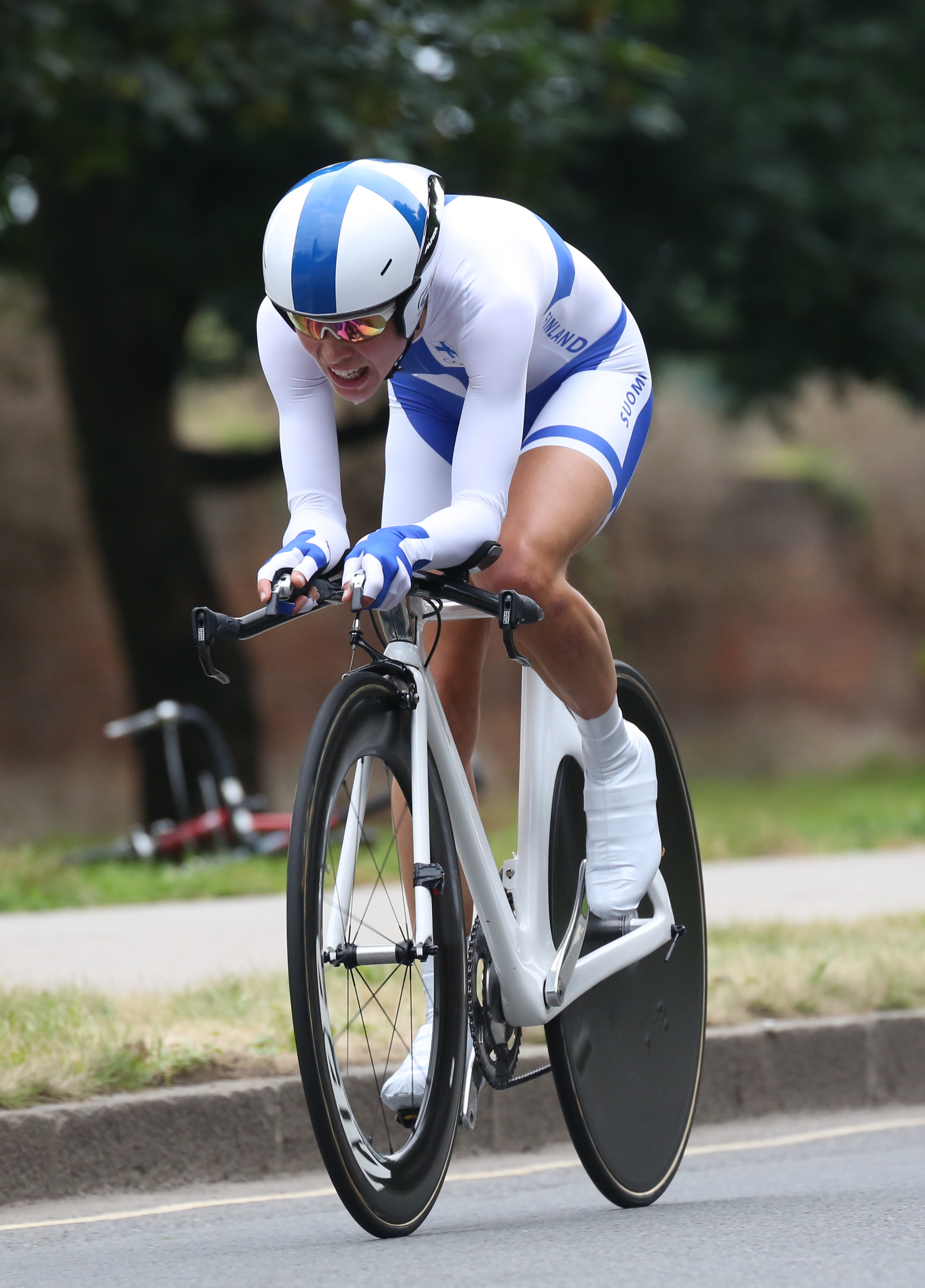
Sundstedt competing in the 2012 Olympics time trial in London

Pia Ann-Katrine Sundstedt (born 2 May 1975 in Kokkola, Finland) is a professional former cyclist, who competes in road bicycle racing and mountain bike racing, as well as cross-country skiing events. Sundstedt competed in the Summer Olympics for Finland. Having started in 2006, Sundstedt competes for Rocky Mountain/Business Objects mountain bike racing team.

In 2000, Sundstedt won the Montreal World Cup event and competed for Finland at the 2000 Summer Olympics. In recent years, the four-time national Finnish national road cycling champion focused her attentions toward marathon mountain bike races and cross country skiing events. Her efforts paid off in 2006 when Sundstedt captured two World Cup events and the overall individual points championship in the UCI World Cup for Cross country Marathon (XCM).

In 2008, Sundstedt came 1st in the Women's Category at the Absa Cape Epic with teammate Alison Sydor.

She competed at the 2012 Summer Olympics in the Women's road race, finishing 20th and in the Women's time trial finishing 11th.

== Major results ==
1997

- Road Bicycle Racing
  - 1st, Finnish Road Race Champion
  - 1st overall and 1 stage win, Giro del Trentino (ITA)

1998

- Road Bicycle Racing
  - 2nd, La Flèche Wallonne Féminine (World Cup)
  - 1st overall and 1 stage win, Giro Toscana (ITA)
  - Stage win, Giro d'Italia Femminile

1999

- Road Bicycle Racing
  - 6th, La Flèche Wallonne Féminine (World Cup)
  - 3rd overall, Giro del Trentino (ITA)
  - Stage win, Giro d'Italia Femminile

2000

- Road Bicycle Racing
  - 1st, Coupe du Monde Cycliste Féminine de Montréal (Montreal World Cup)
  - 2nd, La Flèche Wallonne Féminine (World Cup)
  - 21st, Summer Olympics Women's Road Race

2001

- Road Bicycle Racing
  - 1st, Finnish Road Race Champion
  - 1st overall, GP Féminine International du Québec, Quebec (CAN)

2002

- Road Bicycle Racing
  - 1st, Finnish Road Race Champion

2005

- Mountain Bike Racing
  - 1st, European Mountain Bike Marathon Championship
  - 5th, UCI Mountain Bike Marathon World Championship
- Road Bicycle Racing
  - 1st, Finnish Road Race Champion

2006

- Mountain Bike Racing
  - 1st, UCI World Cup XCM Overall
    - 1st, UCI World Cup, Val Thorens (FRA)
    - 1st, UCI World Cup, Mont Saint Anne (CAN)
    - 2nd, UCI World Cup, Naoussa (GER)
    - 3rd, UCI World Cup, Villabassa (ITA)
  - 1st, Raid Ardenne Bleue, Verviers (BEL)
  - 1st, Finnish National Championships XCM, Lappeenranta (FIN)
  - 1st, Birkebeinerrittet (NOR)
  - 1st, Bike Festival Willingen, Willingen (GER)
  - 2nd, European Championships UEC, Chies d'Alpago (ITA)
  - 5th, UCI Mountain Bike Marathon World Championships, Oisans (FRA)
  - 5th, Sea Otter Classic, Monterey, California (USA)
- Cross-country skiing / Ski marathon
  - 1st, Pustertal Ski Marathon Classic, (ITA)
  - 2nd, Hotzenwald Ski Marathon Classic, (GER)
  - 3rd, Pustertal Ski Marathon Skating, (ITA)
  - 7th, FIS Marathon Cup, (FRA)
  - 3rd, Fäboda Loppet, (FIN)
  - 1st, Kokkola Town Champion, (FIN)
  - 1st, Bernau Skating Jet, (GER)
  - 1st, Trace Vosgienne, (GER)

2007

- Mountain Bike Racing
  - 1st, UCI World Cup XCM Overall
  - 1st, Birkebeinerrittet (NOR)
  - 3rd, XCM (GER)

2008

- Mountain Bike Racing
  - 1st, UCI World Cup XCM Overall
  - 1st, Birkebeinerrittet (NOR)
  - 1st Absa Cape Epic Women's Category

2010

- Mountain Bike Racing
  - 1st, Birkebeinerrittet (NOR)

2011

- Mountain Bike Racing
  - 1st, UCI World Cup XCM Overall
    - 1st, XCM (GER)
  - 1st, Birkebeinerrittet, Rena-Lillehammer (NOR)
  - 1st, CykelVasan, Sälen-Mora (SWE)
  - 1st, Trans Germany, (GER)
  - 4th, XCM World Championships, Montello (ITA/CM)
- Road Bicycle Racing
  - 1st, Finnish Road Race Champion
  - 1st, Finnish Time Trial Champion
  - 3rd, Golan I, (SYR/1.2)
  - 3rd, Golan II, (SYR/1.2)
  - 5th, Chrono des Nations, (FRA/1.1)

2012

- Mountain Bike Racing
  - 1st, Birkebeinerrittet, Rena-Lillehammer (NOR)
