= Jeff Schalk =

American racing cyclist (born 1974)

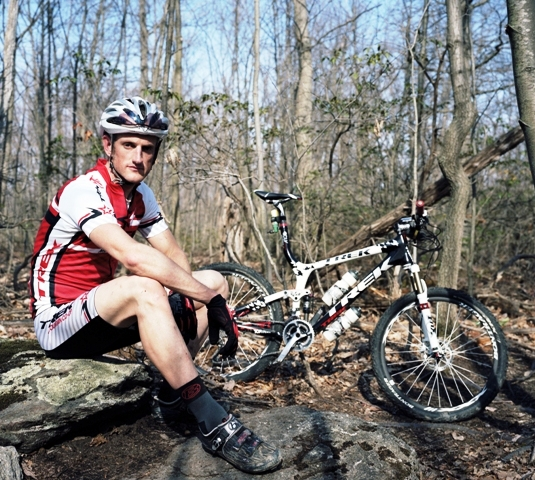
- Jeff Schalk in the Frederick Municipal Forest in 2011

Personal information
- Full name: Jeffrey Schalk
- Born: February 6, 1974 (age 52) United States
- Height: 1.85 m (6 ft 1 in)
- Weight: 72.6 kg (160 lb; 11.43 st)

Cycling career
- Sport: Cycling
- Current team: Trek Mountain Co-Op
- Discipline: Mountain Bike
- Role: Rider
- Rider type: Ultra Endurance

Professional teams
- 2006-2008: Trek-Volkswagen East
- 2009-2011: Trek Mountain Co-Op

Jeff Schalk (born February 6, 1974, in Santa Cruz, California) is a retired professional mountain bike racer. His racing career began in 2006 when he took hiatus from a career in structural engineering, practicing in San Francisco, California. He moved to Washington, D.C., to pursue racing full-time with the Trek Volkswagen East Coast factory team. Schalk's major career breakthrough occurred in 2007 when he won the Shenandoah 100, establishing himself as a primary name in the domestic MTB endurance scene. When the Trek and Volkswagen partnership dissolved at the end of 2008, the Trek Bicycle Corporation continued its support of Jeff by directly signing him to full sponsorship. After his breakthrough in 2007, he moved to Frederick, Maryland, and began to specialize in ultra-endurance racing events, namely 100-mile mountain bike races. Over the course of his 6 year career, he amassed 17 wins in 100-mile MTB racing, winning the National Ultra Endurance Series for three consecutive years. Schalk's sponsors for the majority of his career included: Trek Bicycle Corporation, Bontrager, Fox Racing Shox, Shimano, PowerBar, Dumonde Tech Racing Oils, and ESI Grips. All of his racing victories came aboard Trek's flagship cross country race bike at the time, the Trek Top Fuel.

He retired from racing at the end of the 2011 season, returning to his career in structural engineering. He lives in Fort Collins, Colorado, and works for JVA Consulting Engineers.

== Major Achievements / Results ==
=== 2011 ===
- 1st, Mohican MTB 100 (NUE Race), Ohio - course record
- 1st, Breckenridge 100 (NUE Race), Colorado - course record
- 1st, Wilderness 101 (NUE Race), Pennsylvania - course record
- 1st, Pierre's Hole 100 (NUE Race), Wyoming - course record
- 2nd, Lumberjack 100 (NUE Race), Michigan
- 2nd, Syllamo's Revenge 125k (NUE Race), Arkansas
- 3rd, Cohutta 100 (NUE Race), Tennessee

=== 2010 ===
- National Ultra Endurance Series Champion
- 1st, Cohutta 100 (NUE Race), Tennessee
- 1st, Mohican MTB 100 (NUE Race), Ohio
- 1st, Lumberjack 100 (NUE Race), Michigan
- 1st, Wilderness 101 (NUE Race), Pennsylvania
- 1st, Fool's Gold 100 (NUE Race), Georgia
- 1st, Stoopid 50, Pennsylvania
- 2nd, Shenandoah 100 (NUE Race), Virginia
- 3rd, Breckenridge 100 (NUE Race), Colorado

=== 2009 ===
- National Ultra Endurance Series Champion
- 1st, Cohutta 100 (NUE Race), Tennessee - course record
- 1st, Lumberjack 100 (NUE Race), Michigan
- 1st, Wilderness 101 (NUE Race), Pennsylvania
- 1st, Stoopid 50, Pennsylvania
- 2nd, Breckenridge 100 (NUE Race), Colorado
- 3rd, Mohican MTB 100 (NUE Race), Ohio
- 3rd, Shenandoah 100 (NUE Race), Virginia

=== 2008 ===
- National Ultra Endurance Series Champion
- 1st, Cohutta 100 (NUE Race), Tennessee
- 1st, Mohican MTB 100 (NUE Race), Ohio
- 1st, Lumberjack 100 (NUE Race), Michigan
- 1st, Wilderness 101 (NUE Race), Pennsylvania
- 2nd, BC Bike Race, British Columbia, Canada (with teammate Chris Eatough)
- 3rd, Shenandoah 100 (NUE Race), Virginia

=== 2007 ===
- 1st, Shenandoah 100 (NUE Race), Virginia
- 1st, BC Bike Race, British Columbia, Canada (with teammate Chris Eatough)

=== 2006 ===
- 3rd, Shenandoah 100 (NUE Race), Virginia
