= Montezuma's Revenge (bicycle race) =

- The Montezuma's Revenge Logo

Race details
- Date: August
- Region: Colorado, United States
- Type: Mountain Bike Race

History
- First edition: 1986
- Editions: 20
- Final edition: 2006
- First winner: Sam Orez
- Most wins: Male: Rishi Grewal, 3 times Female: Monique Merrill, 2 times

The Montezuma's Revenge was a 24-hour ultra-endurance mountain bike wilderness race held in Colorado each August from 1986 until 2006. Competitors were required to climb a 14,272-foot (4,350 m) mountain-Gray's Peak. The course varied from year to year but was always extremely demanding. The winner was determined by who covers the most distance in the 24-hour period. Current course records:

- Female Jari Kirkland in 2004 - 122.33 miles (196.87 km) - 25,926 feet (7,902 m) climbed
- Male Josh Tostado in 2005 - 156 miles (251 km) covered - 32,350 feet (9,860 m) climbed

== Results ==
Year	Male Winner	Distance & Elevation	Female Winner	Distance & Elevation
2006	Ethan Passant	149 miles (240 km) & 31,303'	Cat Morrison	105 miles (169 km) & 19,328'
2005	Josh Tostado	156 miles (251 km) - 32,350'	Becs Hodgetts	117.40 mi (188.94 km) - 22,691'
2004	Josh Tostado	140 miles (230 km) - 30,895'	Jari Kirkland	122.33 miles (196.87 km) - 25,926'
2003	Thane Wright		Monique Merrill	
2002	Rishi Grewal		Colleen Ihnken	
2001	Rishi Grewal		Michelle Grainger	
2000	Thane Wright		Monique Merrill	
1999	Rishi Grewal			
1998	David Pickett-Heaps		Angie Carlevato	
1997	Joey Klein		Colleen Seyers	
1996	John Stamstad		Kathy Summers	
1995	Joey Klein			
1994	Thane Wright		Heather Bussy	
1993	Charles Hayes		Amy Maclean	
1992	Don Drogsvold			
1991	Don Drogsvold & John Stamstad tied		Nelson Corcoran	
1990	Dale Atkins		Micki Thomas	
1989	Dan Johnson			
1988	Bob Forney			
1987	Dan Johnson			
1986	Sam Orez			
