= Birkebeinerrittet =

Annual Norwegian mountain bike race

Birkebeinerrittet (lit. The Birkebeiner cycling race) is a long-distance mountain bike cycling race held annually in Norway. It is the world's largest mountain bike race in number of contestants. In 2009, 17,164 riders signed up, and 15,140 cyclists completed the race. In 2023 the 30th edition was held.

== The race ==
The race starts in Rena and ends at Håkons Hall in Lillehammer. Birkebeinerrittet is 84km long along fire roads, with some paved and some single/dual-track segments.

The race has been held since 1993 and commemorates a trip made by the Birkebeiner loyalists to save the heir to the Norwegian throne, Håkon Håkonsson, in 1206. All participants carry a backpack weighing at least 3.5 kg, symbolizing the weight of the then one-year-old heir.

== Past winners ==
=== Men ===
| Year | Name | Club/Nation | Time |
|---|---|---|---|
| 2022 | Ole Hem | Norway | 2:37:08 |
| 2021 | Eskil Evensen-Lie | Norway | 2:37:51 |
| 2019 | Eskil Evensen-Lie | Norway | 2:34:20 |
| 2018 | Erik Resell | Norway | 2:32:54 |
| 2017 | Erik Resell | Norway | 2:28:21 |
| 2016 | Åsmund Løvik | Norway | |
| 2015 | Carl Fredrik Hagen | Norway | |
| 2014 | Fredrik Wilmann | Norway | 02.33.18 |
| 2013 | Fredrik Ericsson | Sweden | 02.41.17 |
| 2012 | Lars Ragnar Manengen | Norway | 02.43.24 |
| 2011 | Stian Remme | Norway | 02.54.45 |
| 2010 | Hannes Genze | Germany | 02.57.04 |
| 2009 | Andreas Kugler | Switzerland | 03.02.05 |
| 2008 | Anders Hovdenes | Norway | 02.40.50 |
| 2007 | Massimo De Bertolis | Italy | 02.52.29 |
| 2006 | Lars Petter Nordhaug | Norway | 02.43.08 |
| 2005 | Thomas Frischknecht | Switzerland | 03.52.01 |

=== Women ===
| Year | Name | Club/Nation | Time |
|---|---|---|---|
| 2014 | Borghild Løvset | Norway | 03.05.04 |
| 2013 | Borghild Løvset | Norway | 03.12.38 |
| 2012 | Pia Sundstedt | Finland | 03.06.42 |
| 2011 | Pia Sundstedt | Finland | 03.08.26 |
| 2010 | Pia Sundstedt | Finland | 03.19.45 |
| 2009 | Gunn-Rita Dahle Flesjå | Norway | 03.27.02 |
| 2008 | Pia Sundstedt | Finland | 03.09.06 |
| 2007 | Pia Sundstedt | Finland | 03.24.43 |
| 2006 | Pia Sundstedt | Finland | 03.08.32 |
| 2005 | Gunn-Rita Dahle Flesjå | Norway | 04.05.18 |

== See also ==
- Cross-country cycling
- Marathon mountain bike races
