= North River (South Fork Shenandoah River tributary) =

River in Shenandoah Valley of Virginia, United States

Coordinates: 38°21′10.9″N 78°56′43″W

The North River is a 55.3-mile-long (89.0 km) river in the mountains and Shenandoah Valley of northern Virginia, the United States. It joins the South River at Port Republic to form the South Fork Shenandoah River.

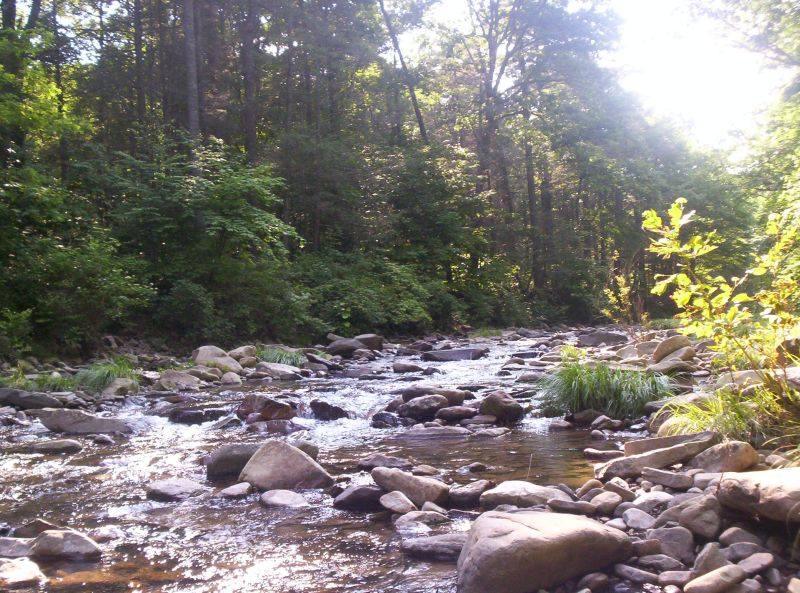
The North River, as seen from the Wild Oak Trail

The river rises at 4,000 feet (1,200 m) above sea level in western Augusta County, below Dyers Knob on Shenandoah Mountain along the Virginia-West Virginia border. From the man-made Elkhorn Lake it flows south and then east through the George Washington National Forest. The river breaks out of the Allegheny Mountains at North River Gap and flows into the broad Valley of Virginia. The river passes through the town of Bridgewater and flows southeast, joining the South River at Port Republic. The Middle River, a major tributary, joins the North River just west of the town of Grottoes, four miles above the juncture with the South River.

Other towns along the river include Mount Solon, Stokesville, Sangersville, Natural Chimneys, Mount Crawford, and the village of North River.

The river is popular among canoeists, rafters and inner tubers. At one point during the 19th century barges shipped goods upstream via a canal/lock system.

Typical wildlife of the North River includes the great blue heron, wood duck, Canada goose, belted kingfisher, Baltimore oriole, painted turtle, common snapping turtle, largemouth bass, sun perch, catfish, eastern cottontail rabbit, white-tailed deer, raccoon, opossum, brown bats, freshwater clams, mink, tiger swallowtail and ebony jewelwing.

Typical plant life of the North River includes the cardinal flower, joe-pye weed, purple monkeyflower, great blue lobelia, bulrush, yellow iris, American sycamore, cottonwood, box-elder, silver maple, Virginia bluebells, and spring beauty.

== See also ==
- List of rivers of Virginia
