= Yak Attack =

High–altitude mountain bike race in Nepal

Race details
- Date: May - June
- Region: Nepal
- Local name: Yak Attack
- Discipline: Mountain Biking
- Type: Stage race
- Organiser: MTB World Wide
- Web site: www.mtb-worldwide.com/the-yak-attack/

History
- First edition: 2007
- Most wins: Cory Wallace (CAN) 5 Wins
- Most recent: Khushiman Gharti (NEP)

Yak Attack is an annual high-altitude, long-distance mountain bike race. The race has been known to be non profit. It takes place in Nepal, and is described as "the highest, toughest, mountain-bike race in the world". The eighth annual race took place in 2014.

Nowadays, the Yak Attack is part of a three-part world challenge.

== Past Winners ==
Year	First	Second	Third
2016	Cory Wallace	Thinus Redelinghuys	Peter Butt
2017	Cory Wallace	Ajay Pandit Chhetri	Narayan Gopal Maharjan
2018	Cory Wallace	Roan Tamang	Okesh Bajracharya
2019	Cory Wallace	Roan Tamang	Rhys Verner
2022	Cory Wallace	Suraj Rana Magar	Laxman Malla
2023	Laxman Malla	Suraj Rana Magar	Achyut Krishna Kharel

Results since 2025:

2025: Total riders: 21. 6 nationalities including Nepali. Timing of best rider (Khusiman Gharti): 16:26:01

First	Second	Third	Category
Khushiman Gharti	Achyut Krishna Kharel	Laxman Malla	Open Male
Usha Khanal	Megan Ann	-	Open Female
Justin Holle	Ganesh Gurung	Anil Maharjan	Master 40+
Harka Lama	Amit Matityahu	Tom Roger Beeck	Master 50+
Rafaelle Verzella	Ang Jangbu Paldorje	-	Grand Master 60+

== See also ==
- Annapurna Circuit
- Mountain biking
