= Breckenridge 100 =

Mountain bike race in Colorado, United States

Race details
- Date: Mid July
- Region: Colorado, United States
- Nickname: Breck 100
- Discipline: Mountain Bike
- Type: 100 Mile Ultra Endruance
- Organiser: Warriors Cycling

History
- First edition: 2005
- Editions: 14

The Breckenridge 100 is an ultra-endurance mountain bike race held annually in mid July in Breckenridge, Colorado.

At the same time the Breck 100 is being held, the organization offer three others options; solo 68 miles, solo 32 miles and a team relay. Initially this race offered just two distance classes, 100 miles (160 km) and 100 km (62 mi) and no awards were presented to those doing the shorter version, it simply offered an easier alternative for those riders not ready to race the full 100 miles. The race was part of the National Ultra Endurance Series until 2012 and will be again in 2017.

The sprawling course is nestled between three ski resorts and features a distinct cloverleaf format of three loops that each begin and finish in Carter Park, adjacent to historic downtown Breckenridge. The race crosses the Continental Divide of the Americas three times, once at Wheeler Pass at an elevation over 12,400 ft and twice at Boreas Pass at an elevation of 11,492 ft. The course climbs a total of 13,719 feet, and includes backcountry trails, roads, double track, bike paths, and high mountain stream crossings.

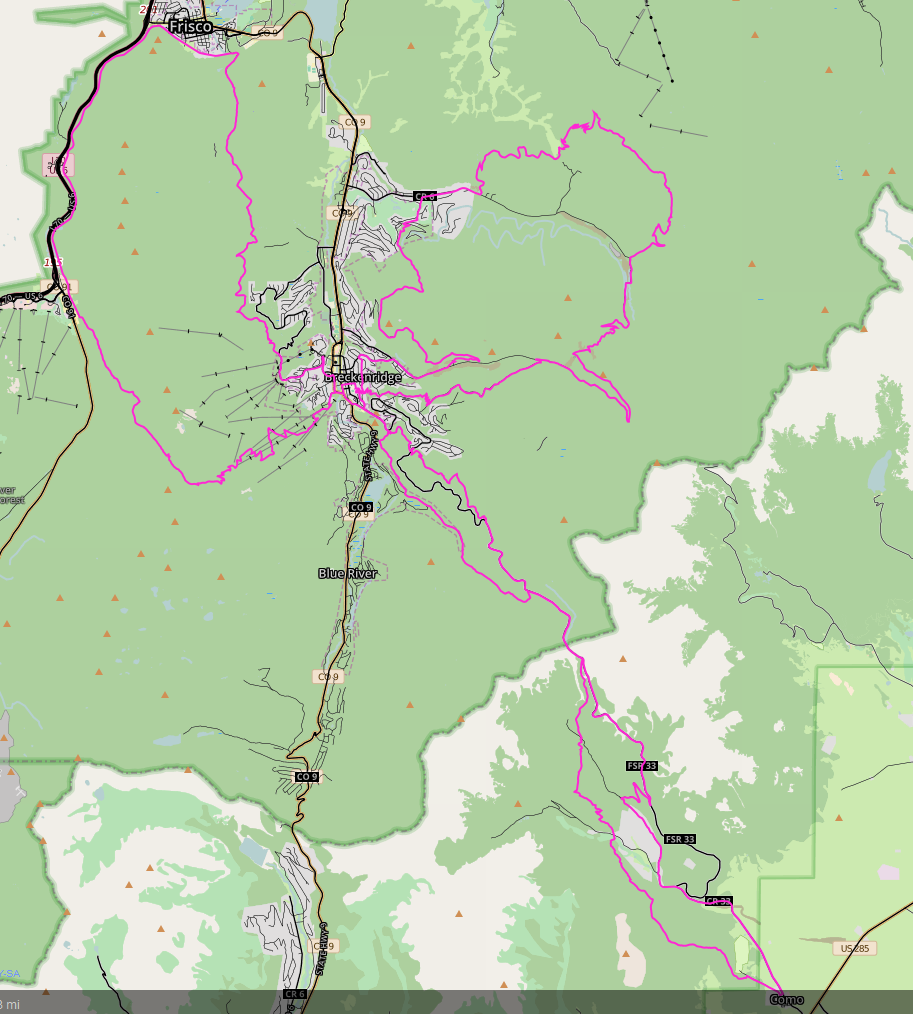
The 2010 Breck Course displayed over Open Street Map Data

== Results ==
Year	Male Winner	Time	Female Winner	Time
2018	Taylor Shelden	7:40	Larissa Connors	9:31
2017	Sam Sweetser	9:04	Larissa Connors	10:10
2016	Bryan Dillon	8:29	Sari Anderson	10:22
2015	Zach Guy	8:39	Laureen Coffett	12:39
2014	Josh Tostado	8:46	Elizabeth Sampey	10:54
2013	Ben Sonntag	8:23	Sonya Looney	9:48
2012	Michael Weiss	8:14	Amanda Carey	10:09
2011	Jeff Schalk	8:08	Jari Kirkland	10:31
2010	Josh Tostado	8:23	Jari Kirkland	9:59
2009	Josh Tostado	8:33	Eszter Horanyi	10:07
2008	Josh Tostado	8:14	Kelley Cullen	10:08
2007	Josh Tostado	9:05	Monique Merrill	10:49
2006	Josh Tostado	9:03	Karen Masson	10:27
2005	Josh Tostado	9:13	Rebecca Hodgetts	11:44

== See also ==
- Wilderness 101 Mountain Bicycle Race
- Mohican MTB 100
- Shenandoah 100
- Lumberjack 100
