= Brazil Ride =

The Brazil Ride MTB Stage Race is a seven bicycle race in Chapada Diamantina area of Brazil. The Brazil Ride premiered in November 2010 Each day of the competition provide an average of 80 to 130 kilometers (50 to 81 mi) of mountain bike terrain.

The stage is the Chapada Diamantina, part of a protected area. The National Park has 152 thousand hectares and average altitude ranges between 800 and 1,200 meters (2,600 and 3,900 ft) above sea level, with peaks of up to 2,000 meters (6,600 ft). The region features several fountains, waterfalls, crystal lakes, red-colored rivers and a diverse fauna and flora.

Brazil Ride presents different categories: open, mixed, ladies and master. Athletes have to be at least 40 years old.
