= Andreas Hestler =

Canadian cyclist

Personal information
- Born: May 12, 1970 (age 56) Victoria, British Columbia, Canada
- Height: 5 ft 9 in (175 cm)
- Weight: 180 lb (82 kg)

Cycling career
- Sport: Cycling
- Discipline: Racing
- Role: Rider

Professional team
- ?: Rocky Mountain Bicycles

Andreas Hestler (born May 12, 1970, in Victoria, British Columbia, Canada) is a Canadian professional racing cyclist. Hestler finished 31st in the Men's Mountain Bike Race at the 1996 Summer Olympics. Hestler currently rides for Rocky Mountain Bicycles and is co-founder of the BC Bike Race.

== Major results ==
2-Time Canadian Champion, 3-Time National Series Champion:

1996
31st, Olympic Men's Mountain Bike Race - XC
2003
2nd, Trans Rockies Challenge
2004
1st, Trans Rockies Challenge
2005
1st, Trans Rockies Challenge
2nd, Trans Alp Challenge (teammate Alison Sydor)
2006
1st, Trans Rockies Challenge
