= Harlan Price =

American racing cyclist (born 1976)

Personal information
- Full name: Harlan Price
- Nickname: Boxed Bee
- Born: January 25, 1976 (age 50) United States
- Height: 5 ft 9 in (175 cm)

Cycling career
- Sport: Cycling
- Current team: TakeAim Cycling
- Discipline: Mountain Bike Skills Instructor
- Role: Owner

Major wins
- NUE Series Overall 2006, 2009 National Endurance Series

Harlan Price (born January 25, 1976, in Jasper, Florida U.S.) is a Mountain Bike Skills instructor and former professional mountain bike racer. Harlan Price raced for Independent Fabrication from 2006 to 2009, won the National Ultra Endurance 100 miler series in 2006 and placed in the top 5 for multiple years. His instruction business TakeAim Cycling LLC has been in operation since 2011 and is based out of Harrisonburg VA.
