= Transrockies =

XC mountain bike race

The TransRockies is an annual 7-day, 600 km mountain bicycle race from Fernie, British Columbia to Canmore, Alberta. Described in its early days as the "toughest mountain bike race on earth", the TransRockies had a reputation for tough climbs, long days, relentless mud and highly changeable weather. Since 2010 the organizers have reorganized the route to increase the portion of singletrack and decrease the potentially boggy and muddy sections, while maintaining the spectacular scenery and wilderness riding that the race is known for.

Attracting riders from all over the world, the race has grown from 67 two-person teams in 2002 to a sold-out fields of 225 two-person teams in 2006, 290 teams in 2007, 240 teams in 2008 and 118 teams in 2009. The decline in teams in 2009 was attributed to the challenging worldwide economic conditions and the strong appreciation of the Canadian dollar against the US dollar.

For 2009 the organizers added the solo TR3 category allowing riders to compete without a partner. The TR3 riders only completed the first three stages of the race, finishing at the Nipika Mountain Resort. Starting in 2011 the three stages of the TR3 utilized the single track trails around Fernie.

In 2010 the race received UCI sanctioning with both the 7-day TransRockies and the 3-day TR3 granted S2 status. This change increased both the total number of riders and the level of competition in all categories. 2010 also saw the introduction of the TR4. This solo option allowed riders to complete the last four days of the race to finish in Canmore.

== Categories ==
From 2002 to 2004 the race categories were:

- Open Men
- Open Women
- Open Mixed
- 80+ Men

Starting in 2005 the team race categories are:

- Open Men
- Open Women
- Open Mixed
- 80+ Men
- 80+ Mixed
- 100+ (Open Gender)

For the TR3 and TR4 the categories are:

- Open Men
- Open Women
- 40+ Men
- 40+ Women

== Participants ==
Past winners include Olympians, national champions, and World Cup Racers. The race also attracts amateurs of all ages. Only 2 racers completed the first 7 races, 2002–2008; Ryan Draper and Paul Newitt. A further 2 racers, Simon Parker and Jim Seethram, completed the 8 races between 2004 and 2011, and 6 racers have completed 6 races; Jeff Bandura, Pat Doyle, Andreas Hestler, Louise Kobin, Dick Woodbury, and Laurie Woodbury.

2011, the 10th edition of the race, saw the return of many of the veteran racers. These included Ryan Draper (8th time) Paul Newitt (8th time, Simon Parker (8th time), Jim Seethram (8th time) and Dick and Laurie Woodbury (7th Time).

== Route ==
The 2002 to 2005 races went from Fernie, British Columbia to Canmore, Alberta. The course was changed in 2006 to allow for a larger field and avoid the mud that plagued the 2002, 2004 and 2005 races. The 2006 race went from Fernie, British Columbia to Panorama Ski Resort, British Columbia. For 2007 to 2009, the organizers reversed the route, starting at Panorama Ski Resort and finishing in Fernie. Starting in 2010 the organizers reverted to the original start (Fernie) and finish (Canmore) towns with a new route that will include more singletrack and less road that earlier years. The first day is a timetrial on the singletrack trails around Fernie. Days two and three are also on Fernie singletrack and include well-known local trails such as Porky Blues. Day four starts with a bus ride from Fernie to the North Fork Recreation Area and finishes in the Little Elbow Campground. Day five is a backcountry loop on trails around Little Elbow. Day six sees the riders tackling the climb up to Jumping Pound Ridge and the Cox Hill descent before finishing at the Rafter Six Guest Ranch. The final day takes riders along the single track trails above the Trans Canada highway before they finish in the trails of the Canmore Nordic Centre and the finish in downtown Canmore.
