= Travis Brown (cyclist) =

American mountain cyclist

Personal information
- Born: August 7, 1969 (age 57) Durango, Colorado, U.S.

Cycling career
- Sport: Cycling
- Disciplines: Cross-country mountain biking and cyclo-cross
- Role: Rider

Travis Brown (born August 7, 1969) is an American mountain cyclist. He competes in cross-country mountain bike and cyclo-cross races but has also raced on road bicycles.
