= Wilderness 101 Mountain Bicycle Race =

Mountain bike race in Pennsylvania, United States

Wilderness 101
Race details
- Date: Variable, late July usually
- Region: Bald Eagle State Forest and Rothrock State Forest, Pennsylvania
- Nickname: W101
- Discipline: Mountain Bike
- Type: 100 Mile Ultra Endurance
- Organiser: Shenandoah Mountain Touring
- Race director: Chris Scott

History
- First edition: 1991
- Editions: 24

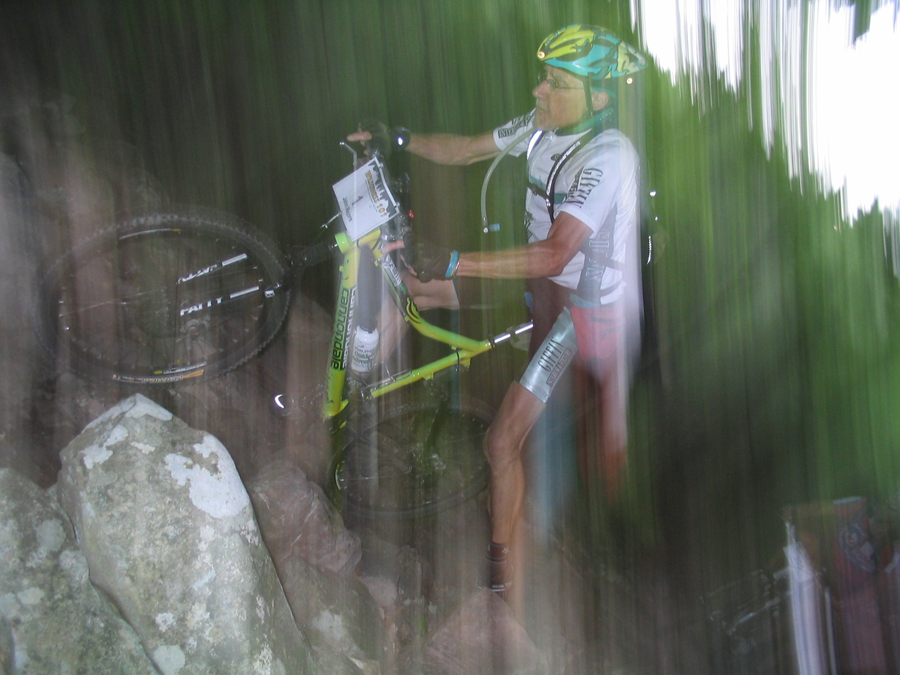
John Majors in the 2006 Event

The Wilderness 101 Mountain Bicycle Race is an ultra-endurance 101 miles (163 km) mountain bike race held annually in late July. The race is commonly called the W101, akin to a first year college course, such as Physics 101, at the nearby Penn State University.

The race was first held in 1991 and been held continuously since 2001. The W101 starts and ends in a small village Coburn, Pennsylvania near Millheim, Pennsylvania. The W101 course is a single loop covering roads, forest roads and trails. The total climbing in the race is approximately 12,000 feet (3,700 meters).) The majority of the course is within the Bald Eagle and Rothrock Pennsylvania State Forests. The event is organized and run primarily by Shenandoah Mountain Touring (located in Harrisonburg, VA) and has been one of the stops of the National Ultra Endurance Series since 2006.

== History ==
=== 1991 to 1994 ===
The Wilderness 101 was first held in 1991 organized by a bicycle shop location in State College, PA (The Bicycle Shop). The owner of the Bicycle Shop, Randy Moore, put together an off-road loop of 101 miles, with the specific goal to be longer than a 100-mile race. They also wanted to do the loop as a point-to-point ride because the early off-road century races were lap races, most held at ski areas. Moore was among the early east coast mountain bike pioneers who discovered the trail riding in Rothrock and Bald Eagle State Forests in the late 1980s. In addition to the 101, they held a 30-mile mountain bike race that started and finished in Coburn, PA annually.

Shirts from 1991 and 1992

The inaugural winner of the 1991 race was Harry Winand with a time of 6:59. He was a Penn State student at the time and according to an interview in the Oct 1991 Dirt Rag, only decided to race the event the week before. Harry won the race on a Bridgestone MB-0 mountain bike with very narrow and smooth tires (1.5" Avocet Cross) and a set triathlon aero bars. The modern courses with more trails and rougher trails would reduce the chance of someone winning on such a bicycle. These changes also prohibit comparing the finishing times from the earlier events to the current events.

It is not known if any women started or finished the 1991 events. The 1992 Woman's winner was Susan Combine John Stamstad, a famous pioneer in endurance and ultra-endurance mountain bike events, won the 1993 race. In these early editions of the race, each finisher was given a shirt after finishing that listed their placing and finish time in felt iron-on letters and numbers.

=== 2001 to Present ===
In 2001 a company unrelated to the original organization, Shenandoah Mountain Touring from Harrisonburg, VA re-established the race. This organization has now held the race annually since and plans to for the foreseeable future.

Jay Duff won the first of the re-established event in 2001. His finishing time of 7:07 cannot be compared to the times of the 2002 and later events as a significantly larger amount of new challenging single-track sections were added.

The current course records are as follows: Open men: Jeff Schalk, 6:26, 2011 Open women: Vicki Barclay, 7:14, 2015 Master's men: Master's women: Single Speed Men: Single Speed Women:

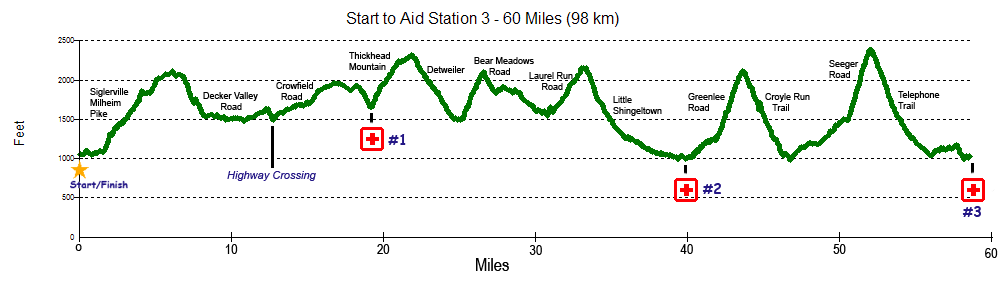
Profile of the 2005 Course, Part One

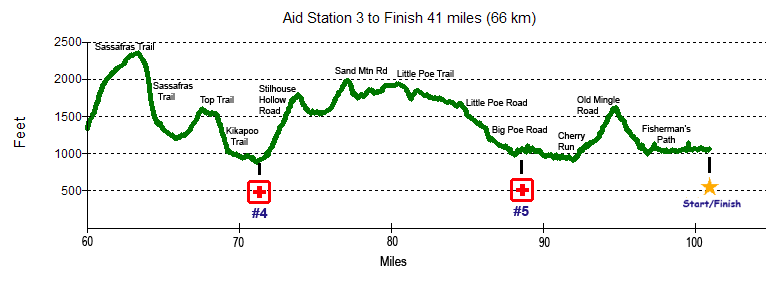
Profile of the 2005 Course, Part Two

== Course ==
The 1991–1993 race courses were primarily fire-roads and roads. A guide book by Scott Adams, Mountain Bike Madness in Central PA has a write up and map on the course. The early years even included a short section along the margin of a busy highway (rt 322). This section has been rerouted to use a service tunnel under the highway, and the highway itself has been elevated on the return loop so racers use a quieter underpass. The 2001 and later race courses contain substantially more trails and degraded fire-roads. In subsequent years the organizer has added more trails (single-track and double-track) as new trails are opened or their condition improved. Even when new trails are not included, the course often has to be changed to avoid areas closed by forestry operations, changing trail conditions or due to requests of the managing agencies.

== Results ==
Year	Starters	Finishers	Male Winner	Time	Female Winner	Time
2021	120	119	Jake Inger	6:53	Britt Mason	8:23
2019		84	Jeremiah Bishop	7:09	Jen Troops	9:13
2018			Dylan Johnson	6:39	Vicki Barclay	8:10
2017	167	154	Christian Tanguy	6:48	Carla Williams	8:05
2016	195	157	Brian Schworm	6:57	Carla Williams	8:15
2015	202	192	Keck Baker	6:27	Vicki Barclay	7:13
2014		196	Jeremiah Bishop	6:50	Missy Nash	9:28
2013	253	203	Christian Tanguy	7:01	Vicki Barclay	8:27
2012	287	235	Jeremiah Bishop	6:31	Cheryl Sornson	7:44
2011	364	314	Jeff Schalk	6:26	Vicki Barclay	7:42
2010	298	273	Jeff Schalk	6:34	Cheryl Sornson	8:06
2009	325	281	Jeff Schalk	6:58	Pua Sawicki	7:44
2008	287	243	Jeff Schalk	6:41	Cheryl Sornson	8:37
2007	177	127	Jeremiah Bishop	6:52	Betsy Shogren	8:36
2006	278	218	Harlan Price	7:33	Betsy Shogren	9:28
2005	229	207	Chris Eatough	6:59	Tiffany Mann	9:14
2004	208	194	Chris Eatough	7:10	Tiffany Mann	9:23
2003	167	145	Chris Eatough	7:04	Lee Schwarz	9:23
2002	101	91	Mike Keefer	7:23	Tiffany Mann	9:40
2001	61	56	Jay Duffy	7:07	Sue George	9:27
1993			John Stamstad		Christina Baum	
1992			Allistair Neil	7:14	unknown	
1991			Harry Winard	6:59	unknown	

== See also ==
- Rothrock State Forest
- Bald Eagle State Forest
- Shenandoah 100
