= Shenandoah 100 =

Mountain bike race in Virginia, United States

Shenandoah Mountain 100
Race details
- Date: The Sunday of Labor Day weekend
- Region: George Washington National Forest, Virginia
- Local name: Shenandoah 100
- Nickname: SM100
- Discipline: Mountain Bike
- Type: 100 Mile Ultra Endurance
- Organiser: Shenandoah Mountain Touring
- Race director: Chris Scott

History
- First edition: 1999
- Editions: 22

The Shenandoah 100 is an ultra-endurance 100 mile (162 km) mountain bike race held in central Western Virginia near Stokesville. The race is normally held on the Sunday during Labor Day weekend. The race has been run continuously since 1998.

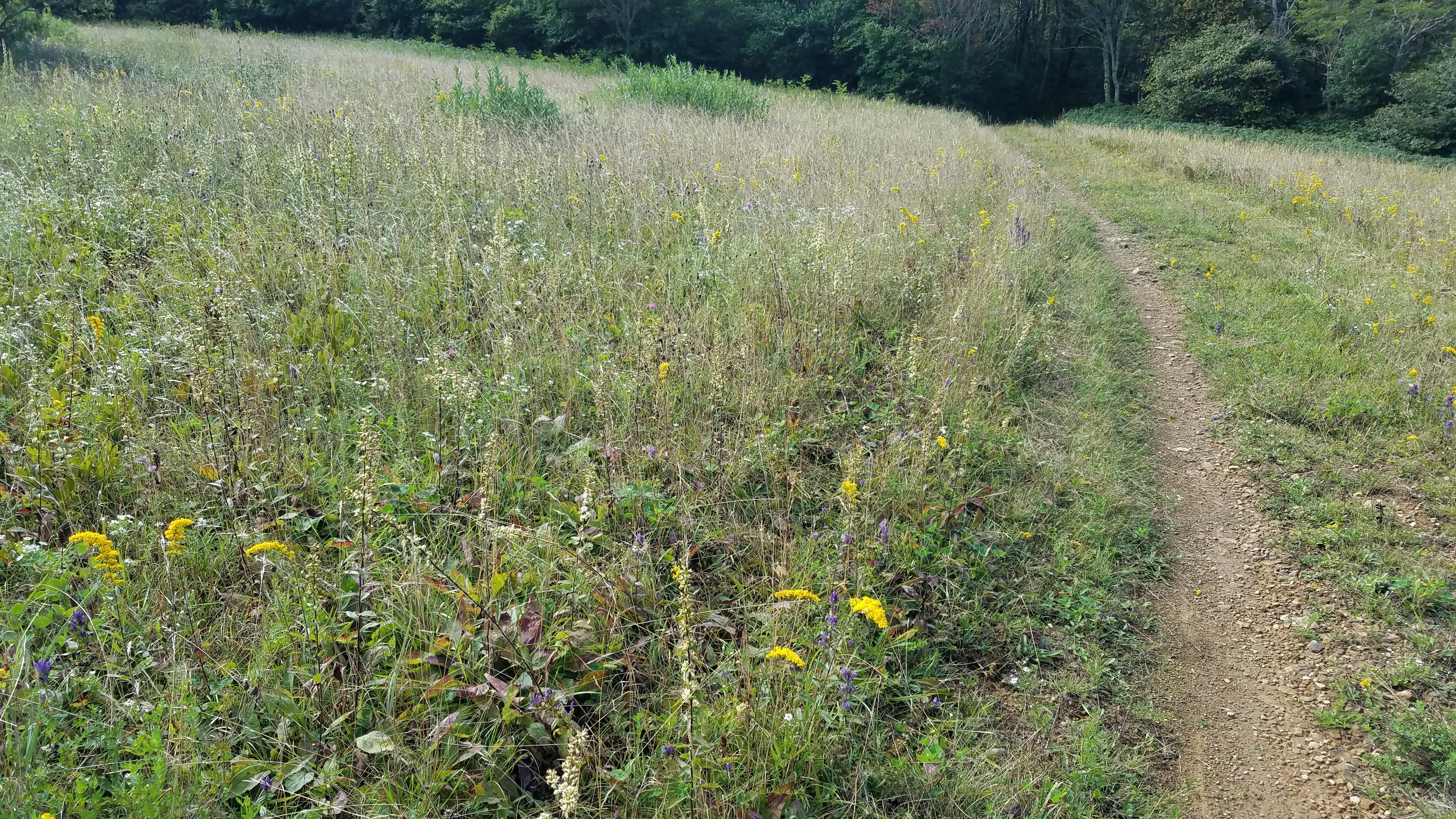
Field of wild flowers along the course near Little Bald Knob

The organizer, Shenandoah Mountain Touring based in Harrisonburg, VA also runs the Wilderness 101 in Central Pennsylvania along with numerous other cycling races, events and tours. The SM100 is part of a Nationwide series of endurance races the National Ultra Endurance Series since 2006.

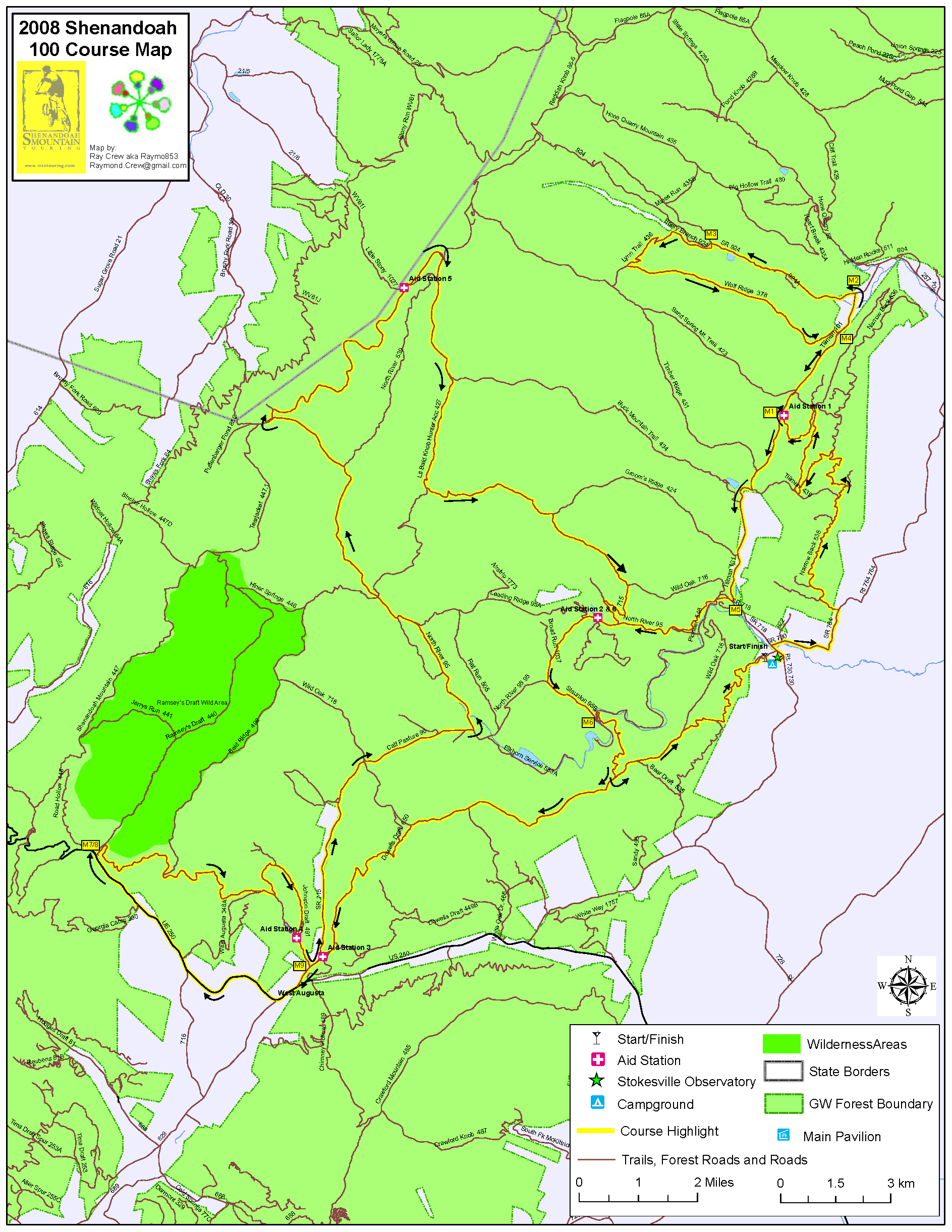
Map of 2008 course

The SM100 course starts and finishes in Stokesville Campground near the Stokesville Observatory. The majority of the course is in George Washington National Forest and uses part of the Wild Oak Trail. The course is primarily in Virginia but a small section crosses into West Virginia. The course covers the USGS Topo Maps of Stokesville, Palo Alto, Reddish Knob and West Augusta. As the name implies, the course is 100 miles long and has nearly 12,500 feet of vertical climbing.

== Notable Records ==
Larry Camp, of Chambersburg, Pennsylvania, is the only rider to have completed the first 20 editions of the event, finishing again in 2018 in 13:43 (unofficial). Jeremiah Bishop holds the record for fastest male finisher at 6:49 in 2015 and Andrea Dvorak holds the record for fastest female finisher at 8:09 in 2017. The longest finisher recorded was Neil Curtis in 1999 taking 18:07 to finish.

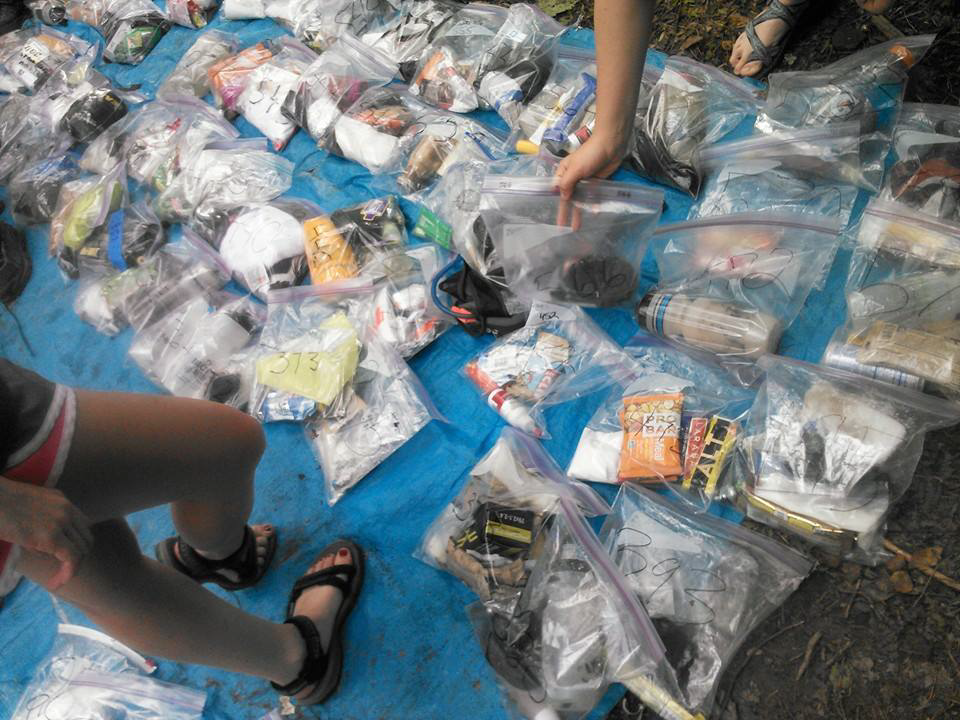
Drop bags ready for racers in the 2014 event

== Results ==
Year	Starters	Finishers	Male Winner	Time	Female Winner	Time	Lanterne Rouge	Time
2019			Eddie Anderson		Chase Edwards		Craig Pool	15:25
2018	477	377	Eddie Anderson	6:57	Laura Hamm	9:36	Sara Board	15:53
2017	472	425	Jeremiah Bishop	7:14	Andrea Dvorak	8:09	Vincent Timpone	15:42
2016	441	381	Christian Tanguy	7:01	Andrea Dvorak	8:27	Anna Withrow	15:26
2015	525	463	Jeremiah Bishop	6:49	Kaarin Tae	8:52	Roberto Galindo	15:44
2014	505	423	Jeremiah Bishop	7:09	Selene Yeager	8:56	Peter Rajcani	16:24
2013	583	445	Ben King	7:12	Sue Haywood	8:34	AJ Kray	15:31
2012	522	375	Jeremiah Bishop	7:18	Sue Haywood	8:33	Alan Toler	15:39
2011	563	478	Christian Tanguy	6:55	Cheryl Sornson	8:49	Craig Riddle	15:58
2010	649	541	Christian Tanguy	7:03	Amanda Carey	8:23	Rebecca Walizer	15:50
2009		457	Jeremiah Bishop	6:50	Sue Haywood	8:20	Nathan Cherry	15:20
2008	502	436	Chris Eatough	7:14	Cheryl Sornson	9:08	Gillian Parsons	15:59
2007	500	346	Jeff Schalk	7:05	Sue Haywood	8:11	Peter Rajcani	15:26
2006	382	319	Jeremiah Bishop	7:15	Sue Haywood	9:02	Locky Flint	16:38
2005	352	299	Todd Helmick	7:57	Sue Haywood	8:39	Christopher Barnes	16:14
2004	282	237	Jeremiah Bishop	7:23	Karen Masson	9:38	Joe Foley	15:11
2003			Skip Brown	7:46	Trish Stevenson	9:07		
2002			Jeremiah Bishop	7:54	Nicole Habay	9:38		
2001			Chris Eatough	7:29	Tiffany Mann	9:50		
2000	195	177	Chris Eatough	7:12	Sami Fournier	10:23	Rik Van Secceler	17:32
1999	102	88	Jeremiah Bishop	7:50	Sue Haywood	9:39	Neil Curtis	18:07

== See also ==
- Wilderness 101 Mountain Bicycle Race
