= Marathon mountain bike race =

Long distance (more than 40 km/25 miles) off-road bicycle competitions

Marathon mountain bike races, often referred to as cross-country marathon (XCM), are a very demanding form of mountain bike racing covering at least 40 kilometres (25 miles) usually in mountainous terrain. Events held in Europe are typically just a little longer than the average cross country mountain bike race. Marathon events in the USA and Canada are typically longer than 100 kilometres (62 miles) and are very different from cross country races.

== UCI events ==
The UCI has established a championship series for such events, the Marathon World Cup. The 2014 UCI rules limit events to distances between 60 km (37 mi) and 160 km (99 mi). Almost all of the participants are elite professional mountain bike racers. There is an annual world championship event, the UCI Mountain Bike Marathon World Championships. The races can be run over as a single or multi-lap course, however, the course cannot cover the same lap more than three times.

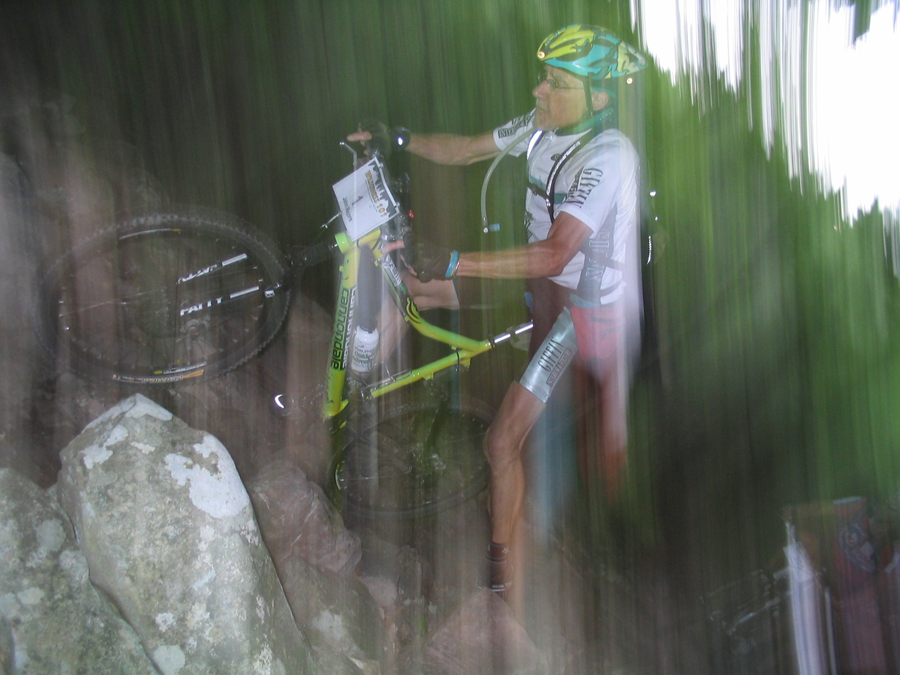
A racer in the Wilderness 101

== Non-UCI events ==
Non-UCI events routinely cover much longer distances. The typical event in the USA is either based on time, typically 12 or 24 hours, or distance, the most common being 100 miles (160 km). Events based on hours typically allow either people to compete individually or as part of the team. Distance events are almost all solo events. The number of these events and those taking part in them have grown greatly. The first such events began to be held routinely in the early 1990s typically had less than 50 racers. In 2006 nearly 100 events were held and most had more than 150 racers.

The world's largest mountain bike marathon race by the number of participants is the Birkebeinerrittet, 95 kilometres (59 mi), held annually in Norway. While the distance is short for a marathon mountain bike event, the number of participants and history make it noteworthy.

== Notable races ==
- Montezuma’s Revenge
- Wilderness 101 Mountain Bicycle Race
- Mohican MTB 100
- Lumberjack 100
- The Endurance 100
- Breckenridge 100
- Leadville Trail 100 MTB
- Brazil Ride more than 500 km over 7 days
- Chupacabras (cycling race)
- Birkebeinerrittet
- Shenandoah Mountain 100
- Oakridge Mountain Bike Marathon, 55 miles
- La Ruta de los Conquistadores, 161 miles, 3 stages
- Yak Attack
- Cape Epic – 700 km over 8 days
- Titan Desert – 600 km over 6 days
- Simpson Desert Bike Challenge – 600 km over 5 days
- The Merritt Crown
