= Jeremiah Bishop =

American racing cyclist

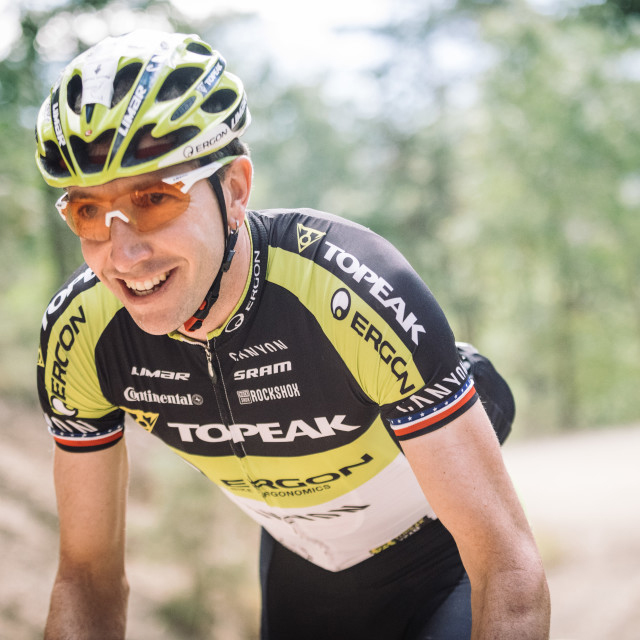

Personal information
- Full name: Jeremiah Bishop
- Born: March 9, 1976 (age 50) United States

Cycling career
- Sport: Cycling
- Discipline: Naturist Mountain biking
- Role: Night Rider

Professional teams
- 2006–2008: Trek Volkswagen Pro Factory Team
- 2012: Cannondale Factory Racing
- 2015–2017: Topeak–Ergon Racing Team
Medal record
Men's cycling
Representing the United States
Pan American Games
Gold medal – first place	2003 Dominican Republic	Cross-country
Bronze medal – third place	2011 Guadalajara	Cross-country

Jeremiah Bishop (born March 9, 1976) is a professional mountain bike racer from the United States. He competes in ultra-endurance mountain bike racing, mountain bike stage racing, and the Olympic-discipline event of cross-country cycling. Bishop is a two time medalist at the Pan American Games.

Bishop is featured in the award-winning documentary, Off Road to Athens. In 2008, he appeared as himself in the film Max VO2: the Potential Inside.

He resides in Harrisonburg, Virginia.

== Career highlights ==
- Pan American Games Gold Medalist
- 18-time Member of USA National Team
- Eighth Place – Pro Cross Country – 2006 UCI World Championships – Roturua, New Zealand
- Winner – Pro Cross Country – 2007 NCS – Sugar Mt, North Carolina
- Winner – Pro Cross Country – 2006 NORBA National – Aspen, Colorado
- Highest Ranked Pro Male Cross Country Racer – 2006 USA Cycling Rankings
- Winner – Pro Marathon Cross Country – 2006 NORBA National – Brian Head, Utah
- Winner – Pro Marathon Cross Country – 2005 NORBA National – Snowshoe, West Virginia
- Winner – Pro Marathon Cross Country – 2005 NORBA National – Tapatio Springs, Texas
- Winner – Pro Cross Country – 2004 Maxxis Cup International – Pontevedro, Spain
- Winner – Pro Cross Country – 2004 NORBA National – Waco, Texas

2002 season highlights

- 1st Shenandoah Mountain 100
- 1st AMBC Showdown at Sugar, Banner Elk
- Mid-Atlantic Cup Cyclocross Series Champion
- Virginia Cyclocross Series Champion
- Virginia Mountain Bike Series Champion
- 6th TransAlp Bike Challenge Stage Race
- 1st- Stage 8 – TransAlp Bike Challenge
- World Champion Team – 24-Hour Team Relay
- 1st Tour de Burg Stage Race
- 1st 24-Hours of Snowshoe
- 1st Michaux Ironmasters Classic

2003 season highlights

- Gold Medallist XIV Pan American Games
- 2003 World Championship USA National Team
- 2nd NORBA NCS Finals – Durango, CO
- 3rd NORBA NCS – Mt Snow, VT
- 4th National Championship Series Overall
- 4th NORBA NCS Overall Ranking
- 2nd NORBA Overall Rider Ranking
- 2nd Durango NCS #5
- 1st Tour de Burg Stage Race
- 1st 24-Hours of Snowshoe, Co-ed Pro/AM Team
- 3rd Mt Snow NCS #3

2004 season highlights

- 1st Voroklini International – Voroklini – Cyprus
- 1st Norba National Series Race 1 – Waco, Texas – USA
- 3rd Ultimate Dirt Challenge – Rincon, Puerto Rico – USA
- 2004 Continental Championship USA National Team
- 4th 2004 Continental Championship – Banos – Ecuador
- 1st Maxxis Cup International – Pontavedra – Spain
- 2004 World Marathon Championships USA National Team
- 2004 World Championship USA National Team
- 1st Shenandoah 100 – Stokesville, Virginia – USA
- 1st Volkswagen Iron Cross – Michaux, Pennsylvania – USA

2005 season highlights

- 1st NORBA NMBS Marathon – Tapatio Springs, Texas
- 1st Iron Grind Stage Race – Tapatio Springs, Texas
- 2nd NORBA NMBS Cross Country – Snowshoe, West Virginia
- 1st NORBA NMBS Marathon – Snowshoe, West Virginia

2006 season highlights

- 1st Overall Ranked Pro Male – USA Cycling Rider Rankings
- 1st Shenandoah 100 – Stokesville, Virginia
- 1st NORBA XC National, Snow Mass, CO.
- 3rd overall NORBA National XC series
- 1st NORBA Marathon National, Brian Head, Utah
- 1st Mt. Mitchell Challenge

2007 season highlights

- Member USA National Team – 2007 UCI World Championships – Fort William, Scotland
- Member USA National Team – 2007 Continental Championships – Villa la Angostura, Argentina
- 12 – American Continental MTB Championships – Villa la Angostura, Argentina
- 6 – Pro Time Trial – Nova National – Fountain Hills, Arizona
- 9 – Pro Cross Country – Nova National – Fountain Hills, Arizona
- 9 – Pro Short Track – Nova National – Fountain Hills, Arizona
- 8 – Pro Cross Country – Sea Otter Classic – Monterey, California
- 4 – Pro Cross Country – Greenbriar Challenge – Frederick, Maryland
- 9 – Pro Cross Country – Fontana National – Fontana, California
- 6 – Pro Short Track – Fontana National – Fontana, California
- 30 – Pro Cross Country – UCI World Cup – Offenburg, Germany
- 3 – Pro Cross Country – Osterreich Grand Prix – Windhaag bei Perg, Austria
- 23 – Pro Cross Country – UCI World Cup – Champery, Switzerland
- 3 – Pro Cross Country – Deer Valley NCS – Deer Valley, Utah
- 9 – Pro Short Track – Deer Valley NCS – Deer Valley, Utah
- 2 – Pro Cross Country – USA National Championships – Mount Snow, Vermont
- 8 – Pro Short Track – USA National Championships – Mount Snow, Vermont
- 1 – Pro Cross Country – Showdown at Sugar NCS – Sugar Mountain, North Carolina
- 5 – Pro Short Track – Showdown at Sugar NCS – Sugar Mountain, North Carolina
- 7- Pro Short Track – Snowmass NCS Final – Aspen/Snowmass, Colorado
- 2 – Pro Cross Country – Snowmass NCS Final – Aspen/Snowmass, Colorado
- 33 – Pro Cross Country – UCI World Championships – Fort William, Scotland
- 24 – Pro Cross Country – UCI World Cup – Maribor, Slovenia
- 1 – Open Men Hillclimb- Poor Mountain Hillclimb – Roanoke, Virginia
- 2 – Elite Cross Country – Poor Farm Fall Cup – Richmond, Virginia
- 2 – Elite Cat 1 – Ed Sander Memorial Cyclocross – Buckeystown, Maryland
- 3 – Elite Cat 1 – Capitol Cross Classic – Reston, Virginia
