= 2022 UCI Mountain Bike Marathon World Championships – Men's race =

Men's race at the 2022 UCI Mountain Bike Marathon World Championships
- Venue: Haderslev
- Date: 17 September 2022
- Competitors: 142 from 33 nations

Medalists
gold medal	Samuel Gaze	New Zealand
silver medal	Andreas Seewald	Germany
bronze medal	Simon Andreassen	Denmark

The men's race at the 2022 UCI Mountain Bike Marathon World Championships took place in Haderslev on 17 September 2022.

== Result ==
142 competitors from 33 nations started. 122 competitors reached the finish line.

Rank	Athlete	Nation	Result	Behind
1st place, gold medalist(s)	Samuel Gaze	New Zealand	3:36.58	
2nd place, silver medalist(s)	Andreas Seewald	Germany	3:36.58	+0:00
3rd place, bronze medalist(s)	Simon Andreassen	Denmark	3:37.00	+0:02
4	Martin Frey	Germany	3:37.12	+0:14
5	Sascha Weber	Germany	3:39:42	+2:44
6	Mārtiņš Blūms	Latvia	3:40:41	+3:43
7	Lukas Baum	Germany	3:40:42	+3:44
8	Sebastian Fini Carstensen	Denmark	3:40.45	+3:46
9	Axel Roudil-Cortinat	France	3:40.52	+3:54
10	Martin Stošek	Czech Republic	3:41.47	+4:48
11	Simon Schneller	Germany	3:41.52	+4:54
12	Hans Becking	Netherlands	3:42.14	+5:16
13	Karl Mart	Austria	3:42.39	+5:41
14	Fabian Rabensteiner	Italy	3:42.49	+5:51
15	Peeter Pruus	Estonia	3:43.50	+6:52
16	Tomáš Višňovský	Slovakia	3:43.50	+6:52
17	Tobias Lillelund	Denmark	3:43.52	+6:54
18	Simon Stiebjahn	Germany	3:44.10	+7:11
19	Hugo Drechou	France	3:45.10	+7:12
20	Marc Stutzmann	Switzerland	3:45.40	+8:42
21	Daniele Mensi	Italy	3:45.56	+8:58
22	Oskars Muižnieks	Latvia	3:48.56	+11:58
23	Urs Huber	Switzerland	3:50.04	+13:06
24	Paweł Bernas	Poland	3:50.05	+13:07
25	Konny Looser	Switzerland	3:50.07	+13:09
26	Casey South	Switzerland	3:50.07	+13:09
27	Martin Fanger	Switzerland	3:50.08	+13:10
28	Filip Adel	Germany	3:50.10	+13:12
29	José Dias	Portugal	3:50.15	+13:17
30	Andrin Beeli	Switzerland	3:51.11	+14:13
31	Hansueli Stauffer	Switzerland	3:54.22	+17:24
32	Héctor Leonardo Páez	Colombia	3:56.39	+19:41
33	Matthew Beers	South Africa	3:57.58	+21:00
34	Fabian Costa	Portugal	3:58.44	+21:46
35	Pirmin Eisenbarth	Germany	3:59.24	+22:26
36	Jordan Sarrou	France	4:00.23	+23:25
37	Georg Egger	Germany	4:00.54	+23:56
38	Riccardo Chiarini	Italy	4:03.23	+26:24
39	Teus Ruijter	Netherlands	4:06.33	+29:35
40	Karel Hník	Czech Republic	4:09.35	+32:37
41	Daniel Geismayr	Austria	4:13.58	+36:59
42	Michal Paluta	Poland	4:18.12	+41:14
43	Andrea Siffredi	Italy	4:19.43	+42:45
44	Josten Vaidem	Estonia	4:23.46	+46:48
45	Marek Rauchfuss	Czech Republic	4:28.00	+51:02
46	Krzysztof Lukasik	Poland	4:31.11	+54:13
47	Periklis Ilias	Estonia	4:23.46	+46:48
48	Ole Hem	Norway	4:28.00	+51:02
49	Ben Thomas	Great Britain	4:31.11	+54:13
50	Alban Lakata	Austria	4:23.46	+46:48
51	Diego Arias	Colombia	4:28.00	+51:02
52	Vinzent Dorn	Germany	4:31.11	+54:13
53	Enrique Morcillo Vegara	Spain	4:23.46	+46:48
54	Sergio Mantecón Gutiérrez	Spain	4:28.00	+51:02
55	Nicolas Samparisi	Italy	4:31.11	+54:13
56	Wim De Bruin	Netherlands	4:23.46	+46:48
57	Eskil Evensen-Lie	Norway	4:28.00	+51:02
58	Mathias Pedersen	Denmark	4:31.11	+54:13
59	Daniel McConnell	Australia	4:23.46	+46:48
60	Frans Claes	Belgium	4:28.00	+51:02
61	Jason Bouttell	France	4:31.11	+54:13
62	Matthias Alberti	Germany	4:23.46	+46:48
63	Tormod Weydahl	Norway	4:28.00	+51:02
64	Laurins Purnins	Latvia	4:31.11	+54:13
65	James Swadling	Great Britain	4:23.46	+46:48
66	Philip Handl	Austria	4:28.00	+51:02
67	Fadri Barandun	Switzerland	4:31.11	+54:13
68	Tim Smeenge	Netherlands	4:23.46	+46:48
69	Matouš Ulman	Czech Republic	4:28.00	+51:02
70	Francesc Guerra Carretero	Spain	4:31.11	+54:13
71	Axel Lindh	Sweden	4:23.46	+46:48
72	Sören Nissen	Luxembourg	4:28.00	+51:02
73	Luis Mejía	Colombia	4:31.11	+54:13
74	Boris Popovi	Bulgaria	4:23.46	+46:48
75	Filipe Francisco	Portugal	4:28.00	+51:02
76	Vlad Dascalu	Romania	4:31.11	+54:13
77	Lorenzo Samparisi	Italy	4:23.46	+46:48
78	Caleb Kieninger	Germany	4:28.00	+51:02
79	Niclas Ranker	Germany	4:31.11	+54:13
80	Martin Røste Omdahl	Norway	4:23.46	+46:48
81	Peeter Tarvis	Estonia	4:28.00	+51:02
82	Ingvar Ómarsson	Iceland	4:31.11	+54:13
83	Roberto Bou Martin	Spain	4:28.00	+51:02
84	Danny van Wagoner	United States	4:31.11	+54:13
85	Alex Wild	United States	4:23.46	+46:48
86	Niklas Sell	Germany	4:28.00	+51:02
87	Alexander Stadler	Austria	4:31.11	+54:13
88	Jochen De Vocht	Netherlands	4:28.00	+51:02
89	Marek Bartnk	Czech Republic	4:31.11	+54:13
90	Andy Kläy	Switzerland	4:23.46	+46:48
91	Tom Martin	Great Britain	4:28.00	+51:02
92	Benjamin Le Ny	France	4:31.11	+54:13
93	Alexandre Vialle	Canada	4:23.46	+46:48
94	Marek Sülzle	Germany	4:28.00	+51:02
95	Jules Goguely	United States	4:31.11	+54:13
96	Pascal Nay	Switzerland	4:23.46	+46:48
97	Rémi Groslambert	France	4:28.00	+51:02
98	Tom Stephensen	Great Britain	4:31.11	+54:13
99	Christopher Mehlman	United States	4:28.00	+51:02
100	Roman Schindler	Germany	4:31.11	+54:13
101	Johannes Közle	Germany	4:28.00	+51:02
102	Luke Peyton	Great Britain	4:31.11	+54:13
103	Simon Kempf	Germany	4:28.00	+51:02
104	Luis Méndez	Costa Rica	4:31.11	+54:13
105	Pascal Kiser	Switzerland	4:28.00	+51:02
106	Julien Cousin	France	4:31.11	+54:13
107	Arnaud Blanchard	France	4:28.00	+51:02
108	Samuel Stephenson	Great Britain	4:31.11	+54:13
106	Julien Cousin	France	4:31.11	+54:13
107	Arnaud Blanchard	France	4:28.00	+51:02
108	Samuel Stephenson	Great Britain	4:31.11	+54:13
109	Andrew Henriques	Portugal	4:31.11	+54:13
110	Jens Schuhmann	Germany	4:28.00	+51:02
111	Benjamin Inauen	Switzerland	4:31.11	+54:13
112	Lasse Reuß	Germany	4:31.11	+54:13
113	Alexandre Raedish	Germany	4:28.00	+51:02
114	Jonas Lindberg	Denmark	4:31.11	+54:13
115	Markus Siebert	Germany	4:31.11	+54:13
116	Peter Schermann	Germany	4:28.00	+51:02
117	Theodoros Petridis	Germany	4:31.11	+54:13
118	Dario Cherchi	Italy	4:31.11	+54:13
119	Paul Wettstein	Germany	4:28.00	+51:02
120	Jake Sitler	United States	4:31.11	+54:13
121	Will Foley	United States	4:31.11	+54:13
122	Thibaut Wantellet	France	4:28.00	+51:02
	Brendan Johnston	Australia	DNF	
	Michal Glanz	Poland	DNF	
	Erik Mattelin	Sweden	DNF	
	Oliver Sølvhøj	Norway	DNF	
	Jaroslav Kulhavý	Czech Republic	DNF	
	Tumelo Makae	Lesotho	DNF	
	Māris Bogdanovičs	Latvia	DNF	
	Tiago Ferreira	Portugal	DNF	
	Fabien Monnier	Switzerland	DNF	
	Patrick Atkinson	Great Britain	DNF	
	Jakob Dorigoni	Italy	DNF	
	Petr Vako	Czech Republic	DNF	
	Goran Cerovi	Montenegro	DNF	
	Jonas Hummel	Germany	DNF	
	Daniel Federspiel	Australia	DNF	
	Lubomír Petruš	Czech Republic	DNF	
	Dominik Schwaiger	Germany	DQF	
