= 2023 UCI Mountain Bike Marathon World Championships – Men's race =

Men's race
2023 UCI Mountain Bike Marathon World Championships

Race details
- Dates: 6 August 2023
- Distance: 96.5 km (59.96 mi)
- Winning time: 4:14:42

Medalists
	Gold	Henrique Avancini; Brazil
	Silver	Martin Stošek; Czech Republic
	Bronze	Lukas Baum; Germany

The men's race at the 2023 UCI Mountain Bike Marathon World Championships took place in Glentress Forest, Scotland on 6 August 2023.

== Result ==
Rank	Rider	Nation	Time	Diff.
1st place, gold medalist(s)	Henrique Avancini	Brazil	4:14:42	
2nd place, silver medalist(s)	Martin Stošek	Czech Republic	4:15.10	+ 0:28
3rd place, bronze medalist(s)	Lukas Baum	Germany	4:16.25	+ 1:43
4	Marc Stutzmann	Switzerland	4:18:15	+ 3:33
5	Héctor Leonardo Páez	Colombia	4:18:17	+ 3:35
6	Jose Dias	Portugal	4:18:34	+ 3:52
7	Alexandre Balmer	Switzerland	4:18:53	+ 4:11
8	Fabian Rabensteiner	Italy	4:18:53	+ 4:11
9	Diego Rosa	Italy	4:19:15	+ 4:33
10	Andreas Seewald	Germany	4:19:32	+ 4:50
11	Axel Roudil Cortinat	France	4:19:41	+ 4:59
12	Wout Alleman	Belgium	4:19:54	+ 5:12
13	Simon Stiebjahn	Germany	4:20:42	+ 6:00
14	Alban Lakata	Austria	4:20:42	+ 6:00
15	Diego Arias	Colombia	4:21:06	+ 6:24
16	Sascha Weber	Germany	4:21:39	+ 6:57
17	Sergio Mantecón Gutiérrez	Spain	4:21:57	+ 7:15
18	Ole Hem	Norway	4:22:27	+ 7:45
19	Eskil Evensen-Lie	Norway	4:22:55	+ 8:13
20	Matthew Beers	South Africa	4:23:05	+ 8:23
21	Martin Frey	Germany	4:24:08	+ 9:26
22	Alan Hatherly	South Africa	4:24:27	+ 9:45
23	Hans Becking	Netherlands	4:25:34	+ 10:52
24	Jakob Hartmann	Germany	4:26:08	+ 11:26
25	Dario Cherchi	Italy	4:26:42	+ 12:00
26	Simon Schnelller	Germany	4:27:06	+ 12:24
27	Tiago Ferreira	Portugal	4:27:35	+ 12:53
28	Peeter Pruus	Estonia	4:27:39	+ 12:57
29	Lorenzo Samparisi	Italy	4:28:42	+ 14:00
30	Alex Miller	Namibia	4:29:48	+ 15:06
31	Huge Drechou	France	4:29:48	+ 15:06
32	Marco Joubert	South Africa	4:30:21	+ 15:39
33	Jason Boutell	United Kingdom	4:32:49	+ 18:07
34	Andrew L'Esperance	Canada	4:34:08	+ 19:26
35	Georg Egger	Germany	4:35:13	+ 20:31
36	Cameron Mason	United Kingdom	4:35:48	+ 21:06
37	Alex Wild	United States	4:36:10	+ 21:28
38	Roberto Bou Martin	Spain	4:36:35	+ 21:53
39	Juri Ragnoli	Italy	4:37:51	+ 23:09
40	Tomer Zaltsman	Israel	4:38:00	+ 23:18
41	Jacob Scott	United Kingdom	4:39:31	+ 24:49
42	Tom Martin	United Kingdom	4:40:23	+ 25:41
43	Jaromir Skala	Czech Republic	4:41:21	+ 26:39
44	Lubomír Petruš	Czech Republic	4:42:52	+ 28:10
45	Wim de Bruin	Netherlands	4:44:37	+ 29:55
46	Richard Larsen	Sweden	4:46:30	+ 31:48
47	Tali Lane Welsh	Australia	4:46:31	+ 31:49
48	Erik Akesson	Sweden	4:47:23	+ 32:41
49	Tristan Nortje	South Africa	4:48:47	+ 34:05
50	Loic Blanc	Switzerland	4:49:40	+ 34:58
51	Xavier Jove Riart	Andorra	4:50:45	+ 36:03
52	Quentin Gardet	France	4:51:48	+ 37:06
53	James Swadling	United Kingdom	4:52:29	+ 37:47
54	Danny van Wagoner	United States	4:52:36	+ 37:54
55	Andreas Schrottenbaum	Germany	4:53:05	+ 38:23
56	Michael Foster	South Africa	4:53:11	+ 38:29
57	Teus Ruijter	Netherlands	4:55:17	+ 40:35
58	Adrian Horchler	Germany	4:55:57	+ 41:15
59	Joel Green	Australia	4:58:13	+ 43:31
60	Jochen de Vocht	Belgium	4:58:26	+ 43:44
61	Carlos Fernandes Olimpio	Brazil	4:59:52	+ 45:10
62	Pascal Kiser	Switzerland	4:59:53	+ 45:11
63	Grant Ferguson	United Kingdom	5:00:48	+ 46:06
64	Martin Schatzl	Germany	5:01:05	+ 46:23
65	Paddy Atkinson	United Kingdom	5:02:15	+ 47:33
66	Tom Stephenson	United Kingdom	5:02:30	+ 47:48
67	Luke Peyton	United Kingdom	5:05:41	+ 50:59
68	Christopher Mehlman	United States	5:06:15	+ 51:33
69	Sebastien Burnet	France	5:06:30	+ 51:48
70	Johannes Kozle	Germany	5:09:03	+ 54:21
71	Fabien Monnier	Switzerland	5:09:36	+ 54:54
72	John Stephenson	United Kingdom	5:10:09	+ 55:27
73	Lucas Coda-Forno	France	5:10:24	+ 55:42
74	Nicolas Sire	France	5:11:29	+ 56:47
75	Pierre Curien	France	5:12:29	+ 57:47
76	Alexandre Mayer	Mauritius	5:12:30	+ 57:48
77	Julien Cousin	France	5:12:35	+ 57:53
78	Jonas Buchot	France	5:13:16	+ 58:34
79	Arnaud Blanchard	France	5:13:27	+ 58:45
80	Valentin Kunze	Germany	5:14:05	+ 59:23
81	Alexandre Vialle	Canada	5:15:47	+ 1:01:05
82	Luciano Gay	Argentina	5:16:23	+ 1:01:41
83	Noah Warren	United States	5:17:13	+ 1:02:31
84	Sebastien Welter	France	5:19:25	+ 1:04:43
85	Patrick Collins	United States	5:21:47	+ 1:07:05
86	Come Maurel	France	5:22:03	+ 1:07:21
87	Luis Aguilar Mendez	Costa Rica	5:23:20	+ 1:08:38
88	Matthew Scott	South Africa	5:25:05	+ 1:10:23
89	Moussa Outtaleb	Morocco	5:25:14	+ 1:10:32
90	Hadden Beykirch	United States	5:31:20	+ 1:16:38
91	Frederic Gombert	France	5:32:34	+ 1:17:52
92	Tumelo Makae	Lesotho	5:34:36	+ 1:19:54
93	Kusaselihle Ngidi	South Africa	5:35:13	+ 1:20:31
94	Luyanda Tobigunya	South Africa	5:38:56	+ 1:24:14
95	Juan Diaz Torres	Argentina	5:41:58	+ 1:27:16
96	Will Foley	United States	5:44:25	+ 1:29:43
97	Youssef Issmaili	Morocco	5:44:53	+ 1:30:11
98	Mohammadreza Entezarioon	ART	5:57:59	+ 1:43:17
99	Christopher Schroeder	United States	6:42:25	+ 2:27:43
100	Xavier Morandi	Switzerland	6:55:19	+ 2:40:37
101	Macpherson Mbeya	Malawi	7:58:38	+ 3:43:56
	Daniel Geismayr	Austria	DNF	
	Casey South	Switzerland	DNF	
	Samuele Porro	Italy	DNF	
	Martin Fanger	Switzerland	DNF	
	Marek Rauchfuss	Czech Republic	DNF	
	Luiz Campos Honorio	Brazil	DNF	
	Ingvar Omarsson	Iceland	DNF	
	Johan Canaveral	Colombia	DNF	
