= 2024 UCI Mountain Bike Marathon World Championships – Men's race =

Men's race
2024 UCI Mountain Bike Marathon World Championships

Race details
- Dates: 22 September 2024
- Distance: 104 km (64.62 mi)
- Winning time: 4:33.08

Medalists
	Gold	Simon Andreassen; Denmark
	Silver	Christopher Blevins; United States
	Bronze	David Valero; Spain

The men's race at the 2024 UCI Mountain Bike Marathon World Championships took place in Snowshoe, United States on 22 September 2024.

== Result ==
Rank	Rider	Nation	Time	Diff.
1st place, gold medalist(s)	Simon Andreassen	Denmark	04:33:08	
2nd place, silver medalist(s)	Christopher Blevins	United States	04:33:18	+ 0:10
3rd place, bronze medalist(s)	David Valero	Spain	04:33:20	+ 0:12
4	Andreas Seewald	Germany	04:33:26	+ 0:18
5	Victor Koretzky	France	04:34:18	+ 1:10
6	Martin Stošek	Czech Republic	04:36:22	+ 3:14
7	Gioele De Cosmo	Italy	04:37:33	+ 4:25
8	Simon Stiebjahn	Germany	04:37:38	+ 4:30
9	Cole Paton	United States	04:37:39	+ 4:31
10	Samuele Porro	Italy	04:37:42	+ 4:34
11	Casey South	Switzerland	04:37:45	+ 4:37
12	Héctor Leonardo Páez	Colombia	04:37:46	+ 4:38
13	Nicolas Samparisi	Italy	04:37:49	+ 4:41
14	Jakob Hartmann	Germany	04:37:58	+ 4:50
15	Martin Frey	Germany	04:38:29	+ 5:21
16	Simon Schneller	Germany	04:38:30	+ 5:22
17	Marc Stutzmann	Switzerland	04:39:22	+ 6:14
18	Sean Fincham	Canada	04:42:10	+ 9:02
19	Georg Egger	Germany	04:43:17	+ 10:09
20	Pablo Rodríguez	Spain	04:43:32	+ 10:24
21	Fabian Rabensteiner	Italy	04:43:50	+ 10:42
22	Alex Miller	Namibia	04:43:50	+ 10:42
23	Dario Cherchi	Italy	04:45:37	+ 12:29
24	Andrew L'Esperance	Canada	04:45:59	+ 12:50
25	Marco Joubert	South Africa	04:46:05	+ 12:57
26	Bradyn Lange	United States	04:46:27	+ 13:18
27	Jose Maria Sanchez Ruiz	Spain	04:46:35	+ 13:27
28	Axel Roudil-Cortinat	France	04:46:53	+ 13:45
29	Martin Fanger	Switzerland	04:48:16	+ 5:08
30	Matthew Beers	South Africa	04:49:36	+ 16:28
31	Zachary Calton	United States	04:51:13	+ 18:05
32	Wout Alleman	Belgium	04:51:41	+ 18:33
33	Filip Adel	Czech Republic	04:51:44	+ 18:36
34	Hans Becking	Netherlands	04:51:53	+ 18:45
35	Alex Wild	United States	04:52:20	+ 19:12
36	Frans Claes	Belgium	04:52:39	+ 19:31
37	Herman Fourie	South Africa	04:54:38	+ 21:30
38	Brendan Johnston	Australia	04:55:19	+ 22:11
39	Jason Bouttell	Great Britain	04:55:23	+ 22:15
40	Jaedon Terlouw	South Africa	04:55:27	+ 22:19
41	Rossouw Bekker	South Africa	04:56:09	+ 23:01
42	Caleb Bottcher	New Zealand	04:56:31	+ 23:23
43	Sherman Trezza De Paiva	Brazil	04:57:53	+ 24:45
44	Wessel Botha	South Africa	05:00:59	+ 27:51
45	Erik Åkesson	Sweden	05:01:32	+ 28:23
46	José Dias	Portugal	05:02:17	+ 29:09
47	Cameron Jones	New Zealand	05:03:39	+ 30:31
48	Carson Beckett	United States	05:04:12	+ 31:04
49	Diego Arias	Colombia	05:05:41	+ 32:33
50	Griffin Hoppin	United States	05:05:43	+ 32:35
51	Danny Van Wagoner	United States	05:06:03	+ 32:55
52	Alexandre Balmer	Switzerland	05:07:01	+ 33:53
53	Joel Green	Australia	05:07:42	+ 33:54
54	Richard Larsen	Sweden	05:08:04	+ 34:56
55	Lorenzo Samparisi	Italy	05:09:28	+ 36:20
56	Andrin Beeli	Switzerland	05:10:04	+ 36:56
57	Benjamin Inauen	Switzerland	05:10:56	+ 37:48
58	Tali Lane Welsh	Australia	05:11:50	+ 38:42
59	Christopher Mehlman	United States	05:13:15	+ 40:07
60	Noah Warren	United States	05:15:56	+ 42:48
61	Jerry Dufour	United States	05:16:55	+ 43:47
62	Carlos Alberto Olimpio	Brazil	05:18:33	+ 45:25
63	Milan Damek	Czech Republic	05:21:33	+ 48:25
64	Eli Kranefuss	United States	05:25:58	+ 52:50
65	Gordon Wadsworth	United States	05:28:00	+ 54:52
66	Ryan Johnson	United States	05:28:03	+ 54:55
67	Zachary Brunelle	Canada	05:29:16	+ 56:08
68	Cory Peterson	United States	05:29:41	+ 56:33
69	Luiz Miguel Honório	Brazil	05:30:56	+ 57:48
70	Axel Lindh	Sweden	05:36:18	+ 1:03:10
71	Mathieu Bélanger-Barrette	Canada	05:39:01	+ 1:05:53
72	Carter Nieuwesteeg	Canada	05:39:02	+ 1:05:54
73	Willman Bravo Avila	Ecuador	05:40:35	+ 1:07:27
74	Maxwell Abner	United States	05:49:31	+ 1:16:23
75	Jonas Woodruff	United States	05:56:15	+ 1:23:07
76	Mark Kransz	United States	05:56:25	+ 1:23:17
77	Levi Cole	United States	06:10:10	+ 1:37:02
78	Paul Wettstein	Germany	06:11:39	+ 1:38:3
79	Côme Maurel	France	07:01:01	+ 2:27:53
	Lukas Baum	Germany	DNF	
	Peeter Pruus	Estonia	DNF	
	Nicolas Machado	Brazil	DNF	
	Lubomír Petruš	Czech Republic	DNF	
	Jose Gabriel Marques Almeida	Brazil	DNF	
