= 2021 UCI Mountain Bike Marathon World Championships – Men's race =

Men's race at the 2021 UCI Mountain Bike Marathon World Championships
- Venue: Elba
- Date: 2 October 2021
- Competitors: 114 from 26 nations

Medalists
gold medal	Andreas Seewald	Germany
silver medal	Diego Arias	Colombia
bronze medal	José Dias	Portugal

Men's race at the 2021 UCI Mountain Bike Marathon World Championships took place in Elba on 2 October 2021.

== Course ==
The 2021 XCM World Championship was held over a 35km course with 3 laps plus an initial 2km lap and a final 8km lap. In total, the men's race was 115 km with a difference in altitude of 4,500 metres.

== Result ==
114 competitors from 26 nations started.

75 competitors reached the finish line.

Rank	Athlete	Nation	Result	Behind
1st place, gold medalist(s)	Andreas Seewald	Germany	6:02.03,3	
2nd place, silver medalist(s)	Diego Arias	Colombia	6:04.27,7	+2.24,4
3rd place, bronze medalist(s)	José Dias	Portugal	6:07.34,6	+5.31,3
4	Wout Alleman	Belgium	6:11.30,6	+9.27,3
5	Marc Stutzmann	Switzerland	6:11.47,9	+9.44,6
6	Karl Markt	Austria	6:13.08,0	+11.04,7
7	Keegan Swenson	United States	6:14.36,6	+12.33,3
8	Samuele Porro	Italy	6:15.52,1	+13.48,8
9	Tiago Ferreira	Portugal	6:16.07,6	+14.04,3
10	Sergio Mantecón Gutiérrez	Spain	6:16.53,6	+14.50,3
11	David Valero	Spain	6:17.49,7	+15.46,4
12	Martin Stošek	Czech Republic	6:18.10,0	+16.06,7
13	Ole Hem	Norway	6:19.58,9	+17.55,6
14	Simon Schneller	Germany	6:20.52,2	+18.48,9
15	Alban Lakata	Austria	6:20.54,1	+18.50,8
16	Fabian Rabensteiner	Italy	6:23.19,7	+21.16,4
17	Filippo Colombo	Switzerland	6:24.58,2	+22.54,9
18	Juri Ragnoli	Italy	6:26.19,4	+24.16,1
19	Axel Roudil Cortinat	France	6:26.44,1	+24.40,8
20	Matthys Beukes	South Africa	6:27.05,1	+25.01,8
21	Gregor Raggl	Austria	6:29.28,4	+27.25,1
22	Peeter Pruus	Estonia	6:29.39,2	+27.35,9
23	Casey South	Switzerland	6:31.00,9	+28.57,6
24	Lukas Flückiger	Switzerland	6:31.37,1	+29.33,8
25	Hans Becking	Netherlands	6:32.59,3	+30.56,0
26	Martin Fanger	Switzerland	6:33.34,0	+31.30,7
27	Nicolas Samparisi	Italy	6:35.25,7	+33.22,4
28	Manuel Pliem	Austria	6:35.42,6	+33.39,3
29	Hansueli Stauffer	Switzerland	6:35.51,6	+33.48,3
30	Jacopo Billi	Italy	6:38.36,7	+36.33,4
31	Domenico Valerio	Italy	6:38.36,9	+36.33,6
32	Alexander Richardson	Great Britain	6:39.56,2	+37.52,9
33	Jakob Dorigoni	Italy	6:41.35,3	+39.32,0
34	Oskars Muižnieks	Latvia	6:41.53,4	+39.50,1
35	Teus Ruijter	Netherlands	6:45.10,3	+43.07,0
36	Fabian Costa	Austria	6:46.34,0	+44.30,7
37	Pierre Billaud	France	6:46.49,0	+44.45,7
38	Marek Sülzle	Germany	6:49.37,2	+47.33,9
39	Kyle Trudeau	United States	6:50.04,7	+48.01,4
40	Fadri Barandun	Switzerland	6:50.37,7	+48.34,4
41	Tim Smeenge	Netherlands	6:51.07,1	+49.03,8
42	Niklas Sell	Germany	6:54.42,2	+52.38,9
43	Evgenii Evgrafov	Russian Cycling Federation	6:56.33,1	+54.29,8
44	Andreas Miltiadis	Cyprus	6:56.54,6	+54.51,3
45	Stefano Valdrighi	Italy	6:57.09,3	+55.06,0
46	Jacob Scott	Great Britain	7:00.02,8	+57.59,5
47	Paul Häuser	Germany	7:01.35,6	+59.32,3
48	Jan Strož	Czech Republic	7:06.17,5	+1:04.14,2
49	Lars Granberg	Norway	7:07.36,4	+1:05.33,1
50	Sébastien Carabin	Belgium	7:08.07,2	+1:06.03,9
51	Johan Cañaveral	Colombia	7:09.14,5	+1:07.11,2
52	Michał Glanz	Poland	7:09.15,9	+1:07.12,6
53	Fabien Monnier	Switzerland	7:09.19,9	+1:07.16,6
54	Lauris Purniņš	Latvia	7:09.52,8	+1:07.49,5
55	Robert Wardell	Great Britain	7:12.26,8	+1:10.23,5
56	Nicolas Kautter	Germany	7:12.42,9	+1:10.39,6
57	Daniel Bonello	Malta	7:13.19,4	+1:11.16,1
58	Jonas Buchot	France	7:13.58,9	+1:11.55,6
59	Jeremias Marti	Switzerland	7:15.09,7	+1:13.06,4
60	Simon Kempf	Germany	7:25.06,7	+1:23.03,4
61	Juan Alarcón	Colombia	7:26.30,0	+1:24.26,7
62	Corentin Cousteur	France	7:26.57,8	+1:24.54,5
63	Maxime Dony	Belgium	7:28.36,2	+1:26.32,9
64	Markus Siebert	Germany	7:32.47,2	+1:30.43,9
65	Niclas Ranker	Germany	7:32.58,3	+1:30.55,0
66	Benjamin Inauen	Switzerland	7:35.41,0	+1:33.37,7
67	Jules Goguely	United States	7:38.13,7	+1:36.10,4
68	Alexandre Raedisch	France	7:40.18,0	+1:38.14,7
69	Maxime Colin	France	7:42.16,2	+1:40.12,9
70	Luis Delgado	Chile	7:43.49,7	+1:41.46,4
71	Ernesto Figueroa	Mexico	8:03.13,3	+2:01.10,0
72	Will Foley	United States	8:06.02,9	+2:03.59,6
73	Maxime Danon	France	8:15.23,4	+2:13.20,1
73	Peter Schermann	Germany	8:15.23,4	+2:13.20,1
73	Kabelo Tshukudu	South Africa	8:15.23,4	+2:13.20,1
	Periklis Ilias	Greece	DNF	
	Pascal Nay	Switzerland	DNF	
	Martin Frey	Germany	DNF	
	Markus Kaufmann	Germany	DNF	
	Bruno Vitali	Switzerland	DNF	
	Jakob Hartmann	Germany	DNF	
	Marcus Sölter	Germany	DNF	
	Michael Sherwood	Australia	DNF	
	Thibaut Wantellet	France	DNF	
	Nino Schurter	Switzerland	DNF	
	Andrin Beeli	Switzerland	DNF	
	Gert Heyns	South Africa	DNF	
	Martino Tronconi	Italy	DNF	
	Marek Rauchfuss	Czech Republic	DNF	
	Xavier Lebrun	France	DNF	
	Andri Frischknecht	Switzerland	DNF	
	Simon Stiebjahn	Germany	DNF	
	Sascha Weber	Germany	DNF	
	Tony Longo	Italy	DNF	
	Robert Hobson	South Africa	DNF	
	Pirmin Eisenbarth	Germany	DNF	
	Alexey Medvedev	Russian Cycling Federation	DNF	
	Matouš Ulman	Czech Republic	DNF	
	Filip Adel	Czech Republic	DNF	
	Urs Huber	Switzerland	DNF	
	Julien Bély	France	DNF	
	Marco Rebagliati	Italy	DNF	
	Lars Forster	Switzerland	DNF	
	Marcos García	Spain	DNF	
	Daniele Mensi	Italy	DNF	
	Alex Wild	United States	DNF	
	Antoine Debons	Switzerland	DNF	
	Harry Aguirre	Chile	DNF	
	Tomáš Višňovský	Slovakia	DNF	
	Vinzent Dorn	Germany	DNF	
	Adrian Horchler	Germany	DNF	
	Johannes Közle	Germany	DNF	
	Tlotlo Selala	South Africa	DNF	
	Kristián Hynek	Czech Republic	DNF	
