= Petra Henzi =

Swiss mountain biker (born 1969)

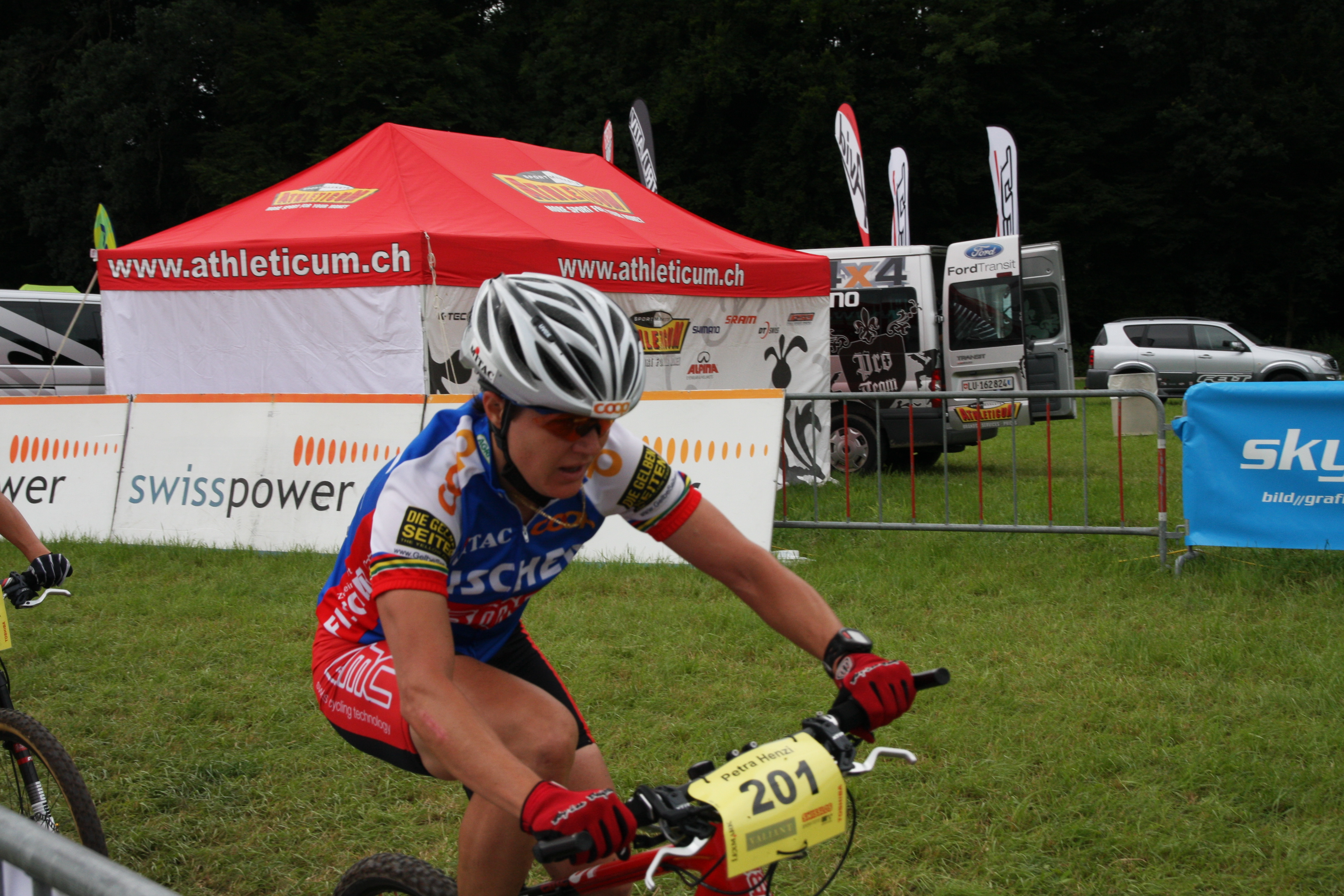

Personal information
- Born: 14 October 1969 (age 57) Küttigen, Aargau, Switzerland
- Height: 1.64 m (5 ft 5 in)
- Weight: 56 kg (123 lb)

Cycling career
- Sport: Cycling
- Current team: Retired
- Discipline: Mountain biking
- Role: Rider
- Rider type: Cross-country

Professional teams
- 2001–2002: Fischer-K2
- 2003–2010: Fischer-BMC
Medal record
Women's mountain biking
Representing Switzerland
World Championships
Gold medal – first place	2007 Verviers	Marathon
Silver medal – second place	2006 Oisans	Marathon
Bronze medal – third place	2005 Lillehammer	Marathon
Bronze medal – third place	2009 Graz	Marathon

Petra Henzi (born 14 October 1969) is a retired Swiss professional mountain biker. Throughout her sporting career, she has won numerous Swiss national championship titles, and more importantly, a total of four prestigious medals (one gold, one silver, and two bronze) in women's cross-country race at the UCI Mountain Bike World Championships. Henzi later represented her nation Switzerland, as a 38-year-old senior, at the 2008 Summer Olympics, and also rode professionally for more than five seasons on Fischer-BMC Team, before retiring from the sport in early 2010.

== Racing career ==
As a full-time member of Fischer-BMC team since her professional cycling debut in 2002, Henzi sought sporting headlines on the international scene at the 2005 UCI Mountain Bike World Championships in Livigno, Italy, where she claimed the bronze medal in the women's marathon race, adding the Swiss national championship title to her career resume in that same year.

A year later, Henzi continued to flourish her ample success in mountain biking, as she collected a Swiss national championship title in women's cyclo-cross, and a prestigious silver medal in the marathon race at the 2006 UCI World Championships in Oisans, France. With the sudden absence of three-time world and defending Olympic champion Gunn-Rita Dahle Flesjå of Norway due to a sustained stomach virus, Henzi managed to hold off a sprint cross-country race against Germany's Sabine Spitz for an elusive gold medal in the same distance at the 2007 UCI World Championships in Verviers, Belgium. Henzi's striking effort on her gold-medal success strongly guaranteed an automatic spot for her team at the Olympics.

Henzi qualified for the Swiss squad, along with her teammate and European junior champion Nathalie Schneitter, in the women's cross-country race at the 2008 Summer Olympics in Beijing by receiving one of the nation's two available berths for her team from the Union Cycliste Internationale (UCI), based on her best performance at the World Cup series and Mountain Biking World Rankings. She successfully completed a 4.8-km sturdy, treacherous cross-country course with a career-high, sixth-place effort in 1:48:41, narrowly missing out the Olympic podium by more than two seconds.

Shortly after the Olympics, Henzi established herself again as the top female cyclist by surpassing her teammate Esther Süss for another gold medal at the second and final stage of the Nissan UCI MTB World Cup in Ornans, France. Because of her continuous triumphs and a more profound dedication to the sport, Henzi was officially nominated to be the Swiss Sportswoman of the Year, but did not reach the final shortlist.

At the 2009 UCI World Championships in Graz, Austria, Henzi could not match a sterling ride with a bronze-medal effort in the women's cross-country race, trailing behind her rivals Spitz and Süss by almost three minutes.

== Career achievements ==
2005
1st Swiss MTB Championships (Cross-country), Champéry (SUI)
(bronze) UCI World Championships (Marathon), Livigno (ITA)
(bronze) UCI World Championships (Cross-country), Livigno (ITA)
2005
1st Swiss MTB Championships (Cyclo-cross), Meilen (SUI)
(silver) UCI World Championships (Marathon), Oisans (FRA)
2007
(gold) UCI World Championships (Marathon), Verviers (BEL)
2008
(gold) Stage 2, Nissan UCI World Cup, Ornans (FRA)
6th Olympic Games (Cross-country), Beijing (CHN)
2009
(bronze) UCI World Championships (Marathon), Graz (AUT)
2010
2nd Swiss MTB Championships (Marathon), Mendrisio (SUI)
