= Esther Süss =

Swiss mountain biker (born 1974)

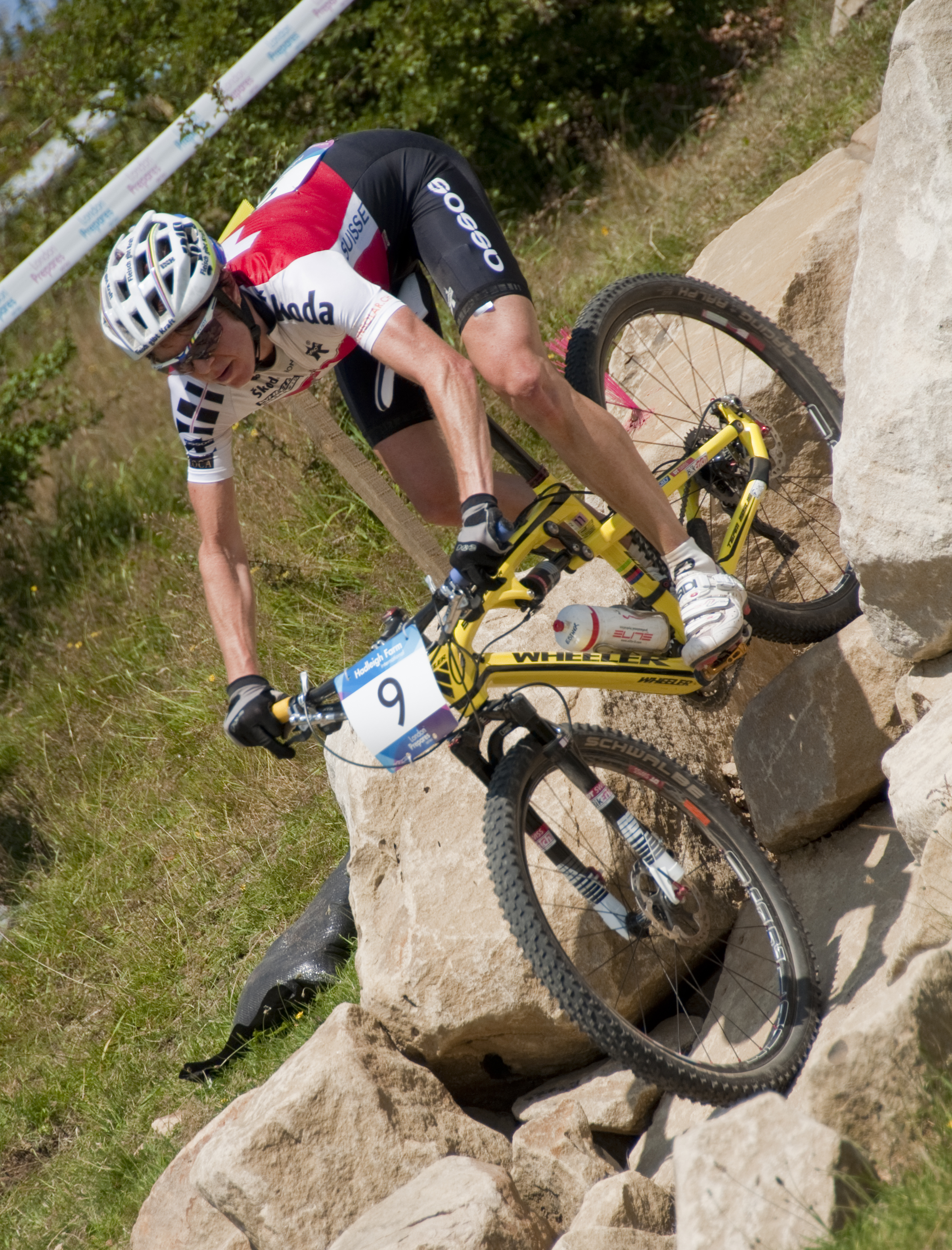

Medal record

Representing Switzerland

Women's Mountain bike marathon

World Championships
Gold medal – first place	2010 Sankt Wendel	Women's race
Silver medal – second place	2009 Graz/Stattegg	Women's race
Bronze medal – third place	2011 Montello	Women's race
Bronze medal – third place	2012 Ornans	Women's race

European Championships
Gold medal – first place	2008 Sankt Wendel	Women's race
Gold medal – first place	2010 Montebelluna	Women's race
Bronze medal – third place	2007 Albstadt	Women's race

Women's Mountain bike racing

European Championships
Silver medal – second place	2012 Moscow	Cross-country

Esther Süss (born 19 March 1974) is a Swiss cross-country mountain biker. At the 2012 Summer Olympics, she competed in the Women's cross-country at Hadleigh Farm, finishing in 5th place.

Süss raced the Absa Cape Epic in 2011 alongside Barti Bucher placing 1st in the Mixed Category. She came 1st again in 2012 in the Women's Category, this time with teammate Sally Bigham. Süss raced again with Bigham in 2014 and finished second, behind new champions Ariane Kleinhans and world champion Annika Langvad.

In March, 2017, Süss, riding with Sweden's Jennie Stenerhag, picked up her second Absa Cape Epic women's title.
