= 2012 UCI Mountain Bike Marathon World Championships =

- Venue: Ornans, France
- Date(s): 7 October 2012
- Events: 2

The 2012 UCI Mountain Bike Marathon World Championships was the 10th edition of the UCI Mountain Bike Marathon World Championships held in Ornans, France.

== Medal summary ==
Event	Gold		Silver		Bronze	
Men	Periklis Ilias; Greece	4:18:17	Moritz Milatz; Germany	+ 2:28	Kristian Hynek; Czech Republic	+ 2:37
Women	Annika Langvad; Denmark	3:52:23	Gunn-Rita Dahle Flesja; Norway	+ 0:44	Esther Süss; Switzerland	+ 1:41
