= 2011 UCI Mountain Bike Marathon World Championships =

- Venue: Montello, Italy
- Date: 26 June 2011
- Events: 2

The 2011 UCI Mountain Bike Marathon World Championships was the 9th edition of the UCI Mountain Bike Marathon World Championships held in Montello, Italy. The men's race was 115.7 kilometres (71.9 mi) while the women's race was 98.3 kilometres (61.1 mi).

== Medal summary ==
Event	Gold		Silver		Bronze	
Men	Christoph Sauser; Switzerland	4:24:48	Jaroslav Kulhavý; Czech Republic	+ 3:10	Mirko Celestino; Italy	+ 5:42
Women	Annika Langvad; Denmark	4:20:32	Sabine Spitz; Germany	+ 1:55	Esther Süss; Switzerland	+ 3:22

== Medal table ==
Rank	Nation	Gold	Silver	Bronze	Total
1	Switzerland	1	0	1	2
2	Denmark	1	0	0	1
3	Czech Republic	0	1	0	1
3	Germany	0	1	0	1
5	Italy	0	0	1	1
Totals (5 entries)		2	2	2	6
