= UCI Mountain Bike Marathon World Championships =

Long distance off-road bicycling annual world competition

The UCI Mountain Bike Marathon World Championships is the world championship event for marathon mountain bike races. Inaugurated by the Union Cycliste Internationale in 2003, the event is held annually in single classes for men and women. The 2003 event was organized as part of the UCI Mountain Bike & Trials World Championships. Subsequent marathon world championships, however, have been organised as a stand-alone event.

The UCI awards a gold medal and a rainbow jersey to the winner. Silver and bronze medals are awarded to the second and third place contestants. World champions wear their rainbow jersey until the following year's championship, but only in marathon events.

== Medalists ==
=== Men ===
Championships	Gold	Silver	Bronze
2003 Lugano	Thomas Frischknecht (SUI)	Bart Brentjens (NED)	Carsten Bresser (GER)
2004 Bad Goisern	Massimo de Bertolis (ITA)	Thomas Dietsch (FRA)	Bart Brentjens (NED)
2005 Lillehammer	Thomas Frischknecht (SUI)	Bart Brentjens (NED)	Dario Acquaroli (ITA)
2006 Oisans	Ralph Näf (SUI)	Hector Páez (COL)	Roel Paulissen (BEL)
2007 Verviers	Christoph Sauser (SUI)	Roel Paulissen (BEL)	Thomas Dietsch (FRA)
2008 Villabassa	Roel Paulissen (BEL)	Christoph Sauser (SUI)	Urs Huber (SUI)
2009 Graz/Stattegg	Roel Paulissen (BEL)	Alban Lakata (AUT)	Christoph Sauser (SUI)
2010 Sankt Wendel	Alban Lakata (AUT)	Mirko Celestino (ITA)	Burry Stander (RSA)
2011 Montello	Christoph Sauser (SUI)	Jaroslav Kulhavý (CZE)	Mirko Celestino (ITA)
2012 Ornans	Periklis Ilias (GRC)	Moritz Milatz (GER)	Kristián Hynek (CZE)
2013 Kirchberg	Christoph Sauser (SUI)	Alban Lakata (AUT)	Hector Páez (COL)
2014 Pietermaritzburg	Jaroslav Kulhavý (CZE)	Alban Lakata (AUT)	Christoph Sauser (SUI)
2015 Selva di Val Gardena	Alban Lakata (AUT)	Christoph Sauser (SUI)	Hector Páez (COL)
2016 Laissac	Tiago Ferreira (POR)	Alban Lakata (AUT)	Kristián Hynek (CZE)
2017 Singen	Alban Lakata (AUT)	Tiago Ferreira (POR)	Daniel Geismayr (AUT)
2018 Auronzo di Cadore	Henrique Avancini (BRA)	Daniel Geismayr (AUT)	Héctor Páez (COL)
2019 Grächen – St. Niklaus	Héctor Páez (COL)	Kristián Hynek (CZE)	Samuele Porro (ITA)
2020 Sakarya	Héctor Páez (COL)	Tiago Ferreira (POR)	Martin Stošek (CZE)
2021 Elba	Andreas Seewald (GER)	Diego Arias (COL)	José Dias (POR)
2022 Haderslev	Sam Gaze (NZL)	Andreas Seewald (GER)	Simon Andreassen (DEN)
2023 Glasgow	Henrique Avancini (BRA)	Martin Stošek (CZE)	Lukas Baum (GER)
2024 Snowshoe	Simon Andreassen (DEN)	Christopher Blevins (USA)	David Valero (ESP)
2025 Valais	Keegan Swenson (USA)	Samuele Porro (ITA)	Héctor Páez (COL)
2026 San Martino di Castrozza	Andreas Seewald (GER)	Gioele De Cosmo (ITA)	Jakob Dorigoni (ITA)

==== Medal count ====
Rank	Nation	Gold	Silver	Bronze	Total
1	Switzerland	6	2	3	11
2	Austria	3	5	1	9
3	Colombia	2	2	4	8
4	Germany	2	2	2	6
5	Belgium	2	1	1	4
6	Brazil	2	0	0	2
7	Italy	1	3	4	8
8	Czech Republic	1	3	3	7
9	Portugal	1	2	1	4
10	United States	1	1	0	2
11	Denmark	1	0	1	2
12	Greece	1	0	0	1
12	New Zealand	1	0	0	1
14	Netherlands	0	2	1	3
15	France	0	1	1	2
16	South Africa	0	0	1	1
16	Spain	0	0	1	1
Totals (17 entries)		24	24	24	72

=== Women ===
Championships	Gold	Silver	Bronze
2003 Lugano	Maja Włoszczowska (POL)	Magdalena Sadlecka (POL)	Sandra Klose (GER)
2004 Bad Goisern	Gunn-Rita Dahle Flesjå (NOR)	Irina Kalentieva (RUS)	Blaža Klemenčič (SLO)
2005 Lillehammer	Gunn-Rita Dahle Flesjå (NOR)	Blaža Klemenčič (SLO)	Petra Henzi (SUI)
2006 Oisans	Gunn-Rita Dahle Flesjå (NOR)	Petra Henzi (SUI)	Elsbeth van Rooy-Vink (NED)
2007 Verviers	Petra Henzi (SUI)	Sabine Spitz (GER)	Pia Sundstedt (FIN)
2008 Villabassa	Gunn-Rita Dahle Flesjå (NOR)	Sabine Spitz (GER)	Pia Sundstedt (FIN)
2009 Graz/Stattegg	Sabine Spitz (GER)	Esther Süss (SUI)	Petra Henzi (SUI)
2010 Sankt Wendel	Esther Süss (SUI)	Sabine Spitz (GER)	Annika Langvad (DEN)
2011 Montello	Annika Langvad (DEN)	Sabine Spitz (GER)	Esther Süss (SUI)
2012 Ornans	Annika Langvad (DEN)	Gunn-Rita Dahle Flesjå (NOR)	Esther Süss (SUI)
2013 Kirchberg	Gunn-Rita Dahle Flesjå (NOR)	Sally Bigham (GBR)	Esther Süss (SUI)
2014 Pietermaritzburg	Annika Langvad (DEN)	Sabine Spitz (GER)	Tereza Huříková (CZE)
2015 Selva di Val Gardena	Gunn-Rita Dahle Flesjå (NOR)	Annika Langvad (DEN)	Sabine Spitz (GER)
2016 Laissac	Jolanda Neff (SUI)	Sally Bigham (GBR)	Sabrina Enaux (FRA)
2017 Singen	Annika Langvad (DEN)	Sabine Spitz (GER)	Gunn-Rita Dahle Flesjå (NOR)
2018 Auronzo di Cadore	Annika Langvad (DEN)	Christina Kollmann (AUT)	Maja Włoszczowska (POL)
2019 Grächen – St. Niklaus	Pauline Ferrand-Prévot (FRA)	Blaža Klemenčič (SLO)	Robyn de Groot (RSA)
2020 Sakarya	Ramona Forchini (SUI)	Maja Włoszczowska (POL)	Ariane Lüthi (SUI)
2021 Elba	Mona Mitterwallner (AUT)	Maja Włoszczowska (POL)	Natalia Fischer (ESP)
2022 Haderslev	Pauline Ferrand-Prévot (FRA)	Annie Last (GBR)	Jolanda Neff (SUI)
2023 Glasgow	Mona Mitterwallner (AUT)	Candice Lill (RSA)	Adelheid Morath (GER)
2024 Snowshoe	Mona Mitterwallner (AUT)	Sina Frei (SUI)	Candice Lill (RSA)
2025 Valais	Kate Courtney (USA)	Anna Weinbeer (SUI)	Mona Mitterwallner (AUT)
2026 San Martino di Castrozza	Anna Weinbeer (SUI)	Claudia Peretti (ITA)	Mona Mitterwallner (AUT)

==== Medal count ====
Rank	Nation	Gold	Silver	Bronze	Total
1	Norway	6	1	1	8
2	Switzerland	5	4	7	16
3	Denmark	5	1	1	7
4	Austria	3	1	2	6
5	France	2	0	1	3
6	Germany	1	6	3	10
7	Poland	1	3	1	5
8	United States	1	0	0	1
9	Great Britain	0	3	0	3
10	Slovenia	0	2	1	3
11	South Africa	0	1	2	3
12	Italy	0	1	0	1
12	Russia	0	1	0	1
14	Finland	0	0	2	2
15	Czech Republic	0	0	1	1
15	Netherlands	0	0	1	1
15	Spain	0	0	1	1
Totals (17 entries)		24	24	24	72

== See also ==
- UCI Mountain Bike World Championships
