= Kristián Hynek =

Czech mountain bike racer

Personal information
- Born: 19 May 1980 (age 46)
- Height: 1.83 m (6 ft 0 in)
- Weight: 73 kg (161 lb)

Cycling career
- Sport: Cycling
- Discipline: Mountain bike
- Role: Rider
- Rider type: Marathon

Professional teams
- 2015–2017: Topeak Ergon Racing Team
- 2021–2022: Canyon Northwave MTB Team

Major wins
- Mountain Bike European Marathon Championships (2012) Cape Epic (2014)
Medal record
Representing Czech Republic
Men's Mountain bike marathon
World Championships
Silver medal – second place	2019 Grächen	Men's race
Bronze medal – third place	2012 Ornans	Men's race
Bronze medal – third place	2016 Laissac	Men's race
European Championships
Gold medal – first place	2012 Jablonné v Podještědí	Men's race
Bronze medal – third place	2013 Singen	Men's race
Bronze medal – third place	2016 Sigulda	Men's race

Kristián Hynek (born 19 May 1980) is a Czech former professional mountain bike racer.

A specialist in marathon races, he won several medals at the European and World Championships. He won the overall classification of the 2014 Cape Epic with Robert Mennen. He is also one of only three riders to have completed the Leadville 100 in under 6 hours, alongside Alban Lakata and Keegan Swenson.

Hynek retired in 2022, with his final race being the Malevil Cup.

== Major results ==
2009
1st Dubovac
2010
2nd Cross-country, National Championships
2012
1st Marathon, European Championships
1st Alpentour Trophy
2nd Langkawi International MTB Challenge
3rd Marathon, UCI World Championships
2013
1st Marathon, National Championships
1st Alpentour Trophy
UCI MTB Marathon Series

1st Südtirol
2nd Roc Laissagais

3rd Marathon, European Championships
4th Marathon, UCI World Championships
2014
1st Overall Cape Epic (with Robert Mennen)
UCI MTB Marathon Series

1st Val di Fassa Bike
1st Ornans

3rd Leadville 100
3rd Andalucía
2015
1st Andalucía
2nd Overall Cape Epic (with Alban Lakata)
2nd Leadville 100
2nd Czech Cup
3rd Overall Swiss Epic (with Alban Lakata)
2016
2nd Marathon, National Championships
2nd Andalucía
3rd Marathon, UCI World Championships
3rd Marathon, European Championships
2017
UCI MTB Marathon Series

1st Capoliveri Legend Cup
2nd Attekwas
3rd Tre Cime Di Lavaredo

5th Marathon, European Championships
2018
1st Marathon, National Championships
UCI MTB Marathon Series

1st Malevil Cup

1st Tankwa Trek
1st Vaud Engadin Bike Giro
2nd Overall Cape Epic (with Alban Lakata)
2nd La Leyenda del Dorado
2019
2nd Marathon, UCI World Championships
2nd Marathon, National Championships
2nd Südtirol Dolomiti Superbike
2020
3rd Marathon, National Championships
3rd Overall Swiss Epic (with Martin Stošek)
3rd HERO Dubai
2021
UCI MTB Marathon Series

3rd Sakarya
