= Mirko Celestino =

Italian cyclist (born 1974)

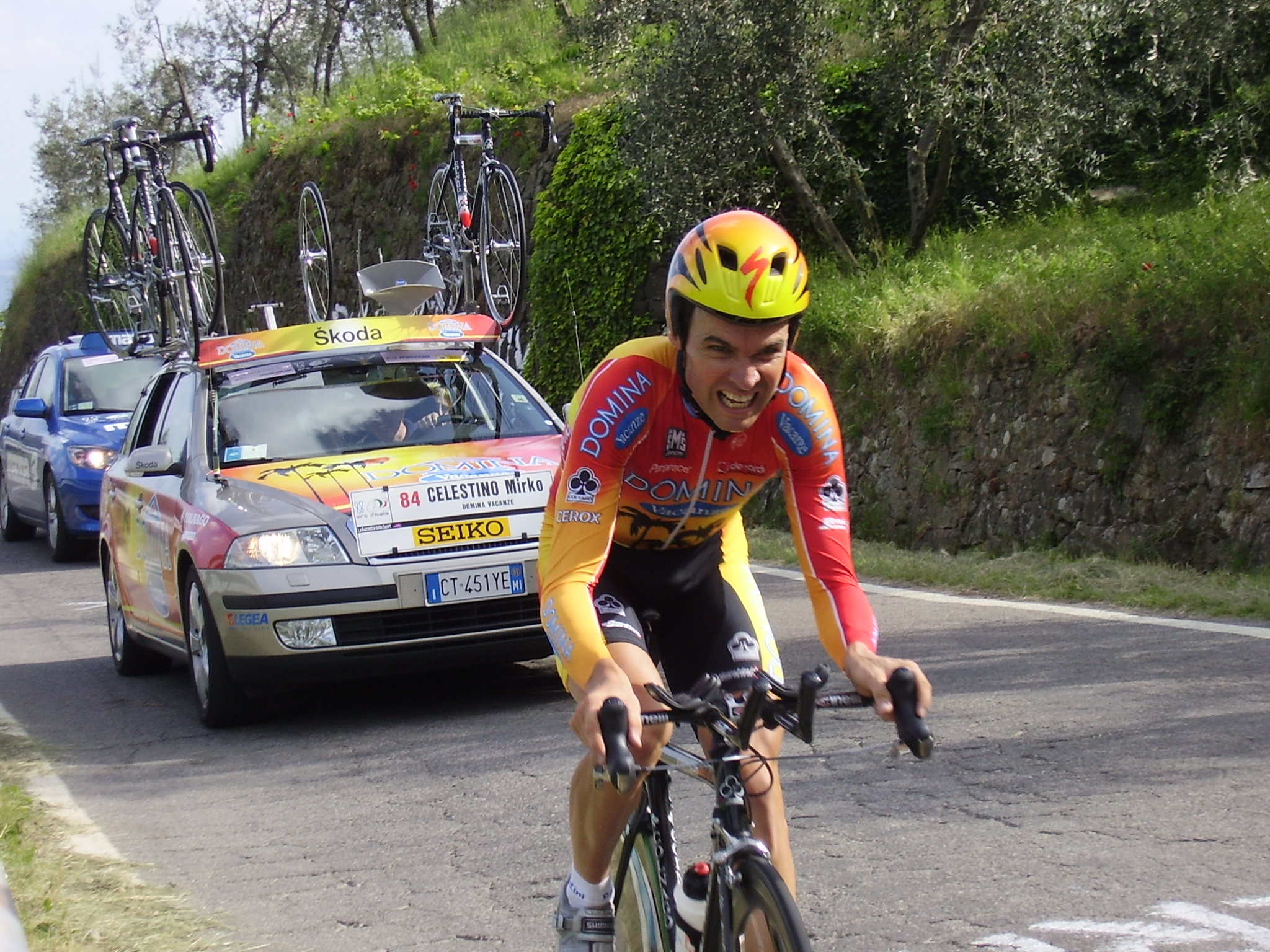
- Celestino at the 2005 Giro d'Italia

Personal information
- Full name: Mirko Celestino
- Born: 19 March 1974 (age 52) Albenga, Italy

Cycling career
- Sport: Cycling
- Disciplines: Road; Mountain biking
- Role: Rider

Professional teams
- 1996–2000: Team Polti
- 2001–2004: Saeco
- 2005: Domina Vacanze
- 2006–2007: Team Milram

Major wins
- Stage races Settimana Coppi e Bartali (2003) One-day races and Classics Giro di Lombardia (1999) HEW Cyclassics (1999) Milano–Torino (2001, 2003) Giro dell'Emilia (1998) Tre Valli Varesine (2001) Others Trittico Lombardo (1998)
Medal record
Representing Italy
Men's Mountain bike marathon
World Championships
Silver medal – second place	2010 Sankt Wendel	Men's race
Bronze medal – third place	2011 Montello	Men's race

Mirko Celestino (born 19 March 1974 in Albenga) is an Italian former professional road racing cyclist, specializing in the classic cycle races. His biggest career achievements to date include winning the monumental classic—Giro di Lombardia, the classic HEW Cyclassics and two-time winner of the semi-classic Milano–Torino. Since retiring from road racing, Celestino has been active in mountain bike racing, achieving a silver medal at the 2010 UCI Mountain Bike Marathon World Championships and a bronze medal at the 2011 UCI Mountain Bike Marathon World Championships.

== Career achievements ==
=== Major results ===
1995
1st Road race, European Under-23 Road Championships
1st GP Palio del Recioto
1996
4th Overall Regio-Tour
1997
2nd Coppa Placci
4th Overall Tour Méditerranéen
6th Milan–San Remo
7th Trofeo Laigueglia
10th Paris–Brussels
1998
1st Overall Regio-Tour

1st Stage 2

1st Giro dell'Emilia
2nd Giro del Lazio
2nd Coppa Placci
2nd Paris–Brussels
2nd Gran Premio di Chiasso
2nd Giro della Provincia di Reggio Calabria
2nd Coppa Ugo Agostoni
3rd E3 Prijs Vlaanderen
3rd GP Industria Artigianato e Commercio Carnaghese
3rd GP Villafranca de Ordizia
6th Tre Valli Varesine
7th Milano–Torino
8th Trofeo Laigueglia
1999
1st Giro di Lombardia
1st HEW Cyclassics Cup
1st Coppa Placci
2nd Japan Cup Cycle Road Race
3rd Memorial Gastone Nencini
5th Giro del Lazio
8th Trofeo Laigueglia
9th Giro dell'Emilia
9th Paris–Brussels
2000
2nd Trofeo Pantalica
3rd Giro dell'Emilia
3rd Giro del Lazio
6th GP Industria & Commercio di Prato
10th Overall Giro della Provincia di Lucca
2001
1st Milano–Torino
1st Tre Valli Varesine
1st Trofeo Laigueglia
6th Overall Settimana Internazionale di Coppi e Bartali
2002
2nd Overall Brixia Tour

1st Stage 2

4th Liège–Bastogne–Liège
4th Gran Premio di Chiasso
5th Trofeo Pantalica
6th Giro di Toscana
6th Trofeo Laigueglia
7th GP Città di Camaiore
8th Coppa Sabatini
2003
1st Overall Settimana Internazionale di Coppi e Bartali
1st Milano–Torino
2nd Milan–San Remo
2nd Gran Premio di Chiasso
2nd Giro del Lazio
3rd Overall Brixia Tour
3rd Coppa Sabatini
5th Rund um den Henninger Turm
5th HEW Cyclassics
5th Trofeo Melinda
7th GP de Fourmies
7th Trofeo Laigueglia
9th Coppa Placci
9th Overall Tour Méditerranéen
2004
2nd Overall Settimana Internazionale di Coppi e Bartali

1st Stage 2

3rd GP Industria & Commercio di Prato
7th Tour du Haut Var
7th Gran Premio di Chiasso
9th Coppa Placci
9th Amstel Gold Race
2005
2nd Milano–Torino
3rd Amstel Gold Race
3rd Giro dell'Emilia
3rd Coppa Sabatini
4th Rund um den Henninger Turm
4th GP Nobili Rubinetterie
8th Liège–Bastogne–Liège
9th Züri Metzgete
10th Overall Three Days of Bruges–De Panne
2006
2nd Road race, National Road Championships
3rd GP Città di Camaiore
3rd Milano–Torino
4th Coppa Ugo Agostoni
6th Clásica de San Sebastián
6th Giro del Lazio
6th Memorial Marco Pantani
7th Trofeo Laigueglia

=== Grand Tour general classification results timeline ===
Grand Tour	1996	1997	1998	1999	2000	2001	2002	2003	2004	2005	2006
Giro d'Italia	—	DNF	—	74	—	—	—	—	—	34	—
Tour de France	—	—	—	—	—	—	—	—	DNF	—	DNF
Vuelta a España	73	—	—	—	—	—	—	—	—	—	—

Legend
DSQ	Disqualified
DNF	Did not finish
