= 2010 UCI Mountain Bike Marathon World Championships =

- Venue: Sankt Wendel, Germany
- Date: 8 August 2010
- Events: 2

The 2010 UCI Mountain Bike Marathon World Championships was the 8th edition of the UCI Mountain Bike Marathon World Championships held in Sankt Wendel, Germany. Both the men's and women's races were 107.93 kilometres (67.06 mi).

== Medal summary ==
Event	Gold		Silver		Bronze	
Men	Alban Lakata; Austria	3:49:55.3	Mirko Celestino; Italy	+ 5.0	Burry Stander; South Africa	+ 5.5
Women	Esther Süss; Switzerland	4:33:46.8	Sabine Spitz; Germany	+ 1:56.7	Annika Langvad; Denmark	+ 2:53.9

== Medal table ==
Rank	Nation	Gold	Silver	Bronze	Total
1	Austria	1	0	0	1
1	Switzerland	1	0	0	1
3	Germany	0	1	0	1
3	Italy	0	1	0	1
5	Denmark	0	0	1	1
5	South Africa	0	0	1	1
Totals (6 entries)		2	2	2	6
