= Massimo de Bertolis =

Italian athlete

Personal information
- Born: 28 April 1975 (age 51) Feltre, Italy

Cycling career
- Sport: Cycling
- Discipline: Cross-country
- Role: Rider
- Rider type: Marathon
Medal record
Representing Italy
Mountain bike marathon
World Championships
Gold medal – first place	2004 Bad Goisern	Men's race

Massimo de Bertolis (born 28 April 1975) is an Italian former professional cross-country mountain biker. He most notably won the 2004 UCI Mountain Bike Marathon World Championships in Bad Goisern, Austria.

He also won the first round of the 2005 UCI XCM World Cup and finished 5th overall. In the 2007 edition, he won the second round in Villabassa and this time finished second overall.
