= Simon Andreassen =

Danish cyclist (born 1997)

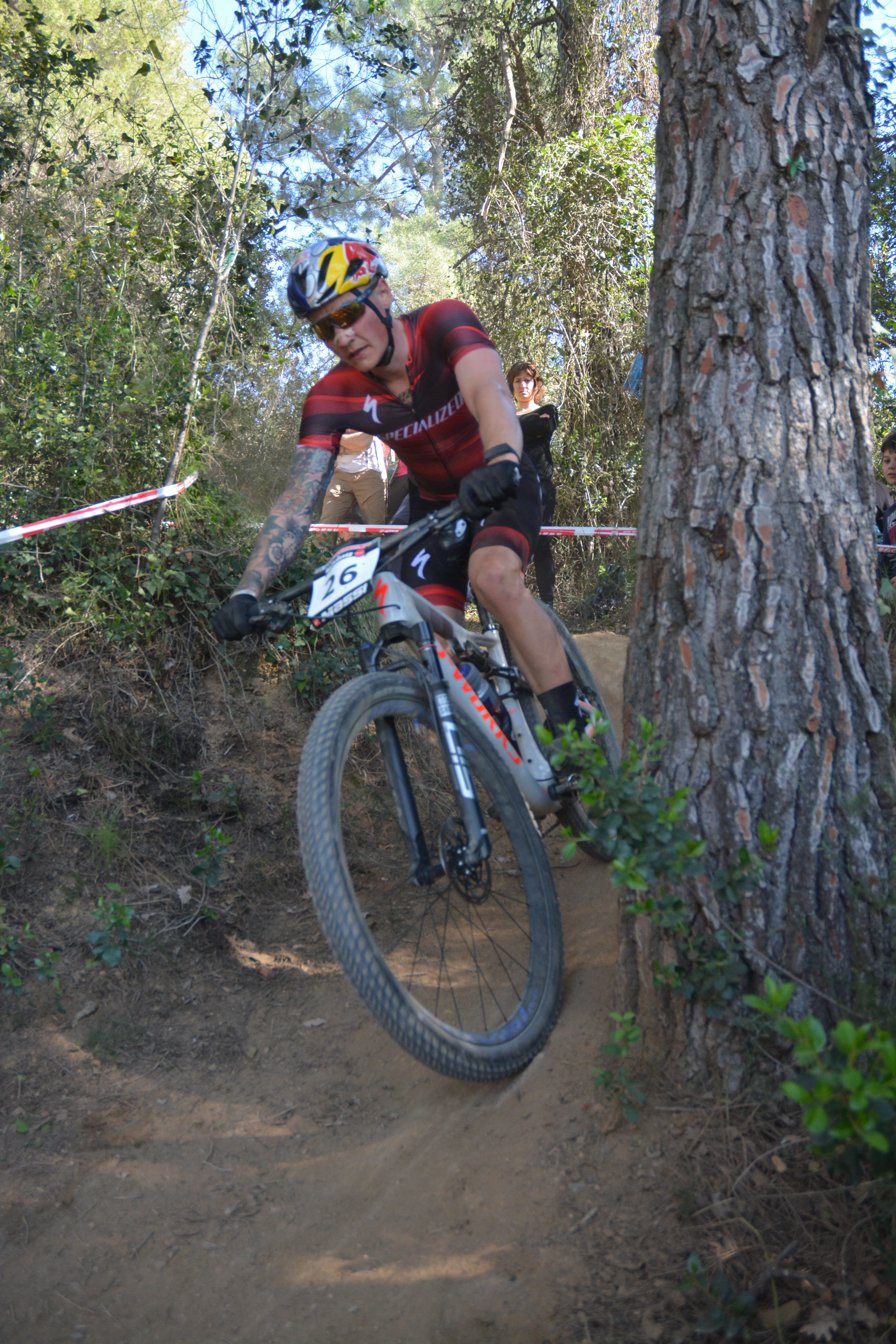
- Andreassen in 2020

Personal information
- Full name: Simon Lien Andreassen
- Born: 30 September 1997 (age 29) Odense, Denmark
- Height: 1.77 m (5 ft 10 in)
- Weight: 68 kg (150 lb)

Cycling career
- Sport: Cycling
- Disciplines: Cross-Country; Mountain bike
- Role: Rider

Major wins
- Cyclo-cross National Championships (2016, 2017, 2022) Mountain bike World Marathon Championships (2024) National XC Championships (2016, 2018, 2020, 2021) XC World Cup 2 individual wins (2020, 2024)
Medal record
Representing Denmark
Men's mountain bike racing
World Championships
Gold medal – first place	2014 Lillehammer-Hafjell	Junior cross-country
Gold medal – first place	2015 Vallnord	Junior cross-country
Silver medal – second place	2015 Vallnord	Team relay
Silver medal – second place	2017 Cairns	Team relay
Bronze medal – third place	2018 Lenzerheide	Team relay
European Championships
Gold medal – first place	2024 Cheile Grădiștei	Cross-country short track
Silver medal – second place	2024 Cheile Grădiștei	Cross-country
Men's cross-country marathon
World Championships
Gold medal – first place	2024 Snowshoe	Men's
Bronze medal – third place	2022 Haderslev	Men's

Simon Lien Andreassen (born 30 September 1997) is a Danish male cyclist competing in cyclo-cross and mountainbike. He competed in the men's under-23 event at the 2016 UCI Cyclo-cross World Championships in Heusden-Zolder.

== Major results ==
=== Cyclo-cross ===
2013–2014
1st National Junior Championships
2014–2015
1st UCI World Junior Championships
1st National Junior Championships
1st Junior Helsingør
UCI Junior World Cup

3rd Namur

5th UEC European Junior Championships
2015–2016
1st National Championships
2nd Helsingør
3rd Stockholm
2016–2017
1st National Championships
2021–2022
1st National Championships

=== Mountain bike ===
2014
1st Cross-country, UCI World Junior Championships
1st Cross-country, UEC European Junior Championships
1st Cross-country, National Junior Championships
2015
UCI World Championships

1st Junior cross-country
2nd Team relay

1st Cross-country, UEC European Junior Championships
1st Cross-country, National Junior Championships
2016
1st Cross-country, National Championships
2017
2nd Team relay, UCI World Championships
3rd Cross-country, UEC European Under-23 Championships
3rd Cross-country, National Championships
2018
1st Marathon, National Championships
3rd Team relay, UCI World Championships
2020
1st Cross-country, National Championships
UCI XCO World Cup

1st Nové Město I

3rd Cross-country, UCI World E-MTB Championships
2021
National Championships

1st Cross-country
1st Marathon

2022
3rd Marathon, UCI World Championships
2023
2nd Cross-country, National Championships
2024
1st Marathon, UCI World Championships
UEC European Championships

1st Short track
2nd Cross-country

UCI XCO World Cup

1st Araxá
3rd Les Gets

2025
XCO French Cup

1st Marseille–Luminy

3rd Cross-country, UEC European Championships
