= 2019 La Flèche Wallonne Femmes =

2019 UCI Women's World Tour, race 8 of 23
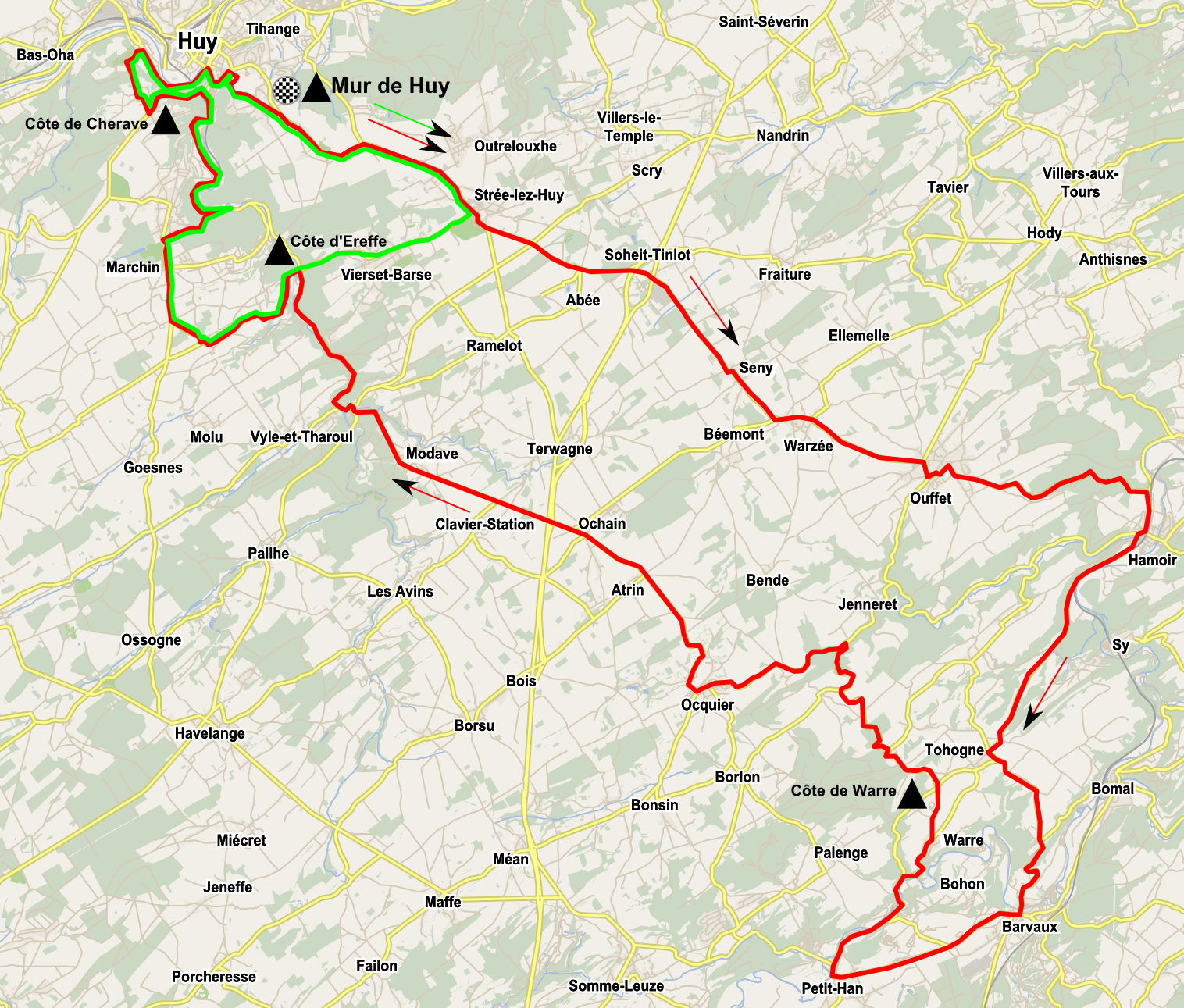

Race details
- Dates: 24 April 2019
- Stages: 1
- Distance: 118.5 km (73.6 mi)
- Winning time: 3h 17' 04"

Results
	Winner	Anna van der Breggen (NED)	(Boels–Dolmans)
	Second	Annemiek van Vleuten (NED)	(Mitchelton–Scott)
	Third	Annika Langvad (DEN)	(Boels–Dolmans)

Youtube race summary

The 22nd running of the women's Flèche wallonne was held on 24 April 2019. The race started and finished in Huy. The route featured seven categorized climbs, including two ascents of the Mur de Huy. The finish line was on the top of the final ascent of the Mur. It was won for the fifth consecutive time by Anna van der Breggen.

== Route ==
The race started and finished in Huy, following the same route as the 2018 race. The final 30 km loop was covered twice, totalling 118.5 km.

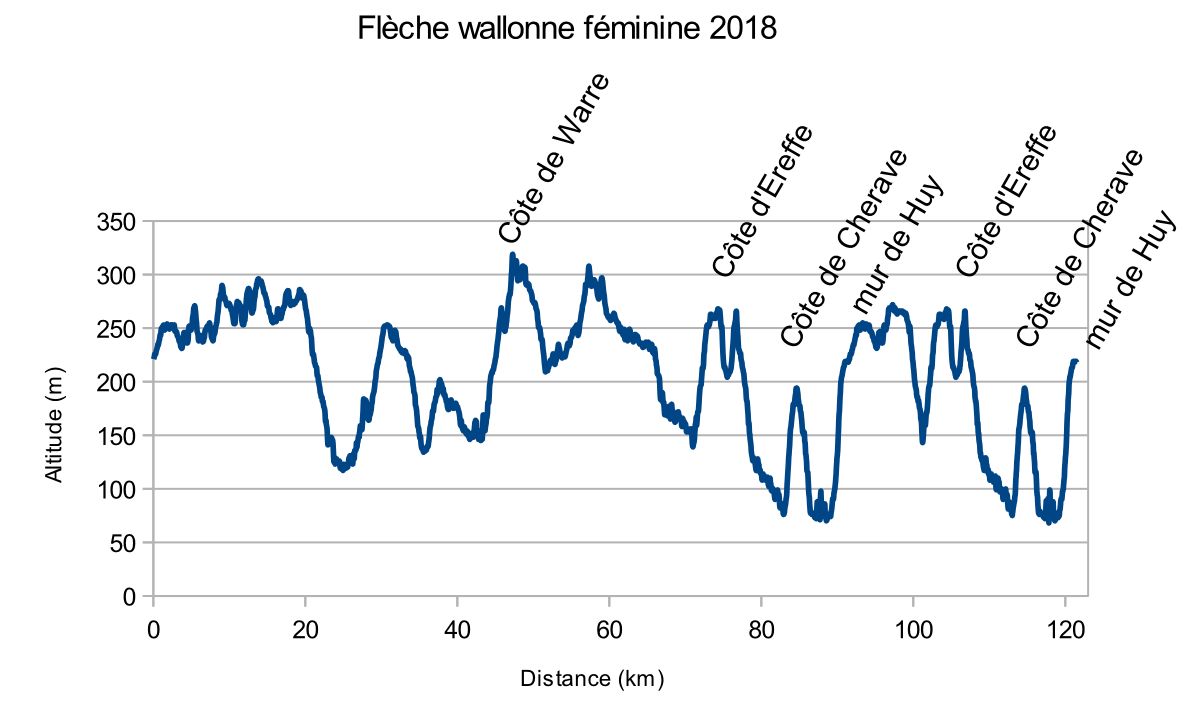
Race profile

There were 7 categorised climbs:

- 45.5 km: Côte de Warre – 2.2 km climb at 4.9%
- 73 km: Côte d'Ereffe – 2.1 km climb at 5%
- 83.5 km: Côte de Cherave – 1.3 km climb at 8.1%
- 89.5 km: Mur de Huy – 1.3 km climb at 9.6%
- 102 km: Côte d'Ereffe – 2.1 km climb at 5%
- 112.5 km: Côte de Cherave – 1.3 km climb at 8.1%
- 118.5 km: Mur de Huy – 1.3 km climb at 9.6%

== Teams ==
Twenty-four teams participated in the race. Each team had a maximum of six riders:

Professional women's teams

- Alé–Cipollini
- Aromitalia–Basso Bikes–Vaiano
- Astana
- Biehler Pro Cycling
- BTC City Ljubljana
- Canyon//SRAM
- Doltcini–Van Eyck Sport
- Drops
- Hitec Products–Birk Sport
- Lotto–Soudal Ladies
- Movistar Team
- Team Sunweb
- Tibco–Silicon Valley Bank
- WNT–Rotor Pro Cycling
- Bigla Pro Cycling
- Boels–Dolmans
- CCC - Liv
- FDJ Nouvelle-Aquitaine Futuroscope
- Health Mate–Cyclelive Team
- Mitchelton–Scott
- Parkhotel Valkenburg
- Team Virtu Cycling
- Trek–Segafredo
- Valcar–Cylance

== Result ==
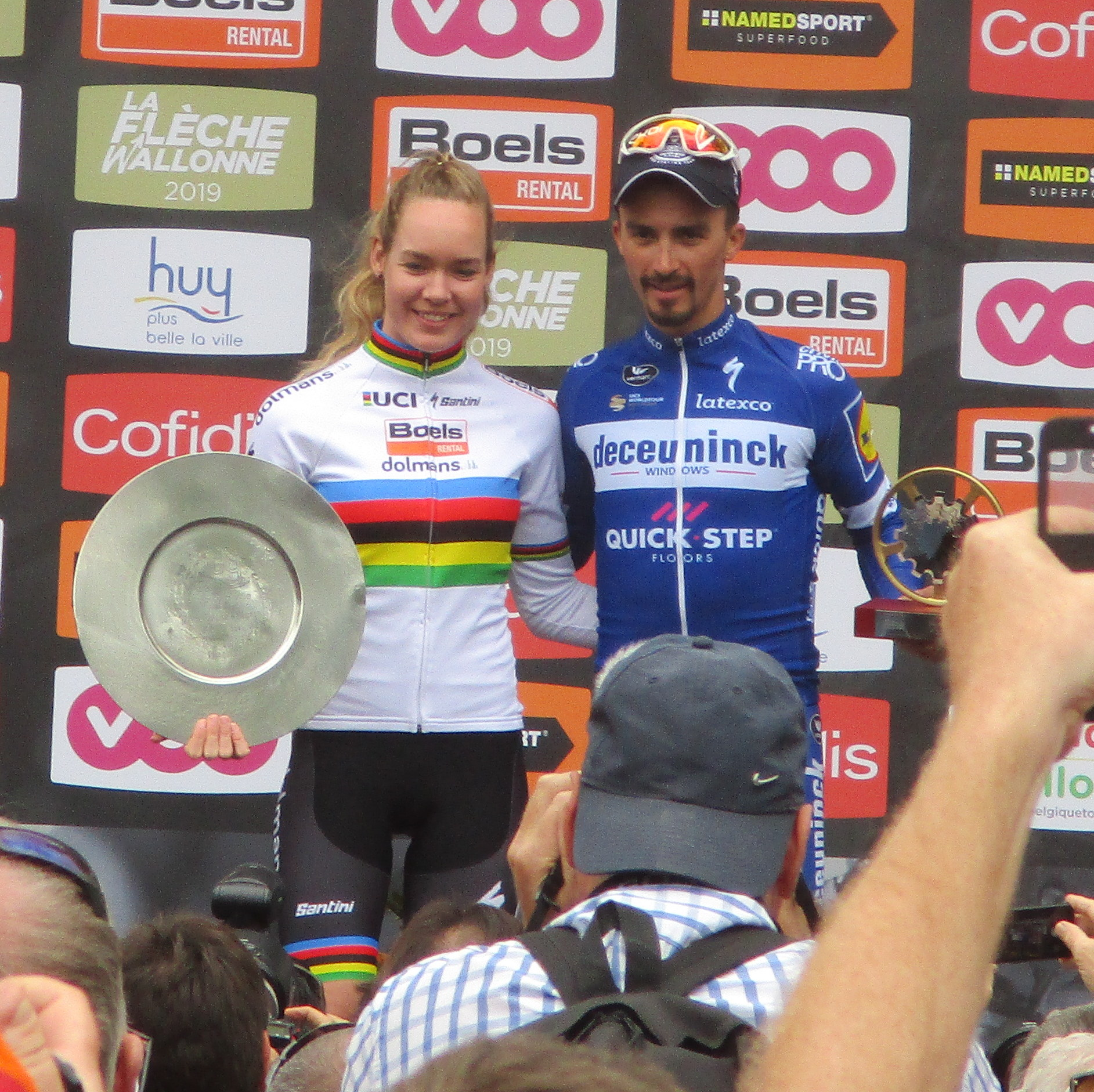
Winners of the race.

Final general classification

Rank	Rider	Team	Time
1	Anna van der Breggen (NED)	Boels–Dolmans	3h 17' 04"
2	Annemiek van Vleuten (NED)	Mitchelton–Scott	+ 1"
3	Annika Langvad (DEN)	Boels–Dolmans	+ 4"
4	Marianne Vos (NED)	CCC - Liv	+ 14"
5	Demi Vollering (NED)	Parkhotel Valkenburg	+ 16"
6	Katarzyna Niewiadoma (POL)	Canyon//SRAM	+ 17"
7	Ashleigh Moolman (RSA)	CCC - Liv	+ 20"
8	Cecilie Uttrup Ludwig (DEN)	Bigla Pro Cycling	+ 23"
9	Brodie Chapman (AUS)	Tibco–Silicon Valley Bank	+ 26"
10	Mavi García (ESP)	Movistar Team	+ 33"

== See also ==
- 2019 in women's road cycling
