= 2022 UCI Mountain Bike Marathon World Championships =

- Venue: Haderslev, Denmark
- Date(s): 17 September 2022
- Events: 2

The 2022 UCI Mountain Bike Marathon World Championships took place in Haderslev, Denmark on 17 September 2022. It was the 20th edition of the UCI Mountain Bike Marathon World Championships.

== Medal summary ==
Event	Gold		Silver		Bronze	
Men	Sam Gaze; New Zealand	4:16.51	Andreas Seewald; Germany	4:17:07	Simon Andreassen; Denmark	4:17:48
Women	Pauline Ferrand-Prévot; France	3:36.58	Annie Last; Great Britain	3:36.58	Jolanda Neff; Switzerland	3:37.00
