= Annika Langvad =

Danish cyclist (born 1984)

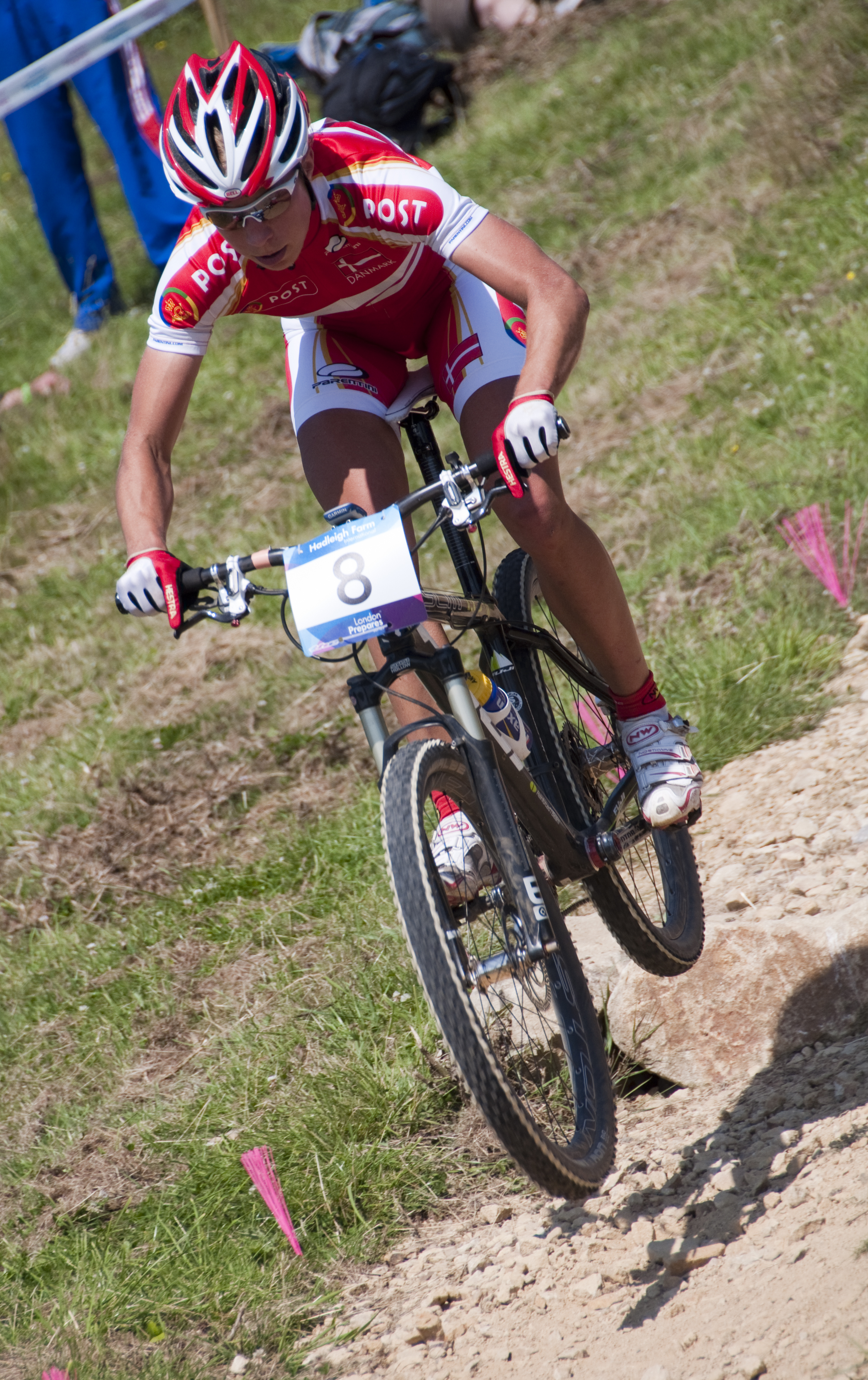
- Langvad in 2011

Personal information
- Full name: Annika Langvad
- Born: 22 March 1984 (age 42) Silkeborg, Denmark

Cycling career
- Sport: Cycling
- Current team: Specialized Racing
- Disciplines: Mountain bike racing; Road
- Role: Rider
- Rider type: Cross-country

Professional teams
- 2011–2012: Fujibikes Rockets (MTB)
- 2013: Davinci–Specialized (MTB)
- 2014–: Specialized Racing (MTB)
- 2019: Boels–Dolmans (road)

Major wins
- Cyclo-cross National Championships (2011, 2014, 2015) Mountain bike World XC Championships (2016) World Marathon Championships (2011, 2012, 2014, 2017, 2018) National XC Championships (2009–2018, 2020) XC World Cup 6 individual wins (2015–2018) Cape Epic (2014, 2015, 2016, 2018, 2019, 2025) Road One-day races and Classics National Road Race Championships (2010) National Time Trial Championships (2010, 2011, 2013)
Medal record
Women's mountain bike racing
Representing Denmark
World Championships
Gold medal – first place	2016 Nove Mesto	Cross-country
Silver medal – second place	2015 Vallnord	Team relay
Silver medal – second place	2017 Cairns	Team relay
Silver medal – second place	2018 Lenzerheide	Cross-country
Bronze medal – third place	2018 Lenzerheide	Team relay
European Championships
Silver medal – second place	2016 Huskvarna	Cross-country
Women's Mountain bike marathon
World Championships
Gold medal – first place	2011 Montello	Women's race
Gold medal – first place	2012 Ornans	Women's race
Gold medal – first place	2014 Pietermaritzburg	Women's race
Gold medal – first place	2017 Singen	Women's race
Gold medal – first place	2018 Auronzo di Cadore	Women's race
Silver medal – second place	2015 Selva di Val Gardena	Women's race
Bronze medal – third place	2010 Sankt Wendel	Women's race

Annika Langvad (born 22 March 1984) is a Danish racing cyclist, who riding for Specialized Racing in cross-country mountain bike racing. Langvad is a five-time World Champion in mountain bike racing, winning four titles in mountain bike marathon and one in cross-country.

== Career ==
From 2014, Langvad and her Swiss Spur-Specialized teammate Ariane Kleinhans won the women's category of Absa Cape Epic three consecutive times. In 2015, they won by a significant margin of an hour and 18 minutes. Langvad won the Cape Epic a total of six times during her career. Also in 2015, Langvad won the Leadville 100, becoming the first woman to ride that race under 7 hours. In 2016, Langvad won the world championship in Women's cross-country and also placed second in the UCI World Cup rankings for Cross Country, only 24 points behind the leader, Catharine Pendrel. She went on to finish as runner-up in the cross-country World Cup standings a second time in 2018. On the road, she won the Danish road race championship in 2010, was a three-time Danish time trial champion, and finished sixth in the 2013 individual time trial World Championship. She rode the 2019 season on the road with Boels–Dolmans, during which she finished second at Strade Bianche, fourth at the Amstel Gold Race, and third at Flèche Wallonne. On 9 October 2020, she announced her retirement.

== Major results ==
=== Cyclo-cross ===
2010–2011
1st National Championships
2013–2014
1st National Championships
2014–2015
1st National Championships
3rd Kronborg

=== Gravel ===
2023
UCI World Series

2nd Halmstad

=== Road ===
2010
National Championships

1st Road race
1st Time trial

2011
1st Time trial, National Championships
2013
1st Time trial, National Championships
6th UCI Road World Championships – Women's time trial
2018
3rd Time trial, National Championships
2019
2nd Strade Bianche
3rd La Flèche Wallonne
4th Amstel Gold Race

=== Mountain bike ===
2009
1st Cross-country, National Championships
2010
1st Cross-country, National Championships
3rd Marathon, UCI World Championships
2011
1st Marathon, UCI World Championships
1st Cross-country, National Championships
2012
1st Marathon, UCI World Championships
1st Cross-country, National Championships
2013
1st Cross-country, National Championships
2014
1st Marathon, UCI World Championships
1st Cross-country, National Championships
1st Overall Cape Epic (with Ariane Lüthi)
1st Overall Swiss Epic (with Ariane Kleinhans)
UCI XCO World Cup

3rd Windham

2015
1st Cross-country, National Championships
1st Overall Cape Epic (with Ariane Lüthi)
2nd Marathon, UCI World Championships
2nd Overall Swiss Epic (with Ariane Lüthi)
3rd Overall UCI XCO World Cup

1st Val di Sole
3rd Windham

2016
1st Cross-country, UCI World Championships
1st Cross-country, National Championships
1st Overall Cape Epic (with Ariane Lüthi)
1st Roc d'Azur
2nd Overall UCI XCO World Cup

1st Cairns
1st Albstadt
2nd Lenzerheide

2017
1st Marathon, UCI World Championships
1st Cross-country, National Championships
2nd Overall UCI XCO World Cup

1st Nové Město
2nd Vallnord

UCI Marathon Series

1st Attakwas Extreme
1st Roc d'Azur

2018
1st Marathon, UCI World Championships
1st Cross-country, National Championships
1st Marathon, National Championships
1st Overall Cape Epic (with Kate Courtney)
2nd Cross-country, UCI World Championships
2nd Overall UCI XCO World Cup

1st Stellenbosch
1st Nové Město
2nd Mont-Sainte-Anne
3rd La Bresse

UCI XCC World Cup

1st Albstadt
1st Nové Město
1st Val di Sole
1st Mont-Sainte-Anne
1st La Bresse
2nd Vallnord

2019
1st Overall Cape Epic (with Anna van der Breggen)
2020
1st Cross-country, National Championships
1st Marathon, National Championships
1st Overall Swiss Epic (with Haley Batten)
2025
1st Overall Cape Epic (with Sofía Gómez Villafane)
