= Lukas Baum =

German cross-country mountain biker (born 1995)

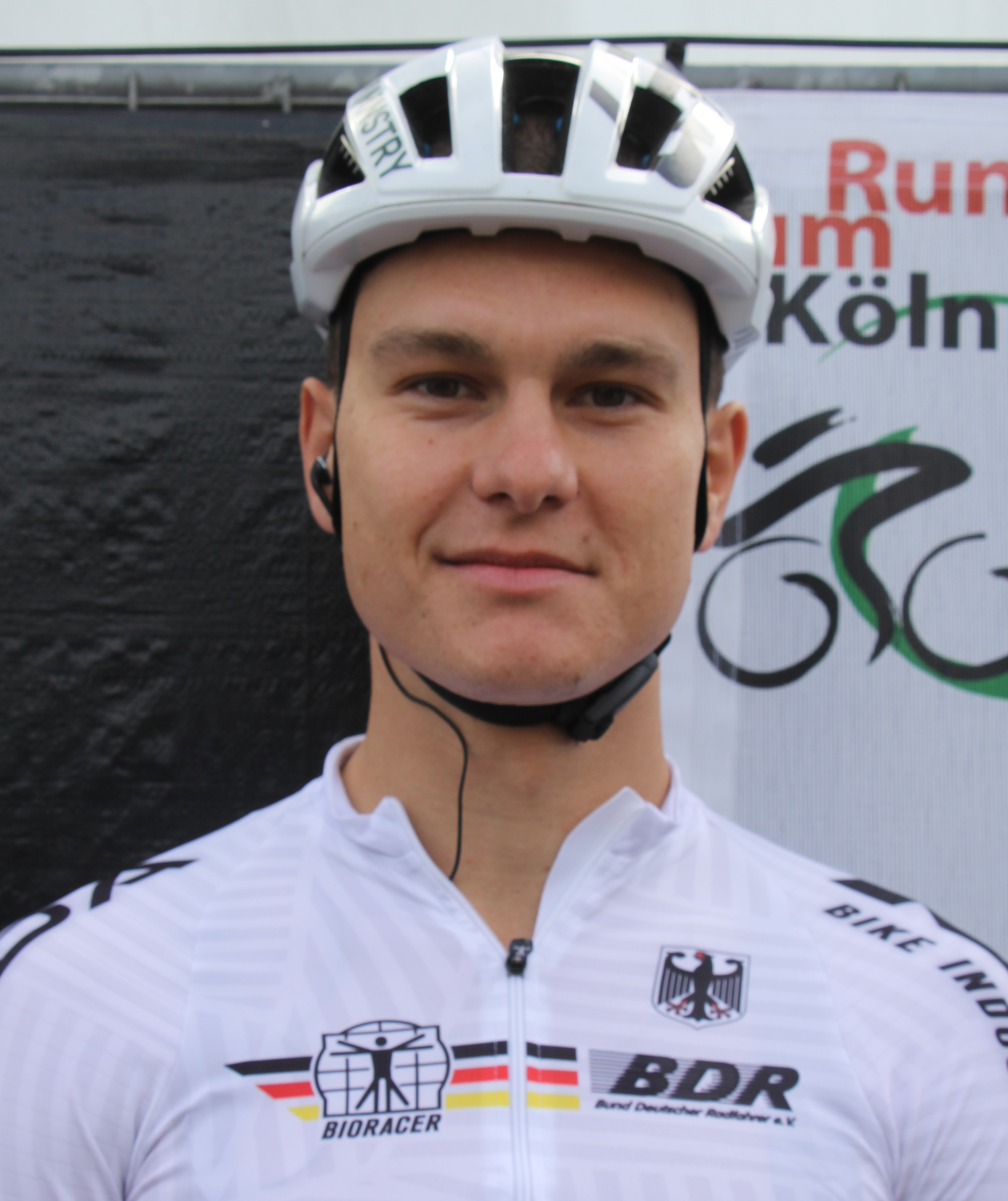
- Baum in 2024

Personal information
- Born: 28 February 1995 (age 31) Speyer, Germany

Cycling career
- Sport: Cycling
- Current team: Orbea Leatt Speed Company
- Disciplines: Cross-country; Gravel; Road
- Role: Rider

Professional teams
- 2014–2016: Rad-Net Rose Team
- 2017: Team Lotto–Kern Haus

Major wins
- Mountain bike European Marathon Championships (2024) Cape Epic (2022)
Medal record
Representing Germany
Men's mountain bike racing
World Championships
Gold medal – first place	2013 Pietermaritzburg	Junior cross-country
Men's cross-country marathon
World Championships
Bronze medal – third place	2023 Glentress Forest	Men's race
European Championships
Gold medal – first place	2024 Viborg	Men's race

Lukas Baum (born 28 February 1995) is a German cross-country mountain biker. In 2022, he won the Cape Epic with Georg Egger. Two years later, he became the European Cross-country Marathon Champion, after winning the bronze medal at the UCI World Championships the previous year.

== Major results ==
=== Mountain bike ===
2013
1st Cross-country, UCI World Junior Championships
1st Cross-country, UEC European Junior Championships
2022
1st Overall Cape Epic (with Georg Egger)
2023
2nd Overall Cape Epic (with Georg Egger)
3rd Marathon, UCI World Championships
2024
1st Marathon, UEC European Championships

=== Gravel ===
2023
1st National Championships
1st Overall Migration Gravel Race
1st Stages 1 & 4
2024
1st Stages 2 & 3 Migration Gravel Race
2nd Safari Gravel Race
2025
UCI World Series

2nd Sardegna

=== Cyclo-cross ===
2016–2017
1st National Under-23 Championships

=== Road ===
2015
1st Stage 4 Oder-Rundfahrt
