= David Valero =

Spanish cyclist

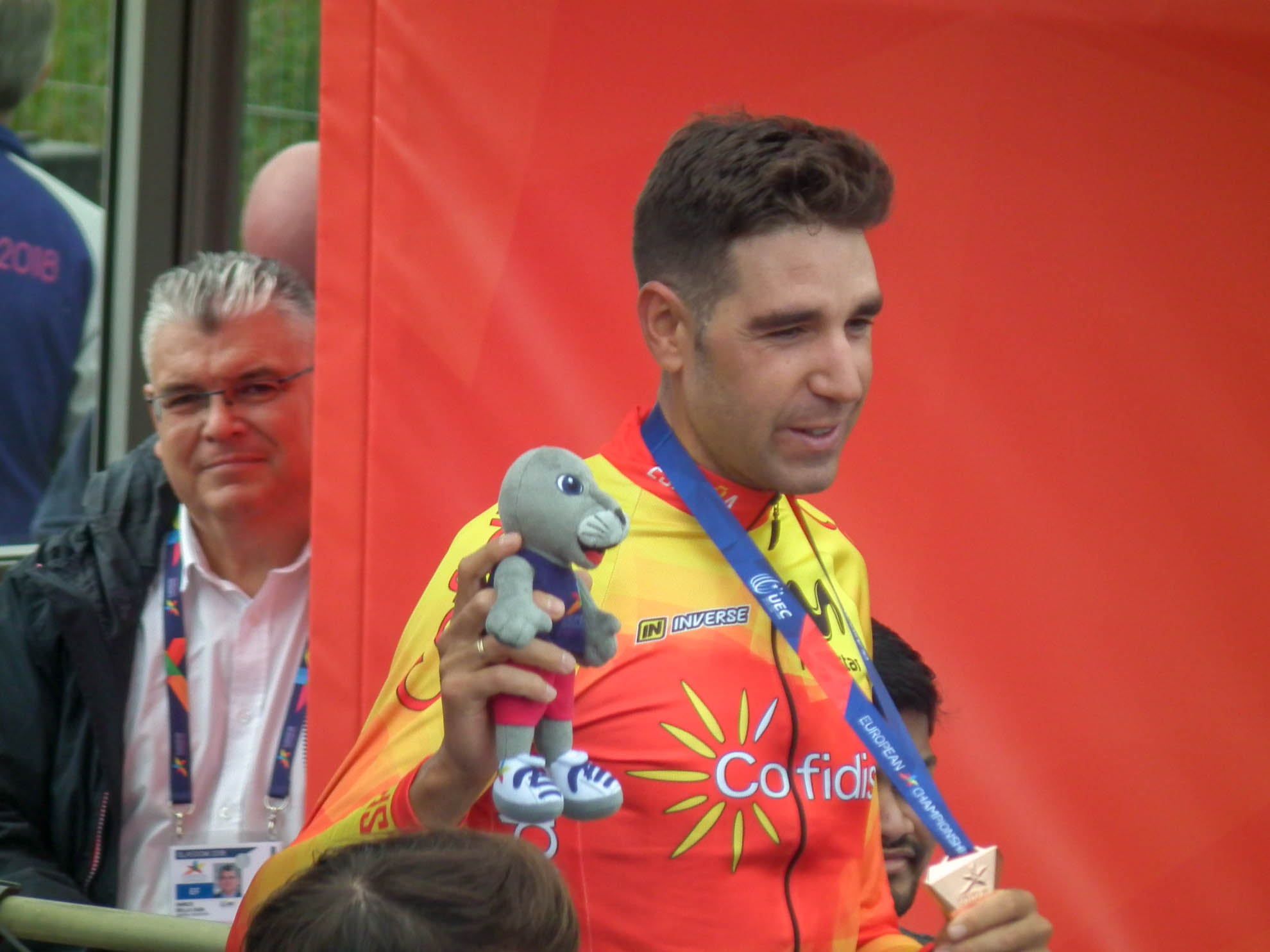
- Valero in 2018

Personal information
- Full name: David Valero Serrano
- Born: 27 December 1988 (age 37) Baza, Spain

Cycling career
- Sport: Cycling
- Discipline: Mountain
- Role: Rider
- Rider type: Cross-country

Major wins
- Mountain bike National XC Championships (2015, 2017–2025) XC World Cup 1 individual win (2022)
Medal record
Representing Spain
Men's mountain bike racing
Olympic Games
| Bronze medal – third place | 2020 Tokyo | Cross-country |
World Championships
| Silver medal – second place | 2022 Les Gets | Cross-country |
European Championships
| Silver medal – second place | 2024 Viborg | Cross-country marathon |
| Bronze medal – third place | 2018 Glasgow | Cross-country |
Men's cross-country marathon
UCI Mountain Bike Marathon World Championships
| Bronze medal – third place | 2024 Snowshoe | Men's |

David Valero Serrano (born 27 December 1988 in Baza, Granada) is a Spanish cross-country mountain biker. At the 2020 Summer Olympics, he won the bronze medal in the Men's cross-country event. Previously, at the 2016 Summer Olympics, he finished 9th in the Men's cross-country event. He was on the start list for the 2018 Cross-country European Championship and he finished 3rd.

== Major results ==
2015
1st Cross-country, National Championships
2016
2nd Cross-country, National Championships
2017
1st Cross-country, National Championships
UCI XCO World Cup

2nd Nové Město

2018
1st Cross-country, National Championships
3rd Cross-country, European Championships
2019
1st Cross-country, National Championships
2020
1st Cross-country, National Championships
2021
1st Cross-country, National Championships
3rd Cross-country, Olympic Games
2022
National Championships

1st Cross-country
1st Short track

UCI XCO World Cup

1st Snowshoe
2nd Vallnord
3rd Mont-Sainte-Anne

Copa Catalana Internacional

1st Vallnord

2nd Cross-country, UCI World Championships
2023
National Championships

1st Cross-country
1st Short track

5th Cross-country, UEC European Championships
2024
1st Cross-country, National Championships
2nd Marathon, UEC European Championships
3rd Marathon, UCI World Championships
2025
National Championships

1st Cross-country
1st Short track

4th Marathon, UCI World Championships
2026
2nd Gravel, National Championships
