= Sally Bigham =

British mountain biker

Personal information
- Nickname: Iron Sally
- Born: 11 April 1978 (age 48) England; Great Britain

Cycling career
- Sport: Cycling
- Current team: Topeak-Ergon Racing Team
- Discipline: MTB marathon
- Role: Rider

Professional teams
- 2009: Topeak-Ergon Racing Team
- 2018: Canyon Topeak Factory Racing

Major wins
- (United Kingdom) GBR DH National Champion (6 Wins) (Europe) EUR DH European Champion (3 Wins); UCI DH World Cup (16 Wins); UCI DH World Cup Overall (3 Wins); UCI DH World Champion (1 Win)
Medal record
Representing Great Britain
Mountain Bike
World Championships
Silver medal – second place	2013 Kirchberg	{{{2}}}
Silver medal – second place	2016 Laissac	{{{2}}}

Sally Bigham ('Iron Sally'; born 11 April 1978) is an English professional marathon mountain biker. During her career she won six national championships and 16 races in the UCI MTB Marathon Series. She has been awarded the silver medal twice (2013, 2016) in the UCI Mountain Bike Marathon World Championships. Prior to becoming a professional mountain bike rider in 2010, she was a medical researcher and university lecturer.

Wikidata Q13590108

== Personal life and education ==
Bigham was born 11 April 1978 in Pool-in-Wharfedale. She was awarded a PhD in psychology from Brunel University.

In January 2018, after the birth of a child she took a break from racing, although continued to cycle for exercise.

== Career ==
Bigham had a career as a university psychology researcher and lecturer until 2010, with posts at Thames Valley University and then Bournemouth University.

She also raced on mountain bikes at the weekend and was successful in being placed within the top ten at the mountain bike marathon world championships. She started mountain biking in 2006 and, specialising in mountain bike marathons, was British champion by 2008 while still working full-time at the university. In 2009 she again won the Trek National Marathon Championship, despite a high-speed crash early in the race. This was held over a 22 km (14 miles) course at Margam, Wales. By 2010 she had decided to take a 'gap year' to cycle full-time and then review her career goals. She won in the British Championships, came eighth at the world championships and was ranked second in the world. Her most significant performance was in the Roc d'Azur race, the last race of the season. After her achievements that year, despite injuries, she decided to be a professional cyclist.

She joined the Topeak-Ergon Racing team in 2009 and won the Trek National Marathon Championship.

In 2013 she came second in the 85 kilometre (53 miles) UCI World Marathon Championship in Kirchberg, Austria. Rain in the previous week made the course slippery and required the competitors to plan their tactics carefully over the 4.5 hour race.

In 2016 she was the European mountain bike marathon champion.

In 2018 her team was renamed the Canyon Topeak Factory Racing team.

She retired from competition to work as a coach.

== Publications ==
Bingham was the author or co-author of at least 10 scientific publications and book reviews. These included:

- Sally Bigham (2910) Comprehension of pretence in children with autism. British Journal of Developmental Psychology 26 265-280
- Jill Boucher, Sally Bigham, Andrew Mayes & Tom Muskett (2008) Recognition and Language in Low Functioning Autism. Journal of Autism and Developmental Disorders 38 Article number: 1259

== Awards ==
European Champion 2016 6× UCI World Marathon Series winner 5× British Marathon Champion 4× Silver European Medals 2× Silver World Championship medal

2013 UCI Mountain Bike World Championships: Silver in Sally Bigham - Elite women's marathon
