= Daniel Geismayr =

Austrian cyclist

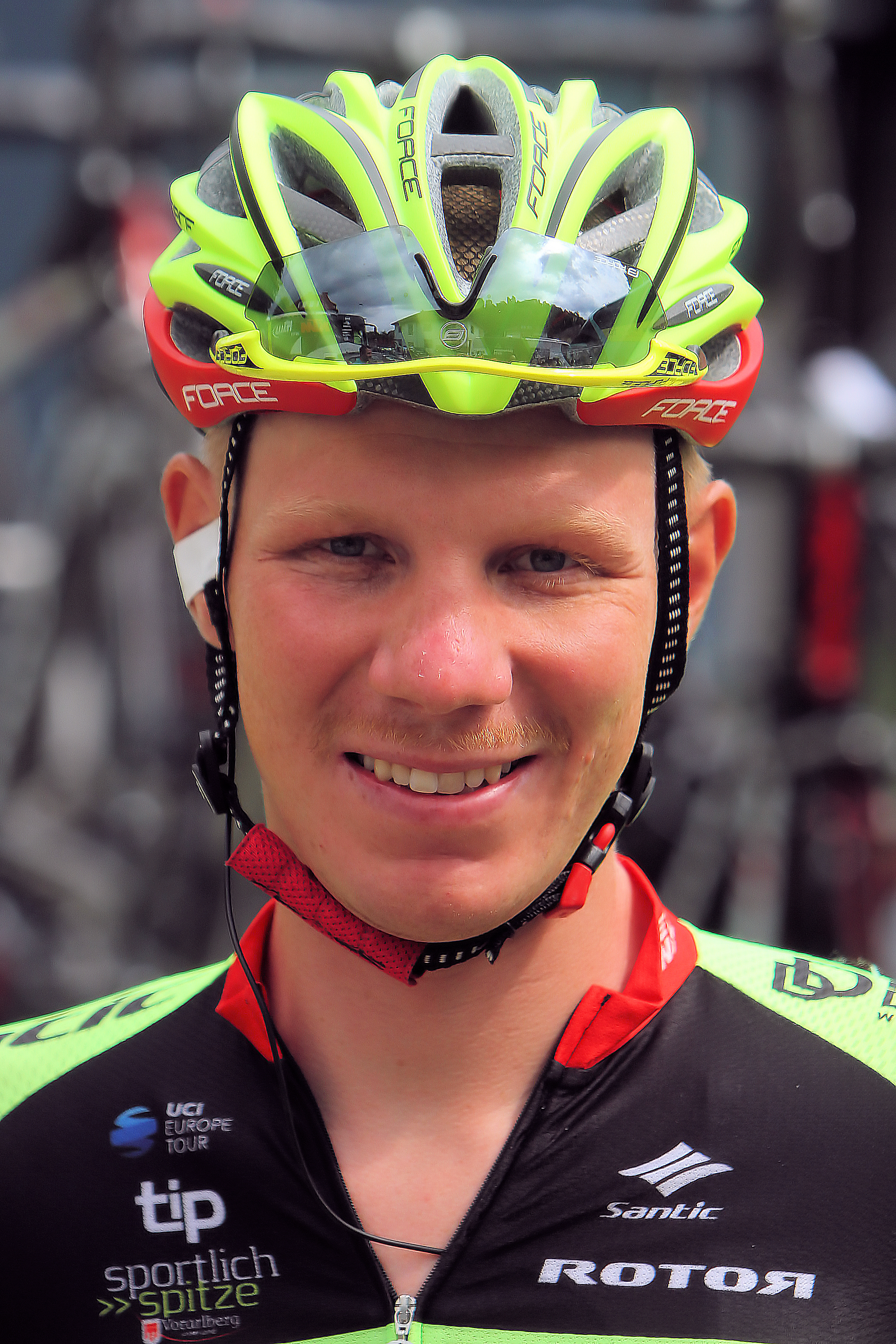
- Geismayr in 2019

Personal information
- Full name: Daniel Geismayr
- Born: 28 August 1989 (age 37)

Cycling career
- Sport: Cycling
- Current team: Trek–Pirelli
- Disciplines: Road; Cyclo-cross; Mountain biking
- Role: Rider

Professional teams
- 2017–2020: Team Vorarlberg
- 2021–: Trek–Pirelli
Medal record
Representing Austria
Men's Mountain bike marathon
World Championships
Silver medal – second place	2018 Auronzo di Cadore	Men's race

Daniel Geismayr (born 28 August 1989) is an Austrian racing cyclist, who currently rides for UCI Mountain Bike Team Trek–Pirelli. He rode for Team Vorarlberg Santic in the men's team time trial event at the 2018 UCI Road World Championships.

== Major results ==
2017
1st Overall Swiss Epic (with Jochen Käss)
7th Overall Tour de Savoie Mont Blanc
2018
7th Overall Oberösterreichrundfahrt
