= Andreas Seewald =

German cyclist(born 1991)

Personal information
- Born: 21 August 1991 (age 35)

Cycling career
- Sport: Cycling
- Current team: Canyon Northwave MTB Team
- Discipline: Cross-country
- Role: Rider
- Rider type: Marathon

Major wins
- Mountain bike World Marathon Championships (2021, 2026)
Medal record
Men's cross-country marathon
Representing Germany
World Championships
Gold medal – first place	2021 Elba	Men's race
Silver medal – second place	2022 Haderslev	Men's race
European Championships
Gold medal – first place	2021 Evolene	Men's race
Gold medal – first place	2025 Casella	Men's race

Andreas Seewald (born 21 August 1991) is a German cross-country mountain biker. He won the 2021 UCI Mountain Bike Marathon World Championships.

== Major results ==
2017
UCI MTB Marathon Series

1st La Forestiere
1st Montafon

2018
UCI MTB Marathon Series

1st La Forestiere
1st Grand Raid BCVS

2021
1st Marathon, UCI World Championships
1st Marathon, UEC European Championships
1st Overall UCI MTB Marathon Series

1st Roc d'Azur
1st Hero Südtirol Dolomites
1st La Forestiere
1st Grand Raid BCVS

2022
1st Marathon, National Championships
2nd Marathon, UCI World Championships
2nd Overall Cape Epic (with Martin Stošek)
UCI MTB Marathon Series

1st Jaén and Córdoba
1st Verbier
1st Jelenia Góra
3rd Roc d'Azur

2023
1st Marathon, National Championships
1st Roc d'Azur
UCI Marathon World Cup

3rd Morzine-Avoriaz
4th Nové Město

2024
1st Marathon, National Championships
UCI Marathon World Cup

2nd Megève

4th Marathon, UCI World Championships
2025
1st Marathon, UEC European Championships
1st Marathon, National Championships
1st Overall UCI Marathon World Cup

1st Sëlva Val Gardena
1st Kirchzarten
2nd Sant Julià de Lòria

2026
1st Marathon, UCI World Championships
