= Héctor Leonardo Páez =

Colombian cyclist (born 1982)

Héctor Páez
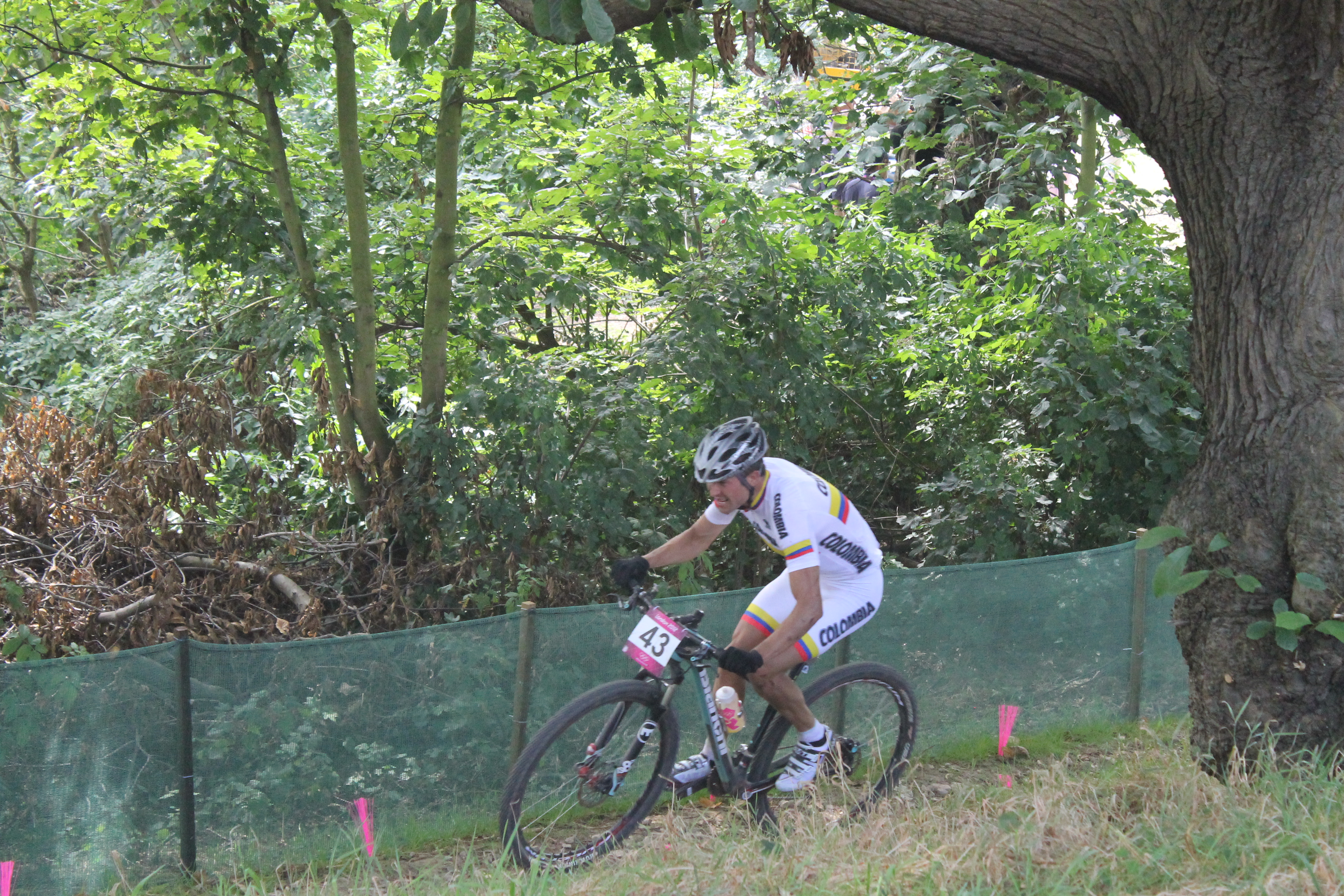
- Páez at the 2012 Summer Olympics

Personal information
- Full name: Héctor Leonardo Páez León
- Born: July 10, 1982 (age 44) Ciénega, Boyacá, Colombia

Cycling career
- Sport: Cycling
- Disciplines: Mountain bike; Road
- Role: Rider
- Rider type: cross-country; marathon

Major wins
- Mountain bike World Marathon Championships (2019, 2020)
Medal record
Representing Colombia
Men's mountain bike marathon
World Championships
Gold medal – first place	2019 Grächen - St. Niklaus	Marathon
Gold medal – first place	2020 Sakarya	Marathon
Silver medal – second place	2006 Oisans	Marathon
Bronze medal – third place	2013 Kirchberg	Marathon
Bronze medal – third place	2015 Selva di Val Gardena	Marathon
Bronze medal – third place	2018 Auronzo di Cadore	Marathon
Bronze medal – third place	2025 Valais	Marathon
Men's mountain bike racing
Pan American Games
Gold medal – first place	2011 Guadalajara	Cross-country
Central American and Caribbean Games
Gold medal – first place	2014 Veracruz	Cross-country
Bolivarian Games
Gold medal – first place	2013 Trujillo	Cross-country

Héctor Leonardo Páez León (born July 10, 1982) is a Colombian cross-country mountain biker. He came 26th at the 2008 Summer Olympics, while at the 2012 Summer Olympics, he competed in the Men's cross-country at Hadleigh Farm, finishing in 28th place.

During 2019 he win for the 5th time the Sella Ronda Hero (Dolomites), and win for the first time the Monterosa Prestige Marathon (Aosta Valley).

He became the UCI Mountain Bike Marathon World Champion in 2019 and 2020.
