= Georg Egger =

German cyclist (born 1995)

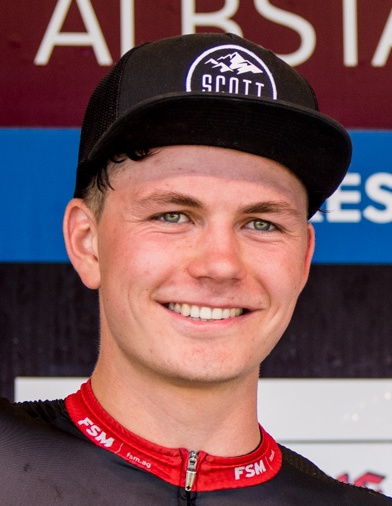
- Egger in 2017

Personal information
- Born: 22 March 1995 (age 31)
- Height: 1.87 m (6 ft 2 in)
- Weight: 80 kg (176 lb)

Cycling career
- Sport: Cycling
- Current team: Orbea Leatt Speed Company; MSC Wiesenbach
- Disciplines: Cross-country; Gravel; Road
- Role: Rider

Amateur team
- 2025–: MSC Wiesenbach

Professional team
- Orbea Leatt Speed Company

Major wins
- Mountain bike Cape Epic (2022)
Medal record
Representing Germany
Men's mountain bike racing
World Championships
| Bronze medal – third place | 2013 Pietermaritzburg | Team relay |
European Championships
| Bronze medal – third place | 2016 Huskvarna | Team relay |

Georg Egger (born 22 March 1995) is a German cross-country mountain biker. In 2022, he won the Cape Epic with Lukas Baum.

== Major results ==
=== Mountain bike ===
2013
3rd Team relay, UCI World Championships
2016
3rd Team relay, UEC European Championships
4th Cross-country, UCI Under-23 World Championships
2017
3rd Cross-country, National Championships
2018
2nd Cross-country, National Championships
2021
3rd Cross-country, National Championships
2022
1st Overall Cape Epic (with Lukas Baum)
2023
2nd Overall Cape Epic (with Lukas Baum)

=== Gravel ===
2025
UCI World Series

3rd Sardegna
