= Diego Arias (cyclist) =

Colombian mountain biker

Personal information
- Born: 9 February 1988 (age 38)

Cycling career
- Sport: Cycling
- Discipline: Mountain bike racing
- Role: cross-country; marathon
Medal record
Men's marathon mountain bike
Representing Colombia
World Championships
| Silver medal – second place | 2021 Elba | Marathon |

Diego Alfonso Arias Cuervo (born 9 February 1988) is a Colombian mountain biker. He competed in the men's cross-country event at the 2024 Summer Olympics.

== Major results ==
=== MTB ===
2013
3rd Cross-country, National Championships
2014
2nd Cross-country, National Championships
2016
2nd Cross-country, National Championships
2023
1st Cross-country, National Championships
