= Tiago Ferreira (cyclist) =

Portuguese cyclist

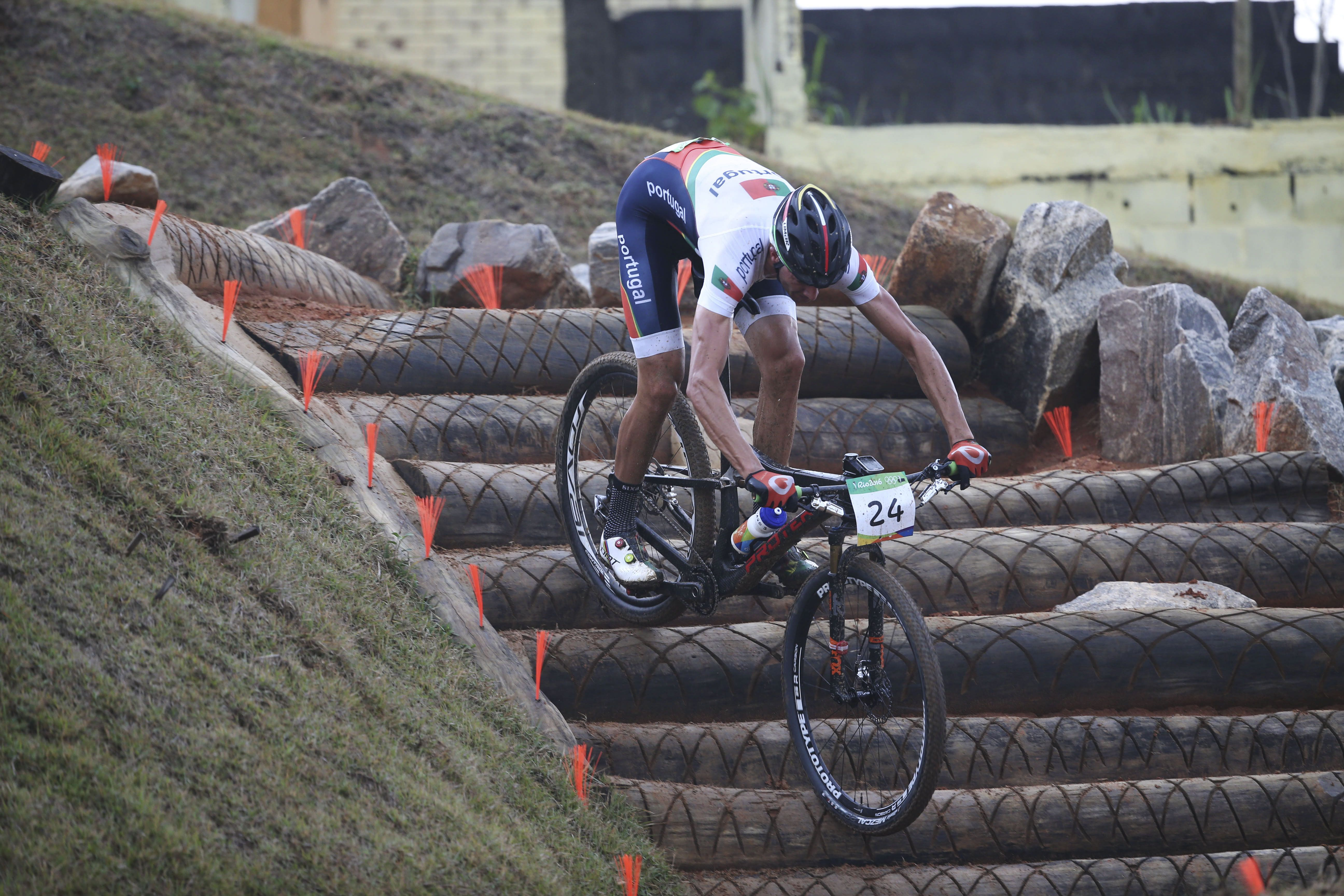
- Ferreira competing in the cross-country race at the 2016 Summer Olympics

Personal information
- Full name: Tiago Jorge de Oliveira Ferreira
- Born: 7 December 1988 (age 37) Viseu, Portugal
- Height: 1.93 m (6 ft 4 in)

Cycling career
- Sport: Cycling
- Current team: Team Protek
- Discipline: Cross-country
- Role: Rider

Major wins
- MTB Marathon World Championships (2016)
Medal record
Men's cross-country marathon
Representing Portugal
World Championships
Gold medal – first place	2016 Laissac	Men's
Silver medal – second place	2020 Sakarya	Men's
Silver medal – second place	2017 Singen	Men's
European Championships
Gold medal – first place	2019 Kvam	Men's
Gold medal – first place	2017 Svit	Men's
Silver medal – second place	2016 Sigulda	Men's

Tiago Jorge de Oliveira Ferreira (born 7 December 1988) is a Portuguese mountain biker from Viseu, who specialises in the cross-country discipline.

In June 2016, he won the cross-country marathon silver medal at the European Championships in Sigulda, Latvia. Three weeks later, he won the gold medal at the 2016 UCI Mountain Bike Marathon World Championships in Laissac, France, becoming the second Portuguese cyclist to win a world championship title, after Rui Costa.
