= Alban Lakata =

Austrian cyclist

Personal information
- Born: 25 June 1979 (age 47) Lienz, Austria

Cycling career
- Sport: Cycling
- Current team: Team Bulls
- Discipline: Mountain biking
- Role: Rider

Professional teams
- 2004: Radteam Tirol
- 2005–2006: Specialized Factory Racing
- 2007: Trek VW
- 2008: Trek–Marco Polo
- 2009–2018: Topeak Ergon Racing Team
- 2019–: Team Bulls
Medal record
Men's cross-country marathon
Representing Austria
World Championships
Gold medal – first place	2017 Singen	Men's
Gold medal – first place	2015 Val Gardena	Men's
Gold medal – first place	2010 Saint-Wendel	Men's
Silver medal – second place	2016 Laissac	Men's
Silver medal – second place	2014 Pietermaritzburg	Men's
Silver medal – second place	2013 Kirchberg in Tirol	Men's
Silver medal – second place	2009 Graz	Men's
European Championships
Gold medal – first place	2013 Singen	Men's
Gold medal – first place	2008 Albstadt	Men's
Silver medal – second place	2017 Svit	Men's
Silver medal – second place	2012 Jablonné v Podještědí	Men's
Silver medal – second place	2004 Wałbrzych	Men's

Alban Lakata (born 25 June 1979 in Lienz) is an Austrian cyclist. Specializing in marathon mountain biking, he won the world championships for the event in 2010, 2015 and 2017. He has also won the Leadville 100 race three times, and set the all-time course record in 2015. He also occasionally competes in road cycling, having entered the national road race championships several times, as well as the Pro Ötztaler 5500 in 2017.

== Major results ==
2004
3rd European XCM Championships
3rd National XCO Championships
2005
3rd National XCO Championships
2007
1st Black Forest Ultra Bike Marathon
2008
1st European XCM Championships
1st National XCM Championships
3rd National XCO Championships
2009
1st National XCM Championships
2nd UCI World XCM Championships
2010
1st UCI World XCM Championships
1st National XCM Championships
1st Roc d'Azur
2nd National XCO Championships
2011
1st National XCM Championships
2nd National XCO Championships
2012
1st Leadville 100
3rd European XCM Championships
2013
1st European XCM Championships
1st Leadville 100
2nd UCI World XCM Championships
2014
2nd UCI World XCM Championships
2015
1st UCI World XCM Championships
1st National XCM Championships
1st Leadville 100
2016
2nd UCI World XCM Championships
2nd National XCM Championships
2017
1st UCI World XCM Championships
2nd European XCM Championships
3rd National XCM Championships
2018
2nd National XCM Championships
2019
2nd National XCM Championships
2020
1st National XCM Championships
2021
1st National XCM Championships
