= Martin Stošek =

Czech mountain bike racer

Personal information
- Born: 4 January 1994 (age 32)
- Height: 1.76 m (5 ft 9 in)
- Weight: 67 kg (148 lb)

Cycling career
- Sport: Cycling
- Current team: Buff Megamo Team
- Disciplines: Mountain bike; Gravel
- Role: Rider
- Rider type: Marathon

Amateur team
- 2011–2013: Ceska Sporitelna Specilalized Junior MTB Team

Professional teams
- 2014–2015: SRAM Mitas Trek
- 2021–2024: Canyon Northwave MTB Team
- 2025–: Buff Megamo Team

Major wins
- Gravel European Championships (2024)
Medal record
Representing Czech Republic
Men's Mountain bike marathon
World Championships
Silver medal – second place	2023 Glasgow	Men's race
Bronze medal – third place	2020 Sakarya	Men's race
European Championships
Bronze medal – third place	2021 Evolène	Men's race
Men's gravel bicycle racing
Representing Belgium
European Championships
Gold medal – first place	2024 Asiago	Elite

Martin Stošek (born 4 January 1994) is a Czech professional gravel and mountain bike racer.

A specialist in marathon races, he has won several medals at the European and World Championships. He also races gravel, having won the 2024 European Gravel Championships.

== Major results ==
=== Mountain bike ===
2012
3rd Cross-country, National Junior Championships
2013
3rd Cross-country, National Under-23 Championships
2019
National Championships

1st Marathon
2nd Cross-country

1st Malevil Cup
1st Südtirol Dolomiti Superbike
1st Capoliveri Legend Cup
2020
1st Capoliveri Legend Cup
National Championships

2nd Marathon
3rd Cross-country

3rd Marathon, UCI World Championships
3rd Overall Swiss Epic (with Kristián Hynek)
2021
1st Sakarya Cup
1st Bike Marathon Jelenia Góra
1st Hero Dubai
2nd Grand Raid BCVS
2nd La Forestière
2022
1st Overall Andalucía Bike Race (with Andreas Seewald)
2nd Overall Cape Epic (with Andreas Seewald)
2nd Extreme Sur Loue
2023
1st Overall Swiss Epic (with Marc Stutzmann)
1st Capoliveri Legend Cup
2nd Marathon, UCI World Championships
UCI Marathon World Cup

2nd Finale Ligure

3rd Mediterranean Epic
2024
1st Marathon, National Championships
1st Bike Transalp
1st Malevil Cup
UCI Marathon World Cup

2nd Lake Placid

2nd Hero Südtirol Dolomites
2025
1st Marathon, National Championships

=== Gravel ===
2024
1st UEC European Championships
1st National Championships
1st MČR Gravel
UCI World Series

3rd Gravel Suisse
