= United States National Mountain Bike Championships =

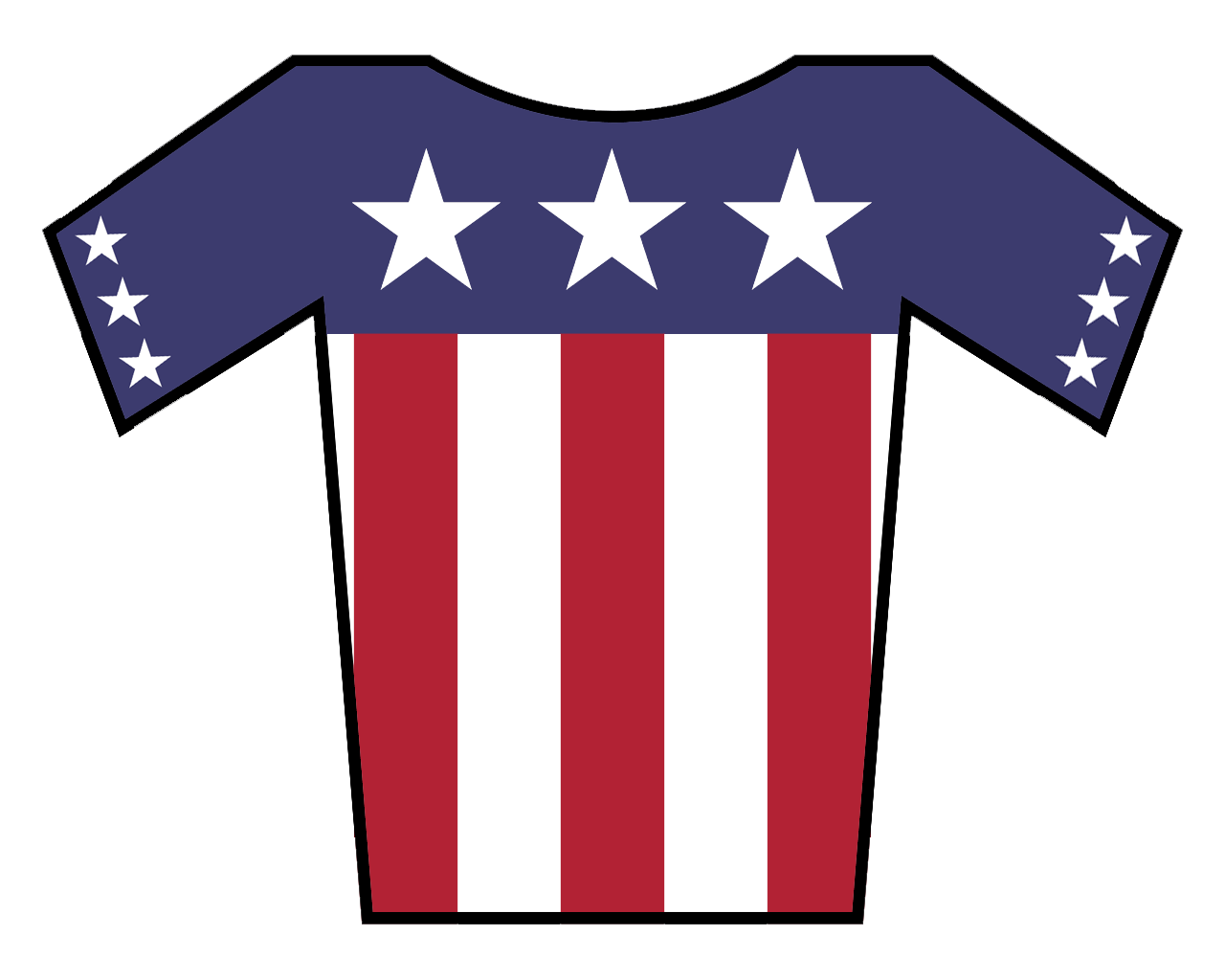
- The champion's jersey

Race details
- Region: United States
- Discipline: Mountain biking
- Type: National championship
- Organiser: USA Cycling

History
- First edition: 1984

The United States National Mountain Bike Championships are held annually to decide the cycling champions in the mountain biking discipline, across various categories.

== Men ==
=== Cross-country ===
Year	Winner	Second	Third
1984	Joe Murray		
1985	Joe Murray		
1986	Ned Overend		
1987	Ned Overend	John Tomac	Mike Kloser
1989	Ned Overend	Donald Myrah	Rishi Grewal
1990	Ned Overend		
1991	Ned Overend		
1992	Ned Overend		
2002	Jeremy Horgan-Kobelski		
2003	Jeremy Horgan-Kobelski		
2004	Jeremy Horgan-Kobelski	Adam Craig	Carl Decker
2005	Jeremy Horgan-Kobelski	Todd Wells	Adam Craig
2006	Ryan Trebon	Barry Wicks	Jeremiah Bishop
2007	Adam Craig	Jeremiah Bishop	Michael Broderick
2008	Adam Craig	Ryan Trebon	Jeremy Horgan-Kobelski
2009	Jeremy Horgan-Kobelski	Adam Craig	Samuel Schultz
2010	Todd Wells	Jeremy Horgan-Kobelski	Ryan Trebon
2011	Todd Wells	Samuel Schultz	Adam Craig
2012	Samuel Schultz	Todd Wells	Jeremy Horgan-Kobelski
2013	Stephen Ettinger	Todd Wells	Jeremiah Bishop
2014	Todd Wells	Kerry Werner	Jeremiah Bishop
2015	Howard Grotts	Keegan Swenson	Alexander Grant
2016	Howard Grotts	Keegan Swenson	Russell Finsterwald
2017	Howard Grotts	Stephen Ettinger	Payson McElveen
2018	Howard Grotts	Luke Vrouwenvelder	Christopher Blevins
2019	Keegan Swenson	Howard Grotts	Russell Finsterwald
2020	not contested		
2021	Keegan Swenson	Stephan Davoust	Luke Vrouwenvelder
2022	Keegan Swenson	Christopher Blevins	Eric Brunner
2023	Christopher Blevins	Riley Amos	Lukas Vrouwenvelder

=== Downhill ===
Year	Winner	Second	Third
2003	Eric Carter		
2004	Chris Del Bosco	Duncan Riffle	Henry O'Donnell
2007	Cole Bangert	Luke Strobel	Christopher Herndon
2008	Geritt Beytagh	Cody Warren	Duncan Riffle
2009	Aaron Gwin	Duncan Riffle	Cody Warren
2010	Aaron Gwin	Logan Binggeli	Tyler Immer
2011	Neko Mulally	Logan Binggeli	Aaron Gwin
2012	Aaron Gwin	Neko Mulally	Eliot Jackson
2013	Aaron Gwin	Logan Binggeli	Mitch Ropelato
2014	Aaron Gwin	Neko Mulally	Mitch Ropelato
2015	Aaron Gwin	Michael Sylvestri	Luca Shaw
2016	Aaron Gwin	Mitch Ropelato	Shane Leslie
2017	Aaron Gwin	Luca Shaw	Charlie Harrison
2018	Neko Mulally	Charlie Harrison	Luca Shaw
2019	Neko Mulally	Charlie Harrison	Dakotah Norton
2020	not contested		
2021	Dakotah Norton	Luca Shaw	Austin Dooley
2022	Dakotah Norton	Aaron Gwin	Austin Dooley
2023	Luca Shaw	Austin Dooley	Dante Silva

=== Marathon ===
Year	Winner	Second	Third
2009	Jeremy Horgan-Kobelski	Jeremiah Bishop	Jay Henry
2010	Jeremy Horgan-Kobelski	Samuel Schultz	David Wiens
2011	Adam Craig	Carl Decker	Samuel Schultz
2012	Todd Wells	Carl Decker	Adam Craig
2013	Todd Wells	Stephen Ettinger	Alexander Grant
2014	Todd Wells	Stephen Ettinger	Howard Grotts
2015	Todd Wells	Jeremiah Bishop	Keck Baker
2016	Todd Wells	Jeremiah Bishop	Ryan Woodall
2017	Payson McElveen	Howard Grotts	Jeremiah Bishop
2018	Payson McElveen	Howard Grotts	Nicholas Beechan
2019	Russell Finsterwald	Stephan Davoust	Payson McElveen
2020	not contested		
2021	Stephan Davoust	Lukas Vrouwenvelder	Payson McElveen
2022	Lukas Vrouwenvelder	Stephan Davoust	Carson Beckett
2023	Cole Paton	Cayden Parker	Carson Beckett

== Women ==
=== Cross-country ===
Year	Winner	Second	Third
1985	Jacquie Phelan	Mary Lee Atkins	Cindy Whitehead
1986	Cindy Whitehead		
1987	Lisa Muhich	Sara Ballantyne	Cindy Whitehead
1989	Sara Ballantyne	Lisa Muhich	Susan De Mattei
1999	Alison Dunlap		
2002	Alison Dunlap		
2003	Mary McConneloug		
2004	Alison Dunlap	Dara Marks-Marino	Susan Haywood
2005	Mary McConneloug	Alison Dunlap	Willow Koerber
2006	Georgia Gould	Heather Irmiger	Mary McConneloug
2007	Mary McConneloug	Georgia Gould	Willow Koerber
2008	Mary McConneloug	Georgia Gould	Heather Irmiger
2009	Heather Irmiger	Willow Koerber	Katherine Compton
2010	Georgia Gould	Heather Irmiger	Willow Koerber
2011	Georgia Gould	Lea Davison	Katherine Compton
2012	Georgia Gould	Lea Davison	Heather Irmiger
2013	Lea Davison	Monique Pua Mata	Mary McConneloug
2014	Lea Davison	Georgia Gould	Evelyn Dong
2015	Chloe Woodruff	Erin Huck	Rose Grant
2016	Erin Huck	Georgia Gould	Chloe Woodruff
2017	Kate Courtney	Lea Davison	Erin Huck
2018	Kate Courtney	Erin Huck	Ellen Noble
2019	Chloe Woodruff	Evelyn Dong	Lea Davison
2020	not contested		
2021	Erin Huck	Alexis Skarda	Rose Grant
2022	Savilia Blunk	Kate Courtney	Gwendalyn Gibson
2023	Savilia Blunk	Kate Courtney	Gwendalyn Gibson

=== Downhill ===
Year	Winner	Second	Third
2002	Lisa Sher		
2003	Marla Streb		
2004	Marla Streb	Lisa Sher	Melissa Buhl
2007	Kathleen Pruitt	Melissa Buhl	Marla Streb
2008	Melissa Buhl	Marla Streb	Dawn Bourque
2009	Melissa Buhl	Kathleen Pruitt	Lisa Myklak
2010	Jill Kintner	Jacqueline Harmony	Melissa Buhl
2011	Jill Kintner	Jacqueline Harmony	Jaime Rees
2012	Jacqueline Harmony	Melissa Buhl	Jaime Rees
2013	Jill Kintner	Jacqueline Harmony	Anne Galyean
2014	Jill Kintner	Abigail Hippely	Amanda Batty
2015	Jill Kintner	Jacqueline Thomas	Rebecca Gardner
2016	Jill Kintner	Samantha Kingshill	Jacqueline Thomas
2017	Jill Kintner	Amanda Batty	Jacqueline Thomas
2018	Samantha Soriano	Caroline Washam	Jill Kintner
2019	Jill Kintner	Clare Hamilton	Kialani Hines
2021	Kailey Skelton	Caroline Washam	Ella Erickson
2022	Kailey Skelton	Amy Morrison	Mazie Hayden
2023	Anna Newkirk	Kailey Skelton	Kale Cushman

=== Marathon ===
Year	Winner	Second	Third
2004	Gretchen Reeves	Melissa Thomas	Monique Pua Mata
2005	Gretchen Reeves	Monique Pua Mata	Mandy Eakins
2006	Melissa Thomas	Louise Kobin	Monique Pua Mata
2007	Shonny Vanlandingham	Monique Pua Mata	Kelley Mattingly
2008	Sari Anderson	Gretchen Reeves	Jennifer Gersbach
2009	Heather Irmiger	Monique Pua Mata	Gretchen Reeves
2010	Heather Irmiger	Amy Dombroski	Krista Park
2011	Monique Pua Mata	Kelli Emmett	Heather Irmiger
2012	Monique Pua Mata	Kelli Emmett	Sari Anderson
2013	Monique Pua Mata	Serena Gordon	Rose Grant
2014	Rose Grant	Joey Lythgoe	Nina Baum
2015	Rose Grant	Cheryl Sornson	Ally Stacher
2016	Rose Grant	Kaitlyn Patterson	Lisa Randall
2017	Rose Grant	Crystal Anthony	Amy Beisel
2018	Amy Beisel	Kaysee Armstrong	Larissa Connors
2019	Rose Grant	Kaysee Armstrong	Crystal Anthony
2020	not contested		
2021	Alexis Skarda	Rose Grant	Lea Davison
2022	Erin Huck	Deanna Mayles	Lea Davison
2023	Alexis Skarda	Deanna Mayles	Hannah Otto
