= Leadville Trail 100 MTB =

USA long-distance mountain bike race

Race details
- Date: Second Saturday in August
- Region: Leadville, Colorado
- Nickname: LT100
- Discipline: Mountain Bike
- Type: 100 Mile Ultra Endurance

History
- First edition: 1994
- Editions: 27

The Leadville Trail 100 MTB is the second oldest of the well-known 100-mile (160 km) marathon mountain bike races held in the United States, the oldest being the Wilderness 101 in central Pennsylvania. The Leadville Trail 100 MTB was first run in 1994 and has become one of the best marketed, attended and known marathon events in mountain bike racing.

Entry to the event is controlled and restricted. Some entries are awarded by a random lottery, while other entries are awarded by finishing well in a series of qualifying events. Lottery entries are due by the end of December for the race that is run the second Saturday in August. Qualifying events are similar to the Leadville 100 race but shorter, typically around 100 km in length. Courses for qualifying events typically cover similar terrain (roads, dirt roads, gravel roads and mild trails) with similar vertical elevation gains (~100 feet per 1 mile).

== History ==
The Leadville Trail 100 MTB race is an outgrowth of the Leadville Trail 100 footrace. Both races were begun by Ken Chlouber as part of an effort to spur the economy of the town of Leadville after the Climax Mine, which employed many residents, closed. The mountain bike race was the idea of Tony Post, then a marketing vice president at the Rockport Company, sponsor of the event who arranged for television coverage for both races. The first mountain bike race drew just 150 entrants, while the 2009 edition allowed 1400 entrants. The race has continued to grow and to allow more entrants. In 2010, the event was purchased by Life Time Fitness. In 2019, there were 1,644 racers. In 2022 it was added to the Life Time Grand Prix.

== Course ==
The race is run on an out and back course of about 50 miles (80 km), starting and finishing in downtown Leadville, Colorado, United States, at 10,200 ft (3,100 m) elevation. The course includes five major climbs: St Kevins, Sugarloaf, Columbine, Powerline, and Turquoise Lake Road. The largest of these is the climb to Columbine Mine, which gains over 3,000 feet (910 m) of elevation. Total elevation gain is approximately 11,000 feet (3,400 m) when verified by GPS tracks of past competitors. The actual length of the course is approximately 104 miles (167 km), and the greatest elevation is over 12,500 feet (3,800 m) at the half-way point at the Columbine mine. There are six aid stations on the course, at Pipeline, Twin Lakes Dam, Columbine Mine, Twin Lakes Dam, Pipeline, and Carter Summit.

In 2026 the course was modified for wildfires, reducing the climbing by over 3000 feet.

== Cutoff Times ==
Racers must checkout of aid stations prior to cutoff times. These times place limits on the amount of time racers have to finish a course leg. They are found in the Leadville Trail 100 MTB Athlete Guide and also in the event schedule on the website.

Riders must check out of each aid station prior to the cut-off times. Failure to do so will end the racer's competitive time and result in a did not finish (DNF) race result status. In the final leg toward the race finish, racers must finish prior to a 9-hour cutoff time to qualify for the "big buckle" and a 12-hour cutoff time for completion and to qualify for the "small buckle". Belt buckle times were reduced by 45 minuets in 2026 to adjust for the course changes.

=== Cutoff Times ===
Course Leg	Elapsed Race Time	Actual Cutoff Time
Twin Lakes Outbound (40.8 miles)	Elapsed (gun) time, 4 hours, 20 minutes	Actual Time 10:50am MST
Twin Lakes Return (60 miles)	Elapsed (gun) time, 8 hours, 5 minutes	Actual Time 2:35pm MST
Pipeline Return (74.7 miles)	Elapsed (gun) time, 9 hours, 5 minutes	Actual Time 3:35pm MST
Carter Summit (92.5 miles)	Elapsed (gun) time, 9 hours, 50 minutes	Actual Time 4:20pm MST
Race Finish (104 miles)	Elapsed (chip) time, 12 hours, 00 minutes	Actual Time 6:30pm - 6:50pm MST

== Notable Racers ==
Between 2003 and 2008, David Wiens, a 2000 inductee to the Mountain Bike Hall of Fame, won the race each year. In 2007, Wiens broke the 7 hour mark for the first time at 6:58:46 while holding off Floyd Landis by just under 2 minutes. In 2008, Wiens won again beating Lance Armstrong by just under 2 minutes and setting a new course record of 6:45:45 . In 2009, Armstrong returned winning and establishing a new course record of 6:28:50.9. Armstrong's involvement with the race brought increased attention to the Leadville Trail 100 MTB, evidenced by the fact that race organizers offered a live webcast for purchase beginning in 2009. In 2010, Armstrong was unable to return due to injury, but his Team RadioShack teammate Levi Leipheimer, riding in his first mountain bike race, won and set a new course record of 6:16:37. In the 2010 women's race, two-time winner Rebecca Rusch also broke the course record, which had stood since 1997. In 2011, a conflict with the Tour of Utah kept Leipheimer away, but U.S. national cross-country bike champion Todd Wells turned in the second-fastest time ever to win, 6:23:38, while Rusch won the women's race again and shaved over 15 minutes off her previous record, with 7:31:46.

== Winners ==
=== Men's winner ===
Year	Name, State or Country	Time
1994	John Stamstad,, Ohio	7:52:53
1995	Russell Worley,, California	7:27:55
1996	Mike Volk,, Colorado	7:22:02
1997	Mike Volk (2),, Colorado	7:05:45
1998	Richard Feldman,, Idaho	7:40:02
1999	Richard Feldman (2),, Idaho	7:10:33
2000	Kevin Willson,, Colorado	7:31:09
2001	Bryson Perry,, Utah	7:30:01
2002	Bryson Perry (2),, Utah	7:32:27
2003	David Wiens,, Colorado	7:07:44
2004	David Wiens (2),, Colorado	7:05:51
2005	David Wiens (3),, Colorado	7:17:47
2006	David Wiens (4),, Colorado	7:13:14
2007	David Wiens (5),, Colorado	6:58:46
2008	David Wiens (6),, Colorado	6:45:45
2009	Lance Armstrong,, Texas	6:28:51
2010	Levi Leipheimer,, California	6:16:37
2011	Todd Wells,, Colorado	6:23:38
2012	Alban Lakata,, Austria	6:32:23
2013	Alban Lakata (2),, Austria	6:04:01
2014	Todd Wells (2),, Colorado	6:16:27
2015	Alban Lakata (3),, Austria	5:58:35
2016	Todd Wells (3),, Colorado	6:19:43
2017	Howard Grotts,, Colorado	6:15:00
2018	Howard Grotts (2),, Colorado	6:18:08
2019	Howard Grotts (3),, Colorado	6:19:18
2020	Not held	
2021	Keegan Swenson,, Utah	6:11:26
2022	Keegan Swenson (2),, Utah	6:00:01
2023	Keegan Swenson (3),, Utah	5:43:31*
2024	Keegan Swenson (4),, Utah	5:49:08
2025	Keegan Swenson (5),, Utah	5:45:33
2026	Keegan Swenson (6),, Utah	5:20:26**

=== Women's winner ===
Year	Name, State	Time
1994	Laurie Brandt,, Colorado	9:03:50
1995	Laurie Brandt (2),, Colorado	8:52:58
1996	Tonia Ralston,, Wyoming	9:56:15
1997	Laurie Brandt (3),, Colorado	7:58:52
1998	Laurie Brandt (4),, Colorado	8:31:24
1999	Cristina Begy,, Colorado	8:55:12
2000	Cristina Begy (2),, Colorado	9:13:51
2001	Joan Miller,, Colorado	9:11:30
2002	Kim Raymond,, Colorado	9:00:57
2003	Carol Quinn,, Colorado	9:19:49
2004	Jilene Mecham,, Utah	9:37:18
2005	Joan Miller (2),, Colorado	8:51:26
2006	Lisel Robert,, Utah	8:47:39
2007	Gretchen Reeves,, Colorado	8:05:29
2008	Susan Williams,, Colorado	8:40:55
2009	Rebecca Rusch,, Idaho	8:14:53
2010	Rebecca Rusch (2),, Idaho	7:47:35
2011	Rebecca Rusch (3),, Idaho	7:31:46
2012	Rebecca Rusch (4),, Idaho	7:28:06
2013	Sally Bigham,, Great Britain	7:17:01
2014	Sally Bigham (2),, Great Britain	7:23:58
2015	Annika Langvad,, Denmark	6:59:24
2016	Sally Bigham (3),, Great Britain	7:05:47
2017	Larissa Connors,, California	7:31:53
2018	Larissa Connors (2),, California	7:40:13
2019	Rose Grant,, Montana	7:36:06
2020	Not held	
2021	Rose Grant,, Montana	7:23:57
2022	Hannah Otto,, Utah	7:24:12
2023	Sofía Gómez Villafañe,, Argentina	7:09:48
2024	Melisa Rollins,, Utah	7:10:10
2025	Kate Courtney,, California	6:48:54*
2026	Melisa Rollins,, Utah	5:58:43**

*Course Record

**Modified Course

== See also ==
- Leadville Trail 100 is an ultramarathon running race.
