= Keegan Swenson =

American cyclist (born 1994)

Personal information
- Born: February 16, 1994 (age 32) Park City, Utah
- Height: 1.78 m (5 ft 10 in)
- Weight: 66 kg (146 lb)

Cycling career
- Sport: Cycling
- Current team: Specialized Off-Road
- Disciplines: Mountain bike; Gravel
- Role: Rider

Professional teams
- 2013–2014: Cannondale Factory Racing
- 2017: Cannondale 3rox
- 2018–2020: Stans-Pivot Pro Team
- 2021–2025: Santa Cruz SRAM HTSQD
- 2026–2028: Specialized Off-Road

Major wins
- Mountain bike World Marathon Championships (2025)
Medal record
Men's mountain bike racing
Representing United States
World Championships
Gold medal – first place	2025 Valais	Marathon
Silver medal – second place	2019 Mont Saint-Anne	Mixed relay

Keegan Swenson (born February 16, 1994) is an American mountain bike and gravel racing cyclist, riding for the Specialized Off-Road Team, and is the current Marathon Mountain Biking World Champion. He has won the Leadville Trail 100 MTB for 6 consecutive years (2021-2026), and holds the course record of 5:43:31, which he set in 2023. He also won the first three editions of the Life Time Grand Prix overall race series.

== Road cycling ==
In September 2022 he received a late call-up to represent USA Cycling in 2022 UCI Road World Championships. He finished the road race in 73rd place.

== Major results ==
=== Mountain bike ===
2012
1st Cross-country, National Junior Championships
2nd Cross-country, Pan American Junior Championships
UCI Junior World Cup

2nd Windham
3rd Houffalize
3rd Mont Sainte Anne

2014
1st Cross-country, National Under-23 Championships
2015
2nd Cross-country, National Championships
2016
2nd Cross-country, National Championships
2nd Missoula Challenge
2017
1st Chile Challenge
1st Missoula XC
2018
2nd SOHO Bike Fest PRO XCT
3rd Overall Swiss Epic
2019
1st Cross-country, National Championships
1st SOHO Bike Fest - Elite XCO
1st Missoula XC
2nd Team relay, UCI World Championships
2021
National Championships

1st Cross-country
1st Short track

1st Leadville Trail 100 MTB
1st Telluride 100
1st OZ Trails U.S Pro Cup XCC
1st OZ Trails U.S Pro Cup XCO
2022
1st Cross-country, National Championships
1st Sea Otter Fuego 80k
1st Leadville Trail 100 MTB
2023
1st Sea Otter Fuego XL
1st SOHO Bike Fest - Elite XCO
1st Leadville Trail 100 MTB
2nd Life Time Chequamegon MTB Festival
2024
1st Sea Otter Fuego XL
1st Leadville Trail 100 MTB
1st Life Time Chequamegon MTB Festival
3rd Little Sugar MTB 100k
2025
1st Marathon, UCI World Championships
1st Leadville Trail 100 MTB
2026
1st Leadville Trail 100 MTB

=== Gravel ===
2020
1st Belgian Waffle Ride
2022
1st Crusher in the Tushar
1st SBT GRVL
2nd Big Sugar
2nd Unbound Gravel 200
Men's Life Time Grand Prix Overall Winner
2023
1st Unbound Gravel 200
1st Crusher in the Tushar
1st Belgian Waffle Ride Arizona
1st SBT GRVL
1st US Men's Gravel National Championship
Men's Life Time Grand Prix Overall Winner
5th UCI World Championships
2024
1st Belgian Waffle Ride Arizona
1st SBT GRVL
1st The RAD Dirt Fest
4th Big Sugar
6th US Men's Gravel National Championship
Men's Life Time Grand Prix Overall Winner
2025
1st Life Time Sea Otter Classic Gravel
1st Belgian Waffle Ride Arizona
2nd SBT GRVL
2nd Lauf Gravel Worlds
4th Men's Life Time Grand Prix
2026
5th Unbound Gravel 200
2nd Life Time Sea Otter Classic Gravel
2nd Lauf Gravel Worlds
1st SBT GRVL

=== Road ===
2024
1st Levi's GranFondo Growler - Pro Men
2025
1st Levi's GranFondo Growler - Pro Men

== Personal life ==
Keegan is married to fellow racing cyclist Sofía Gómez Villafañe.
