= Life Time Grand Prix =

American series of off road bicycle races

The Life Time Grand Prix is off-road bicycle racing series in the United States. The first season was in 2022. All races and the series are owned and operated by the title sponsor of the series Life Time Fitness. It is often considered to be the premier gravel racing series in the US. In 2022 the men and women's field both had 30 riders in their respective fields premiering with $250,000 in prize money for the overall standings. In 2025 wild card based on early race results were introduced as well as a U23 field. The racers in the Life Time Grand Prix race against in a pro field for all races not just against other Life Time Grand Prix riders.

== Winners ==
Year	Male	Female
2022	Keegan Swenson	Haley Smith
2023	Keegan Swenson	Sofía Gómez Villafañe
2024	Keegan Swenson	Sofía Gómez Villafañe
2025	Cameron Jones	Sofía Gómez Villafañe
2026	Keegan Swenson	Sofía Gómez Villafañe

== Races ==
Year	Sea Otter	Unbound Gravel	Crusher in the Tushar	Leadville Trail 100 MTB	Chequamegon	Big Sugar	The Rad	Little Sugar
2022	✓	✓	✓	✓	✓	✓		
2023	✓	✓	✓	✓	✓	✓	✓	
2024	✓	✓		✓	✓	✓	✓	
2025	✓	✓		✓	✓	✓		✓
2026	✓	✓		✓	✓	✓		✓
2027	✓	✓		✓	✓	✓	✓	✓
