= Unbound Gravel =

Gravel bicycle races held annually in Emporia, Kansas

Race details
- Date: First weekend after Memorial Day
- Region: Flint Hills around Emporia, Kansas, United States
- Discipline: Gravel cycling
- Competition: Professional and amateur
- Race director: Sean Thurman
- Web site: unboundgravel.com

History
- First edition: 2006
- Editions: 19 (as of 2024)
- First winner: (United States) Dan Hughes (2006) (United States) Leslie Hiemenz (2007)
- Most wins: (United States) Dan Hughes (4 wins) (United States) Rebecca Rusch (3 wins)
- Most recent: (Denmark) Mads Würtz Schmidt (2026) (Argentina) Sofia Gomez Villafane (2026)

Unbound Gravel, formerly known as the Dirty Kanza, is a gravel racing event held annually on rural roads in the Flint Hills region of the Great Plains around Emporia, Kansas, United States. The event is typically held in the late spring and consists of multiple races with lengths varying from 25 miles (40 km) up to 350 miles (560 km). The event's organizers refer to the 200 miles (320 km) race as the "World's Premiere Gravel Grinder", and it is ranked as one of the top gravel bike races in the world. In 2024, there were approximately 5,000 registered riders across all races. In 2026, the event was held May 28 to 31.

== Course ==
Starting and ending in Emporia, the routes runs along rural roads in the Flint Hills of east-central Kansas. The course route varies each year, and can change directions from year to year (north or south route) from Emporia. In some years the temperature on the route has exceeded 100 °F (38 °C) in the afternoon, while other years have seen severe weather including rain and hail. It is not uncommon for rain to occur before or during the race causing some dirt roads to turn into "mud roads".

There are support checkpoints spaced about 50 miles apart for longer races. Riders must carry their own food and water, as well as fix their own tires and bikes. If riders receive outside support at any location other than official checkpoints, it will result in immediate disqualification. Riders may assist other riders by any means and at any time.

== Events ==
The event started as a single 200-mile (320 km) race, but has expanded to include multiple races of various distances to encourage more riders to participate. Though the names of the race distances are rounded off to numerical values, the actual distance varies slightly based on the specific course chosen for the year.

The event consists of the following races:

Race	Distance	Introduced
Unbound Gravel XL	350-mile (560 km)	2018
Unbound Gravel 200	200-mile (320 km)	2006
Unbound Gravel 100	100-mile (160 km)	2013
Unbound Gravel 50	50-mile (80 km)	2013
Unbound Gravel 25	25-mile (40 km)	2013
Unbound Gravel Junior 100	100-mile (160 km)	2013
Unbound Gravel Junior 50	50-mile (80 km)	2013

The Unbound Gravel 200 remains the marquee race of the event with prize money for the Elite rider category. The Unbound Gravel Junior races are for children and young adults aged 12-18 and are part of the USA Cycling Junior Gravel National Series.

== History ==
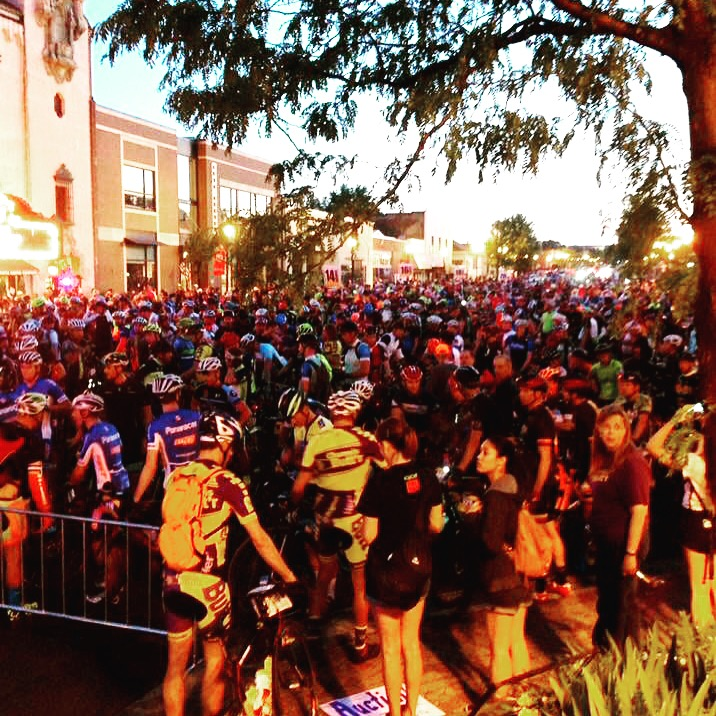
Waiting for Dirty Kanza bike race to start at sunrise in Emporia (2017)

In 2006, the first year of Dirty Kanza had 34 riders participate. It was organized by Joel Dyke and Jim Cummins, and modeled off the similar Trans-Iowa and the Flint Hills Death Ride. The race began with 34 rides and concluded with 15 finishers. Dan Hughes won the race in 12:58 hours.

In 2018, Life Time Fitness purchased Dirty Kanza Productions. That year the race had 2,500 registered riders.

In 2019, the race had 2,750 registered riders.

Several changes occurred in 2020. First the races were postponed from May 29–31 to September 10–13 because of the ongoing worldwide COVID-19 pandemic issues, then later were cancelled.

Organizers considered a name change for the event to remove reference to Kaw nation (also known as Kanza) based on an online petition despite representatives of the Kaw Nation responding to the allegations, saying "Life Time and the Kaw Nation are proud of our relationship, which is built upon mutual respect, dignity, and integrity" and "It was felt that 'Kanza' paid homage to the region (the Kanza Prairie), to its rich history, and to all things associated with the region, including the Kaw Nation". The same year, the event's surviving founder made a statement that the police shooting of an intoxicated black man in Atlanta who grabbed an officer's taser and fired it at the officer was "justified". The ensuing controversy resulted in his eventual firing by the event's parent company, Life Time Fitness. On October 29, 2020, it was announced that the name of the race would be changed to Unbound Gravel.

In 2021, the race had 2,626 registered riders.

In 2022, the 200 pro race became part of the Life Time Grand Prix.

In 2023, there was a total of over 4,000 registered riders for all races.

In 2024, there was a total of around 5,000 registered riders for all races, with 1,480 in the Unbound Gravel 200, and 1,829 in the Unbound Gravel 100. Riders came from all 50 U.S. States and 38 Countries.

The 2025 200-mile editions were won by Cameron Jones and Karolina Migoń. Simon Pellaud of Switzerland was second, after riding in a breakaway with Jones for much of the day. And with Norwegian Torbjørn Andre Røed third, it was the first time Unbound Gravel did not have an American rider on the elite men's 200-mile podium. Jones' finishing time of 8:37 is fastest ever 200-mile Unbound Gravel time, shattering Morton's 2024 record time of 9:11. In the XL race, winners Britton (at 17:49) and Jackson (at 20:57) both shattered course records.

== Winners ==
=== Unbound Gravel 200 ===
Before 2020, the race was known as the Dirty Kanza 200 (or DK 200). This 200 mile race was first held in 2006. Results verified at Athlinks.

Year	Male	Female
2026	(Denmark) Mads Würtz Schmidt	(Argentina) (United States) Sofía Gómez Villafañe
2025	(New Zealand) Cameron Jones	(Poland) Karolina Migoń
2024	(Australia) Lachlan Morton	(Germany) Rosa Klöser
2023	(United States) Keegan Swenson	(Germany) Carolin Schiff
2022	(Netherlands) Ivar Slik	(Argentina) (United States) Sofía Gómez Villafañe
2021	(United States) Ian Boswell	(United States) Lauren De Crescenzo
2020	N/A (race cancelled)	N/A (race cancelled)
2019	(United States) Colin Strickland	(United States) Amity Rockwell
2018	(United States) Ted King	(United States) Kaitlin Keough
2017	(United States) Mat Stephens	(United States) Alison Tetrick
2016	(United States) Ted King	(United States) Amanda Nauman
2015	(United States) Yuri Hauswald	(United States) Amanda Nauman
2014	(United States) Brian Jensen	(United States) Rebecca Rusch
2013	(United States) Dan Hughes	(United States) Rebecca Rusch
2012	(United States) Dan Hughes	(United States) Rebecca Rusch
2011	(United States) Dan Hughes	(United States) Betsy Shogren
2010	(United States) Corey Godfrey	(United States) Emily Brock
2009	(United States) Michael Marchand	N/A
2008	(United States) Cameron Chambers	(United States) Kristen High
2007	(United States) Steve Goetzelman	(United States) Leslie Hiemenz
2006	(United States) Dan Hughes	N/A

=== Unbound Gravel 100 ===
Before 2020, the race was known as the DK 100. This 100 mile race was first held in 2013 as the DK Half Pint. It became an official race distance in 2019. Results verified at Athlinks.

Year	Male	Female
2026	(United States) Robert Oehler	(United States) Kylee Hanel
2025	(United States) Hayden Christian	(Australia) Tiffany Cromwell
2024	(United States) Elliott Baring	(United States) Lauren Stephens
2023	(United States) David Brower	(Australia) Tiffany Cromwell
2022	(United States) Ethan Overson	(United States) Marisa Boaz
2021	(United States) Stephen Hyde	(United States) Lauren Stephens
2020	N/A (race cancelled)	N/A (race cancelled)
2019	(United States) Ashton Lambie	(United States) Lauren Stephens
2018	(United States) Matthew Accarrino	(United States) Erica Mueller
2017	(United States) Steven Baxter	(United States) Rebecca Rusch
2016	(United States) Guy Alvarez	(United States) Rebecca Rusch
2015	(United States) Austin Morris	(United States) Jennifer Rhoades
2014	(United States) David Wilson	(United States) Danielle Pellicano
2013	(United States) Mark Schloegel	(United States) Lynn Malir

=== Unbound Gravel XL ===
Before 2020, the race was known as the Dirty Kanza XL (or DK XL). This 350 mile race was first held in 2018. Results verified at Athlinks.

Year	Male	Female
2026	Robin Gemperle	Svenja Betz
2025	(Canada) Rob Britton	(United States) Heather Jackson
2024	(Germany) Sebastian Breuer	(Germany) Svenja Betz
2023	(United States) Logan Kasper	(United States) Kristen Legan
2022	(United States) William Harrison	(United States) Cynthia Frazier
2021	(United States) Taylor Lideen	(United States) Lael Wilcox
2020	N/A (race cancelled)	N/A (race cancelled)
2019	(United States) Jay Petervary	(United States) Lael Wilcox
2018	(United States) Matt Acker	(United States) Rebecca Rusch

=== Notable victories ===
- Rebecca Rusch is notable for placing first female in six events across three distances: XL race in 2018; 200 race in 2012 / 2013 / 2014; 100 race in 2016 and 2017.
- Lauren Stephens is notable for placing first female in three events of the 100 race: 2019 / 2021 / 2024.

== See also ==
- Ultra-distance cycling
- Leadville Trail 100 MTB, a mountain bike race in Leadville, Colorado
