= Sofía Gómez Villafañe =

Argentinian cross-country mountain biker

Sofía Gómez Villafane
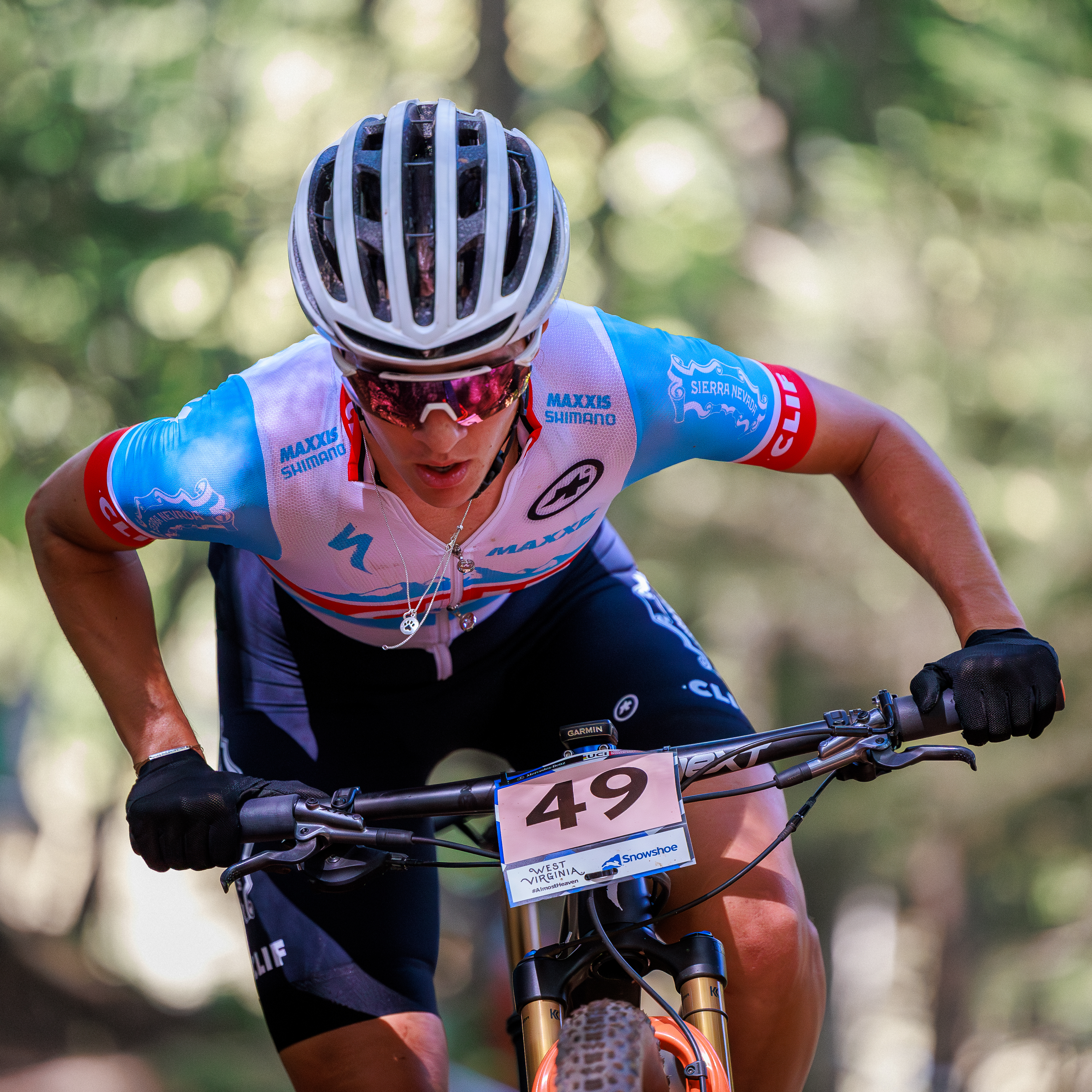

Personal information
- Born: 15 April 1994 (age 32) Esquel, Argentina

Cycling career
- Sport: Cycling
- Current team: Specialized Off-Road
- Disciplines: Mountain biking; Cyclo-cross
- Role: Rider

Major wins
- Cape Epic 2022, 2025 Unbound Gravel 2022 Leadville Trail 100 MTB 2023 Life Time Grand Prix 2023, 2024, 2025

Sofía Gómez Villafane (born 15 April 1994) is an Argentine cross-country mountain biker and cyclo-cross cyclist. She represented Argentina at the 2020 Summer Olympics in Women's cross-country.

== Career ==
She was raised in Esquel, Patagonia until she was twelve, before moving with her family to Los Gatos, California. The fifth child of six, she discovered mountain biking through the NorCal High School Mountain Bike Program, and her brother found her a bike on Craigslist for $500. She went on to compete at the collegiate level for Fort Lewis College in Durango, Colorado, where she received a Bachelor's in exercise science and a minor in business administration.

She races primarily in North America and is the 2019 Argentine national cross-country champion.

She won the 2019 Epic Rides series, defeating World Cup champion Kate Courtney in the final race. At the 2019 Pan American Games, in Lima, Peru, she won a silver medal in the cross-country race.

In 2021, she became the first female mountain biker to compete in the Olympics for Argentina since 2004 by qualifying to compete in the cross-country event.

In 2022, she raced on a duo team with Haley Batten to a victory in South Africa at the Cape Epic mountain bike stage race. She won it again in 2025 with Annika Langvad.

She is currently the 3x time defending champion of the Life Time Grand Prix.

== Personal life ==
She and her husband, Keegan Swenson, met through mountain biking in 2012. They regularly train and travel to competitions together.

Villafañe resides in Heber City, Utah, United States. She has a dual American and Argentine nationality.
