= Richard Feldman =

Richard Feldman may refer to:

- Richard Feldman (cyclist) (born 1969), American bicycle racer
- Richard Feldman (songwriter), American songwriter and producer
- Richard Feldman (philosopher), American philosopher and the interim president of the University of Rochester, 2017–2019
