= Cameron Jones (cyclist) =

New Zealand gravel cyclist

Personal information
- Born: 28 November 2000 (age 25)

Cycling career
- Sport: Cycling
- Current team: Scott–Shimano
- Disciplines: Gravel; Road; Mountain biking
- Role: Rider

Amateur team
- 2022–2023: RushVelo Ridley

Professional team
- Scott–Shimano

Major wins
- Life Time Grand Prix 2025

Cameron Jones (born 28 November 2000) is a New Zealand professional gravel cyclist.

In 2025, he won the Unbound Gravel 200, setting a course record of 8:37:09 in the process. Jones broke away from the group alongside Simon Pellaud 50 miles into the race, eventually dropping Pellaud by about 40 seconds in the final few miles. In 2025 Jones also took the overall series title in the Life Time Grand Prix.

== Major results ==
2024
4th Overall Oregon Trail Gravel

1st Stage 1

2025
1st Unbound Gravel 200
1st The Graveler
1st Crop Duster
