= Torbjørn Andre Røed =

Norwegian cyclist (born 1997)

Personal information
- Born: 8 March 1997 (age 29) Asker, Norway
- Height: 1.93 m (6 ft 4 in)
- Weight: 74 kg (163 lb)

Cycling career
- Sport: Cycling
- Current team: Trek Driftless
- Disciplines: Gravel; Road; Mountain biking
- Role: Rider

Amateur teams
- 2017–2019: Asker CK
- 2021: Above & Beyond Cancer Cycling p/b Bike World
- 2023–2024: Above & Beyond Cancer Cycling p/b Bike World

Professional teams
- 2022: Yoeleo Test Team p/b 4Mind
- 2023–: Trek Driftless

Torbjørn "Toby" Andre Røed (born 8 March 1997) is a Norwegian professional road and gravel cyclist.

Røed began cycling in Norway, competing in cyclo-cross, road racing and mountain biking. He moved to the United States in 2018, where he attended Colorado Mesa University. He started racing gravel in 2023. That season, he won the Big Sugar Gravel race, followed by Mid South in 2024.

== Major results ==
=== Road ===
2022
1st Boulder Roubaix
1st Pueblo Classic
3rd Overall Tour of the Gila

1st Stage 1

5th Overall Joe Martin Stage Race
6th Overall International Tour of Rhodes
7th Overall South Aegean Tour
2023
2nd Overall Tour of Szeklerland
3rd Overall Tour of the Gila

1st Stage 3

10th Overall Redlands Bicycle Classic
2024
7th Overall Redlands Bicycle Classic
7th Overall Tucson Bicycle Classic

=== Gravel ===
2023
1st Big Sugar Gravel
Belgian Waffle Ride

1st Kansas
3rd Arizona

2024
1st Mid South
UCI World Series

2nd La Monsterrato
3rd Alpine Gravel Challenge

2nd SBT GRVL
3rd Belgian Waffle Ride Arizona
2025
3rd Unbound Gravel 200
