= Northwest Athletic Clubs =

Northwest Athletic Clubs was a chain of health clubs or fitness centers in the Minneapolis-Saint Paul Metropolitan Area. The clubs began mostly as indoor tennis courts. The centers expanded into other areas of health and fitness.

The chain peaked the 1980s, when it was among the largest fitness center chains in the United States. Northwest's animated ownership duo Harv & Marv became local celebrities when they helped lure an NBA expansion franchise to the Twin Cities. Harv & Marv became owners of the Minnesota Timberwolves and built their venue The Target Center, which included the chain's Arena Club fitness center^{1}.

The Northwest Athletic chain of health clubs or fitness centers made slight changes to its name, and had several ownership changes. Northwest Athletic clubs was most recently operated by Wellbridge.

In 2006 Wellbridge closed or sold all centers under the banner to Lifetime Fitness.
