= Lauren De Crescenzo =

American cyclist

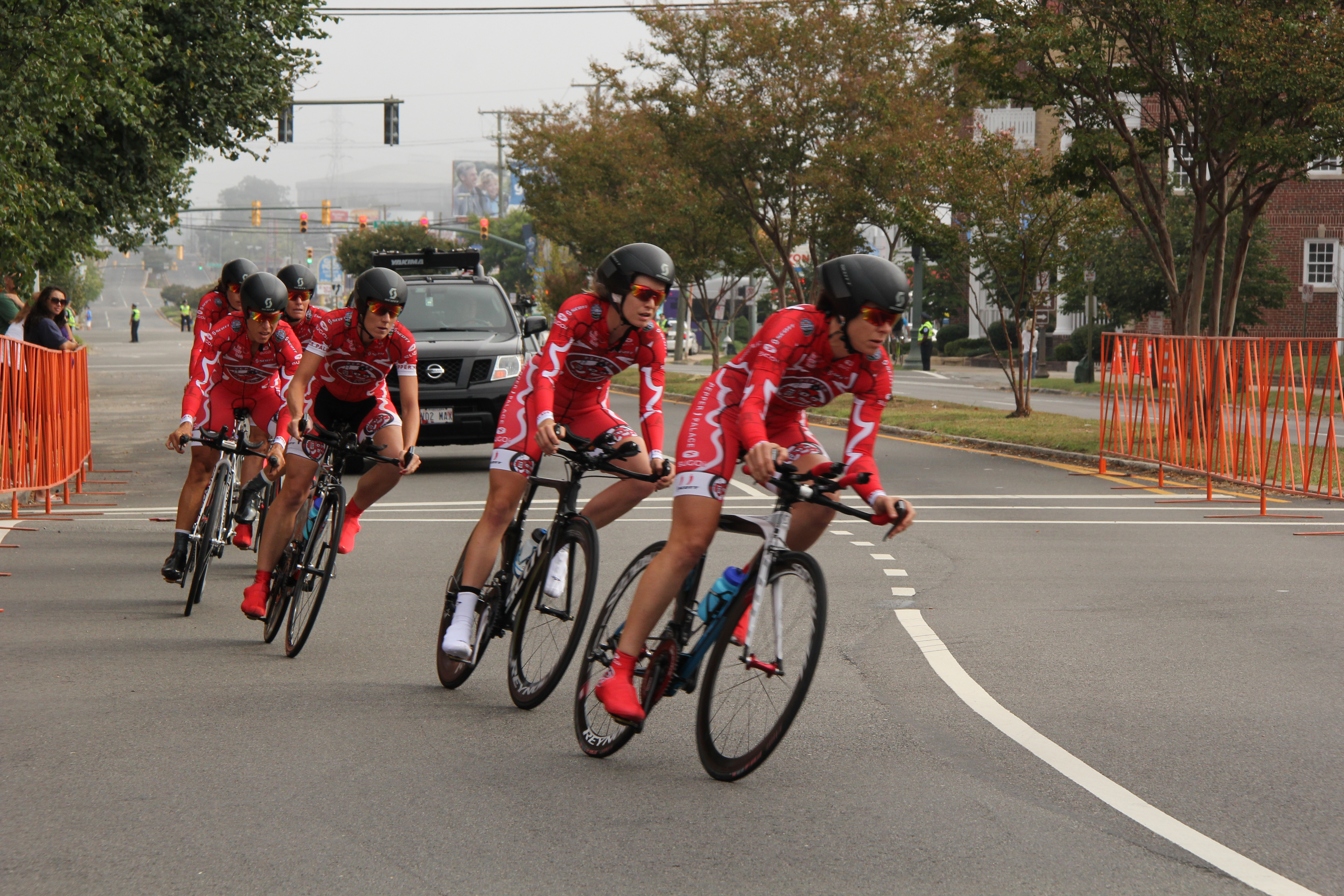
- Riding with her team at the 2015 UCI Road World Championships

Personal information
- Born: September 3, 1990 (age 36)

Cycling career
- Sport: Cycling
- Role: Rider

Amateur team
- 2014-2019: DNA Cycling p/b K4

Lauren De Crescenzo (born September 3, 1990) is an American professional racing cyclist. After a dedicated collegiate career, De Crescenzo won the 2021 Unbound Gravel race and placed as a runner-up in 2022. She overcame a traumatic brain injury from cycling to complete graduate school studying epidemiology and win races as a professional cyclist.

== Cycling career ==
De Crescenzo rode in the women's team time trial at the 2015 UCI Road World Championships.

Her college career included bronze medals in the 2018 USA Cycling Collegiate National Championship Road Race and Individual omnium, as well as gold in the 2019 Individual time trial. On May 31, 2020, De Crescenzo set the women's everesting world record, ascending Hogpen Gap in Blairsville, Georgia 24 times in nine hours and fifty-seven minutes. Her ride covered 111 miles with an average climb gradient of 9.83%. In June 2021, she won the 2021 Unbound Gravel 200 in 12:06:49. In 2022, she placed second in the race.

In 2023, De Crescenzo has continued to race on gravel roads and engage with sponsors on endorsement deals.

== Personal life ==
De Crescenzo is a graduate of Emory University. Lauren is married to doctor Jim Snitzer. During her first professional racing season in 2016, she suffered a traumatic brain injury (TBI) following a bike crash, after which she was placed in a medically induced coma for six days. De Crescenzo had a lengthy rehabilitation period in Colorado, after which she could relearn basic tasks and return to bicycle racing and graduate school. Following her recovery, De Crescenzo has gone on to finish graduate school, complete a fellowship at the Centers for Disease Control, and win more bike races.

== Major results ==
2024
1st Midsouth Gravel, Stillwater, Oklahoma
1st The Rad Dirt Fest, Trinidad, Colorado
1st Levi's Gran Fondo, Windsor, California
2nd US Pro Gravel National Championships, Gering, Nebraska
5th US Pro Road National Championships, Charleston, West Virginia
2023
1st Midsouth Gravel, Stillwater, Oklahoma
2nd Crusher in the Tushar, Beaver, Utah
1st The Rad Dirt Fest, Trinidad, Colorado
2nd place - Big Sugar, Bentonville, Arkansas
5th overall, Lifetime Grand Prix standings
2022
1st Midsouth Gravel, Stillwater, Oklahoma
1st Overall Tour of the Gila

1st Stage 2, The Inner Loop

2nd Overall 2022 Garmin Unbound Gravel 200
2nd US Pro National Championships Road Race, Knoxville, Tennessee
1st SBT GRVL, Steamboat Springs, Colorado
1st Gravel Worlds, Lincoln, Nebraska

2021
1st Overall 2021 Garmin Unbound Gravel 200
1st SBT GRVL, Steamboat Springs, Colorado
1st Gravel Worlds, Lincoln, Nebraska
1st The Rad Dirt Fest, Trinidad, Colorado
