= Willow Koerber =

American mountain biker

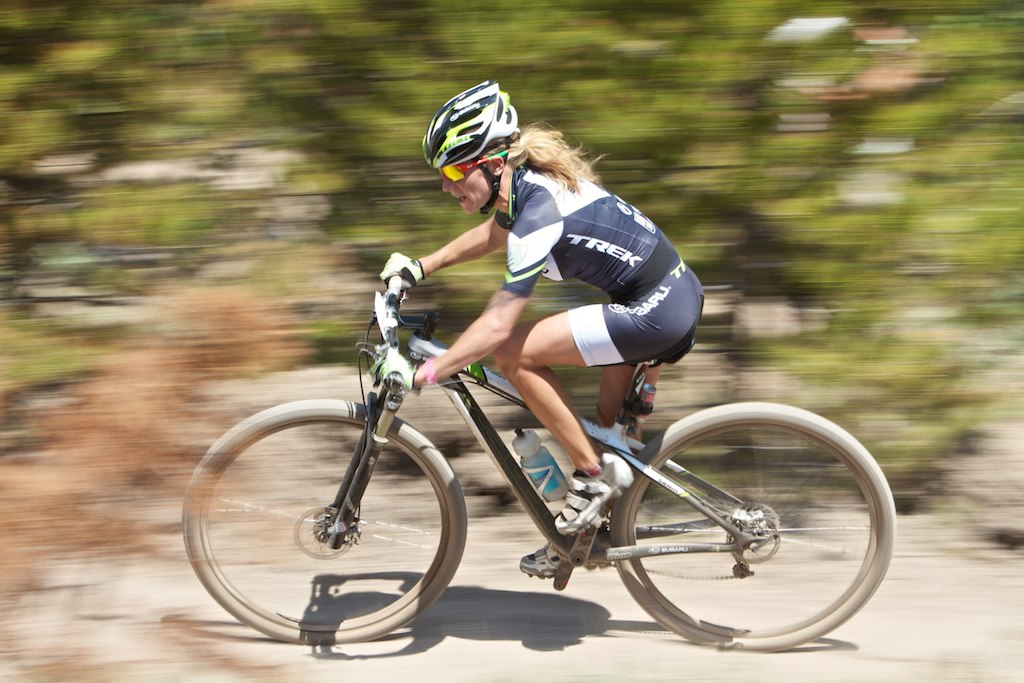
- Willow Koerber in 2010

Personal information
- Born: December 12, 1977 (age 48) Asheville, North Carolina, U.S.

Cycling career
- Sport: Cycling
- Discipline: Mountain bike
- Role: Rider
- Rider type: Cross-country
Medal record
Women's mountain bike racing
Representing United States
World Championships
Bronze medal – third place	2009 Canberra	Cross-country
Bronze medal – third place	2010 Mont-Sainte-Anne	Cross-country

Willow Koerber (born December 12, 1977) is an American former professional cross-country mountain biker. She most notably finished third at the 2009 and 2010 UCI Cross-country World Championships. She also finished second overall at the 2010 UCI Cross-country World Cup

Koerber is married to Myles Rockwell, a retired professional downhill mountain bike racer and world champion. In 2019, the couple created The Rockwell Ridewell Foundation, a 501(c)(3) organization for youth development.

== Major results ==
2005
3rd National XCO Championships
2007
3rd National XCO Championships
2009
2nd National XCO Championships
3rd UCI World XCO Championships
2010
2nd Overall UCI XCO World Cup
3rd UCI World XCO Championships
3rd National XCO Championships
