= Life Time Tri Series =

The Life Time Triathlon Series is a set of Olympic Distance triathlon races held annually in the United States and organized by Life Time Fitness.

The series began as a single race, the Lifetime Fitness Triathlon, in 2002 in Minneapolis, Minnesota. It gained immediate recognition from national and international competitors due to its professional prize purse, initially offering a $50,000 prize for the winner. The following year the prize was increased to a $500,000 total purse, with $50,000 each going to the male and female winner and a $200,000 prize to the overall winner in a gender handicapped elite category. By 2007 Life Time expanded the race into an Olympic-distance triathlon series, which originally began with race partnerships in New York, Chicago, Los Angeles and Dallas offering a professional prize purse at each of these races. Life Time furthered the professional experience in 2013 by partnering with Toyota to create a three race Toyota Triple Crown series using a similar gender equalizer component to award a single male/female champion.

In 2015 the triathlon series and the Life Time brand saw changes. In January, Life Time partnered with the World Triathlon Corporation (WTC), owners of the Ironman triathlon brand. As part of their agreement, some Life Time races would be rebranded under the Ironman banner, and WTC's Boulder Peak Triathlon would now fall under Life Time Fitness. Life Time also agreed to sponsor 34 Ironman 70.3 and Ironman Triathlon races. On March 6, Life Time announced that they would be cutting professional prize purses from all of its races, with exception to the New York City Triathlon, in order to focus on amateur participation in triathlon. This move followed similar moves in the sport of triathlon over the previous 12 months where brands such as Ironman, Rev3, Challenge Family, and the Hy-Vee Triathlon all reduced, redistributed, or eliminated professional prize money from their races. These changes came ahead of a March announcement that Life Time Fitness was to be acquired by private equity firms TPG Capital and Leonard Green & Partners in a leveraged buyout.

== Series ==
| Race | location |
|---|---|
| CapTex Triathlon | Austin, Texas |
| Trinona | Winona, Minnesota |
| Life Time Tri Minneapolis | Minneapolis, Minnesota |
| Boulder Peak Triathlon | Boulder, Colorado |
| New York City Triathlon | New York City, New York |
| Maple Grove Triathlon | Maple Grove, Minnesota |
| Chicago Triathlon | Chicago, Illinois |
| Life Time Tri Tempe | Tempe, Arizona |
| Escape to Miami Triathlon | Miami, Florida |
| Life Time Tri Oceanside | Oceanside, California |
| Life Time Tri Marquee | Tempe, Arizona |
| South Beach Triathlon | South Beach, Miami, Florida |
