= Melisa Rollins =

American cyclist

Personal information
- Full name: Melisa Rollins
- Born: November 19, 1995 (age 30) Provo, Utah, United States

Cycling career
- Sport: Cycling
- Current team: Virginia's Blue Ridge–Twenty28
- Disciplines: Gravel; Road
- Role: Rider
- Rider type: Multi-discipline

Melisa Rollins (born November 19, 1995) is an American professional racing cyclist who placed 5th at the Unbound 200 mile gravel race in 2022, she won the Leadville Trail 100 miles MTB in 2024 (168 km, +3400m, 23,5 km/h). Rollins rides for UCI Women's Team Virginia's Blue Ridge–Twenty28. She graduated from University of Utah in 2019 with a bachelors of science in chemistry. She works as a medical laboratory technologist. She lives in Utah.
