= Gravel cycling =

Bicycle sport mostly on gravel roads

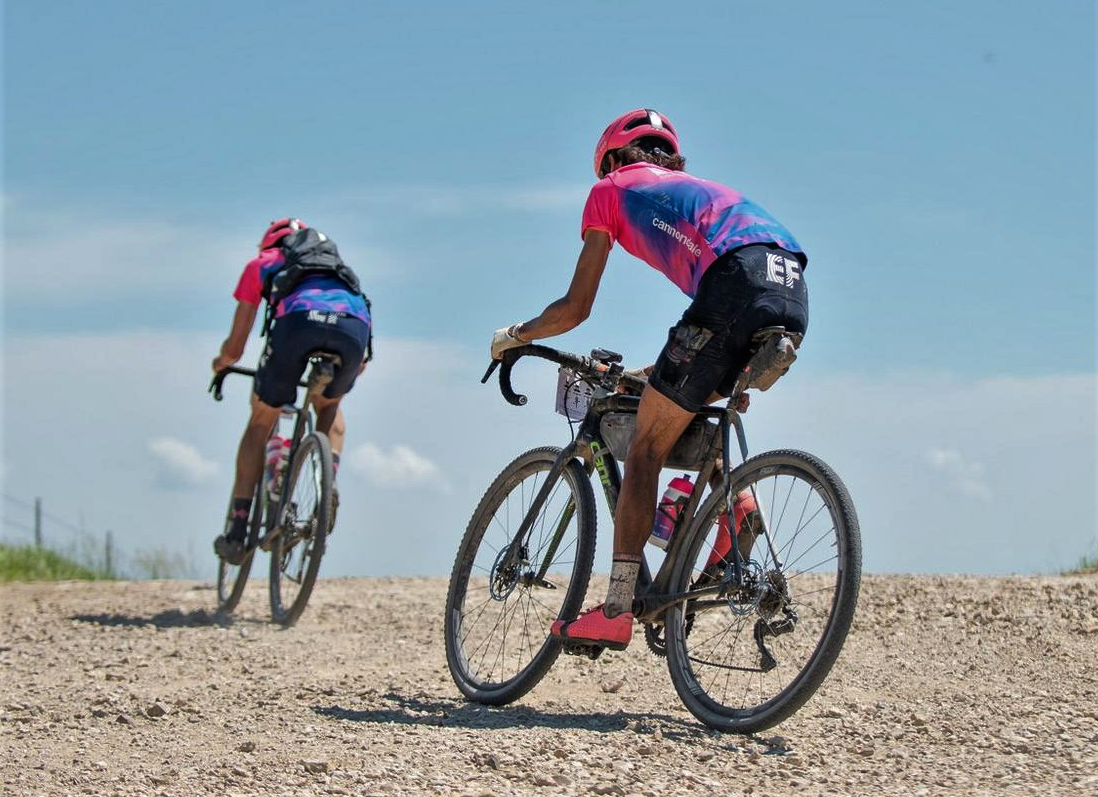
- EF Education First riders at the Unbound Gravel event
- Highest governing body: UCI
- First played: Since beginning of cycling; modern era began around 2006.

Presence
- Olympic: No
- World Championships: 2022, UCI Gravel World Championships

Gravel cycling, gravel biking or gravel grinding is a sport or a leisure activity in which participants ride bicycles on gravel roads or other unpaved surfaces. While often performed on a specially designed gravel bike, any bicycle capable of covering the terrain can be used.

Gravel cycling bridges the gap between road cycling and mountain biking, combining the efficiency of road cycling with the capability to ride on rough and loose terrain of mountain biking. It allows riders more freedom to choose routes than road cycling, without many of the physical and equipment-related barriers of mountain biking. Gravel cycling is nearly as old as cycling itself, with most significant developments in the racing side having occurred in the 20th century. Gravel racing as a discipline has its own global series and world championship.

== Overview ==
Although the term "gravel cycling" has only been in popular use since the early 2010s, the cycling style that it describes has been a significant part of the cycling world for much longer. Gravel cycling does not necessarily have to take place upon a gravel road. Rather, riding on any unpaved surface is considered gravel cycling. This includes gravel, dirt, rocky terrain, woodchips, and other uneven materials. Gravel routes frequently lead riders away from paved roads and other built environment, leaving them immersed in nature.

Gravel racing is a major part of the gravel cycling world. Some gravel races blur the line between ride and race, allowing riders to experience the thrill of a timed challenge while still enjoying the perseverance and camaraderie required to successfully complete a track. Gravel races occur globally throughout the entire year, although American and European races receive the majority of media coverage in the cycling world. A small number of road races embrace long stretches of unpaved gravel roads, most notably, the prestigious Italian classic Strade Bianche.

== History ==
=== End of 19th century and the beginning of 20th century ===
In the early days of road bike racing, most roads were not paved, so most races were held primarily on unpaved/dirt/gravel roads. One of the earliest examples is the Paris-Roubaix. The race started in 1896 and featured as much as 240 km of gravel and cobblestone roads, and even today has ~55 km of the route on non-asphalt roads.

Due to road infrastructure improving with time, road bike racing shifted almost entirely to paved roads. In United States of America, the use of paved roads was largely influenced by a group of cyclists called League of American Wheelmen, who advocated for improving road conditions. Racing bikes, as a result, were thereafter designed with narrow tires and lighter weight in mind. As a result, many "road racing bicycles" were no longer fit for off-road use.

=== 20th century ===
Next to road bike racing, separate off-road cycling disciplines emerged. In autumn and winter in a few European countries, cyclo-cross is a popular professional sport. Cyclo-crossers ride off-road (on grass, sand, mud...) on a variant of a road bicycle, on a closed circuit during a relatively short time (1 hour), and jump or carry their bikes over obstacles and steep climbs.

In the 1970s, mountain biking emerged. It took inspiration from gravel cycling in many ways, such as allowing riders to tackle tough, off road terrain and inspiring camaraderie between riders. Mountain biking ended up taking the off road aspect of gravel to the extreme, eventually requiring a different yet similar set of skills and equipment.

=== 21st century ===
In the 21st century, riding and racing road bikes on gravel roads gained popularity. Gravel cycling, as a mixture of road cycling, cyclo-cross and mountain biking became a new discipline of cycling.

Gravel cycling received significant attention during the COVID-19 pandemic. Lockdown procedures in many countries severely limited the number of activities many people could perform outside. Cycling as a whole requires little physical contact, which made it a popular option for people looking for something to do. Gravel cycling allowed riders to explore outside of any area they may have otherwise been unable to leave.

== Gravel racing ==
The distinguishing features of gravel races, also called gravel grinders, include long distances, often 160 to 320 kilometres (100 to 200 mi), primarily behind held on gravel roads, and mass starts including all categories of racers, similar to Gran Fondo rides.

The bicycles and courses in gravel racing vary widely, from road bicycles with wide tires to bicycles that share characteristics with mountain bikes. When selecting a bicycle for a race, cyclists must have detailed knowledge of the course. The type of terrain, weather, length, and time of year all play significant roles in deciding what equipment riders use.

=== Racing rules and culture ===
When taking Unbound Gravel as an example, there are checkpoints spaced about 80 kilometres (50 mi) apart for longer races, and riders must carry water and food, as well as fix their own tires and bikes.

If riders receive outside support at any location other than official checkpoints it will result in immediate disqualification. Riders may assist other riders by any means and at any time.

The culture of gravel biking has been a reason it has grown in popularity. Gravel races rarely call for a team of coaches and bicycle technicians. Gravel riders are generally focused on getting through a course rather than maintaining a pace during races. This gives way to camaraderie on the trail, and caters to a fun and relaxed atmosphere that is not always present in road and mountain bike races.

=== Regions ===
==== United States ====
The revival started in the Mid-West of the USA, where gravel cycling evolved from cyclists riding long stretches of gravel and fire roads. Some precursors to gravel racing in its current form include road races like the Tour of the Battenkill and Boulder–Roubaix (named after Paris–Roubaix) which are road races with gravel sections.

One of the premiere gravel races, Unbound Gravel in Emporia, Kansas (formerly called Dirty Kanza), started in 2006 and is 320 kilometres (200 mi) long. Unbound Gravel is a good example of how much gravel biking has grown in recent years: in 2006 there was a total of 34 riders that participated in the 320-kilometre (200 mi) race. In June 2019, 2,750 riders lucky enough to be picked from a lottery crossed the start line of the Dirty Kanza 200 and organizers had to introduce other mileage categories. Lifetime Fitness expanded their sponsorship in Gravel racing by creating a circuit in 2022 that Unbound Gravel is a part of along with other Lifetime owned races, the Life Time Grand Prix. This series in the inaugural series had $250,000 with 30 athletes in each the men's and women's field. The series has become the premier gravel racing series in the US with many international riders participating.

Barry-Roubaix is an up to 160-kilometre (100 mi) road/off-road cycling race in Barry County, Michigan. The event is known as the World's Largest Gravel Road Race.

The annual Arkansaw High Country Race in June is an approximately 1,600-kilometre (1,000 mi) self-supported (bikepacking) gravel race through the Ouachita and Ozark National Forests, with approximately 84,000 feet (26,000 m) of total elevation.

Starting in 2010, the Pirate Cycling League in Lincoln, Nebraska started Gravel Worlds. Their grassroots movement gathered steam and as of 2022 is one of the largest gravel races in the world.

In 2021, Gravel Worlds® received their registered trademark officially becoming THE Gravel Worlds. Thousands of riders from around the world race Gravel Worlds every year in Lincoln, Nebraska in late August. Champions of this event receive a world championship jersey, a pirate sword trophy, and the title of World Champion and "Captain of the Gravel Seas".

==== Europe ====
UK:

- The Gralloch is the UK’s premier gravel event and only UCI Gravel World Championships qualifier which is held annually on the tracks around Gatehouse of Fleet in South West Scotland.
- The Dirty Reiver is a 200-kilometre (120 mi) off-road timed cycling challenge that takes place in Hexham, England.

In Norway, Sweden and Finland, the Nordic Gravel Series are a series of gravel challenges.

==== Rest of the world ====
In 2021, the UCI announced they will sanction in 2022 both the Gravel World Series with about 18 races in 4 continents, and the UCI Gravel World Championships. This first edition of the Championship will be held in Veneto in October and the Dutch champion, Mathieu van der Poel is amongst the favoris with Peter Sagan, Nicolas Roche and Alex Howes.

Team USA has a team that races at Gravel Worlds. In 2023, the team was led by Lauren Stephens and Keegan Swenson, both national champions.

=== Gravel Rankings and World Championship ===
Gravel cycling as a whole has no governing body such as the UCI or USADA. Each race has its own rules, ethos, and character. Despite the balkanization of the races, a professional field of racers does exist, with each racer creating their own schedule of event to participate in. An independent organization called Pure Gravel has created a ranking system called the "Pure Gravel Power Rankings" in order to score and rank professional gravel racers across the myriad gravel races throughout the year. A King and Queen of gravel are crowned at the end of every calendar year.

== Gravel bicycle touring and bikepacking ==
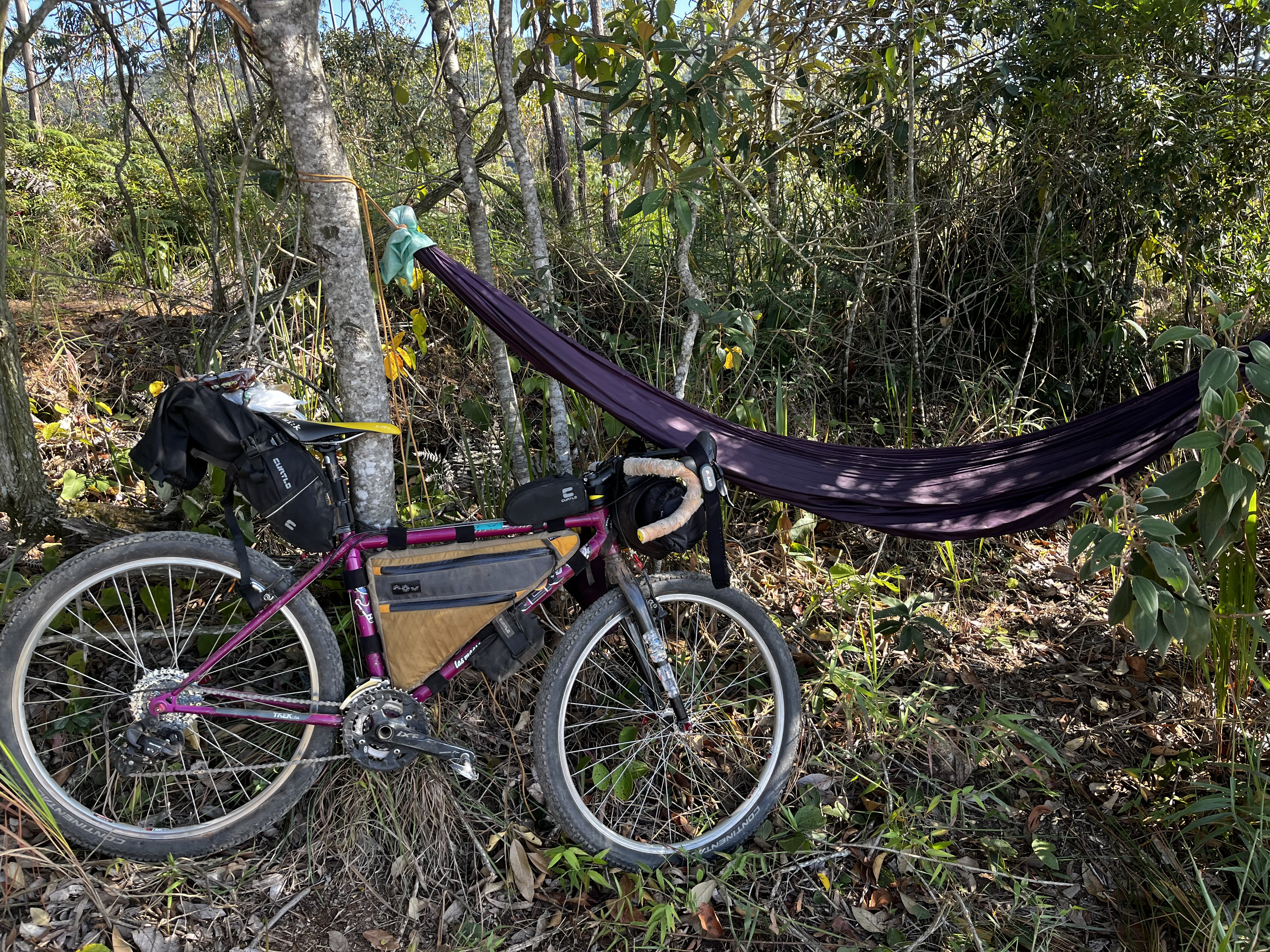
Bikepacking with a gravel bicycle and a hammock in Brazil

Riding on gravel roads has always been a part of bicycle touring, since its start in the 19th century. Due to a lack of paved roads in most regions, anyone partaking in an overnight bicycle ride had to prepare in a similar way to how modern gravel cyclists do. The bicycles they used shared characteristics with modern gravel bicycles. These bicycles were often sold as dedicated touring bicycles, and seen as variants of randonneur bicycles.

Since the 2010s, gravel cycling and gravel bicycles have been widely associated with bikepacking, a variant of bicycle touring. Bikepacking is a form of traveling by bike with lightweight luggage, mostly without bicycle racks or panniers. Also, bikepacking is usually off-road, making it more closely associated with gravel cycling.

== Equipment ==
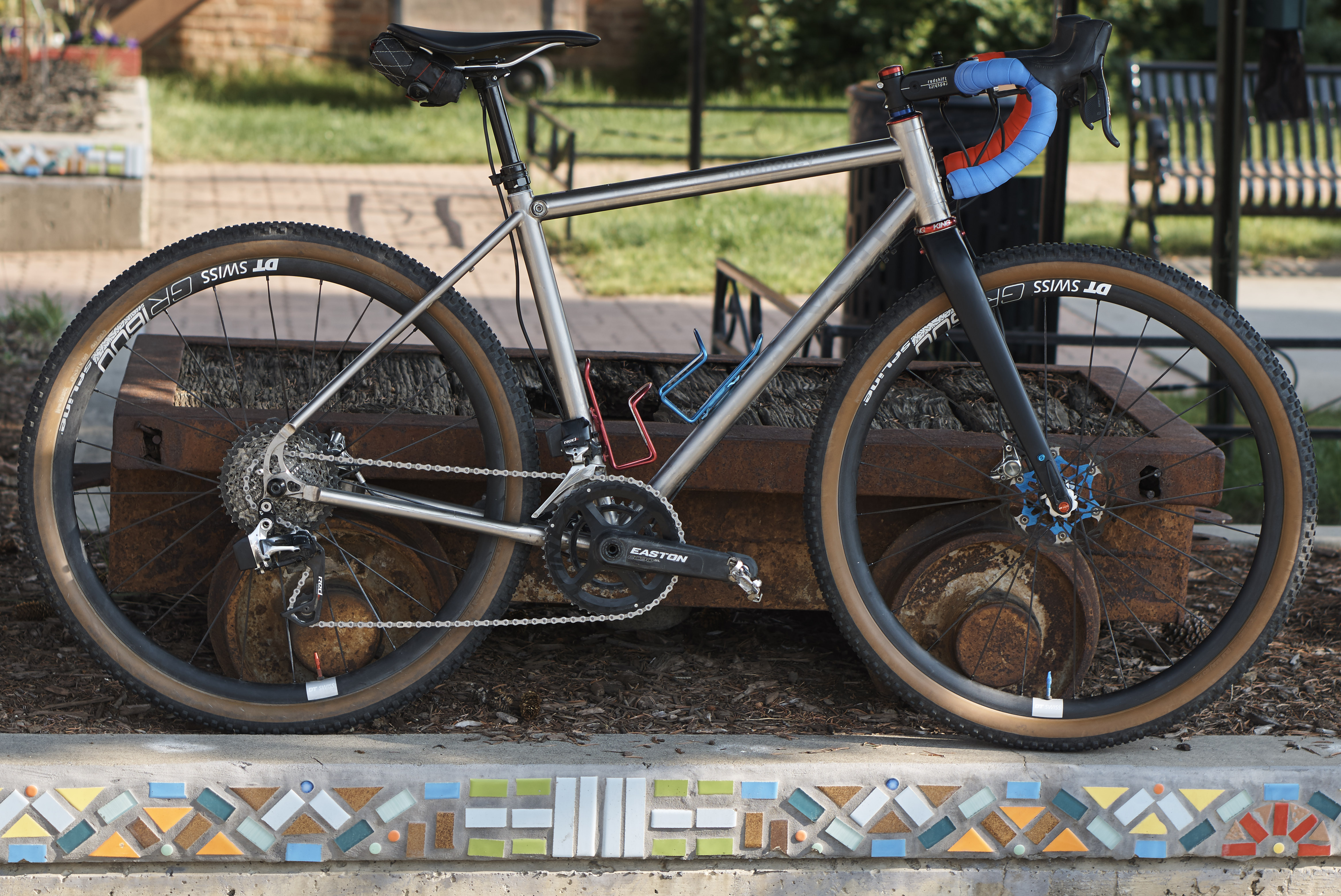
A gravel bicycle used for racing, with 46/30 chainrings and an 11-40 cassette giving a very wide spread of gears, and 650b wheels with 48 mm wide tires

=== Bicycle ===
The bicycles that cyclists use in gravel races and gravel rides can vary widely (can also be mountain bikes, cyclo-cross bicycles or racing bicycles with wider tires, depending on the conditions).

However, since the 2010s, a dedicated type of bicycle is marketed as gravel bike to cover the new cycling discipline. Dedicated gravel group sets are available from three major vendors (Shimano, SRAM and Campagnolo). Compared to road groupsets, gravel groupsets tend to have features from MTB groupsets like a clutched rear derailleur (to keep chain tension on when riding on uneven surfaces to avoid chain jumping), lower gearing options (lower than 1:1, bigger sprockets and/or smaller chainrings, like for example a super-compact 48/32T or 46/30T chainset and a 11-34T cassette), and a wider side-to-side chainline for more tire clearance.

Gravel bikes, at first glance, look very similar to road bikes with their drop bars and lack of front or rear suspension.

Where gravel bikes differ from road bikes is that the bars are usually wider, geometry is adapted to be more comfortable riding offroad for long periods of time and modern gravel bikes will also feature a 1x drivetrain removing the front derailleur. Wheels are generally wider and forks and rear triangle and seats stays will allow for much wider tires to cope with the terrain and requirements of riding off-road. It is common for a gravel bike to have 35 to 50 millimeter (mm) tires, compared to 25–32 mm for a road bike.

The relaxed geometry of mountain bikes is the foundation of gravel bike frames but gravel bikes are lighter, faster and more responsive than a mountain bike. Gravel bikes also use characteristics of both cyclocross and road bikes for better comfort on long rides and the wheel clearance to accommodate rides done in torrential conditions (heavy rain).

Still, gravel bikes vary, and the different models cover a range between road racing bicycles and mountain bikes.

=== Tires ===
Gravel tires come in a variety of sizes and widths. The most common are 650b (27.5 inches) and 700c (29 inches). Tire width can vary from 30 to 50 millimeters (mm). The lower end of that range is closer to road bike tires, making them better suited for light off-road situations. The wider side approaches mountain bike tires and is well adapted to use on trails with large pebbles, sticks, and worse traction. If a tire becomes too wide, it won't fit in some bike frames, making maximum tire width a significant factor for riders purchasing new bicycles.

The rise of tubeless tires has not gone unnoticed in the gravel scene. Tubeless sealant's ability to effortlessly seal punctures, as well as run lower tire pressure has made it more common than traditional inner tubes in modern gravel cycling.

=== Bags ===
Many modern gravel bikes have a large number of mounting points for external frame storage. Bags are not required for shorter rides, but any gravel bicycle touring or bikepacking ride will doubtlessly feature them. One option is top tube bags. This allows for easy access to a mobile phone, wallet, or food, although it is limited by low capacity. Frame bags solve this issue of capacity. They can be made in a variety of shapes and sizes to suit any rider's need. Some bags mount behind the seat and can carry sleeping and cooking equipment, but a complete dismount is necessary to access them.

Some riders forgo bags on their bicycles at all, instead opting for a fanny pack or backpack.
