= Amity Rockwell =

American cyclist

Personal information
- Full name: Amity Rockwell
- Born: May 28, 1993 (age 33) Berkeley, California, United States

Cycling career
- Sport: Cycling
- Current team: Easton Overland
- Disciplines: Mountain biking; Road
- Role: Rider

Amateur teams
- 2018: The Meteor
- 2019–: Easton Overland

Professional team
- 2017–2019: Team Illuminate

Amity Rockwell (also known as Amity Gregg; born May 28, 1993) is an American professional racing cyclist, who currently rides in mountain bike racing for the Easton Overland team. In 2019, she won the women's edition of the Dirty Kanza 200 gravel race.

In road racing, Rockwell was a member of UCI Women's Team Team Illuminate between 2017 and 2019.
