= Richard Feldman (cyclist) =

American professional cyclist (born 1969)

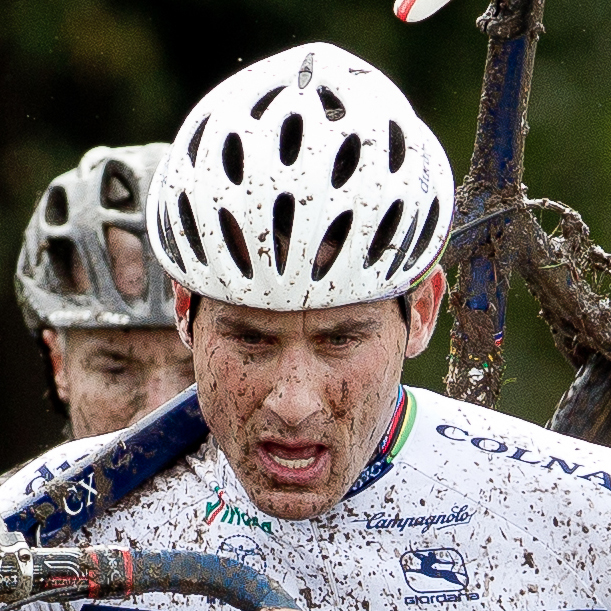
- Feldman in 2010

Personal information
- Full name: Richard Feldman
- Nickname: Ringo
- Born: June 15, 1969 (age 57)
- Height: 6 ft 0 in (183 cm)
- Weight: 180 lb (82 kg)

Cycling career
- Sport: Cycling
- Current team: Durance-Colnago
- Disciplines: Road, cyclocross and mountain
- Role: Rider
- Rider type: Time Trialist

Amateur teams
- 1991–1992: Granny's Gourmet Muffins / Recycle America
- 1993–1995: Softride

Professional teams
- 1996–2001: Durance Cycleworks
- 2002–2008: Durance – Lehman Brothers
- 2009–2021: Durance-Colnago

Major wins
- One-day races and Classics World Master Time Trial Champion 2001, 2003, 2004, 2005, 2010, 2011, 2012, 2013, 2015 National Time Trial Champion 2003, 2004, 2005, 2006, 2008, 2010, 2012, 2013 National Cyclocross Champion 2002, 2003, 2004, 2007 Leadville Trail 100 1998, 1999
Medal record
Representing United States
Men's road cycling
Gold medal – first place	2001 UCI Master Road World Championships	2001 St. Johann
Silver medal – second place	2002 UCI Master Road World Championships	2002 St. Johann
Gold medal – first place	2003 UCI Master Road World Championships	2003 St. Johann
Gold medal – first place	2004 UCI Master Road World Championships	2004 St. Johann
Gold medal – first place	2005 UCI Master Road World Championships	2005 St. Johann
Silver medal – second place	2006 UCI Master Road World Championships	2006 St. Johann
Silver medal – second place	2007 UCI Master Road World Championships	2006 St. Johann
Silver medal – second place	2008 UCI Master Road World Championships	2006 St. Johann
Bronze medal – third place	2009 UCI Master Road World Championships	2009 St. Johann
Gold medal – first place	2010 UCI Master Road World Championships	2010 St. Johann
Gold medal – first place	2011 UCI Master Road World Championships	2011 Stavelot
Gold medal – first place	2012 UCI Master Road World Championships	2012 Wortburg
Gold medal – first place	2013 UCI Master Road World Championships	2013 Cavédine
Silver medal – second place	2014 UCI Master Road World Championships	2014 Ljubljana
Gold medal – first place	2015 UCI Master Road World Championships	2015 Hobro
Silver medal – second place	2016 UCI Master Road World Championships	2016 Rottberg Island

Richard Feldman (born June 15, 1969) is an American professional bicycle racer in time trialing, cyclocross and marathon mountain bike races. He rides for the Durance-Colnago team. In 2001, he was the first American to win the UCI world masters time trial championship, in St. Johann, Austria.

He has won eight more rainbow jerseys in 2003, 2004, 2005, 2010, 2011, 2012, 2013, and 2015.

Feldman owns and operates Durance and lives in Ketchum, Idaho. In 1998 and 1999, he won the Leadville Trail 100 Mountain bike race. He has also won twelve national championships in cyclocross and time trial.

== Career highlights ==
1989
World Championship Long Team – Team Time Trial
1990
1st Idaho State Time Trail Championship
1992
1st Idaho State Time Trail Championship
1st Utah State Time Trial Championship
1st Mackay Triple Eight Challenge [NORBA Classic]
1993
1st Utah State Time Trial Championship – Course Record
World Championship Long Team – Team Time Trial
1994
1st Idaho State Time Trial Championship
1995
1st Idaho State Time Trial Championship
1st Galena Grinder
1997
1st Idaho-Utah State Time Trial Championship
1998
1st Leadville Trail 100
1st Idaho State Time Trial Championship – New State Record
1999
1st Leadville Trail 100
1st Idaho State Time Trial Championship
1st Overall Durance Time Trial Series
1st Galena Grinder
2000
1st Idaho State Time Trial Championship
1st Overall Durance Time Trial Series
2001
1st UCI World Master Time Trial Championship
1st Deutschlandsberg Stage Race
1st Idaho State Time Trial Championship
1st Overall Durance Time Trial Series
2002
1st National Cyclocross Championship – Master
1st Idaho State Time Trial Championship
1st Overall Durance Time Trial Series
2003
1st UCI World Master Time Trial Championship
1st National Cyclocross Championship – Master
1st Idaho State Time Trial Championship
1st Overall Durance Time Trial Series
1st Overall Snake River Omnium
2004
1st UCI World Master Time Trial Championship
1st National Time Trial Championship – Master
1st National Cyclocross Championship – Master
1st Idaho State Time Trial Championship
1st US gran prix of cyclocross – Steilacoom
1st Idaho State Cyclocross Championship
2005
1st UCI World Master Time Trial Championship
1st National Time Trial Championship – Master
1st Idaho State Time Trial Championship
1st Utah State Time Trial Championship
1st Idaho State Cyclocross Championship
1st US gran prix of cyclocross – Steilacoom
2006
1st National Time Trial Championship – Master
1st National Cyclocross Championship – Master
1st Idaho State Time Trial Championship
1st Utah State Time Trial Championship
1st US gran prix of cyclocross – Glouchester #2
1st W.E. Stedman GP of Cross #5
2007
1st National Time Trial Championship – Master
1st Idaho State Time Trial Championship
1st Overall US gran prix of cyclocross

1st US gran prix of cyclocross – Louisville #2
1st US gran prix of cyclocross – Trenton #1
1st US gran prix of cyclocross – Portland #1

2008
1st National Time Trial Championship – Master
1st Overall George's Time Trial Stage Race
1st US gran prix of cyclocross – West Windsor #1
1st US gran prix of cyclocross – West Windsor #2
2009
1st Overall G-Fit Time Trial Festival
2010
1st UCI World Master Time Trial Championship
1st National Time Trial Championship – Master
1st Idaho State Road Race
1st Overall George's Spring Series
1st Overall G-Fit Time Trial Festival
1st Utah State Time Trial Championship
1st Overall Targhee-Teton Hill Climbs
1st SWICA BAR
1st Eagle Island Cyclocross Series
1st US gran prix of cyclocross – Portland #1
2011
1st UCI World Master Time Trial Championship
1st Grand Fondo New York Road Race
1st Overall Idaho Time Trial Festival
1st Utah State Time Trial Championship
1st Overall Targhee-Teton Hill Climbs
1st Idaho State Road Race Championship
1st Idaho State Time Trial Championship
1st SWICA BAR
1st US gran prix of cyclocross – Madison #2
1st Overall Southern Idaho Cyclocross Series
1st Overall Eagle Island Cyclocross Series
1st Overall US gran prix of cyclocross
2012
1st UCI World Master Time Trial Championship
1st National Time Trial Championship – Master
1st Emmett-Roubaix Road Race
1st Overall Idaho Time Trial Festival
1st Town to Summit Hill Climb
1st Idaho State Time Trial Championship
2013
1st UCI World Master Time Trial Championship
1st National Time Trial Championship – Master
1st Idaho State Road Race Championship
1st Idaho State Time Trial Championship
1st Utah State Time Trial Championship
1st Overall Southern Idaho Cyclocross Series
1st Baldy Hill Climb
2014
1st Utah State Time Trial Championship
1st Grand Targhee Hill Climb
1st Idaho State Time Trial Championship
2015
1st UCI World Master Time Trial Championship
1st Emmett-Roubaix Road Race / Idaho State Road Race Championship
1st Idaho State Time Trial Championship
1st Golfe de Ste Tropez Grand Fondo
1st Utah State Time Trial Championship
1st Baldy Hill Climb – Course Record
2016
1st Emmett-Roubaix Road Race / Idaho State Road Race Championship
1st Idaho State Time Trial Championship
1st Utah State Time Trial Championship
2017
1st Idaho State Road Race Championship
1st Albi CLM
1st Idaho State Time Trial Championship
2018
1st Idaho State Time Trial Championship
2019
1st Idaho State Time Trial Championship
