= Samuel Schultz =

American cross-country mountain biker

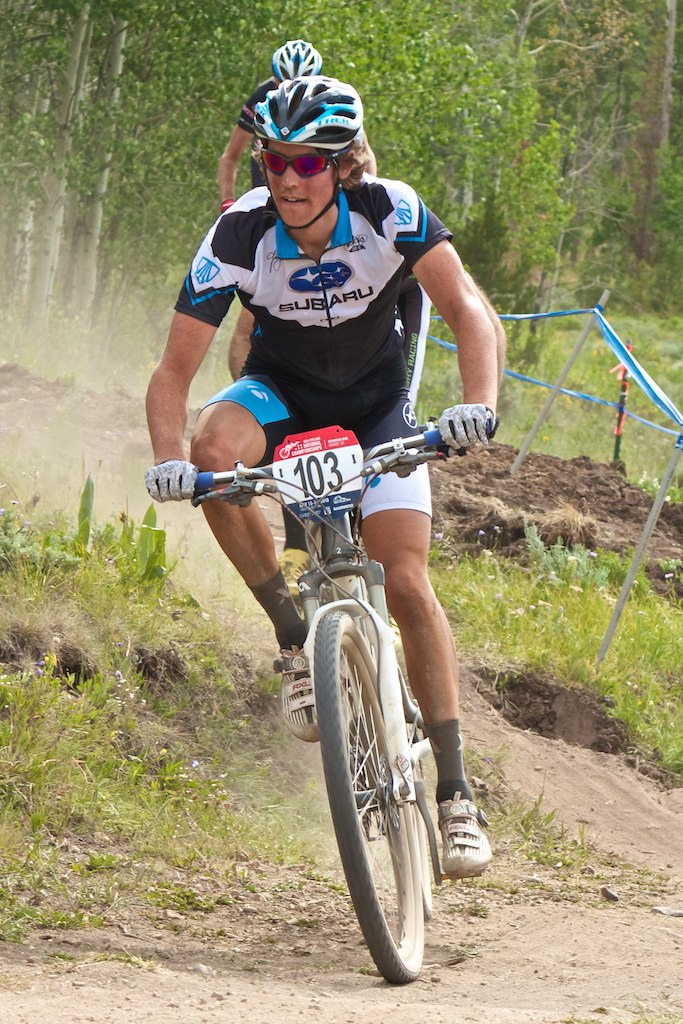

Samuel "Sam" Schultz (born December 11, 1985, in Missoula, Montana) is an American cross-country mountain biker. At the 2012 Summer Olympics, he competed in the Men's cross-country at Hadleigh Farm, finishing in 15th place.

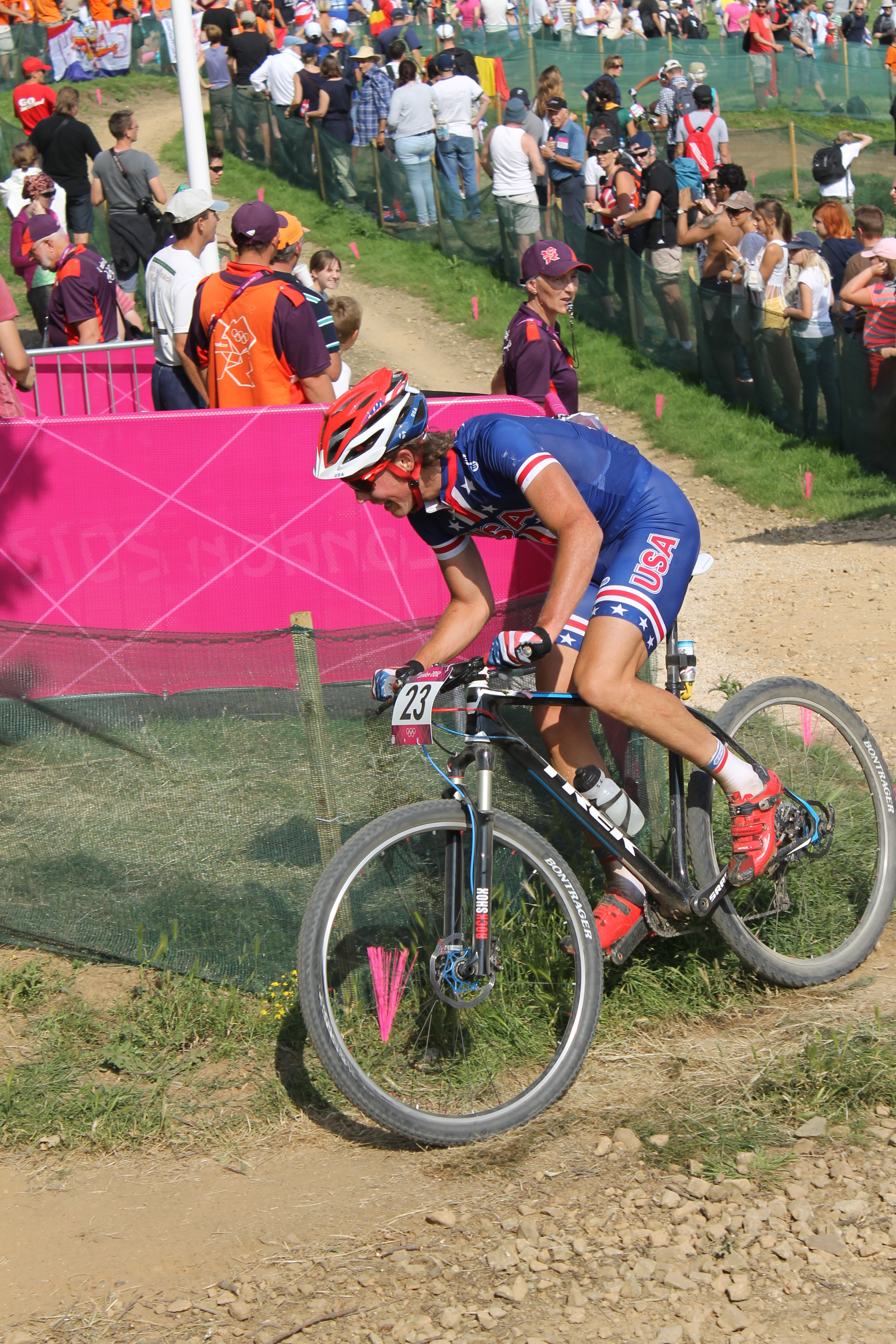
Samuel Schultz at the 2012 Summer Olympics
