= Chloe Woodruff =

American cross-country cyclist

Chloe Woodruff (born July 21, 1987) is an American cross-country cyclist. She placed 14th in the women's cross-country race at the 2016 Summer Olympics.

She has qualified to represent the United States at the 2020 Summer Olympics.
