= Marla Streb =

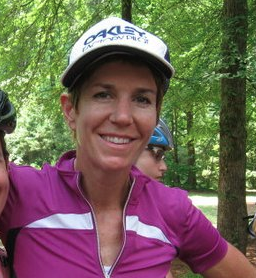
- Streb in 2014

Personal information
- Born: 24 June 1965 (age 61)

Cycling career
- Sport: Cycling
- Discipline: Mountain biking
- Role: Rider

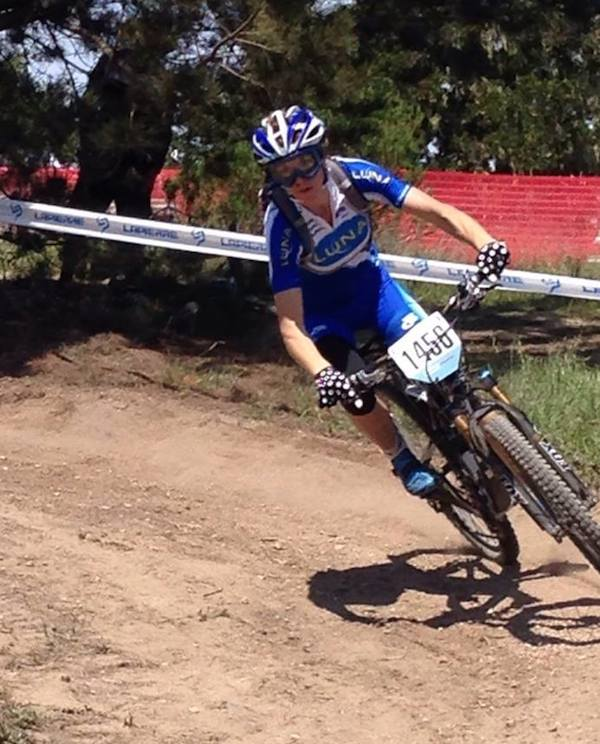
Streb racing the enduro at the 2014 Sea Otter Classic

Marla Streb (born June 24, 1965) is an American professional cyclist and was inducted in the mountain bike hall of fame in 2013. She has won a World Cup downhill in 2005 (Austria), twice won the Single Speed World Championship in 1999 and 2006 and also won the X-Games in 1999. Streb has written and published two books, appeared on the cover of Outside Magazine, and has been featured on network television and movies such as the IMAX movie Top Speed. Streb raced for the Clif Pro Team for much of her professional career (2002-2009)

After retiring from racing, Streb also worked as the PR and media liaison with the all-women's professional trade team, The Clif Pro Team, and contracted as an LCI instructor with Bike Maryland, a non-profit cycling advocacy organization. Streb was the founder and owner of Baltimore, Maryland's first and only bicycle cafe, called HandleBar Cafe (2012-2020). Marla also owned a natural-surface trail design company called Streb Trail Systems in Costa Rica.

Marla currently runs a mountain bike touring and coaching business called Streb Mountain Bike Adventures in California.

== Palmarès ==
1998

- X GAMES Champion – Crested Butte, CO
- 1st, NORBA Series – Seven Springs, PA
- 1st, NORBA Series Finals – Durango, Colorado, USA
- 1st, NORBA Series – Mt. Snow, VT
- 1st, Sea Otter Classic – Monterey, CA

1999

- Single Speed World Champion – Rancho Cucamonga, CA, USA

2000

- 1st NORBA Series – Mammoth Mt., CA
- 1st NORBA Series – Deer Valley, UT
- 3rd, UCI World Championships – Sierra Nevada, Spain
- 3rd, UCI World Cup – Arai, Japan

2001

- 1st, NORBA Series, Big Bear Lake, CA
- 1st, Sea Otter Classic, Monterey, CA

2003

- U.S. National Downhill Champion
- World Cup Downhill Finals Champion- Kaprun, Austria
- 1st NORBA Series – Snowshoe, W VA
- 1st NORBA Series – Mt. Snow, VT
- 3rd, UCI World Cup – Mount Ste. Anne, Canada

2004

- U.S. National Downhill Champion
- U.S. National Super-Downhill Champion

2005

- Single Speed World Champion – State College, PA
- 1st, Sea Otter Classic- Single Speed Cross Country
- 1st, NORBA Super-Downhill – Arizona
- 1st, Crankworx Enduro Downhill, Whistler-Blackcomb, BC

2014

- 1st, Mayhem Enduro – The Wilds, Ohio
- 1st, OverMountain Enduro- Northfield, NH

2015

- 1st, Mayhem Enduro- The Wilds, Ohio
- 4th, Sea Otter Classic Enduro- Monterey, CA

2016

- 1st, Mayhem Enduro- The Wilds, Ohio
