= Adam Craig (cyclist) =

American cyclist (born 1981)

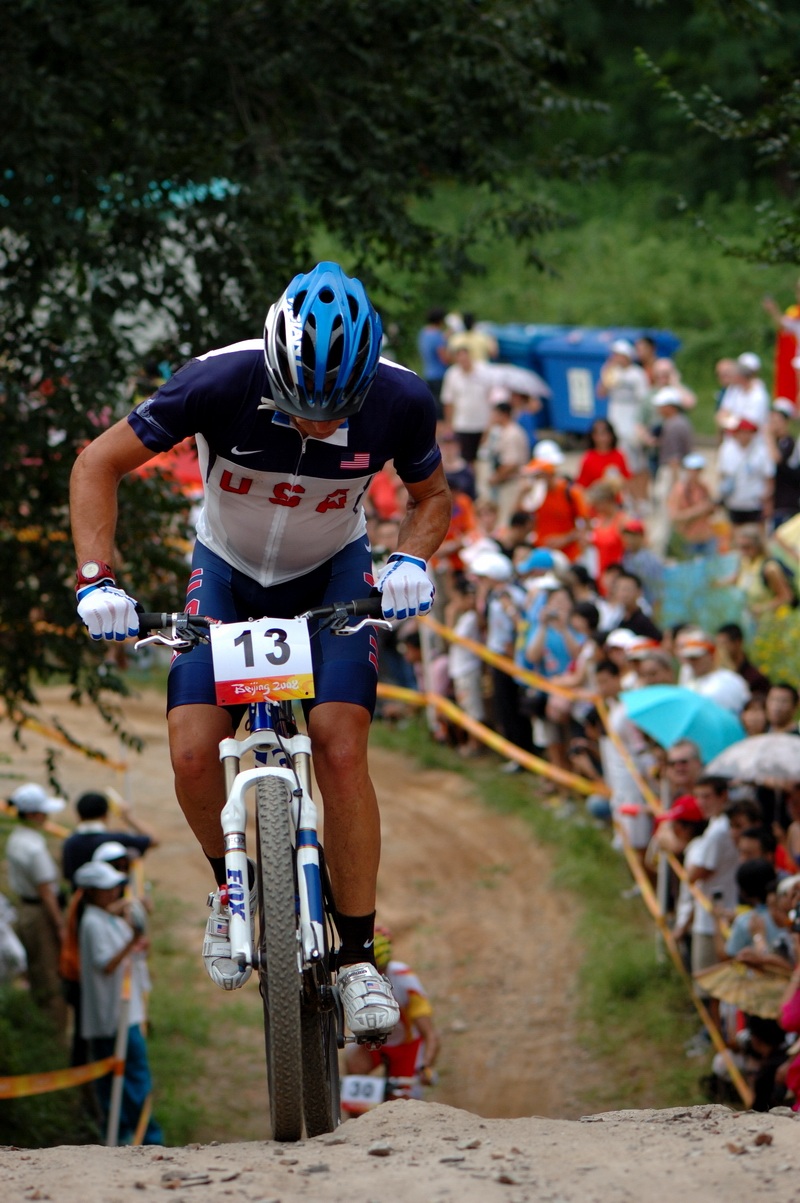

Personal information
- Born: August 15, 1981 (age 44) New York, New York, U.S.
Medal record
Men's cycling
Representing the United States
Pan American Games
Gold medal – first place	2007 Rio de Janeiro	Mountainbike

Adam Craig (born August 15, 1981, in Bangor, Maine) is a professional mountain biker currently living in Bend, Oregon. Originally from Corinth, Maine, Craig was educated at the University of Maine. He is a three-time Under 23 Cross-country National Champion, 2007 and 2008 National Champion, and represented the United States at the 2008 Beijing Olympic Games.

Adam Craig competed in several events at the 2013 Sea Otter Classic using a Mongoose Beast, a 47 lb singlespeed fatbike sold for $200 at Walmart. Craig gave interviews under the pseudonym Manuel Beastley and competed wearing Giant Factory Team casual apparel.

Adam Craig won Single Speed Cyclocross World Championship five times.

== See also ==
- Cycling at the 2008 Summer Olympics – Men's cross-country
