= Kate Courtney (cyclist) =

American cyclist (born 1995)

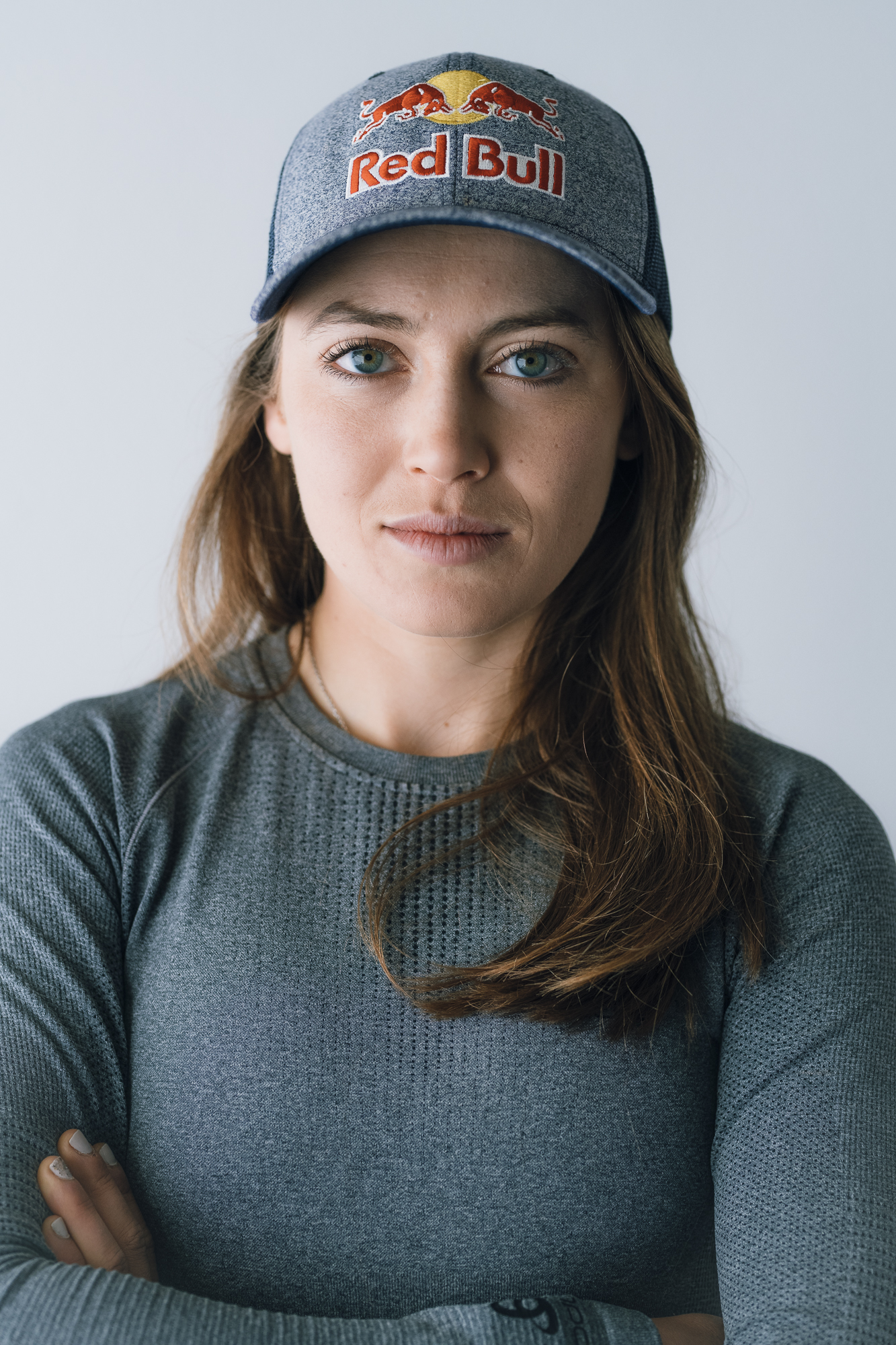
- Kate Courtney poses for portrait with Red Bull while training in Sedona, Arizona on February 27, 2019.

Personal information
- Born: October 29, 1995 (age 30) San Francisco, United States
- Height: 5 ft 4 in (163 cm)
- Weight: 52 kg (115 lb)

Cycling career
- Sport: Cycling
- Current team: FDJ United–Suez
- Disciplines: Cross-Country; Mountain bike racing; Road
- Role: Rider

Major wins
- Mountain bike World Marathon Championships (2025) World XC Championships (2018) National XC Championships (2017, 2018) XC World Cup (2019) 3 individual wins (2019) Cape Epic (2018) Road One-day races and classics National Road Race Championships (2026)
Medal record
Women's mountain bike racing
Representing United States
World Championships
Gold medal – first place	2025 Valais	Marathon
Gold medal – first place	2018 Lenzerheide	Cross-country
Silver medal – second place	2021 Val di Sole	Team relay

Kate Courtney (born October 29, 1995) is an American cross-country mountain bike cyclist.

== Early life ==
Born to Maggie and Tom Courtney in October 1995, Kate Courtney grew up in Marin County, California at the base of Mount Tamalpais, which is considered to be the birthplace of mountain biking. Courtney was introduced to cycling at a young age by her father and they would ride a mountain-bike tandem up Mount Tamalpais together. She joined her school mountain bike team at Branson High School. While at high school, Courtney competed for the USA National Team and Whole Athlete Development Team in international events. In 2012, Courtney became the first American woman to win a UCI Mountain Bike World Cup in the Junior category.

In 2013, Courtney went to Stanford University to study human biology. In the same year, she signed her first professional contract with Specialized Bicycles.

== Professional cycling career ==
After graduating from Stanford University in 2017, Courtney began racing full-time and in her first full season in 2017 won four U23 World Cups and the U23 World Cup overall title, and took a silver medal at the U23 world championship. She is a two-time US cross-country (XC) national champion, having won the title in 2017 and 2018. Courtney participated at the 2018 UCI Mountain Bike World Championships, winning the gold medal in the women's elite cross country race. It was the first such win for an American since 2001.

In 2018, Courtney took part in the Cape Epic Stage race with her Specialized teammate Annika Langvad; the teammates won seven individual stages and took the Overall team victory.

In 2019, Courtney left Specialized for the Scott-SRAM team headed by Swiss mountain bike legend, Thomas Frischknecht . She ended the season as the UCI World Cup series winner.

In 2020, Courtney appeared in a concussion education video as part of the CrashCourse virtual reality series for TeachAids. In 2024, Courtney appeared alongside Tom Cruise in a video promoting the 2028 Summer Olympics which was shown at the 2024 Summer Olympics closing ceremony.

In June 2026, Courtney won the road race at the United States National Road Race Championships. The following month, FDJ–Suez announced that the team had signed Courtney with immediate effect through December 2028.

== Major results ==
=== Mountain bike ===
2016
2nd Overall UCI Under-23 XCO World Cup

1st Cairns
2nd Lenzerheide

2017
1st Cross-country, National Championships
1st Overall UCI Under-23 XCO World Cup

1st Nové Město
1st Lenzerheide
1st Mont-Sainte-Anne
1st Val di Sole
2nd Albstadt
2nd Vallnord

2018
1st Cross-country, UCI World Championships
1st Cross-country, National Championships
1st Overall Cape Epic (with Annika Langvad)
2019
1st Overall UCI XCO World Cup

1st Albstadt
1st Nové Město
1st Les Gets

2021
Swiss Bike Cup

1st Savognin
2nd Leukerbad

Internazionali d’Italia Series

1st Legend Cup

2nd Team relay, UCI World Championships
2022
Swiss Bike Cup

1st Basel

2023
Pan American Championships

1st Short track
1st Cross-country

2025
1st Marathon, UCI World Championships
1st Leadville Trail 100 MTB

=== Road ===
2026 (1 pro win)
1st Road race, National Championships
1st Stage 4 Tour de Feminin
4th Tre Valli Varesine
