= Athlinks =

- Website type: Social network service
- Owner: Life Time Fitness
- Website: www.athlinks.com
- Registration: Yes
- Launched: 2001; 25 years ago

Athlinks is a free-of-charge social networking website aimed at competitive endurance athletes. It primarily presents race results for running, swimming, cycling, mountain biking, triathlon, and adventure racing. It is also represented as tool for athletes to connect with other competitors and enthusiasts locally.

== About ==
Athlinks claims to have the "most comprehensive database of endurance race results and events anywhere in the world". Users can mark their own race results, and build a thorough list of their race history.

The website also has a "rivals" feature, where a user can compare themselves to athletes with similar results. Like other social network websites, a user maintains a group of "friends". In addition, users may keep a training log, list their gear items, upload photos, and present a schedule of future events.

In February 2013, ChronoTrack, a provider of timing, race management and live race services, announced that it had acquired Athlinks.
