= Jeremy Horgan-Kobelski =

American cyclist

Personal information
- Born: August 11, 1978 (age 48) Denver, Colorado, United States

Cycling career
- Sport: Cycling

Jeremy Horgan-Kobelski (born August 11, 1978) is an American cyclist. He competed in the men's cross-country mountain biking event at the 2004 Summer Olympics.
