= Howard Grotts =

American mountain bike cyclist (born 1993)

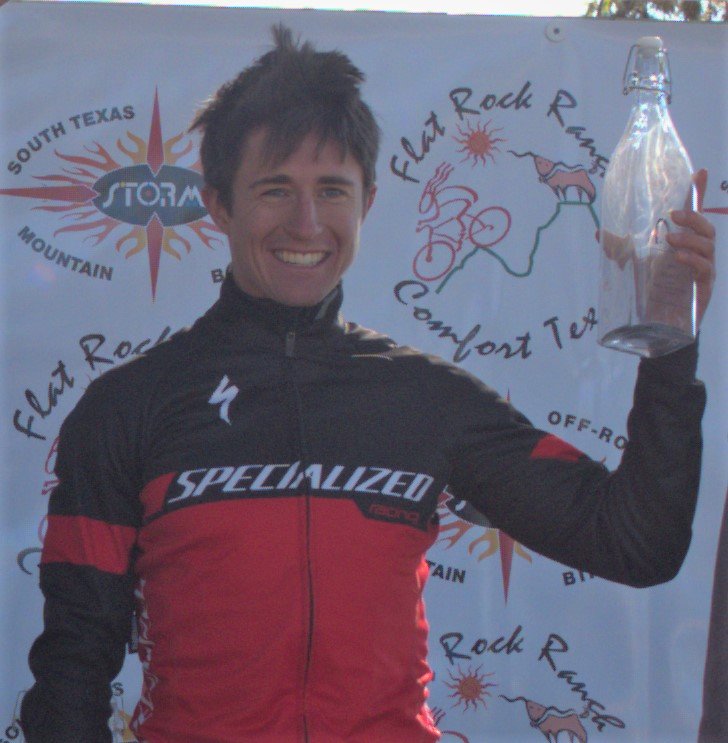
- Grotts on the Men's Marathon MTB XC podium in Texas - January 2017

Personal information
- Born: January 12, 1993 (age 33) Durango, Colorado, United States

Cycling career
- Sport: Cycling
- Discipline: Mountain bike
- Role: MTB racer / Coach for Durango Devo cycling development team
Medal record
Representing United States
Men's mountain bike racing
World Championships
Bronze medal – third place	2014 Lillehammer-Hafjell	Men's U23 cross-country

Howard Grotts (born January 12, 1993) is an American cross-country mountain biker. He rode in the cross-country event at the 2016 Summer Olympics. He also won the Leadville Trail 100 for 3 consecutive years from 2017 to 2019. He has also won the Cape Epic twice, in 2018 and 2024.

== Major results ==
2014
3rd Cross-country, UCI World Under-23 Championships
3rd Marathon, National Championships
5th Overall UCI Under-23 XCO World Cup

3rd Albstadt

2015
1st Cross-country, National Championships
2016
National Championships

1st Cross-country
1st Short track

2017
National Championships

1st Cross-country
2nd Marathon

1st Leadville Trail 100
2nd Bonelli Park XC
3rd Sea Otter Classic Cross-country
2018
National Championships

1st Cross-country
2nd Marathon

1st Overall Cape Epic (with Jaroslav Kulhavý)
1st Leadville Trail 100
1st Missoula XC
2nd Cypress Sunshine Cup
2nd Sea Otter Classic Cross-country
2019
1st Leadville Trail 100
2nd Cross-country, National Championships
2024
1st Overall Cape Epic (with Matthew Beers)
