= David Wiens =

American racing cyclist

Personal information
- Height: 6 ft 2 in (188 cm)
- Weight: 185 lb (84 kg)

Cycling career
- Sport: Cycling
- Current team: Team Topeak-Ergon
- Discipline: Cross Country

Professional teams
- Tune Up Diamond Back
- Team Topeak-Ergon

Major wins
- Leadville 100, 2003-2008

David Wiens is an American former professional cross-country mountain bike racer. He is known for his six consecutive wins in the Leadville Trail 100 MTB mountain bike race including defeating Tour de France riders Floyd Landis and Lance Armstrong.

Wiens, a 2000 inductee to the Mountain Bike Hall of Fame, won the Leadville Trail 100 every year from 2003 to 2008. In 2007, he broke the 7 hour mark for the first time at 6:58:46 while holding off Floyd Landis by just under 2 minutes. In 2008, Wiens won again beating 7-time Tour de France entrant Lance Armstrong by just under 2 minutes and setting a new course record of 6:45:45. In 2009, Wiens finished second behind Armstrong in Leadville with a time of 6:57:02. Wiens was also the US National cross country champion in 1993 and the US National marathon champion in 2004. He won two UCI World Cup races and numerous NORBA National Series races during his career.

In 2006, Wiens founded Gunnison Trails, a non-profit organization dedicated to enhancing singletrack trails on public lands adjacent to Gunnison, Colorado. In 2008, Wiens began representing Ergon Bike Ergonomics, a German brand focused on producing ergonomically designed grips, saddles, packs and more. In 2011, Wiens began working with the Leadville Race Series as a consultant and ambassador. In 2012, Wiens created the Mountain Sports program at Western State Colorado University in Gunnison. Mountain Sports is a sports marketing brand unique to the higher education landscape and offers training and competition in multiple disciplines of skiing, cycling, snowboarding and trail running. Wiens joined the board of directors for the International Mountain Bicycling Association (IMBA) in January 2016 and was appointed to the position of board chairman in November 2016. Wiens is married to Susan DeMattei, a former professional mountain bike racer and Olympic bronze medal winner, and they have lived in Gunnison for decades.
