= Crusher in the Tushar =

American bicycle race

The Crusher in the Tushar was a 69-mile bicycle race, starting in the historic town of Beaver, Utah, and finishing at the Eagle Mountain Ski Resort, featuring equal parts of paved & unpaved sections, and over 10,500 feet of climbing.

It was created by professional cyclist Burke Swindlehurst who trained in the Tushar Mountains in high school.

The inaugural event, in July 2011, was won by the American professional cyclist Tyler Wren (of Team Jamis-Sutter Home) in the pro men's event. The pro women's event was won by multi-time Canadian Olympian Clara Hughes.

The race was canceled permanently in 2026 after the Cottonwood Wire devastated the Tushar Mountains.
