= Life Time, Inc. =

Athletic-Country Club chain in the United States and Canada

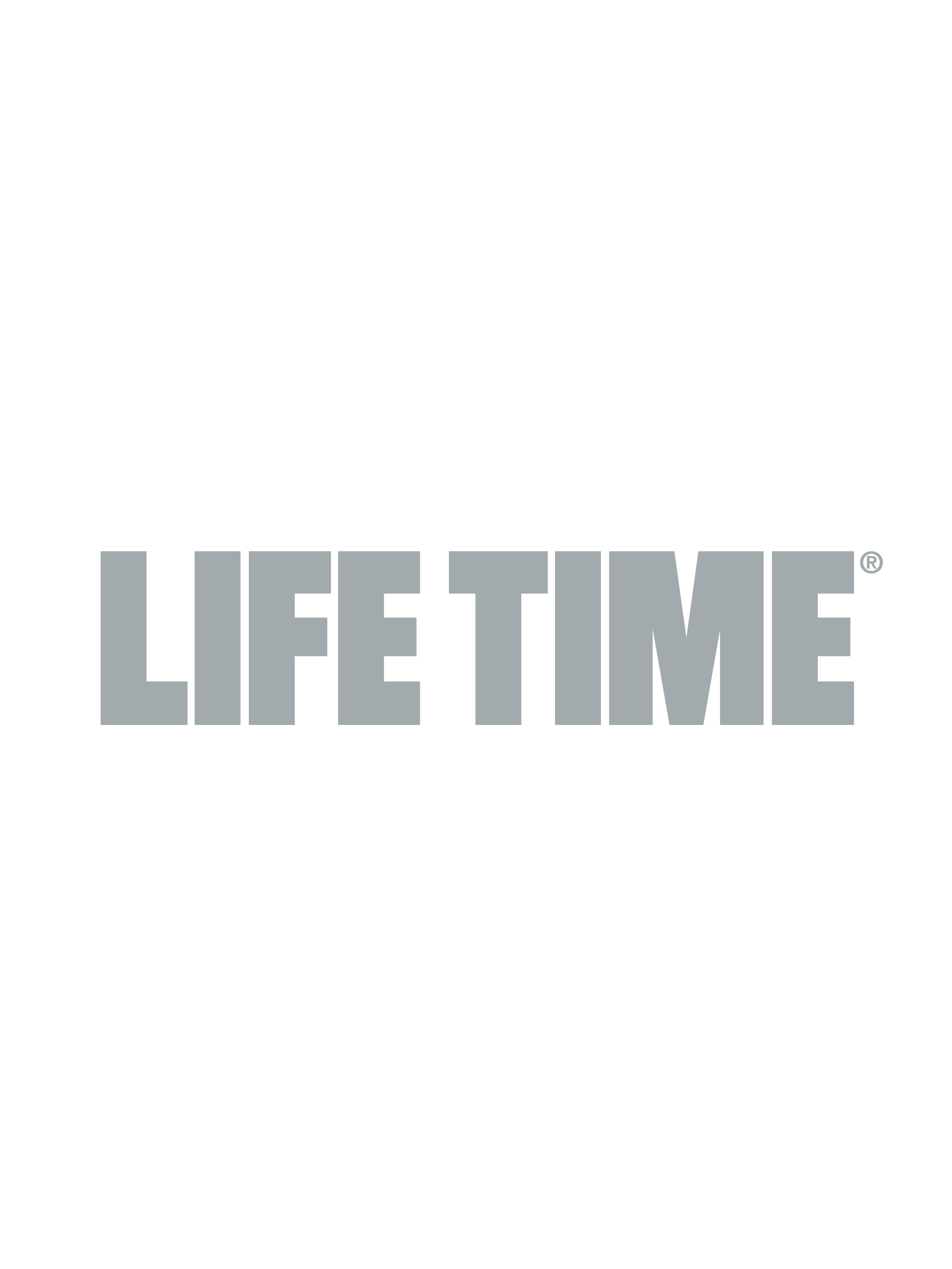
- Formerly: FCA ltd.
- Type: Public
- Traded as: NYSE: LTH
- Founded: 1990; 36 years ago (as FCA, Ltd.); 1992; 34 years ago (as Life Time Fitness, Inc.)
- Founder: Bahram Akradi
- Headquarters: Chanhassen, Minnesota, U.S.
- Area served: United States and Canada
- Key people: Bahram Akradi; Founder/Chairman/CEO
- Revenue: ▲US$3.00 billion (2025)
- Net income: ▲US$374 million (2025)
- Number of employees: 36,000
- Website: lifetime.life

Life Time, Inc. (formerly Life Time Fitness, Inc.) is a chain of athletic country clubs in the United States and Canada.

== History ==
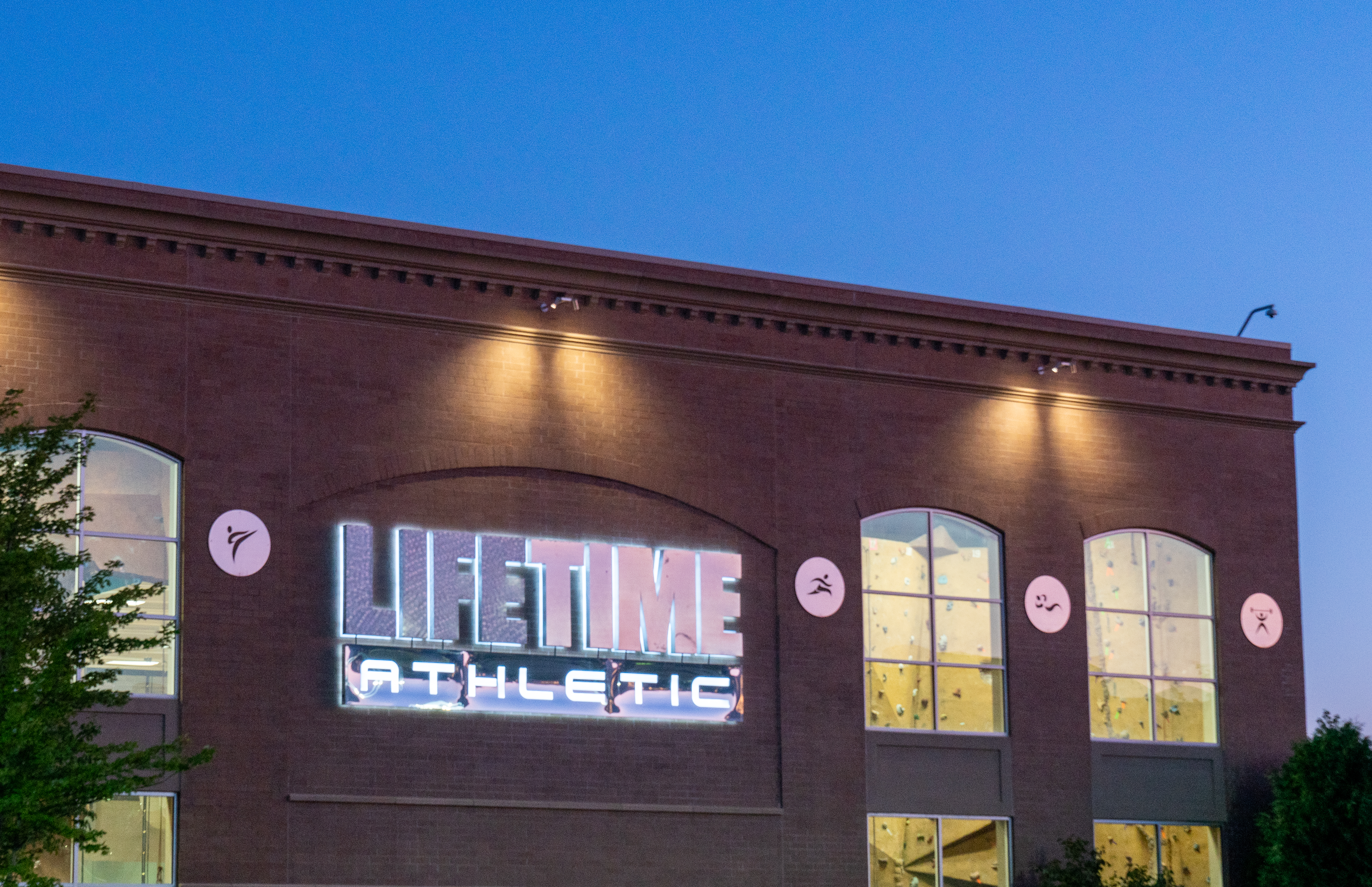
Life Time Athletic, Chanhassen, Minnesota

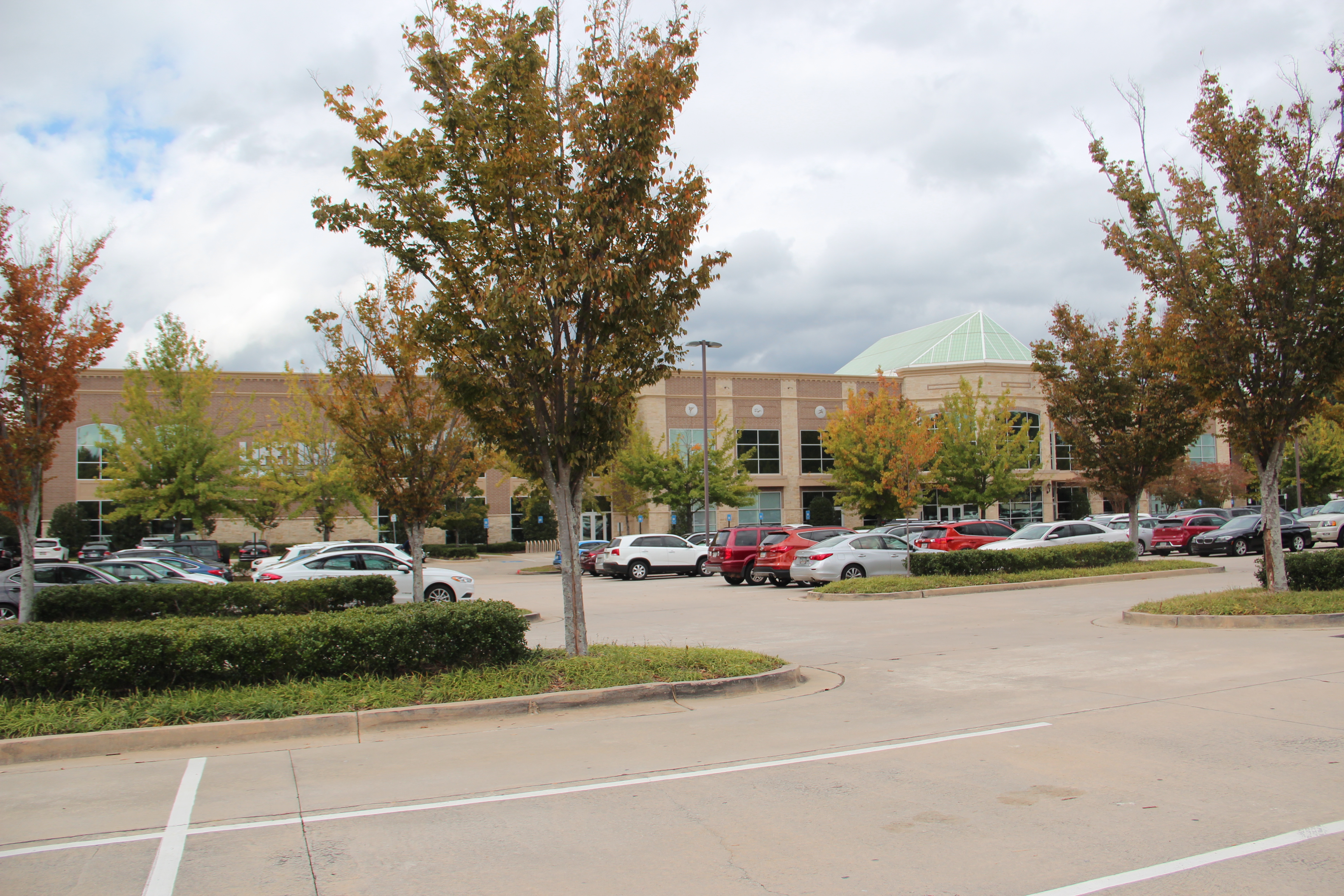
Life Time Inc. facility, Alpharetta, Georgia

The company was founded by chairman and chief executive officer, Bahram Akradi. The company was incorporated in 1990 as FCA, Ltd., a Minnesota corporation, and registered the name Life Time Fitness in March of 1992. In 2017, the word "Fitness" was officially dropped from the brand name, and the company became simply Life Time, Inc. The first club opened in Brooklyn Park, Minnesota.

Several locations were added to the Minneapolis–St. Paul area before the chain expanded to suburban communities in other states. As of mid-2021, the locations include over 160 athletic clubs, 3 apartment home residences, and 10 coworking locations. Most Life Time locations are located in exurban or suburban areas in medium to large-sized metropolitan areas, with some locations in central city or inner suburban areas. The oldest facility is in Eagan, Minnesota. In December 2019 they opened up a new facility inside of the Southdale Mall in Edina, Minnesota, replacing the former tenant J.C. Penney.

In addition to its health clubs, the company has created or acquired, as of 2012, more than 200 annual races in the United States. These include the Life Time Tri Series, the Leadville Race Series, the Chequamegon Fat Tire Festival in Hayward, Wisconsin, the Unbound Gravel gravel bicycle race, and the Miami Marathon.

In August 2014, Life Time, a publicly traded company at the time, considered becoming a Real Estate Investment Trust (REIT) in response to pressure from its largest shareholder, Marcato Capital Management. In March 2015, Life Time was acquired by private equity firms TPG Capital and Leonard Green & Partners in a leveraged buyout.

== Controversies ==
Several employees of Life Time Fitness took the firm to court for withholding wages in 2004. In 2009, a court ruled in favor of employees in the case of Baden-Winterwood v. Life Time Fitness Inc., with a judgment that employees must be paid in accordance with federal and state wage-and-hour laws which require overtime pay for hours worked in excess of 40 in a workweek.

== See also ==
- Northwest Athletic Clubs
- Blink Fitness
- Equinox Group
- Planet Fitness
- Town Sports International Holdings
