= 2022 UCI Mountain Bike season =

Details
- Dates: 15 January – 27 December
- Location: World

The 2022 UCI Mountain Bike season was the seventeenth season of the UCI Mountain Bike season. The 2022 season began on 15 January with the Momentum Medical Scheme Attakwas Extreme presented by Biogen in South Africa and ended in December 2022.

== Events ==
=== January ===
Date	Race Name	Location	Class	Winner	Second	Third	Ref
15 January	Momentum Medical Scheme Attakwas Extreme	(South Africa) Oudtshoorn	1	Simon Andreassen (DEN); Yolande de Villiers (RSA)	Tristan Nortje (RSA); Sarah Hill (RSA)	Matthew Beers (RSA); Mariske Strauss (RSA)	
22–25 January	Club La Santa 4 Stage MTB Lanzarote	(Spain) Lanzarote	S1	Karl Markt (AUT); Ann-Dorthe Lisbygd (DEN)	Víctor Manuel Fernández (ESP); Irina Lützelschwab (SUI)	Ismael Ventura (ESP); Tessa Kortekaas (NED)	
27–30 January	Five Continents Bike Race Costa Blanca	(Spain) Altea	S1	Georg Egger (GER); Hildegunn Hovdenak (NOR)	Krzysztof Łukasik (POL); Solenne Billouin (FRA)	Francesc Carretero (ESP); Meritxell Figueras (ESP)	
29–30 January	Copa Chile Internacional #1	(Chile) Valdivia	1	Martín Vidaurre (CHI); Catalina Vidaurre (CHI)	José Gabriel (BRA); María Moreno Camus (CHI)	Nicolás Delich (CHI); Yarela González (CHI)	
30 January	Clásica Valdemorillo 2022 – #1 Round Copa de España XCM	(Spain) Valdemorillo	S1	Manuel Cordero (ESP); Natalia Fischer (ESP)	Raúl Bermúdez (ESP); María Díaz Pernía (ESP)	Francisco Mancebo (ESP); Estefanía Gutiérrez (ESP)	

=== February ===
Date	Race Name	Location	Class	Winner	Second	Third	Ref
3–6 February	Momentum Medical Scheme Tankwa Trek	(South Africa) Ceres	S1	Filippo Colombo (SUI); Nino Schurter (SUI); Candice Lill (RSA); Mariske Strauss (RSA)	Matthew Beers (RSA); Tristan Nortje (RSA); Sarah Hill (RSA); Theresa Ralph (RSA)	Wessel Botha (SUI); Marco Joubert (RSA); Kimberley Le Court (MRI); Samantha Sanders (RSA)	
3–6 February	La Leyenda de Tartessos	(Spain) Huelva	S2	David Valero (ESP); Natalia Fischer (ESP)	Pablo Rodríguez (ESP); Rocío del Alba García (ESP)	Tiago Ferreira (POR); María Díaz Pernía (ESP)	
5 February	Volcat Platja D'Aro – 1	(Spain) Castell-Platja d'Aro	3	Cole Paton (USA); Savilia Blunk (USA)	Victor Vidal (FRA); Noemí Moreno (ESP)	Xavier Ariza (ESP); Jordina Muntadas (ESP)	
5 February	Mattila Fatbike Marathon	(Sweden) Torsby	3	Albin Rimås (SWE)	Vidar Mehl (NOR)	Odd Erlend Hansen Berg (NOR)	
5–6 February	Copa Chile Internacional #2–San José de la Mariquina	(Chile) Valdivia	2	José Gabriel (BRA); Catalina Vidaurre (CHI)	Martín Vidaurre (CHI); Yarela González (CHI)	Nicolás Delich (CHI); María Moreno Camus (CHI)	
6 February	Volcat Platja D'Aro – 2	(Spain) Castell-Platja d'Aro	3	Cole Paton (USA); Savilia Blunk (USA)	Xavier Ariza (ESP); Naima Diesner (GER)	Julen Latorre (ESP); Noemí Moreno (ESP)	
10–13 February	Mediterranean Epic	(Spain) Oropesa del Mar	SHC	Georg Egger (GER); Natalia Fischer (ESP)	Wout Alleman (BEL); Evie Richards (GBR)	Hans Becking (NED); Janina Wüst (SUI)	
12 February	Trek Israel XCO - Israel State Cup XCO #2	(Israel) Mishmar HaEmek	2	Tomer Zaltsman (ISR); Na'ama Noyman (ISR)	Gil-Li Gonen (ISR); Lianne Witkin (ISR)	Eitan Levi (ISR); Naomi Luria (ISR)	
12 February	Incekum Mountain Bike Cup	(Turkey) Antalya	3	Vital Albin (SUI); Viktoria Kirsanova (RUS)	Fabio Püntener (SUI); Aleksandra Ushakova (RUS)	Luca Schätti (SUI); Alina Sarkulova (KAZ)	
12–13 February	CR Open DH 2022	(Costa Rica) Cartago	2	Neko Mulally (USA); Mariana Salazar (ESA)	Roger Vieira (BRA); Rachel Pageau (CAN)	Camilo Sánchez Salazar (COL); Valentina Roa (COL)	
13 February	Karaburun MTB Cup	(Turkey) Antalya	2	Reto Indergand (SUI); Aleksandra Ushakova (RUS)	Fabio Püntener (SUI); Anastasiya Poklonskaya (RUS)	Dmytro Titarenko (UKR); Iryna Popova (UKR)	
18–20 February	Tropical Mountain Bike Challenge	(Puerto Rico) Salinas	1	Diego Arias (COL); Kate Courtney (USA); Quinton Disera (CAN) (XCC); Kate Courtney (USA) (XCC)	Carter Woods (CAN); Gwendalyn Gibson (USA); Raphaël Auclair (CAN) (XCC); Gwendalyn Gibson (USA) (XCC)	Tyler Orschel (CAN); Cindy Montambault (CAN); Carter Woods (CAN) (XCC); Hannah Otto (USA) (XCC)	
19–20 February	Taça Brasil de MTB XCO – Curitiba	(Brazil) Curitiba	2	Luiz Cocuzzi (BRA); Karen Olímpio (BRA)	Gustavo Xavier (BRA); Raiza Goulão (BRA)	Raphael Machado (BRA); Hercília Najara (BRA)	
20 February	Internacionales XCO Chelva	(Spain) Chelva	1	Alan Hatherly (RSA); Jolanda Neff (SUI)	Filippo Colombo (SUI); Linda Indergand (SUI)	David Valero (ESP); Martina Berta (ITA)	
21–26 February	UCI MTB Marathon Series – Andalucía Bike Race	(Spain) Jaén and Córdoba	SSR	Andreas Seewald (GER); Martin Stošek (CZE); Ariane Lüthi (SUI); Amy McDougall (RSA)	Fabian Rabensteiner (ITA); Wout Alleman (BEL); Janine Schneider (GER); Irina Lützelschwab (SUI)	José Dias (POR); Hans Becking (NED); Stefanie Dohrn (GER); Lejla Tanović (BIH)	
26 February	SA XCO Cup Series #1	(South Africa) Parys	2	Arno du Toit (RSA); Candice Lill (RSA)	Philip Buys (RSA); Mariske Strauss (RSA)	Matthew Beers (RSA); Danielle Strydom (RSA)	
26 February	Justiniano Hotel MTB Cup	(Turkey) Alanya/Antalya	3	Joshua Dubau (FRA); Tereza Tvarůžková (CZE)	Julian Schelb (GER); Kristina Ilina ()	Eli Iserbyt (BEL); Aleksandra Ushakova ()	
26–27 February	Verona MTB International	(Italy) Verona	2	Simone Avondetto (ITA); Laura Stigger (AUT)	Max Foidl (AUT); Giada Specia (ITA)	Filippo Fontana (ITA); Giorgia Marchet (ITA)	
26–27 February	Copa Catalana Internacional BTT #1	(Spain) Banyoles	HC	Titouan Carod (FRA); Evie Richards (GBR)	Filippo Colombo (SUI); Alessandra Keller (SUI)	Thomas Litscher (SUI); Annie Last (GBR)	
27 February	Valparaíso Cerro Abajo	(Chile) Valparaíso	2	Pedro Ferreira (CHI)	Tomáš Slavík (CZE)	Johannes Fischbach (GER)	
27 February	Puerto Rico Mountain Bike Cup	(Puerto Rico) Rincón	1	Jhonnatan Botero Villegas (COL); Kate Courtney (USA)	Quinton Disera (CAN); Gwendalyn Gibson (USA)	Georwill Pérez Román (PUR); Hannah Otto (USA)	
27 February	Alanya MTB Cup	(Turkey) Alanya	1	Joshua Dubau (FRA); Tereza Tvarůžková (CZE)	Stéphane Tempier (FRA); Viktoria Kirsanova ()	Eli Iserbyt (BEL); Jana Czeczinkarová (CZE)	

=== March ===
Date	Race Name	Location	Class	Winner	Second	Third	Ref
5–6 March	Taça Brasil de MTB Cross Country 2022 – XCO #1	(Brazil) Lavras	1	Henrique Avancini (BRA); Isabella Lacerda (BRA)	José Gabriel (BRA); Karen Olímpio (BRA)	Ulan Bastos Galinski (BRA); Raiza Goulão (BRA)	
5–6 March	1# Internazionali d'Italia Series	(Italy) San Zeno di Montagna	1	Lars Forster (SUI); Giada Specia (ITA)	Luca Braidot (ITA); Martina Berta (ITA)	Maxime Marotte (FRA); Giorgia Marchet (ITA)	
5–6 March	Portugal Cup XCO #1 – Melgaço International XCO	(Portugal) Melgaço	1	Max Foidl (AUT); Ana Santos (POR)	Iván Feijoo Alberte (ESP); Joana Monteiro (POR)	Ismael Esteban Agüero (ESP); Lucía Gómez Andreu (ESP)	
5–6 March	Downhill de Tarouca – Portugal Cup DHI #1	(Portugal) Tarouca	1	Amaury Pierron (FRA); Myriam Nicole (FRA)	Gonçalo Bandeira (POR); Valentina Höll (AUT)	Benoît Coulanges (FRA); Tahnée Seagrave (GBR)	
5–6 March	Supercup Massi La Nucía	(Spain) La Nucia	1	Thomas Litscher (SUI); Rocío del Alba García (ESP)	Gerardo Ulloa (MEX); Natalia Fischer (ESP)	Ondřej Cink (CZE); Matylda Szczecińska (POL)	
6 March	VTT Chabrières 2022	(France) Guéret	1	Thomas Griot (FRA); Léna Gérault (FRA)	Jens Schuermans (BEL); Olivia Onesti (FRA)	Joshua Dubau (FRA); Juliette Trombini (FRA)	
10–13 March	Aragon Bike Race	(Spain) Calatayud	S2	Jaroslav Kulhavý (CZE); Lejla Tanović (BIH)	Sergio Mantecón (ESP); Eva Elbaile Périz (ESP)	Marek Rauchfuss (CZE); Ana María Ivanov (ESP)	
11–12 March	XCO Città di Albenga Campochiesa	(Italy) Albenga	1	Jordan Sarrou (FRA); Sina Frei (SUI)	Gerhard Kerschbaumer (ITA); Alessandra Keller (SUI)	Adrien Boichis (FRA); Eva Lechner (ITA)	
11–13 March	Tennessee National	(United States) Oliver Springs	2	Dakotah Norton (USA); Kailey Skelton (USA)	Austin Dooley (USA); Frida Rønning (USA)	Nikolas Nestoroff (USA); Gracey Hemstreet (CAN)	
12 March	Theodora MTB Cup	(Turkey) Antalya	3	Axel Lindh (SWE); Linn Gustafzzon (SWE)	Matej Ulík (SVK); Kristina Ilina ()	Riki Kitabayashi (JPN); Tereza Tvarůžková (CZE)	
12–13 March	Proffix Swiss Bike Cup Rickenbach	(Switzerland) Rickenbach	2	Andri Frischknecht (SUI); Linda Indergand (SUI)	Reto Indergand (SUI); Jacqueline Schneebeli (SUI)	Loan Cheneval (FRA); Paula Gorycka (POL)	
13 March	Velo Alanya MTB Cup	(Turkey) Alanya	1	Niklas Schehl (GER); Linn Gustafzzon (SWE)	Dmytro Titarenko (UKR); Tereza Tvarůžková (CZE)	Romain Seigle (FRA); Kristina Ilina ()	
13 March	Gran Premio Ciudad de Valladolid BTT XCO – #1 Round 2022 Copa España BTT XCO	(Spain) Valladolid	2	Axel Roudil Cortinat (FRA); Estíbaliz Sagardoy (ESP)	Pablo Rodríguez (ESP); Joana Monteiro (POR)	Ismael Esteban (ESP); Lara Lois (ESP)	
18–20 March	Coupe de France MTB #1 – XCO/XCE	(France) Marseille	HC	Titouan Carod (FRA); Loana Lecomte (FRA); Titouan Perrin-Ganier (FRA) (XCE); Noémie Garnier (FRA) (XCE)	Jordan Sarrou (FRA); Martina Berta (ITA); Lorenzo Serres (FRA) (XCE); Léa Houyvet (FRA) (XCE)	Vlad Dascălu (ROU); Greta Seiwald (ITA); Simon Gegenheimer (GER) (XCE); Amélie Vazeille (FRA) (XCE)	
19 March	2022 AusCycling MTB XCO National Cup #1 – CORC Stromlo MTB Classic	(Australia) Canberra	2	Daniel McConnell (AUS); Rebecca McConnell (AUS)	Sam Fox (AUS); Zoe Cuthbert (AUS)	Brendan Johnston (AUS); Katherine Hosking (AUS)	
19 March	International Shfaram XCO - Israel State Cup XCO #3	(Israel) Shefa-Amr	2	Tomer Zaltsman (ISR); Na'ama Noyman (ISR)	Shlomi Haimy (ISR); Lianne Witkin (ISR)	Eitan Levi (ISR); Romi Vladnitski (ISR)	
19–20 March	Taça Brasil de MTB Cross Country 2022 #2 – XCO	(Brazil) São Paulo	2	Luiz Cocuzzi (BRA); Giuliana Salvini (BRA)	José Gabriel (BRA); Raiza Goulão (BRA)	Mário Couto (BRA); Hercília Najara (BRA)	
19–20 March	Fullgaz-CC-Race	(Germany) Obergessertshausen	1	Maximilian Brandl (GER); Linda Indergand (SUI); Maximilian Brandl (GER) (XCC); Jolanda Neff (SUI) (XCC)	Luca Schwarzbauer (GER); Caroline Bohé (DEN); Leon Kaiser (GER) (XCC); Linda Indergand (SUI)	David List (GER); Jolanda Neff (SUI); Julian Schelb (GER) (XCC); Annie Last (GBR) (XCC)	
19–20 March	Gaerne MTB Trophy	(Italy) Maser	2	Filippo Fontana (ITA); Giada Specia (ITA)	Andreas Emanuele Vittone (ITA); Giorgia Marchet (ITA)	Diego Arias (COL); Eva Lechner (ITA)	
19–20 March	Downhill da Padela – Portugal Cup DHI #2	(Portugal) Carvoeiro	2	Dan Slack (GBR); Anna Craig (GBR)	Ethan Craik (GBR); Jolanda Kiener (SUI)	Rafael Bascón (ESP); Estefanía Cabarcos (ESP)	
20 March	Superprestigio MTB #1	(Spain) Elda	1	David Valero (ESP); Rocío del Alba García (ESP)	Ismael Esteban (ESP); Ana Santos (POR)	Pablo Rodríguez (ESP); Estíbaliz Sagardoy (ESP)	
20–27 March	UCI MTB Marathon Series #1 – 2022 Absa Cape Epic	(South Africa) Cape Town	SSR	Georg Egger (GER); Lukas Baum (GER); Haley Batten (USA); Sofía Gómez Villafañe (ARG)	Andreas Seewald (GER); Martin Stošek (CZE); Candice Lill (RSA); Mariske Strauss (RSA)	Matthew Beers (RSA); Christopher Blevins (USA); Pauline Ferrand-Prévot (FRA); Robyn de Groot (RSA)	
25–27 March	ÖKK Bike Revolution Tamaro Trophy	(Switzerland) Riviera	HC	Filippo Colombo (SUI); Loana Lecomte (FRA)	Titouan Carod (FRA); Anne Terpstra (NED)	Mathias Flückiger (SUI); Linda Indergand (SUI)	
26 March	Alanya Banana MTB Cup	(Turkey) Alanya	3	David Risberg (SWE); Linn Gustafzzon (SWE)	Denis Sergiyenko (KAZ); Iryna Popova (UKR)	Vilgot Lindh (SWE); Anna Miroliubova ()	
26–27 March	Internacional Estrada Real #2	(Brazil) Itabirito	1	Henrique Avancini (BRA); Isabella Lacerda (BRA)	Luiz Cocuzzi (BRA); Raiza Goulão (BRA)	Gustavo Xavier (BRA); Hercília Najara (BRA)	
26–27 March	XXX KTM Kamptal Trophy	(Austria) Langenlois	1	Ondřej Cink (CZE); Mona Mitterwallner (AUT)	Mario Bair (AUT); Leonie Daubermann (GER)	Gerhard Kerschbaumer (ITA); Jitka Čábelická (CZE)	
27 March	Copa Internacional Mezuena #1	(Colombia) Zipaquirá	3	Juan Carlos Sánchez (COL); María José Salamanca (COL)	Steven Quintero (COL); Natalia Duarte (COL)	Iván Felipe López (COL); Ana Maria Briceño (COL)	
27 March	XCO Vrtojba 2022	(Slovenia) Vrtojba	1	Nadir Colledani (ITA); Tanja Žakelj (SVN)	Gregor Raggl (AUT); Yana Belomoyna (UKR)	Oleksandr Hudyma (UKR); Karla Štěpánová (CZE)	
27 March	G.P. X-Sauce – #2 Round 2022 Copa España BTT XCO	(Spain) Alpedrete	2	Axel Roudil Cortinat (FRA); Ana Santos (POR)	David Campos Motos (ESP); Núria Bosch Picó (ESP)	Cristofer Bosque Ruano (ESP); Estíbaliz Sagardoy (ESP)	
27 March	Scott Marathon BTT – #2 Round 2022 Copa España BTT XCM	(Spain) Cambrils	2	Guillem Cassú (ESP); Estefanía Gutiérrez (ESP)	Peeter Pruus (EST); Estelle Boudot-Morel (FRA)	Óliver Áviles (ESP); María Díaz Pernía (ESP)	
27 March	Alanya Avocado MTB Cup	(Turkey) Alanya	2	Vilgot Lindh (SWE); Linn Gustafzzon (SWE)	Dmytro Titarenko (UKR); Aleksandra Ushakova ()	Nikolai Ivanov (); Viktoria Kirsanova ()	

=== April ===
Date	Race Name	Location	Class	Winner	Second	Third	Ref
1 April	Rosh Haayin XCO	(Israel) Rosh HaAyin	2	Tomer Zaltsman (ISR); Na'ama Noyman (ISR)	Gil-li Gonen (ISR); Lianne Witkin (ISR)	Shlomi Haimy (ISR); Romi Vladnitski (ISR)	
1–3 April	Marlene Südtirol Sunshine Race – #2 Internazionali d'Italia Series	(Italy) Nals	HC	Nadir Colledani (ITA); Mona Mitterwallner (AUT)	Gioele Bertolini (ITA); Leonie Daubermann (GER)	Simone Avondetto (ITA); Eva Lechner (ITA)	
2 April	XCO Premantura Rocky Trails	(Croatia) Premantura	1	Silas Graf (GER); Lejla Tanović (BIH)	Esteban Bagnon (FRA); Tanja Žakelj (SVN)	Clément Auvin (FRA); Vita Movrin (SVN)	
2 April	MTB XCO Czech Cup #1	(Czech Republic) Brno	1	Krzysztof Łukasik (POL); Lia Schrievers (GER)	Jan Zatloukal (CZE); Tereza Tvarůžková (CZE)	Filip Konečný (CZE); Adéla Holubová (CZE)	
2 April	SA XCO Cup Series #2	(South Africa) Cape Town	1	Arno du Toit (RSA); Candice Lill (RSA)	Philip Buys (RSA); Mariske Strauss (RSA)	Matthew Beers (RSA); Danielle Strydom (RSA)	
2 April	Copa Catalana Internacional BTT #2	(Spain) Barcelona	1	Jofre Cullell (ESP); Lucía Gómez Andreu (ESP)	Iván Feijoo (ESP); Olivia Onesti (FRA)	Francesc Barber (ESP); Ana Santos (POR)	
2 April	Power Race Leon – #1 Round Copa de España XCUM	(Spain) León	1	Francisco Herrero (ESP); Anna Ramírez Bauxel (ESP)	Adrián García Montes (ESP); Estefanía Gutiérrez (ESP)	Raúl Castrillo (ESP); Teresa Barreira (ESP)	
2–3 April	CIMTB Michelin – XCC/XCO	(Brazil) Petrópolis	1	Martín Vidaurre (CHI); Jolanda Neff (SUI); Thomas Litscher (SUI) (XCC); Kate Courtney (USA) (XCC)	Vlad Dascălu (ROU); Laura Stigger (AUT); Julian Schelb (GER) (XCC); Gwendalyn Gibson (USA) (XCC)	Thomas Litscher (SUI); Evie Richards (GBR); Gunnar Holmgren (CAN) (XCC); Ruth Holcomb (USA) (XCC)	
2–3 April	Roc Laissagais – XCM	(France) Laissac	HC	Aleksey Medvedev (); Estelle Morel (FRA)	Héctor Leonardo Páez (COL); Costanza Fasolis (ITA)	Martin Frey (GER); Sophie Johnson (GBR)	
2–3 April	#2 Taça de Portugal XCO C2	(Portugal) Abrantes	2	Mário Costa (POR); Joana Monteiro (POR)	Roberto Ferreira (POR); Lara Lois (ESP)	Ricardo Marinheiro (POR); Ana Tomás (POR)	
2–3 April	Manavgat Dağ Bisikleti Maratonu	(Turkey) Manavgat	2	Evgenii Evgrafov (); Azize Bekar (TUR)	Emre Yavuz (TUR); Viktoriia Melnikova ()	Erik Mattelin (SWE); Sevim Gerçek (TUR)	
3 April	Abierto Argentino de XCO #1	(Argentina) Mendoza	2	Joel Contreras (ARG); Inés Gutiérrez (ARG)	Álvaro Macías (ARG); Agustina Antonella Quirós (ARG)	Juan Ignacio Goudailliez (ARG); Evelyn Muñoz (CHI)	
3 April	IXS Downhill Cup Lošinj	(Croatia) Lošinj	1	Luka Berginc (SVN); Jolanda Kiener (SUI)	Simon Maurer (GER); Justine Welzel (GER)	Jure Žabjek (SVN); Vilma Gombalová (SVK)	
3 April	XCM Kamenjak Rocky Trails	(Croatia) Premantura	2	Jaroslav Kulhavý (CZE); Tanja Žakelj (SVN)	Tomáš Višňovský (SVK); Karmen Škiljić (CRO)	Nicolas Samparisi (ITA); Tanja Priller (GER)	
3 April	Argovia Vittoria-Fischer Cup: Lostorf C2	(Switzerland) Lostorf	2	Simon Vitzthum (SUI); Rebekka Estermann (SUI)	Nick Bürki (SUI); Janina Wüst (SUI)	Finn Treudler (SUI); Finja Lipp (GER)	
8–9 April	Namibia XC 1	(Namibia) Windhoek	1	Alex Miller (NAM); Mariske Strauss (RSA)	Johann van Zyl (RSA); Monique Du Plessis (NAM)	Cameron Wright (AUS); Nicola Fester (NAM)	
9–10 April	British Cycling National Cross Country Series Round #1	(United Kingdom) Merthyr Tydfil	2	Charlie Aldridge (GBR); Elena McGorum (GBR)	Cameron Mason (GBR); Anna Flynn (GBR)	Corran Carrick-Anderson (GBR); Joanne Thom (GBR)	
9–10 April	Copa Catalana Internacional BTT #3	(Spain) Corró d'Amunt	2	Ever Alejandro Gómez (BOL); Núria Bosch Picó (ESP)	Hugo Drechou (FRA); Giulia Challancin (ITA)	Cristofer Bosque Ruano (ESP); Lianne Witkin (ISR)	
10 April	MTB Croatia Cup – Vodice	(Croatia) Vodice	1	Max Foidl (AUT); Paula Gorycka (POL)	Jakob Dorigoni (ITA); Tanja Žakelj (SVN)	Lukas Malezsewski (BEL); Lejla Tanović (BIH)	
10 April	Superprestigio MTB #2	(Spain) Caparroso	1	Mário Costa (POR); Estíbaliz Sagardoy (ESP)	Ricardo Marinheiro (POR); Lucía Gómez (ESP)	Ismael Esteban (ESP); Joana Monteiro (POR)	
14–17 April	VolCAT BTT	(Spain) Igualada	S1	Hans Becking (NED); Ann-Dorthe Lisbygd (DEN)	Marc Stutzmann (SUI); Bettina Janas (GER)	Riccardo Chiarini (ITA); Hildegunn Hovdenak (NOR)	
15–17 April	Coupe de France MTB #2 XCO/XCC	(France) Guéret	1	Joshua Dubau (FRA); Hélène Clauzel (FRA); Julien Trarieux (FRA) (XCC); Sofie Pedersen (DEN) (XCC)	Jens Schuermans (BEL); Margot Moschetti (FRA); Antoine Philipp (FRA) (XCC); Hélène Clauzel (FRA) (XCC)	Antoine Philipp (FRA); Constance Valentin (FRA); Axel Roudil-Cortinat (FRA) (XCC); Margot Moschetti (FRA) (XCC)	
16–17 April	UK National Cross-country Series #2	(United Kingdom) Newcastleton	2	Cameron Orr (GBR); Annie Last (GBR)	Charlie Aldridge (GBR); Anna Flynn (GBR)	Corran Carrick-Anderson (GBR); Elena McGorum (GBR)	
16–18 April	Capoliveri Legend XCO – #3 Internazionali d'Italia Series	(Italy) Capoliveri	HC	Luca Braidot (ITA); Jenny Rissveds (SWE)	Nadir Colledani (ITA); Giada Specia (ITA)	Simone Avondetto (ITA); Chiara Teocchi (ITA)	
17 April	3 Nations Cup: Zwiep Scott Cup	(Netherlands) Oldenzaal	3	Chris Van Dijk (NED); Larissa Hartog (NED)	Tom Schellekens (NED); Romana Carfora (NED)	Frits Biesterbos (NED); Rosa van Doorn (NED)	
17 April	Copa Aguavista – XCO	(Paraguay) San Juan del Paraná	1	José Gabriel (BRA); Raiza Goulão (BRA)	Agustín Durán (ARG); Agustina Quirós (ARG)	Dario Gasco (ARG); Samira Méndez (PAR)	
19–23 April	Brasil Ride Espinhaço 2022 – XCMS	(Brazil) Conceição do Mato Dentro	S1	Jaroslav Kulhavý (CZE); Marek Rauchfuss (CZE); Isabella Lacerda (BRA); Hercília Najara (BRA)	Tiago Ferreira (POR); Miguel Muñoz (ESP); Eliane Rezende (BRA); Liege Walter (BRA)	Matouš Ulman (CZE); Tomaš Višňovský (CZE); Paula Gallan (BRA); Luma Diniz (BRA)	
19–23 April	UCI MTB Marathon Series – 4Islands MTB Stage Race Croatia	(Croatia) Baška/Lopar/Merag/Lošinj	SSR	Martin Frey (GER); Simon Stiebjahn (GER); Lejla Tanović (BIH); Stefanie Dohrn (GER)	Hugo Drechou (FRA); Peeter Pruus (EST); Costanza Fasolis (ITA); Claudia Peretti (ITA)	Daniel Geismayr (AUT); Fabian Rabensteiner (ITA); Greete Steinburg (EST); Janina Wüst (SUI)	
20 April	OZ Trails Moosejaw U.S. Pro Cup	(United States) Fayetteville	1	Christopher Blevins (USA); Maghalie Rochette (CAN)	Quinton Disera (CAN); Jennifer Jackson (CAN)	Riley Amos (USA); Haley Batten (USA)	
22–24 April	ÖKK Bike Revolution Chur	(Switzerland) Chur	1	Jordan Sarrou (FRA); Alessandra Keller (SUI)	Titouan Carod (FRA); Anne Terpstra (NED)	Thomas Litscher (SUI); Sina Frei (SUI)	
23 April	Czech MTB Cup	(Czech Republic) Chur	1	Bartłomiej Wawak (POL); Anne Terpstra (NED)	Ondřej Cink (CZE); Lia Schrievers (GER)	Gregor Raggl (AUT); Jitka Čábelická (CZE)	
23 April	Wyścig o Perłę Polskich Uzdrowisk	(Poland) Krynica-Zdrój	3	Krzysztof Łukasik (POL); Gabriela Wojtyła (POL)	Paweł Bernas (POL); Antonina Białek (POL)	Karol Ostaszewski (POL); Klaudią Czabok (POL)	
23 April	OZ Trails U.S. Pro Cup	(United States) Fayetteville	1	Christopher Blevins (USA); Sofía Gómez Villafañe (ARG)	Riley Amos (USA); Jennifer Jackson (CAN)	Gunnar Holmgren (CAN); Savilia Blunk (USA)	
23–24 April	International MTB Bundesliga – Heubacher MTB Festival Bike the Rock	(Germany) Heubach	HC	Luca Schwarzbauer (GER); Malene Degn (DEN)	David List (GER); Puck Pieterse (NED)	Romain Seigle (FRA); Nina Benz (GER)	
23–24 April	Copa Catalana Internacional BTT #4	(Spain) Santa Susanna	1	Jofre Cullell (ESP); Rebecca McConnell (AUS)	Julien Trarieux (FRA); Olivia Onesti (FRA)	Lucas Grieco (FRA); Rocío del Alba García (ESP)	
24 April	Shimano MTB Liga #1	(Denmark) Odense	2	Ian Millennium (DEN); Caroline Bohé (DEN)	Oliver Sølvhøj (DEN); Ann-Dorthe Lisbygd (DEN)	Tobias Lillelund (DEN); Klara Sofie Hansen (DEN)	
24 April	Vigrestad Terrengsykkelfestival – Norway MTB Cup #1 & #2	(Norway) Vigrestad	2	Knut Røhme (NOR); Thea Siggerud (NOR)	Emil Eid (NOR); Sigrid Andrea Fløgstad (NOR)	Mats Tubaas Glende (NOR); Synne Steinsland (NOR)	
24 April	SP XCO Turieckap (UCI C1)	(Slovakia) Turčianske Teplice	1	Bartłomiej Wawak (POL); Matylda Szczecińska (POL)	Filip Helta (POL); Iryna Popova (UKR)	Matej Ulík (SVK); Gabriela Wojtyła (POL)	
24 April	Marathon Templario MTB Race – #3 Round 2022 Copa España BTT XCM	(Spain) Jerez de los Caballeros	2	Manuel Cordero (ESP); Cristina Morán Roza (ESP)	José Márquez Granados (ESP); Almudena Rodríguez (ESP)	Nacho Pérez (ESP); Aida Beteta Corvillo (ESP)	
25 April	MTB Ca'neva Trophy	(Italy) Caneva	2	Luca Braidot (ITA); Giorgia Marchet (ITA)	Filippo Fontana (ITA); Eva Lechner (ITA)	Mirko Tabacchi (ITA); Tanja Žakelj (SVN)	
29 – 30 April	Rye bike festival / Rye terrengsykkelfestival XCO-XCC – Norway MTB Cup #3 & #4	(Norway) Oslo	3	Ole Sigurd Rekdahl (NOR); Sigrid Andrea Fløgstad (NOR); Ole Sigurd Rekdahl (NOR) (XCC); Line Mygdam (DEN) (XCC)	William Handley (NOR); Line Mygdam (DEN); Mats Tubaas Glende (NOR); Ingrid Bøe Jacobsen (NOR)	Mats Tubaas Glende (NOR); Hedda Brenningen Bjørklund (NOR); Emil Eid (NOR) (XCC); Sigrid Andrea Fløgstad (NOR) (XCC)	
30 April	Roc d'Ardenne	(Belgium) Houffalize	1	Wout Allemann (BEL); Estelle Morel (FRA)	Tim Smeenge (NED); Irina Lützelschwab (SUI)	Frans Claes (BEL); Stefanie Dohrn (GER)	
30 April	Santoporo XC	(Italy) Esanatoglia	2	Gioele Bertolini (ITA); Eva Lechner (ITA)	Alessio Agostinelli (ITA); Giorgia Marchet (ITA)	Isaac del Toro (MEX); Letizia Marzani (ITA)	
30 April	Bike Marathon	(Italy) Riva del Garda	1	Andreas Seewald (GER); Adelheid Morath (GER)	Samuele Porro (ITA); Claudia Peretti (ITA)	Urs Huber (SUI); Debora Piana (ITA)	
30 April	SA XCO Cup Series #3	(South Africa) Polokwane	1	Philip Buys (RSA); Mariske Strauss (RSA)	Johann van Zyl (RSA); Candice Lill (RSA)	Arno du Toit (RSA); Karla Stumpf (RSA)	
30 April	MTB SWE Cup XCO #1 Klippingracet 2022	(Sweden) Säter	2	Matthias Wengelin (SWE); Linn Gustafzzon (SWE)	Emil Lindgren (SWE); Hanna Millved (SWE)	Oskar Lind (SWE); Emma Belforth (SWE)	
30 April – May 1	Ötztaler Mountainbike Festival	(Austria) Haiming	HC	Thomas Litscher (SUI); Mona Mitterwallner (AUT)	Gregor Raggl (AUT); Linda Indergand (SUI)	Karl Markt (AUT); Laura Stigger (AUT)	
30 April – May 1	Internacional Estrada Real #2	(Brazil) Ouro Branco	1	Nicolas Machado (BRA); Raiza Goulão (BRA)	Guilherme Müller (BRA); Isabella Lacerda (BRA)	Ulan Galinski (BRA); Letícia Cândido (BRA)	
30 April – May 1	Evento UCI De MTB, Guatemala 2022	Guatemala City	2	Julio Ispache (GUA); Maria Alvarado (GUA); Luis López (HON) (XCC); Daniela Campuzano (MEX) (XCC)	Jaime Miranda (MEX); Sara Bala (GUA); Jaime Miranda (MEX) (XCC); Elizabeth Domínguez (MEX) (XCC)	Luis López (HON); Dulce Escobar (GUA); Julio Ispache (GUA) (XCC); Ana Ruth Clark (MEX) (XCC)	
30 April – May 1	Portugal Cup XCO #3 – Lousada International XCO	(Portugal) Lousada	2	Alberto Barroso (ESP); Ana Santos (POR)	Mário Costa (POR); Lara Lois (ESP)	Roberto Ferreira (POR); Joana Monteiro (POR)	
30 April – May 1	Proffix Swiss Bike Cup Savognin	(Switzerland) Surses	1	Vital Albin (SUI); Ramona Forchini (SUI)	Andri Frischknecht (SUI); Seraina Leugger (SUI)	Joel Roth (SUI); Ginia Caluori (SUI)	

=== May ===
Date	Race Name	Location	Class	Winner	Second	Third	Ref
1 May	Rye bike festival / Rye terrengsykkelfestival XCO-XCC – Norway MTB Cup #5	(Norway) Oslo	3	Emil Eid (NOR); Linn Gustafzzon (SWE)	Mats Tubaas Glende (NOR); Ingrid Bøe Jacobsen (NOR)	Ole Sigurd Rekdahl (NOR); Oda Laforce (NOR)	
1 May	3 Nations Cup: OpFietse MTB Race	(Netherlands) Wijster	1	Sam Gaze (NZL); Fem van Empel (NED)	Jarne Vandersteen (BEL); Puck Pieterse (NED)	Jens Schuermans (BEL); Sophie von Berswordt (NED)	
1 May	Gran Premio Sabiñanigo – #3 Round 2022 Copa España BTT XCO	(Spain) Sabiñánigo	1	Axel Roudil-Cortinat (FRA); Janika Lõiv (EST)	Ismael Esteban Agüero (ESP); Núria Bosch Picó (ESP)	Xavier Ariza (ESP); Blanca Vallés Mejías (ESP)	
6–8 May	IXS European Downhill Cup	(Slovenia) Maribor	2	Luka Berginc (SVN); Monika Hrastnik (SVN)	Johannes Fischbach (GER); Anna Newkirk (USA)	Oliver Zwar (SWE); Lisa Gava (ITA)	
7 May	SoHo Bicycle Festival XCC	(United States) Midway	2	Daxton Mock (USA); Sofia Forney (USA)	Cody Cupp (USA); Tai-Lee Smith (USA)	Brannan Fix (USA); Erin Osborne (USA)	
7–8 May	Copa Chile Angostura	(Chile) Santiago	2	José Gabriel (BRA); María Castro González (CHI)	Sebastián Miranda (CHI); Catalina Vidaurre (CHI)	Patricio Díaz Farías (CHI); Evelyn Muñoz (CHI)	
7–8 May	Copa XCO Costa Rica	(Costa Rica) Cartago	1	Luis Mejía (COL); Daniela Campuzano (MEX); Luis Mejía (COL) (XCC); Daniela Campuzano (MEX) (XCC)	Carlos Herrera (CRC); Adriana Rojas (CRC); Carlos Herrera (CRC) (XCC); Elizabeth Domínguez (MEX) (XCC)	Joseph Ramírez (CRC); Elizabeth Domínguez (MEX); Joseph Ramírez (CRC) (XCC); Adriana Rojas (CRC) (XCC)	
7–8 May	UK National Cross Country Series Round #3	(United Kingdom) Drumlanrig Castle	2	Rory McGuire (GBR); Isla Short (GBR)	Rab Wardell (GBR); Elena McGorum (GBR)	Jason Bouttell (GBR); Jane Barr (GBR)	
7–8 May	National Downhill Series – Round #2	(United Kingdom) Fort William	1	Danny Hart (GBR); Nina Hoffmann (GER)	Laurie Greenland (GBR); Valentina Höll (AUT)	Matt Walker (GBR); Veronika Widmann (ITA)	
7–8 May	Downhill De Boticas – #4 Taça de Portugal Downhill	(Portugal) Boticas	1	Pau Menoyo (ESP); Margarida Bandeira (POR)	Simon Chapelet (FRA); Estefanía Cabarcos (POR)	Cédric Taillefer (FRA); Virginia García-Loygorri (ESP)	
8 May	Costa Degli Etruschi Epic	(Italy) Marina di Bibbona	2	Francesco Casagrande (ITA); Sandra Mairhofer (ITA)	Héctor Leonardo Páez (COL); Claudia Peretti (ITA)	Ole Hem (NOR); Debora Piana (ITA)	
8 May	Epica Las Navas Scott	(Spain) Las Navas del Marqués	2	Juan Ignacio Pérez (ESP); Cristina Morán Roza (ESP)	Francesc Guerra Carretero (ESP); Estefanía Gutiérrez (ESP)	Guillem Cassú Cantin (ESP); Sophie Johnson (GBR)	
8 May	Koramaz Valley MTB Cup	(Turkey) Kayseri	2	Denis Sergiyenko (KAZ); Alina Sarkulova (KAZ)	Süleyman Temel (TUR)	Temirlan Mukhamediyanov (KAZ)	
8 May	SoHo Bicycle Festival XCO	(United States) Midway	2	Logan Sadesky (CAN); Sofia Forney (USA)	Samuel Elson (USA); Tai-Lee Smith (USA)	Cobe Freeburn (USA); Erin Osborne (USA)	
12 May	Mimar Sinan MTB Cup	(Turkey) Kayseri	3	Süleyman Temel (TUR); Alina Sarkulova (KAZ)	Denis Sergiyenko (KAZ); Azize Bekar (TUR)	Yegor Karassyov (KAZ); Sevim Gerçek (TUR)	
14 May	Koramaz Eleminator MTB Cup	(Turkey) Kayseri	3	Süleyman Temel (TUR); Alina Sarkulova (KAZ)	Denis Sergiyenko (KAZ); Azize Bekar (TUR)	Emre Yavuz (TUR); Sevim Gerçek (TUR)	
14 May	Cycling at the 2021 Southeast Asian Games	(Vietnam) Hòa Bình	3	Zaenal Fanani (INA) (XCO); Đinh Thị Như Quỳnh (VIE) (XCO); Methasit Boonsane (THA) (Downhill); Tiara Andini Prastika (INA) (Downhill)	Muhammad Ihza (INA) (XCO); Nur Assyira Zainal Abidin (MAS) (XCO); Andy Prayoga (INA) (Downhill); Vipavee Deekaballes (THA) (Downhill)	Jerico Rivera Cruz (PHI) (XCO); Natahsya Soon (MAS) (XCO); John Derick Farr (PHI) (Downhill); Naomi Gardoce Mapanao (PHI) (Downhill)	
14–15 May	Reto Hacienda Sabanera	(Puerto Rico) Cidra	2	Georwill Pérez (PUR); Suheily Rodríguez (PUR); Jacob Morales (PUR) (XCC); Suheily Rodríguez (PUR) (XCC)	Jacob Morales (PUR); Alexa López (MEX); Georwill Pérez (PUR) (XCC); Alexa López (MEX) (XCC)	Ricky Morales (PUR); Annelly Vázquez (PUR); Ricky Morales (PUR) (XCC); Vannesa Bracero (PUR) (XCC)	
15 May	MTB Weekend Eupen	(Belgium) Eupen	2	Niels Derveaux (BEL); Larissa Hartog (NED)	Kevin Panhuyzen (BEL); Coline Clauzure (FRA)	Hugo Boulanger (FRA); Femke Mossinkoff (NED)	
15 May	Primacup Stolové Hory	(Czech Republic) Machov	2	Marek Rauchfuss (CZE); Milena Kalašová (CZE)	Filip Adel (CZE); Michalina Ziółkowska (POL)	Alexander Stadler (AUT); Nikol Flašarová (CZE)	
15 May	Shimano MTB Liga #2	(Denmark) Roskilde	2	Tobias Lillelund (DEN); Ann-Dorthe Lisbygd (DEN)	Jonas Lindberg (DEN); Janni Spangsberg (DEN)	Viktor Lindquist (SWE); Viktoria Knudsen (DEN)	
15 May	Jura Bike Marathon	(Switzerland) Vallorbe	1	Martin Fanger (SUI); Adelheid Morath (GER)	Urs Huber (SUI); Estelle Morel (FRA)	Sascha Weber (GER); Bettina Janas (GER)	
15 May	Vekse MTB Cup	(Turkey) Kayseri	2	Denis Sergiyenko (KAZ); Alina Sarkulova (KAZ)	Yegor Karassyov (KAZ); Azize Bekar (TUR)	Emre Yavuz (TUR); Sevim Gerçek (TUR)	
19–22 May	Belgian Mountainbike Challenge (BeMC)	(Belgium) La Roche-en-Ardenne	S1	Hans Becking (NED); Bettina Janas (GER)	Laurens Sweeck (BEL); Mónica Calderón (COL)	Wout Alleman (BEL); Irina Lützelschwab (SUI)	
20 May	Rosh Haayin XCO #2	(Israel) Rosh HaAyin	1	Yotam Deshe (ISR); Na'ama Noyman (ISR)	Shlomi Haimy (ISR); Naomi Luria (ISR)	Tomer Zaltsman (ISR); Eleftheria Giachou (GRE)	
20–22 May	IXS Downhill Cup – Willingen	(Germany) Willingen	2	Cédric Taillefer (FRA); Sabine Vicze (GER)	Ian Guionnet (FRA); Justine Welzel (GER)	Timo Pries (GER); Steffi Marth (GER)	
20 May	Englewood Open XCC	(United States) Fall River	1	Brian Matter (USA); Hannah Otto (USA)	Cole Punchard (CAN); Sofia Forney (USA)	Tyler Clark (CAN); Lauren Lackman (USA)	
21 May	Czech MTB Cup	(Czech Republic) Zadov	1	Anton Cooper (NZL); Lia Schrievers (GER)	Georg Egger (GER); Steffi Häberlin (SUI)	Bartłomiej Wawak (POL); Jitka Čábelická (CZE)	
21 May	SCOTT BIKE Marathon	(Germany) Willingen	2	Urs Huber (SUI); Katrin Schwing (GER)	Andreas Seewald (GER); Sara Michielsens (BEL)	Simon Schneller (GER); Rozanne Slik (NED)	
21 May	Englewood Open XCO	(United States) Fall River	1	Luke Vrouwenvelder (USA); Hannah Otto (USA)	Carson Beckett (USA); Emily Batty (CAN)	Tyler Clark (CAN); Sofia Forney (USA)	
21–22 May	Coupe de Japon MTB Yawatahama International MTB Race 2022	(Japan) Yawatahama	HC	Ryo Takeuchi (JPN); Akari Kobayashi (JPN)	Riki Kitabayashi (JPN); Urara Kawaguchi (JPN)	Asahi Miyazu (JPN); Yuuka Yabuki (JPN)	
21–22 May	Clásico de Florida	(Puerto Rico) Florida	2	Georwill Pérez (PUR); Suheily Rodríguez (PUR); Jacob Morales (PUR) (XCC); Alexa López (MEX) (XCC)	Jacob Morales (PUR); Alexa López (MEX); Georwill Pérez (PUR) (XCC); Annelly Oviedo (PUR) (XCC)	Jonathan Marrero (PUR); Chelmary Sánchez (PUR); Ricky Morales (PUR) (XCC); Suheily Rodríguez (PUR) (XCC)	
22 May	Göteborg MTB Race	(Sweden) Gothenburg	1	Mats Tubaas Glende (NOR); Jenny Rissveds (SWE)	Knut Røhme (NOR); Linn Gustafzzon (SWE)	André Eriksson (SWE); Ingrid Bøe Jacobsen (NOR)	
22 May	Abierto Argentino XCO #2	(Argentina) Salta	2	Hilvar Yamid Malaver (COL); Agustina María Apaza (ARG)	Joaquín Plomer (ARG); Inés Gutiérrez (ARG)	Dario Gasco (ARG); Leidy Mera (COL)	
22 May	Shark Attack Bike-Festival 2022	(Germany) Lennestadt	2	David List (GER); Lotte Koopmans (NED)	Niklas Schehl (GER); Theresia Schwenk (GER)	Lennart-Jan Krayer (GER); Rosa van Doorn (NED)	
22 May	24. Kamniski Kros – SloXcup	(Slovenia) Kamnik	1	Daniele Braidot (ITA); Yana Belomoyna (UKR)	Filippo Fontana (ITA); Giada Specia (ITA)	Oleksandr Hudyma (UKR); Tanja Žakelj (SVN)	
22 May	Superprestigio MTB #3	(Spain) Tibi	2	David Valero (ESP); Rebecca McConnell (AUS)	Ismael Esteban (ESP); Estíbaliz Sagardoy (ESP)	Ricardo Marinheiro (POR); Alice Pirard (BEL)	
27 May	Huskvarna MTB-Tour	(Sweden) Huskvarna	1	Mats Tubaas Glende (NOR); Emma Belforth (SWE)	Emil Lindgren (SWE); Hanna Millved (SWE)	Axel Lindh (SWE); Sara Öberg (SWE)	
27–29 May	MTB French Cup – XCO/XCE/XCC	(France) Le Bessat	1	Titouan Carod (FRA) (XCO); Loana Lecomte (FRA) (XCO); Titouan Perrin-Ganier (FRA) (XCE); Léa Houyvet (FRA) (XCE); Titouan Carod (FRA) (XCC); Line Burquier (FRA) (XCC)	Jordan Sarrou (FRA) (XCO); Line Burquier (FRA) (XCO); Thibaut Kahlhoven (FRA) (XCE); Ilona Moulin (FRA) (XCE); Maxime Loret (FRA) (XCC); Léna Gérault (FRA) (XCC)	Stéphane Tempier (FRA) (XCO); Léna Gérault (FRA) (XCO); Maxence Lemardelé (FRA) (XCE); Amandine Vidon (FRA) (XCE); Mathis Azzaro (FRA) (XCC); Hélène Clauzel (FRA) (XCC)	
27–29 May	iXS Downhill Cup - Winterberg + BMO 4X Rumble	(Germany) Winterberg	2	Tristan Botteram (NED) (DHI); Tracey Hannah (AUS) (DHI); Tomáš Slavík (CZE) (4X); Michaela Hájková (CZE) (4X)	George Brannigan (NZL) (DHI); Anna Newkirk (USA) (DHI); Hannes Slavik (AUT) (4X); Josie McFall (GBR) (4X)	Christopher Grice (USA) (DHI); Abigail Hogie (USA) (DHI); Adrien Loron (FRA) (4X) (4X)	
28–29 May	National Downhill Series - Round #3	(United Kingdom) Llangollen	2	Laurie Greenland (GBR); Phoebe Gale (GBR)	Jordan Williams (GBR); Stacey Fisher (GBR)	Charlie Hatton (GBR); Katherine Sharp (GBR)	
28–29 May	Portugal Cup XCO - Fundão International XCO	(Portugal) Fundão	1	Ricardo Marinheiro (POR); Raquel Queirós (POR)	Roberto Ferreira (POR); Joana Monteiro (POR)	Pablo Rodríguez Guede (ESP); Lara Lois (ESP)	
28–29 May	Mountain Creek Spring National	(United States) Vernon Township	2	Dakotah Norton (USA); Frida Helena Rønning (NOR)	Neko Mulally (USA); Mazie Hayden (USA)	Tristan Lemire (CAN); Abigail Ronca (USA)	
29 May	UK National Cross Country Series Round #4	(United Kingdom) Cannock Chase	2	Charlie Aldridge (GBR); Elena McGorum (GBR)	Cameron Mason (GBR); Jane Barr (GBR)	Rory McGuire (GBR); Joanne Thom (GBR)	
29 May	TerasCAF Seri 2	(Indonesia) Sleman Regency	2	Rendy Sanjaya (INA); Riska Agustina (INA)	Mohammad Hakim (INA); Ayu Andriana (INA)	Ady Pratama (INA); Millatul Khaqimah (INA)	
29 May	Pressingowa Petarda MTB XCO Jastrzębie-Zdrój	(Poland) Jastrzębie-Zdrój	3	Krzysztof Łukasik (POL); Klaudia Czabok (POL)	Karol Ostaszewski (POL); Gabriela Wojtyła (POL)	Piotr Brzózka (POL); Antonina Bialek (POL)	
29 May	XCO Drozdovo	(Slovakia) Nová Baňa	1	Bartłomiej Wawak (POL); Aleksandra Podgórska (POL)	Matthew Wilson (NZL); Matylda Szczecińska (POL)	Filip Helta (POL); Barbora Průdková (CZE)	
29 May	XCO Kocevje	(Slovenia) Dolga Vas, Kočevje	1	Ben Oliver (NZL); Yana Belomoyna (UKR)	Rok Naglič (SVN); Vita Movrin (SVN)	Dmytro Titarenko (UKR); Iryna Popova (UKR)	
29 May	Copa Catalana Internacional BTT #5	(Spain) Cala Ratjada	1	David Campos Motos (ESP); Lucía Gómez Andreu (ESP)	Axel Roudil-Cortinat (FRA); Estíbaliz Sagardoy (ESP)	Ever Alejandro Gómez (BOL); Natalia Fischer (ESP)	
29 May	MTB Eliminator National Series Bodrum	(Turkey) Bodrum	3	Lorenzo Serres (FRA); Didi de Vries (NED)	Erick Fierro (ECU); Elodie Kuijper (NED)	Anton Olstam (SWE); Semra Yetiş (TUR)	

=== June ===
Date	Race Name	Location	Class	Winner	Second	Third	Ref
1–5 June	Enduro World Series #1 – Tweed Valley	(United Kingdom) Glentress Forest	3	Richard Rude Jr. (USA); Ella Conolly (GBR); Edgar Carballo (ESP) (E-MTB); Laura Charles (FRA) (E-MTB)	Jesse Melamed (CAN); Rebecca Baraona (GBR); Andrea Garibbo (ITA) (E-MTB); Tracy Moseley (GBR) (E-MTB)	Innes Graham (GBR); Isabeau Courdurier (FRA); Leigh Johnson (GBR) (E-MTB); Alia Marcellini (ITA) (E-MTB)	
3–5 June	iXS European Downhill Cup - Semmering	(Austria) Semmering	1	Stefano Introzzi (ITA); Marlena Neißl (AUT)	Mael Gironde (FRA); Lisa Gava (ITA)	Austin Dooley (USA); Sophie Gutöhrle (AUT)	
4 June	Raiffeisen Österreich Grand Prix	(Austria) Windhaag bei Perg	1	Gerhard Kerschbaumer (ITA); Laura Stigger (AUT)	Max Foidl (AUT); Haley Batten (USA)	Mario Bair (AUT); Zoe Cuthbert (AUS)	
4 June	Baie-Saint-Paul Canada Cup XCC	(Canada) Baie-Saint-Paul	3	Carter Woods (CAN); Laurie Arseneault (CAN)	Quinton Disera (CAN); Jocelyn Stel (CAN)	Gunnar Holmgren (CAN); Emily Batty (CAN)	
4 June	Czech MTB Cup	(Czech Republic) Bedřichov	1	Marek Rauchfuss (CZE); Jitka Čábelická (CZE)	Lukáš Kobes (CZE); Jana Czeczinkarová (CZE)	Jan Vastl (CZE); Karla Štěpánová (CZE)	
4 June	Mythic Chrono	(France) Samoëns	2	Martin Fanger (SUI); Estelle Morel (FRA)	Hugo Drechou (FRA); Margot Moschetti (FRA)	Florent Pelizzari (FRA); Julie Bresset (FRA)	
4 June	Memorial Bruno Alverà	(Italy) Pergine Valsugana	2	Filippo Fontana (ITA); Giorgia Marchet (ITA)	Gioele Bertolini (ITA); Candice Lill (ZAF)	Juri Zanotti (ITA); Eva Lechner (ITA)	
4 June	Maja Włoszczowska MTB Race	(Poland) Jelenia Góra	HC	Ondřej Cink (CZE); Lia Schrievers (GER)	Cameron Orr (GBR); Aleksandra Podgórska (POL)	Charlie Aldridge (GBR); Matylda Szczecińska (POL)	
4 June	SA XCO Cup Series	(South Africa) Gauteng	1	Philip Buys (ZAF); Janice Venter (ZAF)	Arno du Toit (ZAF); Rimari Sutton (ZAF)	Wessel Botha (ZAF); Lehane Oosthuizen (ZAF)	
4–5 June	Vulkan-Race Gedern	(Germany) Gedern	2	Niklas Schehl (GER); Finja Lipp (GER)	David List (GER); Elisabeth Brandau (GER)	Alex Bregenzer (GER); Romana Carfora (NED)	
4–5 June	Nilsbyen Race Weekend	(Norway) Trondheim	2	Knut Røhme (NOR); Ingrid Bøe Jacobsen (NOR)	Mats Tubaas Glende (NOR); Sigrid Andrea Fløgstad (NOR)	William Høines Larsen (NOR); Hedda Brenningen Bjørklund (NOR)	
5 June	David Valero - Baza Ced - XCO	(Spain) Baza	2	David Valero (ESP); Natalia Fischer (ESP)	David Campos Motos (ESP); Estíbaliz Sagardoy (ESP)	Ever Alejandro Gómez (BOL); Rocío del Alba García (ESP)	
5 June	XCO - Kumanovo	(North Macedonia) Kumanovo	1	Martin Haring (SVK); Alexandra Adam (GRE)	Rok Naglič (SVN); Erika Glajzová (SVK)	Dimitrios Antoniadis (GRE); Eirini Maria Karousou (GRE)	
5 June	Copa Internacional Mezuena V2	(Colombia) Chía	3	Camilo Gómez (COL); Angie Milena Lara (COL)	Ivan Felipe Lopez (COL); Isabella García (COL)	Sebastian Navarrete (COL); Natalia Duarte (COL)	
5 June	Baie-Saint-Paul Canada Cup XCO	(Canada) Baie-Saint-Paul	3	Léandre Bouchard (CAN); Emily Batty (CAN)	Carter Woods (CAN); Laurie Arseneault (CAN)	Quinton Disera (CAN); Roxane Vermette (CAN)	
5 June	Shimano MTB Liga #3 - Randers	(Denmark) Randers	1	Jonas Lindberg (DEN); Caroline Bohé (DEN)	Sebastian Fini Carstensen (DEN); Sofie Pedersen (DEN)	Tobias Lillelund (DEN); Malene Degn (DEN)	
5 June	XCO Samobor	(Croatia) Samobor	1	Alessio Agostinelli (ITA); Yana Belomoyna (UKR)	Daniele Braidot (ITA); Tanja Žakelj (SVN)	Karl Markt (AUT); Vita Movrin (SVN)	
5 June	UCI MTB Marathon Series - Bike Maraton Jelenia Góra	(Poland) Jelenia Góra	SR	Andreas Seewald (GER); Lejla Tanović (BIH)	Petr Vakoč (CZE); Janina Wüst (SUI)	Jakob Hartmann (GER); Kataržina Sosna (LTU)	
6 June	3 Nations MTB Cup Genk	(Belgium) Genk	3	Jens Adams (BEL); Fem van Empel (NED)	Niels Derveaux (BEL); Ceylin del Carmen Alvarado (NED)	Jarne Vandersteen (BEL); Larissa Hartog (NED)	
10–11 June	Missoula XC	(United States) Missoula	1	Riley Amos (USA); Hannah Otto (USA); Riley Amos (USA) (XCC); Hannah Otto (USA) (XCC)	Brayden Johnson (USA); Evelyn Dong (USA); Brayden Johnson (USA) (XCC); Ruth Holcomb (USA) (XCC)	Austin Beard (USA); Ruth Holcomb (USA); Lukas Vrouwenvelder (USA) (XCC); Emily Williams (CAN) (XCC)	
10–12 June	Naturland Enduro Race	(Andorra) Sant Julià de Lòria	3	Álex Iscla Grandvallet (AND); Sara Gay Moreno (ESP)	Jordan Prochyra (AUS); Ares Masip Ibañez (ESP)	Ferrán Jorba Prats (ESP); Alba Lara Rosé (ESP)	
10–12 June	IV Copa Nacional MTB GW-Shimano	(Colombia) Zipaquirá	2	Jhonnatan Botero (COL); Gloria Garzón Melo (COL)	Fabio Castañeda (COL); Ana Maria Roa Muñoz (COL)	Juan Fernando Monroy (COL); Angie Lara (COL)	
11 June	Power Race Astorga	(Spain) Astorga	2	Julen Latorre Gulías (ESP); María Díaz Pernía (ESP)	Javier Busto Ramos (ESP); Susana Alonso (ESP)	Juan Ignacio Pérez (ESP); Cristina Morán Roza (ESP)	
11 June	Gaziantep MTB Cup	(Turkey) Gaziantep	2	Serdar Anıl Depe (TUR); Pelin Altekin (TUR)	Emre Yavuz (TUR); Helin Altekin (TUR)	Abdülkadir Kelleci (TUR)	
12 June	Shimano MTB Liga #4 - Varde	(Denmark) Varde	2	Jonas Lindberg (DEN); Janni Spangsberg (DEN)	Jakob Söderqvist (SWE); Viktoria Knudsen (DEN)	Klaus Nielsen (DEN); Line Mygdam (DEN)	
12 June	7R CST MTB Gdynia Maraton	(Poland) Gdynia	1	Paweł Bernas (POL); Aleksandra Andrzejewska (POL)	Krzysztof Łukasik (POL); Zuzanna Krzystała (POL)	Michał Glanz (POL); Klaudia Cichacka (POL)	
12 June	Kahramanmaras MTB Cup	(Turkey) Marash	2	Süleyman Temel (TUR); Pelin Altekın (TUR)	Serdar Anıl Depe (TUR); Helin Altekın (TUR)	Abdülkadir Kelleci (TUR); Zehra Kargın (TUR)	
15–19 June	Enduro World Series #2 – Petzen EWS + EWS-E	(Slovenia) Petzen	3	Jesse Melamed (CAN); Isabeau Courdurier (FRA); Yannick Pontal (FRA) (E-MTB); Alia Marcellini (ITA) (E-MTB)	Richard Rude Jr. (USA); Morgane Charre (FRA); Tiago Ladeira (POR) (E-MTB); Florencia Espiñeira Herreros (CHI) (E-MTB)	Jack Moir (AUS); Ella Conolly (AUS); Edgar Carballo (ESP) (E-MTB); Sofia Wiedenroth (GER) (E-MTB)	
15–19 June	Crankworx Innsbruck	(Austria) Innsbruck	1	Charlie Hatton (GBR); Valentina Höll (AUT)	Finn Iles (CAN); Tracey Hannah (AUS)	Michael Hannah (AUS); Anna Newkirk (USA)	
16 June	Canmore Canada Cup XCC	(Canada) Canmore	3	Quinton Disera (CAN); Hannah Otto (USA)	Raphaël Auclair (CAN); Sidney McGill (CAN)	Brayden Johnson (USA); Lauren Lackman (USA)	
17 June	Desafio Internacional Do Cerrado De MTB	(Brazil) Goiânia	3	Luiz Cocuzzi (BRA); Letícia Cândido (BRA)	José Gabriel (BRA); Raiza Goulão (BRA)	Nicolas Machado (BRA); Hercília Najara (BRA)	
17–19 June	Copa Catalana Internacional - Vallnord - XCO - DHI	(Andorra) Vallnord	1	David Valero (ESP) (XCO); Malene Degn (DEN) (XCO); Pau Menoyo (ESP) (DHI); Myriam Nicole (FRA) (DHI)	Samuel Gaze (NZL) (XCO); Rocío del Alba García (ESP) (XCO); Loris Vergier (FRA) (DHI); Aina González (ESP) (DHI)	Jofre Cullell (ESP) (XCO); Na'ama Noyman (ISR) (XCO); Hugo Frixtalon (FRA) (DHI); Mireia Pi Madrenas (ESP) (DHI)	
18 June	Watersley	(Netherlands) Sittard	1	Daan Soete (BEL); Puck Pieterse (NED)	Jens Adams (BEL); Fem van Empel (NED)	Erno McCrae (BEL); Émeline Detilleux (BEL)	
18 June	Hero Südtirol Dolomites - XCM	(Italy) Sëlva	1	Héctor Leonardo Páez (COL); Adelheid Morath (GER)	Diego Alfonso Arias (COL); Debora Piana (ITA)	Gerhard Kerschbaumer (ITA); Elena Gaddoni (ITA)	
18 June	XCO Csömör Magyar Kupa	(Hungary) Csömör	2	Zsombor Palumby (HUN); Virág Buzsáki (HUN)	Matej Ulík (SVK); Csenge Anna Bokros (HUN)	Matjaž Lozar (SVN); Regina Schmidel (HUN)	
18–19 June	Proffix Swiss Bike Cup Gränichen	(Switzerland) Gränichen	1	Vital Albin (SUI); Ramona Forchini (SUI)	Andri Frischknecht (SUI); Line Burquier (FRA)	Joel Roth (SUI); Rebecca McConnell (AUS)	
18–19 June	Taça Brasil De Cross Country - Etapa Goiânia	(Brazil) Goiânia	1	Henrique Avancini (BRA); Raiza Goulão (BRA)	Jhonnatan Botero Villegas (COL); Hercília Najara (BRA)	José Gabriel (BRA); Letícia Cândido (BRA)	
18–19 June	Internacional Estrada Real	(Brazil) Tiradentes	1	Bruno Martins Lemes (BRA) (XCM); Lorena Ferraz (BRA) (XCM); Sebastian Miranda (CHI) (XCC); Liege Walter (BRA) (XCC)	Luiz Miguel Campos Honório (BRA) (XCM); Liege Walter (BRA) (XCM); Thiago Freitas (BRA) (XCC); Erika Gramiscelli (BRA) (XCC)	Sebastián Gesche Antona (CHI) (XCM); Ana Luísa Korc Panini (BRA) (XCM); Bruno Martins Lemes (BRA) (XCC); Ana Luísa Korc Panini (BRA) (XCC)	
18–19 June	MTB French Cup–DHI	(France) Les Deux Alpes	1	Valentin Chatanay (FRA); Mariana Salazar (SLV)	Thibault Laly (FRA); Lauryne Chappaz (FRA)	Simon Chapelet (FRA); Léona Pierrini (FRA)	
18–19 June	Canmore Canada Cup XCO	(Canada) Canmore	3	Peter Disera (CAN); Hannah Otto (USA)	Quinton Disera (CAN); Laurie Arseneault (CAN)	Owen Clark (CAN); Juliette Larose-Gingras (CAN)	
19 June	Górale na Start	(Poland) Wałbrzych	2	Bartłomiej Wawak (POL); Matylda Szczecińska (POL)	Filip Helta (POL); Aleksandra Podgórska (POL)	Jan Škarnitzl (CZE); Gabriela Wojtyła (POL)	
19 June	Grazer Bike-Opening Stattegg	(Austria) Graz	1	Max Foidl (AUT); Janka Keseg Števková (SVK)	Jan Vastl (CZE); Nadja Heigl (AUT)	Sven Strähle (GER); Francesca Saccu (ITA)	
19 June	Courmayer MTB Event	(Italy) Courmayeur	1	Juri Zanotti (ITA); Giorgia Marchet (ITA)	Gioele Bertolini (ITA); Eva Lechner (ITA)	Alessio Agostinelli (ITA); Noemi Plankensteiner (ITA)	
19 June	Lugnet XCO	(Sweden) Falun	1	Emil Lindgren (SWE); Jenny Rissveds (SWE)	Axel Lindh (SWE); Linn Gustafzzon (SWE)	Niko Heikkilä (FIN); Emma Belforth (SWE)	
22 June	Kiremitliktepe MTB Cup	(Turkey) Erzurum	3	Emre Yavuz (TUR); Alexandra Adam (GRE)	Zeki Kaygısız (TUR); Eirini Karousou (GRE)	Süleyman Temel (TUR); Pelin Altekın (TUR)	
23 June	Palandöken MTB Cup	(Turkey) Erzurum	2	Emre Yavuz (TUR); Alexandra Adam (GRE)	Dimitrios Antoniadis (GRE); Eirini Karousou (GRE)	Abdülkadir Kelleci (TUR); Pelin Altekın (TUR)	
23–26 June	Alpentour Trophy	(Austria) Schladming	S1	Héctor Leonardo Páez (COL); Greete Steinburg (EST)	Daniel Geismayr (AUT); Vanessa Schmidt (GER)	Frans Claes (BEL); Nellie Larsson (SWE)	
23–26 June	Enduro World Series – Canazei	(Italy) Canazei	3	Richard Rude Jr. (USA); Isabeau Courdurier (FRA)	Jesse Melamed (CAN); Morgane Charre (FRA)	Edward Masters (NZL); Harriet Harnden (GBR)	
24 June	Race XCM Arica	(Chile) Arica	2	Sebastián Gesche Antona (CHI); Paz Leiva (CHI)	Eyair Astudillo (CHI); Jimena Rimassa (PER)	Moises Orellana (CHI)	
24–25 June	E-Tour of Salzburger Land	(Austria) Flachau	3	Jérôme Gilloux (FRA); Nicole Göldi (SUI)	Andrea Garibbo (ITA); Nathalie Schneitter (SUI)	Kenny Müller (FRA); Léa Deslandes (FRA)	
25 June	5# Internazionali d'Italia Series - La Thuile	(Italy) La Thuile	HC	Luca Braidot (ITA); Martina Berta (ITA)	Nadir Colledani (ITA); Giada Specia (ITA)	Juri Zanotti (ITA); Evie Richards (GBR)	
25 June	Whistler Canada Cup XCO	(Canada) Whistler	2	Peter Disera (CAN); Sandra Walter (CAN)	Logan Sadesky (CAN); Juliette Larose-Gingras (CAN)	Robbie Day (USA); Emily Williams (CAN)	
25 June	Nova Bike Maraton Drásal	(Czech Republic) Holešov	2	Lubomír Petruš (CZE); Zuzana Boháčová (CZE)	Matouš Ulman (CZE); Michaela Bojková (CZE)	Marek Bartůněk (CZE); Anna Hofmann (AUT)	
25–26 June	CIMTB Michelin - XCO/XCC	(Brazil) Araxá	HC	Henrique Avancini (BRA); Raiza Goulão (BRA); Henrique Avancini (BRA) (XCC); Raiza Goulão (BRA) (XCC)	José Gabriel Marques (BRA); Hercília Najara (BRA); José Gabriel Marques (BRA) (XCC); Hercília Najara (BRA) (XCC)	Guilherme Müller (BRA); Letícia Cândido (BRA); Guilherme Müller (BRA) (XCC); Isabella Lacerda (BRA) (XCC)	
26 June	Rothaus Hegau Bike Marathon 2022	(Germany) Singen	HC	Konny Looser (SUI); Vera Looser (NAM)	Alex Miller (NAM); Samara Sheppard (NZL)	Simon Schneller (GER); Antonia Daubermann (GER)	
26 June	UK National Cross Country Series Round #5	(United Kingdom) St Austell	1	Cameron Orr (GBR); Isla Short (GBR)	Charlie Aldridge (GBR); Anna Flynn (GBR)	Cameron Mason (GBR); Elena McGorum (GBR)	
26 June	3 Nations Cup - Vayamundo MTB Cup	(Belgium) Houffalize	1	Clément Horny (BEL); Puck Pieterse (NED)	Chris van Dijk (NED); Émeline Detilleux (BEL)	Arne Janssens (BEL); Romana Carfora (NED)	
26 June	Superprestigio MTB #4	(Spain) Estella-Lizarra	1	Ismael Esteban Agüero (ESP); Estíbaliz Sagardoy (ESP)	Thibault Soula (FRA); Natalia Fischer (ESP)	Cristofer Bosque Ruano (ESP); Raquel Queirós (POR)	
26 June	Akçadağ Levent Vadisi MTB Cup	(Turkey) Malatya	2	Dimitrios Antoniadis (GRE); Alexandra Adam (GRE)	Zeki Kaygısız (TUR); Eirini Karousou (GRE)	Süleyman Temel (TUR); Helin Altekın (TUR)	
29 June–2 July	Andorra MTB Classic	(Andorra) La Massana	S2	Georg Egger (GER); Lukas Baum (GER); Naima Diesner (GER); Meritxell Figueras Garangou (ESP)	Hans Becking (NED); Hugo Drechou (FRA); Karina Neumann (ECU); Margarita Endara (ECU)	Simon Schneller (GER); Alban Lakata (AUT); Marta Ballús (AND); Carla Boj (ESP)	
30 June–3 July	Enduro World Series – Valberg - EWS-E	(France) Valberg	3	Alex Rudeau (FRA); Laura Charles (FRA)	Adrien Dailly (FRA); Florencia Espiñeira (CHI)	Antoine Rogge (FRA)	

=== July ===
Date	Race Name	Location	Class	Winner	Second	Third	Ref
1–3 July	Engadin Bike Giro	(Switzerland) St. Moritz	S2	Andreas Seewald (GER); Adelheid Morath (GER)	Sascha Weber (GER); Milena Kalašová (CZE)	Nicolas Samparisi (ITA); Bettina Janas (GER)	
2 July	MB Race - XCM	(France) Combloux	1	Rémi Groslambert (FRA); Estelle Morel (FRA)	Dominik Schwaiger (GER); Samara Sheppard (NZL)	Arnaud Rapillard (SUI); Camille Udny (FRA)	
2–3 July	Sul Mineiro de Mountain Bike	(Brazil) Lambari	2	Luiz Cocuzzi (BRA); Hercília Najara (BRA)	Ulan Bastos Galinski (BRA); Isabella Lacerda (BRA)	Guilherme Müller (BRA); Giuliana Morgen (BRA)	
2–3 July	MTB French Cup–DHI	(France) Les Arcs	1	Valentin Chatanay (FRA); Mathilde Bernard (FRA)	Charly Di Pasquale (FRA); Mariana Salazar (ESA)	Gaëtan Vigé (FRA); Lauryne Chappaz (FRA)	
2–3 July	iXS European Downhill Cup - Voss	(Norway) Voss	2	Simen Smestad (NOR); Julia Hensmanns (GER)	Tristan Botteram (NED); Katja Gallitzendörfer (GER)	Atle Laakso (NOR)	
2–3 July	Weissenfelser MTB Event XCO	(Germany) Weißenfels	2	Sven Strähle (GER); Jana Czeczinkarová (CZE)	Jan Škarnitzl (CZE); Lina Dorscht (GER)	Alex Bregenzer (GER); Jette Aelken (GER)	
8–9 July	4X Pro Tour - 4x Bike Madness 2022	(Czech Republic) Dobřany	3	Tomáš Slavík (CZE); Michaela Hájková (CZE)	Gustaw Dadela (POL); Andrea Hájková (CZE)	Tomáš Brožík (CZE); Josie Mcfall (GBR)	
8–10 July	26. Südtirol Dolomiti Superbike - XCM	(Italy) Niederdorf	HC	Héctor Leonardo Páez (COL); Claudia Peretti (ITA)	Andreas Seewald (GER); Adelheid Morath (GER)	Lubomír Petruš (CZE); Debora Piana (ITA)	
9 July	Banner Elk Showdown	(United States) Banner Elk	2	Carson Beckett (USA); Emily Werner (USA)	Kerry Werner (USA); Isabella Hyser (USA)	Scott McGill (USA); Sydney Wenger (USA)	
9–10 July	SilverStar Canada Cup DH	(Canada) Silver Star	2	Gabriel Neron (CAN); Bailey Goldstone (CAN)	Jackson Frew (AUS); Amy Ertel (CAN)	Samuel Thibault (CAN)	
15–16 July	4X Pro Tour - JBC 4X Revelations 2022	(Czech Republic) Jablonec nad Nisou	3	Tomáš Slavík (CZE); Anna Slancová (CZE)	Gustaw Dadela (POL); Josie McFall (GBR)	Peter Pala (CZE); Michaela Hájková (CZE)	
16–17 July	Clásico Balniario de Cerro Gordo	(Puerto Rico) Vega Alta	2	Jacob Morales (PUR); Suheily Rodríguez (PUR); Jacob Morales (PUR) (XCC); Annelly Oviedo (PUR) (XCC)	Georwill Pérez (PUR); Annelly Oviedo (PUR); Georwill Pérez (PUR) (XCC); Suheily Rodríguez (PUR) (XCC)	Jonathan Marrero (PUR); Bridalis Zea (PUR); Jonathan Marrero (PUR) (XCC); Bridalis Zea (PUR) (XCC)	
16–17 July	Sherbrooke Canada Cup XCO	(Canada) Sherbrooke	2	Malcolm Barton (CAN); Sidney McGill (CAN)	Austin Beard (USA); Julianne Sarrazin (CAN)	Tyler Clark (CAN); Emma Olson (CAN)	
16–17 July	Fernie Canada Cup DH	(Canada) Fernie	2	Jackson Frew (AUS); Claire Buchar (CAN)	Gabriel Neron (CAN); Emmy Lan (CAN)	Haydyn Wynter (CAN); Sophia Ervington (CAN)	
17 July	Coupe Québec Merkur	(Canada) Sherbrooke	3	Malcolm Barton (CAN); Julianne Sarrazin (CAN)	Tyler Clark (CAN); Christel Ferrier-Bruneau (CAN)	Vincent Thiboutot (CAN); Emily Williams (CAN)	
17 July	MTB Eliminator National Series Sittard	(Netherlands) Sittard	3	Stephan Mayer (GER); Annemoon van Dienst (NED)	Felix Klausmann (GER); Liv Pijpers (BEL)	Erick Fierro Proaño (ECU); Dirkje Cox (NED)	
18–22 July	Transmaurienne Vanoise	(France) Val-Cenis–Aussois	S2	Bruno Vitali (SUI); Estelle Morel (FRA)	Hans Becking (NED); Margot Moschetti (FRA)	Sébastien Carabin (BEL); Costanza Fasolis (ITA)	
20 July	Panorama Canada Cup DH	(Canada) Panorama	2	Jackson Frew (AUS); Claire Buchar (CAN)	Gabriel Neron (CAN); Emmy Lan (CAN)	Jack Pelland (CAN); Bailey Goldstone (CAN)	
23–24 July	iXS Downhill Cup - Ilmenau	(Germany) Ilmenau	2	Max Hartenstern (GER); Nina Hoffmann (GER)	Tristan Botteram (NED); Ramona Kupferschmied (SUI)	Bryn Dickerson (NZL); Anna Charlotte Germann (GER)	
23–24 July	MTB French Cup - DHI	(France) Valberg	1	Valentin Chatanay (FRA); Lisa Bouladou (FRA)	Ian Guionnet (FRA); Adélina Fontaine (FRA)	Nathan Pontvianne (FRA); Emily Horridge (GBR)	
29–30 July	E-Tour de la Haute Tarentaise - E-MTB	(France) Tignes	3	Hugo Pigeon (FRA); Laura Charles (FRA)	Jérôme Gilloux (FRA); Nicole Göldi (SUI)	Kenny Muller (FRA); Nathalie Schneitter (SUI)	
30 July	Kozara Grand Prix 2022	(Bosnia and Herzegovina) Prijedor	1	Martin Haring (SVK); Tereza Tvarůžková (CZE)	Fabio Püntener (SUI); Lejla Tanović (BIH)	Cristian Bernardi (ITA); Kim Ames (GER)	
30 July	M3 Montafon MTB Marathon	(Austria) Schruns	2	Urs Huber (SUI); Adelheid Morath (GER)	Caleb Kieninger (GER); Milena Kalašová (CZE)	Frans Claes (BEL); Bianca Morvillo (ITA)	
30–31 July	Pamporovo Bike Fest	(Bulgaria) Pamporovo	1	Alexandros Topkaroglou (GRE); Denitsa Tosheva (BUL)	Dimitar Mazheykov (BUL); Evelina Zafeiri (GRE)	Stivian Gatev (BUL)	
30–31 July	Internacional Estrada Real #4	(Brazil) Arcos	1	Luiz Miguel Campos (BRA); Lorena Marques Ferras (BRA); Rubens Donizete (BRA) (XCC); Isabella Lacerda (BRA) (XCC)	Carlos Alberto Olimpio (BRA); Maysa Batista Ribeiro (BRA); Edson Gilmar de Rezende (BRA) (XCC); Karen Olímpio (BRA) (XCC)	Edson Gilmar de Rezende (BRA); Silvana Fátima Chaves (BRA); Mário Couto Grego (BRA) (XCC); Lorena Marques Ferras (BRA) (XCC)	
31 July	Grand Prix Bihać	(Bosnia and Herzegovina) Bihać	1	Alessio Agostinelli (ITA); Tereza Tvarůžková (CZE)	Fabio Püntener (SUI); Lejla Tanović (BIH)	Matej Ulík (SVK); Kim Ames (GER)	
31 July	Abierto Argentino de XCO #4	(Argentina) Ciudad Perico	2	Catriel Soto (ARG); Agustina María Apaza (ARG)	Joel Fernando Contreras (ARG); Inés Gutiérrez (ARG)	Álvaro Macías (ARG); Florencia Anabel Ávila (ARG)	
31 July	Xanthi - Balkan Championship MTB XCO Race	(Greece) Xanthi	2	Ede Molnár (ROU); Eleftheria Giachou (GRE)	Patrick Pescaru (ROU); Eirini Maria Karousou (GRE)	Dimitrios Antoniadis (GRE); Suzanne Hilbert (ROU)	

=== August ===
Date	Race Name	Location	Class	Winner	Second	Third	Ref
3 August	Cycling at the 2022 Commonwealth Games	(United Kingdom) Cannock Chase–Rugeley	3	Sam Gaze (NZL); Evie Richards (ENG)	Ben Oliver (NZL); Zoe Cuthbert (AUS)	Alex Miller (NAM); Candice Lill (RSA)	
3–6 August	Ischgl Ironbike Stage Race	(Austria) Ischgl	S1	Andreas Seewald (GER); Claudia Peretti (ITA)	Héctor Leonardo Páez (COL); Adelheid Morath (GER)	Martin Stošek (CZE); Amy Wakefield (RSA)	
4–7 August	Rothaus Bike Giro Hochschwarzwald	(Germany) Grafenhausen–Todtnau	S2	Tiago Ferreira (POR); Janina Wüst (SUI)	Simon Stiebjahn (GER); Rosa van Doorn (NED)	Simon Schneller (GER); Janine Schneider (GER)	
4–7 August	Enduro World Series – Whistler	(Canada) Whistler	3	Jesse Melamed (CAN); Harriet Harnden (GBR)	Jack Moir (AUS); Morgane Charre (FRA)	Rémi Gauvin (CAN); Florencia Espiñeira Herrero (CHI)	
6 August	CIMTB Michelin - XCC	(Brazil) Taubaté	3	José Gabriel Marques (BRA); Raiza Goulão (BRA)	Ulan Galinski (BRA); Isabella Lacerda (BRA)	Nicolas Machado (BRA); Hercília Najara (BRA)	
6 August	Triada MTB Păltiniș	(Romania) Păltiniș	1	Martin Haring (SVK); Regina Schmidel (HUN)	Dmytro Titarenko (UKR); Iryna Popova (UKR)	Matej Ulík (SVK); Iryna Slobodyan (UKR)	
6–7 August	Silampari Cycling 2022	(Indonesia) Lubuklinggau	2				
7 August	CIMTB Michelin - XCO	(Brazil) Taubaté	1	José Gabriel Marques (BRA); Raiza Goulão (BRA)	Guilherme Muller (BRA); Isabella Lacerda (BRA)	Gustavo Xavier (BRA); Hercília Najara (BRA)	
7 August	UCI XCO Porac	(Slovakia) Poráč	2	Filip Helta (POL); Tereza Tvarůžková (CZE)	Matthew Wilson (NZL); Aleksandra Podgórska (POL)	Martin Haring (SVK); Zuzanna Krzystała (POL)	
7 August	Copa Internacional Mezuena V3	(Colombia) Cajicá	3	Wldy Sandoval (COL); Angie Lara (COL)	Ivan Felipe López (COL); Ana María Briceño (COL)	Sebastian Navarrete (COL); Natalia Duarte (COL)	
10–12 August	E-Tour du Mont Blanc	(Switzerland) Verbier	3	Jérôme Gilloux (FRA); Nathalie Schneitter (SUI)	Théo Charmes (FRA); Laura Charles (FRA)	Kenny Muller (FRA); Anna Oberparleiter (ITA)	
11–14 August	Enduro World Series – Burke	(United States) Burke	3	Richard Rude Jr. (USA); Harriet Harnden (GBR)	Jack Moir (AUS); Morgane Charre (FRA)	Jesse Melamed (CAN); Rebecca Baraona (GBR)	
12 August	Sakarya MTB Cup	(Turkey) Adapazarı	HC	Ursin Spescha (SUI); Tanja Žakelj (SVN)	Alessio Agostinelli (ITA); Eleftheria Giachou (GRE)	Silas Graf (GER); Vita Movrin (SVN)	
13 August	Czech MTB Cup	(Czech Republic) Harrachov	1	Krzysztof Łukasik (POL); Isla Short (GBR)	Lukáš Kobes (CZE); Jitka Čábelická (CZE)	Philip Buys (RSA); Tereza Tvarůžková (CZE)	
13–14 August	MTB French Cup–DHI	(France) Châtel	1	Valentin Chatanay (FRA); Lisa Baumann (SUI)	Baptiste Pierron (FRA); Lisa Bouladou (FRA)	Romain Paulhan (FRA); Léona Pierrini (CZE)	
13–14 August	Oslo Terrengsykkelfestival	(Norway) Oslo	1	Emil Eid (NOR); Sara Öberg (SWE); Knut Røhme (NOR) (XCC); Ingrid Bøe Jacobsen (NOR) (XCC)	Mats Tubaas Glende (NOR); Mari-Liis Mõttus (EST); Ole Sigurd Rekdahl (NOR) (XCC); Mari-Liis Mõttus (EST) (XCC)	Ole Sigurd Rekdahl (NOR); Ingrid Bøe Jacobsen (NOR); Erik Hægstad (NOR) (XCC); Sara Öberg (SWE) (XCC)	
14 August	Nova Vysočina Arena Tour	(Czech Republic) Nové Město na Moravě	2	Tomáš Višňovský (SVK); Nikol Flašarová (CZE)	Karel Hník (CZE); Lenka Fridrichová (CZE)	Martin Stošek (CZE); Aneta Hovorková (CZE)	
14 August	MTB French Cup–XCO	(France) Dévoluy	1	Jordan Sarrou (FRA); Loana Lecomte (FRA)	Stéphane Tempier (FRA); Pauline Ferrand-Prévot (FRA)	Loan Cheneval (FRA); Line Burquier (FRA)	
14 August	Bike Race Langendorf	(Switzerland) Langendorf	2	Fabio Püntener (SUI); Alessandra Keller (SUI)	Luca Schätti (SUI); Linda Indergand (SUI)	Gustavo Xavier De Oliveira (BRA); Nadine Rieder (GER)	
14 August	UCI MTB Marathon Series – XCM	(Turkey) Sakarya	SR	Lubomír Petruš (CZE); Kataržina Sosna (LTU)	Oleksandr Koniaiev (UKR); Lejla Njemčević (BIH)	Nelson Vera (ESP); Stefanie Dohrn (GER)	
14 August	Kentville Canada Cup XCO	(Canada) Kentville	2	Victor Verreault (CAN); Eva Poidevin (CAN)	Malcolm Barton (CAN); Nicole Bradbury (CAN)	Logan Sadesky (CAN); Mackenzie Myatt (CAN)	
14 August	Canadian Open DH	(Canada) Whistler	3	Troy Brosnan (AUS); Tracey Hannah (AUS)	Peter Knott (AUS); Sian A'Hern (AUS)	Kye A'Hern (AUS); Louise-Anna Ferguson (GBR)	
14 August	Shimano MTB Liga #5 - Holte	(Denmark) Holte	2	Sebastian Fini Carstensen (DEN); Sofie Pedersen (DEN)	Simon Andreassen (DEN); Viktoria Smidth Knudsen (DEN)	Oliver Sølvhøj (DEN); Ann-Dorthe Lisbygd (DEN)	
16–20 August	Swiss Epic	(Switzerland) Arosa/Laax/Davos	S1	Fabian Rabensteiner (ITA); Bettina Janas (GER)	Daniel Geismayr (AUT); Adelheid Morath (GER)	Martin Frey (GER); Janina Wüst (SUI)	
17 August	Sakarya MTB Cup Night Race	(Turkey) Sakarya	3	Silas Graf (GER); Tatyana Geneleva (KAZ)	Ursin Spescha (SUI); Eleftheria Giachou (GRE)	Markus Eydt (GER); Alexandra Adam (GRE)	
18 August	Dieppe Canada Cup XCC	(Canada) Dieppe	3	Raphaël Auclair (CAN); Eva Poidevin (CAN)	Andrew L'Esperance (CAN); Haley Smith (CAN)	Logan Sadesky (CAN); Mackenzie Myatt (CAN)	
18–21 August	Enduro World Series - Sugarloaf	(United States) Sugarloaf	3	Jesse Melamed (CAN); Isabeau Courdurier (FRA)	Martin Maes (BEL); Rebecca Baraona (GBR)	Matt Walker (NZL); Ella Conolly (GBR)	
20 August	UCI MTB Marathon Series - Grand Raid BCVS - MTB Alpine Cup - XCM	(Switzerland) Verbier/Grimentz	SR	Andreas Seewald (GER); Claudia Peretti (ITA)	Urs Huber (SUI); Estelle Morel (FRA)	Simon Schneller (GER); Costanza Fasolis (ITA)	
20 August	Dieppe Canada Cup XCO	(Canada) Dieppe	2	Raphaël Auclair (CAN); Haley Smith (CAN)	Victor Verreault (CAN); Julianne Sarrazin (CAN)	Anthony Bergeron (CAN); Eva Poidevin (CAN)	
20–21 August	Proffix Swiss Bike Cup Basel	(Switzerland) Basel	1	Marcel Guerrini (SUI); Kate Courtney (USA)	Lars Forster (SUI); Giada Specia (ITA)	Anton Cooper (NZL); Noëlle Buri (SUI)	
20–21 August	20. BIA Mountainbike-Cup 2022	(Germany) Solingen	3	Tom Schellekens (NED); Rosa van Doorn (NED)	Gerrit Rosenkranz (GER); Ceylin del Carmen Alvarado (NED)	Markus Eydt (GER); Fenna Hoegee (NED)	
21 August	Yenice MTB Cup	(Turkey) Yenice	2	Ahmet Akpınar (TUR); Tatyana Geneleva (KAZ)	Abdülkadir Kelleci (TUR); Selcan Bahar Karabal (TUR)	Zeki Kaygısız (TUR)	

=== September ===
Date	Race Name	Location	Class	Winner	Second	Third	Ref
2 September	4X Protour	(Italy) Daolasa	2	Tomáš Slavík (CZE); Caitlin Flavell (NZL)	Noel Niederberger (SUI); Josie McFall (GBR)	Erik Emmrich (GER); Michaela Hájková (CZE)	
2–4 September	iXS Downhill Cup - Bad Tabarz	(Germany) Bad Tabarz	2	Nils Klasen (GER); Katharina Klos (GER)	Lucas Rham (GER); Sabine Vicze (GER)	Frederik Olsen (GER); Roos Op de Beeck (BEL)	
3 September	4X Protour	(Italy) Daolasa	2	Tomáš Slavík (CZE); Louise-Anna Ferguson (GBR)	Erik Emmrich (GER); Josie McFall (GBR)	Roberto Cristofoli (ITA); Caitlin Flavell (NZL)	
3 September	CykloOpawy MTB XCO Głuchołazy	(Poland) Głuchołazy	3	Krzysztof Łukasik (POL); Klaudia Czabok (POL)	Paweł Bernas (POL); Zuzanna Krzystała (POL)	Karol Ostaszewski (POL); Antonina Białek (POL)	
3 September	CST Singletrack MTB Marathon Košice	(Slovakia) Košice	2	András Szatmáry (HUN); Janka Keseg Števková (SVK)	Martin Kostelničák (SVK); Regina Schmidel (HUN)	Márton Blazsó (HUN); Martina Krahulcová (SVK)	
3 September	XII Maraton BTT Sierra de Cazorla	(Spain) Cazorla	2	Víctor Manuel Fernández (ESP); María Díaz Pernía (ESP)	Xavier Calaf García (ESP); Cristina Morán Roza (ESP)	Álvaro Lobato Matías (ESP); Eva Ortega Aguilar (ESP)	
4–10 September	Momentum Medical Scheme Cape Pioneer Trek	(South Africa) Oudtshoorn	S1	Marco Joubert (RSA); Theresa Ralph (RSA)	Pieter du Toit (RSA); Kimberley Le Court (MRI)	Arno du Toit (RSA); Yolande de Villiers (RSA)	
7 September	Taça Brasil de XCO	(Brazil) Rio de Janeiro	2	José Gabriel Marques (BRA); Giuliana Morgen (BRA)	Ulan Galinski (BRA)	Edson Rezende (BRA)	
9–11 September	V Copa Nacional MTB GW-Shimano	(Colombia) Ibagué	2	Juan Fernando Monroy (COL); María José Salamanca (COL)	Fabio Castañeda (COL); Ana María Roa (COL)	Jhonnatan Botero Villegas (COL); Gloria Garzón Melo (COL)	
9–11 September	iXS European Downhill Cup - Pila	(Italy) Pila	1	Onni Rainio (FIN); Veronika Widmann (ITA)	Tristan Botteram (NED); Lisa Baumann (SUI)	Simen Smestad (NOR); Ramona Kupferschmied (SUI)	
10 September	Copa Catalana Internacional BTT #8	(Spain) Vall de Boí	2	Ever Alejandro Gómez (BOL); Núria Bosch (ESP)	Cristofer Bosque Ruano (ESP); Sara Gay (ESP)	Jaume Bosch (ESP); Laura Michelle Kalberg (NED)	
10–11 September	Dalatråkken MTB	(Norway) Brumunddal	1	Viktor Lindquist (SWE) (XCO); Ingrid Bøe Jacobsen (NOR) (XCO); Ole Sigurd Rekdahl (NOR) (XCC); Ingrid Bøe Jacobsen (NOR) (XCC)	Eskil Evensen-Lie (NOR) (XCO); Linn Gustafzzon (SWE) (XCO); Knut Røhme (NOR) (XCC); Linn Gustafzzon (SWE) (XCC)	Ole Sigurd Rekdahl (NOR) (XCO); Elisabeth Sveum (NOR) (XCO); Erik Hægstad (NOR) (XCC); Sara Öberg (SWE) (XCC)	
11 September	25. MTB Cross Country "Rund um den Roadlberg"	(Austria) Ottenschlag im Mühlkreis	2	Bartłomiej Wawak (POL); Laura Stigger (AUT)	Max Foidl (AUT); Jitka Čábelická (CZE)	Gregor Raggl (AUT); Clara Sommer (AUT)	
11 September	Shimano MTB Liga #6 - DMK	(Denmark) Holte	2	Simon Andreassen (DEN); Sofie Heby Pedersen (DEN)	Oliver Sølvhøj (DEN); Viktoria Smidth Knudsen (DEN)	Tobias Lillelund (DEN); Emma Belforth (SWE)	
11 September	La Forestiere - XCM	(France) Les Moussières	HC	Hugo Drechou (FRA); Léna Gérault (FRA)	Simon Schneller (GER); Kataržina Sosna (LTU)	Urs Huber (SUI); Estelle Morel (FRA)	
11 September	Mythos Primiero Dolomiti	(Italy) Primiero San Martino di Castrozza	2	Alexey Medvedev (); Claudia Peretti (ITA)	Andrea Siffredi (ITA); Chiara Burato (ITA)	Nicolas Samparisi (ITA); Costanza Fasolis (ITA)	
14–17 September	Enduro World Series - Crans-Montana - EWS + EWS-E	(Switzerland) Crans-Montana	3	Jack Moir (AUS); Isabeau Courdurier (FRA); Yannick Pontal (FRA) (E-MTB); Sofia Wiedenroth (GER) (E–MTB)	Martin Maes (BEL); Harriet Harnden (GBR); Andrea Garibbo (ITA) (E–MTB); Florencia Espiñeira Herreros (CHI) (E–MTB)	Kevin Miquel (FRA); Morgane Charre (FRA); Antoine Rogge (FRA) (E–MTB); Ines Thoma (GER) (E–MTB)	
16–18 September	MTB Festival	(Brazil) Mairiporã	1	Henrique Avancini (BRA) (XCO); Raiza Goulão (BRA) (XCO); Henrique Avancini (BRA) (XCC); Karen Olímpio (BRA) (XCC)	Gustavo Pereira (BRA) (XCO); Karen Olímpio (BRA) (XCO); José Gabriel Marques (BRA) (XCC); Raiza Goulão (BRA) (XCC)	José Gabriel Marques (BRA) (XCO); Letícia Cândido (BRA) (XCO); Gustavo Pereira (BRA) (XCC); Letícia Cândido (BRA) (XCC)	
16–18 September	Borovets Open Cup	(Bulgaria) Borovets	1	Thomas Guibal (FRA)	Marco Comerio (ITA)	Stivian Gatev (BUL)	
17 September	Hallbyrundan	(Sweden) Jönköping	2	Viktor Lindquist (SWE); Ingrid Bøe Jacobsen (NOR)	Mats Tubaas Glende (NOR); Emma Belforth (SWE)	Oscar Lind (SWE); Sara Öberg (SWE)	
17 September	Kayseri MTB Cup	(Turkey) Kayseri	3	Furkan Akçam (TUR); Alina Sarkulova (KAZ)	Ahmet Akpınar (TUR); Tatyana Geneleva (KAZ)	Abdülkadir Kelleci (TUR)	
17–18 September	76 Indonesian Downhill Seri 1	(Indonesia) Malang	2	Rendy Varera Sanjaya (INA); Millatul Khaqimah (INA)	Andy Prayoga (INA); Ayu Triya Andriana (INA)	Popo Ario Sejati (INA); Nilna Murni Ningtyas (INA)	
18 September	Abierto Argentino de XCO #5	(Argentina) Santa María de Punilla	2	Joel Fernando Contreras (ARG); Agustina Antonella Quirós (ARG)	Agustín Durán (ARG); Inés Gutiérrez (ARG)	Jorge Álvaro Macías (ARG); Francisca Candelaria Chiesa Bachey (ARG)	
18 September	Zanzenbergrennen	(Austria) Dornbirn	1	Lars Forster (SUI); Sina Frei (SUI)	Thomas Litscher (SUI); Laura Stigger (AUT)	Mario Bair (AUT); Tina Züger (SUI)	
18 September	Velka cena Vimperka	(Czech Republic) Vimperk	2	Bartłomiej Wawak (POL); Adéla Holubová (CZE)	Ondřej Cink (CZE); Jitka Čábelická (CZE)	Lukáš Kobes (CZE); Mari-Liis Mõttus (EST)	
18 September	JBG-2 Wiśniowiec MTB XCO Race	(Poland) Rybnik	3	Krzysztof Klimek (POL); Klaudia Czabok (POL)	Michał Topór (POL); Gabriela Wojtyła (POL)	Piotr Kryński (POL); Zuzanna Krzystała (POL)	
18 September	Portugal Cup XCO - Avis International XCO	(Portugal) Avis	1	David Valero (ESP); Rocío del Alba García (ESP)	Ricardo Marinheiro (POR); Joana Monteiro (POR)	Roberto Ferreira (POR); Raquel Queirós (POR)	
18 September	Philippe Wagner Petrovaradin Fortress Bike Fest	(Serbia) Novi Sad	1	Max Foidl (AUT); Alexandra Adam (GRE)	Zsombor Palumby (HUN); Eirini Karousou (GRE)	Andrin Gees (SUI); Dunja Ivanova (MKD)	
18 September	Erciyes MTB Cup	(Turkey) Kayseri	2	Abdülkadir Kelleci (TUR); Alina Sarkulova (KAZ)	Furkan Akçam (TUR); Tatyana Geneleva (KAZ)	Ahmet Akpınar (TUR)	
21–24 September	Bara Epic Israel	(Israel) Galilee	SHC	Georg Egger (GER); Na'ama Noyman (ISR)	Lukas Baum (GER); Lia Schrievers (GER)	Karl Markt (AUT); Sophie von Berswordt (NED)	
22–25 September	Enduro World Series - Loudenvielle	(France) Loudenvielle	3	Alex Rudeau (FRA); Morgane Charre (FRA)	Martin Maes (BEL); Isabeau Courdurier (FRA)	Jack Moir (AUS); Mélanie Pugin (FRA)	
23–25 September	ÖKK Bike Revolution Huttwil	(Switzerland) Huttwil	1	Lars Forster (SUI); Pauline Ferrand-Prévot (FRA)	Nino Schurter (SUI); Alessandra Keller (SUI)	Andri Frischknecht (SUI); Sina Frei (SUI)	
23–25 September	MTB French Cup XCO/XCC	(France) Levens	HC	Jordan Sarrou (FRA) (XCO); Lucie Urruty (FRA) (XCO); Jordan Sarrou (FRA) (XCC); Noémie Garnier (FRA) (XCC)	Pierre de Froidmont (BEL) (XCO); Léna Gérault (FRA) (XCO); Maxime Loret (FRA) (XCC); Léna Gérault (FRA) (XCC)	Antoine Philipp (FRA) (XCO); Yana Belomoyna (UKR) (XCO); Axel Roudil-Cortinat (FRA) (XCC); Isaure Medde (FRA) (XCC)	
24 September	CIMTB Michelin - XCC	(Brazil) Congonhas	3	Luiz Cocuzzi (BRA); Raiza Goulão (BRA)	José Gabriel Marques (BRA); Isabella Lacerda (BRA)	Guilherme Müller (BRA); Karen Olímpio (BRA)	
24 September	MTB Eliminator National Series Turieckap	(Slovakia) Turčianske Teplice	3	Šimon Němec (CZE); Terézia Ciriaková (SVK)	Matúš Mazan (SVK); Radka Paulechová (SVK)	Alex Švec (SVK); Kristína Tichá (SVK)	
24 September	Scott Marathon BTT	(Spain) Girona	1	Hugo Drechou (FRA); Mónica Calderon (COL)	Peeter Pruus (EST); Margot Moschetti (FRA)	Roberto Bou Martín (ESP); Vera Looser (NAM)	
24 September	Miniature Cappadocia MTB Cup	(Turkey) Soğanlı	3	Abdülkadir Kelleci (TUR); Alina Sarkulova (KAZ)	Denis Sergiyenko (KAZ); Tatyana Geneleva (KAZ)	Zeki Kaygısız (TUR)	
24–25 September	ABUS-Ruhrbike-Festival	(Germany) Wetter	2	Maximilian Brandl (GER); Lotte Koopmans (NED)	David List (GER); Githa Michiels (BEL)	Lennart Krayer (GER); Theresia Schwenk (GER)	
24–25 September	Coupe du Japon Misaka International	(Japan) –	3	Riki Kitabayashi (JPN); Yuuka Yabuki (JPN)	Ryo Takeuchi (JPN); Urara Kawaguchi (JPN)	Ari Hirabayashi (JPN); Yelisaveta Topchaniuk (UKR)	
24–25 September	Copa Catalana Internacional BTT #9	(Spain) Girona	1	Victor Koretzky (FRA); Rocío del Alba García (ESP)	Simon Andreassen (DEN); Raquel Queirós (POR)	Jofre Cullell (ESP); Lucía Gómez Andreu (ESP)	
25 September	CIMTB Michelin - XCO	(Brazil) Congonhas	2	José Gabriel Marques (BRA); Raiza Goulão (BRA)	Guilherme Müller (BRA); Karen Olímpio (BRA)	Luiz Cocuzzi (BRA); Hercília Najara (BRA)	
25 September	XCO Predolac	(Croatia) Metković	1	Max Foidl (AUT); Nina Benz (GER)	Alessio Agostinelli (ITA); Lejla Njemčević (BIH)	Silas Graf (GER); Zuzana Šafářová (CZE)	
25 September	V. Kanizsa Kupa	(Hungary) Nagykanizsa	2	Bartłomiej Wawak (POL); Virág Buzsáki (HUN)	Zsombor Palumby (HUN); Regina Schmidel (HUN)	Matěj Průdek (CZE); Csenge Anna Bokros (HUN)	
25 September	21° Gara Internazionale di Mountain Bike Gimondibike	(Italy) Iseo	3	Aleksey Medvedev (); Chiara Teocchi (ITA)	Cristian Cominelli (ITA); Claudia Peretti (ITA)	Jacopo Billi (ITA); Chiara Burato (ITA)	
25 September	Soğanlı MTB Cup	(Turkey) Soğanlı	2	Denis Sergiyenko (KAZ); Alina Sarkulova (KAZ)	Zeki Kaygısız (TUR); Tatyana Geneleva (KAZ)	Furkan Akçam (TUR)	
29 September–2 October	Enduro World Series–Finale Ligure EWS-E	(Italy) Finale Ligure	3	Adrien Dailly (FRA); Florencia Espiñeira (CHI)	Tiago Ladeira (POR); Harriet Harnden (GBR)	Richard Jude Jr. (USA); Tracy Moseley (GBR)	
29 September–2 October	Enduro World Series–Trophy of Nations	(Italy) Finale Ligure	3	New Zealand (NZL); Murray; Walker; Masters	France (FRA); Jeandel; Tordo; Rudeau	United States (USA); Peterson; Nesteroff; Rude Jr.	
30 September	Greek MTB Series–Lesvos Molyvos Race #1	(Greece) Lesbos	2	Dimitrios Antoniadis (GRE); Eleftheria Giachou (GRE)	Amando Martínez (MEX); Varvara Fasoi (GRE)	Charoun Molla (GRE); Alexandra Adam (GRE)	

=== October ===
Date	Race Name	Location	Class	Winner	Second	Third	Ref
1 October	Tierra Estella Epic	(Spain) Ayegui	2	Peeter Pruus (EST); Estíbaliz Sagardoy (ESP)	Sergio Mantecón (ESP); Corina Mesplet (ESP)	Pablo Rodríguez (ESP); Maaris Meier (EST)	
1–2 October	Copa Chile Internacional Petorca	(Chile) Petorca	2	Agustín Durán (ARG); María Castro (CHI)	Patricio Farías (CHI); Evelyn Muñoz (CHI)	Sebastian Miranda (CHI); Pilar Corvalan (CHI)	
1–2 October	Proffix Swiss Bike Cup Gstaad	(Switzerland) Gstaad	1	Vital Albin (SUI); Alessandra Keller (SUI)	Marcel Guerrini (SUI); Noëlle Buri (SUI)	Andri Frischknecht (SUI); Anne Tauber (NED)	
2 October	UCI MTB Marathon Series – Extreme sur loue - XCM	(France) Ornans	SR	Axel Roudil-Cortinat (FRA); Estelle Morel (FRA)	Martin Stošek (CZE); Lejla Njemčević (BIH)	Casey South (SUI); Claudia Peretti (ITA)	
2 October	Greek MTB Series – Lesvos Molyvos Race #2	(Greece) Lesbos	2	Amando Martínez (MEX); Eleftheria Giachou (GRE)	Dimitrios Antoniadis (GRE); Alexandra Adam (GRE)	Charoun Molla (GRE); Eirini Karousou (GRE)	
2 October	Cycling at the 2022 South American Games	(Paraguay) Asunción	2	Gustavo Xavier (BRA); Raiza Goulão (BRA)	José Gabriel Marques (BRA); Agustina María Apaza (ARG)	Fabio Castañeda (COL); Hercília Najara (BRA)	
2 October	Down Urban Barcelona	(Spain) Barcelona	2	Pol Romero Perich (ESP); Mireia Pi (ESP)	Ignasi Jorba (ESP); Elisabeth Guillén (ESP)	Ashley Stockton (GBR)	
5–9 October	Crankworx Cairns	(Australia) Cairns	1	Troy Brosnan (AUS); Tracey Hannah (AUS)	Connor Fearon (AUS); Sian A'Hern (AUS)	Michael Hannah (AUS); Louise-Anna Ferguson (GBR)	
6 October	Greek MTB Series – Sparta MTB Race #1	(Greece) Sparta	2	Tobias Lillelund (DEN); Sofie Pedersen (DEN)	Fabio Püntener (SUI); Tanja Žakelj (SVN)	Nick Bürki (SUI); Emeline Detilleux (BEL)	
7 October	Greek MTB Series – Sparta MTB Race #2	(Greece) Sparta	2	Oliver Sølvhøj (DEN); Sofie Pedersen (DEN)	Simon Andreassen (DEN); Tanja Žakelj (SVN)	Tobias Lillelund (DEN); Ronja Eibl (GER)	
7 October	UCI MTB Marathon Series – Roc D'azur	(France) Fréjus	SR	Hugo Drechou (FRA); Léna Gérault (FRA)	Fabian Rabensteiner (ITA); Estelle Morel (FRA)	Andreas Seewald (GER); Giada Specia (ITA)	
8 October	Greek MTB Series – Sparta MTB Race #3	(Greece) Sparta	3	Jens Schuermans (BEL); Theresia Schwenk (GER)	Nick Bürki (SUI); Emeline Detilleux (BEL)	Leon Kaiser (GER); Na'ama Noyman (ISR)	
8–9 October	Costa Blanca Cup XCO	(Spain) Alicante	2	David Valero (ESP); Rocío del Alba García (ESP)	Cristofer Bosque Ruano (ESP); Alice Pirard (BEL)	Manuel Sánchez Aldeguer (ESP); Elena Lloret (ESP)	
9 October	Greek MTB Series – Sparta MTB Race #4	(Greece) Sparta	1	Tobias Lillelund (DEN); Sofie Pedersen (DEN)	Fabio Püntener (SUI); Tanja Žakelj (SVN)	Oliver Sølvhøj (DEN); Githa Michiels (BEL)	
9 October	XXI Ruta Ciclista BTT Gran Premio Villa de Paterna	(Spain) Paterna del Campo	1	Manuel Cordero (ESP); María Esther Maqueda (ESP)	David González Tirado (ESP); Gloria Galeano (PAR)	Álvaro Lobato Matías (ESP); María Isabel Felipe (ESP)	
13 October	Greek MTB Series – Salamina MTB Race - XCC #1	(Greece) Salamis Island	3	Maximilian Brandl (GER); Theresia Schwenk (GER)	Fabio Püntener (SUI); Githa Michiels (BEL)	Antoine Philipp (FRA); Nina Benz (GER)	
14–16 October	Petrich DHI	(Bulgaria) Petrich	1	Athanasios Panagitsas (GRE)	Rémi Goyau (FRA)	Elliott Lees (GBR)	
15 October	Greek MTB Series – Salamina MTB Race - XCC #2	(Greece) Salamis Island	3	Maximilian Brandl (GER); Anne Tauber (NED)	Simon Andreassen (DEN); Sofie Pedersen (DEN)	Mārtiņš Blūms (LVA); Giada Specia (ITA)	
15 October	Capoliveri Legend Cup's Eleven	(Italy) Capoliveri	HC	Fabian Rabensteiner (ITA); Claudia Peretti (ITA)	Juri Ragnoli (ITA); Stefanie Dohrn (GER)	Diego Arias (COL); Irina Lützelschwab (SUI)	
15–16 October	Copa Bogotana MTB	(Colombia) Bogotá	2	Hilvar Malaver Calderón (COL); Ana María Roa (COL)	Camilo Gómez Gómez (COL); Karen Olímpio (BRA)	Jhonnatan Botero Villegas (COL); Angie Milena Lara (COL)	
15–16 October	Coupe du Japon Kumamoto Yoshimuta International	(Japan) Yoshimuta	3	Toki Sawada (JPN); Yuuka Yabuki (JPN)	Riki Kitabayashi (JPN); Yoko Hashiguchi (JPN)	Ari Hirabayashi (JPN); Maiha Takemura (JPN)	
16 October	Greek MTB Series – Salamina Epic Race #3	(Greece) Salamis Island	1	Simon Andreassen (DEN); Anne Tauber (NED)	Maximilian Brandl (GER); Sofie Pedersen (DEN)	Cameron Orr (GBR); Giada Specia (ITA)	
16 October	Trans Itapua Bike - XCM	(Paraguay) San Juan del Paraná	2	Elvis Felisberto de Miranda (BRA); Verónica Núñez Sanabria (PAR)	Gerardo Martínez Jorgge (PAR); Nancy Brizuela Acevedo (PAR)	Máximo Abel Cristaldo (PAR); Agustina Riveros (PAR)	
16 October	UCI Latramun XXIV SingleTrackMarathon	(Spain) Girona	2	Hugo Drechou (FRA); Meritxell Figueras (ESP)	Francesc Guerra (ESP); Greete Steinburg (EST)	José Dias (POR); Bettina Janas (GER)	
20 October	Greek MTB Series – Salamina Epic Race #4	(Greece) Salamis Island	1	Maximilian Brandl (GER); Giada Specia (ITA)	Gunnar Holmgren (CAN); Sofie Pedersen (DEN)	Lars Forster (SUI); Tanja Žakelj (SVN)	
21 October	Greek MTB Series – Salamina Epic Race #5	(Greece) Salamis Island	1	Maximilian Brandl (GER); Sofie Pedersen (DEN)	David List (GER); Giada Specia (ITA)	Gunnar Holmgren (CAN); Giorgia Marchet (ITA)	
21–23 October	VI Copa Nacional MTB GW-Shimano	(Colombia) Bogotá	2	Hilvar Yamid Malaver Calderón (COL); Ana María Roa (COL)	Juan Fernando Monroy (COL); Karen Olímpio (BRA)	Jhonnatan Botero (COL); Gloria Garzón (COL)	
22–23 October	Copa Chile Internacional Angol	(Chile) Angol	2	Ignacio Gallo (CHI); Catalina Vidaurre (CHI)	Sebastián Miranda (CHI); Pilar Corvalán (CHI)	Sebastián Gesche (CHI)	
22–23 October	Greek MTB Series – Salamina Epic Race #6	(Greece) Salamis Island	HC	Lars Forster (SUI); Giorgia Marchet (ITA)	Simon Andreassen (DEN); Sofie Pedersen (DEN)	Oliver Sølvhøj (DEN); Leonie Daubermann (GER)	
23 October	Buthiers MTB Race	(France) Buthiers	2	Robin Bourdier (FRA); Flavie Guille (FRA)	Clément Cousin (FRA); Élise Poehner (FRA)	Victor Vidal (FRA); Cynthia Rost (FRA)	
23–29 October	Brasil Ride Bahia	(Brazil) Porto Seguro	S1	Henrique Avancini (BRA); Marcella Toldi (BRA)	Tiago Ferreira (POR); Naima Diesner (GER)	Edson Rezende (BRA); Daniela Araújo (BRA)	
28–30 October	Japan Mountain Bike Cup	(Japan) Izu	1	Juri Zanotti (ITA); Anne Terpstra (NED)	Ari Hirabayashi (JPN); Rebecca McConnell (AUS)	Riyadh Hakim Bin Lukman (SIN); Akari Kobayashi (JPN)	
29 October–1 November	Colina Triste	(Spain) Santo Domingo de Silos	S1	Cristofer Bosque Ruano (ESP); Xavier Ariza Garcia (ESP); Greete Steinburg (EST); Janika Lõiv (EST)	Martín Mata Cabello (ESP); Iñigo Gomez Elorriaga (ESP); María del Pilar Fernández (ESP); Jessica Cruz (AND)	Julen Latorre Gulías (ESP); Unai Mateos Garrido (ESP); María Isabel Felipe (ESP); Desireé Moya (ESP)	
30 October	Trikala MTB XCO Race	(Greece) Trikala	3	Dimitrios Antoniadis (GRE); Varvara Fasoi (GRE)	Charoun Molla (GRE); Alexandra Adam (GRE)	Nikolaos Georgiadis (GRE); Eirini Maria Karousou (GRE)	

=== November ===
Date	Race Name	Location	Class	Winner	Second	Third	Ref
6 November	Campeonato Sudamericano de XCM	(Argentina) Chilecito	2	Christian Moyano (ARG); Laura Quiroga (ARG)	Agustín Durán (ARG); Pilar Adoue (ARG)	Germán Dorhmann (ARG); Sabrina Guadalupe Nieva (ARG)	
9–13 November	Crankworx Rotorua Downhill	(New Zealand) Rotorua	1	Samuel Blenkinsop (NZL); Louise-Anna Ferguson (GBR)	Brook Macdonald (NZL); Jenna Hastings (NZL)	Matthew Walker (NZL); Caitlin Flavell (NZL)	
12 November	Campeonato Centroamericano XCC	(Honduras) Tegucigalpa	1	Luis López (HON); Adriana Rojas Cubero (CRC)	Sebastián Brenes (CRC); Milagro Mena (CRC)	Jonathan de León (GUA); Isabella Gómez Meneses (CRC)	
12–13 November	Copa Chile Internacional La Ligua	(Chile) La Ligua	2	Sebastián Miranda (CHI); Catalina Vidaurre (CHI)	Sebastián Gesche (CHI); Pilar Corvalán (CHI)	Eyair Astudillo (CHI); Evelyn Muñoz (CHI)	
13 November	Campeonato Centroamericano XCO	(Honduras) Tegucigalpa	1	Luis López (HON); Milagro Mena (CRC)	Paolo Montoya (CRC); Adriana Rojas Cubero (CRC)	Jonathan de León (GUA); Florinda de León (GUA)	
27 November	Larisa MTB XCO race	(Greece) Larissa	3	Dimitrios Antoniadis (GRE); Panagiota Papargyri (GRE)	Charoun Molla (GRE)	Nikolaos Georgiadis (GRE)	

=== December ===
Date	Race Name	Location	Class	Winner	Second	Third	Ref
2 December	Lahav Forest Race	(Israel) Lahav	2	Eitan Levi (ISR); Naama Noyman (ISR)	Gil Ly Gonen (ISR); Naomi Luria (ISR)	Tomer Zaltsman (ISR); Romi Veldnizki (ISR)	
4 December	French National Championships - Beachrace	(France) Berck	3	Alex Colman (BEL); Laurane Meyers (FRA)	Samuel Leroux (FRA); Émilie Brette (FRA)	Thomas Joseph (BEL)	
10–11 December	76 Indonesian Downhill Seri 2	(Indonesia) Kudus Regency	1	Mohammad Abdul Hakim (INA); Milatul Khaqimah (INA)	Khoiful Mukhib (INA); Nilna Murni Ningtias (INA)	Yoris Sahara (INA); Ananda Nasywa Audrey (INA)	
11 December	European Championships - Beachrace	(France) Dunkirk	3	Coen Vermeltfoort (NED); Tessa Neefjes (NED)	Timothy Dupont (BEL); Nina Kessler (NED)	Samuel Leroux (FRA); Joyce Vanderbeken (BEL)	
23 December	International Shfaram XCO no.2	(Israel) Shefa-Amr	2	Eitan Levi (ISR); Na'ama Noyman (ISR)	Gil Ly Gonen (ISR); Naomi Luria (ISR)	Tomer Zaltsman (ISR); Romi Veldnizki (ISR)	
25–27 December	Arab MTB Championships	(United Arab Emirates) Sharjah	3	Maher Habouria (TUN); Wissal Baoubbou (MAR)	Abderrahmane Mansouri (ALG); Marwa El Hage (LBN)	Hamza Amari (ALG); Maryam Al Zaabi (UAE)	

== Copa de España XCM 2022 ==
=== General classification ===
Men's Elite Standings
Rank	Rider	ESP (Spain)	ESP (Spain)	ESP (Spain)	ESP (Spain)	ESP (Spain)	Total Points
1	(Spain) Raúl Bermúdez	175	140	104	140	128	687
2	(Spain) Álvaro Lobato Matías	128	80	140	112	155	615
3	(Spain) Manuel Cordero Morgado	200	28	200	120	52	600
4	(Spain) Alberto Mingorance	68		96	88	140	392
5	(Spain) José Márquez Granados	104		175	80		359
6	(Spain) Julen Latorre	80	72		200		352
7	(Spain) Javier Busto	64	56		175	56	351
8	(Spain) Sergio Sierra Garrido	20	36	68	104	104	332
9	(Spain) Xavier Calaf	20		128		175	323
10	(Spain) Antonio García Albaladejo	56	68	120	76		320

Women's Elite Standings
Rank	Rider	ESP (Spain)	ESP (Spain)	ESP (Spain)	ESP (Spain)	ESP (Spain)	Total Points
1	(Spain) María Díaz Pernia	175	200		200	200	775
2	(Spain) Cristina Morán Roza		140	200	155	175	670
3	(Spain) Eva Ortega Aguilar	140	120	120	120	155	655
4	(Spain) Marta Ballesteros Liébanes	128	104	155	128	128	643
5	(Spain) Lorena Gil Alarcón			140		120	260
6	(Spain) Anna Pujol	120			140		260
7	(Spain) Mar Delgado	96		128			224
8	(Spain) Natalia Fischer	200					200
9	(Spain) Susana Alonso				175		175
10	(Spain) Almudena Rodríguez			175			175

== 2022 UCI Mountain Bike World Cup ==
=== Downhill ===
Date	Venue	Podium (Men)	Podium (Women)
26–27 March	France; Lourdes	Amaury Pierron (FRA)	Camille Balanche (SUI)
26–27 March	France; Lourdes	Finn Iles (CAN)	Myriam Nicole (FRA)
26–27 March	France; Lourdes	Loïc Bruni (FRA)	Tahnée Seagrave (GBR)
21–22 May	United Kingdom; Fort William	Amaury Pierron (FRA)	Nina Hoffmann (GER)
21–22 May	United Kingdom; Fort William	Thibaut Dapréla (FRA)	Camille Balanche (SUI)
21–22 May	United Kingdom; Fort William	Laurie Greenland (GBR)	Myriam Nicole (FRA)
10 June	Austria; Leogang	Matt Walker (GBR)	Camille Balanche (SUI)
10 June	Austria; Leogang	Danny Hart (GBR)	Myriam Nicole (FRA)
10 June	Austria; Leogang	Ángel Suarez Alonso (ESP)	Eleonora Farina (ITA)
8–9 July	Switzerland; Lenzerheide	Amaury Pierron (FRA)	Myriam Nicole (FRA)
8–9 July	Switzerland; Lenzerheide	Finn Iles (CAN)	Camille Balanche (SUI)
8–9 July	Switzerland; Lenzerheide	Greg Minnaar (RSA)	Eleonora Farina (ITA)
15–16 July	Andorra; Vallnord	Loris Vergier (FRA)	Valentina Höll (AUT)
15–16 July	Andorra; Vallnord	Loïc Bruni (FRA)	Nina Hoffmann (GER)
15–16 July	Andorra; Vallnord	Finn Iles (CAN)	Camille Balanche (SUI)
30–31 July	United States; Snowshoe	Amaury Pierron (FRA)	Camille Balanche (SUI)
30–31 July	United States; Snowshoe	Bernard Kerr (GBR)	Myriam Nicole (FRA)
30–31 July	United States; Snowshoe	Andreas Kolb (AUT)	Nina Hoffmann (GER)
6–7 August	Canada; Mont Sainte-Anne	Finn Iles (CAN)	Valentina Höll (AUT)
6–7 August	Canada; Mont Sainte-Anne	Laurie Greenland (GBR)	Nina Hoffmann (GER)
6–7 August	Canada; Mont Sainte-Anne	Troy Brosnan (AUS)	Eleonora Farina (ITA)
3–4 September	Italy; Val di Sole (Final)	Loris Vergier (FRA)	Myriam Nicole (FRA)
3–4 September	Italy; Val di Sole (Final)	Andreas Kolb (AUT)	Nina Hoffmann (GER)
3–4 September	Italy; Val di Sole (Final)	Dakotah Norton (USA)	Valentina Höll (AUT)

=== XCO ===
Date	Venue	Podium (Men)	Podium (Women)
8–10 April	Brazil; Petrópolis	Nino Schurter (SUI)	Rebecca McConnell (AUS)
8–10 April	Brazil; Petrópolis	Maxime Marotte (FRA)	Anne Terpstra (NED)
8–10 April	Brazil; Petrópolis	Vlad Dascălu (ROU)	Loana Lecomte (FRA)
6–8 May	Germany; Albstadt	Tom Pidcock (GBR)	Rebecca McConnell (AUS)
6–8 May	Germany; Albstadt	Nino Schurter (SUI)	Jenny Rissveds (SWE)
6–8 May	Germany; Albstadt	Vlad Dascălu (ROU)	Mona Mitterwallner (AUT)
13–15 May	Czech Republic; Nové Město na Moravě	Tom Pidcock (GBR)	Rebecca McConnell (AUS)
13–15 May	Czech Republic; Nové Město na Moravě	Vlad Dascălu (ROU)	Loana Lecomte (FRA)
13–15 May	Czech Republic; Nové Město na Moravě	Nino Schurter (SUI)	Jenny Rissveds (SWE)
11 June	Austria; Leogang	Mathias Flückiger (SUI)	Loana Lecomte (FRA)
11 June	Austria; Leogang	Nino Schurter (SUI)	Jenny Rissveds (SWE)
11 June	Austria; Leogang	Alan Hatherly (RSA)	Laura Stigger (AUT)
10 July	Switzerland; Lenzerheide	Luca Braidot (ITA)	Loana Lecomte (FRA)
10 July	Switzerland; Lenzerheide	Alan Hatherly (RSA)	Jenny Rissveds (SWE)
10 July	Switzerland; Lenzerheide	Mathias Flückiger (SUI)	Alessandra Keller (SUI)
17 July	Andorra; Vallnord	Luca Braidot (ITA)	Anne Terpstra (NED)
17 July	Andorra; Vallnord	David Valero (ESP)	Mona Mitterwallner (AUT)
17 July	Andorra; Vallnord	Nino Schurter (SUI)	Ramona Forchini (SUI)
31 July	United States; Snowshoe	David Valero (ESP)	Alessandra Keller (SUI)
31 July	United States; Snowshoe	Titouan Carod (FRA)	Jenny Rissveds (SWE)
31 July	United States; Snowshoe	Luca Braidot (ITA)	Anne Terpstra (NED)
7 August	Canada; Mont Sainte-Anne	Titouan Carod (FRA)	Jolanda Neff (SUI)
7 August	Canada; Mont Sainte-Anne	Filippo Colombo (SUI)	Mona Mitterwallner (AUT)
7 August	Canada; Mont Sainte-Anne	David Valero (ESP)	Haley Batten (USA)
4 September	Italy; Val di Sole (Final)	Titouan Carod (FRA)	Pauline Ferrand-Prévot (FRA)
4 September	Italy; Val di Sole (Final)	Nino Schurter (SUI)	Loana Lecomte (FRA)
4 September	Italy; Val di Sole (Final)	Jordan Sarrou (FRA)	Jolanda Neff (SUI)

=== XCC ===
Date	Venue	Podium (Men)	Podium (Women)
8–10 April	Brazil; Petrópolis	Alan Hatherly (RSA)	Pauline Ferrand-Prévot (FRA)
8–10 April	Brazil; Petrópolis	Thomas Litscher (SUI)	Laura Stigger (AUT)
8–10 April	Brazil; Petrópolis	Maxime Marotte (FRA)	Evie Richards (GBR)
6–8 May	Germany; Albstadt	Samuel Gaze (NZL)	Rebecca McConnell (AUS)
6–8 May	Germany; Albstadt	Jordan Sarrou (FRA)	Pauline Ferrand-Prévot (FRA)
6–8 May	Germany; Albstadt	Nino Schurter (SUI)	Jenny Rissveds (SWE)
13–15 May	Czech Republic; Nové Město na Moravě	Luca Schwarzbauer (GER)	Jolanda Neff (SUI)
13–15 May	Czech Republic; Nové Město na Moravě	Tom Pidcock (GBR)	Rebecca McConnell (AUS)
13–15 May	Czech Republic; Nové Město na Moravě	Filippo Colombo (SUI)	Jenny Rissveds (SWE)
11 June	Austria; Leogang	Mathias Flückiger (SUI)	Loana Lecomte (FRA)
11 June	Austria; Leogang	Vlad Dascălu (ROU)	Anne Terpstra (NED)
11 June	Austria; Leogang	Vital Albin (SUI)	Caroline Bohé (DEN)
8 July	Switzerland; Lenzerheide	Filippo Colombo (SUI)	Jenny Rissveds (SWE)
8 July	Switzerland; Lenzerheide	Mathias Flückiger (SUI)	Alessandra Keller (SUI)
8 July	Switzerland; Lenzerheide	Alan Hatherly (RSA)	Jolanda Neff (SUI)
15 July	Andorra; Vallnord	Mathias Flückiger (SUI)	Alessandra Keller (SUI)
15 July	Andorra; Vallnord	Alan Hatherly (RSA)	Anne Terpstra (NED)
15 July	Andorra; Vallnord	Vlad Dascălu (ROU)	Rebecca McConnell (AUS)
29 July	United States; Snowshoe	Christopher Blevins (USA)	Gwendalyn Gibson (USA)
29 July	United States; Snowshoe	Vlad Dascălu (ROU)	Anne Terpstra (NED)
29 July	United States; Snowshoe	Luca Braidot (ITA)	Jenny Rissveds (SWE)
5 August	Canada; Mont Sainte-Anne	Filippo Colombo (SUI)	Jolanda Neff (SUI)
5 August	Canada; Mont Sainte-Anne	Gerardo Ulloa (MEX)	Gwendalyn Gibson (USA)
5 August	Canada; Mont Sainte-Anne	Sebastian Fini Carstensen (DEN)	Alessandra Keller (SUI)
2 September	Italy; Val di Sole (Final)	Titouan Carod (FRA)	Pauline Ferrand-Prévot (FRA)
2 September	Italy; Val di Sole (Final)	Alan Hatherly (RSA)	Loana Lecomte (FRA)
2 September	Italy; Val di Sole (Final)	Luca Braidot (ITA)	Alessandra Keller (SUI)

=== E-MTB ===
Date	Venue	Podium (Men)	Podium (Women)
23 April	Monaco	Jérôme Gilloux (FRA)	Sofia Wiedenroth (GER)
23 April	Monaco	Hugo Pigeon (FRA)	Nathalie Schneitter (SUI)
23 April	Monaco	Emeric Ienzer (FRA)	Nicole Göldi (SUI)
24 April	Monaco	Jérôme Gilloux (FRA)	Justine Tonso (FRA)
24 April	Monaco	Hugo Pigeon (FRA)	Nathalie Schneitter (SUI)
24 April	Monaco	Joris Ryf (SUI)	Nicole Göldi (SUI)
28 May	(Italy) Monghidoro	Jérôme Gilloux (FRA)	Nicole Göldi (SUI)
28 May	(Italy) Monghidoro	Joris Ryf (SUI)	Sofia Wiedenroth (GER)
28 May	(Italy) Monghidoro	Martino Fruet (ITA)	Anna Oberparleiter (ITA)
29 May	(Italy) Monghidoro	Jérôme Gilloux (FRA)	Justine Tonso (FRA)
29 May	(Italy) Monghidoro	Loïc Noël (SUI)	Nathalie Schneitter (SUI)
29 May	(Italy) Monghidoro	Théo Charmes (FRA)	Sofia Wiedenroth (GER)
23 July	(France) Charade/Clermont-Ferrand	Joris Ryf (SUI)	Nicole Göldi (SUI)
23 July	(France) Charade/Clermont-Ferrand	Hugo Pigeon (FRA)	Justine Tonso (FRA)
23 July	(France) Charade/Clermont-Ferrand	Fabio Spena (SUI)	Laura Charles (FRA)
24 July	(France) Charade/Clermont-Ferrand	Jérôme Gilloux (FRA)	Nicole Göldi (SUI)
24 July	(France) Charade/Clermont-Ferrand	Joris Ryf (SUI)	Nathalie Schneitter (SUI)
24 July	(France) Charade/Clermont-Ferrand	Fabio Spena (SUI)	Justine Tonso (FRA)
3 September	(Belgium) Spa-Francorchamps	Jérôme Gilloux (FRA)	Nicole Göldi (SUI)
3 September	(Belgium) Spa-Francorchamps	Joris Ryf (SUI)	Sofia Wiedenroth (GER)
3 September	(Belgium) Spa-Francorchamps	Ismael Esteban Agüero (ESP)	Justine Tonso (FRA)
4 September	(Belgium) Spa-Francorchamps	Jérôme Gilloux (FRA)	Nicole Göldi (SUI)
4 September	(Belgium) Spa-Francorchamps	Joris Ryf (SUI)	Sofia Wiedenroth (GER)
4 September	(Belgium) Spa-Francorchamps	Kjell van den Boogert (BEL)	Justine Tonso (FRA)
23 September	(Spain) Girona	Jérôme Gilloux (FRA)	Nicole Göldi (SUI)
23 September	(Spain) Girona	Alberto Mingorance (ESP)	Sofia Wiedenroth (GER)
23 September	(Spain) Girona	Ismael Esteban Agüero (ESP)	Sandra Santanyes Murillo (ESP)
24 September	(Spain) Girona	Joris Ryf (SUI)	Nicole Göldi (SUI)
24 September	(Spain) Girona	Jérôme Gilloux (FRA)	Sofia Wiedenroth (GER)
24 September	(Spain) Girona	Ismael Esteban Agüero (ESP)	Sandra Santanyes Murillo (ESP)
15 October	(Spain) Barcelona	Joris Ryf (SUI)	Sofia Wiedenroth (GER)
15 October	(Spain) Barcelona	Ismael Esteban Agüero (ESP)	Kathrin Stirnemann (SUI)
15 October	(Spain) Barcelona	Fabio Spena (SUI)	Justine Tonso (FRA)

=== XCE ===
Date	Venue	Podium (Men)	Podium (Women)
23 April	United Arab Emirates	Titouan Perrin-Ganier (FRA)	Marcela Lima (BRA)
23 April	United Arab Emirates	Daniel Noyola (MEX)	Didi de Vries (NED)
23 April	United Arab Emirates	Killian Demangeon (FRA)	Marion Fromberger (GER)
5 June	(Belgium) Leuven	Simon Gegenheimer (GER)	Gaia Tormena (ITA)
5 June	(Belgium) Leuven	Lukas Malezsewski (BEL)	Ella Holmegård (SWE)
5 June	(Belgium) Leuven	Zinni Van Looy (BEL)	Didi de Vries (NED)
17 June	(Sweden) Falun	Simon Gegenheimer (GER)	Gaia Tormena (ITA)
17 June	(Sweden) Falun	Lukas Malezsewski (BEL)	Jenny Rissveds (SWE)
17 June	(Sweden) Falun	Casper Casserstedt (SWE)	Marion Fromberger (GER)
23 July	(Germany) Aalen	Simon Gegenheimer (GER)	Gaia Tormena (ITA)
23 July	(Germany) Aalen	Titouan Perrin-Ganier (FRA)	Lia Schrievers (GER)
23 July	(Germany) Aalen	Quentin Schrotzenberger (FRA)	Coline Clauzure (FRA)
14 August	(Belgium) Oudenaarde	Simon Gegenheimer (GER)	Gaia Tormena (ITA)
14 August	(Belgium) Oudenaarde	Titouan Perrin-Ganier (FRA)	Marion Fromberger (GER)
14 August	(Belgium) Oudenaarde	Theo Hauser (AUT)	Ella Holmegård (SWE)
21 August	(Turkey) Sakarya Province	Titouan Perrin-Ganier (FRA)	Gaia Tormena (ITA)
21 August	(Turkey) Sakarya Province	Edvin Lindh (SWE)	Marion Fromberger (GER)
21 August	(Turkey) Sakarya Province	Theo Hauser (AUT)	Marcela Lima (BRA)
28 August	(Indonesia) Palangka Raya	Quentin Schrotzenberger (FRA)	Marion Fromberger (GER)
28 August	(Indonesia) Palangka Raya	Simon Gegenheimer (GER)	Warinthorn Phetpraphan (THA)
28 August	(Indonesia) Palangka Raya	Methasit Boonsane (THA)	Ayu Triya Andriyana (INA)
4 September	(India) Leh	Felix Klausmann (GER)	Marion Fromberger (GER)
4 September	(India) Leh	Erick Fierro (ECU)	Mariske Strauss (RSA)
4 September	(India) Leh	Daniel Noyola (MEX)	Marcela Lima (BRA)
10 September	(France) Paris	Felix Klausmann (GER)	Gaia Tormena (ITA)
10 September	(France) Paris	Titouan Perrin-Ganier (FRA)	Coline Clauzure (FRA)
10 September	(France) Paris	Hugo Boulanger (FRA)	Noémie Garnier (FRA)
18 September	(Germany) Winterberg	Simon Gegenheimer (GER)	Coline Clauzure (FRA)
18 September	(Germany) Winterberg	Titouan Perrin-Ganier (FRA)	Margaux Borrelly (FRA)
18 September	(Germany) Winterberg	Felix Klausmann (GER)	Flavie Guille (FRA)

== 2022 UCI Mountain Bike World Championships ==
=== Cross–Country Olympic (XCO) ===
Date	Venue	Podium (Men)	Podium (Women)
24–28 August	France; Les Gets	(Switzerland) Nino Schurter	(France) Pauline Ferrand-Prévot
24–28 August	France; Les Gets	(Spain) David Valero	(Switzerland) Jolanda Neff
24–28 August	France; Les Gets	(Italy) Luca Braidot	(United States) Haley Batten

=== Cross–Country Olympic Short Circuit (XCC) ===
Date	Venue	Podium (Men)	Podium (Women)
24–28 August	France; Les Gets	(New Zealand) Samuel Gaze	(France) Pauline Ferrand-Prévot
24–28 August	France; Les Gets	(Switzerland) Filippo Colombo	(Switzerland) Alessandra Keller
24–28 August	France; Les Gets	(Switzerland) Thomas Litscher	(United States) Gwendalyn Gibson

=== E–MTB Cross–Country ===
Date	Venue	Podium (Men)	Podium (Women)
24–28 August	France; Les Gets	(France) Jérôme Gilloux	(Switzerland) Nicole Göldi
24–28 August	France; Les Gets	(France) Hugo Pigeon	(France) Justine Tonso
24–28 August	France; Les Gets	(Switzerland) Joris Ryf	(Switzerland) Nathalie Schneitter

=== Cross–Country Olympic (XCO) U23 ===
Date	Venue	Podium (Men)	Podium (Women)
24–28 August	France; Les Gets	(Italy) Simone Avondetto	(France) Line Burquier
24–28 August	France; Les Gets	(France) Mathis Azzaro	(Netherlands) Puck Pieterse
24–28 August	France; Les Gets	(Switzerland) Luca Schätti	(Denmark) Sofie Heby Pedersen

=== Cross–Country Olympic (XCO) Junior ===
Date	Venue	Podium (Men)	Podium (Women)
24–28 August	France; Les Gets	(Germany) Paul Schehl	(Switzerland) Monique Halter
24–28 August	France; Les Gets	(Switzerland) Jan Christen	(Switzerland) Lea Huber
24–28 August	France; Les Gets	(France) Paul Magnier	(Poland) Natalia Grzegorzewska

=== Downhill (DHI) ===
Date	Venue	Podium (Men)	Podium (Women)
24–28 August	France; Les Gets	(France) Loïc Bruni	(Austria) Valentina Höll
24–28 August	France; Les Gets	(France) Amaury Pierron	(Germany) Nina Hoffmann
24–28 August	France; Les Gets	(France) Loris Vergier	(France) Myriam Nicole

=== Downhill (DHI) Junior ===
Date	Venue	Podium (Men)	Podium (Women)
24–28 August	France; Les Gets	(United Kingdom) Jordan Williams	(New Zealand) Jenna Hastings
24–28 August	France; Les Gets	(Australia) Remy Meier-Smith	(Canada) Gracey Hemstreet
24–28 August	France; Les Gets	(Italy) Davide Cappello	(Colombia) Valentina Roa

=== Cross–Country Team Relay (XCR) ===
Date	Venue	Podium
24–28 August	France; Les Gets	Switzerland (SUI); Dario Lillo; Khalid Sidahmed; Ramona Forchini; Ronja Blöchlinger; Anina Hutter; Nino Schurter
24–28 August	France; Les Gets	Italy (ITA); Luca Braidot; Marco Betteo; Martina Berta; Valentina Corvi; Giada Specia; Simone Avondetto
24–28 August	France; Les Gets	United States (USA); Christopher Blevins; Cayden Parker; Madigan Munro; Bailey Cioppa; Haley Batten; Riley Amos

== 2022 UCI Mountain Bike Marathon World Championships ==
Date	Venue	Podium (Men)	Podium (Women)
17 September	Denmark; Haderslev	(New Zealand) Samuel Gaze	(France) Pauline Ferrand-Prévot
17 September	Denmark; Haderslev	(Germany) Andreas Seewald	(United Kingdom) Annie Last
17 September	Denmark; Haderslev	(Denmark) Simon Andreassen	(Switzerland) Jolanda Neff

== 2022 UCI Mountain Bike Eliminator World Championships ==
Date	Venue	Podium (Men)	Podium (Women)
2 October	Spain; Barcelona	(France) Titouan Perrin-Ganier	(Italy) Gaia Tormena
2 October	Spain; Barcelona	(Germany) Simon Gegenheimer	(France) Coline Clauzure
2 October	Spain; Barcelona	(Puerto Rico) Ricky Morales	(Sweden) Ella Holmegård

== 2022 UCI Pump Track World Championships ==
Date	Venue	Podium (Men)	Podium (Women)
15–19 November 2022	Chile; Santiago	(Netherlands) Niels Bensink	(Switzerland) Christa von Niederhäusern
15–19 November 2022	Chile; Santiago	(United States) Alec Bob	(Czech Republic) Sabina Košárková
15–19 November 2022	Chile; Santiago	(France) Thibault Dupont	(Latvia) Vineta Pētersone

== Continental Championships ==
=== Asian Continental Championships ===
==== XCO ====
Date	Venue	Podium (Men)	Podium (Women)
19–23 October	South Korea; Suncheon	Riki Kitabayashi (JPN)	Li Hongfeng (CHN)
19–23 October	South Korea; Suncheon	Mino Kim (KOR)	Ma Caixia (CHN)
19–23 October	South Korea; Suncheon	Zaenal Fanani (INA)	Alina Sarkulova (KAZ)

==== DHI ====
Date	Venue	Podium (Men)	Podium (Women)
19–23 October	South Korea; Suncheon	Sheng Shan Chiang (TPE)	Vipavee Deekaballes (THA)
19–23 October	South Korea; Suncheon	Methasit Boonsane (THA)	Tida Panyawan (THA)
19–23 October	South Korea; Suncheon	Yuki Kushima (JPN)	Pei Ni Chou (TPE)

==== XCE ====
Date	Venue	Podium (Men)	Podium (Women)
19–23 October	South Korea; Suncheon	Phunsiri Sirimongkhon (THA)	Alina Sarkulova (KAZ)
19–23 October	South Korea; Suncheon	Zaenal Fanani (INA)	Violetta Kazakova (KAZ)
19–23 October	South Korea; Suncheon	Ihza Muhammad (INA)	Warinthorn Phetpraphan (THA)

==== XCR ====
Date	Venue	Podium
19–23 October	South Korea; Suncheon	Kazakhstan (KAZ); Denis Sergiyenko; Alexey Fefelov; Yegor Karassyov; Alina Sarkulova; Temirlan Mukhamediyanov
19–23 October	South Korea; Suncheon	Japan (JPN); Riki Kitabayashi; Sho Takahashi; Koutarou Murakami; Asahi Miyazu; Akari Kobayashi
19–23 October	South Korea; Suncheon	Malaysia (MAS); Ahmad Syazrin Awang Ilah; Zulfikri Zulkifli; Muhammad Fahmi Khairul; Muhammad Syawal Mazlin; Nur Assyira Zainal Abidin

=== American Continental Championships ===
==== Downhill ====
Date	Venue	Podium (Men)	Podium (Women)
19–20 February	Costa Rica; San José	(United States) Neko Mulally	(El Salvador) Mariana Salazar
19–20 February	Costa Rica; San José	(Canada) Magnus Manson	(Canada) Rachel Pageau
19–20 February	Costa Rica; San José	(United States) Tyler Ervin	(Honduras) María José Montoya

==== XCO ====
Date	Venue	Podium (Men)	Podium (Women)
26 – 29 May	Argentina; San Fernando del Valle de Catamarca	(Brazil) Henrique Avancini	(Mexico) Daniela Campuzano
26 – 29 May	Argentina; San Fernando del Valle de Catamarca	(Mexico) Gerardo Ulloa	(Argentina) Agustina Maria Apaza
26 – 29 May	Argentina; San Fernando del Valle de Catamarca	(Argentina) Joel Fernando Contreras	(United States) Kelsey Urban

==== XCE ====
Date	Venue	Podium (Men)	Podium (Women)
26 – 29 May	Argentina; San Fernando del Valle de Catamarca	(Venezuela) Sandro Muñoz Maneiro	(Brazil) Aline Simões
26 – 29 May	Argentina; San Fernando del Valle de Catamarca	(Argentina) Agustín Córdoba	(Ecuador) Michela Molina Arizaga
26 – 29 May	Argentina; San Fernando del Valle de Catamarca	(Mexico) Daniel Noyola	(Brazil) Marcela Lima

==== XCC ====
Date	Venue	Podium (Men)	Podium (Women)
26 – 29 May	Argentina; San Fernando del Valle de Catamarca	(Mexico) Gerardo Ulloa	(Mexico) Daniela Campuzano
26 – 29 May	Argentina; San Fernando del Valle de Catamarca	(Brazil) Henrique Avancini	(United States) Kelsey Urban
26 – 29 May	Argentina; San Fernando del Valle de Catamarca	(Chile) Martín Vidaurre	(Brazil) Raiza Goulão

==== XCM ====
Date	Venue	Podium (Men)	Podium (Women)
9 – 11 September	Brazil; Conceição do Mato Dentro	(Colombia) Bernardo Suaza	(Brazil) Karen Olímpio
9 – 11 September	Brazil; Conceição do Mato Dentro	(Brazil) Sherman Trezza de Paiva	(Brazil) Isabella Lacerda
9 – 11 September	Brazil; Conceição do Mato Dentro	(Brazil) Guilherme Müller	(Ecuador) Mikela Molina

==== Enduro ====
Date	Venue	Podium (Men)	Podium (Women)
19–20 November	Dominican Republic; Constanza	(Dominican Republic) André Valerio Ortega	(Chile) Paula Jara Bianchi
19–20 November	Dominican Republic; Constanza	(United States) Steve Estabrook	(Dominican Republic) Gabriela Tejada
19–20 November	Dominican Republic; Constanza	(Venezuela) Santiago Martínez Jayo	(Dominican Republic) Grissel Anibelka Vásquez De La Cruz

==== XCR ====
Date	Venue	Podium
26 – 29 May	Argentina; San Fernando del Valle de Catamarca	Mexico (MEX); Gerardo Ulloa; David Elías Rico; Ángel Barrón; Daniela Campuzano; Andrea Cerda Ornelas; Fátima Anahí Hijar
26 – 29 May	Argentina; San Fernando del Valle de Catamarca	Brazil (BRA); José Gabriel; Lázaro Moreira; Alex Malacarne; Letícia Cândido; Luiza Cocuzzi; Marcela Lima
26 – 29 May	Argentina; San Fernando del Valle de Catamarca	Chile (CHI); Nicolás Delich; Cristopher Yaiba; Martín Vidaurre; María Castro; Amalia Medina; Catalina Vidaurre

=== African Continental Championships ===
==== XCO ====
Date	Venue	Podium (Men)	Podium (Women)
22–23 April	Namibia; Windhoek	(Namibia) Alex Miller	(South Africa) Mariske Strauss
22–23 April	Namibia; Windhoek	(South Africa) Philip Buys	(South Africa) Candice Lill
22–23 April	Namibia; Windhoek	(South Africa) Luke Moir	(Mauritius) Kimberley Le Court

=== 2022 European Mountain Bike Championships ===
==== XCO ====
Date	Venue	Podium (Men)	Podium (Women)
19–20 August	Germany; Munich	(United Kingdom) Tom Pidcock	(France) Loana Lecomte
19–20 August	Germany; Munich	(Denmark) Sebastian Fini Carstensen	(France) Pauline Ferrand-Prévot
19–20 August	Germany; Munich	(Switzerland) Filippo Colombo	(Netherlands) Anne Terpstra

==== XCC ====
Date	Venue	Podium (Men)	Podium (Women)
30 June	Portugal; Anadia	(United Kingdom) Charlie Aldridge	(Switzerland) Ronja Blöchlinger
30 June	Portugal; Anadia	(Spain) David Domingo Campos	(Italy) Giorgia Marchet
30 June	Portugal; Anadia	(Switzerland) Alexandre Balmer	(Sweden) Linn Gustafzzon

==== XCE ====
Date	Venue	Podium (Men)	Podium (Women)
1 July	Portugal; Anadia	(Slovenia) Jakob Klemenčič	(Italy) Gaia Tormena
1 July	Portugal; Anadia	(Portugal) Ricardo Marinheiro	(Slovakia) Terézia Ciriaková
1 July	Portugal; Anadia	(Romania) Ede–Károly Molnár	(Czech Republic) Zuzana Šafářová

==== XCM ====
Date	Venue	Podium (Men)	Podium (Women)
19 June	Czech Republic; Jablonné v Podještědí	(Italy) Fabian Rabensteiner	(Spain) Natalia Fischer
19 June	Czech Republic; Jablonné v Podještědí	(Poland) Krzysztof Łukasik	(Switzerland) Janina Wüst
19 June	Czech Republic; Jablonné v Podještědí	(Czech Republic) Jaroslav Kulhavý	(Italy) Claudia Peretti

==== XCR ====
Date	Venue	Podium
30 June	Portugal; Anadia	Netherlands (NED); Tom Schellekens; Rens Teunissen van Manen; Fem van Empel; Lauren Molengraaf; Puck Pieterse; David Haverdings
30 June	Portugal; Anadia	Italy (ITA); Marco Betteo; Fabio Bassignana; Giorgia Marchet; Valentina Corvi; Giada Specia; Simone Avondetto
30 June	Portugal; Anadia	Germany (GER); Paul Schehl; Lennart-Jan Krayer; Finja Lipp; Sina Thiel; Antonia Weeger; Leon Kaiser

==== DHI ====
Date	Venue	Podium (Men)	Podium (Women)
23–25 June	Slovenia; Maribor	Andreas Kolb (AUT)	Monika Hrastnik (SVN)
23–25 June	Slovenia; Maribor	David Trummer (AUT)	Camille Balanche (SUI)
23–25 June	Slovenia; Maribor	Benoît Coulanges (FRA)	Veronika Widmann (ITA)

=== Oceania Continental Championships ===
==== XCO ====
Date	Venue	Podium (Men)	Podium (Women)
27 March	Australia; Brisbane	(New Zealand) Anton Cooper	(Australia) Rebecca McConnell
27 March	Australia; Brisbane	(Australia) Daniel McConnell	(Australia) Zoe Cuthbert
27 March	Australia; Brisbane	(New Zealand) Ben Oliver	(Australia) Katherine Hosking

==== Downhill ====
Date	Venue	Podium (Men)	Podium (Women)
19–20 March	Australia; Gold Coast	(Australia) Hayden Stead	(Australia) Ellie Smith
19–20 March	Australia; Gold Coast	(Australia) Jackson Frew	(Australia) Sian A'Hern
19–20 March	Australia; Gold Coast	(Australia) Joshua Arcus	(Australia) Jessica Hoskin

== National Championships ==
=== XCO ===
Date	Venue	Podium (Men)	Podium (Women)
16 February	Australia; Maydena	Matthew Dinham	Rebecca McConnell
16 February	Australia; Maydena	Daniel McConnell	Zoe Cuthbert
16 February	Australia; Maydena	Cameron Ivory	Holly Harris
26 February	New Zealand; Christchurch	Anton Cooper	Sammie Maxwell
26 February	New Zealand; Christchurch	Ben Oliver	Mary Gray
26 February	New Zealand; Christchurch	Craig Oliver	Amélie MacKay
26 February	Thailand; Sisaket	Keerati Sukprasart	Warinthorn Phetpraphan
26 February	Thailand; Sisaket	Apisit Charoenkit	Supaksorn Nuntana
26 February	Thailand; Sisaket	Suphawich Somsin	Bronze medal
5–6 March	Malaysia; Putrajaya	Ahmad Syazrin Awang Ilah	Nur Assyira Zainal Abidin
5–6 March	Malaysia; Putrajaya	Muaz Abd Rahim	Natahsya Soon
5–6 March	Malaysia; Putrajaya	Muhammad Aidil Taufid Afendi	Nur Deena Safia Nor Effandy
25 March	Qatar; Sealine	Nayef Al Mesallam	Sheikha Al-Suwaidi
25 March	Qatar; Sealine	Abdullah Al Jaaidi	Silver medal
25 March	Qatar; Sealine	Marwan Al Jalham	Bronze medal
3 April	Bermuda; Warwick Parish	Robin Horsfield	Cassandra McPhee
3 April	Bermuda; Warwick Parish	Chris Nusum	Ashley Robinson
3 April	Bermuda; Warwick Parish	Mcquinn Burch	Jennifer Lightbourne
23–24 April	Bolivia; Santa Cruz de la Sierra	Ever Alejandro Gómez	Sonia Quiroga
23–24 April	Bolivia; Santa Cruz de la Sierra	David Rojas Almanza	Miriam Muñoz
23–24 April	Bolivia; Santa Cruz de la Sierra	Miguel Armando Jerez	María Inés Burgos
4 June	Israel; Shefa-Amr	Shlomi Haimy	Na'ama Noyman
4 June	Israel; Shefa-Amr	Yotam Deshe	Naomi Luria
4 June	Israel; Shefa-Amr	Gil Ly Gonen	Romi Vladnitski
4 June	Liechtenstein; Leysin (Switzerland)	Gold medal	Gold medal
4 June	Liechtenstein; Leysin (Switzerland)	Silver medal	Silver medal
4 June	Liechtenstein; Leysin (Switzerland)	Bronze medal	Bronze medal
4 June	Singapore; Singapore	Riyadh Hakim Lukman	Tsalina Phang
4 June	Singapore; Singapore	Farouk Effendy Bujang	Silver medal
4 June	Singapore; Singapore	Junaidy Salleh	Bronze medal
5 June	Puerto Rico; Salinas	Jacob Morales Ortega	Suheily Rodriguez Cruz
5 June	Puerto Rico; Salinas	Ricky Morales	Annelly Oviedo Vázquez
5 June	Puerto Rico; Salinas	Georwill Pérez Román	Xiomara Rivera
5 June	Switzerland; Leysin	Mathias Flückiger	Alessandra Keller
5 June	Switzerland; Leysin	Vital Albin	Linda Indergand
5 June	Switzerland; Leysin	Andri Frischknecht	Sina Frei
11–12 June	Philippines; Danao	Jericho Rivera	Nicole Quiñones
11–12 June	Philippines; Danao	Ej Flores	Ariana Evangelista
11–12 June	Philippines; Danao	Mark Lowel Valderama	Paula Yaoyao
17–19 June 2022	Andorra; Vallnord	Kilian Folguera	Gold medal
17–19 June 2022	Andorra; Vallnord	Stefan Ancion Havet	Silver medal
17–19 June 2022	Andorra; Vallnord	Xavier Jové Riart	Bronze medal
18–19 June	Germany; Bad Salzdetfurth	Maximilian Brandl	Leonie Daubermann
18–19 June	Germany; Bad Salzdetfurth	Luca Schwarzbauer	Lia Schrievers
18–19 June	Germany; Bad Salzdetfurth	Niklas Schehl	Nadine Rieder
19 June	Romania; Cluj-Napoca	Vlad Dascălu	Manuela Mureșan
19 June	Romania; Cluj-Napoca	Roberto-Dumitru Burţa	Salomé Bondor
19 June	Romania; Cluj-Napoca	Ede Molnár	Suzanne Hilbert
19 June	Cyprus; Troodos	Christos Philokyprou	Styliana Kamilari
19 June	Cyprus; Troodos	Stavros Theophanous	Elina Polydorou
19 June	Cyprus; Troodos	Constantinos Thymides	Bronze medal
20 June	Norway; Lillehammer	Emil Eid	Ingrid Bøe Jacobsen
20 June	Norway; Lillehammer	Mats Tubaas Glende	Hedda Brenningen Bjørklund
20 June	Norway; Lillehammer	Ole Sigurd Rekdahl	Thea Siggerud
24–26 June	Argentina; Santa María	Catriel Soto	Inés Gutiérrez
24–26 June	Argentina; Santa María	Fernando Contreras	Florencia De La Porte
24–26 June	Argentina; Santa María	Joaquín Plomer	Agustina Quirós
25–26 June	Denmark; Rold Skov, Himmerland	Sebastian Fini Carstensen	Caroline Bohé
25–26 June	Denmark; Rold Skov, Himmerland	Tobias Lillelund	Sofie Heby Pedersen
25–26 June	Denmark; Rold Skov, Himmerland	Jonas Lindberg	Malene Degn
25–26 June	Honduras; Tegucigalpa	Luis López	Gissel Andino
25–26 June	Honduras; Tegucigalpa	Pablo Cruz	Karen Canales
25–26 June	Honduras; Tegucigalpa	Cristhian Martínez	Karen Elisa Amaya
26 June	Hong Kong	Long Lee Yat	Ching Kiu Law
26 June	Hong Kong	Chung Ho Ting Dicky	Yan Ting Quaada Leung
26 June	Hong Kong	Man Siu Leung	Heidi Yu Hoi Tik
26 June	(Slovenia) Maribor	Žagar Kranjec	Tanja Žakelj
26 June	(Slovenia) Maribor	Jakob Klemenčič	Vita Movrin
26 June	(Slovenia) Maribor	Gregor Krajnc	Maruša Knap
2 July	South Africa; Bloemfontein	Philip Buys	Candice Lill
2 July	South Africa; Bloemfontein	Matthew Beers	Mariske Strauss
2 July	South Africa; Bloemfontein	Wessel Botha	Amy Wakefield
2 July	Peru; Lima	Alexander Urbina Quispe	Mariana Rojas
2 July	Peru; Lima	Frank Balcón Jeri	Roció Cerna Aguilar
2 July	Peru; Lima	Frank Farfán Palomino	Pamela Pachas
3 July	France; Plœuc-l'Hermitage	Titouan Carod	Loana Lecomte
3 July	France; Plœuc-l'Hermitage	Jordan Sarrou	Pauline Ferrand-Prévot
3 July	France; Plœuc-l'Hermitage	Thomas Griot	Line Burquier
10 July	Costa Rica; Cartago	Joseph Ramirez	Adriana Rojas
10 July	Costa Rica; Cartago	Paolo Montoya	Daniela Madriz
10 July	Costa Rica; Cartago	Andrey Fonseca	Isabella Gómez
15 July	Ecuador; Loja	William Tobay Mogrovejo	Miryam Núñez
15 July	Ecuador; Loja	Alejandro Machuca	Mikela Molina
15 July	Ecuador; Loja	Christian Cavinagua	Jhoanna Córdova Terneus
17 July	Paraguay; Asunción	Lucas Bogado	Sara Maria Torres
17 July	Paraguay; Asunción	Walter Adhemar Oberladstatter Lutz	Cristina Mabel Aguilera
17 July	Paraguay; Asunción	Rogelio Melgarejo	Liz Marian Sánchez
17 July	Tunisia; Tunis	Maher Habouria	Alma Abroud
17 July	Tunisia; Tunis	Med Ali Souissi	Nadia Turki
17 July	Tunisia; Tunis	Houcem Krid	Nouha Abroug
20–21 July	Indonesia; Banyuwangi	Zaenal Fanani	Dela Anjar Wulan
20–21 July	Indonesia; Banyuwangi	Ihza Muhammad	Sarini Sarini
20–21 July	Indonesia; Banyuwangi	Muhammad Maydanil	Sayu Bella Sukma Dewi
22–23 July	Slovakia; Košice	Matej Ulík	Janka Keseg Števková
22–23 July	Slovakia; Košice	Martin Haring	Tereza Kurnická
22–23 July	Slovakia; Košice	Tomáš Višňovský	Martina Krahulcová
22–23 July	Hungary; Csömör	Zsombor Palumby	Virág Buzsáki
22–23 July	Hungary; Csömör	Balázs Sylvester	Regina Schmidel
22–23 July	Hungary; Csömör	András Szatmáry	Csenge Anna Bokros
22–23 July	United Kingdom; Kirroughtree	Cameron Orr	Annie Last
22–23 July	United Kingdom; Kirroughtree	Thomas Mein	Evie Richards
22–23 July	United Kingdom; Kirroughtree	Isaac Mundy	Isla Short
22–24 July	Spain; Candeleda	David Valero	Rocío del Alba
22–24 July	Spain; Candeleda	Pablo Rodríguez	Núria Bosch
22–24 July	Spain; Candeleda	Ismael Esteban Agüero	Natalia Fischer
23 July	Greece; Lasithi	Periklis Ilias	Eleftheria Giachou
23 July	Greece; Lasithi	Dimitrios Antoniadis	Varvara Fasoi
23 July	Greece; Lasithi	Ilias Tsortouktsidis	Aikaterini Eleftheriadou
23 July	Lithuania; Šiauliai	Ignas Ambrazas	Kataržina Sosna
23 July	Lithuania; Šiauliai	Šarūnas Pacevičius	Greta Karasiovaitė
23 July	Lithuania; Šiauliai	Domas Manikas	Viltė Kriaučiūnaite
23 July	Austria; Hohenems	Max Foidl	Mona Mitterwallner
23 July	Austria; Hohenems	Gregor Raggl	Tamara Wiedmann
23 July	Austria; Hohenems	Moritz Bscherer	Corina Druml
23–24 July	Netherlands; Spaarnwoude	David Nordemann	Anne Terpstra
23–24 July	Netherlands; Spaarnwoude	Stan Godrie	Lotte Koopmans
23–24 July	Netherlands; Spaarnwoude	Wim de Bruin	Denise Betsema
23–24 July	Belgium; Houffalize	Jens Schuermans	Emeline Detilleux
23–24 July	Belgium; Houffalize	Pierre de Froidmont	Githa Michiels
23–24 July	Belgium; Houffalize	Jens Adams	Steffi Witvrouwen
23–24 July	Canada; Oro Station	Peter Disera	Emily Batty
23–24 July	Canada; Oro Station	Tyler Orschel	Laurie Arseneault
23–24 July	Canada; Oro Station	Quinton Disera	Jennifer Jackson
23–24 July	Bulgaria; Knyazhevo	Martin Papanov	Iveta Kostadinova
23–24 July	Bulgaria; Knyazhevo	Bogdan Stonchev	Asea Borisova
23–24 July	Bulgaria; Knyazhevo	Stanimir Ivanov	Bronze medal
23–24 July	Ireland; Leinster	Christopher McGlinchey	Caoimhe May
23–24 July	Ireland; Leinster	David Montgomery	Hannah McClorey
23–24 July	Ireland; Leinster	Darnell Moore	Niamh McKiverigan
23–24 July	Serbia; Novi Sad	Roman Aleksandar	Teodora Savić Popović
23–24 July	Serbia; Novi Sad	Marko Stanimirović	Jana Jolović
23–24 July	Serbia; Novi Sad	Jovan Divnić	Bojana Jovanović
23–24 July	Venezuela; Miranda	Sandro Muñoz	Yngrid Porras
23–24 July	Venezuela; Miranda	Yonathan Josué Mejía González	Andrea Contreras
23–24 July	Venezuela; Miranda	Yhean Carpio	Sarah Penso
24 July	Kazakhstan; Tekeli	Denis Sergienko	Tatyana Geneleva
24 July	Kazakhstan; Tekeli	Yegor Karassyov	Alina Sarkulova
24 July	Kazakhstan; Tekeli	Temirlan Mukhamediyanov	Ekaterina Stepanova
24 July	Poland; Boguszów-Gorce	Bartłomiej Wawak	Paula Gorycka
24 July	Poland; Boguszów-Gorce	Krzysztof Łukasik	Klaudia Czabok
24 July	Poland; Boguszów-Gorce	Filip Helta	Gabriela Wojtyła
24 July	Turkey; Yalova	Emre Yavuz	Azize Bekar
24 July	Turkey; Yalova	Süleyman Temel	Semra Yetiş
24 July	Turkey; Yalova	Furkan Akçam	Asuman Burcu Balcı
24 July	Czech Republic; Břasy	Ondřej Cink	Jana Czeczinkarová
24 July	Czech Republic; Břasy	Jaroslav Kulhavý	Adéla Holubová
24 July	Czech Republic; Břasy	Lukáš Kobes	Tereza Tvarůžková
24 July	Colombia; Pereira	Fabio Castañeda	Diana Pinilla
24 July	Colombia; Pereira	Juan Fernando Monroy	Gloria Garzón
24 July	Colombia; Pereira	Jhonnatan Botero Villegas	Leidy Mera
24 July	Latvia; Talsi	Mārtiņš Blūms	Katrīna Jaunslaviete–Ķipure
24 July	Latvia; Talsi	Māris Bogdanovičs	Evelīna Ermane Marčenko
24 July	Latvia; Talsi	Jēkabs Vītols	Zane Priede
24 July	Estonia; Otepää	Josten Vaidem	Janika Lõiv
24 July	Estonia; Otepää	Peeter Tarvis	Mari-Liis Mõttus
24 July	Estonia; Otepää	Kirill Tarassov	Merili Sirvel
24 July	Bosnia and Herzegovina; Ljubuški	Vedad Karic	Lejla Tanović
24 July	Bosnia and Herzegovina; Ljubuški	Dražen Akrap	Martina Čondra
24 July	Bosnia and Herzegovina; Ljubuški	Dragan Subotić	Bronze medal
24 July	United States; Winter Park	Keegan Swenson	Savilia Blunk
24 July	United States; Winter Park	Christopher Blevins	Kate Courtney
24 July	United States; Winter Park	Eric Brunner	Gwendalyn Gibson
24 July	Georgia; Tbilisi	Gold medal	Veriko Bazali
24 July	Georgia; Tbilisi	Silver medal	Mariam Tsutskiridze
24 July	Georgia; Tbilisi	Bronze medal	Chito Chelebadze
24 July	Namibia; Swakopmund	Alex Miller	Monique Du Plessis
24 July	Namibia; Swakopmund	Xavier Papo	Nicola Fester
24 July	Namibia; Swakopmund	Marc Epler	Marion Schonecke
24 July	Italy; Valle di Casies	Gerhard Kerschbaumer	Martina Berta
24 July	Italy; Valle di Casies	Juri Zanotti	Chiara Teocchi
24 July	Italy; Valle di Casies	Luca Braidot	Giorgia Marchet
24 July	Finland; Kerava	Niko Heikkilä	Sini Alusniemi
24 July	Finland; Kerava	Sakari Lehtinen	Anne-Kristiina Visuri
24 July	Finland; Kerava	Samuel Pökälä	Noora Kanerva
24 July	North Macedonia; Kumanovo	Dimitar Jovanoski	Dunja Ivanova
24 July	North Macedonia; Kumanovo	Emil Cvetanov	Andrijana Anastasoska
24 July	North Macedonia; Kumanovo	Boris Stefanovski	Bronze medal
24 July	Luxembourg; Diekirch	Søren Nissen	Isabelle Klein
24 July	Luxembourg; Diekirch	Scott Thiltges	Silver medal
24 July	Luxembourg; Diekirch	Philipp Bützow	Bronze medal
24 July	Croatia; Cvituša	Fran Bošnjak	Larisa Bošnjak
24 July	Croatia; Cvituša	Anthony Bilić	Jana Filipović
24 July	Croatia; Cvituša	Martin Legović	Ana Rumiha
24 July	Guatemala; Guatemala City	Jonathan de León	Florinda De León
24 July	Guatemala; Guatemala City	Esdras Morales	Olga Mariela Rodas
24 July	Guatemala; Guatemala City	Jason Hidalgo Ávila	Mary Burge
24 July	Sweden; Järfälla Municipality	Viggo Karlsson	Jenny Rissveds
24 July	Sweden; Järfälla Municipality	André Eriksson	Linn Gustafzzon
24 July	Sweden; Järfälla Municipality	Viktor Lindquist	Emma Belforth
24 July	Montenegro; Nikšić	Goran Cerović	Gold medal
24 July	Montenegro; Nikšić	Miloš Lazarević	Silver medal
24 July	Montenegro; Nikšić	Miloš Mikić	Bronze medal
6–7 August	China; Nanjing	Kuan Jie Feng	Zhenglan Liang
6–7 August	China; Nanjing	Jinwei Yuan	Hongfeng Li
6–7 August	China; Nanjing	Jiujiang Mi	Wu Zhifan
10–12 September	Iran; Tehran	Faraz Shukhri	Faranak Parto Azar
10–12 September	Iran; Tehran	Parviz Mardani	Mona Farahbakhshian
10–12 September	Iran; Tehran	Farshid Salehian	Shirin Zarinkalakh
15–17 September	Chile; Talca	Martín Vidaurre	Yarela González
15–17 September	Chile; Talca	Ignacio Gallo	María Moreno Camus
15–17 September	Chile; Talca	Nicolás Delich	Catalina Vidaurre
18 September	Uruguay; Costa Azul	Eduardo Sayavedra	Ana Laura Fontes
18 September	Uruguay; Costa Azul	Nicolás Ardohain	Analía Pérez
18 September	Uruguay; Costa Azul	Hernán Silvera Pica	Bronze medal
25 September	Cyprus; Troodos Mountains	Christos Philokyprou	Gold medal
25 September	Cyprus; Troodos Mountains	Konstantinos Pavlides	Silver medal
25 September	Cyprus; Troodos Mountains	Constantinos Thymides	Bronze medal
25 September	Panama; Panama City	Roberto José Herrera	Valeska Domínguez
25 September	Panama; Panama City	Manuel Otero	Yineth Kellyam Cubilla
25 September	Panama; Panama City	David Díaz	Bronze medal
2 October	Portugal; Leiria	Ricardo Marinheiro	Raquel Queirós
2 October	Portugal; Leiria	José Dias	Joana Monteiro
2 October	Portugal; Leiria	David Rosa	Marta Branco
9 October	Brazil; Conceição do Mato Dentro	Henrique Avancini	Raiza Goulão
9 October	Brazil; Conceição do Mato Dentro	Ulan Galinski	Isabella Lacerda
9 October	Brazil; Conceição do Mato Dentro	Bruno Martins Lemes	Karen Olímpio
31 October	Ukraine; Chernivtsi	Gold medal	Gold medal
31 October	Ukraine; Chernivtsi	Silver medal	Silver medal
31 October	Ukraine; Chernivtsi	Bronze medal	Bronze medal
18–20 November	Japan; Izu	Ari Hirabayashi	Mio Suemasa
18–20 November	Japan; Izu	Riki Kitabayashi	Yōko Hashiguchi
18–20 November	Japan; Izu	Kohei Yamamoto	Chie Hirata

=== XCC Short Track ===
Date	Venue	Podium (Men)	Podium (Women)
16 February	Australia; Maydena	Jared Graves	Rebecca McConnell
16 February	Australia; Maydena	Matthew Dinham	Zoe Cuthbert
16 February	Australia; Maydena	Sam Fox	Alice Patterson-Robert
29 May	Switzerland; Lugano	Filippo Colombo	Jolanda Neff
29 May	Switzerland; Lugano	Vital Albin	Linda Indergand
29 May	Switzerland; Lugano	Andri Frischknecht	Sina Frei
3 June	Israel; Shefa-Amr	Tomer Zaltsman	Na'ama Noyman
3 June	Israel; Shefa-Amr	Eitan Levi	Naomi Luria
3 June	Israel; Shefa-Amr	Yotam Deshe	Yasmin Keren
4 June	Belgium; Genk	Daan Soete	Émeline Detilleux
4 June	Belgium; Genk	Pierre de Froidmont	Steffi Witvrouwen
4 June	Belgium; Genk	Jarne Vandersteen	Britt Segers
4 June	Singapore; Singapore	Riyadh Hakim Lukman	Tsalina Phang
4 June	Singapore; Singapore	Farouk Effendy Bujang	Silver medal
4 June	Singapore; Singapore	Junaidy Salleh	Bronze medal
4 June	Puerto Rico; Salinas	Jacob Morales Ortega	Annelly Oviedo Vázquez
4 June	Puerto Rico; Salinas	Georwill Pérez Román	Suheily Rodríguez Cruz
4 June	Puerto Rico; Salinas	Ricky Morales	Bridalis Zea Arriaga
16 June	Romania; Cluj-Napoca	Vlad Dascălu	Manuela Mureșan
16 June	Romania; Cluj-Napoca	József-Attila Malnasi	Salomé Bondor
16 June	Romania; Cluj-Napoca	Lucian Logigan	Suzanne Hilbert
17 June	Italy; Courmayeur	Daniele Braidot	Martina Berta
17 June	Italy; Courmayeur	Filippo Fontana	Chiara Teocchi
17 June	Italy; Courmayeur	Juri Zanotti	Giorgia Marchet
17 June	Austria; Graz	Gregor Raggl	Laura Stigger
17 June	Austria; Graz	Max Foidl	Corina Druml
17 June	Austria; Graz	Kilian Feurstein	Tamara Wiedmann
19 June	Norway; Lillehammer	Ole Sigurd Rekdahl	Ingrid Bøe Jacobsen
19 June	Norway; Lillehammer	Knut Røhme	Hedda Brenningen Bjørklund
19 June	Norway; Lillehammer	Erik Hægstad	Oda LaForce
25–26 June	Denmark; Rold Skov, Himmerland	Jonas Lindberg	Caroline Bohé
25–26 June	Denmark; Rold Skov, Himmerland	Sebastian Fini Carstensen	Sofie Heby Pedersen
25–26 June	Denmark; Rold Skov, Himmerland	Simon Andreassen	Malene Degn
25–26 June	Honduras; Tegucigalpa	Luis López	Gissel Andino
25–26 June	Honduras; Tegucigalpa	Pablo Cruz	Karen Elisa Amaya
25–26 June	Honduras; Tegucigalpa	Cristhian Martínez	Karen Canales
30 June	France; Plœuc-l'Hermitage	Maxime Loret	Pauline Ferrand-Prévot
30 June	France; Plœuc-l'Hermitage	Thomas Griot	Léna Gérault
30 June	France; Plœuc-l'Hermitage	Joshua Dubau	Hélène Clauzel
15 July	Ecuador; Loja	William Tobay Mogrovejo	Michela Molina Arizaga
15 July	Ecuador; Loja	Juan Córdova Suárez	Miryam Núñez
15 July	Ecuador; Loja	Martín Alejandro Cruz	Daniela Machuca
21 July	Kazakhstan; Talgar	Yegor Karassyov	Tatyana Geneleva
21 July	Kazakhstan; Talgar	Denis Sergienko	Alina Sarkulova
21 July	Kazakhstan; Talgar	Andrei Nityazhuk	Ekaterina Stepanova
22 July	Sweden; Järfälla	André Eriksson	Jenny Rissveds
22 July	Sweden; Järfälla	Oscar Lind	Linn Gustafzzon
22 July	Sweden; Järfälla	Axel Lindh	Sara Öberg
22 July 2022	Colombia; Pereira	Juan Fernando Monroy	Angie Lara
22 July 2022	Colombia; Pereira	Fabio Castañeda	Diana Pinilla
22 July 2022	Colombia; Pereira	Camilo Gómez	Ana María Roa
22 July 2022	Poland; Boguszów-Gorce	Krzysztof Łukasik	Matylda Szczecińska
22 July 2022	Poland; Boguszów-Gorce	Bartłomiej Wawak	Paula Gorycka
22 July 2022	Poland; Boguszów-Gorce	Michał Topór	Gabriela Wojtyła
22 July 2022	Turkey; Yalova	Zeki Kaygısız	Azize Bekar
22 July 2022	Turkey; Yalova	Serdar Anıl Depe	Semra Yetiş
22 July 2022	Turkey; Yalova	Emre Yavuz	Asuman Burcu Balcı
22–23 July	Hungary; Csömör	Zsombor Palumby	Virág Buzsáki
22–23 July	Hungary; Csömör	Attila Gerely	Csenge Anna Bokros
22–23 July	Hungary; Csömör	Balázs Sylvester	Regina Schmidel
22–23 July	United Kingdom; Kirroughtree	Charlie Aldridge	Annie Last
22–23 July	United Kingdom; Kirroughtree	Cameron Orr	Evie Richards
22–23 July	United Kingdom; Kirroughtree	Cameron Mason	Harriet Harnden
23–24 July	Canada; Oro Station	Carter Woods	Laurie Arseneault
23–24 July	Canada; Oro Station	Quinton Disera	Emily Batty
23–24 July	Canada; Oro Station	Sean Fincham	Jennifer Jackson
23–24 July	Venezuela; Miranda	Sandro Muñoz	Yngrid Porras
23–24 July	Venezuela; Miranda	Yonathan Josué Mejía González	Andrea Contreras
23–24 July	Venezuela; Miranda	Ruddy Rodríguez	Katherine Lindo
23–24 July	Finland; Seinäjoki	Niko Heikkilä	Henna-Mari Havana
23–24 July	Finland; Seinäjoki	Sakari Lehtinen	Noora Kanerva
23–24 July	Finland; Seinäjoki	Iiro Sairanen	Kajsa Salmela
24 July	Greece; Lasithi	Dimitrios Antoniadis	Eleftheria Giachou
24 July	Greece; Lasithi	Periklis Ilias	Alexandra Adam
24 July	Greece; Lasithi	Ilias Tsortouktsidis	Eirini Maria Karousou
24 July	United States; Winter Park	Christopher Blevins	Kate Courtney
24 July	United States; Winter Park	Stephan Davoust	Savilia Blunk
24 July	United States; Winter Park	Russell Finsterwald	Kelsey Urban
24 July	Estonia; Otepää	Kirill Tarassov	Janika Lõiv
24 July	Estonia; Otepää	Gert Jõeäär	Mari-Liis Mõttus
24 July	Estonia; Otepää	Josten Vaidem	Maaris Meier
12 August	Czech Republic; Harrachov	Jan Zatloukal	Jitka Čábelická
12 August	Czech Republic; Harrachov	Lukáš Kobes	Tereza Tvarůžková
12 August	Czech Republic; Harrachov	Marek Rauchfuss	Adéla Holubová
10 September	Paraguay; Ayolas	Esteban Portillo	Samira Martínez
10 September	Paraguay; Ayolas	Lucas Bogado	Sara Torres
10 September	Paraguay; Ayolas	Abel Cristaldo	Anelia Paredes
10 September	Slovakia; Selce	Martin Haring	Terka Kurnická
10 September	Slovakia; Selce	Kristián Jánošík	Janka Keseg Števková
10 September	Slovakia; Selce	Martin Hrtánek	Erika Glajzová
18 September	Slovenia; Domžale	Rok Naglič	Tanja Žakelj
18 September	Slovenia; Domžale	Matjaž Lozar	Vita Movrin
18 September	Slovenia; Domžale	Jakob Klemenčič	Maruša Naglič
23 September	Spain; Girona	David Valero	Lucía Gómez
23 September	Spain; Girona	Jofre Cullell	Rocío del Alba García
23 September	Spain; Girona	David Campos Motos	Estíbaliz Sagardoy
1 October	Portugal; Leiria	Gonçalo Amado	Raquel Queirós
1 October	Portugal; Leiria	Ricardo Marinheiro	Joana Monteiro
1 October	Portugal; Leiria	Bruno Silva	Catarina Faroppa
1 October	Germany; Titisee-Neustadt	Luca Schwarzbauer	Leonie Daubermann
1 October	Germany; Titisee-Neustadt	Maximilian Brandl	Finja Lipp
1 October	Germany; Titisee-Neustadt	David List	Nadine Rieder
8 October	Brazil; Conceição do Mato Dentro	Henrique Avancini	Raiza Goulão
8 October	Brazil; Conceição do Mato Dentro	Alex Malacarne	Isabella Lacerda
8 October	Brazil; Conceição do Mato Dentro	Gustavo Xavier De Oliveira	Karen Olímpio
23 October	Argentina; Pilar	Gold medal	Gold medal
23 October	Argentina; Pilar	Silver medal	Silver medal
23 October	Argentina; Pilar	Bronze medal	Bronze medal
30 October	Ukraine; Chernivtsi	Gold medal	Gold medal
30 October	Ukraine; Chernivtsi	Silver medal	Silver medal
30 October	Ukraine; Chernivtsi	Bronze medal	Bronze medal
6 November	Japan; Chiba Prefecture	Toki Sawada	Akari Kobayashi
6 November	Japan; Chiba Prefecture	Riki Kitabayashi	Yuuka Yabuki
6 November	Japan; Chiba Prefecture	Sho Takahashi	Bronze medal

=== XCE ===
Date	Venue	Podium (Men)	Podium (Women)
16 June	Austria; Graz	Kilian Feurstein	Laura Stigger
16 June	Austria; Graz	Theo Hauser	Corina Druml
16 June	Austria; Graz	Alexander Hämmerle	Katharina Sadnik
18 June	Norway; Lillehammer	Martin Farstadvoll	Ingrid Bøe Jacobsen
18 June	Norway; Lillehammer	Patrick Fossum Kristoffersen	Lisa Kristine Jorde
18 June	Norway; Lillehammer	Henrik Farstadvoll	Oda LaForce
24–26 June	Argentina; Santa María	Joaquín Vera	Agustina Quiróz
24–26 June	Argentina; Santa María	Agustín Durán	Florencia Ávila
24–26 June	Argentina; Santa María	Dario Alejandro Gasco	Pilar Adoue
26 June	Italy; La Thuile	Filippo Agostinacchio	Gaia Tormena
26 June	Italy; La Thuile	Cristian Bernardi	Marta Zanga
26 June	Italy; La Thuile	Emanuele Bocchio Vega	Julia Maria Graf
28 June	Sweden; Linköping	Edvin Lindh	Ella Holmegård
28 June	Sweden; Linköping	Axel Lindh	Agnes Abrahamsson
28 June	Sweden; Linköping	Joel Burman	Iza Härdelin
1 July	France; Plœuc-l'Hermitage	Titouan Perrin-Ganier	Coline Clauzure
1 July	France; Plœuc-l'Hermitage	Killian Demangeon	Amélie Vazeille
1 July	France; Plœuc-l'Hermitage	Antoine Orchampt	Noémie Garnier
16 July	Ecuador; Loja	William Tobay Mogrovejo	Miryam Núñez
16 July	Ecuador; Loja	José Sarmiento Álvarez	Michela Molina Arizaga
16 July	Ecuador; Loja	Diego Carrión Solano	Daniela Machuca
21 July	Indonesia; Banyuwangi	Ihza Muhammad	Yunia Angelly Syahdat
21 July	Indonesia; Banyuwangi	Renoza Aldi Pratama	Noor Maida Salma
21 July	Indonesia; Banyuwangi	Rizaldi Ashadiqqi Ridha	Ela Restiyana
22 July	Bosnia and Herzegovina; Ljubuški	Gold medal	Gold medal
22 July	Bosnia and Herzegovina; Ljubuški	Silver medal	Silver medal
22 July	Bosnia and Herzegovina; Ljubuški	Bronze medal	Bronze medal
22–24 July	Spain; Candeleda	Jorge Punzón	Sara Gay
22–24 July	Spain; Candeleda	Alberto Mingorance	Ainara Elbusto
22–24 July	Spain; Candeleda	Danny Buba	Sara Cueto
23 July 2022	Turkey; Yalova	Okan Aydoğan	Azize Bekar
23 July 2022	Turkey; Yalova	Emre Yuca	Semra Yetiş
23 July 2022	Turkey; Yalova	Veysel Gülmez	Semanur Ki̇ri̇ş
23 July	Finland; Kerava	Matias Ahtosalo	Kajsa Salmela
23 July	Finland; Kerava	Niko Heikkilä	Antonia Haga
23 July	Finland; Kerava	Severi Savukoski	Noora Kanerva
24 July	Slovenia; Kranj	Jakob Klemenčič	Maruša Naglič
24 July	Slovenia; Kranj	Tilen Jagodič	Silver medal
24 July	Slovenia; Kranj	Matic Kranjec Žagar	Bronze medal
11 September	Slovakia; Selce	Kristián Jánošík	Terézia Ciriaková
11 September	Slovakia; Selce	Florián Papcun	Terka Kurnická
11 September	Slovakia; Selce	Martin Hrtánek	Laura Lukáčová
11 September	Hungary; Mosonmagyaróvár	Attila Gerely	Lora Oravecz
11 September	Hungary; Mosonmagyaróvár	Zsombor Palumby	Alexandra Deák
11 September	Hungary; Mosonmagyaróvár	Olivér Csonka	Bronze medal
11 September	Spain; Ramales de la Victoria	Sergio Mantecón Gutiérrez	María Díaz Pernía
11 September	Spain; Ramales de la Victoria	Roberto Bou Martín	Meritxell Figueras Garangou
11 September	Spain; Ramales de la Victoria	Ismael Esteban Agüero	Cristina Morán Roza
23 September	Romania; Câmpulung	Ede Molnár	Raissa Costea
23 September	Romania; Câmpulung	Roberto Burta	Eszter Bereczki
23 September	Romania; Câmpulung	Mate Szakacs	Miruna Mada
24 September	Croatia; Metković	Gold medal	Gold medal
24 September	Croatia; Metković	Silver medal	Silver medal
24 September	Croatia; Metković	Bronze medal	Bronze medal
1 October	Greece; Mithymna	Dimitrios Antoniadis	Gold medal
1 October	Greece; Mithymna	Efstathios Akritidis	Silver medal
1 October	Greece; Mithymna	Alexandros Karousos	Bronze medal
21 October	New Zealand; Rotorua	Anton Cooper	Sammie Maxwell
21 October	New Zealand; Rotorua	Ben Oliver	Mia Cameron
21 October	New Zealand; Rotorua	Lochlan Brown	Jessica Manchester
29 October	Ukraine; Chernivtsi	—	—
29 October	Ukraine; Chernivtsi	—	—
29 October	Ukraine; Chernivtsi	—	—
30 October	Cyprus; Lakatamia	Christos Philokyprou	Constantina Georgiou
30 October	Cyprus; Lakatamia	Andreas Athanasiadis	Styliana Kamilari
30 October	Cyprus; Lakatamia	Constantinos Thymides	Bronze medal
5 November	Japan; Chiba Prefecture	Yuta Matsumoto	Yūki Hirose
5 November	Japan; Chiba Prefecture	Fumiya Kurose	Akari Kobayashi
5 November	Japan; Chiba Prefecture	Norio Sawaki	Bronze medal
To be announced	Portugal; Leiria	Gold medal	Gold medal
To be announced	Portugal; Leiria	Silver medal	Silver medal
To be announced	Portugal; Leiria	Bronze medal	Bronze medal

=== XCM ===
Date	Venue	Podium (Men)	Podium (Women)
27 March	Argentina; Mina Clavero	Fernando Contreras	Carolina Pérez
27 March	Argentina; Mina Clavero	German Dorhmann	Carolina Maldonado
27 March	Argentina; Mina Clavero	Nicolás Tivani	Yésica Cantelmi
24 April 2022	Hungary; Bőszénfa	András Szatmáry	Regina Schmidel
24 April 2022	Hungary; Bőszénfa	Márton Blazsó	Adél Horváth
24 April 2022	Hungary; Bőszénfa	Balázs Ferenczi	Viktória Szekeres
8 May 2022	Portugal; Estremoz	Tiago Ferreira	Joana Monteiro
8 May 2022	Portugal; Estremoz	Bruno Sancho	Celina Carpinteiro
8 May 2022	Portugal; Estremoz	Filipe Ramos	Ilda Pereira
14 May 2022	Israel; Ramot Menashe	Guy Niv	Lianne Witkin
14 May 2022	Israel; Ramot Menashe	Shlomi Haimy	Nofar Maoz
14 May 2022	Israel; Ramot Menashe	Elon Cohen	Romi Vladnitski
21 May 2022	Mauritius; Rivière Noire District	Alexandre Mayer	Kimberley Le Court
21 May 2022	Mauritius; Rivière Noire District	Yannick Lincoln	Aurelie Halbwachs
21 May 2022	Mauritius; Rivière Noire District	Gregory Mayer	Célia Halbwachs
29 May 2022	Austria; Kleinzell im Mühlkreis	Daniel Geismayr	Angelika Tazreiter
29 May 2022	Austria; Kleinzell im Mühlkreis	Alban Lakata	Clara Sommer
29 May 2022	Austria; Kleinzell im Mühlkreis	Karl Markt	Sabine Sommer
29 May 2022	Greece; Argithea	Periklis Ilias	Aikaterini Eleftheriadou
29 May 2022	Greece; Argithea	Theodoros Petridis	Alexandra Adam
29 May 2022	Greece; Argithea	Ilias Tsortouktsidis	Varvara Fasoi
29 May 2022	South Africa; Howick	Philip Buys	Amy Wakefield
29 May 2022	South Africa; Howick	Marc Pritzen	Samantha Sanders
29 May 2022	South Africa; Howick	Tristan Nortje	Theresa Ralph
4–5 June 2022	Kazakhstan; Taraz	Denis Sergiyenko	Alina Sarkulova
4–5 June 2022	Kazakhstan; Taraz	Ruslan Aliyev	Tatyana Geneleva
4–5 June 2022	Kazakhstan; Taraz	Temirlan Mukhamediyanov	Yekaterina Stepanova
12 June 2022	Bulgaria; Sliven	Tsvetan Ivanov	Victoria Danova
12 June 2022	Bulgaria; Sliven	Aleksandar Aleksiev	Asea Borisova
12 June 2022	Bulgaria; Sliven	Peter Chavdarov	Iveta Kostadinova
18 June 2022	France; Serre Chevalier	Stéphane Tempier	Léna Gérault
18 June 2022	France; Serre Chevalier	Axel Roudil-Cortinat	Pauline Ferrand-Prévot
18 June 2022	France; Serre Chevalier	Hugo Drechou	Estelle Morel
25 June 2022	Slovakia; Topoľčianky	Tomaš Višňovský	Erika Glajzová
25 June 2022	Slovakia; Topoľčianky	Jakub Jenčuš	Kristina Neč Lapinová
25 June 2022	Slovakia; Topoľčianky	Martin Kostelničák	Martina Krahulcová
2–3 July 2022	Switzerland; Treyvaux	Konny Looser	Steffi Häberlin
2–3 July 2022	Switzerland; Treyvaux	Urs Huber	Irina Lützelschwab
2–3 July 2022	Switzerland; Treyvaux	Martin Fanger	Janina Wüst
3 July 2022	Croatia; Grobnik	Anthony Bilić	Kristina Lukačević
3 July 2022	Croatia; Grobnik	Martin Legović	Antonela Juretić
3 July 2022	Croatia; Grobnik	Denis Bogović	Bronze medal
16 July 2022	Bosnia and Herzegovina; Jahorina	Gold medal	Gold medal
16 July 2022	Bosnia and Herzegovina; Jahorina	Silver medal	Silver medal
16 July 2022	Bosnia and Herzegovina; Jahorina	Bronze medal	Bronze medal
17 July 2022	Italy; Casella	Fabian Rabensteiner	Claudia Peretti
17 July 2022	Italy; Casella	Nicolas Samparisi	Sandra Mairhofer
17 July 2022	Italy; Casella	Massimo Rosa	Chiara Burato
21 July 2022	Colombia; Pereira	Luis Anderson Mejía	Diana Pinilla
21 July 2022	Colombia; Pereira	Bernardo Suaza	Mónica Calderón
21 July 2022	Colombia; Pereira	Jeison Rincón	Gloria Garzón
23 July 2022	Norway; Oslo	Knut Røhme	Hedda Brenningen Bjørklund
23 July 2022	Norway; Oslo	Ole Hem	Miriam Sivertsen
23 July 2022	Norway; Oslo	Tormod Weydahl	Celine Gees Solheim
31 July 2022	Sweden; Ludvika	Emil Lindgren	Nellie Larsson
31 July 2022	Sweden; Ludvika	Jacob Söderqvist	Jennie Stenerhag
31 July 2022	Sweden; Ludvika	David Risberg	Tilda Hylén
6 August 2022	Lithuania; Lapiai	Eimantas Gudiškis	Kataržina Sosna
6 August 2022	Lithuania; Lapiai	Šarūnas Pacevičius	Greta Karasiovaitė
6 August 2022	Lithuania; Lapiai	Domas Manikas	Daiva Ragažinskienė
6 August 2022	Estonia; Kullamaa	Peeter Tarvis	Janelle Uibokand
6 August 2022	Estonia; Kullamaa	Peeter Pruus	Greete Steinburg
6 August 2022	Estonia; Kullamaa	Josten Vaidem	Liisa Ehrberg
13 August 2022	United Kingdom; Kielder Forest	Ben Thomas	Amy Henchoz
13 August 2022	United Kingdom; Kielder Forest	Thomas Mein	Sophie Johnson
13 August 2022	United Kingdom; Kielder Forest	Cameron Orr	Christina Wiejak
14 August 2022	Brazil; Bahia	Guilherme Müller	Raiza Goulão
14 August 2022	Brazil; Bahia	Luiz Miguel Campos Honório	Karen Olímpio
14 August 2022	Brazil; Bahia	Kennedi Sampaio	Daniela Araújo
27 August 2022	Romania; Saschiz	József–Attila Málnási	Manuela Mureşan
27 August 2022	Romania; Saschiz	George-Bogdan Duca	Eniko-Salome Bondor
27 August 2022	Romania; Saschiz	Roberto-Dumitru Burta	Suzanne Hilbert
28 August 2022	Latvia; Kūkas Parish	Oskars Muižnieks	Katrīna Jaunslaviete-Ķipure
28 August 2022	Latvia; Kūkas Parish	Māris Bogdanovičs	Vija Frīda
28 August 2022	Latvia; Kūkas Parish	Lauris Purniņš	Zane Ķelpe
3 September 2022	Belgium; La Roche-en-Ardenne	Frans Claes	Joyce Vanderbeken
3 September 2022	Belgium; La Roche-en-Ardenne	Thomas Sprengers	Alyssa Lurquin
3 September 2022	Belgium; La Roche-en-Ardenne	Joris Massaer	Sara Michielsens
3 September 2022	Luxembourg; La Roche-en-Ardenne (Belgium)	Sören Nissen	Isabelle Klein
3 September 2022	Luxembourg; La Roche-en-Ardenne (Belgium)	Pol Flesch	Fabienne Schauss
3 September 2022	Luxembourg; La Roche-en-Ardenne (Belgium)	Jacques Dahm	Bronze medal
3 September 2022	Finland; Nivala	Gold medal	Gold medal
3 September 2022	Finland; Nivala	Silver medal	Silver medal
3 September 2022	Finland; Nivala	Bronze medal	Bronze medal
4 September 2022	Denmark; Slagelse	Jonas Lindberg	Viktoria Smidth Knudsen
4 September 2022	Denmark; Slagelse	Ian Millennium	Ann-Dorthe Lisbygd
4 September 2022	Denmark; Slagelse	Mathias Pedersen	Klara Sofie Hansen
10 September 2022	Poland; Bardo	Paweł Bernas	Barbara Borowiecka
10 September 2022	Poland; Bardo	Michał Paluta	Zuzana Krzystała
10 September 2022	Poland; Bardo	Michał Glanz	Aleksandra Andrzejewska
25 September 2022	Serbia; Kragujevac	Gold medal	Gold medal
25 September 2022	Serbia; Kragujevac	Silver medal	Silver medal
25 September 2022	Serbia; Kragujevac	Bronze medal	Bronze medal
25 September 2022	Netherlands; Gasselte	Gold medal	Gold medal
25 September 2022	Netherlands; Gasselte	Silver medal	Silver medal
25 September 2022	Netherlands; Gasselte	Bronze medal	Bronze medal
25 September 2022	Venezuela; Mérida	Gold medal	Gold medal
25 September 2022	Venezuela; Mérida	Silver medal	Silver medal
25 September 2022	Venezuela; Mérida	Bronze medal	Bronze medal
1 October	Germany; Titisee-Neustadt	Andreas Seewald	Adelheid Morath
1 October	Germany; Titisee-Neustadt	Simon Schneller	Sina van Thiel
1 October	Germany; Titisee-Neustadt	Sascha Weber	Vanessa Schmidt
22 October	Namibia; Windhoek	Alex Miller	Vera Looser
22 October	Namibia; Windhoek	Tristan de Lange	Anri Krügel
22 October	Namibia; Windhoek	Ingram Cuff	Courtney Liebenberg
23 October	United States; Frederick	Gold medal	Gold medal
23 October	United States; Frederick	Silver medal	Silver medal
23 October	United States; Frederick	Bronze medal	Bronze medal
23 October	New Zealand; Rotorua	Ben Oliver	Sammie Maxwell
23 October	New Zealand; Rotorua	Cameron Jones	Samara Sheppard
23 October	New Zealand; Rotorua	(Australia) Sam Fox	(Australia) Matilda Raynolds
19–20 November	Ecuador; Pichincha	Willman Andrés Bravo Ávila	Kelly Reyes
19–20 November	Ecuador; Pichincha	Diego Carrión Solano	Silver medal
19–20 November	Ecuador; Pichincha	Jean Paúl Aguirre	Bronze medal
27 November	Paraguay; Villarrica	Máximo Abel Cristaldo	Silvia María Rodas Maldonado
27 November	Paraguay; Villarrica	Juan Pablo Villamayor Romero	Samira Noemi Martínez Méndez
27 November	Paraguay; Villarrica	Rubén Darío Armoa	Analia Belen Dietze Reckziegel

=== E-Bike ===
Date	Venue	Podium (Men)	Podium (Women)
16 February	Australia; Maydena	Josh Carlson	Jody Mielke
16 February	Australia; Maydena	Caleb Dodds	Silver medal
16 February	Australia; Maydena	Glen Goggin	Bronze medal
7 May	France; Accous	Nicolas Vouilloz	Laura Charles
7 May	France; Accous	Antoine Rogge	Justine Tonso
7 May	France; Accous	Lévy Batista	Bronze medal
8 May	Portugal; Estremoz	Lisandro Sousa	Gold medal
8 May	Portugal; Estremoz	Nuno Pires	Silver medal
8 May	Portugal; Estremoz	Carlos Brás	Bronze medal
19 June	Italy; Rocca Canavese	Matteo Berta	Alia Marcellini
19 June	Italy; Rocca Canavese	Andrea Garibbo	Jessica Bormolini
19 June	Italy; Rocca Canavese	Matteo Raimondi	Ania Bocchini
16–18 July	Venezuela; La Guaira	Fabio Mendoza	Andrea Pinto Peche
16–18 July	Venezuela; La Guaira	Giacomo Rubinetti	Clara Gómez
16–18 July	Venezuela; La Guaira	Andrés Donofrio	Bronze medal
22–24 July	Czech Republic; Břasy	Gold medal	Gold medal
22–24 July	Czech Republic; Břasy	Silver medal	Silver medal
22–24 July	Czech Republic; Břasy	Bronze medal	Bronze medal
24 July	Namibia; Swakopmund	Gold medal	Gold medal
24 July	Namibia; Swakopmund	Silver medal	Silver medal
24 July	Namibia; Swakopmund	Bronze medal	Bronze medal
24 July	Italy; Valle di Casies	Martino Fruet	Anna Oberparleiter
24 July	Italy; Valle di Casies	Mirko Tabacchi	Camilla Martinet
24 July	Italy; Valle di Casies	Marco Pavan	Barbara Oberdorfer
10–11 September	Switzerland; Disentis	Joris Ryf	Nicole Göldi
10–11 September	Switzerland; Disentis	Fabio Spena	Nathalie Schneitter
10–11 September	Switzerland; Disentis	Loïc Noël	Kathrin Stirnemann

=== Pump Track ===
Date	Venue	Podium (Men)	Podium (Women)
17–18 February	Australia; Maydena	Jayce Cunning	Caroline Buchanan
17–18 February	Australia; Maydena	Oliver Moran	Shannon Petre
17–18 February	Australia; Maydena	Ryan Gilchrist	Harriet Burbidge-Smith
23–24 April	Germany; Heubach	Philip Schaub	Laura Brethauer
23–24 April	Germany; Heubach	Luca Eckhardt	Jessica Schumach
23–24 April	Germany; Heubach	Samuel Schoger	Emelie Holdenried
5 June	Belgium; Genk	Didi Van Tiggel	Lies'l Schevenels
5 June	Belgium; Genk	Wannes Magdelijns	Silver medal
5 June	Belgium; Genk	Brecht Put	Bronze medal
18 June	Norway; Sandnes	Sebastian Aslaksrud	Annika Pettersen
18 June	Norway; Sandnes	Niklas Halvorsen	Hege Haga Idsøe
18 June	Norway; Sandnes	Martin Fatnes	Helle Lunde Soma
17 July	Poland; Skarżysko-Kamienna	Damian Konstanty	Anna Domagała
17 July	Poland; Skarżysko-Kamienna	Filip Skowron	Paulina Tuz
17 July	Poland; Skarżysko-Kamienna	Gustaw Dadela	Marta Turoboś
20 August	Slovenia; Zagorje ob Savi	Gaj Gorza	Tamara Homar
20 August	Slovenia; Zagorje ob Savi	Andraž Žnidar	Klara Podlogar
20 August	Slovenia; Zagorje ob Savi	Boris Režabek	Maja Kresnik-Doberšek
4 September	Spain; Huércal de Almería	Alejandro Jesús Alcojor	Gold medal
4 September	Spain; Huércal de Almería	Jon Pardo Pardos	Silver medal
4 September	Spain; Huércal de Almería	Gustavo Alcojor Ramos	Bronze medal
11 September	Italy; Gambettola	Martti Sciortino	Camilla Tagliapietra
11 September	Italy; Gambettola	Alessandro Bassi	Samanta Pesenti
11 September	Italy; Gambettola	Giacomo Gargaglia	Irene Savelli
12 November	Chile; Santiago	Cristóbal Palominos	Renata Urrutia
12 November	Chile; Santiago	Benjamín Salvatierra	Rosario Aguilera
12 November	Chile; Santiago	Bruno Lavagnino	Isidora García

=== Downhill ===
Date	Venue	Podium (Men)	Podium (Women)
19 February	Australia; Maydena	Troy Brosnan	Sian A'Hern
19 February	Australia; Maydena	Connor Fearon	Laura Craft
19 February	Australia; Maydena	Jackson Frew	Harriet Burbidge-Smith
19 February	Thailand; Mukdahan	Methasit Boonsane	Vipavee Deekaballes
19 February	Thailand; Mukdahan	Chinnapat Sukchanya	Tida Panyawan
19 February	Thailand; Mukdahan	Suebsakun Sukchanya	Pawanrat Petchleu
27 February	New Zealand; Christchurch	George Brannigan	Jess Blewitt
27 February	New Zealand; Christchurch	Tuhoto-Ariki Pene	Jenna Hastings
27 February	New Zealand; Christchurch	Lachlan Stevens-McNab	Louise Ferguson
5–6 March	Malaysia; Putrajaya	Mohamad Faris Mohd Nashari	Siti Natasha Mohd Basri
5–6 March	Malaysia; Putrajaya	Amer Akbar Anuar	Nia Vanessa Suhana Zaidi
5–6 March	Malaysia; Putrajaya	Yohannes Larenza Meahian	Eddyna Nasuhar Zainal Abidin
5–6 March	South Africa; Pietermaritzburg	Johann Potgieter	Sabine Thies
5–6 March	South Africa; Pietermaritzburg	Connor Finnis	Frankie Du Toit
5–6 March	South Africa; Pietermaritzburg	Rory Kirk	Zandri Strydom
20 March	Cyprus; Nicosia	Giorgos Kouzis	Styliana Kamilari
20 March	Cyprus; Nicosia	Andreas Theodorou	Silver medal
20 March	Cyprus; Nicosia	Alexandros Colombos	Bronze medal
9 – 10 April	Greece; Larissa	Alexandros Topkaroglou	Gold medal
9 – 10 April	Greece; Larissa	Konstantinos Andriotis	Silver medal
9 – 10 April	Greece; Larissa	Athanasios Panagitsas	Bronze medal
16 – 17 April	Argentina; Villa La Angostura	Pablo Seewald de Bariloche	María José Muñoz de San Martín
16 – 17 April	Argentina; Villa La Angostura	Gonzalo Gajdosech	Viviana Saez
16 – 17 April	Argentina; Villa La Angostura	Facundo Descalzo	Florencia Pintos
23 – 24 April	Croatia; Solin	Jure Žabjek	Gold medal
23 – 24 April	Croatia; Solin	Žak Gomilšček	Silver medal
23 – 24 April	Croatia; Solin	Jan Cimperman	Bronze medal
14–15 May	Spain; El Raso	Ángel Suárez	Zoe Zamora
14–15 May	Spain; El Raso	Pau Menoyo	Aina González
14–15 May	Spain; El Raso	Oriel Kirchmayer	Mireia Pi
28–29 May	Czech Republic; Loučná nad Desnou	Stanislav Sehnal	Kristýna Havlická
28–29 May	Czech Republic; Loučná nad Desnou	Antonín Kral	Jana Bártová
28–29 May	Czech Republic; Loučná nad Desnou	Jan Čepelák	Karolína Kadlecová
4 June 2022	Austria; Semmering	David Trummer	Valentina Höll
4 June 2022	Austria; Semmering	Noah Hofmann	Kerstin Sallegger
4 June 2022	Austria; Semmering	Moritz Ribarich	Marlena Neißl
12 June 2022	Lithuania; Ignalina	Karolis Krukauskas	Gold medal
12 June 2022	Lithuania; Ignalina	Matas Krukonis	Silver medal
12 June 2022	Lithuania; Ignalina	Roman Stoma	Bronze medal
17–19 June 2022	Andorra; Vallnord	Álex Iscla Grandvallet	Gold medal
17–19 June 2022	Andorra; Vallnord	Arnau Graslaub Miró	Silver medal
17–19 June 2022	Andorra; Vallnord	Joan Aracil Alba	Bronze medal
18–19 June 2022	Peru; Andahuaylas	Sebastián Alfaro	Rosa Libertad Cruz
18–19 June 2022	Peru; Andahuaylas	Brener Montes	Luz Aquino
18–19 June 2022	Peru; Andahuaylas	Daniel Alcalá	Estela Acurio
19 June	Singapore; Singapore	Riyadh Hakim Lukman	Felicia Ong
19 June	Singapore; Singapore	Mas Ridzwan Bin Mohamed Ali	Nordania Khairunisa Faizal
19 June	Singapore; Singapore	Nicholas Rankine	Bronze medal
2 July	Venezuela; La Guaira	Gold medal	Gold medal
2 July	Venezuela; La Guaira	Silver medal	Silver medal
2 July	Venezuela; La Guaira	Bronze medal	Bronze medal
2–3 July	Kazakhstan; Almaty	Gleb Karmozin	Sabina Fisher
2–3 July	Kazakhstan; Almaty	Alexander Zubenko	Alina Sarkulova
2–3 July	Kazakhstan; Almaty	Raul Rahimov	Ekaterina Stepanova
3 July	Slovenia; Soriška Planina	Žak Gomilšček	Monika Hrastnik
3 July	Slovenia; Soriška Planina	Jan Cimperman	Špela Horvat
3 July	Slovenia; Soriška Planina	Tim Jež	Tina Smrdel
16 July	Tunisia; Tunis	Wissem Kammessi	Gold medal
16 July	Tunisia; Tunis	Abdelatif Jlassi	Silver medal
16 July	Tunisia; Tunis	Med Taha Tarahi	Bronze medal
23 July 2022	Colombia; Pereira	Juan Pablo Pardo	Valentina Garcés
23 July 2022	Colombia; Pereira	Sergio Builes Palacio	Angelly Portilla Reyes
23 July 2022	Colombia; Pereira	Sebastian Posada	Jineth Michel Berdugo
23–24 July	Bulgaria; Vitosha	Stivian Gatev	Denitsa Tosheva
23–24 July	Bulgaria; Vitosha	Jordan Donev	Victoria Goncheva
23–24 July	Bulgaria; Vitosha	Valento Alexandrov	Stefania Karachorova
23–24 July	Canada; Panorama	Gabriel Neron	Gracey Hemstreet
23–24 July	Canada; Panorama	Lucas Cruz	Emmy Lan
23–24 July	Canada; Panorama	Tegan Cruz	Joy Attalla
23–24 July	Ireland; Leinster	Ronan Dunne	Meghan Flanagan
23–24 July	Ireland; Leinster	Daniel Wolfe	Leah Maunsell
23–24 July	Ireland; Leinster	Drew Armstrong	Hannah Mullin
23–24 July	United Kingdom; Glencoe	Greg Williamson	Stacey Fisher
23–24 July	United Kingdom; Glencoe	Adam Brayton	Jessica Stone
23–24 July	United Kingdom; Glencoe	Taylor Vernon	Kerry Wilson
23–24 July	Germany; Ilmenau	Max Hartenstern	Nina Hoffmann
23–24 July	Germany; Ilmenau	Johannes Fischbach	Charlotte Germann
23–24 July	Germany; Ilmenau	Erik Irmisch	Justine Welzel
23–24 July	Indonesia; Banyuwangi	Hildan Afosma Katana	Riska Agustin
23–24 July	Indonesia; Banyuwangi	Muhammad Abdul Hakim	Ayu Tria Adriana
23–24 July	Indonesia; Banyuwangi	Rendy Farera Sanjaya	Rosa Difa Richa
23–24 July	Hungary; Eplény	Marcell Sándor Ferenczi	Abigél Halmai
23–24 July	Hungary; Eplény	Patrik Cserjési	Erzsébet Vincze
23–24 July	Hungary; Eplény	Gábor Lenthár	Borbála Tóth-Almási
23–24 July	United States; Winter Park	Dakotah Norton	Kailey Skelton
23–24 July	United States; Winter Park	Aaron Gwin	Amy Morrison
23–24 July	United States; Winter Park	Austin Dooley	Mazie Hayden
23–24 July	Italy; Sestriere	Davide Cappello	Veronika Widmann
23–24 July	Italy; Sestriere	Loris Revelli	Sophie Riva
23–24 July	Italy; Sestriere	Stefano Introzzi	Lisa Gava
24 July	Costa Rica; San José	Pablo Aguilar Omodeo	Sofía Morales Fallas
24 July	Costa Rica; San José	Johnny Flores Mora	Alexa Chávez González
24 July	Costa Rica; San José	Alvaro Hidalgo Vásquez	Jacsury Mena Aymerich
29–30 July	Slovakia; Ružomberok	Rastislav Baránek	Vilma Gombalová
29–30 July	Slovakia; Ružomberok	Denis Kohút	Sabrina Civínová
29–30 July	Slovakia; Ružomberok	Martin Knapec	Bronze medal
30–31 July	Brazil; Governador Valadares	Gold medal	Gold medal
30–31 July	Brazil; Governador Valadares	Silver medal	Silver medal
30–31 July	Brazil; Governador Valadares	Bronze medal	Bronze medal
30–31 July	Poland; Sienna	Wojciech Ranosz	Katarzyna Burek
30–31 July	Poland; Sienna	Sebastian Macura	Amelia Dudek
30–31 July	Poland; Sienna	Sebastian Podgórski	Oliwia Kulesza
12–13 August	Norway; Hafjell	Simen Smestad	Henriette Bryhn
12–13 August	Norway; Hafjell	Atle Laakso	Ingrid Lonar
12–13 August	Norway; Hafjell	Ole-Herman Bergby	Bronze medal
13–14 August	Estonia; Võru County	Armin Pilv	Gold medal
13–14 August	Estonia; Võru County	Robert Johanson	Silver medal
13–14 August	Estonia; Võru County	Riko Mäeuibo	Bronze medal
13–14 August	Sweden; Hafjell (Norway)	Oliver Zwar	Gold medal
13–14 August	Sweden; Hafjell (Norway)	Benjamin Zwar Kvist	Silver medal
13–14 August	Sweden; Hafjell (Norway)	Adam Eriksson	Bronze medal
21 August	Hong Kong	Shu Sum Lau	Wan Jazz Tai
21 August	Hong Kong	Tsz Kit Kong	Sofie Wyborn
21 August	Hong Kong	Chun Kau Tsui	Chau Ling Wong
8–11 September	France; Les Orres	Antoine Vidal	Myriam Nicole
8–11 September	France; Les Orres	Loïc Bruni	Mathilde Bernard
8–11 September	France; Les Orres	Amaury Pierron	Lisa Bouladou
9–11 September	Romania; Poiana Brașov	Remus Bonta	Roxana Moise
9–11 September	Romania; Poiana Brașov	Cătălin Todor	Ştefania Ababei
9–11 September	Romania; Poiana Brașov	Vlad Nimăt	Suzanne Hilbert
10–11 September	Philippines; Danao	Eleazar Jr. Barba	Lea Denise Belgira
10–11 September	Philippines; Danao	John Derick Farr	Naomi Gardoce
10–11 September	Philippines; Danao	Khastner Fanged	Mayan Doyon
10–12 September	Iran; Tehran	Amiri Kurdi	Gold medal
10–12 September	Iran; Tehran	Hossein Zanjanian	Silver medal
10–12 September	Iran; Tehran	Taha Qabi	Bronze medal
18 September	El Salvador; Santa Tecla	José Mauricio Peña Revelo	Gold medal
18 September	El Salvador; Santa Tecla	Jorge Murcia	Silver medal
18 September	El Salvador; Santa Tecla	Miguel Enrique Peña Revelo	Bronze medal
24–25 September	Japan	Gold medal	Gold medal
24–25 September	Japan	Silver medal	Silver medal
24–25 September	Japan	Bronze medal	Bronze medal
24–25 September	Ecuador; Loja	Gold medal	Gold medal
24–25 September	Ecuador; Loja	Silver medal	Silver medal
24–25 September	Ecuador; Loja	Bronze medal	Bronze medal
5–6 November	Portugal; Seia	Gonçalo Bandeira	Sara Ferreira
5–6 November	Portugal; Seia	José Borges	Ana Leite
5–6 November	Portugal; Seia	Tiago Ladeira	Joana Nunes

=== Enduro ===
Date	Venue	Podium (Men)	Podium (Women)
12 March	Oman; Muscat	Faham al-Khayari	Gold medal
12 March	Oman; Muscat	Shabib al-Bloushi	Silver medal
12 March	Oman; Muscat	Abdulmajeed al-Farsi	Bronze medal
21 April	Israel; Misgav Am	Yonatan Yatom	Noga Korem
21 April	Israel; Misgav Am	Yonatan Maayan	Zohar Bar-Joseph
21 April	Israel; Misgav Am	Tom Amitai	Liza Yakubuk
7 May	Belgium; Aywaille	Martin Maes; Gilles Franck (title shared)	Kristien Nelen
7 May	Belgium; Aywaille	Olivier Bruwiere	Roos Op de Beeck
7 May	Belgium; Aywaille	Tom Boonen	Inge Roggeman
7 May	France; Accous	Alex Rudeau	Isabeau Courdurier
7 May	France; Accous	Hugo Pigeon	Morgane Charre
7 May	France; Accous	Guillaume Larbeyou	Mélanie Pugin
21–22 May	Germany; Willingen	Christian Textor	Raphaela Richter
21–22 May	Germany; Willingen	Petrik Kardinar	Helen Weber
21–22 May	Germany; Willingen	Torben Drach	Sofia Wiedenroth
29 May	Costa Rica; Heredia	Álvaro Hidalgo	Melissa Ávila
29 May	Costa Rica; Heredia	Bayron González	Katherine Herrera
29 May	Costa Rica; Heredia	Emanuel Miranda	Sofía Morales
11–12 June	Switzerland; Laax	Basil Weber	Lisa Baumann
11–12 June	Switzerland; Laax	Gustav Wildhaber	Carolin Gehrig
11–12 June	Switzerland; Laax	Tim Bratschi	Anita Gehrig
25–26 June	Norway; Drammen	Simen Smestad	Helena Nyhus
25–26 June	Norway; Drammen	Bård Pettersen	Anette Røssum Bastnes
25–26 June	Norway; Drammen	Anders Skarstein	Lene Pettersen
3 July	Bulgaria; Rhodope Mountains	Stivian Gatev	Anna Yankova
3 July	Bulgaria; Rhodope Mountains	Yordan Iliev	Alexandra Kuzova
3 July	Bulgaria; Rhodope Mountains	Yordan Donev	Veneta Zaharieva
10 July	Greece; Arachova	Grigoris Tsalafoutas	Gold medal
10 July	Greece; Arachova	Alexandros Topkaroglou	Silver medal
10 July	Greece; Arachova	Elissaios Gouvis	Bronze medal
16–18 July	Venezuela; La Guaira	Santiago Martínez Jayo	Isabella Mora Viney
16–18 July	Venezuela; La Guaira	Anthony Franchy Alvarez Guia	Yanasasha Pacheco
16–18 July	Venezuela; La Guaira	Daniel Gonzalez	Bronze medal
16–17 July	Ireland; Limerick	Gregory Callaghan	Leah Maunsell
16–17 July	Ireland; Limerick	Kelan Grant	Maeve Baxter
16–17 July	Ireland; Limerick	Gary Donaldson	Hannah Mullin
23 July	Indonesia; Banyuwangi	Teguh Adi Pratama	Risaka Agustin
23 July	Indonesia; Banyuwangi	Muhammad Ronald	Dara Latifah
23 July	Indonesia; Banyuwangi	Salman Al Parisi	Firda Nabila Nur Azizah
23–24 July	Slovenia; Hudi Kot	Vid Peršak	Tina Smrdel
23–24 July	Slovenia; Hudi Kot	Jan Štucin	Tamara Homar
23–24 July	Slovenia; Hudi Kot	Enej Podlipnik	Maja Vojska
24 July	United States; Winter Park	Richard Rude Jr.	Amy Morrison
24 July	United States; Winter Park	Mitch Ropelato	Porsha Murdock
24 July	United States; Winter Park	Jonny Brown	Kate Lawrence
26–28 August	Poland; Bielsko-Biała & Szczyrk	Damian Konstanty	Katarzyna Burek
26–28 August	Poland; Bielsko-Biała & Szczyrk	Michał Topór	Karolina Poczwardowska
26–28 August	Poland; Bielsko-Biała & Szczyrk	Olaf Oziomek	Karolina Cierluk
27 & 28 August	Austria; Oberndorf in Tirol	Daniel Schemmel	Hanna Steinthaler
27 & 28 August	Austria; Oberndorf in Tirol	Kevin Maderegger	Cornelia Holland
27 & 28 August	Austria; Oberndorf in Tirol	Peter Mihalkovits	Fiona Klien
28 August	Sweden; Östersund	Oliwer Kangas	Filippa Ring
28 August	Sweden; Östersund	Niklas Wallner	Irma Johansson
28 August	Sweden; Östersund	Daniel Swanbeck	Elina Davidsson
4 September	Italy; Castel del Rio	Tommaso Francardo	Gaia Tormena
4 September	Italy; Castel del Rio	Matteo Raimondi	Nadine Ellecosta
4 September	Italy; Castel del Rio	Mirco Vendemmia	Gloria Scarsi
4 September	Brazil; Campos do Jordão	Gold medal	Gold medal
4 September	Brazil; Campos do Jordão	Silver medal	Silver medal
4 September	Brazil; Campos do Jordão	Bronze medal	Bronze medal
11 September	Lithuania; Vilnius	Ignas Ambrazas	Gold medal
11 September	Lithuania; Vilnius	Tomas Pečiukaitis	Silver medal
11 September	Lithuania; Vilnius	Arnoldas Valiauga	Bronze medal
25 September	Chile; Rinconada	Gold medal	Gold medal
25 September	Chile; Rinconada	Silver medal	Silver medal
25 September	Chile; Rinconada	Bronze medal	Bronze medal
25 September	Slovakia; Ružomberok	Gold medal	Gold medal
25 September	Slovakia; Ružomberok	Silver medal	Silver medal
25 September	Slovakia; Ružomberok	Bronze medal	Bronze medal
15–16 October	Portugal; Castelo de Vide	Gold medal	Gold medal
15–16 October	Portugal; Castelo de Vide	Silver medal	Silver medal
15–16 October	Portugal; Castelo de Vide	Bronze medal	Bronze medal
16 October	South Africa; Mbombela	Johann Potgieter	Zandri Strydom
16 October	South Africa; Mbombela	Keira Duncan	Lilian Baber
16 October	South Africa; Mbombela	Willie van Eck	Talia Behr
16 October	Spain; La Adrada	Edgar Carballo	Sara Yusto
16 October	Spain; La Adrada	Gabriel Torralba	Sara Gay
16 October	Spain; La Adrada	Marco Veiga	Ares Masip Ibañez
22–23 October	Australia; Red Hill	(New Zealand) Hayden Stead	Jessica Hoskin
22–23 October	Australia; Red Hill	Timothy Eaton	Zoe Cuthbert
22–23 October	Australia; Red Hill	Sam Walsh	Sian A'Hern
29–30 October	Croatia; Dugi Rat	Sandi Smolić	Gold medal
29–30 October	Croatia; Dugi Rat	Fran Bošnjak	Silver medal
29–30 October	Croatia; Dugi Rat	Jakov Svilokos	Bronze medal

=== 4X ===
Date	Venue	Podium (Men)	Podium (Women)
31 July	United Kingdom; Falmouth	Connor Hudson	Josie McFall
31 July	United Kingdom; Falmouth	Duncan Ferris	Sophie Cade
31 July	United Kingdom; Falmouth	Zac Hudson	Katherine Byng

=== SNO ===
Date	Venue	Podium (Men)	Podium (Women)
22 January	Bulgaria; Vitosha	Stivian Gatev	Denitsa Tosheva
22 January	Bulgaria; Vitosha	Nikola Todorov	Veneta Zaharieva
22 January	Bulgaria; Vitosha	Nikolai Georgiev	Bronze medal
6 March	France; Pra-Loup	Pierre Thévenard	Sabrina Jonnier
6 March	France; Pra-Loup	Aurélien Giordanengo	Lucy Paltz
6 March	France; Pra-Loup	Kévyn Mayeur	Bronze medal

==== XCR ====
Date	Venue	Podium
22 July	Czech Republic; Břasy	Patrik Černý; Simona Spěšná; Tereza Tvarůžková; Robert Hula
22 July	Czech Republic; Břasy	Matěj Vik; Eliška Hanáková; Hanka Viková; Ondřej Novotný
22 July	Czech Republic; Břasy	Daniel Rubeš; Amálie Gottwaldová; Karolína Bedrníková; František Hojka
