= German National Mountain Bike Championships =

Annual cycle race in Germany

- The champion's jersey

Race details
- Region: Germany
- Discipline: Mountain biking
- Type: National championship
- Organiser: German Cycling Federation

History
- First edition: 1990

The German National Mountain Bike Championships are held annually to decide the cycling champions in the mountain biking discipline, across various categories.

== Men ==
=== Cross-country ===
| Year | Winner | Second | Third |
|---|---|---|---|
| 1990 | Jürgen Sprich | Jürgen Eckmann | Volker Krukenbaum |
| 1991 | Jürgen Sprich | Volker Krukenbaum | Uli Rottler |
| 1992 | Robert Martin | Ralph Berner | Mike Kluge |
| 1993 | Mike Kluge | Ralph Berner | Hartmut Bölts |
| 1994 | Ralph Berner | Hartmut Bölts | Mike Kluge |
| 1995 | Marc Hanisch | Carsten Bresser | Hartmut Bölts |
| 1996 | Mike Kluge | Ralph Berner | Martin Hollerbach |
| 1997 | Carsten Bresser | Mike Kluge | Martin Hollerbach |
| 1998 | Ralph Berner | Wolfram Kurschat | Axel Rein |
| 1999 | Wolfram Kurschat | Lado Fumic | Thomas Hierlwimmer |
| 2000 | Lado Fumic | Marc Hanisch | Carsten Bresser |
| 2001 | Lado Fumic | Jochen Käß | Marc Hanisch |
| 2002 | Lado Fumic | Manuel Fumic | Jochen Käß |
| 2003 | Lado Fumic | Carsten Bresser | Stefan Sahm |
| 2004 | Lado Fumic | Wolfram Kurschat | Stefan Sahm |
| 2005 | Lado Fumic | Manuel Fumic | Wolfram Kurschat |
| 2006 | Moritz Milatz | Lado Fumic | Jochen Käß |
| 2007 | Wolfram Kurschat | Manuel Fumic | Johannes Sickmüller |
| 2008 | Manuel Fumic | Moritz Milatz | Wolfram Kurschat |
| 2009 | Wolfram Kurschat | Moritz Milatz | Jochen Käß |
| 2010 | Moritz Milatz | Jochen Käß | Torsten Marx |
| 2011 | Moritz Milatz | Wolfram Kurschat | Robert Mennen |
| 2012 | Manuel Fumic | Jochen Käß | Robert Mennen |
| 2013 | Moritz Milatz | Wolfram Kurschat | Markus Schulte-Lünzum |
| 2014 | Markus Schulte-Lünzum | Manuel Fumic | Markus Bauer |
| 2015 | Manuel Fumic | Markus Schulte-Lünzum | Moritz Milatz |
| 2016 | Markus Schulte-Lünzum | Moritz Milatz | Christian Pfäffle |
| 2017 | Manuel Fumic | Simon Stiebjahn | Georg Egger |
| 2018 | Manuel Fumic | Georg Egger | Ben Zwiehoff |
| 2019 | Maximilian Brandl | Ben Zwiehoff | Markus Schulte-Lünzum |
| 2020 | Maximilian Brandl | Marcel Meisen | Manuel Fumic |
| 2021 | Manuel Fumic | Niklas Schehl | Georg Egger |

=== Cross-country eliminator ===
| Year | Winner | Second | Third |
|---|---|---|---|
| 2012 | Simon Gegenheimer | Christian Pfäffle | Andy Eyring |
| 2013 | Simon Gegenheimer | Christian Pfäffle | Andy Eyring |
| 2014 | Simon Stiebjahn | Markus Bauer | Heiko Gutmann |
| 2015 | David Horvath | Simon Stiebjahn | Felix Klausmann |
| 2016 | Simon Gegenheimer | David Horvath | Toni Partheymüller |
| 2017 | Simon Stiebjahn | David Horvath | Julian Schelb |
| 2018 | Simon Gegenheimer | David Horvath | Julian Schelb |
| 2019 | Felix Klausmann | Silas Graf | Lars Hemmerling |

=== Marathon ===
| Year | Winner | Second | Third |
|---|---|---|---|
| 2004 | Hannes Genze | Moritz Milatz | Andreas Strobel |
| 2005 | Lado Fumic | Wolfram Kurschat | Benjamin Rudiger |
| 2006 | Hannes Genze | Stefan Sahm | Thomas Nicke |
| 2007 | Jochen Käß | Tim Böhme | Torsten Marx |
| 2008 | Karl Platt | Stefan Sahm | Hannes Genze |
| 2009 | Jochen Käß | Tim Böhme | Stefan Sahm |
| 2010 | Jochen Käß | Moritz Milatz | Wolfram Kurschat |
| 2011 | Moritz Milatz | Karl Platt | Hannes Genze |
| 2012 | Markus Kaufmann | Robert Mennen | Hannes Genze |
| 2013 | Robert Mennen | Markus Bauer | Simon Stiebjahn |
| 2014 | Tim Böhme | Markus Kaufmann | Jochen Käß |
| 2015 | Karl Platt | Simon Stiebjahn | Markus Kaufmann |
| 2016 | Markus Kaufmann | Sascha Weber | Peter Hermann |
| 2017 | Markus Bauer | Simon Stiebjahn | Markus Kaufmann |
| 2018 | Julian Schelb | Markus Kaufmann | Simon Stiebjahn |
| 2019 | Sascha Weber | Julian Schelb | Simon Stiebjahn |
| 2020 | David List | Luca Schwarzbauer | Simon Schneller |

=== E-Bike Cross-country ===
| Year | Winner | Second | Third |
|---|---|---|---|
| 2020 | Jochen Käß | Sönke Wegner | Sven Baumann |

=== Downhill ===
| Year | Winner | Second | Third |
|---|---|---|---|
| 1993 | Jürgen Sprich | | Wolfgang Ebersbach |
| 1994 | Jürgen Beneke | Stefan Herrmann | Peter Stiefl |
| 1995 | Jürgen Beneke | Stefan Herrmann | Wolfgang Groß |
| 1996 | Jürgen Beneke | | |
| 1997 | Marcus Klausmann | | |
| 1998 | Marcus Klausmann | Guido Tschugg | Stefan Herrmann |
| 1999 | Marcus Klausmann | Markus Bast | Dennis Strathmann |
| 2000 | Marcus Klausmann | Markus Bast | Nathaniel Goiny |
| 2001 | Stefan Kudella | Marcus Klausmann | Frank Schneider |
| 2002 | Marcus Klausmann | Frank Schneider | Stefan Kudella |
| 2003 | Marcus Klausmann | Sascha Ehrmann | Andreas Sieber |
| 2004 | Marcus Klausmann | Frank Schneider | Andreas Sieber |
| 2005 | Marcus Klausmann | Andre Wagenknecht | David Schatzki |
| 2006 | Marcus Klausmann | Frank Schneider | Daniel Schmieder |
| 2007 | Marcus Klausmann | Andreas Sieber | Frank Schneider |
| 2008 | Andre Wagenknecht | Andreas Sieber | Benny Strasser |
| 2009 | Marcus Klausmann | Maximilian Bender | Frank Schneider |
| 2010 | Marcus Klausmann | Andreas Sieber | Joshua Hein |
| 2011 | Benny Strasser | Noah Grossmann | Andre Wagenknecht |
| 2012 | Johannes Fischbach | Benny Strasser | Andreas Sieber |
| 2013 | Marcus Klausmann | Johannes Fischbach | Christian Textor |
| 2014 | Johannes Fischbach | Janik Rebmann | Marcus Klausmann |
| 2015 | Johannes Fischbach | Jasper Jauch | Benny Strasser |
| 2016 | Julius Sauer | Silas Grandy | Johannes Fischbach |
| 2017 | Max Hartenstern | Benny Strasser | Jasper Jauch |
| 2018 | Max Hartenstern | Christian Textor | Joshua Barth |
| 2019 | Max Hartenstern | Joshua Barth | Till Ulmschneider |
| 2020 | Max Hartenstern | Hannes Lehmann | Nico Lamm |

=== Four cross ===
| Year | Winner | Second | Third |
|---|---|---|---|
| 2003 | Sascha Meyenborg | | |
| 2004 | Guido Tschugg | Thomas Schäfer | Enrico Schaumburg |
| 2005 | Thomas Schäfer | Johannes Fischbach | Gregor Alf |
| 2006 | No race | | |
| 2007 | Johannes Fischbach | Sascha Meyenborg | Sascha Baier |
| 2008 | Johannes Fischbach | Guido Tschugg | Thomas Schäfer |
| 2009 | No race | | |
| 2010 | Johannes Fischbach | Aiko Göhler | Nico Seidel |
| 2011 | Johannes Fischbach | Klaus Beige | Guido Tschugg |
| 2012 | Marko Runst | Petrik Brückner | Aiko Göhler |
| 2013 | Benedikt Last | Marc Oppermann | Aiko Göhler |
| 2015 | Johannes Fischbach | Benedikt Last | Axel Flakowski |
| 2014 | Benedikt Last | Jonas Gauss | Stefan Scherz |
| 2016 | Benedikt Last | Klaus Beige | Jonas Gauss |
| 2017 | Benedikt Last | Jonas Gauss | Klaus Beige |
| 2018 | Ingo Kaufmann | Erik Emmrich | David Horvath |
| 2019 | Benedikt Last | Klaus Beige | Erik Emmrich |

=== Enduro ===
| Year | Winner | Second | Third |
|---|---|---|---|
| 2014 | André Wagenknecht | | |
| 2015 | Fabian Scholz | | |
| 2016 | Christian Textor | | |
| 2017 | Leonhard Putzenlechner | Christian Textor | André Kleindienst |
| 2018 | Christian Textor | Leonhard Putzenlechner | Fabian Heim |
| 2019 | Christian Textor | Fabian Heim | Felix Heine |

== Women ==
=== Cross-country ===
| Year | Winner | Second | Third |
|---|---|---|---|
| 1990 | Susi Buchwieser | | |
| 1991 | Regina Stiefl | | |
| 1992 | Susi Buchwieser | | |
| 1993 | Regina Stiefl | | |
| 1994 | Maria Knust | Regina Marunde | Susanne Alfes |
| 1995 | Hanka Kupfernagel | Nora Rösch | Susanne Alfes |
| 1996 | Regina Marunde | | |
| 1997 | Regina Marunde | Nora Rösch | Hedda Zu Putlitz |
| 1998 | Hedda Zu Putlitz | Sabine Spitz | Helga Weiss |
| 1999 | Hedda Zu Putlitz | Helga Weiss | Sabine Spitz |
| 2000 | Hedda Zu Putlitz | Regina Marunde | Sabine Spitz |
| 2001 | Sabine Spitz | Katrin Schwing | Helga Weiss |
| 2002 | Sabine Spitz | Katrin Schwing | Regina Marunde |
| 2003 | Sabine Spitz | Nina Wrobel | Sandra Klose |
| 2004 | Sabine Spitz | Ivonne Kraft | Sandra Klose |
| 2005 | Sabine Spitz | Nina Wrobel | Ivonne Kraft |
| 2006 | Sabine Spitz | Nina Wrobel | Hanka Kupfernagel |
| 2007 | Hanka Kupfernagel | Sabine Spitz | Nina Wrobel |
| 2008 | Sabine Spitz | Ivonne Kraft | Adelheid Morath |
| 2009 | Sabine Spitz | Adelheid Morath | Hanna Klein |
| 2010 | Sabine Spitz | Anja Gradl | Hanna Klein |
| 2011 | Sabine Spitz | Elisabeth Brandau | Adelheid Morath |
| 2012 | Sabine Spitz | Adelheid Morath | Silke Schmidt |
| 2013 | Sabine Spitz | Elisabeth Brandau | Silke Schmidt |
| 2014 | Adelheid Morath | Sabine Spitz | Helen Grobert |
| 2015 | Helen Grobert | Hanna Klein | Adelheid Morath |
| 2016 | Sabine Spitz | Helen Grobert | Elisabeth Brandau |
| 2017 | Sabine Spitz | Helen Grobert | Adelheid Morath |
| 2018 | Elisabeth Brandau | Adelheid Morath | Nadine Rieder |
| 2019 | Elisabeth Brandau | Antonia Daubermann | Adelheid Morath |
| 2020 | Elisabeth Brandau | Nadine Rieder | Antonia Daubermann |
| 2021 | Leonie Daubermann | Ronja Eibl | Nina Benz |

=== Cross-country eliminator ===
| Year | Winner | Second | Third |
|---|---|---|---|
| 2012 | Elisabeth Brandau | Veronika Brüchle | Helen Grobert |
| 2013 | Veronika Brüchle | Saskia Hauser | Nadine Rieder |
| 2014 | Sabine Spitz | Lena Putz | Nadine Rieder |
| 2015 | Nadine Rieder | Majlen Müller | Hannah Grobert |
| 2016 | Nadine Rieder | Lena Putz | Lena Wehrle |
| 2017 | Clara Brehm | Lena Putz | Susann Frey |
| 2018 | Lia Schrievers | Marion Fromberger | Nadine Rieder |
| 2019 | Lia Schrievers | Nadine Rieder | Kim Ames |

=== Marathon ===
| Year | Winner | Second | Third |
|---|---|---|---|
| 2004 | Sabine Spitz | Alexandra Rosenstiel | Katrin Helmcke |
| 2005 | Sabine Spitz | Nina Wrobel | Adelheid Morath |
| 2006 | Nina Wrobel | Sabine Spitz | Adelheid Morath |
| 2007 | Katrin Schwing | Adelheid Morath | Kerstin Brachtendorf |
| 2008 | Elisabeth Brandau | Adelheid Morath | Anja Gradl |
| 2009 | Adelheid Morath | Barbara Kaltenhauser | Ivonne Kraft |
| 2010 | Sabine Spitz | Birgit Söllner | Ivonne Kraft |
| 2011 | Elisabeth Brandau | Mailin Franke | Nina Gäßler |
| 2012 | Elisabeth Brandau | Silke Schmidt | Birgit Söllner |
| 2013 | Silke Schmidt | Sabine Spitz | Elisabeth Brandau |
| 2014 | Silke Schmidt | Hanna Klein | Katrin Schwing |
| 2015 | Sabine Spitz | Silke Schmidt | Elisabeth Brandau |
| 2016 | Silke Schmidt | Stefanie Dohrn | Bettina Janas |
| 2017 | Silke Ulrich | Elisabeth Brandau | Stefanie Dohrn |
| 2018 | Sabine Spitz | Silke Ulrich | Kim Anika Ames |
| 2019 | Janine Schneider | Nadine Rieder | Sabine Spitz |
| 2020 | Nadine Rieder | Leonie Daubermann | Laura Philipp |

=== E-Bike Cross-country ===
| Year | Winner | Second | Third |
|---|---|---|---|
| 2020 | Alina Bähr | Janina Baumann | Ariane Blaschzyk |

=== Downhill ===
| Year | Winner | Second | Third |
|---|---|---|---|
| 1993 | Regina Marunde | | |
| 1994 | Regina Stiefl | Laura Burckhard | Petra Winterhalder |
| 1995 | Regina Stiefl | Britta Kobes | Tanja Nehme |
| 1998 | Regina Stiefl | Maren Jüllich | Petra Winterhalder |
| 1999 | Maren Jüllich | Petra Winterhalder | Regina Stiefl |
| 2000 | Britta Kobes | Maren Jüllich | Christiane Rumpf |
| 2001 | Christiane Rumpf | Sonja Granzow | Anja Jerenko |
| 2002 | Sonja Granzow | Christiane Rumpf | Anja Jerenko |
| 2003 | Antje Kramer | Christiane Rumpf | Sonja Granzow |
| 2004 | Antje Kramer | Christiane Rumpf | Isabell Weiß |
| 2005 | Antje Kramer | Luise Siegfried | Christiane Rumpf |
| 2006 | Antje Kramer | Harriet Rücknagel | Regine Ullrich |
| 2007 | Antje Kramer | Harriet Rücknagel | Sandra Rübesam |
| 2008 | Antje Kramer | Harriet Rücknagel | Sandra Rübesam |
| 2009 | Antje Kramer | Harriet Rücknagel | Nicole Beege |
| 2010 | Harriet Rücknagel | Sandra Rübesam | Nicole Beege |
| 2011 | Harriet Rücknagel | Nicole Beege | Sandra Rübesam |
| 2012 | Harriet Rücknagel | Nicole Beege | Sandra Rübesam |
| 2013 | Harriet Rücknagel | Kim Schwemmer | Sandra Rübesam |
| 2014 | Harriet Rücknagel | Nicole Beege | Steffi Marth |
| 2015 | Sandra Rübesam | Maria Franke | Katrin Karkhof |
| 2016 | Sandra Rübesam | Kim Schwemmer | Harriet Rücknagel |
| 2017 | Raphaela Richter | Sandra Rübesam | Nina Charlotte Hoffmann |
| 2018 | Nina Charlotte Hoffmann | Raphaela Richter | Sandra Rübesam |
| 2019 | Raphaela Richter | Sandra Rübesam | Katrin Stohr |
| 2020 | Nina Hoffmann | Sandra Rübesam | Justine Welzel |

=== Four cross ===
| Year | Winner | Second | Third |
|---|---|---|---|
| 2007 | Sonja Granzow | | |
| 2008 | Steffi Marth | Laura Brethauer | Sonja Granzow |
| 2009 | No race | | |
| 2010 | Steffi Marth | Laura Brethauer | Dana Elena Schweika |
| 2011 | Steffi Marth | Laura Brethauer | Anna Börschig |
| 2012 | Steffi Marth | Laura Brethauer | Anna Börschig |
| 2013 | Laura Brethauer | Tanja Hendrysiak | Anna Börschig |
| 2014 | Laura Brethauer | Lisa Schaub | Julia Lackas |
| 2015 | Katrin Karkhof | Julia Lackas | Jessica Schmulbach |
| 2016 | Franziska Meyer | Jessica Schmulbach | Katrin Karkhof |
| 2017 | Franziska Meyer | Jessica Schmulbach | Amelia Mauz |
| 2018 | Steffi Marth | Franziska Meyer | Raphaela Richter |
| 2019 | Raphaela Richter | Laura Küderle | Nicol Schwadke |

=== Enduro ===
| Year | Winner | Second | Third |
|---|---|---|---|
| 2014 | Ines Thoma | | |
| 2015 | Franziska Meyer | | |
| 2016 | Raphaela Richter | Sandra Rübesam | Veronika Brüchle |
| 2017 | Raphaela Richter | Ines Thoma | Veronika Brüchle |
| 2018 | Raphaela Richter | Sofia Wiedenroth | Veronika Brüchle |
| 2019 | Raphaela Richter | Ines Thoma | Sofia Wiedenroth |

== See also ==
- German National Road Race Championships
- German National Time Trial Championships
- German National Cyclo-cross Championships
