= German National Cyclo-cross Championships =

- The champion's jersey

Race details
- Region: Germany
- Discipline: Cyclo-cross
- Type: National championship
- Organiser: German Cycling Federation

History
- First edition: 1954

The German National Cyclo-cross Championships are held annually to decide the cycling champions in the cyclo-cross discipline, across various categories.

== Men ==
=== Elite ===
Year	Winner	Second	Third
1954	Emil Reinecke	Hardy Bingen	Arthur Scherer
1955	Herbert Ebbers	Walter Becker	Hans Brinkmann
1956	Albert Rinn	Norbert Psarski	Heinz Steinzen
1957	Guenther Debussmann	Rolf Wolfshohl	Heinrich Ruffenach
1958	Rolf Wolfshohl	Lothar Friedrich	Guenther Debussmann
1959	Rolf Wolfshohl	Lothar Friedrich	Guenther Debussmann
1960	Rolf Wolfshohl	Guenther Debussmann	Herbert Ebbers
1961	Rolf Wolfshohl	Dieter Puschel	Klaus Ehrenberg
1962	Rolf Wolfshohl	Franz Allgaier	Gerhard Schröder
1963	Rolf Wolfshohl	Franz Allgaier	Gerhard Schröder
1964	Günther Weiss	Heinrich Ruffenach	Manfred Rupflin
1965	Rolf Wolfshohl	Winfried Gottschalk	Franz Allgaier
1966	Rolf Wolfshohl	Karl Stähle	Dietmar Allgaier
1967	Rolf Wolfshohl	Winfried Gottschalk	Jürgen Schlitzkus
1968	Rolf Wolfshohl	Winfried Gottschalk	Karl Stähle
1969	Rolf Wolfshohl	Günther Weiss	Karl-Heinz Kunde
1970	Rolf Wolfshohl	Günther Weiss	Horst Maier
1972	Rolf Wolfshohl	Karl-Heinz Kunde	Dieter Puschel
1973	Rolf Wolfshohl	Alfred Gaida	Karl-Heinz Küster
1977	Klaus-Peter Thaler	Willy Singer	Horst Maier
1978	Klaus-Peter Thaler	Jürgen Kraft	Willy Singer
1979	Klaus-Peter Thaler	Horst Maier	Karl-Heinz Bohnen
1980	Klaus-Peter Thaler	Rolf Haller	Klaus Thurn
1981	Klaus-Peter Thaler	Erwin Gaede	Dieter Warbel
1982	Klaus-Peter Thaler	Raimund Dietzen	Dieter Uebing
1983	Dieter Uebing	Erwin Gaede	
1984	Raimund Dietzen	Dieter Uebing	Rudi Weber
1985	Raimund Dietzen	Klaus-Peter Thaler	Dieter Uebing
1986	Klaus-Peter Thaler	Dieter Uebing	Harry Schmitz
1987	Klaus-Peter Thaler	Volker Krukenbaum	Dieter Uebing
1988	Klaus-Peter Thaler	Dieter Uebing	Volker Krukenbaum
1989	Mike Kluge	Volker Krukenbaum	Josef Meisen
1990	Mike Kluge	Volker Krukenbaum	Josef Holzmann
1991	Mike Kluge	Josef Holzmann	
1992	Mike Kluge	Georg Bickel	Volker Krukenbaum
1993	Mike Kluge	Volker Krukenbaum	
1994	Ralph Berner	Jens Schwedler	Jörg Paffrath
1995	Fritz Seeberger	Jörg Arenz	Torsten Wittig
1996	Mike Kluge	Ralph Berner	Jens Schwedler
1997	Franz-Josef Nieberding	Tobias Nestle	Martin Weichert
1998	Jörg Arenz	Malte Urban	Franz-Josef Nieberding
1999	Jörg Arenz	Mark Eberhard	Malte Urban
2000	Malte Urban	Ralph Berner	Jörg Arenz
2001	Tobias Nestle	Ralph Berner	Marc-Timo Weichert
2002	Jens Schwedler	Tobias Nestle	Jens Reuker
2003	Jens Reuker	Maik Müller	Jens Schwedler
2004	Malte Urban	Jens Schwedler	Reto Matt
2005	Jens Schwedler	Johannes Sickmüller	Reto Matt
2006	Johannes Sickmüller	Malte Urban	Franz-Josef Nieberding
2007	Rene Birkenfeld	Johannes Sickmüller	Thorsten Struch
2008	Malte Urban	Johannes Sickmüller	Rene Birkenfeld
2009	Philipp Walsleben	Rene Birkenfeld	Paul Voß
2010	Philipp Walsleben	Christoph Pfingsten	Paul Voß
2011	Philipp Walsleben	Christoph Pfingsten	Hannes Genze
2012	Christoph Pfingsten	Philipp Walsleben	Marcel Meisen
2013	Philipp Walsleben	Marcel Meisen	Christoph Pfingsten
2014	Philipp Walsleben	Marcel Meisen	Sascha Weber
2015	Marcel Meisen	Sascha Weber	Philipp Walsleben
2016	Philipp Walsleben	Sascha Weber	Marcel Meisen
2017	Marcel Meisen	Sascha Weber	Philipp Walsleben
2018	Marcel Meisen	Sascha Weber	Manuel Müller
2019	Marcel Meisen	Manuel Müller	Sascha Weber
2020	Marcel Meisen	Sascha Weber	Manuel Müller
2021	Marcel Meisen	Manuel Müller	Florenz Knauer
2022	Marcel Meisen	Jannick Geisler	Yannick Gruner

=== Under-23 ===
Year	Winner	Second	Third
1998	Stefan Kupfernagel		
1999	Steffen Weigold		
2000	Steffen Weigold		
2001	Hannes Genze		
2002	Leo Karstens		
2003	Thorsten Struch		
2004	Thorsten Struch		
2005	Finn Heitmann		
2006	Thorsten Struch		
2007	Philipp Walsleben		
2008	Marcel Meisen		
2009	Sascha Weber	Marcel Meisen	Ole Quast
2010	Sascha Weber	Marcel Meisen	Fabian Danner
2011	Ole Quast	Marcel Meisen	Max Walsleben
2012	Michael Schweizer	Yannick Mayer	Yannick Eckmann
2013	Markus Schulte-Lünzum	Jannick Geisler	Silvio Herklotz
2014	Felix Drumm	Julian Schelb	Yannick Gruner
2015	Felix Drumm	Yannick Gruner	Silvio Herklotz
2016	Felix Drumm	Max Lindenau	Yannick Gruner
2017	Lukas Baum	Lukas Meiler	Manuel Müller
2018	Maximilian Möbis	Frederik Hähnel	Paul Lindenau
2019	Luca Bockelmann	Pascal Tömke	Poul Rudolph
2020	Tom Lindner	Maximilian Möbis	Maximilian Krüger
2021	Pascal Tömke	Tim Wollenberg	Florian Hamm
2022	Pascal Tömke	Fabian Eder	Jasper Levi Pahlke

=== Junior ===
- 1991 : Christian Müller
- 1996 : Karsten Worner
- 1997 : Torsten Hiekmann
- 1998 : Tilo Schüler
- 1999 : Hannes Genze
- 2000 : Sven Haussler
- 2001 : Thorsten Struch
- 2002 : Felix Gniot
- 2003 : Benjamin Hill
- 2004 : Paul Voß
- 2005 : Philipp Walsleben
- 2007 : Ole Quast
- 2008 : Fabian Danner
- 2009 : Michael Schweizer
- 2010 : Jannick Geisler
- 2011 : Silvio Herklotz
- 2012 : Silvio Herklotz
- 2013 : Marco König
- 2014 : Ludwig Cords
- 2015 : Ludwig Cords
- 2016 : Maximilian Möbis
- 2017 : Niklas Märkl
- 2018 : Tom Lindner
- 2019 : Tom Lindner
- 2020 : Marco Brenner
- 2021 : Fabian Eder
- 2022 : Silas Kuschla

== Women ==
=== Elite ===
Year	Winner	Second	Third
2000	Hanka Kupfernagel	Ann Grande-Knapp	Regina Marunde
2001	Hanka Kupfernagel	Nicole Kampeter-Kottkamp	Irene Pfab
2002	Hanka Kupfernagel	Birgit Hollmann	Agnes Morath
2003	Birgit Hollmann	Hanka Kupfernagel	Regina Marunde
2004	Hanka Kupfernagel	Birgit Hollmann	Katrin Helmcke
2005	Hanka Kupfernagel	Sabine Spitz	Nicole Kampeter-Kottkamp
2006	Hanka Kupfernagel	Birgit Hollmann	Nicole Kampeter-Kottkamp
2007	Hanka Kupfernagel	Birgit Hollmann	Susanne Juranek
2008	Hanka Kupfernagel	Stephanie Pohl	Birgit Hollmann
2009	Hanka Kupfernagel	Sabrina Schweizer	Claudia Seidel
2010	Hanka Kupfernagel	Elisabeth Brandau	Martina Zwick
2011	Hanka Kupfernagel	Sabine Spitz	Sabrina Schweizer
2012	Hanka Kupfernagel	Trixi Worrack	Sabrina Schweizer
2013	Trixi Worrack	Sabrina Schweizer	Lisa Heckmann
2014	Hanka Kupfernagel	Elisabeth Brandau	Lisa Heckmann
2015	Jessica Lambracht	Lisa Heckmann	Sabine Spitz
2016	Elisabeth Brandau	Jessica Lambracht	Lisa Heckmann
2017	Jessica Lambracht	Stefanie Paul	Lisa Heckmann
2018	Elisabeth Brandau	Jessica Walsleben	Luisa Beck
2019	Elisabeth Brandau	Hanka Kupfernagel	Stefanie Paul
2020	Elisabeth Brandau	Kim Anika Ames	Stefanie Paul
2021	Elisabeth Brandau	Caroline Schiff	Lisa Heckmann
2022	Elisabeth Brandau	Lisa Heckmann	Stefanie Paul

=== Under-23 ===
Year	Winner	Second	Third
2017	Larissa Luttuschka	Lucille Rutsch	Nina Küderle
2018	Nina Küderle	Emma Eydt	Katharina-Julia Hinz
2019	Emma Eydt	Larissa Luttuschka	Clea Seidel
2020	Judith Krahl	Emma Eydt	Nina Küderle
2021	Judith Krahl	Clea Seidel	Sunny-Angelina Geschwender
2022	Judith Krahl	Clea Seidel	Sina Van Thiel

=== Junior ===
Year	Winner	Second	Third
2020	Clea Seidel	Sunny-Angelina Gschwender	Johanna Theobald
2021	Sina Van Thiel	Isabel Kämpfert	Marla Sigmund
2022	Jule Märkl	Miriam Zeise	Janika Maira Lode

== See also ==
- German National Road Race Championships
- German National Time Trial Championships
- German National Mountain Bike Championships
