= Rás na mBan =

Race details
- Date: September
- Region: Kilkenny, Ireland
- English name: The Women's Race
- Discipline: Road race
- Competition: Cycling Ireland
- Type: Stage Race
- Organiser: Rás na mBan Organising Committee
- Race director: Valerie Considine

History
- First edition: 2006
- Editions: 18
- First winner: Stefanie Gronow (GER)
- Most wins: Olivia Dillon (IRL) (3 wins)
- Most recent: Mia Griffin (IRL)

Rás na mBan is an international stage cycle road race for women in Ireland.

It was first run in 2006 and has run annually since.

The event began as a two-day race based in Dublin and became a three-day event in 2008 when it moved to a new base in Sneem, County Kerry.

A further two days were added in 2011 when it became a five-day race with six stages. The race was based in County Clare from 2013 to 2015. The race then moved to Kilkenny in 2016.

The first winner was Stefanie Gronow of Germany and many notable world championship, Olympic and professional riders have competed with distinction in Rás na mBan including the 2017 winner, Olympic Team Pursuit champion Elinor Barker, the US professional star and 2014 Rás winner Tayler Wiles and 2016 World Road Race Champion and former Rás na mBan Queen of the Mountains Amalie Dideriksen.

== History ==
Rás na mBan began in 2006 as a replacement for a previous two-day international event run by Dublin Wheelers Cycling Club.

The event was promoted by the Women's Commission of Cycling Ireland with Valerie Considine and Louis Moriarty organising the event. Since 2013 the event has been run by the Rás na mBan organising committee chaired by Considine.

The name 'Rás na mBan' means 'Women's Race' in the Irish language and is pronounced Raws na Mon.

== Winners ==
| Year | Winner | Second | Third |
|---|---|---|---|
| 2006 | Stefanie Gronow (GER) | Louise Moriarty (IRL) | Anna Harkowski (POL) |
| 2007 | Marit Huisman (NED) | Desiree Schuler (GER) | Annika Werheit (GER) |
| 2008 | Louise Moriarty (IRL) | Anne DeWildt (NED) | Jenny McCauley (IRL) |
| 2009 | Emma Trott (ENG) | Anne DeWildt (NED) | Debby Van Den Berg (NED) |
| 2010 | Olivia Dillon (IRL) | Alli Holland (ENG) | Natalie Creswick (ENG) |
| 2011 | Olivia Dillon (IRL) | Melanie Spath (IRL) | Linda Poelstra Ringlever (NED) |
| 2012 | Kamilla Vallin (DEN) | Lydia Boylan (IRL) | Lowri Devey (WAL) |
| 2013 | Olivia Dillon (IRL) | Melanie Spath (IRL) | Christine Majerus (LUX) |
| 2014 | Tayler Wiles (USA) | Anne Ewing (SCO) | Molly Weaver (ENG) |
| 2015 | Stephanie Pohl (GER) | Eileen Roe (SCO) | Emma Norsgaard Jorgensen (DEN) |
| 2016 | Rikke Lønne (DEN) | Lydia Boylan (IRL) | Marieke Kerkvliet (NED) |
| 2017 | Elinor Barker (WAL) | Alexandra Nessmar (SWE) | Natalie Grinczer (ENG) |
| 2018 | Coralie Demay (FRA) | Nicola Juniper (ENG) | Rikke Lønne (DEN) |
| 2019 | Claire Steels (ENG) | Josie Knight (ENG) | Anna Shackley (SCO) |
| 2021 | Anna Shackley (SCO) | Abi Smith (SCO) | Loes Adegeest (NED) |
| 2022 | Kate Richardson (SCO) | Lieke van Zeelst (NED) | Becky Storie (ENG) |
| 2023 | Manon de Boer (NED) | Renee van Hout (NED) | Tiffany Keep (ZAF) |
| 2024 | Mia Griffin (IRL) | Noor Dekker (NED) | Manon de Boer (NED) |
