= 2014 UCI Mountain Bike & Trials World Championships – Men's junior cross-country =

== Results ==
#	Cyclist	Nation		Time
1	Simon Andreassen	Denmark	in	1 h 08 min 49 s
2	Egan Bernal	Colombia	+	37 s
3	Luca Schwarzbauer	Germany		38 s
4	Milan Vader	Netherlands		1 min 19 s
5	David Horvath	Germany		2 min 30 s
6	Hugo Briatta	France		2 min 48 s
7	Neilo Perrin Ganier	France		3 min 53 s
8	Neilson Powless	United States		3 min 55 s
9	Moreno Pellizzon	Italy		3 min 56 s
10	Filippo Colombo	Switzerland		4 min 02 s
11	David Ashby-Coventry	New Zealand		4 min 16 s
12	Marc Andre Fortier	Canada		4 min 22 s
13	Erik Nordsaeter Resell	Norway		4 min 26 s
14	Hugo Pigeon	France		4 min 29 s
15	Wout Alleman	Belgium		4 min 40 s
16	Jan Rajchart	Czech Republic		4 min 43 s
17	Maximilian Brandl	Germany		4 min 47 s
18	Niels Derveaux	Belgium		4 min 50 s
19	Matej Prudek	Czech Republic		4 min 55 s
20	Alessandro Naspi	Italy		4 min 55 s
21	Antoine Philipp	France		5 min 25 s
22	Stanislav Antonov	Russia		5 min 48 s
23	Noah Bloechlinger	Switzerland		5 min 57 s
24	Felix Ritzinger	Austria		6 min 05 s
25	Thomas Craig	Great Britain		6 min 14 s
26	Lucas Dubau	France		6 min 31 s
27	Arsenty Vavilov	Russia		6 min 40 s
28	Dylan Kerfoot-Robson	Great Britain		6 min 50 s
29	Marceli Boguslawski	Poland		6 min 57 s
30	Joshua Dubau	France		6 min 58 s
31	Frazer Clacherty	Great Britain		7 min 03 s
32	Erik Haegstad	Norway		7 min 22 s
33	Robin Hofmann	Germany		7 min 36 s
34	Pierre De Froidmont	Belgium		7 min 50 s
35	Jack Compton	New Zealand		8 min 02 s
36	Matej Ulik	Slovakia		8 min 36 s
37	Max Wiklund-Hellstadius	Sweden		8 min 39 s
38	Mitchell Greenway	Australia		8 min 45 s
39	Rok Naglic	Slovenia		8 min 59 s
40	Jose Gerardo Ulloa	Mexico		9 min 06 s
41	Rhys Verner	Canada		9 min 09 s
42	Eirik Pettersen	Norway		9 min 27 s
43	Jonas Lindberg	Denmark		9 min 33 s
44	Nikolay Melnikov	Russia		9 min 41 s
45	Manuel Cid De La Paz	Argentina		9 min 45 s
46	Garrett Gerchar	United States		9 min 45 s
47	Sigurd Salberg Pedersen	Norway		9 min 55 s
48	Martin Setterberg	Sweden		10 min 05 s
49	Petter Fagerhaug	Norway		10 min 13 s
50	Guy Leshem	Israel		10 min 23 s
51	Dmitry Aleksandrov	Russia		10 min 42 s
52	José Rodriguez Victoria	Mexico		10 min 46 s
53	Felix Belhumeur	Canada		10 min 52 s
54	Jozsef Krisztian Kadi	Hungary		11 min 03 s
55	Thibault Daniel	France		11 min 12 s
56	Alan Hatherly	South Africa		11 min 18 s
57	Filip Sklenarik	Slovakia		11 min 27 s
58	Landen Beckner	United States		11 min 33 s
59	Anders Bregnhoj	Denmark		13 min 37 s
60	Juan Jose Rincon	Colombia		37 min 17 s
61	Joris Nieuwenhuis	Netherlands		1 tour
62	Rodrigo Serafin	Portugal		1 tour
63	Reece Tucknott	Australia		1 tour
64	Marton Dina	Hungary		1 tour
65	Marius Grondahl Andresen	Norway		1 tour
66	Zsombor Palumby	Hungary		1 tour
67	Carson Beckett	United States		1 tour
68	Nick Van Pol	Belgium		1 tour
69	Felix Burke	Canada		1 tour
70	Guillaume Larose-Gingras	Canada		1 tour
71	Ainur Akhmetov	Russia		1 tour
72	Javier Jimenez Pascual	Spain		1 tour
73	Luke Brame	Australia		1 tour
74	Masaki Yamada	Japan		1 tour
75	Kirill Smirnov	Russia		1 tour
76	Gonzalo Artal Lokman	Argentina		1 tour
77	Felix Smalley	Australia		1 tour
78	Tomass Iljenko	Latvia		2 tours
79	Rodrigo Navarro	Argentina		2 tours
80	Robin Thyrstedt	Sweden		2 tours
81	Yunus Emre Yilmaz	Turkey		2 tours
82	Daniel Dina	Hungary		2 tours
83	Ben Oliver	New Zealand		2 tours
84	José Martinez Ronconi	Argentina		2 tours
85	Kostiantyn Prykhodko	Ukraine		2 tours
86	Tobias Eise	Germany		2 tours
87	Sandro Trevisani	Switzerland		3 tours
88	Kirill Tarassov	Estonia		3 tours
	Peter Zupancic	Slovenia		abandon
	Sasu Halme	Finland		abandon
	Leonardo Aparecido Cruvinel	Brazil		abandon
	Gareth Cannon	New Zealand		abandon
	Hans Kristian Rudland	Norway		abandon
	Ramon Lauener	Switzerland		abandon
	Michael Potter	Australia		abandon
	Sean Bennett	United States		abandon
	Roman Lehky	Czech Republic		abandon
	Tristan De Lange	Namibia		did not start
	Ari Hirabayashi	Japan		did not start
