= 1992 UCI Cyclo-cross World Championships =

Cyclo-cross championship

- Event poster

- Venue: Leeds, United Kingdom
- Date: 1–2 February 1992
- Coordinates: 53°47′51″N 01°32′37″W
- Cyclists participating: 30 (Elite); 55 (Amateurs), 42 (Juniors)
- Events: 3

The 1992 UCI Cyclo-cross World Championships were held in Leeds, United Kingdom on 1 and 2 February 1992. It was the 43rd edition of the UCI Cyclo-cross World Championships.

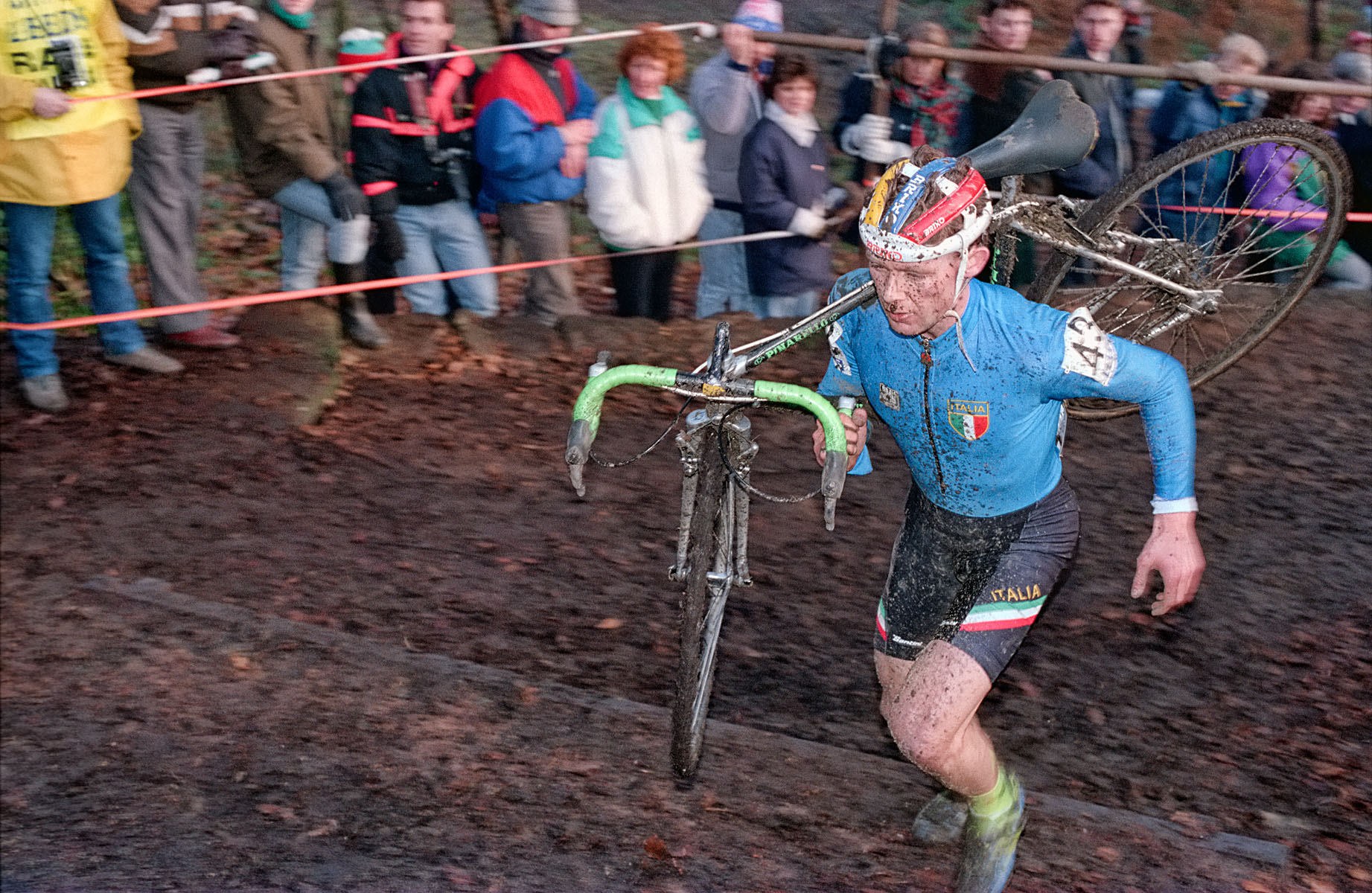
Daniele Pontoni on his way to victory in the amateurs race

== Men's Elite results ==
RANK	NAME	TIME
Gold medal	Mike Kluge (GER)	1:04:36
Silver medal	Karel Camrda (CZE)	+ 0:08
Bronze medal	Adrie van der Poel (NED)	+ 0:53
4.	Beat Wabel (SUI)	+ 0:55
5.	Radomír Šimůnek (CZE)	+ 1:20
6.	Beat Breu (SUI)	+ 1:23
7.	Karl Kälin (SUI)	+ 1:32
8.	Miloslav Kvasnička (CZE)	+ 1:33
9.	David Baker (GBR)	+ 1:40
10.	Danny De Bie (BEL)	+ 1:44

== Men's Amateurs results ==
RANK	NAME	TIME
Gold medal	Daniele Pontoni (ITA)	50:56
Silver medal	Dieter Runkel (SUI)	+ 0:46
Bronze medal	Thomas Frischknecht (SUI)	+ 1:06
4.	Emmanuel Magnien (FRA)	+ 1:11
5.	Andreas Hubmann (SUI)	+ 1:13
6.	Andreas Büsser (SUI)	+ 1:38
7.	Pavel Elsnic (CZE)	s.t.
8.	Ralph Berner (GER)	+ 1:45
9.	Jörg Arenz (GER)	+ 2:00
10.	Radovan Fořt (CZE)	+ 2:07

== Men's Juniors results ==
RANK	NAME	TIME
Gold medal	Roger Hammond (GBR)	38:10
Silver medal	Vojtěch Bachleda (CZE)	+ 0:21
Bronze medal	Jan Faltýnek (CZE)	+ 0:50
4.	Tomasz Bukowski (POL)	+ 0:56
5.	Malte Urban (GER)	+ 1:01
6.	Pascal Perrin (FRA)	+ 1:10
7.	Rolf Verhaegen (BEL)	+ 1:12
8.	Markus Zberg (SUI)	+ 1:23
9.	Jérôme Delbove (FRA)	+ 1:31
10.	Martin Elsnic (CZE)	+ 1:37
