= Sebastian Schwager =

German former road racing cyclist (born 1984)

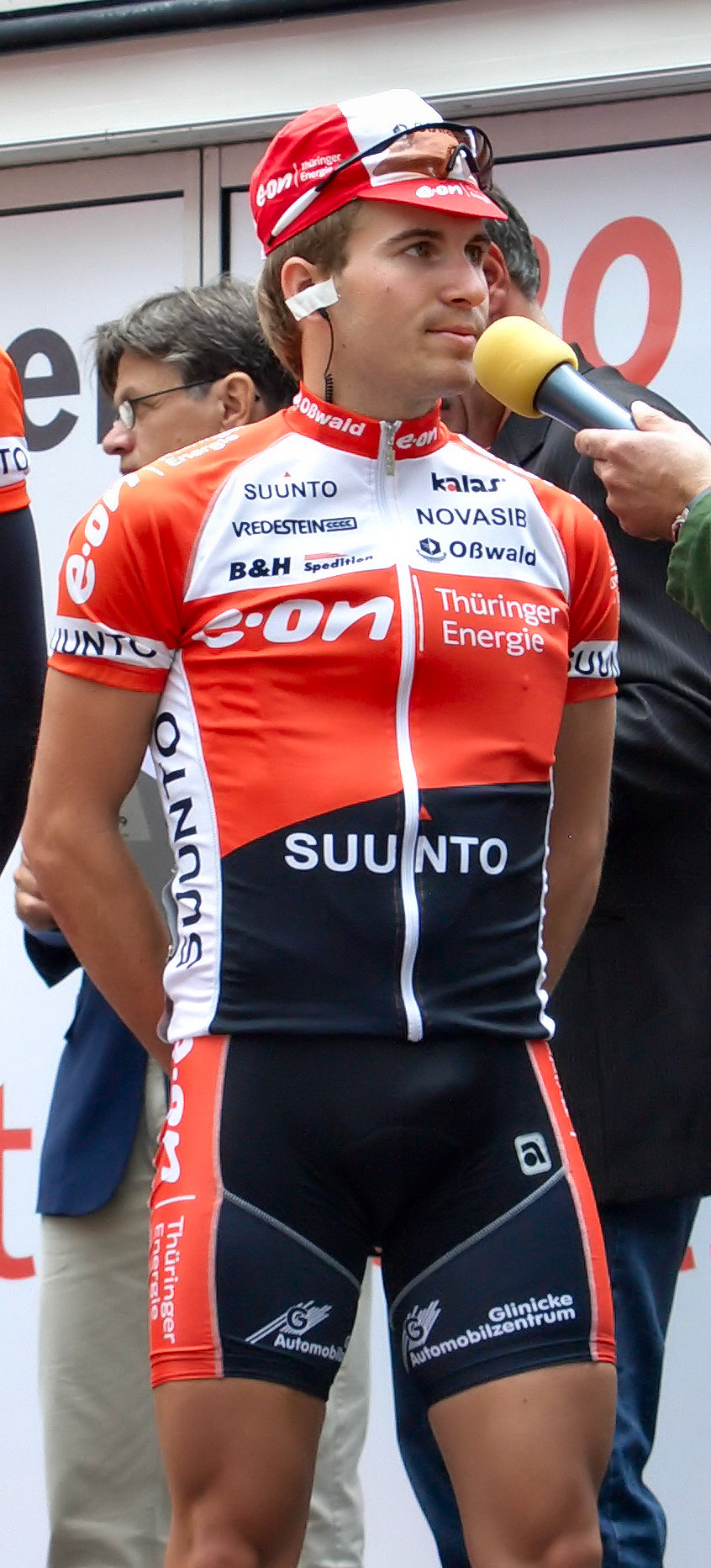

Personal information
- Full name: Sebastian Schwager
- Born: 4 January 1984 (age 42) Ansbach, Germany

Cycling career
- Sport: Cycling
- Discipline: Road
- Role: Rider

Professional teams
- 2006: Thüringer Energie Team
- 2007–2008: Team Milram

Major wins
- International Mainfranken-Tour (2006)

Sebastian Schwager (born 4 January 1984) is a German former road racing cyclist. He rode for Thüringer Energie Team in 2006 and Team Milram in 2007 and 2008.

== Career ==
Schwager, from Ansbach, won the opening stage of the 2006 International Mainfranken-Tour for Thüringer Energie Team, ahead of Christoph Pfingsten and Tony Martin. He retained the race lead through the final stage and won the general classification by eleven seconds over Pfingsten, with Martin third overall.

In June 2005, Schwager won the road race at the German under-23 championships in Wörth an der Donau, sprinting from a three-rider breakaway ahead of Alexander Gottfried and Robert Bengsch.

In August 2006, Team Milram signed Schwager to a two-year contract beginning with the 2007 season. Cyclingnews described him as a neo-professional and noted that he had won the German under-23 road title in 2005 and finished third in the same event in 2006.

In 2008, Schwager rode the Bayern Rundfahrt for Milram as a local rider from Ansbach and Neusäß. Later that year, he finished the 2008 Vuelta a España in 115th place for Team Milram. After Milram did not renew his contract, Schwager discussed his uncertain future in a December 2008 interview with Radsport-News.

== Major results ==
2005

- 1st Road race, German National Under-23 Road Championships

2006

- 1st Overall International Mainfranken-Tour
  - 1st Stage 1
- 3rd Road race, German National Under-23 Road Championships
