= Wolfram Kurschat =

German professional mountain biker (born 1975)

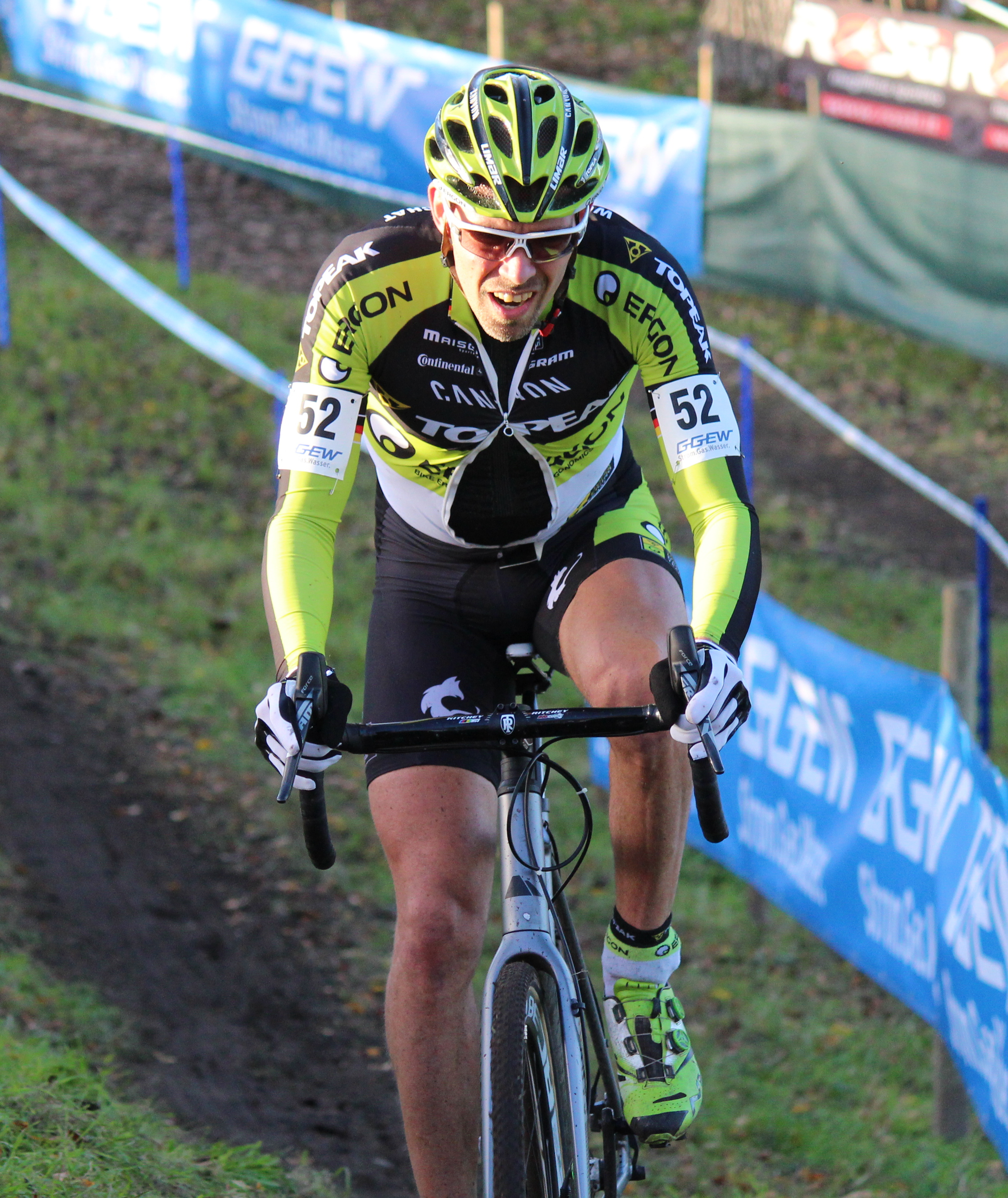

Personal information
- Full name: Wolfram Kurschat
- Nickname: Wolfman
- Born: 17 May 1975 (age 51) Werne, North Rhine-Westphalia, West Germany
- Height: 1.81 m (5 ft 11 1/2 in)
- Weight: 75 kg (165 lb)

Cycling career
- Sport: Cycling
- Current team: Topeak-Ergon Racing Team
- Discipline: Mountain biking
- Role: Rider
- Rider type: Cross-country

Professional team
- 2008–: Topeak-Ergon Racing Team

Wolfram Kurschat (born 17 May 1975 in Werne, North Rhine-Westphalia) is a German professional mountain biker. He has claimed two German national championship titles each in men's cross-country and marathon races (2007 and 2013), and later represented his nation Germany at the 2008 Summer Olympics. Kurschat currently trains and races for the 2013 season on Topeak-Ergon Racing Team, since he turned himself professional on the international scene in 2008.

Kurschat qualified for the German squad, along with his teammates Manuel Fumic and Moritz Milatz, in the men's cross-country race at the 2008 Summer Olympics in Beijing, by finishing third from the German Championships and by receiving one of the nation's three available berths from the German Cycling Federation (German: Bund Deutscher Radfahrer, BDR) and the Union Cycliste Internationale (UCI), based on his best performance at the World Cup series, World and European Championships, and Mountain Biking World Series. Kurschat could not upgrade a much stellar ride to complete a 4.8-km cross-country race course, as he decided to pull himself off from the race with only two laps left and a thirty-third-place effort because of bike problems.

== Career achievements ==
2004
2nd German MTB Championships (Cross-country), Germany
2005
3rd German MTB Championships (Cross-country), Albstadt (GER)
2007
1st German MTB Championships (Cross-country), Germany
1st Cyprus Mountain Bike Cup, Larnaca (CYP)
8th Stage 5, UCI World Cup (Cross-country), Saint-Félicien, Quebec (CAN)
29th UCI World Championships (Cross-country), Fort William (GBR)
2008
1st German MTB Championships (Marathon), Germany
3rd German MTB Championships (Cross-country), Germany
33rd Olympic Games (Cross-country), Beijing (CHN)
2009
1st German MTB Championships (Cross-country), Germany
(silver) Stage 2, UCI World Cup (Cross-country), Offenburg (GER)
(silver) Stage 3, UCI World Cup (Cross-country), Houffalize (BEL)
5th Stage 1, UCI World Cup (Cross-country), Pietermaritzburg (RSA)
10th Stage 8, UCI World Cup (Cross-country), Schladming (AUT)
12th Stage 4, UCI World Cup (Cross-country), Madrid (ESP)
2010
2nd German MTB Championships (Cross-country), Albstadt (GER)
(bronze) Stage 2, UCI World Cup (Cross-country), Houffalize (BEL)
9th Stage 3, UCI World Cup (Cross-country), Offenburg (GER)
2012
4th German MTB Championships (Cross-country), Germany
2013
1st German MTB Championships (Cross-country, ITT), Bad Salzdetfurth (GER)
2nd German MTB Championships (Cross-country), Bad Salzdetfurth (GER)
35th UCI World Championships (Cross-country), Pietermaritzburg (RSA)
