= Ann Ewing =

Ann Ewing and variants may refer to:

- Ann Ewing (Dallas), fictional character in the 2012 TV series Dallas
- Anna Ewing (died 2004), victim of Terry Blair (serial killer)
- Annabelle Ewing (born 1960), Scottish politician and lawyer
- Anne Ewing (1930–2011), American activist
- Margaret Anne Ewing (1945–2006), Scottish SNP MP and SNP MSP
- Ann E. Ewing, science journalist credited with first use of the term "black hole" in 1964
