= Cycling at the 2004 Summer Olympics – Women's cross-country =

Cycling at the Olympics

Women's cross-country at the Games of the XXVIII Olympiad
- Date: 27 August
- Competitors: 30 from 22 nations
- Winning time: 1:56:51

Medalists
1st place, gold medalist(s)		Gunn-Rita Dahle; Norway
2nd place, silver medalist(s)		Marie-Hélène Prémont; Canada
3rd place, bronze medalist(s)		Sabine Spitz; Germany

These are the results of the women's cross-country event in cycling at the 2004 Summer Olympics. The pre-race favourite, Norway's Gunn-Rita Dahle, dominated the race throughout, despite a fall that damaged the gears on her bicycle. The reigning world champion Sabine Spitz overtook Alison Sydor late in the race to claim bronze, behind Marie-Hélène Prémont. The winner of the gold medal at the previous two Olympics, Paola Pezzo of Italy, did not finish. The race consisted of 1 start loop and 5 full loop, a total of 31.3 km. It was held at 11:00 on 27 August 2004.

== Medalists ==
Gold	Silver	Bronze
Gunn-Rita Dahle (NOR)	Marie-Hélène Prémont (CAN)	Sabine Spitz (GER)

== Results ==
Final standings
Rank	Name	Country	Time
1st place, gold medalist(s)	Gunn-Rita Dahle	Norway	1:56:51
2nd place, silver medalist(s)	Marie-Hélène Prémont	Canada	1:57:50
3rd place, bronze medalist(s)	Sabine Spitz	Germany	1:59:21
4	Alison Sydor	Canada	1:59:47
5	Elsbeth van Rooy-Vink	Netherlands	2:01:41
6	Maja Włoszczowska	Poland	2:02:08
7	Ivonne Kraft	Germany	2:05:18
8	Laurence Leboucher	France	2:05:34
9	Mary McConneloug	United States	2:06:12
10	Lisa Mathison	Australia	2:07:01
11	Anna Szafraniec	Poland	2:07:44
12	Jimena Florit	Argentina	2:08:42
13	Irina Kalentieva	Russia	2:08:57
14	Bärbel Jungmeier	Austria	2:09:22
15	Kiara Bisaro	Canada	2:09:50
16	Robyn Wong	New Zealand	2:10:59
17	Ma Yanping	China	2:13:18
18	Jaqueline Mourão	Brazil	2:13:52
19	Katrin Leumann	Switzerland	2:16:07
20	Maria Östergren	Sweden	2:16:16
21	Jenny McCauley	Ireland	-1 lap
22	Yukari Nakagome	Japan	-1 lap
23	Karen Matamoros	Costa Rica	-1 lap
24	Elina Sofokleous	Cyprus	-2 laps
—	Margarita Fullana	Spain	DNF
—	Magdalena Sadlecka	Poland	DNF
—	Barbara Blatter	Switzerland	DNF
—	Mette Andersen	Denmark	DNF
—	Paola Pezzo	Italy	DNF
—	Janka Števková	Slovakia	DNF

== See also ==
- Cycling at the 2003 Pan American Games – Mountain Bike
