= Robyn Wong =

New Zealand cyclist

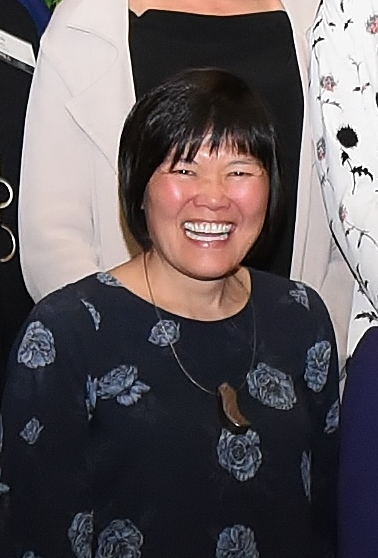
- Wong in 2018

Personal information
- Full name: Robyn Marie Wong
- Born: 23 November 1970 (age 55) Lower Hutt, New Zealand

Cycling career
- Sport: Cycling
- Current team: Retired
- Discipline: Cross country
- Role: Rider

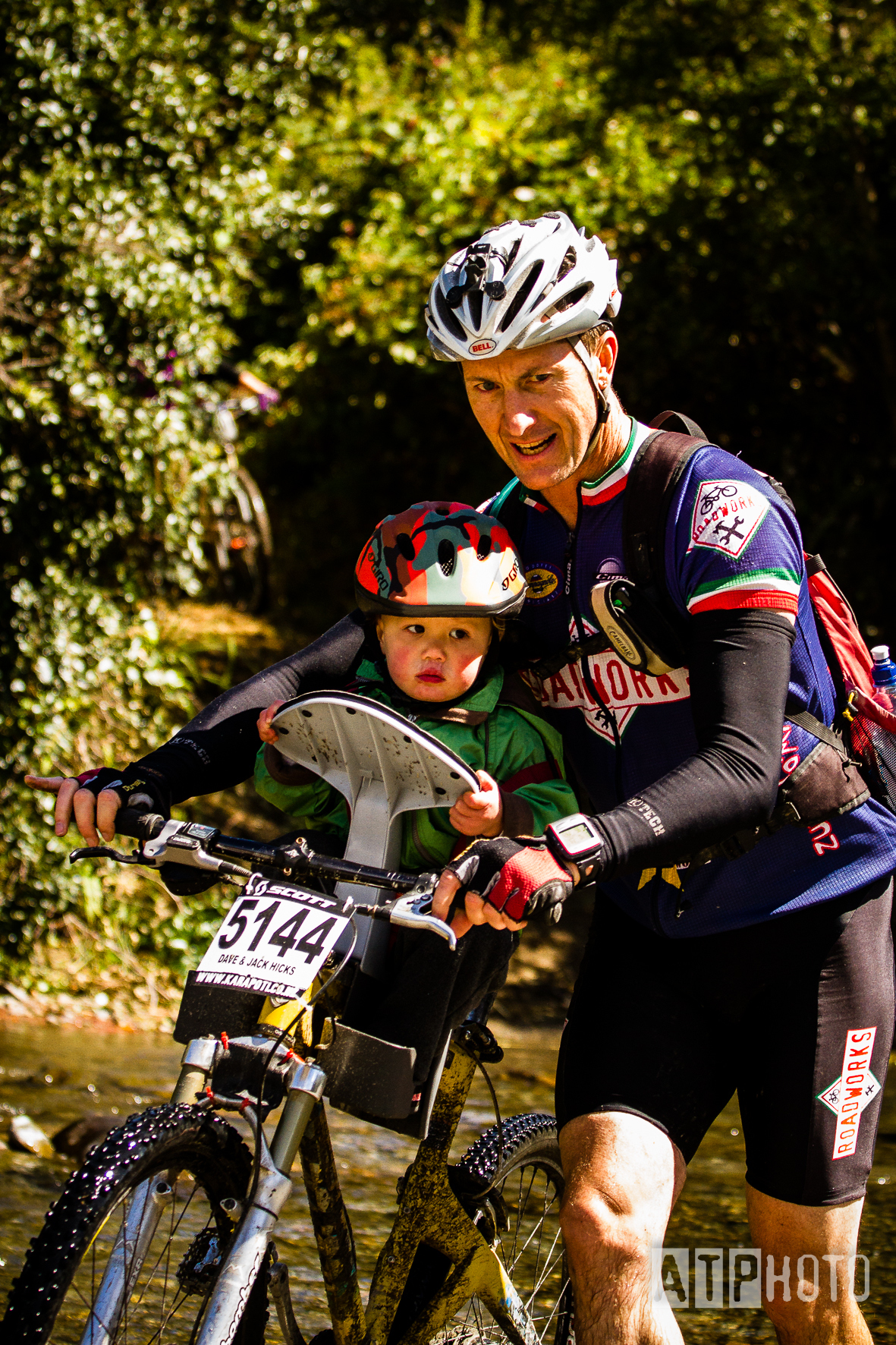
Wong's husband and son competing at the 2014 Karapoti Classic

Robyn Marie Wong (born 23 November 1970) is a New Zealand cyclist. She competed at the 2004 Summer Olympics in Athens, in the women's cross-country.

Wong was born in 1970 at Lower Hutt to Chinese parents. The family moved to the Wairarapa early in 1971, where Wong grew up. She was married to Dave Hicks and they have one son together, Jack, who was born in 2012.
