= Luca Schwarzbauer =

German cyclist (born 1996)

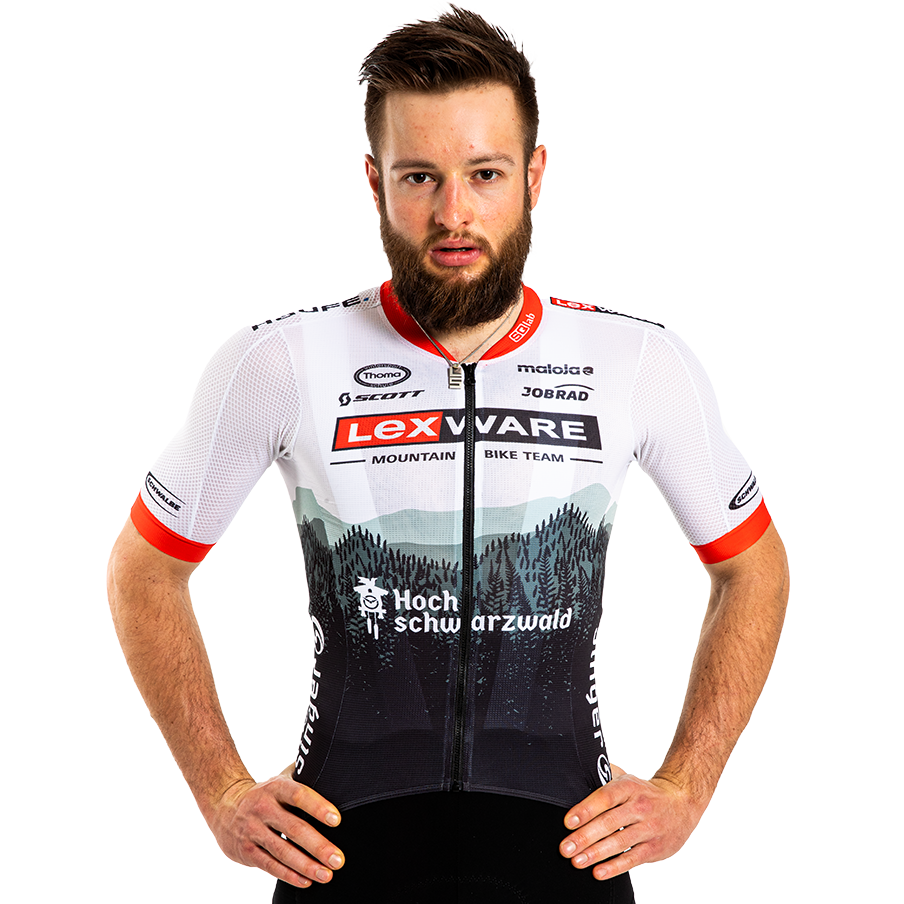
- Schwarzbauer in 2021

Personal information
- Born: 23 October 1996 (age 29)

Cycling career
- Sport: Cycling
- Current team: Canyon CLLCTV
- Discipline: Cross-country
- Role: Rider

Professional teams
- 2020–2021: Lexware MTB Team
- 2022–: Canyon CLLCTV

Luca Schwarzbauer (born 23 October 1996) is a German cross-country mountain biker.

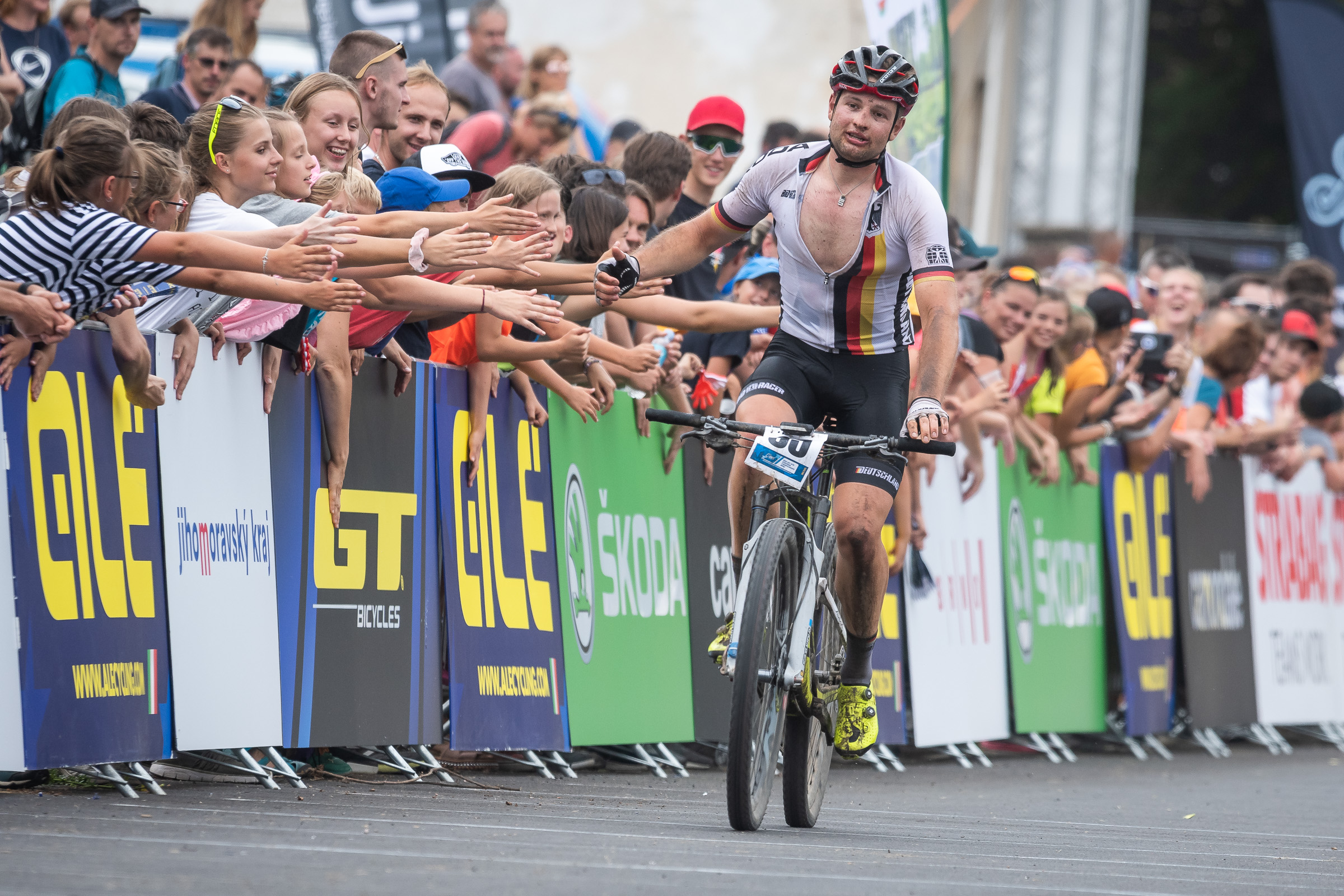
Schwarzbauer at the 2019 European Mountain Bike Championships

== Major results ==
2014
1st Cross-country, National Junior Championships
2nd Cross-country, UEC European Junior Championships
3rd Cross-country, UCI World Junior Championships
2020
2nd Marathon, National Championships
2021
1st Marathon, National Championships
3rd Team relay, UCI World Championships
2022
1st Short track, National Championships
UCI XCC World Cup

1st Nové Město

2023
1st Overall UCI XCC World Cup

1st Lenzerheide
1st Val di Sole
1st Vallnord
2nd Leogang
3rd Nové Město
3rd Les Gets
3rd Snowshoe

Shimano Super Cup Massi

2nd Banyoles

4th Overall UCI XCO World Cup

2nd Leogang
5th Vallnord

4th Cross-country, UEC European Championships
2024
1st Cross-country, National Championships
UCI XCC World Cup

2nd Mairiporã

2026

3rd Pal Arinsal, UCI XCO World Cup
