= Grand Prix Garage Collé Pétange =

The Grand Prix du Nouvel-An also called after its sponsor Grand Prix Garage Collé is a cyclo-cross race held in Pétange, Luxembourg.

== Past winners ==
Year	Men's winner	Women's winner
2022	Marcel Meisen (GER)	Christine Majerus (LUX)
2021	not held	not held
2020	Marcel Meisen (GER)	Shirin van Anrooij (NED)
2019	Marcel Meisen (GER)	Christine Majerus (LUX)
2018	Marcel Meisen (GER)	Christine Majerus (LUX)
2017	Marcel Meisen (GER)	Christine Majerus (LUX)
2016	Marcel Meisen (GER)	Thalita de Jong (NED)
2015	David van der Poel (NED)	not held
2014	Sascha Weber (GER)	not held
2013	Nicolas Bazin (FRA)	Marianne Vos (NED)
2012	John Gadret (FRA)	Marianne Vos (NED)
2011	Francis Mourey (FRA)	Marianne Vos (NED)
2010	Steve Chainel (FRA)	Marianne Vos (NED)
2009	Steve Chainel (FRA)	Georgia Gould (USA)
2008	Steve Chainel (FRA)	Maryline Salvetat (FRA)
2007	David Pagnier (FRA)	Maryline Salvetat (FRA)
2006	Jonathan Page (USA)	Marianne Vos (NED)
2005	Tom Vannoppen (BEL)	Daphny van den Brand (NED)
2004	Mario De Clercq (BEL)	not held
2003	Dariusz Gil (POL)	not held
2002	Dominique Arnould (FRA)	not held
2001	Christophe Morel (FRA)	not held
2000	Daniele Pontoni (ITA)	not held
1999	Daniele Pontoni (ITA)	not held
1998	Daniele Pontoni (ITA)	not held
1997	Daniele Pontoni (ITA)	not held
1996	Dominique Arnould (FRA)	not held
1974	Klaus-Peter Thaler (FRG)	not held
1968	René De Clercq (BEL)	not held
1966	Michel Pelchat (FRA)	not held
1965	Erik De Vlaeminck (BEL)	not held
1949	Roger Rondeaux (FRA)	not held
1948	Robert Oubron (FRA)	not held
