= Paul Voß =

German road racing cyclist

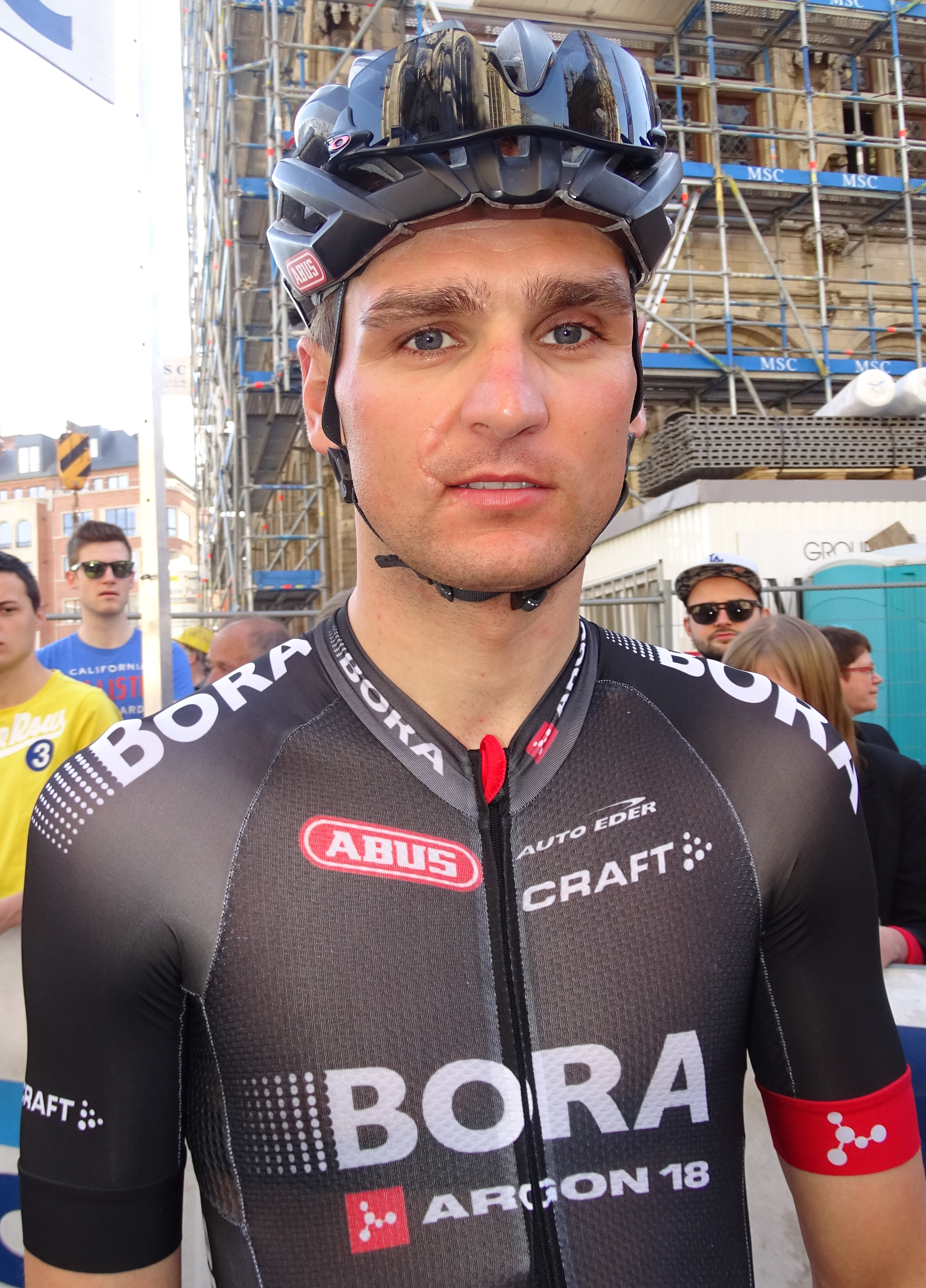
- Voß at the 2015 Brabantse Pijl

Personal information
- Full name: Paul Voß
- Born: 26 March 1986 (age 40) Rostock, East Germany
- Height: 1.78 m (5 ft 10 in)
- Weight: 66 kg (146 lb)

Cycling career
- Sport: Cycling
- Current team: RSK Potsdam
- Disciplines: Road; Cyclo-cross; Gravel
- Role: Rider; Directeur sportif
- Rider type: All-rounder

Amateur teams
- 2004: OSC Potsdam
- 2005: Frankfurter RC 90
- 2017–: RSK Potsdam
- 2021: Besenwagen
- 2023: Team SchnelleStelle p/b SC DHfK Leipzig

Professional teams
- 2006: Team Heinz Von Heiden
- 2007–2008: Team 3C Gruppe–Lamonta
- 2009–2010: Team Milram
- 2011–2012: Endura Racing
- 2013–2016: NetApp–Endura

Managerial teams
- 2017: WIGGINS
- 2017–2020: LKT Team Brandenburg
Medal record
Men's gravel bicycle racing
Representing Germany
European Championships
Bronze medal – third place	2023 Oud-Heverlee	Elite

Paul Voß (anglicised as Voss; born 26 March 1986) is a German cyclist, who rides for German amateur team RSK Potsdam. Voß rode professionally between 2006 and 2016 for the Team Heinz Von Heiden, Team 3C Gruppe–Lamonta, Team Milram, Endura Racing and Bora–Argon 18 squads, taking two professional wins, and has also worked as a directeur sportif for UCI Continental teams WIGGINS and LKT Team Brandenburg.

== Major results ==
=== Cyclo-cross ===
2003–2004
1st National Junior Championships
2004–2005
2nd National Under-23 Championships
2007–2008
2nd Diegem, Under-23 Superprestige
2nd Azencross, Under-23 GvA Trophy
UCI Under-23 World Cup

3rd Liévin
3rd Hofstade
3rd Milan

2008–2009
2nd Frankfurt
3rd National Championships
2009–2010
3rd National Championships

=== Gravel ===
2023
UCI World Series

1st Aachen
3rd Houffa
5th Berja

1st The Traka 200
2nd Gravel Locos - Hico
3rd UEC European Championships
3rd Finland

2024
1st German Championships Gravel
UCI World Series

2nd Sea Otter Europe Girona

2nd Wörthersee Gravel Race
2nd Sauerland Rundfahrt
4th UEC European Championships

2025
1st Rad am Ring
UCI World Series

2nd Blaavands Huk

3rd Santa Vall GC

=== Road ===
2007
5th Overall Thüringen Rundfahrt der U23
7th Sparkassen Giro Bochum
2008
2nd Road race, UEC European Under-23 Road Championships
2nd Ronde van Noord-Holland
8th Liège–Bastogne–Liège U23
9th Overall Thüringen Rundfahrt der U23
2010
1st Stage 1 (ITT) Volta a Catalunya
6th Overall Driedaagse van West-Vlaanderen
2011
1st Overall Cinturó de l'Empordà

1st Stage 1

3rd Overall Tour du Gévaudan Languedoc-Roussillon
4th Overall Czech Cycling Tour

1st Stage 1 (TTT)

2012
1st Mountains classification, Mi-Août Bretonne
2nd Tartu GP
5th Overall Tour du Gévaudan Languedoc-Roussillon
5th Paris–Bourges
6th Overall Settimana Internazionale di Coppi e Bartali
7th Druivenkoers Overijse
10th Overall Vuelta a Murcia
2013
5th Road race, National Road Championships
9th Brabantse Pijl
2014
5th Overall Arctic Race of Norway
7th Grand Prix of Aargau Canton
2015
1st Stage 1 (TTT) Giro del Trentino
8th Overall Tour of Alberta
2016
1st Rudi Altig Race
9th Trofeo Serra de Tramuntana
Tour de France

Held after Stage 1

==== Grand Tour general classification results timeline ====
Grand Tour	2009	2010	2011	2012	2013	2014	2015	2016
Giro d'Italia	—	DNF	—	—	—	—	—	—
Tour de France	—	—	—	—	—	50	99	101
Vuelta a España	99	70	—	—	68	—	—	—

Legend
—	Did not compete
DNF	Did not finish
