= Karel Camrda =

Czech cyclo-cross cylist

Personal information
- Born: 6 October 1964 (age 62) Tábor, Czechoslovakia

Cycling career
- Sport: Cycling
- Current team: Retired
- Discipline: Cyclo-cross
- Role: Rider
Medal record
Representing Czech Republic
Men's cyclo-cross
World Championships
Gold medal – first place	1988 Hägendorf	Amateur race
Silver medal – second place	1992 Leeds	Elite race

Karel Camrda (born 26 October 1964) is a Czech former cyclo-cross cyclist. He most notably won the amateur race at the 1988 UCI Cyclo-cross World Championships and a silver medal in the elite race at the 1992 UCI Cyclo-cross World Championships. He was also awarded the Czechoslovak Cyclist of the Year in 1992.

== Major results ==
1987–1988
1st UCI Amateur Cyclo-cross World Championships
3rd National Cyclo-cross Championships
1988–1989
1st National Cyclo-cross Championships
1989–1990
8th UCI Cyclo-cross World Championships
1990–1991
2nd National Cyclo-cross Championships
8th Overall Superprestige
1991–1992
2nd UCI Cyclo-cross World Championships
