= Marcus Klausmann =

German mountain biker

Personal information
- Born: 8 August 1977 (age 49) Albstadt, West Germany

Cycling career
- Sport: Cycling
- Discipline: Downhill
- Role: Rider
Medal record
Representing Germany
Men's mountain bike racing
World Championships
Silver medal – second place	1993 Métabief	Junior downhill
Silver medal – second place	1995 Kirchzarten	Junior downhill

Marcus Klausmann (born 8 August 1977) is a German former downhill mountain biker. He notably finished second overall at the 1996 UCI Downhill World Cup and won the second race in Nevegal, Italy. He also won the National Downhill Championships thirteen times: in 1997, 1998, 1999, 2000, 2002, 2003, 2004, 2005, 2006, 2007, 2009, 2010 and 2013.
