= Magdalena Sadłecka =

Polish cyclist

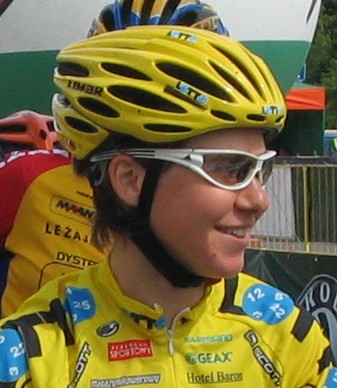

Personal information
- Nationality: Polish
- Born: 17 March 1982 (age 44) Łódź, Poland

Sport
- Country: Poland
- Sport: Mountain biking
Medal record
Women's mountain biking
Representing Poland
World Championships
| Silver medal – second place | 2003 Lugano | Cross-country marathon |

Magdalena Sadłecka (born 17 March 1982) is a Polish mountain biker.

She was born in Łódź. She competed at the 2004 Summer Olympics, in women's cross-country cycling.
