= Birgit Hollmann =

German racing cyclist (born 1973)

Personal information
- Born: 31 December 1973 (age 52) Berlin, Germany

Cycling career
- Sport: Cycling
- Disciplines: Road cycling, cyclo-cross
- Role: Rider

Birgit Hollmann (born 31 December 1973) is a former German racing cyclist born in Berlin. She participated in both road cycling and cyclo-cross. In 2003, she became German national champion in cyclo-cross.

She is the mother of World-Tour rider Juri Hollmann.

== Honours ==
=== Road cycling ===
2006
1st in 2nd stage of Krasna Lipa Tour Féminine

=== Cyclo-cross ===
2002
2nd in German elite national championships

2003
1st in German elite national championships
2nd in Herford
3rd in Gieten

2004
2nd in Gieten
2nd in German elite national championships

2005
1st in Lebbeke
2nd in Internationales Querfeldeinrennen
2nd in Hamburg
3rd in Gieten

2006
1st in Berlin
2nd in German elite national championships
2nd in Hofstade (2006/07 UCI Cyclo-cross World Cup)
3rd in Grand Prix du Nouvel-An
3rd in Treviso (2006/07 UCI Cyclo-cross World Cup)
3rd in Pijnacker (2006/07 UCI Cyclo-cross World Cup)
3rd in Overijse
