= Mathieu Heijboer =

Dutch professional road bicycle racer (born 1982)

Personal information
- Full name: Mathieu Heijboer
- Born: 4 February 1982 (age 44) Dordrecht, the Netherlands
- Height: 1.92 m (6 ft 4 in)
- Weight: 78 kg (172 lb)

Cycling career
- Sport: Cycling
- Discipline: Road
- Role: Rider

Professional teams
- 2003: Cycling Team Löwik–Tegeltoko
- 2004–2005: Rabobank GS3
- 2006–2008: Cofidis

Mathieu Heijboer (born 4 February 1982 in Dordrecht) is a former Dutch professional road bicycle racer and head of performance for Dutch Road Bicycle Racing squad Team Visma Lease a Bike

== Palmares ==
- Chrono Champenois (2005)
- Boucles de la Mayenne - Prologue (2005)
- Mainfranken Tour (2004)
