= Christoph Pfingsten =

German cyclist (born 1987)

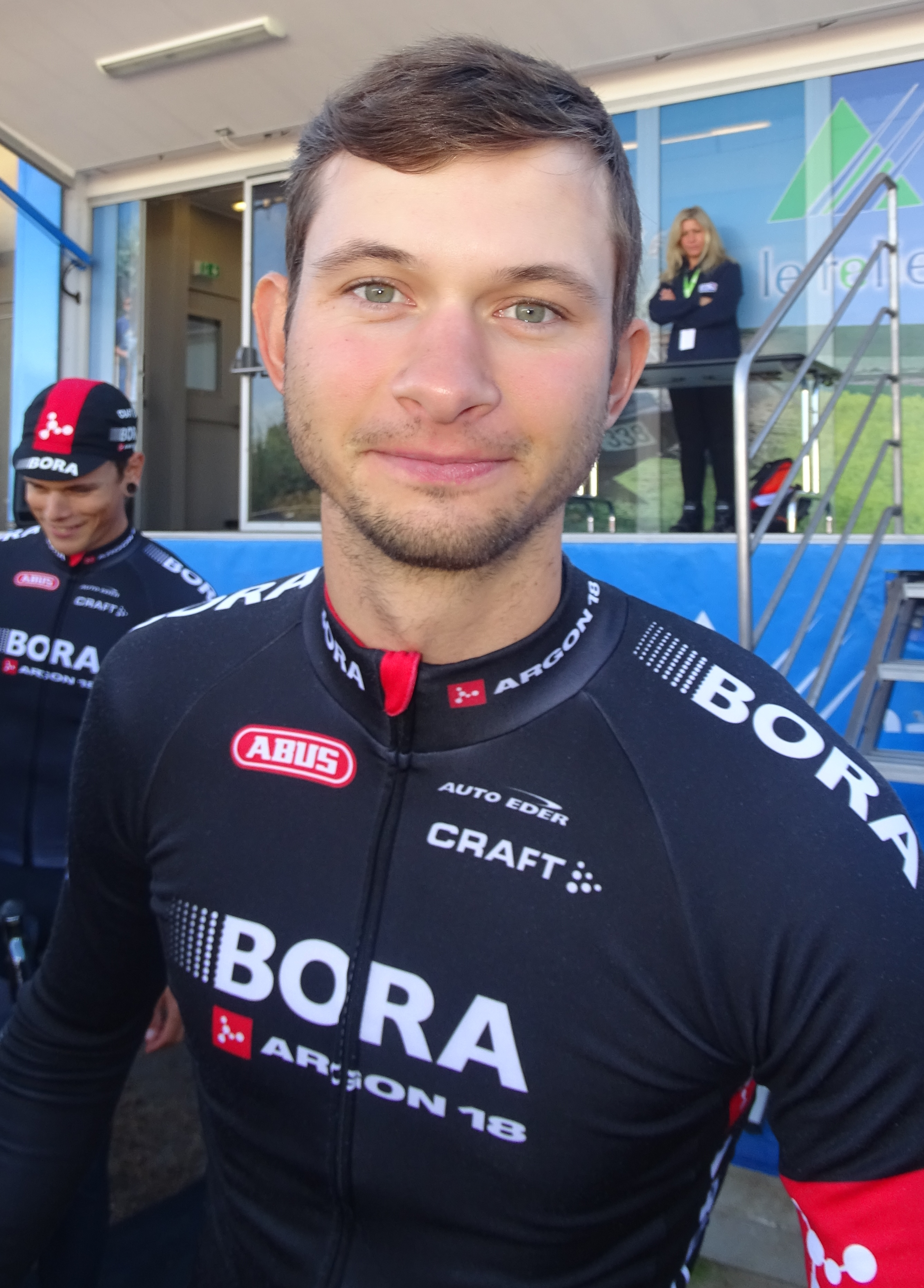
- Pfingsten in 2015

Personal information
- Full name: Christoph Pfingsten
- Born: 20 November 1987 (age 38) Potsdam, East Germany
- Height: 1.79 m (5 ft 10 in)
- Weight: 69 kg (152 lb)

Cycling career
- Sport: Cycling
- Current team: Retired
- Disciplines: Road; Cyclo-cross
- Role: Rider

Professional teams
- 2009–2014: Van Vliet–EBH Elshof
- 2015–2019: Bora–Argon 18
- 2020–2021: Team Jumbo–Visma

Christoph Pfingsten (born 20 November 1987) is a German former racing cyclist, who competed as a professional from 2009 to 2021. He rode at the 2013 UCI Road World Championships. He was named in the startlist for the 2016 Vuelta a España. In May 2018, he was named in the startlist for the 2018 Giro d'Italia.

== Major results ==
=== Road ===
2006
2nd Overall Mainfranken-Tour
2007
1st Stage 3 Grand Prix Cycliste de Gemenc
2009
4th Overall Tour de Berlin
5th Eschborn–Frankfurt Under–23
7th Overall Thüringen Rundfahrt der U23
2010
3rd Overall Ringerike GP

1st Stage 5

4th Rund um Düren
8th Arno Wallaard Memorial
2011
9th Overall Delta Tour Zeeland
2012
3rd Overall Olympia's Tour
2013
1st Prologue (TTT) Volta a Portugal
3rd Overall Circuit des Ardennes
3rd Ronde van Overijssel
2014
4th Overall Flèche du Sud

1st Prologue

8th Overall Circuit des Ardennes
2015
10th Scheldeprijs
2016
5th Overall Danmark Rundt
2018
1st Stage 1 (TTT) Czech Cycling Tour
7th Gran Piemonte
2019
2nd Rund um Köln

=== Grand Tour general classification results timeline ===
Grand Tour	2016	2017	2018	2019	2020
Giro d'Italia	—	—	58	—	DNF
Tour de France	—	—	—	—	—
Vuelta a España	75	142	—	—	—

Legend
—	Did not compete
DNF	Did not finish

=== Cyclo-cross ===
2004–2005
2nd National Junior Championships
3rd UCI Junior World Championships
3rd UEC European Junior Championships
2008–2009
2nd UCI Under-23 World Championships
2009–2010
2nd National Championships
2nd Int. Radcross
3rd Internationale Döhlauer Crossrennen
2010–2011
1st Internationale Döhlauer Crossrennen
2nd National Championships
2nd Velka Cena Mesta Tabora
Toi Toi Cup

1st Uničov
3rd Loštice

2011–2012
1st National Championships
1st Overall Toi Toi Cup

1st Holé Vrchy
1st Louny
1st Hlinsko

1st Frankfurter Rad-Cross
2012–2013
2nd Frankfurter Rad-Cross
3rd National Championships
