= Bärbel Jungmeier =

Austrian cyclist

Personal information
- Born: 8 July 1975 (age 51) Villach, Austria
- Height: 1.72 m (5 ft 8 in)
- Weight: 61 kg (134 lb)

Cycling career
- Sport: Cycling
- Discipline: Road cycling

Professional teams
- 2006: Elk Haus NÖ
- 2007–2008: Team Uniqa Graz

Bärbel Jungmeier (born 8 July 1975) is a road cyclist and mountain bike rider from Austria. She represented her nation at the 2004 Summer Olympics in the Women's cross-country. She also competed at the 2006 UCI Road World Championships.
