= Julian Schelb =

German cyclist (born 1992)

Personal information
- Born: 20 November 1992 (age 33)
- Height: 1.75 m (5 ft 9 in)
- Weight: 65 kg (143 lb)

Cycling career
- Sport: Cycling
- Current team: Stop&Go Marderabwehr MTB Team
- Discipline: Mountain bike racing
- Role: Rider
- Rider type: Cross-country

Professional teams
- 2015–2016: Multivan Merida Biking Team
- 2022–: Stop&Go Marderabwehr MTB Team
Medal record
Representing Germany
Men's mountain bike racing
World Championships
Silver medal – second place	2010 Mont Sainte-Anne	Team relay
Silver medal – second place	2013 Pietermaritzburg	Under-23 cross-country
Bronze medal – third place	2010 Mont Sainte-Anne	Junior cross-country
European Championships
Silver medal – second place	2024 Cheile Gradiştei	Cross-country short track
Bronze medal – third place	2024 Cheile Gradiştei	Cross-country

Julian Schelb (born 20 November 1992) is a German cross-country mountain biker.

As a junior and under-23 rider, Schelb won medals at the UCI World Championships in 2010 and 2013, before halting his career in 2016. He later returned to racing, winning the 2018 National Cross-country Marathon Championships. In 2024, he won two medals at the UEC European Championships, taking silver in the short track and bronze in the Olympic cross-country.

== Major results ==
=== Mountain bike ===
2010
UCI World Championships

2nd Team relay
3rd Junior cross-country

2013
2nd Cross-country, UCI World Under-23 Championships
2018
1st Marathon, National Championships
2019
2nd Marathon, National Championships
2024
UEC European Championships

2nd Short track
3rd Cross-country

UCI XCC World Cup

2nd Crans-Montana

UCI XCO World Cup

5th Crans-Montana

=== Cyclo-cross ===
2013–2014
2nd National Under-23 Championships
