= Regina Stiefl =

German mountain biker

Personal information
- Born: 11 October 1966 (age 60) Grainau, Germany

Cycling career
- Sport: Cycling
- Current team: Retired
- Discipline: Mountain biking
- Role: Rider

Major wins
- World Cup (1993, 1995)
Medal record
Representing Germany
Women's Mountain bike racing
World Cup
Gold medal – first place	1993	Downhill (DH)
Gold medal – first place	1995	Downhill (DH)
Bronze medal – third place	1991	Cross-country

Regina Stiefl (born 11 October 1966) is a German retired mountain biker. She competed in the 1990s, in both cross-country and downhill mountain biking. She won the German National Mountain Bike Championships for women's cross-country in 1991 and 1993. She returned to the nationals winning in the downhill category in 1994, 1995, and 1998. Stiefl won the Grundig World Cup in 1993 and 1995. She was inducted into the Mountain Bike Hall of Fame in 1999.

== Early life ==
Regina Stiefl was born on 11 October 1966, in Grainau, Germany. Her sister, Susi Dahlmeier, is also a mountain biker.

== Athletic career ==
Early in her athletic career, Stiefl was a top-ranking downhill skier.

Stiefl started her career as a cyclist in 1987, first in cross-country cycling. In 1991, she placed third in the UCI Mountain Bike World Cup in cross-country. She won the women's cross-country German National Mountain Bike Championships in 1991 and 1993. Following knee surgery and a heart muscle infection, she transitioned to downhill cycling. She won the women's downhill for the German National Mountain Bike Championships in 1994, 1995, and 1998. During the 1990s, she had a rivalry with American mountain biker Missy Giove. Stiefl won the Grundig World Cup in 1993.

At the 1995 World Cup downhill at Big Bear Lake, California, Stiefl forgot to lower her saddle and started the race with it several inches higher than normal. She placed second in the race and went on to win the World Cup.

Stiefl joined the Fiat-Rotwild racing team in 1998 and staged a brief comeback, competing in the 1999 UCI Mountain Bike World Cup. She was inducted into the Mountain Bike Hall of Fame in 1999.

== Personal life ==
Stiefl married fellow mountain biker Peter Stiefl. They had two children. After her cycling career, she became a stylist.
