= Lado Fumic =

German cyclist (born 1976)

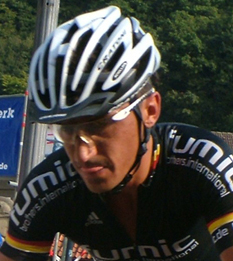
- Lado Fumic in 2006

Personal information
- Born: 20 May 1976 (age 50) Kirchheim unter Teck, West Germany
- Height: 1.80 m (5 ft 11 in)
- Weight: 69 kg (152 lb)

Cycling career
- Sport: Cycling
- Current team: Retired
- Discipline: Cross-country
- Role: Rider

Lado Fumic (born 20 May 1976) is a German former professional cross-country mountain biker. He is the older brother of fellow cyclist Manuel Fumic. He competed at the 2000 and 2004 Summer Olympics, finishing 5th in the cross-country in 2000. He is of Croatian ancestry.

== Major results ==
2000
1st National Cross-country Championships
2001
1st National Cross-country Championships
3rd Cross-country, European Mountain Bike Championships
2002
1st National Cross-country Championships
2nd Cross-country, European Mountain Bike Championships
2003
1st National Cross-country Championships
3rd Cross-country, European Mountain Bike Championships
2004
1st National Cross-country Championships
2nd Cross-country, European Mountain Bike Championships
2005
1st National Cross-country Championships
1st National Cross-country Marathon Championships
