= Ivonne Kraft =

German cyclist (born 1970)

Personal information
- Born: 8 July 1970 (age 56) Karlsruhe, West Germany

Cycling career
- Sport: Cycling

Ivonne Kraft (born 8 July 1970) is a German former cyclist. She competed in the women's cross-country mountain biking event at the 2004 Summer Olympics.
