= Mainfranken-Tour =

Race details
- Date: June
- Region: Mainfranken
- Discipline: Road race
- Competition: UCI Europe Tour
- Type: Single day race
- Web site: www.imft.de

History
- First edition: 1909
- Editions: 80
- Final edition: 2010
- First winner: Robert Tartsch (DEU)
- Final winner: Marc Goos (NED)

The Mainfranken-Tour was a cycling race held annually in Germany. It was part of UCI Europe Tour in category 2.2U.

== Winners ==
=== Mainfranken-Tour ===
- 2000 (Italy) Matteo Carrara
- 2001 (Netherlands) Marco Bos
- 2002 (Russia) Ivan Terenine
- 2003 (Germany) Mathias Jelitto
- 2004 (Netherlands) Mathieu Heijboer
- 2005 (France) Matthieu Ladagnous
- 2006 (Germany) Sebastian Schwager
- 2007 (Ukraine) Anatoliy Kashtan
- 2008 (Ukraine) Mykhailo Kononenko
- 2009 (Germany) Sebastian May
- 2010 (Netherlands) Marc Goos

=== Internationale Ernst-Sachs-Tour ===
- 1999 (Austria) Jochen Summer
- 1998 (Germany) Heinrich Trumheller
- 1997 (Germany) Stephan Schreck
- 1996 (Germany) S. Holzmann
- 1995 (Czech Republic) R. Konencny
- 1994 (Germany) Thomas Liese
- 1993 (Germany) Andreas Lebsanft
- 1992 (Germany) M. Weismann
- 1991 (Germany) Stephan Gottschling
- 1990 (East Germany) Steffen Rein
- 1989 (West Germany) Markus Schleicher
- 1988 (West Germany) Remig Stumpf
- 1987 (West Germany) Remig Stumpf
- 1986 (West Germany) Hartmut Bölts
- 1985 (West Germany) Hans Knauer

=== Internationales Ernst-Sachs-Gedächtnis-Rennen ===
- 1984 (West Germany) Jorgfried Schleicher
- 1983 (West Germany) Dieter Burkhardt
- 1982 (West Germany) Dieter Burkhardt
- 1981 (Austria) Helmut Wechselberger
- 1980 (West Germany) Friedrich von Loeffelholz
- 1979 (Switzerland) Richard Trinkler
- 1978 (Switzerland) Richard Trinkler
- 1977 (Austria) Hans Summer
- 1976 (West Germany) R. Weibel
- 1975 (Luxembourg) Marcel Thull
- 1974 (West Germany) Peter Weibel
- 1973 (Switzerland) I. Schmidt
- 1972 (West Germany) Dieter Leitner
- 1971 (West Germany) Jörg Frank
- 1970 (Switzerland) R. Savari
- 1969 (West Germany) Burkhard Ebert
- 1968 (West Germany) Johannes Knab
- 1967 (West Germany) Jürgen Goletz
- 1966 (Belgium) H. Van Sweevelt
- 1965 (Switzerland) Hans Lüthi
- 1964 (West Germany) H. Schulz
- 1963 (West Germany) G. Schulz
- 1962 (Netherlands) Wim Dieperink
- 1961 (West Germany) August Korte
- 1960 (West Germany) H. Bath
- 1959 (Netherlands) Frans Balvert
- 1958 (Belgium) W. Van Der Berghen
- 1957 (Italy) Noél Conti
- 1956 (West Germany) Edi Ziegler
- 1955 (West Germany) Walter Becker
- 1954 (West Germany) Walter Becker
- 1953 (West Germany) Edi Ziegler
- 1952 (Belgium) M. Janssens

=== Rund um Spessart und Rhön ===
- 1951 (West Germany) Richard Popp
- 1950 (West Germany) Richard Popp
- 1936–1949 no race
- 1935 (Germany) Reinhold Wendel
- 1934 (Germany) Josef Remold
- 1933 (Germany) Rudi Wölkert
- 1932 no race
- 1931 (Germany) Gerhard Hanke
- 1930 (Germany) Rudolf Risch
- 1929 (Germany) K. Hedwig
- 1928 (Germany) O. Kürschner
- 1927 (Germany) Ludwig Geyer
- 1926 no race
- 1925 (Germany) Otto Gugau
- 1924 (Germany) M. Schröck
- 1923 (Germany) A. Schneidawind
- 1922 (Germany) Karl Pfister
- 1921 (Germany) Karl Pfister
- 1920 (Germany) Adam Sachs
- 1915–1920 no race
- 1914 (Germany) Karl Pfister
- 1913 (Germany) A. Reitberger
- 1912 (Germany) A. Reitberger
- 1911 (Germany) E. Gall
- 1910 (Germany) Hans Hartmann
- 1909 (Germany) Robert Tartsch
