= Carsten Bresser =

German cyclist

Personal information
- Born: 4 September 1970 (age 56) Würzburg, West Germany

Cycling career
- Sport: Cycling
- Current team: Retired
- Discipline: Cross-country
- Role: Rider
Medal record
Representing Germany
Men's Mountain bike marathon
World Championships
Bronze medal – third place	2003 Lugano	Men's race

Carsten Bresser (born 4 September 1970) is a German former cross-country mountain biker. He competed at the 2000 Summer Olympics and the 2004 Summer Olympics.
