= Manuel Fumic =

German cyclist (born 1982)

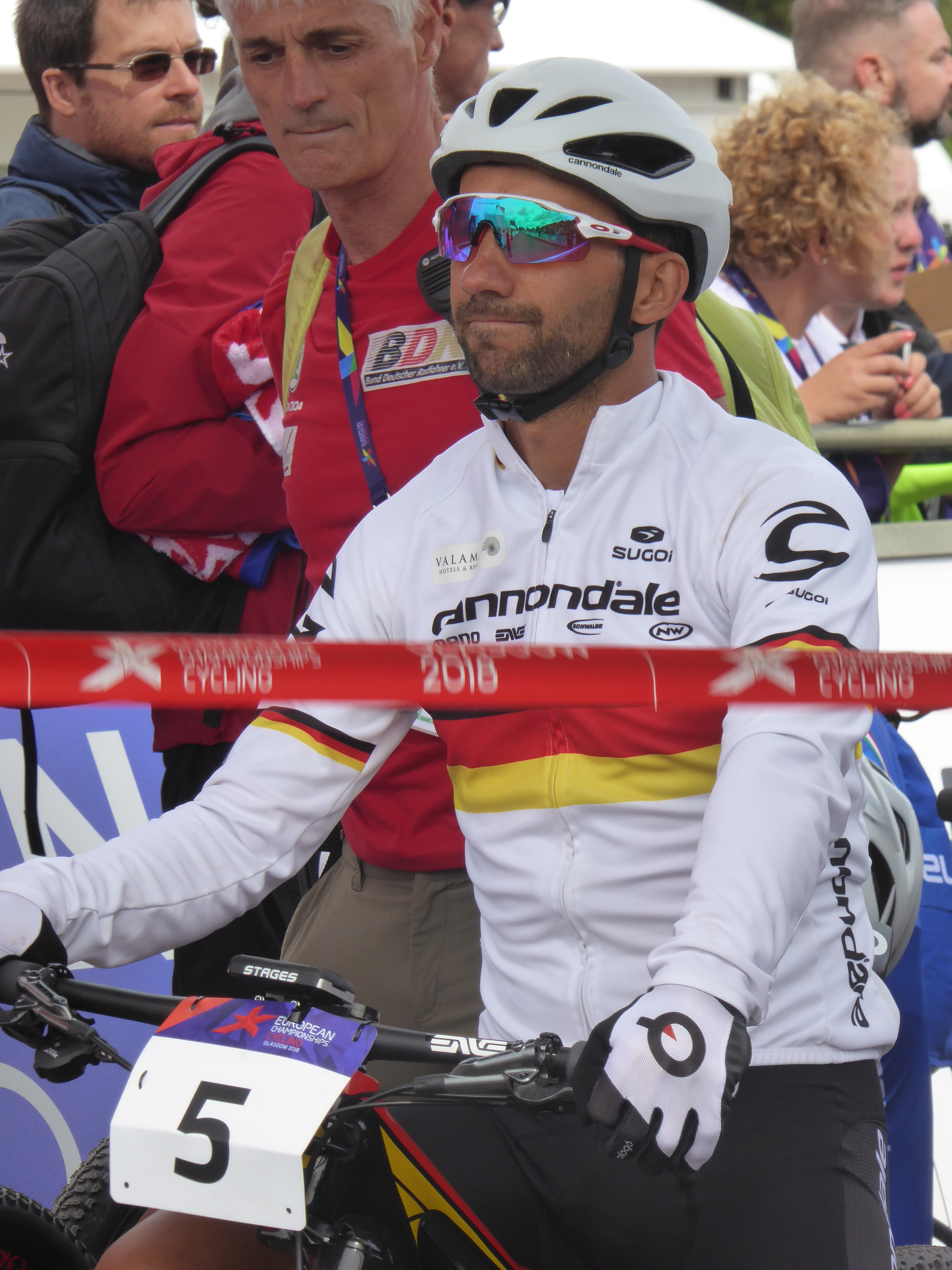
- Fumic at the 2018 European Mountain Bike Championships

Personal information
- Born: 30 March 1982 (age 44) Kirchheim unter Teck, West Germany
- Height: 175 cm (5 ft 9 in)
- Weight: 69 kg (152 lb)

Cycling career
- Sport: Cycling
- Discipline: Mountain bike
- Role: Rider
- Rider type: Cross-country

Professional teams
- 2006–2009: Fumic.Brothers.International
- 2010–2021: Cannondale Factory Racing

Managerial team
- 2022–2024: Cannondale Factory Racing
Medal record
Men's mountain bike racing
Representing Germany
World Championships
| Gold medal – first place | 2004 Les Gets | Under-23 cross-country |
| Silver medal – second place | 2013 Pietermaritzburg | Cross-country |
| Silver medal – second place | 2018 Lenzerheide | Team relay |
| Silver medal – second place | 2003 Lugano | Under-23 cross-country |

Manuel Fumic (born 30 March 1982) is a German former cross-country cyclist. He finished 8th at the 2004 Summer Olympics and 11th at the 2008 Olympic Games. At the 2012 Summer Olympics, he competed in the men's cross-country at Hadleigh Farm, finishing in 7th place. At the 2016 Summer Olympics, he finished in 13th place.

Fumic retired at the end of the 2021 season, becoming the team manager for Cannondale Factory Racing.

== Personal life ==
He is the younger brother of Lado Fumic.

== Major results ==
2001
1st National Under-23 XCO Championships
2002
1st National Under-23 XCO Championships
2003
1st National Under-23 XCO Championships
2nd UCI Under-23 World XCO Championships
3rd European Under-23 XCO Championships
2004
1st UCI Under-23 World XCO Championships
1st European Under-23 XCO Championships
1st National Under-23 XCO Championships
2008
1st National XCO Championships
2010
2nd Mixed relay, UCI World Championships
2012
1st National XCO Championships
3rd Mixed relay, UCI World Championships
2013
2nd UCI World XCO Championships
3rd Mixed relay, UCI World Championships
2014
4th Overall UCI XCO World Cup
2015
European Championships

1st Mixed relay
3rd XCO

1st National XCO Championships
2017
1st National XCO Championships
3rd European XCO Championships
2018
1st National XCO Championships
2nd Mixed relay, UCI World Championships
2019
2nd Overall Cape Epic (with Henrique Avancini)
2021
1st National XCO Championships
