= Winfried Gottschalk =

German cyclist (1944–2021)

Personal information
- Born: 19 May 1944 Cologne, Germany
- Died: 19 June 2021 (aged 77)

Cycling career
- Sport: Cycling
- Role: Rider

Winfried Gottschalk (19 May 1944 – 19 June 2021) was a German racing cyclist. He rode in the 1968 Tour de France.
