= Hedda zu Putlitz =

German cyclist

Personal information
- Born: 4 September 1965 (age 61) Neumünster, West Germany

Cycling career
- Sport: Cycling

Hedda zu Putlitz (born 4 September 1965) is a German former cyclist. She competed in the women's cross-country mountain biking event at the 2000 Summer Olympics.
