= Jenny McCauley =

Irish cyclist

Personal information
- Born: 8 July 1974 (age 52) Dublin, Ireland

Cycling career
- Sport: Cycling

Jenny McCauley (born 8 July 1974) is an Irish cyclist. She competed in the women's cross-country mountain biking event at the 2004 Summer Olympics.
