= Marcel Meisen =

German cyclist (born 1989)

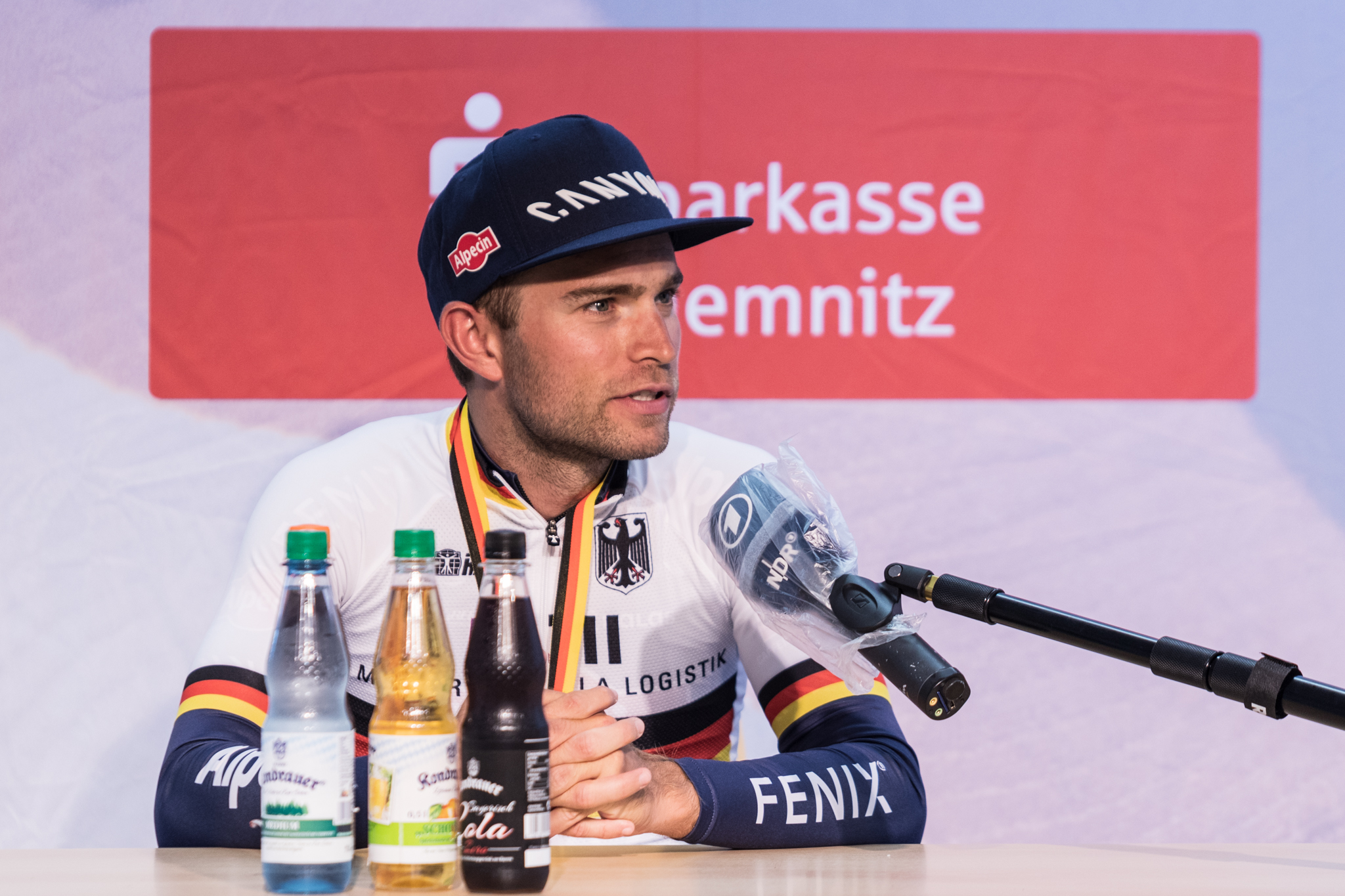
- Meisen in 2020

Personal information
- Born: 8 January 1989 (age 37) Stolberg, Germany
- Height: 1.72 m (5 ft 8 in)
- Weight: 62 kg (137 lb)

Cycling career
- Sport: Cycling
- Current team: RC Zugvogel 09 Aachen; Stevens Racing Team
- Disciplines: Cyclo-cross; Road
- Role: Rider

Amateur teams
- 2004–2007: RSC 1928 Stolberg
- 2006–2007: Team Focus-Bikers
- 2011: Team NRW
- 2016: Steylaerts–Verona
- 2022: Stevens Racing Team
- 2022–: RC Zugvogel 09 Aachen
- 2022–: Stevens Racing Team

Professional teams
- 2008–2011: Kuota–Senges
- 2012–2013: BKCP–Powerplus
- 2013–2015: Kwadro–Stannah
- 2015–2016: Team Kuota–Lotto
- 2017–2021: Beobank–Corendon
- 2022: Team Lotto–Kern Haus

Major wins
- Cyclo-cross National Championships (2015, 2017–2022, 2026) Road One-day races and Classics National Road Race Championships (2020)

Marcel Meisen (born 8 January 1989) is a German cyclo-cross and road cyclist, who rides for German amateur teams RC Zugvogel 09 Aachen and Stevens Racing Team. He has represented his nation in the men's elite event at the UCI Cyclo-cross World Championships, on eleven occasions.

== Major results ==
=== Cyclo-cross ===
2007–2008
1st National Under-23 Championships
2013–2014
1st Dottignies
1st Woerden
2nd National Championships
2014–2015
1st National Championships
2015–2016
Toi Toi Cup

1st Slaný
1st Uničov

1st Faè Di Oderzo
1st Pétange
2nd Woerden
3rd National Championships
2016–2017
1st National Championships
Toi Toi Cup

1st Uničov

1st Iowa City
1st Milano
1st Faè Di Oderzo
1st Pétange
2nd Overall EKZ CrossTour

1st Meilen
2nd Eschenbach

UCI World Cup

2nd Fiuggi

3rd Contern
2017–2018
1st National Championships
EKZ CrossTour

1st Hittnau
1st Eschenbach

1st Milano
1st Pétange
2nd Gorizia
3rd Faè Di Oderzo
2018–2019
1st National Championships
EKZ CrossTour

1st Meilen

1st Poprad
1st Munich
1st Bensheim
1st Pétange
2nd Neerpelt
Toi Toi Cup

3rd Uničov

2019–2020
1st National Championships
1st Overall EKZ CrossTour

1st Hittnau
1st Meilen

Toi Toi Cup

1st Mladá Boleslav

1st Pétange
1st Poprad
2020–2021
1st National Championships
1st Lützelbach
2021–2022
1st National Championships
1st Faè Di Oderzo
1st Pétange
1st Lützelbach
2022–2023
1st Gernelle
1st Lützelbach
1st Vittorio Veneto
2nd National Championships
2nd Bensheim
3rd Bad Salzdetfurth
3rd Faè Di Oderzo
2023–2024
1st Gernelle
3rd Pétange
2024–2025
3rd Pétange
2025–2026
1st National Championships

=== Road ===
2011
6th Overall Coupe des nations Ville Saguenay
2012
1st Stage 4 Mi-Août en Bretagne
2013
1st Stage 3 Boucles de la Mayenne
1st Stage 6 Tour Alsace
1st Stage 2 Baltic Chain Tour
2015
1st Mountains classification, Course de Solidarność et des Champions Olympiques
2nd Overall Tour de Gironde

1st Stage 2

2nd Overall Oberösterreich Rundfahrt

1st Stage 3

9th Overall Flèche du Sud
2016
5th Overall Tour de Gironde
8th Overall Course de Solidarność et des Champions Olympiques
2017
9th Overall Boucles de la Mayenne
2018
10th Elfstedenronde
2020
1st Road race, National Championships
2021
9th Overall Deutschland Tour
