= Johannes Fischbach =

German mountain biker

Johannes Fischbach (born 4 March 1988 in Tirschenreuth) is a German downhill mountain biker.

== Titles ==
- Winner of the 2008 German national downhill four-cross championship.
- Winner of the 2007 German national downhill four-cross championship.
