= Hartmut Bölts =

German cyclist (born 1961)

Personal information
- Born: 14 June 1961 (age 65) Rodalben, West Germany

Cycling career
- Sport: Cycling
- Discipline: Road
- Role: Rider

Professional teams
- 1988–1989: RMO–Cycles Méral–Mavic
- 1990–1991: Stuttgart–Mercedes–Merckx–Puma
- 1992–1996: Marin

Hartmut Bölts (born 14 June 1961) is a German former racing cyclist. In 1985 he won the Hessen-Rundfahrt. He won the German National Road Race in 1988. He also competed in the team time trial event at the 1984 Summer Olympics. He is the brother of fellow former cyclist Udo Bölts.

== Major results ==
1983
1st Overall Flèche du Sud
1st Stage 4 Circuit des Ardennes
3rd Rund um Düren
1984
6th Overall Tour de Luxembourg
1985
1st Overall Hessen-Rundfahrt
1986
1st Overall Ernst-Sachs-Tour
3rd Overall Tour de Berlin
1987
1st National Amateur Road Race Championships
1988
1st National Road Race Championships
4th Road race, World Road Championships
1990
6th Overall Herald Sun Tour

1st Stage 8

1993
1st Stage 8 Bayern Rundfahrt
1994
1st Stage 5 Bayern Rundfahrt
