= Maximilian Brandl =

German cyclist (born 1997)

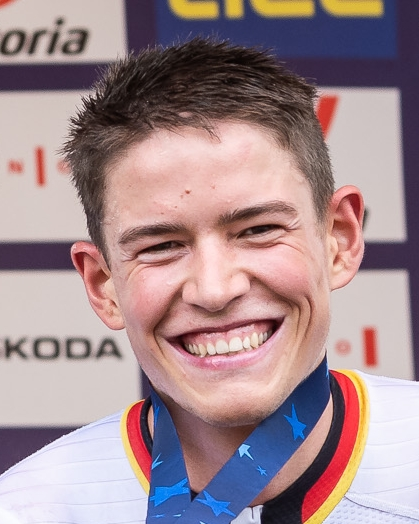
- Brandl in 2019

Personal information
- Born: 25 June 1997 (age 29)
- Height: 1.85 m (6 ft 1 in)

Cycling career
- Sport: Cycling
- Current team: LEXWARE Mountainbike Team
- Discipline: Mountain bike racing
- Role: Rider
- Rider type: Cross-country
Medal record
Representing Germany
Men's mountain bike racing
World Championships
Silver medal – second place	2018 Lenzerheide	Team relay
Silver medal – second place	2015 Vallnord	Junior cross-country
Bronze medal – third place	2021 Val di Sole	Cross-country Short Track
Bronze medal – third place	2017 Cairns	Under-23 cross-country
European Championships
Gold medal – first place	2015 Chies d'Alpago	Team relay
Bronze medal – third place	2019 Brno	Under-23 cross-country
Bronze medal – third place	2015 Chies d'Alpago	Junior cross-country

Maximilian Brandl (born 25 June 1997) is a German cross-country mountain biker. He competed in the cross-country race at the 2020 Summer Olympics.

He competed at the 2018 UCI Mountain Bike World Championships, winning a silver medal in the team relay.

== Major results ==
2015
1st Team relay, European Championships
1st National Junior XCO Championships
2nd UCI Junior World XCO Championships
3rd European Junior XCO Championships
2017
1st National Under-23 XCO Championships
3rd UCI Under-23 World XCO Championships
2018
2nd Team relay, UCI World Championships
2019
1st National XCO Championships
3rd European Under-23 XCO Championships
4th Overall UCI Under-23 World Cup
2020
1st National XCO Championships
2021
3rd UCI World XCC Championships
