= Moritz Milatz =

German cross-country mountain biker

Personal information
- Full name: Moritz Milatz
- Born: 24 June 1982 (age 44) Freiburg im Breisgau, West Germany
- Height: 173 cm (5 ft 8 in)
- Weight: 65 kg (143 lb)

Cycling career
- Sport: Cycling
- Discipline: Mountain bike
- Role: Rider
- Rider type: Cross-country and marathon
Medal record
Representing Germany
Men's mountain bike marathon
World Championships
Silver medal – second place	2012 Ornans	Men's race
European Championships
Bronze medal – third place	2007 Albstadt	Men's race
Men's mountain bike racing
European Championships
Gold medal – first place	2012 Moscow	Cross-country

Moritz Milatz (born 24 June 1982) is a German cross-country mountain biker. At the 2012 Summer Olympics, he competed in the Men's cross-country at Hadleigh Farm, finishing in 34th place. Previously, he had finished in 16th place at the 2008 Summer Olympics. At the 2016 Summer Olympics, he finished in 28th place.
