= Mike Kluge =

German cyclist (born 1962)

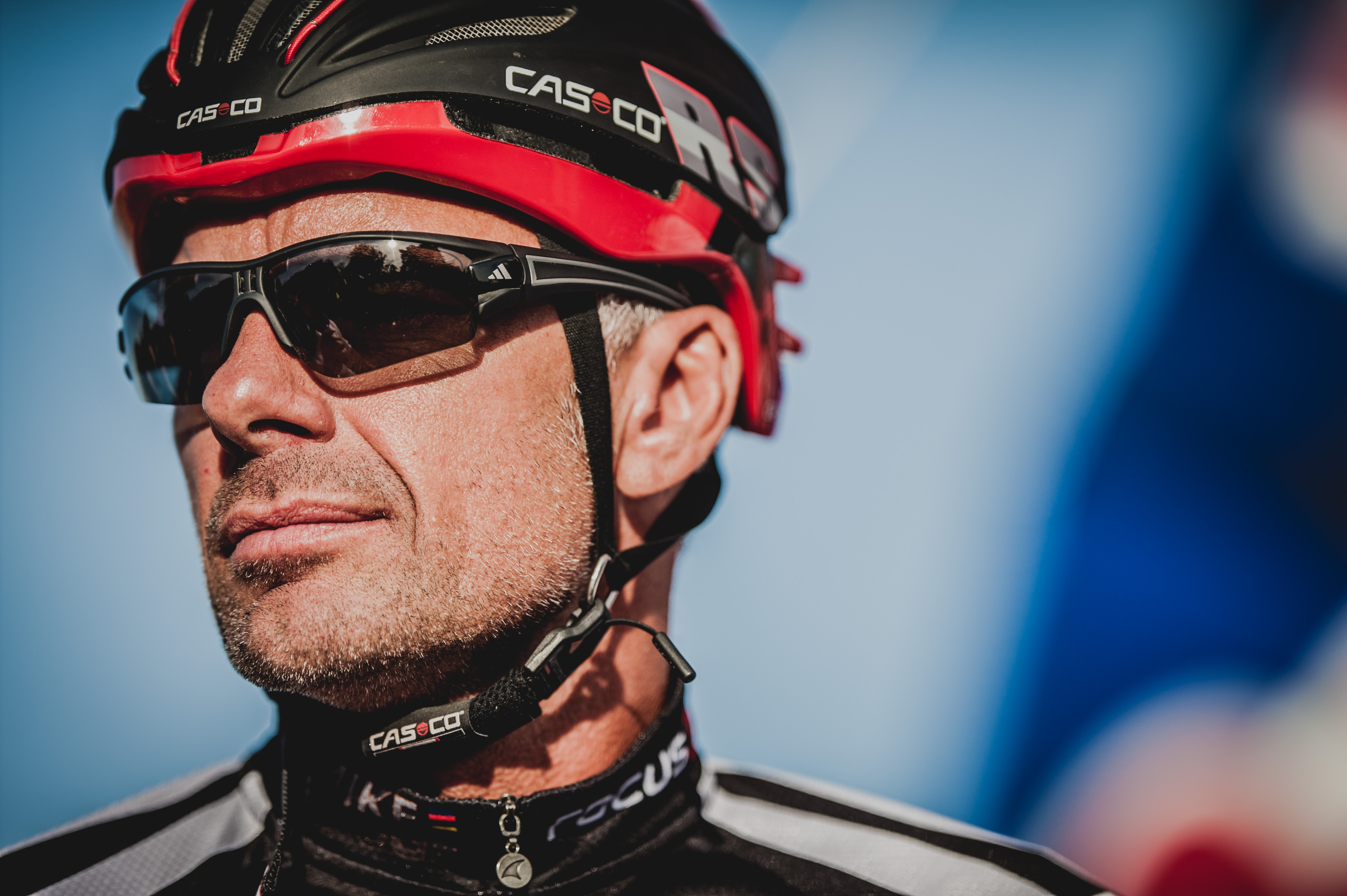
- Kluge in 2015

Personal information
- Born: September 25, 1962 (age 64) Berlin

Cycling career
- Sport: Cycling
- Discipline: Cyclo-cross
- Role: Rider
Medal record
Representing Germany
Men's cyclo-cross
World Championships
Gold medal – first place	1992 Leeds	Elite Race

Mike Kluge (born 25 September 1962 in Berlin) is a German cyclist. Kluge is a multiple German champion and amateur world champion in cyclo-cross in 1985 and 1987 and professional world champion in 1992.

In 1992 Kluge set up the bicycle manufacturing company Focus Bikes in Cloppenburg, Germany. He also competed in the men's cross-country at the 1996 Summer Olympics.
