= Regina Marunde =

German cyclist

Personal information
- Born: 26 August 1968 (age 58) West Berlin, West Germany

Cycling career
- Sport: Cycling

Regina Marunde (born 26 August 1968) is a German cyclist. She competed in the women's cross-country mountain biking event at the 1996 Summer Olympics.
