= Elisabeth Brandau =

German bicycle racer

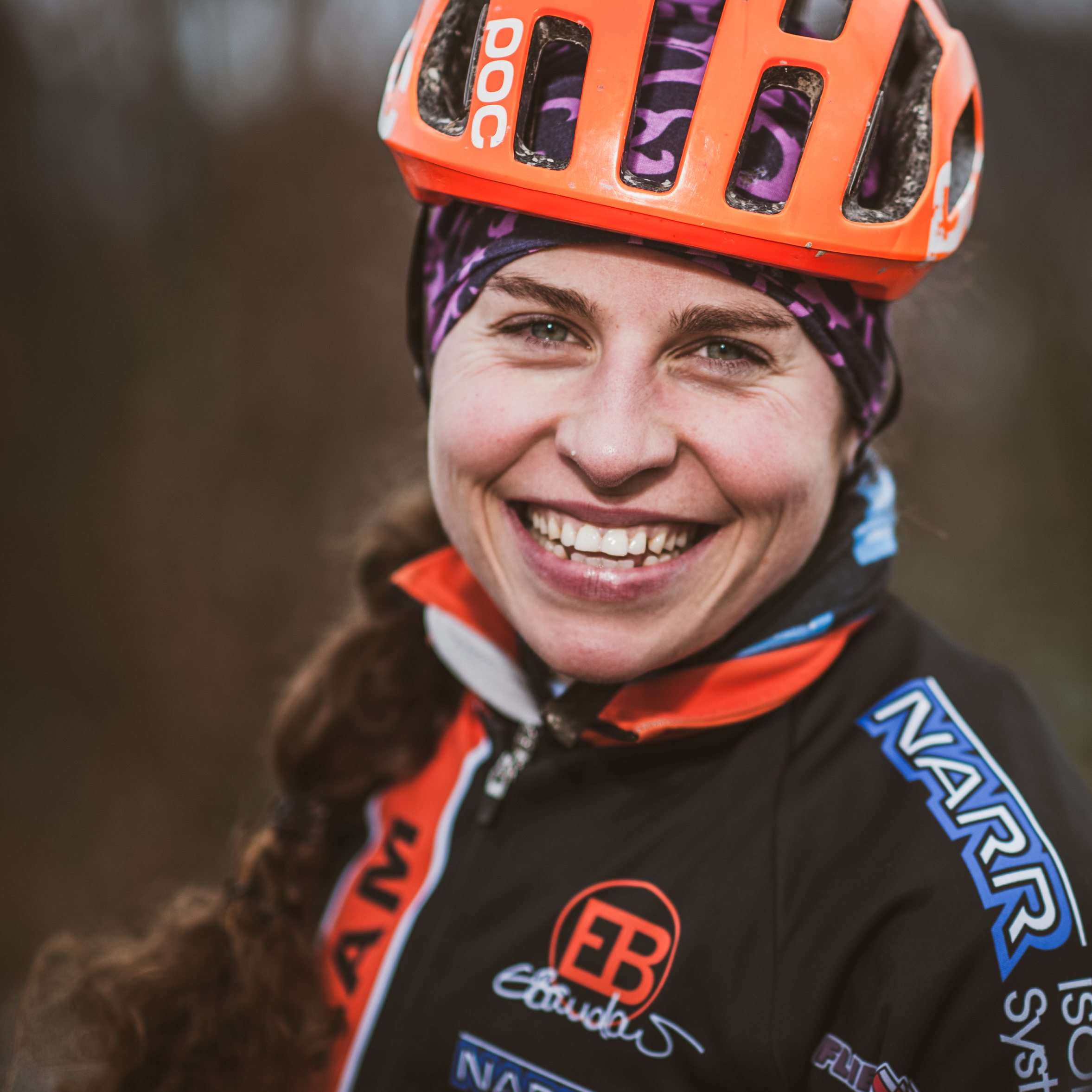

Personal information
- Born: 16 December 1985 (age 40)

Cycling career
- Sport: Cycling
- Disciplines: Mountain Bike (Cross-Country), and Cyclo-cross
- Role: Rider
Medal record
World Championships
Silver medal – second place	2018 Lenzerheide	Team relay
European Championships
Bronze medal – third place	2019 Brno	Cross-country

Elisabeth Brandau (born 16 December 1985) is a German female Mountain Bike and cyclo-cross cyclist. She represented her nation in the women's elite event at the 2016 UCI Cyclo-cross World Championships in Heusden-Zolder.

She was on the start list of 2018 Cross-Country European Championships and finished 5.
