= Sabine Spitz =

German cyclist (born 1971)

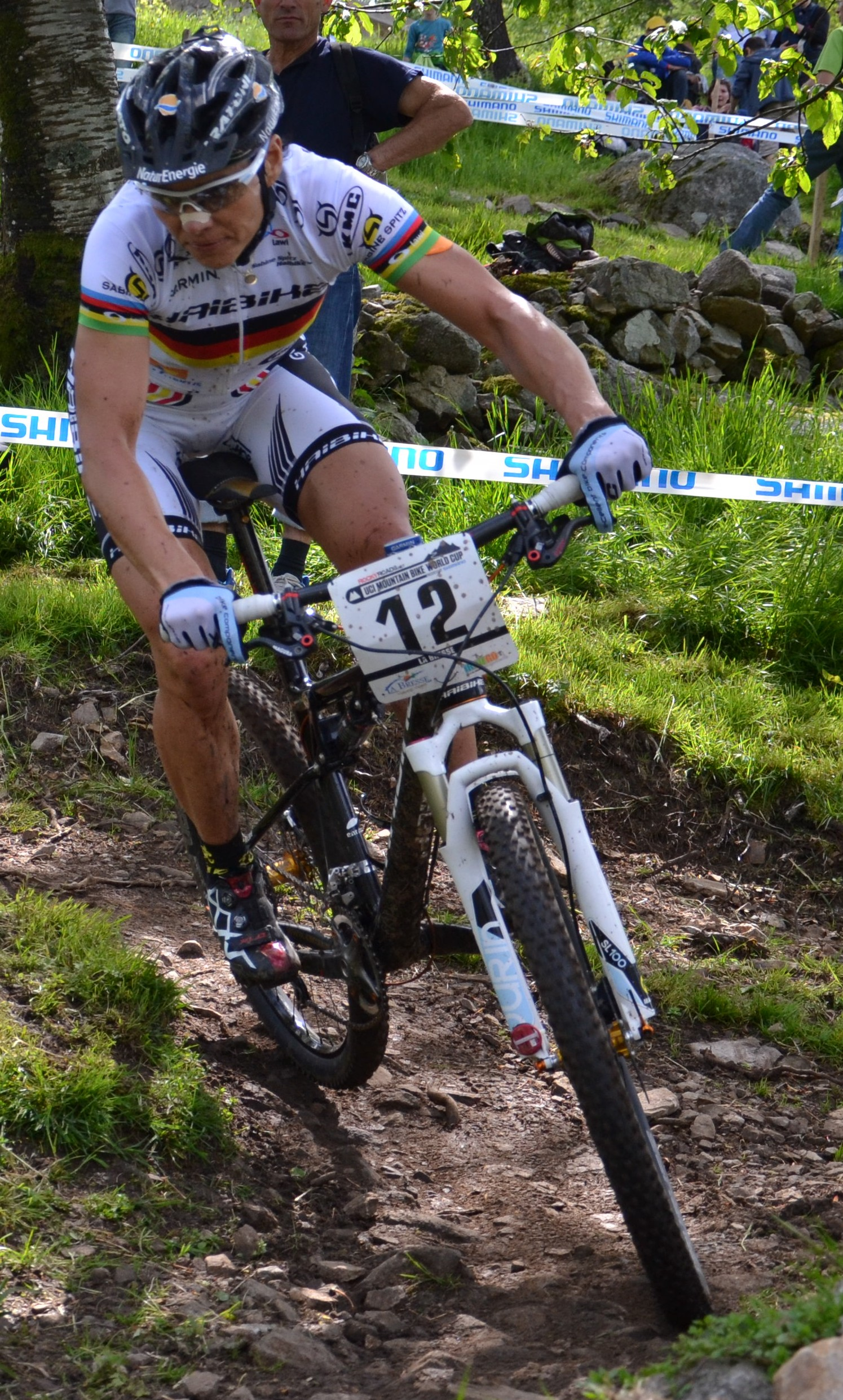

Personal information
- Born: 27 December 1971 (age 54) Herrischried, Baden-Württemberg, West Germany
- Height: 168 cm (5 ft 6 in)
- Weight: 60 kg (132 lb)

Cycling career
- Sport: Cycling
- Discipline: Mountain bike racing
- Role: Rider
- Rider type: Cross-country
Medal record
Women's cycling
Representing Germany
Event	1st	2nd	3rd
Olympic Games	1	1	1
World Championships	2	5	2
European Championships	0	0	0
European Games	0	0	0
Total	3	6	2
Olympic Games
Gold medal – first place	2008 Beijing	Cross-country
Silver medal – second place	2012 London	Cross-country
Bronze medal – third place	2004 Athens	Cross-country
World Championships
Gold medal – first place	2003 Lugano	Cross-country
Gold medal – first place	2009 Graz	Marathon
Silver medal – second place	2005 Sankt Wendel	Cyclo-cross
Silver medal – second place	2007 Fort William	Cross-country
Silver medal – second place	2008 Val di Sole	Cross-country
Silver medal – second place	2007 Verviers	Marathon
Silver medal – second place	2008 Niederdorf	Marathon
Bronze medal – third place	2001 Vail	Cross-country
Bronze medal – third place	2002 Kaprun	Cross-country

Sabine Spitz (born 27 December 1971) is a German cross country cyclist. She won bronze in Women's cross-country at the 2004 Summer Olympics, silver in the event in the 2012 Summer Olympics and gold in the event in the 2008 Summer Olympics. Furthermore, she became World Champion in 2003. At the 2016 Summer Olympics, she finished in 19th place.

In March 2017, Spitz raced her second eight-day Absa Cape Epic stage race in South Africa. She and South African partner Robyn de Groot were the pre-race favourites for the Women's Category but Spitz had a problematic ride: she crashed badly on two stages and these setbacks ultimately cost them any chance of victory. They eventually finished the 651 km route in third place. In 2016, she and Ukrainian Yana Belomoina had finished second in the race, which takes place in the Western Cape each year.
