= Anne Ewing =

American biologist and activist

- Born: November 19, 1930; Wytheville, Virginia
- Died: April 11, 2011 (aged 80); San Diego, California
- Occupation: Environmental Planner
- Known for: Women's rights advocacy

Anne Ewing (November 19, 1930 – April 11, 2011) was an American biologist and activist for women's rights. She is known for her advocacy for women's rights and her role in removing racist and sexist language from primary school readers in California.

== Early life and education ==
Ewing was born Ann Drayton Heuser on November 19, 1930, in the upstairs bedroom of her family's home located in Wytheville, Virginia. As a student she wanted to study chemistry but was told that subject was only for men. She earned her undergraduate degree in biology from the College of William and Mary in Virginia, and a master's degree in botany from the University of Tennessee in the 1950s.

== Career ==
=== Researcher ===
Ewing worked as a research fellow for three years (1972-1975) at Scripps Institution of Oceanography in La Jolla, California, designing and conducting research to understand salt-tolerance in plants. Later, she worked in the Planning and Land Use Office of the County of San Diego (1975-1995). Ewing worked to protect numerous native plants and animals from losing their homes to development projects. She also was a lead planner for the Otay Ranch section of Chula Vista, California. Additionally, she was an active member of the Torrey Pines Association, a non-profit organization that encourages public interest in the preservation of the Torrey pine tree and its habitat.

=== Activist ===
Ewing began her activism as a college student and participated in the civil rights movement in the segregated south when she was 20 years old. After moving to San Diego in 1968, she became involved with women's rights issues.

In the early 1970s, she joined the San Diego County Chapter of NOW, the National Organization for Women, and began working on the Education Task Force. As part of that organization, she worked hard in support of Title IX, an amendment to the 1965 Higher Education Act securing equal access to educational programs—including sports programs—regardless of sex, until its passage in 1972.

Ewing then began to work for the elimination of sexist and racist readers in the primary schools. As a part of that effort, Ewing served as the chair of California NOW's Education Task Force. On June 7, 1974, she wrote a guest editorial in The San Diego Union entitled, "Are California's textbooks fair to Jane?: Stereotypes Remain In Latest Materials". Under Ewing's leadership, a coalition of women's and minority groups, including California NOW, presented a report to the California State Board of Education that clearly showed that the readers being used in the primary schools contained sexist and racist themes. The coalition requested that the Board remove these readers and replace them with more appropriate texts. When the Board refused, the coalition threatened to sue it over their reluctance to enact the requested change. Eventually, the Board yielded and banned texts that had obvious sexism and racism, using criteria developed by Ewing. The new readers removed racist and sexist language and included the contributions of both men and women in all types of roles, including professional, vocational, and executive. Publishers were also forced to change the books nationwide because California was the largest buyer of textbooks in the country.

== Personal life ==
Ewing was also a strong supporter of women's rights to choose an abortion (pro-choice), and worked for passage of the Equal Rights Amendment. She also served as the President of the San Diego County Chapter of NOW from 1975 to 1976. In 1976, she founded the San Diego County Chapter of the National Women's Political Caucus, and served as its president from 1976 to 1978.

Ewing died on April 11, 2011, of chronic obstructive pulmonary disorder at the age of 80 in her home in San Diego, California.
