= Sascha Weber =

German bicycle racer (born 1988)

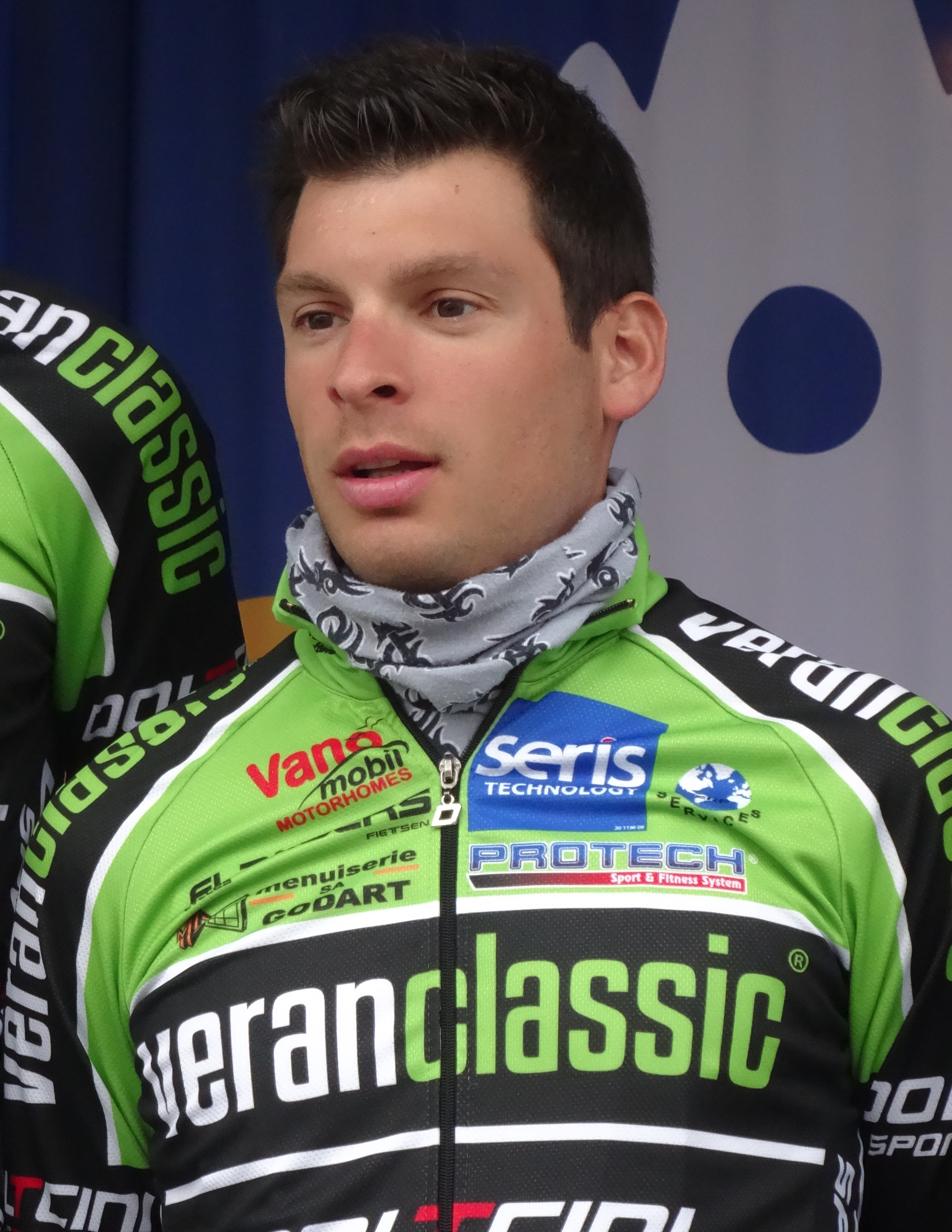
- Weber at the 2014 Four Days of Dunkirk

Personal information
- Born: 23 February 1988 (age 38) Saarbrücken, Germany

Cycling career
- Sport: Cycling
- Disciplines: Cyclo-cross; Road; Mountain biking
- Role: Rider

Amateur teams
- 2005–2007: RSC St. Wendel
- 2006: LV Saarland
- 2008: FC Rheinland-Pfalz Mainz
- 2009: RSC St. Wendel
- 2010: Harvestehuder RSV v. 1909
- 2010: Hamburg–Rheinhessen U23 Team
- 2015: Orbea–Selle SMP
- 2016: BQ Cycling Team
- 2016–2017: Focus XC
- 2016–2018: Mountainbike Freiburg
- 2017–2018: Craft Rocky Mountain Factory Team
- 2019–2020: LC Tétange
- 2021: Trek Vaude

Professional teams
- 2011–2013: Differdange–Magic–SportFood.de
- 2014: Veranclassic–Doltcini
- 2015: CCT p/b Champion System

Sascha Weber (born 23 February 1988) is a German road and cyclo-cross cyclist. He represented his nation in the men's elite event at the 2016 UCI Cyclo-cross World Championships in Heusden-Zolder.

== Major results ==
=== Cyclo-cross ===
2008–2009
1st National Under-23 Championships
2009–2010
1st National Under-23 Championships
2013–2014
1st Cyclo-cross Kayl
1st New Year's Grand Prix
3rd National Championships
2014–2015
1st Cyclocross Eschenbach, EKZ CrossTour
1st Lorsch, GGEW City Cross Cup
2015–2016
1st GP-5-Sterne-Region
1st Flückiger Cross Madiswil
2016–2017
1st Flückiger Cross Madiswil
2nd National Championships
10th World Championships
2017–2018
2nd National Championships
2018–2019
1st Internationales Radquer Steinmaur
1st Grand Prix Möbel Alvisse
1st Flückiger Cross Madiswil
3rd National Championships
2019–2020
1st Gran Premio Guerciotti

=== Road ===
2010
6th Rund um den Finanzplatz Eschborn-Frankfurt U23
2011
3rd Overall Sibiu Cycling Tour
9th Omloop van het Houtland
9th Antwerpse Havenpijl
2013
6th Grand Prix Criquielion
2015
4th Overall Flèche du Sud

=== Mountain ===
2015
3rd Marathon, European Championships
2016
2nd Marathon, National Championships
2019
1st Marathon, National Championships
