= Ralph Berner =

German cyclist (born 1968)

Personal information
- Born: 28 March 1968 (age 58) Breuberg, West Germany

Cycling career
- Sport: Cycling

Ralph Berner (born 28 March 1968) is a German former cyclist. He competed in the men's cross-country mountain biking event at the 1996 Summer Olympics. Ralph Berner finished tenth at the Atlanta Summer Olympics in 1996. He placed second in the World Championship in 1987 and 1993 while winning six national championships. In addition, he finished third in the 2004 Transalp road event and second twice at the Transalp Challenge in 2001 and 2002. Berner later rose to the position of team manager at Votec Racing Teams and managed mountain bike contests.
