= Cycling at the 2017 Island Games =

- Dates: June 24 – 30
- Host city: Gotland, Sweden
- Venue: Visby
- Level: Senior

Cycling, for the 2017 Island Games, held at Visby with the mountain bike events held at Östergravar, Visby, Gotland, Sweden in June 2017.

== Events ==
- Time Trial at Langs väg - 37km for Men and Women
- Mountain Bike Cross Country at East Moat - 3,8km course
- Road Race at Barlingbo - 115km for Men, 77km for Women
- Mountain Bike Criteriun at North Moat - three laps for Men, two for Women
- Town Criterium at The Mills - 2km course

== Medal table ==
* Host nation (Gotland)

Rank	Nation	Gold	Silver	Bronze	Total
1	Isle of Man (IOM)	5	5	3	13
2	Western Isles	4	2	0	6
3	Saare County	4	0	1	5
4	Guernsey (GUE)	2	5	2	9
5	Bermuda (BER)	1	4	2	7
6	Jersey (JEY)	1	2	8	11
7	Faroe Islands (FRO)	1	2	2	5
8	Gotland*	1	0	0	1
8	Shetland (SHE)	1	0	0	1
10	Menorca	0	0	2	2
Totals (10 entries)		20	20	20	60

== Results ==
=== Men's ===
Event	Gold		Silver		Bronze	
Time Trial	Torkil Veyhe (FRO)	46:06.61	Jack Rebours (Jersey)	47:59.57	Daniel Halksworth (Jersey)	48:59.45
Time Trial Team Event	Jersey; Sam Firby; Howard Greenside; Daniel Halksworth; Jack Rebours; Jon Woolrich	2:27:39:41	Guernsey; Simon Campbell; Jack English; Jack Hoskins; Richard Moore; Matthew Osborn	2:30:09:69	Faroe Islands; Jóhann Brend; Gunnar Dahl-Olsen; Dávur Magnussen; Jan Hjaltalin Olsen; Torkil Eyðfinsson Veyhe	2:32:28:07
Town Centre Criterium	Karl Patrick Lauk (Saaremaa)	01:00:12.78	Torkil Veyhe (FRO)	01:00:12:78	Matthew Olivera (BER)	01:00:56.04
Town Centre Criterium Team Event	Saare County; Steven Kalf; Karl Patrick Lauk; Jörgen Matt; Reimo Nook; Mihkel Räim		Bermuda; Kaden Hopkins; Dominique Mayho; Matthew Oliviera; Che'quan O'Del Richardson		Isle of Man; Thomas Bostock; Conor Davies; Matthew Draper; Adam Kelly; Robert Sorby	
Road Race	Mihkel Räim (Saaremaa)	02:39:06.00	Dávur Magnussen (FRO)	02:40:12.00	Karl Patrick Lauk (Saaremaa)	02:41:46.00
Road Race Team Event	Saare County; Steven Kalf; Karl Patrick Lauk; Jörgen Matt; Reimo Nook; Mihkel Räim		Isle of Man; Thomas Bostock; Conor Davies; Matthew Draper; Adam Kelly; Robert Sorby		Faroe Islands; Jóhann Brend; Gunnar Dahl-Olsen; Dávur Magnussen; Jan Hjaltalin Olsen; Torkil Eyðfinsson Veyhe	
Mountain Bike Cross Country	James Roe (Guernsey)	01:47:54.29	Nicholas Cortlett (Isle of Man)	01:47:54.72	Elliot Baxter (Isle of Man)	01:47:58.83
Mountain Bike Cross Country Team Event	Isle of Man; Elliott Baxter; Nicholas Corlett; Daniel Curtis; Lee Gale; Alexander Rockwell	5:24:45:87	Guernsey; Andrew Colver; Sam Culverwell; James Roe; Michael Serafin; Bradley Vaudin	5:26:56:37	Jersey; James Dilks; Rhys Hidrio; Oliver Lowthorpe; Luc Monpetit-le brun James Patterson	5:43:35:11
Mountain Bike Criterium	Nicholas Corlett (IOM)	01:01:52.0	James Roe (GGY)	01:01:53.0	Sam Culverwell (GGY)	01:02:14.0
Mountain Bike Criterium Team Event	Isle of Man; Elliott Baxter; Nicholas Corlett; Daniel Curtis; Lee Gale; Alexander Rockwell		Guernsey; Andrew Colver; Sam Culverwell; James Roe; Michael Serafin; Bradley Vaudin		Jersey; James Dilks; Rhys Hidrio; Oliver Lowthorpe; Luc Monpetit-le brun James Patterson	

=== Women's ===
Event	Gold		Silver		Bronze	
Time Trial	Christine McLean (Shetland)	57:01.33	Karina Bowie (GGY)	57:23.37	Florence Cox (JEY)	57:29.60
Time Trial Team Event	Guernsey; Karina Bowie; Danielle Hanley; Charlotte Le Lievre; Dianne Tierney; Joanna Watts	1:55:20:56	Jersey; Florence Cox; Emily Le Beuvant; Clare Treharne	1:56:02:35	Isle of Man; Carolyn Brown; Elanor Davies; Tara Ferguson; Kathryn Priest	1:59:46:43
Town Centre Criterium	Zandra Larsson (Gotland)	00:42:15	Zoenique Williams (BER)	00:42:15	Florence Cox (JEY)	00:42:15
Town Centre Criterium Team Event	Bermuda; Gabiella Arnold; Nicole Mitchell; Alyssa Rowse; Zoenique Williams		Isle of Man; Carolyn Brown; Elanor Davies; Tara Ferguson; Kathryn Priest		Jersey; Florence Coxx; Emily Le Beuvant; Jemima Leach; Indi Malzard; Clare Treharne	
Road Race	Tara Ferguson (Isle of Man)	02:04:44.30	Zoenique Williams (Bermuda)	02:04:44.30	Nicole Mitchell (Bermuda)	02:04:44.30
Road Race Team Event	Isle of Man; Carolyn Brown; Elanor Davies; Tara Ferguson; Kathryn Priest		Bermuda; Gabiella Arnold; Nicole Mitchell; Alyssa Rowse; Zoenique Williams		Guernsey; Karina Bowie; Danielle Hanley; Charlotte Le Lievre; Dianne Tierney; Joanna Watts	
Mountain Bike Cross Country	Kerry Macphee (Western Isles)	01:09:16	Kirsty Macphee (Western Isles)	01:14:49	Nùria Boch Pico (Minorca)	01:15:25
Mountain Bike Cross Country Team Event	Western Isles; Kerry Macphee; Kirsty Macphee	2:24:05	Isle of Man; Emma Atkinson; Emily Looker; Kirree Quayle	2:37:19	Jersey; Jemima Leach; Indi Malzard; Lisa Mansell; Helen Monpetit	
Mountain Bike Criterium	Kerry Macphee (Western Isles)	00:45:54.0	Kirsty Macphee (Western Isles)	00:48:32.0	Nùria Bosch Pico (Minorca)	00:49:01.0
Mountain Bike Criterium Team Event	Western Isles; Kerry Macphee; Kirsty Macphee		Isle of Man; Emma Atkinson; Emily Looker; Kirree Quayle		Jersey; Jemima Leach; Indi Malzard; Lisa Mansell; Helen Monpetit	
