= 2017 national cyclo-cross championships =

The 2017 national cyclo-cross championships were held from September through to January and are organised by the UCI member federations. They began in Australia in September 2016.

== National champions ==
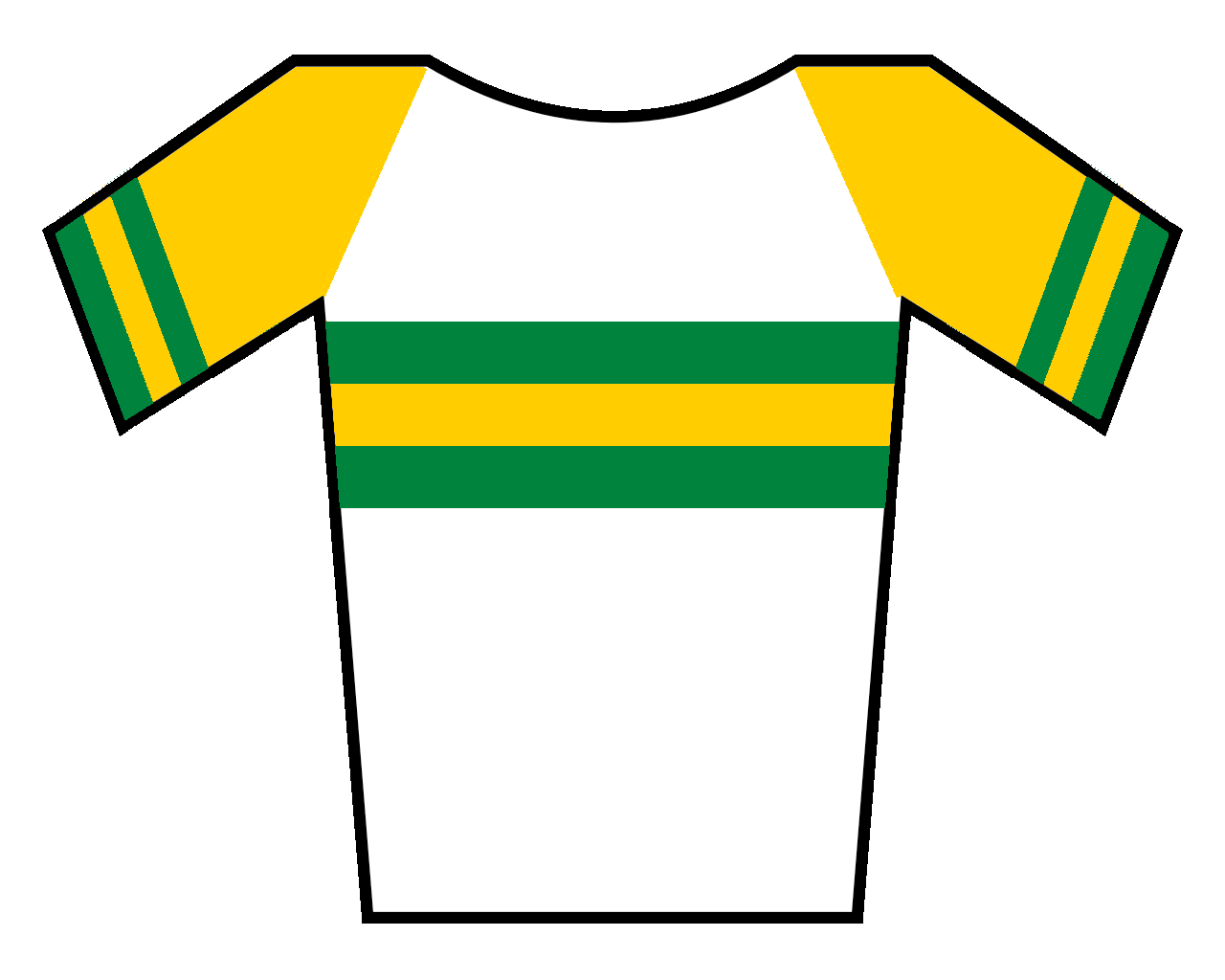
Australian Champion

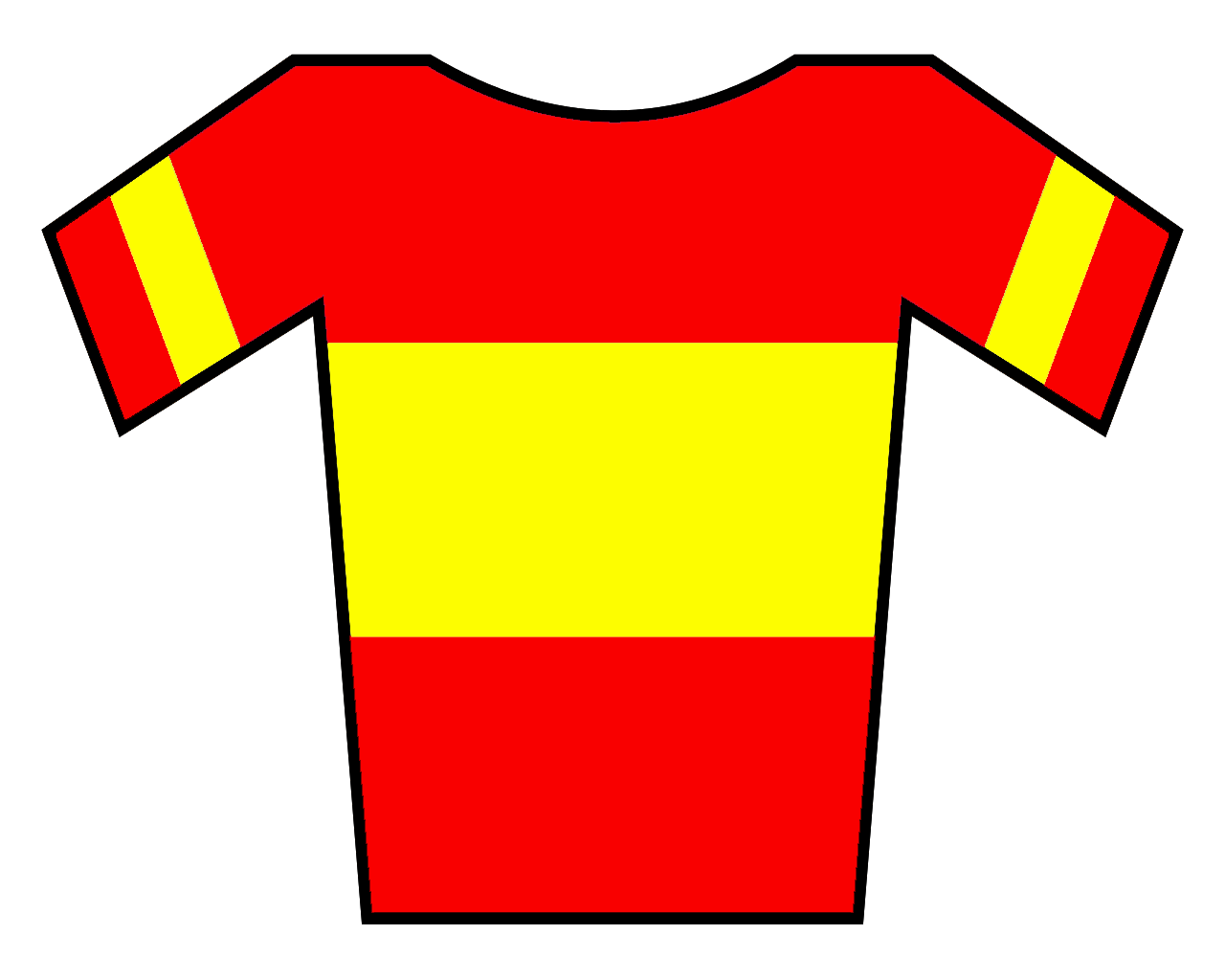
Spanish Champion

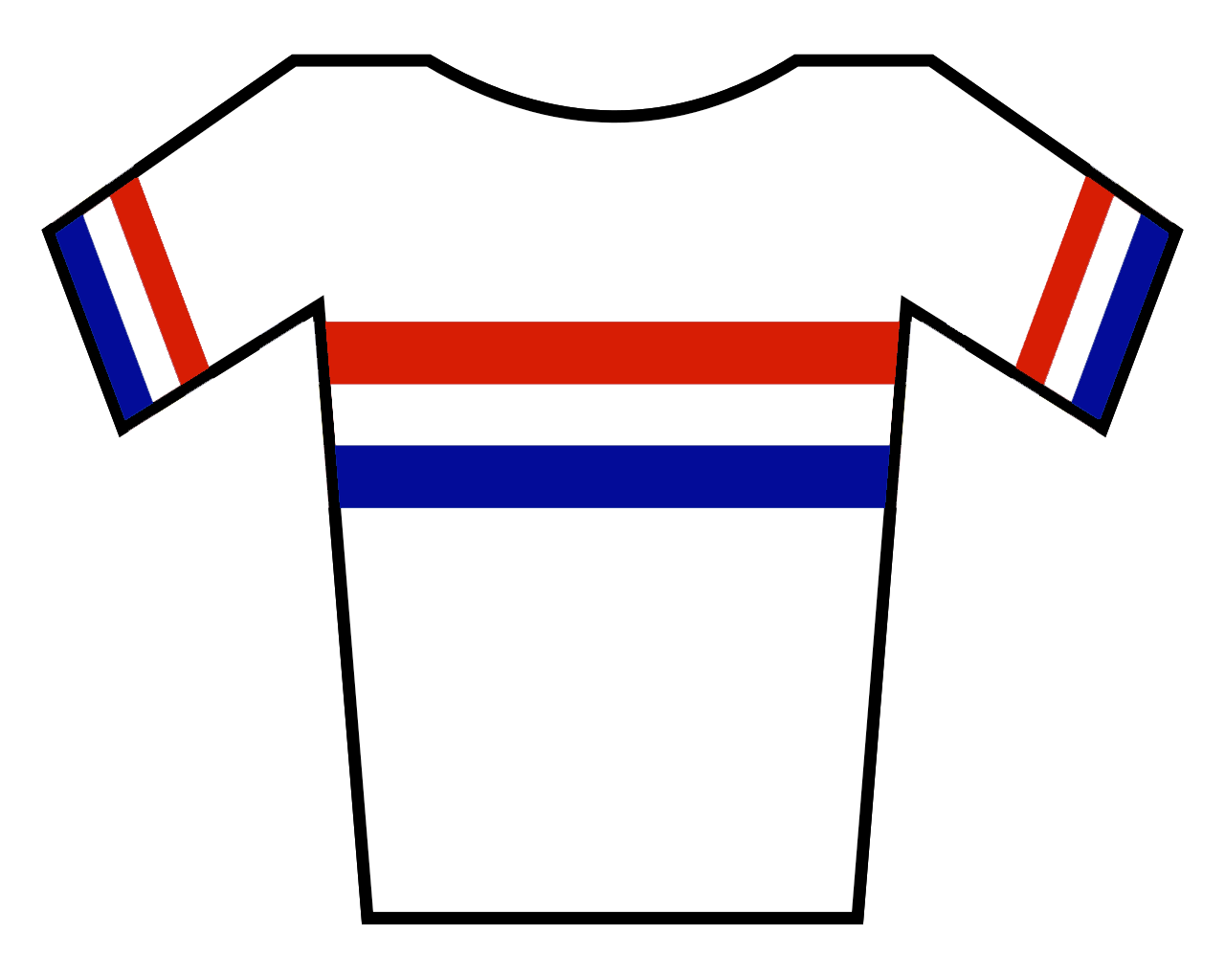
British
Champion

The winner of each national championship wears the national jersey in all their races for the next year in the respective discipline, apart from the World Championships and the Olympics, or unless they are wearing a category leader's jersey in a stage race. Most national champion jerseys tend to represent a country's flag or use the colours from it. Jerseys may also feature traditional sporting colours of a country that are not derived from a national flag, such as the green and gold on the jerseys of Australian national champions.

Country	Men's Elite Champion	Champion's Team	Women's Elite Champion	Champion's Team
Australia	Chris Jongewaard		Rebecca Locke	
Austria	Gregor Raggl		Nadja Heigl	
Belgium	Wout van Aert	Verandas Willems–Crelan	Sanne Cant	IKO Enertherm-Beobank|
Canada	Jeremy Martin		Maghalie Rochette	
Chile	Rodrigo Pérez		Valentina Monsalve Giraudo	
Czech Republic	Michael Boroš	Pauwels Sauzen–Vastgoedservice Team	Pavla Havlíková	
Denmark	Simon Lien Andreassen		Malene Degn	
Estonia	Martin Loo		Mari-Liis Mõttus	
France	Clément Venturini	Cofidis	Caroline Mani	
Germany	Marcel Meisen	Steylaerts-Betfirst	Jessica Lambracht	
United Kingdom	Ian Field	Hargroves-Ridley-Montezuma	Nikki Brammeier	Boels–Dolmans
Ireland	Roger Aiken		Beth McCluskey	
Iceland	Ingvar Omarsson		Agusta Edda Bjornsdottir	
Italy	Gioele Bertolini		Eva Lechner	
Japan	Toki Sawada		Kiyoka Sakaguchi	
Luxembourg	Scott Thiltges		Christine Majerus	Boels–Dolmans
Netherlands	Mathieu Van der Poel	Beobank–Corendon	Marianne Vos	WM3 Energie
Norway	Erik Nordsæter Resell		Elisabeth Sveum	
Portugal	Ricardo Marinheiro		Sandra dos Santos	
Poland	Marek Konwa		Magdalena Sadlecka	
Spain	Ismael Esteban Aguado		Aida Nuño Palacio	
Slovakia	Martin Haring		Janka Keseg Stevková	
Switzerland	Julien Taramarcaz	Era–Circus	Jasmin Egger-Achermann	
Sweden	David Eriksson		Jenny Rissveds	
United States	Stephen Hyde	Cannondale–Cyclocrossworld.com	Katie Compton	Trek Factory Racing

== Continental champions ==
Championship	Men's Elite Champion	Champion's Team	Women's Elite Champion	Champion's Team
European	(Belgium) Toon Aerts	Telenet Fidea Lions	(Netherlands) Thalita de Jong	Lares–Waowdeals
Pan-American	(United States) Stephen Hyde	Cannondale-Cyclocrossworld	(United States) Katie Compton	Trek Factory Racing
