= Cycling at the 2015 Island Games =

Cycling at the 2015 Island Games was held from 28 June to 2 July at 5 different Venues in Jersey

- Island Games Course, Saint Helier
- Jubilee Hill
- Tour De Bretagne Course, Saint Helier
- Peoples Park
- Saint Helier Town Centre

== Medal table ==
* Host nation (Jersey)

Rank	Nation	Gold	Silver	Bronze	Total
1	Isle of Man	7	6	2	15
2	Jersey*	6	6	4	16
3	Western Isles	4	2	0	6
4	Saare County	1	2	0	3
5	Bermuda	1	1	2	4
6	Faroe Islands	1	0	2	3
7	Guernsey	0	1	8	9
8	Menorca	0	1	1	2
8	Shetland	0	1	1	2
Totals (9 entries)		20	20	20	60

== Results ==
=== Men ===
Event	Gold		Silver		Bronze	
Individual Time Trial	Torkil Veyhe (FRO)	47.56.925	Edward Perry (IOM)	48.25.192	Nathan Draper (IOM)	48:42.636
Time Trial Team Award	Isle of Man; Tom Black; Nathan Draper; Robin Garry; Leon Mazzone; Edward Perry		Jersey; Sam Firby; Stephen Haley; Jack Rebours; Christian Spence; Richard Tanguy		Faroe Islands; Gunnar Dahl-Olsen; Bogi Kristiansen; Dávur Magnussen; Jóanis Albert Nielsen; Torkil Veyhe	
Individual Town Centre Criterium	Dominique Sidney Mayho (BER)		Nathan Draper (IOM)		Leon Mazzone (IOM)	
Team Town Centre Criterium	Isle of Man; Tom Black; Nathan Draper; Robin Garry; Leon Mazzone; Edward Perry		Saare County; Steven Kalf; Karl Patrick Lauk; Endrik Puntso; Mihkel Räim; Rigo Räim		Jersey; Sam Firby; Stephen Haley; Jack Rebours; Christian Spence; Richard Tanguy	
Individual Road Race	Mihkel Räim (Saaremaa)	2:51:19.581	Nathan Draper (IOM)	2:51:19.791	Torkil Veyhe (FRO)	2:51:20.076
Team Road Race	Isle of Man; Tom Black; Nathan Draper; Robin Garry; Leon Mazzone; Edward Perry		Saare County; Steven Kalf; Karl Patrick Lauk; Endrik Puntso; Mihkel Räim; Rigo Räim		Jersey; Sam Firby; Stephen Haley; Jack Rebours; Christian Spence; Richard Tanguy	
Individual Mountain Bike Cross Country	Nicholas Corlett (IOM)	1:49:55.901	Kamal El Hihioui (Menorca)	1:52:03.414	James Roe (GGY)	1:52:34.180
Team Mountain Bike Cross Country	Isle of Man; Elliott Baxter; Nicholas Corlett; Daniel Curtis; Joe Haddock; Robert Sorby		Jersey; Howard Greenside; Rhys Hidrio; Ollie Lowthorpe; James Patterson; Richard Payne		Menorca; Kamal El Hihioui; Diego Escudero Escriba	
Individual Mountain Bike Criterium	Nicholas Corlett (IOM)		Rhys Hidrio (JEY)		James Roe (GGY)	
Team Mountain Bike Criterium	Isle of Man; Elliott Baxter; Nicholas Corlett; Daniel Curtis; Joe Haddock; Robert Sorby		Jersey; Howard Greenside; Rhys Hidrio; Ollie Lowthorpe; James Patterson; Richard Payne		Guernsey; Andrew Colver; Geoffrey Gibson; James Roe; Michael Serafin; Danny Shaw	

=== Women ===
Event	Gold		Silver		Bronze	
Individual Time Trial	Kimberley Ashton (JEY)	55:08.040	Elizabeth Holden (IOM)	55:19.995	Christine McLean (Shetland)	57:12.657
Time Trial Team Award	Jersey; Kimberley Ashton; Laura Chillingworth; Clare Treharne		Shetland; Christine McLean; Caroline Simpson		Guernsey; Sophie Dorey; Joanna Watts	
Individual Town Centre Criterium	Kimberley Ashton (JEY)		Elizabeth Holden (IOM)		Clare Treharne (JEY)	
Team Town Centre Criterium	Jersey; Kimberley Ashton; Laura Chillingworth; Clare Treharne		Guernsey; Sophie Dorey; Joanna Watts		Bermuda; Gabriella Arnold; Karen Bordage; Zoenique Williams	
Individual Road Race	Kimberley Ashton (JEY)	1:38:50.296	Elizabeth Holden (IOM)	1:39:33.236	Gabriella Arnold (BER)	1:43:11.050
Team Road Race	Jersey; Kimberley Ashton; Laura Chillingworth; Clare Treharne		Bermuda; Gabriella Arnold; Karen Bordage; Zoenique Williams		Guernsey; Sophie Dorey; Joanna Watts	
Individual Mountain Bike Cross Country	Kerry Macphee (Western Isles)		Kirsty Macphee (Western Isles)		Helene Monpetit (JEY)	
Team Mountain Bike Cross Country	Western Isles; Kerry Macphee; Kirsty Macphee		Jersey; Jemima Leach; Catherine Liron; Helene Monpetit		Guernsey; Heather Despres; Megan Dowinton	
Individual Mountain Bike Criterium	Kerry Macphee (Western Isles)	39:27.292	Kirsty Macphee (Western Isles)	40:32.824	Meghan Dowinton (GGY)	40:55.158
Team Mountain Bike Criterium	Western Isles; Kerry Macphee; Kirsty Macphee		Jersey; Jemima Leach; Catherine Liron; Helene Monpetit		Guernsey; Heather Despres; Megan Dowinton	
