= Icelandic National Road Championships =

Annual cycling competition in Iceland

Race details
- Date: June
- Discipline: Road
- Type: One-day race

The Icelandic National Road Championships are held annually by the Icelandic Cycling Union to decide the cycling champions in both the road race and time trial discipline, across various categories.

== Men ==
=== Road race ===
Year	Winner	Second	Third
2008	Hafsteinn Ægir Geirsson	Árni Már Jónsson	Hákon Hrafn Sigurðsson
2009	Hafsteinn Ægir Geirsson	Davíð þór Sigurðsson	Pálmar Kristmundsson
2010	Davíð þór Sigurðsson	Miroslaw Zyrek	Hafsteinn Geirsson
2011	Hafsteinn Ægir Geirsson	Kári Brynjólfsson	Árni Már Jónsson
2012	Davíð þór Sigurðsson	Miroslaw Zyrek	Hafsteinn Geirsson
2013	Ingvar Ómarsson	Hafsteinn Geirsson	Árni Már Jónsson
2014	Ingvar Ómarsson	Hafsteinn Geirsson	Óskar Ómarsson
2015	Ingvar Ómarsson	Miroslaw Zyrek	Óskar Ómarsson
2016	Guðmundur Róbert Guðmundsson	Rúnar Örn Ágústsson	Rúnar Karl Elfarsson
2017	Rúnar Karl Elfarsson	Óskar Ómarsson	Hafsteinn Geirsson
2018	Ingvar Ómarsson	Hafsteinn Geirsson	Birkir Snær Ingvason
2019	Birkir Snær Ingvason	Ingvar Ómarsson	Hafsteinn Geirsson
2020	Hafsteinn Ægir Geirsson	Birkir Snær Ingvason	GuðMundur Sveinsson
2021	Ingvar Ómarsson
2022	Ingvar Ómarsson
2023	Ingvar Ómarsson

=== Time trial ===
Year	Winner	Second	Third
2008	Hafsteinn Geirsson	Gunnlaugur Jónasson	Árni Már Jónsson
2009	Hafsteinn Geirsson	Gunnlaugur Jónasson	Árni Már Jónsson
2010	Gunnlaugur Jónasson	Pétur Þór Ragnarsson	Hafsteinn Geirsson
2011	Hafsteinn Geirsson	Hákon Hrafn Sigurðsson	Kári Brynjólfsson
2012	Hákon Hrafn Sigurðsson	Hafsteinn Geirsson	Emil Tumi Viglundsson
2013	Hafsteinn Geirsson	Hákon Hrafn Sigurðsson	Árni Már Jónsson
2014	Hákon Hrafn Sigurðsson	Hafsteinn Geirsson	Ingvar Ómarsson
2015	Hákon Hrafn Sigurðsson	Bjarni Garðar Nicolaisson	Viðr Bragi þorsteinsson
2016	Bjarni Garðar Nicolaisson	Hákon Hrafn Sigurðsson	Óskar Ómarsson
2017	Hákon Hrafn Sigurðsson	Rúnar Örn Ágústsson	Hafsteinn Geirsson
2018	Rúnar Örn Ágústsson	Ingvar Ómarsson	Hafsteinn Geirsson
2019	Ingvar Ómarsson	Rúnar Örn Ágústsson	Hákon Hrafn Sigurðsson
2020	Ingvar Ómarsson	Rúnar Örn Ágústsson	Hákon Hrafn Sigurðsson
2021	Rúnar Örn Ágústsson	Ingvar Ómarsson	Hákon Hrafn Sigurðsson

== Women ==
Year	Road Race	Time Trial
2008	Bryndís Þorsteinsdóttir	Karen Axelsdóttir
2009	Eva Magret Einarsdottir	Karen Axelsdóttir
2010	Asa Gudny Asgeirsdottir	Asdis Kristjansdottir
2011	Karen Axelsdóttir	Karen Axelsdóttir
2012	Birna Björnsdottir	Birna Björnsdottir
2013	Maria Ögn Gudmundsdottir	Birna Björnsdottir
2015	Björk Kristjansdottir	Birna Björnsdottir
2016	Evgenia Ilyinskaya	Birna Björnsdottir
2017	Erla Sigurlaug Sigurdardottir	Ágústa Edda Björnsdóttir
2018	Ágústa Edda Björnsdóttir	Rannveig Anna Guicharnaud
2019	Ágústa Edda Björnsdóttir	Ágústa Edda Björnsdóttir
2020	Ágústa Edda Björnsdóttir	Ágústa Edda Björnsdóttir
2021		Ágústa Edda Björnsdóttir
