= Icelandic Cyclists' Federation =

Cycling organization in Iceland

The Icelandic Cyclists' Federation (Icelandic: Landssamtök hjólreiðamanna) (LHM) is a federation for cycling for transport, touring, leisure and sport in Iceland. It is a member of the European Cyclists' Federation, which focuses on daily utility cycling and the touring network EuroVelo. The Icelandic Cyclists' Federation was established in 1995, under the National Olympic and Sports Association of Iceland and its Sports for All project. The official name is (in Icelandic), abbreviated LHM. It has its headquarters in Reykjavík.

Two of the most active, and long-running cycling clubs in Iceland, the Icelandic mountainbike club, a club for touring and everyday cycling and the Cycling Club of Reykjavík, which focuses on training and competitions are members of the federation. Other members include the Cycling Club of Akureyri Hjólreiðafélag Akureyrar which work on various forms of sportive cycling as well as infrastructure and promotion for utility cycling, Hjólafærni á Íslandi which offers various services to further utility cycling and cycletouring on a not-for profit basis.

== Related organisations ==
- In 2008 after the financial crash a Facebook group called Samtök um bíllausan lífsstíl (which translates to "The association for a car-free lifestyle"), was formed and then turned into an organisation with an elected board. There has been some co-operation and member overlap between the two.
- In 2014 a separate Icelandic federation for sports cycling was formed, Hjólreiðasamband Íslands, which is a formal affiliate of the National Olympic and Sports Association of Iceland.
