= Nicole Mitchell =

Nicole Mitchell may refer to:

- Nicole Mitchell (cyclist) (born 1983), Bermudian road cyclist
- Nicole Mitchell (politician) (born 1974), American former politician, military officer, and meteorologist
- Nicole Mitchell (musician) (born 1967), American jazz flautist
- Nikole Mitchell (born 1974), Jamaican sprinter
- Nicola Mitchell, fictional character from EastEnders
