= 2010 UCI Mountain Bike & Trials World Championships – Men's cross-country =

Rainbow jersey

== Results – Elite ==
place	race nr	name	nat	birth	age	time
1	4	José Antonio Hermida-Ramos	Spain	24.08.1978	32	1:52:26
2	3	Jaroslav Kulhavý	Czech Republic	08.01.1985	26	+00:29
3	5	Burry Stander	South Africa	16.09.1987	23	+01:10
4	1	Nino Schurter	Switzerland	13.05.1986	24	+02:03
5	2	Julien Absalon	France	16.08.1980	30	+02:23
6	25	Carlos Coloma Nicolás	Spain	28.09.1981	29	+02:43
7	36	Liam Killeen	Great Britain	12.04.1982	28	+02:51
8	14	Geoff Kabush	Canada	14.04.1977	33	+03:58
9	6	Florian Vogel	Switzerland	18.02.1982	29	+04:14
10	40	Iván Álvarez Gutiérrez	Spain	18.12.1981	29	+04:30
11	21	Ralph Näf	Switzerland	10.05.1980	30	+04:35
12	22	Cédric Ravanel	France	26.11.1978	32	+04:57
13	30	Manuel Fumic	Germany	30.03.1982	28	+05:23
14	11	Moritz Milatz	Germany	24.06.1982	28	+05:41
15	16	Stéphane Tempier	France	05.03.1986	25	+06:37
16	29	Martin Gujan	Switzerland	16.04.1982	28	+07:42
17	9	Lukas Flückiger	Switzerland	31.01.1984	27	+07:58
18	24	Maxime Marotte	France	05.12.1986	24	+08:21
19	23	Emil Lindgren	Sweden	04.05.1985	25	+08:31
20	33	Samuel Schultz	United States	11.12.1985	25	+08:31
21	12	Todd Wells	United States	25.12.1975	35	+08:32
22	15	Fabian Giger	Switzerland	18.07.1987	23	+08:45
23	18	Jan Škarnitzl	Czech Republic	11.07.1986	24	+08:45
24	35	Tony Longo	Italy	11.09.1984	26	+09:13
25	67	Martino Fruet	Italy	21.07.1977	33	+09:23
26	39	Oliver Beckingsale	Great Britain	07.06.1976	34	+09:39
27	69	Jukka Vastaranta	Finland	29.03.1984	26	+09:45
28	28	Kohei Yamamoto	Japan	20.08.1985	25	+10:18
29	37	Adam Craig	United States	15.08.1981	29	+10:29
30	49	Catriel Andrés Soto	Argentina	29.04.1987	23	+10:37
31	17	Iñaki Lejarreta Errasti	Spain	01.09.1983	27	+10:51
32	7	Christoph Sauser	Switzerland	13.04.1976	34	+11:23
33	45	Marek Galiński	Poland	01.08.1974	36	+11:34
34	34	Jeremy Horgan-Kobelski	United States	11.08.1978	32	+11:55
35	31	Rubens Valeriano	Brazil	14.08.1979	31	+12:18
36	20	Christoph Soukup	Austria	11.10.1980	30	+12:20
37	41	Derek Zandstra	Canada	19.10.1984	26	+12:38
38	13	Sergio Mantecón Gutiérrez	Spain	25.09.1984	26	+12:55
39	38	Max Plaxton	Canada	29.05.1985	25	+13:10
40	53	Yevgeny Pechenin	Russia	14.04.1984	26	+13:16
41	54	Michael Broderick	United States	23.12.1973	37	+13:25
42	44	Karl Markt	Austria	08.03.1980	30	+14:06
43	63	Raphael Gagne	Canada	16.07.1987	23	+14:39
44	50	Maxim Gogolev	Russia	26.10.1981	29	+14:44
45	73	Matthew Hadley	Canada	07.04.1983	27	+14:48
46	8	Ruben Ruzafa-Cueto	Spain	09.09.1984	26	+15:13
47	61	Magnus Darvell	Sweden	02.06.1982	28	+16:26
48	80	Carl Decker	United States	03.06.1975	35	-1LAP
49	42	Hannes Metzler	Austria	20.05.1977	33	-1LAP
50	43	Lachlan Norris	Australia	21.01.1987	24	-1LAP
51	55	Andrea Tiberi	Italy	15.11.1985	25	-1LAP
52	48	Matouš Ulman	Czech Republic	05.06.1984	26	-1LAP
53	26	Jelmer Pietersma	Netherlands	15.05.1982	28	-1LAP
54	59	Ricardo Pscheidt	Brazil	07.09.1980	30	-1LAP
55	47	Robert Mennen	Germany	05.04.1985	25	-1LAP
56	72	Kris Sneddon	Canada	19.03.1982	28	-1LAP
57	27	Wolfram Kurschat	Germany	17.05.1975	35	-1LAP
58	51	Andrew Watson	Canada	30.05.1983	27	-2LAP
59	57	Edivando de Souza Cruz	Brazil	19.07.1978	32	-2LAP
60	58	Cristóbal Silva-Ibaceta	Chile	12.10.1979	31	-2LAP
61	56	Chun-Hing Chan	Hong Kong	24.04.1981	29	-2LAP
62	60	Rotem Ishai	Israel	07.09.1986	24	-2LAP
63	46	Sven Nys	Belgium	17.06.1976	34	-2LAP
64	78	Ignacio Torres-Acosta	Mexico	15.04.1984	26	-2LAP
65	62	Michael Northcott	New Zealand	15.02.1981	30	-2LAP
66	74	Luis Anderson Mejia-Sánchez	Colombia	09.07.1985	25	-2LAP
67	84	Zhi-Qiang Duan	China	01.04.1984	26	-2LAP
68	76	Spencer Paxson	United States	09.12.1984	26	-3LAP
69	87	Anton Gogolev	Russia	08.08.1984	26	-3LAP
70	71	Jian-Hua Ji	China	29.01.1982	29	-3LAP
71	68	Seiya Hirano	Japan	15.05.1987	23	-3LAP
72	79	Kyosuke Takei	Japan	06.11.1978	32	-3LAP
73	77	Shun Matsumoto	Japan	02.06.1976	34	-3LAP
74	70	Stuart Houltham	New Zealand	23.12.1979	31	-3LAP
75	81	Hector Daniel Gasco	Argentina	19.06.1985	25	-3LAP
76	83	Ryo Saito	Japan	30.09.1980	30	-3LAP
77	75	Emmanuel Valencia	Mexico	24.12.1983	27	-4LAP
78	82	Hector Fernando Riveros-Paez	Colombia	27.12.1987	23	-4LAP
79	65		Australia	09.06.1979	31	-4LAP
80	88	Eudaldo Asencio	Puerto Rico	19.07.1977	33	-4LAP
	19	Rudi Van Houts	Netherlands	16.01.1984	27	DNF0
	66	Dario Alejandro Gasco	Argentina	20.01.1987	24	DNF1
	10	Marco Aurelio Fontana	Italy	12.10.1984	26	DNF3
	52	Michal Lami	Slovakia	12.08.1986	24	DNF3
	32	Jochen Kass	Germany	05.05.1981	29	DNF4

== Results – U23 ==
place	race nr	name	nat	birth	age	time
1	2	Mathias Flückiger	Switzerland	27.09.1988	21	1:45:15
2	6	Thomas Litscher	Switzerland	14.05.1989	20	+00:30
3	10	Patrik Gallati	Switzerland	01.04.1988	22	+01:04
4	3	Alexis Vuillermoz	France	01.06.1988	21	+01:49
5	12	Gerhard Kerschbaumer	Italy	19.07.1991	18	+03:28
6	4	Marek Konwa	Poland	11.03.1990	20	+03:37
7	7	Martin Fanger	Switzerland	28.03.1988	22	+03:53
8	40	Ruben Scheire	Belgium	06.12.1991	18	+04:25
9	5	Henk Jaap Moorlag	Netherlands	08.05.1990	19	+04:37
10	26	Pascal Meyer	Switzerland	16.02.1988	22	+04:59
11	15	Fabien Canal	France	04.04.1989	20	+05:20
12	11	Niels Wubben	Netherlands	20.02.1988	22	+05:37
13	22	Piotr Brzozka	Poland	14.10.1989	20	+06:46
14	20	David Fletcher	Great Britain	27.02.1989	21	+06:59
15	14	Marco Minnaard	Netherlands	11.04.1989	20	+07:25
16	21	Mattias Wengelin	Sweden	02.02.1988	22	+07:37
17	8	Sebastien Carabin	Belgium	28.03.1989	21	+07:51
18	28	Tiago Jorge Oliveira-Ferreira	Portugal	07.12.1988	21	+08:09
19	35	Sergey Nikolayev	Russia	05.02.1988	22	+09:25
20	52	Thomas Lapeyrie	France	11.04.1990	19	+09:34
21	31	Samuele Porro	Italy	15.05.1988	21	+09:47
22	45	Marcel Fleschhut	Germany	01.06.1990	19	+09:52
23	38	Felix Euteneuer	Germany	13.03.1989	21	+09:58
24	27	Philip Buys	South Africa	30.09.1988	21	+10:01
25	42	Severin Disch	Switzerland	05.02.1988	22	+10:23
26	17	Alexander Gehbauer	Austria	24.04.1990	19	+10:53
27	58	Andy Eyring	Germany	05.04.1989	20	+11:01
28	39	Ricardo Paulo Reis-Marinheiro	Portugal	05.11.1991	18	+11:23
29	24	Martin Loo	Estonia	09.04.1988	21	+11:34
30	23	Markus Bauer	Germany	24.08.1989	20	+12:08
31	16	Sherman Paiva	Brazil	15.05.1989	20	+12:25
32	25	Robbie Squire	United States	01.04.1990	20	+12:37
33	41	Cristian Cominelli	Italy	22.05.1988	21	+12:41
34	50	Stephen Ettinger	United States	28.04.1989	20	+12:44
35	56	Zhen Wang	China	26.06.1989	20	+12:49
36	30	Dirk Peters	New Zealand	13.04.1991	18	+12:57
37	18	Shlomi Haimy	Israel	19.06.1989	20	+13:46
38	66	Jaime Yesid Chia	Colombia	25.01.1990	20	+13:49
39	33	Carl Jones	New Zealand	07.06.1988	21	+14:01
40	55	Mitch Hoke	United States	14.03.1988	22	+14:32
41	29	Rodrigo Adrian Darnay	Argentina	29.08.1989	20	+14:54
42	49	Markus Schulte-Luenzum	Germany	16.07.1991	18	+15:09
43	19	Zsolt Juhasz	Hungary	24.07.1990	19	+15:33
44	53	Francis Morin	Canada	22.06.1989	20	+15:58
45	61	Jack Hinkens	United States	31.07.1991	18	-1LAP
46	46	Yu Takenouchi	Japan	01.09.1988	21	-1LAP
47	51	Fabian Strecker	Germany	16.04.1990	19	-1LAP
48	57	Simon Lalancette	Canada	07.06.1990	19	-1LAP
49	62	Tyson Wagler	Canada	21.08.1991	18	-1LAP
50	44	David Lozano-Riba	Spain	21.12.1988	21	-1LAP
51	63	Andrew l'Esperance	Canada	18.03.1991	19	-2LAP
52	37	Russell Finsterwald	United States	18.09.1991	18	-2LAP
53	34	Tomáš Pešek	Czech Republic	04.01.1989	21	-2LAP
54	65	Sébastien Cadieux-Duval	Canada	14.07.1990	19	-2LAP
55	32	Cal Britten	Australia	17.03.1988	22	-2LAP
56	70	Oleksandr Kachanov	Ukraine	05.04.1988	21	-2LAP
57	48	Frederico Mariano	Brazil	16.07.1991	18	-3LAP
58	54	Keisuke Goda	Japan	27.07.1990	19	-4LAP
	9	Henrique Avancini	Brazil	30.03.1989	21	DNF1
	60	Félix Cote	Canada	29.09.1988	21	DNF1
	47	Jared Stafford	Canada	08.04.1991	18	DNF2
	43	Rafael Escarcega-Salazar	Mexico	24.04.1989	20	DNF2
	59	Jose Maria Sanchez-Ruiz	Spain	13.11.1991	18	DNF3
	36	Ondřej Cink	Czech Republic	07.12.1990	19	DNF5
	13	Jelmer Jubbega	Netherlands	04.07.1988	21	DNF5
	67	Diego Arias	Colombia	09.02.1988	22	DNS

== Results – Junior ==
place	race nr	name	nat	birth	age	time
1	54	Michiel van der Heijden	Netherlands	03.01.1992	19	1:33:54
2	41	Julien Trarieux	France	19.08.1992	18	+01:48
3	8	Julian Schelb	Germany	20.11.1992	18	+02:14
4	6	Maximilian Vieider	Italy	13.04.1992	18	+02:35
5	14	Jeff Luyten	Belgium	09.10.1992	18	+02:39
6	44	Marvin Gruget	France	02.07.1992	18	+03:06
7	2	Roger Walder	Switzerland	13.02.1992	19	+03:38
8	42	Alrick Martin	France	31.01.1992	19	+04:06
9	27	Evan McNeely	Canada	01.04.1992	18	+04:07
10	29	Antoine Caron	Canada	08.01.1992	19	+04:10
11	37	James Reid	South Africa	01.08.1992	18	+05:01
12	38	Luke Roberts	South Africa	27.04.1993	17	+05:25
13	45	Jordan Sarrou	France	09.12.1992	18	+05:36
14	34	Tomáš Paprstka	Czech Republic	01.03.1992	19	+05:38
15	46	Grant Ferguson	Great Britain	15.11.1993	17	+05:55
16	24	Cameron Ivory	Australia	26.04.1992	18	+06:11
17	43	Maxime Urruty	France	21.05.1993	17	+06:19
18	49	Seth Kemp	United States	22.03.1992	18	+06:19
19	13	Jens Schuermans	Belgium	13.02.1993	18	+06:32
20	10	Sascha Bleher	Germany	01.09.1992	18	+06:41
21	4	Fabian Paumann	Switzerland	04.11.1992	18	+07:19
22	3	Claude Koster	Switzerland	26.04.1992	18	+07:31
23	55	Gregor Raggl	Austria	08.02.1992	19	+07:46
24	31	Jeremy Martin	Canada	25.05.1992	18	+07:48
25	56	Jonas Pedersen	Denmark	06.06.1992	18	+07:57
26	62	František Lami	Slovakia	12.12.1993	17	+08:04
27	74	Ole Hem	Norway	24.04.1992	18	+08:10
28	32	Leandre Bouchard	Canada	20.10.1992	18	+08:15
29	11	Lukas Kuch	Germany	10.06.1992	18	+08:19
30	50	Skyler Trujillo	United States	07.10.1992	18	+08:22
31	30	Mitchell Bailey	Canada	15.02.1992	19	+08:40
32	20	Brad Hudson	New Zealand	16.11.1992	18	+08:54
33	73	Pablo Rodríguez-Guede	Spain	24.06.1993	17	+08:56
34	15	Bart de Vocht	Belgium	29.06.1992	18	+09:29
35	47	Kenta Gallagher	Great Britain	22.06.1992	18	+09:36
36	68	Luis Rojas	Argentina	29.05.1993	17	+09:40
37	33	Etienne Moreau	Canada	29.05.1992	18	+10:13
38	64	Nicolas Prudencio	Chile	22.05.1992	18	+10:32
39	36	Arno du Toit	South Africa	13.01.1993	18	+10:33
40	35	Radek Polnický	Czech Republic	17.03.1992	18	+10:35
41	40	Tomas Kristoffersson	Sweden	01.03.1992	19	+10:52
42	26	Kyle Ward	Australia	22.02.1992	19	+11:13
43	65	Luiz Cocuzzi	Brazil	02.08.1993	17	+11:50
44	75	Tobias Sæther	Norway	24.07.1992	18	+11:51
45	18	Pieter Geluykens	Belgium	12.07.1993	17	+12:13
46	5	Stefan Peter	Switzerland	10.04.1992	18	+12:21
47	63	Jozef Bebčák	Slovakia	20.10.1993	17	+12:29
48	69	Anton Stepanov	Russia	20.03.1992	18	+12:44
49	51	Tony Smith	United States	10.05.1993	17	+13:41
50	12	Christian Pfäffle	Germany	08.05.1993	17	+13:43
51	16	Jens Vandekinderen	Belgium	30.04.1993	17	+13:48
52	39	Urban Ferenčák	Slovakia	09.01.1992	19	+14:02
53	7	Denny Lupato	Italy	05.07.1992	18	+14:26
54	21	Locky McArthur	New Zealand	08.08.1992	18	+14:55
55	67	Kevin Ingratta	Argentina	11.06.1993	17	+17:17
56	61	Shaked Frank	Israel	17.07.1992	18	-1LAP
57	17	Olivier Bruwiere	Belgium	28.11.1992	18	-1LAP
58	53	Will Curtis	United States	01.09.1992	18	-1LAP
59	78	Anton Lyubyy	Ukraine	21.03.1992	18	-1LAP
60	70	Artem Alexandrov	Russia	17.04.1993	17	-1LAP
61	76	Sturla Aune	Norway	08.06.1992	18	-1LAP
62	57	Sebastian Gómez-Rojas	Colombia	30.04.1992	18	-1LAP
63	58	Miguel Londono-Naranjo	Colombia	23.02.1993	18	-1LAP
64	66	Gergo Meggyesi	Hungary	18.07.1993	17	-2LAP
65	71	Idomu Yamamoto	Japan	03.02.1992	19	-2LAP
	22	Mathew Waghorn	New Zealand	24.05.1993	17	DNF0
	23	Mitchell Codner	Australia	05.07.1992	18	DNF1
	52	Zachary Valdez	United States	06.03.1992	18	DNF1
	28	Steven Noble	Canada	24.01.1992	19	DNF2
	72	Antonio Santos-Ridao	Spain	08.02.1993	18	DNF2
	9	Wenzel Böhm-Gräber	Germany	31.03.1992	18	DNF3
	48	Steven James	Great Britain	09.07.1992	18	DNF3
	60	Carlos Enrique Moran-Manzo	Mexico	04.03.1992	18	DNF3
	25	Trenton Day	Australia	28.04.1992	18	DNF5
	19	Richard Anderson	New Zealand	29.12.1992	18	DNS

== See also ==
UCI Mountain Bike & Trials World Championships
