= 2016 Danmark Rundt =

2016 UCI Europe Tour

Race details
- Dates: 27–31 July 2016
- Stages: 5
- Distance: 758.7 km (471.4 mi)
- Winning time: 16h 41' 35"

Results
Jersey awarded to the overall winner	Winner	Michael Valgren (DEN)	(Tinkoff)
	Second	Magnus Cort (DEN)	(Denmark)
	Third	Mads Würtz Schmidt (DEN)	(Team Virtu Pro–Véloconcept)
Jersey awarded to the points classification winner	Points	Daniele Bennati (ITA)	
Jersey awarded to the mountains classification winner	Mountains	Aimé De Gendt (BEL)	(Topsport Vlaanderen–Baloise)
Jersey awarded to the young rider classification winner	Young rider	Mads Würtz Schmidt (DEN)	(Team Virtu Pro–Veloconcept)
	Team	Tinkoff	

The 2016 Danmark Rundt (officially PostNord Danmark Rundt 2016 for sponsorship reasons) was a men's road bicycle race which was held from 27 July to 31 July 2016. It was the 26th edition of Danmark Rundt, which was established in 1985. The race was rated as a 2.HC event and formed part of the 2016 UCI Europe Tour. The race was made up of five stages over five days and included an individual time trial.

== Teams ==
A total of 16 teams with 8 riders each raced in the 2016 Danmark Rundt: 3 UCI WorldTeams, 8 UCI Professional Continental teams, 4 UCI Continental Teams along with a Danish national team under the Team Postnord Danmark name. PostNord was the name sponsor of the race.

World Tour teams

- Tinkoff
- LottoNL–Jumbo
- Astana

Professional Continental teams

- Bora–Argon 18
- Stölting Service Group
- Wanty–Groupe Gobert
- ONE Pro Cycling
- Bardiani–CSF
- Topsport Vlaanderen–Baloise
- Team Novo Nordisk
- Roompot–Oranje Peloton

Continental teams

- Team Coop–Øster Hus
- Team Almeborg–Bornholm
- Riwal Platform
- Team Virtu Pro–Véloconcept

National team

- Team PostNord Danmark

== Schedule ==
There were five stages over five days with an individual time trial on day four.

Stage	Date	Route	Distance	Type	Stage winner
1	27 July	Herning to Esbjerg	200 km (120 mi)	Flat stage	Daniele Bennati (ITA)
2	28 July	Rømø to Sønderborg	180 km (110 mi)	Flat stage	Magnus Cort Nielsen (DEN)
3	29 July	Aabenraa to Vejle	175 km (109 mi)	Hilly stage	Michael Valgren (DEN)
4	30 July	Nyborg	20 km (12 mi)	Individual time trial	Mads Würtz Schmidt (DEN)
5	31 July	Karrebæksminde to Frederiksberg	175 km (109 mi)	Flat stage	Phil Bauhaus (GER)

== Classifications ==
Final general classification

Rank	Rider	Team	Time
1	Michael Valgren (DEN)	Tinkoff	16h 41' 35"
2	Magnus Cort (DEN)	Denmark	+ 10"
3	Mads Würtz Schmidt (DEN)	Team Virtu Pro–Véloconcept	+ 57"
4	Michael Gogl (AUT)	Tinkoff	+ 1' 21"
5	Christoph Pfingsten (GER)	Bora–Argon 18	+ 1' 22"
6	Gijs Van Hoecke (BEL)	Topsport Vlaanderen–Baloise	+ 1' 33"
7	Alexander Kamp (DEN)	Stölting Service Group	+ 1' 41"
8	Laurens De Vreese (BEL)	Astana	+ 1' 42"
9	Marco Marcato (ITA)	Wanty–Groupe Gobert	+ 1' 44"
10	Manuele Boaro (ITA)	Tinkoff	+ 1' 46"

== Classification leadership ==
Stage	Winner	General classification	Points classification	Mountains classification	Young rider classification	Fighter competition	Team classification
1	Daniele Bennati	Daniele Bennati	Daniele Bennati	Mike Teunissen	Mads Würtz Schmidt	Mike Teunissen	Tinkoff
2	Magnus Cort	Daniele Bennati	Daniele Bennati	Mike Teunissen	Mads Würtz Schmidt	Tom Baylis	Tinkoff
3	Michael Valgren	Michael Valgren	Daniele Bennati	Nicolai Brøchner	Giulio Ciccone	Torkil Veyhe	Wanty–Groupe Gobert
4	Mads Würtz Schmidt	Michael Valgren	Mads Würtz Schmidt	Nicolai Brøchner	Mads Würtz Schmidt	n/a	Tinkoff
5	Phil Bauhaus	Michael Valgren	Daniele Bennati	Aimé De Gendt	Mads Würtz Schmidt	Lars Boom	Tinkoff
