= Bermudan National Road Championships =

National road cycling championships in Bermuda

Race details
- Date: June
- Discipline: Road
- Type: One-day race

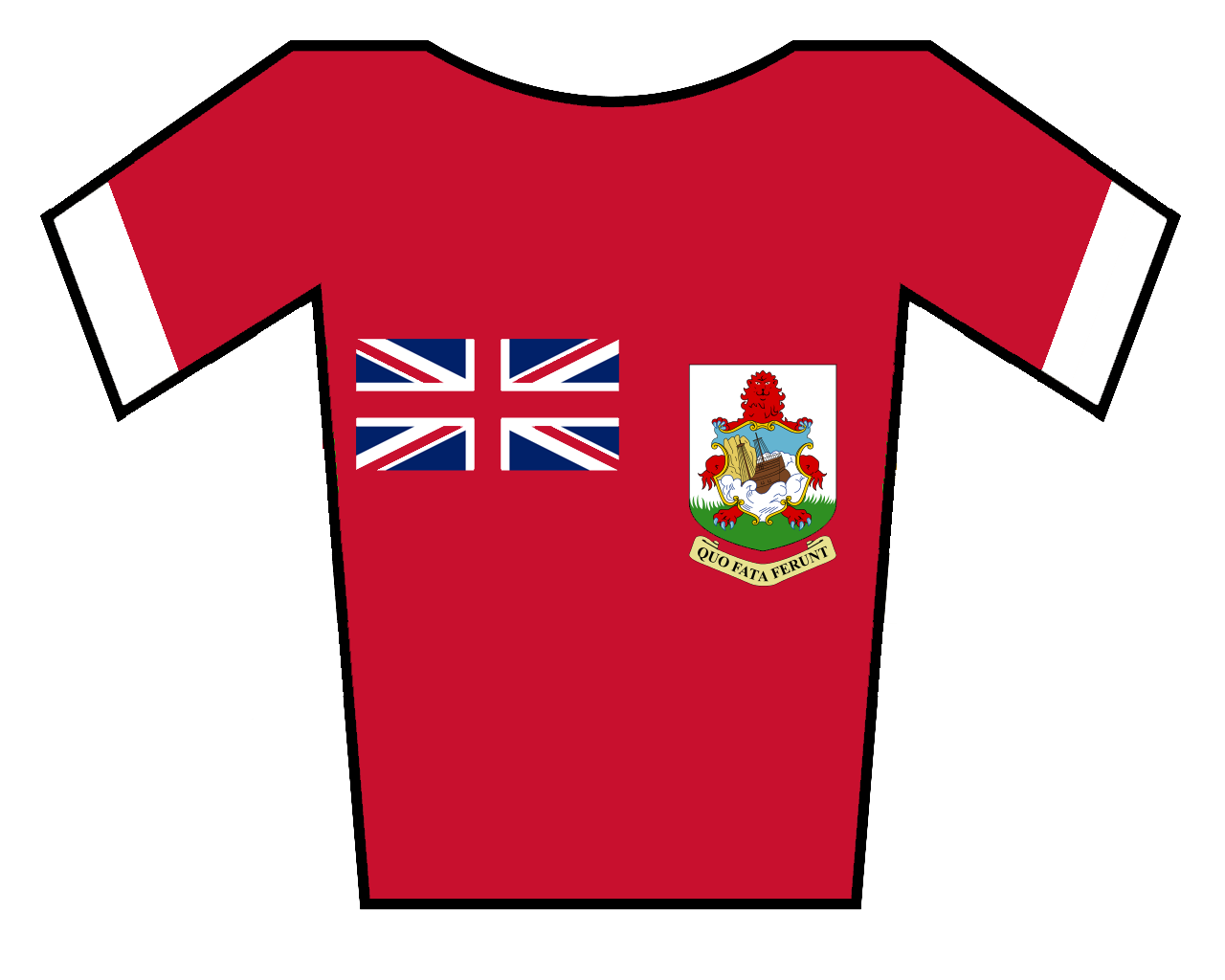

The Bermudan National Road Championships are held annually to decide the cycling champions in both the road race and time trial discipline, across various categories.

== Men ==
=== Road race ===
Year	Winner	Second	Third
2004	Wayne Scott	Ricky Sousa Sr	Gart Thomson
2006	Wayne Scott	Gart Thomson	Mark Hatherley
2007	Tyler Butterfield	Gart Thomson	Wayne Scott
2008	Geri Bryan Mewett	Gart Thomson	Mark Hatherley
2009	Scott Williams	Gart Thomson	Mark Hatherley
2010	Geri Bryan Mewett	Scott Williams	Mark Lombardi
2011	Darren Glasford	Chris Faria	Mark Hatherley
2012	Dominique Mayho	Ian Port	Mark Hatherley
2013	Dominique Mayho	Shannon Lawrence	Darren Glasford
2014	Shannon Lawrence	Adam Harbutt	Darren Glasford
2015	Dominique Mayho	Shannon Lawrence	Anthony Bartley
2016	Dominique Mayho	Mark Hatherley	Anthony Bartley
2017	Dominique Mayho	Gary Raynor	Che'quan Richardson
2018	Dominique Mayho	Conor White	Jamie Cousins
2019	Dominique Mayho	Conor White	Kaden Hopkins
2020	Tyler Smith	Kaden Hopkins	Conor White
2021	Dominique Mayho	Conor White	Kaden Hopkins
2022	Conor White	Kaden Hopkins	Alexander Pilgrim
2023	Kaden Hopkins	Conor White	Nicholas Narraway

=== Time trial ===
Year	Winner	Second	Third
2007	Wayne Scott	Kris Hedges	Greg Hopkins
2008	Gart Thomson	Wayne Scott	Grant Goudge
2009	Gart Thomson	Neil De Sainte Croix	Kent Richardson
2010	Gart Thomson	Neil De Sainte Croix	Shannon Lawrence
2011	Neil De Sainte Croix	Darren Glasford	Kent Richardson
2012	Dominique Mayho	Mark Hatherley	Darren Glasford
2013	Shannon Lawrence	Neil De Sainte Croix	Mark Hatherley
2014	Shannon Lawrence	Mark Hatherley	Anthony Bartley
2015	Shannon Lawrence	Anthony Bartley	Darren Glasford
2016	Tyler Butterfield	Neil De Sainte Croix	Anthony Bartley
2017	Dominique Mayho	Anthony Bartley	Tyler Butterfield
2018	Conor White	Dominique Mayho	Adam Kirk
2019	Kaden Hopkins	Conor White	Geoff Smith
2020	Kaden Hopkins	Conor White	Tyler Smith
2021	Kaden Hopkins	Conor White	Kris Hedges
2022	Conor White	Kaden Hopkins	Liam Flannery
2023	Kaden Hopkins	Conor White	Jamie Cousins

== Women ==
Year	Road Race	Time Trial
2007	Deanna McMullen-Thompson	Ashley Robinson
2008		
2009	Deanna McMullen-Thompson	Deanna McMullen-Thompson
2010	Sarah Bonnett	Deanna McMullen-Thompson
2011	Karen Bordage	Karen Bordage
2012	Nicole Mitchell	Nicole Mitchell
2013	Karen Bordage	Nicole Mitchell
2014	Nicole Mitchell	Nicole Mitchell
2015	Karen Bordage	Karen Bordage
2016	Karen Bordage	Karen Smith
2017	Nicole Mitchell	Ashley Estwanik
2018	Nicole Mitchell	Caitlyn Conyers
2019	Caitlyn Conyers	Caitlyn Conyers
2020		Caitlyn Conyers
2021	Caitlin Conyers	Nicole Mitchell
2022	Caitlin Conyers	Nicole Mitchell
2023	Caitlin Conyers	Caitlin Conyers
