= Great War Remembrance Race =

Race details
- Date: End of August
- Region: Belgium and France
- English name: Great War Remembrance Race
- Discipline: Road
- Competition: UCI Europe Tour
- Type: One-day
- Organiser: Flanders Classics & organisers of Gent–Wevelgem
- Web site: www.greatwarremembrancerace.be/en

History
- First edition: 2018
- Editions: 1
- Final edition: 2018
- First winner: Mihkel Räim (EST)
- Most wins: No repeat winners
- Final winner: Mihkel Räim (EST)

The Great War Remembrance Race was a European single-day cycle race to be held annually from 2018 which passed through the Belgian province of West Flanders, organized by Flanders Classics and the organizers of Gent–Wevelgem as a 1.1 event on the UCI Europe Tour. The inaugural edition marked the 100th anniversary of the end of World War I and was held on 24 August 2018 and won by Mihkel Räim. Further editions were intended to safeguard continuing awareness of this historic war.

Future editions of the race were canceled in June, 2019. The organizers cited calendar conflicts and similarities to other races in their decision to not continue the race.

== Winners ==
Year	Country	Rider	Team
2018	Estonia	Mihkel Räim	Israel Cycling Academy
