= Conor White =

Bermudian cyclist (born 1999)

Personal information
- Born: 19 October 1999 (age 26) Hamilton, Bermuda
- Height: 1.93 m (6 ft 4 in)
- Weight: 80 kg (176 lb)

Cycling career
- Sport: Cycling
- Current team: Jakroo Handsling Racing
- Discipline: Road and Track
- Role: Rider

Amateur teams
- 2022: CS Velo Racing
- 2023–2024: Austin Aviators
- 2025: Muc-Off-SRCT-Storck
- 2026-: Jakroo Handsling Racing

Professional team
- 2021: XSpeed United Continental

Major wins
- One-day races and Classics Caribbean Time Trial Championships (2023, 2024) National Road Race Championships (2022, 2025) National Time Trial Championships (2018, 2022)
Medal record
Representing Bermuda
Pan American Championships
| Gold medal – first place | 2026 Santiago | Scratch race |
Pan American Games
| Bronze medal – third place | 2023 Santiago | Time trial |
Central American and Caribbean Games
| Silver medal – second place | 2023 San Salvador | Time trial |

Conor White (born 19 October 1999) is a Bermudian road and track cyclist, who currently rides for United Kingdom amateur team Jakroo Handsling Racing. Known for his strength in time trials and road racing. He has represented Bermuda in various international competitions, including the Commonwealth Games, Pan Am Games, Central American and Caribbean Games, and the UCI Road World Championships. White has also competed in elite road races and stage events, showcasing his climbing ability and time-trial prowess. His performances on the North American and international circuits have established him as one of Bermuda's top cyclists, earning podium finishes and national titles. As he continues to develop in the sport, White remains a key figure in Bermudian cycling, inspiring young riders from the island.

== Major results ==
2017
3rd Time trial, National Junior Road Championships
2018
National Road Championships

1st Time trial
3rd Road race

5th Time trial, Caribbean Road Championships
9th Road race, Caribbean Under-23 Road Championships
2019
2nd Road race, National Road Championships
2nd Time trial, National Under-23 Road Championships
2020
National Road Championships

2nd Time trial
3rd Road race

2021
1st Time trial, Caribbean Under-23 Road Championships
2nd Road race, National Road Championships
2nd Time trial, National Under-23 Road Championships
7th Time trial, Junior Pan American Games
9th Road race, Caribbean Road Championships
2022
National Road Championships

1st Road race
1st Time trial

3rd Snake Alley Criterium
7th Time trial, Caribbean Road Championships
2023
Caribbean Road Championships

1st Time trial
4th Road race

National Road Championships

2nd Road race
2nd Time trial

1st Overall Valley of the Sun Stage Race

1st Stage 2

3rd Time trial, Pan American Games
Central American and Caribbean Games

2nd Time trial
9th Road race

6th Time trial, Pan American Championships
