= Tour of Faroe Islands =

Road cycling race held in the Faroe Islands

Kring Føroyar
Race details
- Date: May / July
- Region: Faroe Islands
- English name: Tour of Faroe Islands
- Local name: Kring Føroyar
- Discipline: Road
- Competition: Elite and amateur
- Type: Stage race
- Organiser: Tórshavnar Súkklufelag

History
- First edition: 1997
- Editions: 23 (as of 2022)
- First winner: Bogi Kristiansen (FRO)
- Most wins: Torkil Veyhe (FRO)(6)
- Most recent: Jákup Petur Eliassen (FRO)

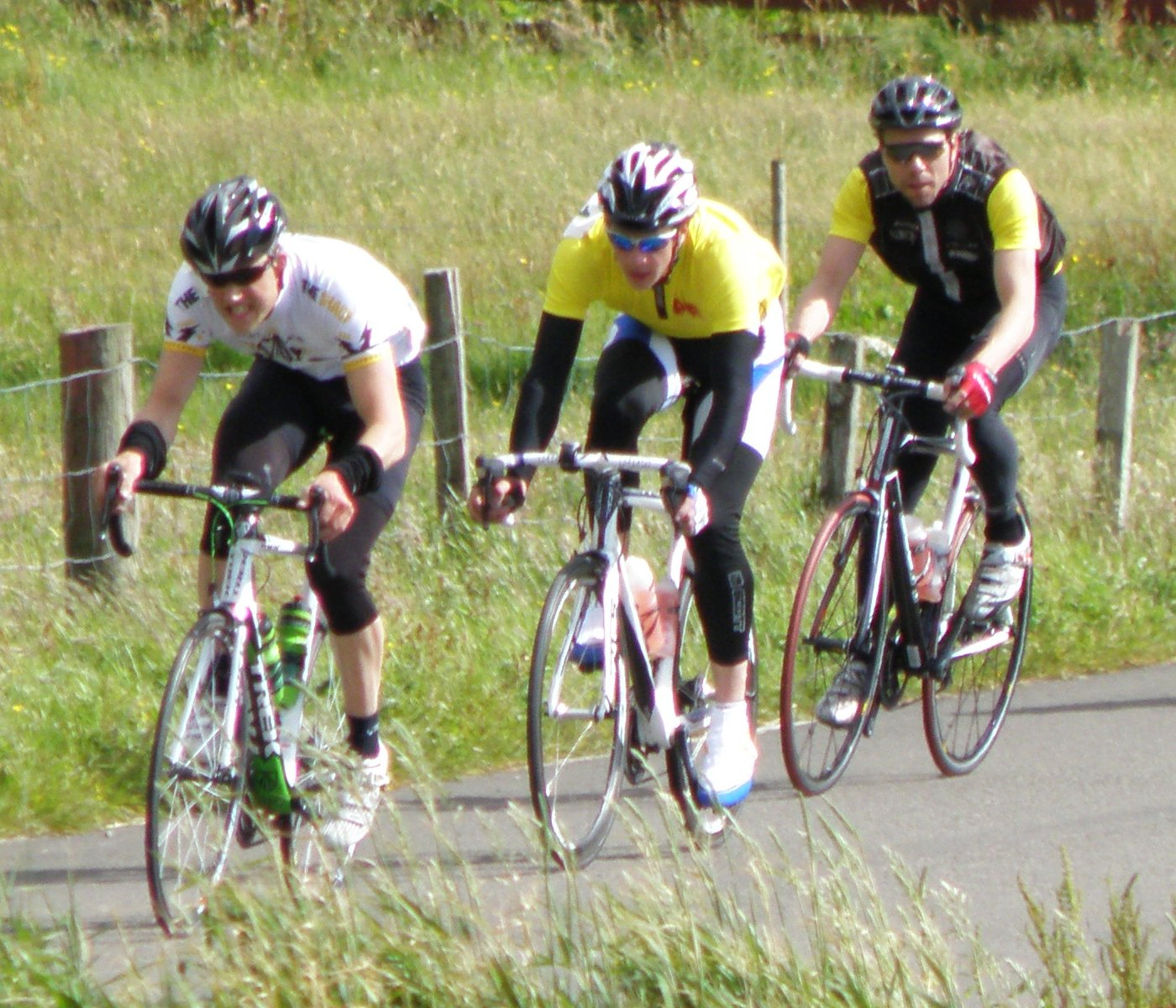

The Tour of Faroe Islands (Faroese: Kring Føroyar) is a road cycling race held in the Faroe Islands. The race consists of a men's, women's and juniors' competition over a prologue and four or five stages, which are for elite cyclists and shorter distances for non-elite cyclists. From 2011 to 2013, the race was changed to four stages in three days. The first edition of the Kring Føroyar tour was held in 1996 but it was not an official race; the 1997 Tour was the first official edition of the race. The race is normally held in July shortly before Ólavsøka. In 2012 the race was held from 20 July to 22 July. The last day of the race is held in Tórshavn, and the roads are closed for traffic on that day. In 2015 the race will be held from 22 to 26 July. For sponsor reasons the name of the tour was Statoil Kring Føroyar, and later when the Faroese company changed its name from Statoil to Effo, the tour was called Effo Kring Føroyar. In 2014 the race got a new main sponsor and the name was changed to Volvo Kring Føroyar. As of 2015, the length of the race is 430 kilometres (270 mi) for elite cyclists and 230 kilometres (140 mi) for youth and senior cyclists.

The 2015 Tour of Faroe Islands started on 22 July in Tórshavn and ends also in Tórshavn five days later on 26 July. The route was as follows: Day 1: Tórshavn-Runavík (from Streymoy to Eysturoy), day 2: Klaksvík-Sornfelli (from Borðoy to a mountain on Streymoy), day 3: Sandur-around the island Sandoy-Sandur, day 4: Suðuroy, starting end ending at the Effo-station in Tvøroyri, the final day: starting and ending at Wenzel in Tórshavn. The road racers at the 2015 tour come from the Faroe Islands, Iceland and Denmark. The winner of stage 1, 2 and 3 of the 2015 tour was Torkil Veyhe, the winner of stage 4 was Dávur Magnussen, who also won the mountain jersey for stage 4 which was in Suðuroy. Torkil Veyhe won the 2015 Tour of Faroe Islands, it took him 12 hours 51 minutes to race the 460 km route, Guðmundur Joensen was runner-up and Bjarke Vodder Nielsen took bronze. Dávur Magnussen won the mountain-jersey.

== Past winners ==
Year	Winner	Second	Third
1997	(Faroe Islands) Bogi Kristiansen	(Faroe Islands) Rógvi Johansen	(Faroe Islands) Gunnar Dahl-Olsen
1998	(Faroe Islands) Bogi Kristiansen	(Faroe Islands) Gunnar Dahl-Olsen	(Faroe Islands) Sverri M. Edvinsson
1999	(Faroe Islands) Rógvi Johansen	(Faroe Islands) Bogi Kristiansen	(Denmark) Keld Petersen
2000	(Faroe Islands) Rógvi Johansen	(Denmark) Jørgen Andersen	(Faroe Islands) Gunnar Dahl-Olsen
2001	(Faroe Islands) Bogi Kristiansen	(Denmark) Anders Michaelsen	(Faroe Islands) Gunnar Dahl-Olsen
2002	(Denmark) Karsten Ellerup	(Denmark) Anders Rasmussen	(Denmark) Leon Vibholm
2003	(Denmark) Thomas Japp Hansen	(Denmark) Ivan Kristensen	(Faroe Islands) Gunnar Dahl-Olsen
2004	(Denmark) Niels Jakob Thomsen	(Faroe Islands) Gunnar Dahl-Olsen	(Denmark) Niels Bay Petersen
2005	(Iceland) Hafsteinn Ægir Geirsson	(Faroe Islands) Gunnar Dahl-Olsen	(Faroe Islands) Bogi Kristiansen
2006	(Iceland) Hafsteinn Ægir Geirsson	(Faroe Islands) Gunnar Dahl-Olsen	(Iceland) Kári Brynjólfsson
2007	(Iceland) Hafsteinn Ægir Geirsson	(Faroe Islands) Torkil Veyhe	(Iceland) Davíð Þór Sigurðsson
2008	(Iceland) Hafsteinn Ægir Geirsson	(Faroe Islands) Torkil Veyhe	(Faroe Islands) Guðmundur Joensen
2009	(Faroe Islands) Torkil Veyhe	(Faroe Islands) Guðmundur Joensen	(Iceland) Árni Már Jónsson
2010	(Faroe Islands) Torkil Veyhe	(Denmark) Kristian Gosvig	(Faroe Islands) Guðmundur Joensen
2011	(Denmark) Kristian Gosvig	(Faroe Islands) Guðmundur Joensen	(Faroe Islands) Gunnar Dahl-Olsen
2012	(Faroe Islands) Torkil Veyhe	(Faroe Islands) Guðmundur Joensen	(Faroe Islands) Gunnar Dahl-Olsen
2013	Cancelled		
2014	(Faroe Islands) Torkil Veyhe	(Faroe Islands) Helgi Winther Olsen	(Denmark) Bjarke Vodder Nielsen
2015	(Faroe Islands) Torkil Veyhe	(Faroe Islands) Guðmundur Joensen	(Denmark) Bjarke Vodder Nielsen
2016	Cancelled		
2017	(Faroe Islands) Torkil Veyhe	(Faroe Islands) Jan Hjaltalin Olsen	(Scotland) Andrew Macleod
2018	(Faroe Islands) Helgi Winther Olsen	(Faroe Islands) Dávur Magnussen	(Faroe Islands) Gunnar Dahl-Olsen
2019	Cancelled		
2020	(Faroe Islands) Helgi Winther Olsen	(Faroe Islands) Jákup Petur Eliassen	(Faroe Islands) Hilmar Hansen
2021	(Faroe Islands) Helgi Winther Olsen	(Faroe Islands) Jákup Petur Eliassen	(Faroe Islands) Hilmar Hansen
2022	(Faroe Islands) Jákup Petur Eliassen	(Faroe Islands) Hilmar Hansen	(Faroe Islands) Gunnar Dahl-Olsen
