= Kimberley Ashton =

Badminton player and cyclist

Kimberley Garrett
Personal information
- Born: 21 August 1987 (age 38) Jersey
- Height: 1.57 m (5 ft 2 in)
- Weight: 48 kg (106 lb)

Sport
- Country: Jersey
- Sport: Badminton, Cycling
Medal record
Badminton
Representing Jersey
Island Games
Gold medal – first place	2005 Shetland	Team event
Gold medal – first place	2009 Aland	Mixed doubles
Bronze medal – third place	2005 Shetland	Women's singles
Bronze medal – third place	2009 Aland	Women's doubles
Cycling
Island Games
Gold medal – first place	2011 Isle of Wight	Women's individual road race
Gold medal – first place	2015 Jersey	Women's individual road race
Gold medal – first place	2015 Jersey	Women's individual time trial
Gold medal – first place	2015 Jersey	Women's team road race
Gold medal – first place	2015 Jersey	Women's team time trial
Gold medal – first place	2015 Jersey	Women's town centre criterium
Bronze medal – third place	2011 Isle of Wight	Women's town centre criterium

Kimberley Garrett (née Ashton; born 21 August 1987), also known as Kim Garrett, is a triathlete, cyclist and former badminton player from Jersey. She represented Jersey in badminton at the 2010 Commonwealth Games and cycling at the 2018 Commonwealth Games. She has also competed at the Island Games. Kim achieved podium finishes in triathlon at the 2023 Island Games.

== Career ==
Kim originally competed in the sport of badminton. She and mixed-doubles partner Chris Cottilard were Jersey's first badminton athletes to reach a final math at the 2009 Island Games. Kim went on to compete in women's badminton singles at the 2010 Commonwealth Games in New Delhi.

Due to injuries she accumulated during her badminton career, Kim took up cycling as a hobby. Kim competed as a cyclist in the 2011 and 2015 Island Games and was Jersey's most successful athlete at the latter. Kim had planned to compete at the 2017 Island Games but withdrew due to her issues with the team selection policy. In 2018, Kim announced she would retire from sports after competing in the 2018 Gold Coast Commonwealth Games.

== Major results ==
=== Badminton ===
- 2005 - Island Games (Shetland)
  - Team event - 1st place
  - Women's singles - 3rd place
- 2009 - Island Games (Åland)
  - Mixed doubles - 1st place
  - Women's doubles - 3rd place
- 2010 - Commonwealth Games - Badminton Singles - 33rd place

=== Cycling ===
- 2011 - Island Games (Isle of Wight)
  - Women's individual road race - 1st place
  - Women's team road race - 3rd place - with Jo Le Cocq and Sue Townsend
  - Women's individual town centre criterium - 3rd place
  - Women's team town centre criterium - 3rd place - with Jo Le Cocq and Sue Townsend
- 2015 - Island Games (Jersey)
  - Women's individual road race - 1st place
  - Women's individual time trial - 1st place
  - Women's individual town centre criterium - 1st place
  - Women's team road race - 1st place - with Laura Chillingworth and Clare Treharne
  - Women's team time trial - 1st place - with Laura Chillingworth and Clare Treharne
  - Women's team town centre criterium - 1st place - with Laura Chillingworth and Clare Treharne
- 2016 - British Cycling Women's Road Series - 1st place
- 2018 - Commonwealth Games - Road Race - 20th place

=== Triathlon ===
- 2023 – Island Games (Guernsey)
  - Women's individual triathlon – Silver medal (Time: 2:19:44)
  - Women's team triathlon – Silver medal with Jersey team (Team time: 7:03:47)
