= Rúnar Örn Ágústsson =

Icelandic cyclist

Personal information
- Full name: Rúnar Örn Ágústsson
- Born: 7 July 1985 (age 41)

Cycling career
- Sport: Cycling
- Current team: Tindur
- Discipline: Road
- Role: Rider

Amateur teams
- 2017: World Cycling Centre
- 2019: Breiðablik
- 2020–: Tindur

Rúnar Örn Ágústsson (born 7 July 1985) is an Icelandic road cyclist. He competed in the time trial at the 2019 and 2021 UCI Road World Championships.

== Major results ==
2016
2nd Road race, National Road Championships
2017
2nd Time trial, National Road Championships
2018
1st Time trial, National Road Championships
2019
2nd Time trial, National Road Championships
2020
2nd Time trial, National Road Championships
2021
National Road Championships

1st Time trial
5th Road race
