= Nicole Mitchell (cyclist) =

Bermudian cyclist

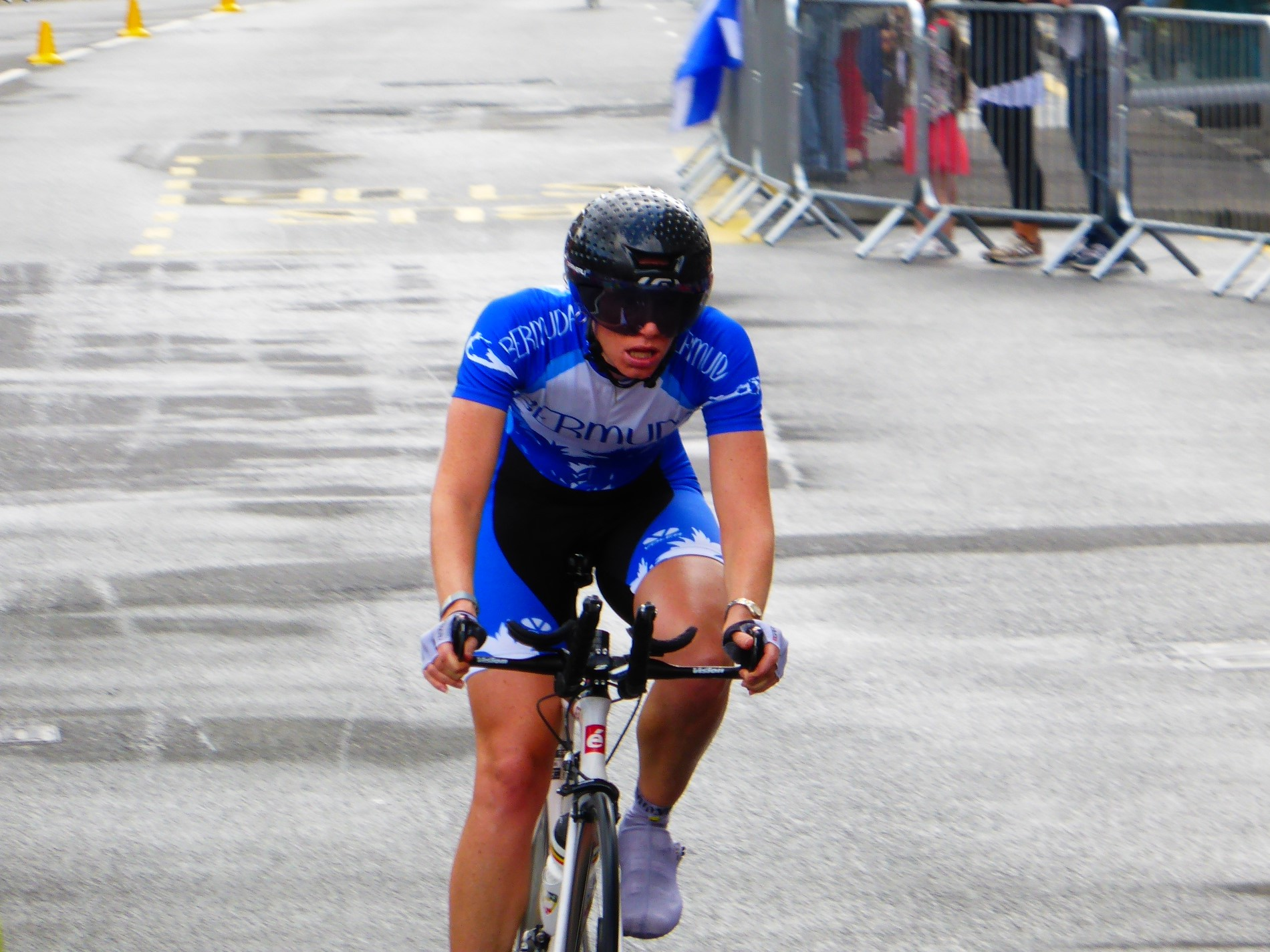
- Mitchell at the 2014 Commonwealth Games

Personal information
- Born: 11 July 1983 (age 43) Bermuda

Cycling career
- Sport: Cycling
- Discipline: Road
- Role: Rider

Nicole Mitchell (born 11 July 1983) is a Bermudian road cyclist. She won both the road race and the time trial at the Bermudan National Road Championships in 2014. She competed at the 2014 Commonwealth Games achieving a 21st position in the time trial, out of 32 riders. On April 14, 2014, she earned the silver medal at the 16th Annual Colossal Cave in Tucson, Arizona.

== Major results ==
2009
3rd Road race, National Road Championships
2010
National Road Championships

2nd Time trial
2nd Road race

2012
National Road Championships

1st Time trial
1st Road race

2013
1st Time trial, National Road Championships
2014
National Road Championships

1st Time trial
1st Road race

2015
3rd Time trial, National Road Championships
2016
National Road Championships

2nd Time trial
2nd Road race

2017
Island Games

1st Team criterium
2nd Team road race
3rd Road race

National Road Championships

1st Road race
1st Criterium
2nd Time trial

2018
National Road Championships

2nd Time trial
2nd Road race

2019
National Road Championships

2nd Time trial
2nd Road race

2021
National Road Championships

1st Time trial
2nd Road race
