= Hafsteinn Geirsson =

Icelandic sailor and cyclist

Personal information
- Full name: Hafsteinn Ægir Geirsson
- Nationality: Iceland
- Born: 4 August 1980 (age 46) Reykjavík, Iceland
- Height: 1.88 m (6 ft 2 in)
- Weight: 77 kg (170 lb)

Sailing career
- Sport: Sailing
- Club: Siglingaklúbburinn Þytur
- Class: Laser

Hafsteinn Ægir Geirsson (born 4 August 1980 in Reykjavík) is an Icelandic cyclist and retired sailor, who specialized in the Laser class. He represented his nation Iceland in two editions of the Olympic Games (2000 and 2004), and has also been training throughout most of his sporting career for Þytur Sailing Regatta (Icelandic: Siglingaklúbburinn Þytur).

Hafsteinn made his official debut at the 2000 Summer Olympics in Sydney, where he placed forty-second in the Laser class with a net grade of 355, after having decided to pull himself out in the last race due to yachting malfunction.

At the 2004 Summer Olympics in Athens, Hafsteinn qualified for his second Icelandic team, as a 24-year-old, in the Laser class by granting a tripartite invitation from the International Sailing Federation. Sailing through the race series with a similar effort from the previous Olympics, Geirsson recorded a satisfying grade of 344 net points to upgrade his position to fortieth in a fleet of forty-two sailors.

Hafsteinn is also a cyclist. He has won several Icelandic competitions and the Faroese Kring Føroyar (Tour of Faroe Islands) which he has won four times, 2005, 2006, 2007 and 2008.

== Major results ==
2005
1st Overall Tour of Faroe Islands
2006
1st Overall Tour of Faroe Islands
2007
1st Overall Tour of Faroe Islands
2008
1st Road race, National Road Championships
1st Overall Tour of Faroe Islands
2009
1st Road race, National Road Championships
2010
2nd Road race, National Road Championships
2011
1st Road race, National Road Championships
2012
3rd Road race, National Road Championships
2013
2nd Road race, National Road Championships
2014
2nd Road race, National Road Championships
2017
National Road Championships

3rd Road race
3rd Time trial

2018
2nd Road race, National Road Championships
2nd National Cyclo-Cross Championships
2019
3rd Road race, National Road Championships
2020
1st Road race, National Road Championships
2021
4th Road race, National Road Championships
2022
2nd Road race, National Road Championships
2023
3rd Road race, National Road Championships
