= Kaden Hopkins =

Bermudian cyclist

Personal information
- Full name: Kaden Luke Hopkins
- Born: 24 March 2000 (age 26) Hamilton, Bermuda
- Height: 1.77 m (5 ft 10 in)
- Weight: 67 kg (148 lb)

Cycling career
- Sport: Cycling
- Current team: Atom 6 Bikes–Cycleur de Luxe–Auto Stroo
- Discipline: Road
- Role: Rider

Amateur teams
- 2016–2020: Winners Edge
- 2021–2022: Equipo Essax
- 2023–2024: Vendée U
- 2025: Uni Sport Lamentinois

Professional team
- 2026–: Atom 6 Bikes–Cycleur de Luxe–Auto Stroo

Major wins
- One-day races and Classics National Road Race Championships (2023, 2024) National Time Trial Championships (2020, 2021, 2023, 2024) Tour Cycliste International de la Guadeloupe – points classification (2024)
Medal record
Men's road cycling
Representing Bermuda
Pan American Championships
Bronze medal – third place	2023 Panama City	Time trial
Central American and Caribbean Games
Bronze medal – third place	2023 San Salvador	Road race
Junior Pan American Games
Silver medal – second place	2021 Cali-Valle	Time trial

Kaden Hopkins (born 24 March 2000) is a Bermudian racing cyclist, who rides for the UCI Continental team Atom 6 Bikes–Cycleur de Luxe–Auto Stroo.

== Career ==
At the 2021 Junior Pan American Games in Cali, Colombia, Hopkins won silver in the men's under-23 time trial, finishing four seconds behind the winner.

In 2023, Hopkins joined the French amateur development team Vendée U. He won the opening stage of the Boucle de l'Artois and finished second overall. He also won bronze in the elite men's time trial at the Pan American Road Championships in Panama City.

In 2024, Hopkins won both the Bermuda national time trial and national road race titles and finished 4th in the Pan American Championships time trial and 6th in the road race in Brazil. At the 2024 Tour Cycliste International de la Guadeloupe, he won two stages and the points classification (green jersey). He competed at the 2024 UCI Road World Championships, finishing 32nd in the elite men's time trial in Zurich.

In October 2025, Hopkins received an upgraded bronze medal in the men's road race from the 2023 Central American and Caribbean Games following a doping disqualification of another competitor.

== Major results ==
2023
National Road Championships

1st Road race
1st Time trial

1st Stage 1, Boucle de l'Artois
2nd Overall Boucle de l'Artois
2x stage, Tour Cycliste International de la Guadeloupe
3rd Time trial, Pan American Championships
2024
National Road Championships

1st Time trial
1st Road race

2x stage, Tour Cycliste International de la Guadeloupe

1st Points classification

2nd Time trial, Caribbean Road Championships
4th Time trial, Pan American Championships
6th Road race, Pan American Championships
2025
National Road Championships

2nd Road race
3rd Time trial

1st Prologue, Tour Cycliste International de la Guadeloupe
7th Time trial, Pan American Championships
10th Road race, Pan American Championships
2026
9th Time trial, Pan American Championships
9th Road race, Pan American Championships
