= Mihkel Räim =

Estonian cyclist

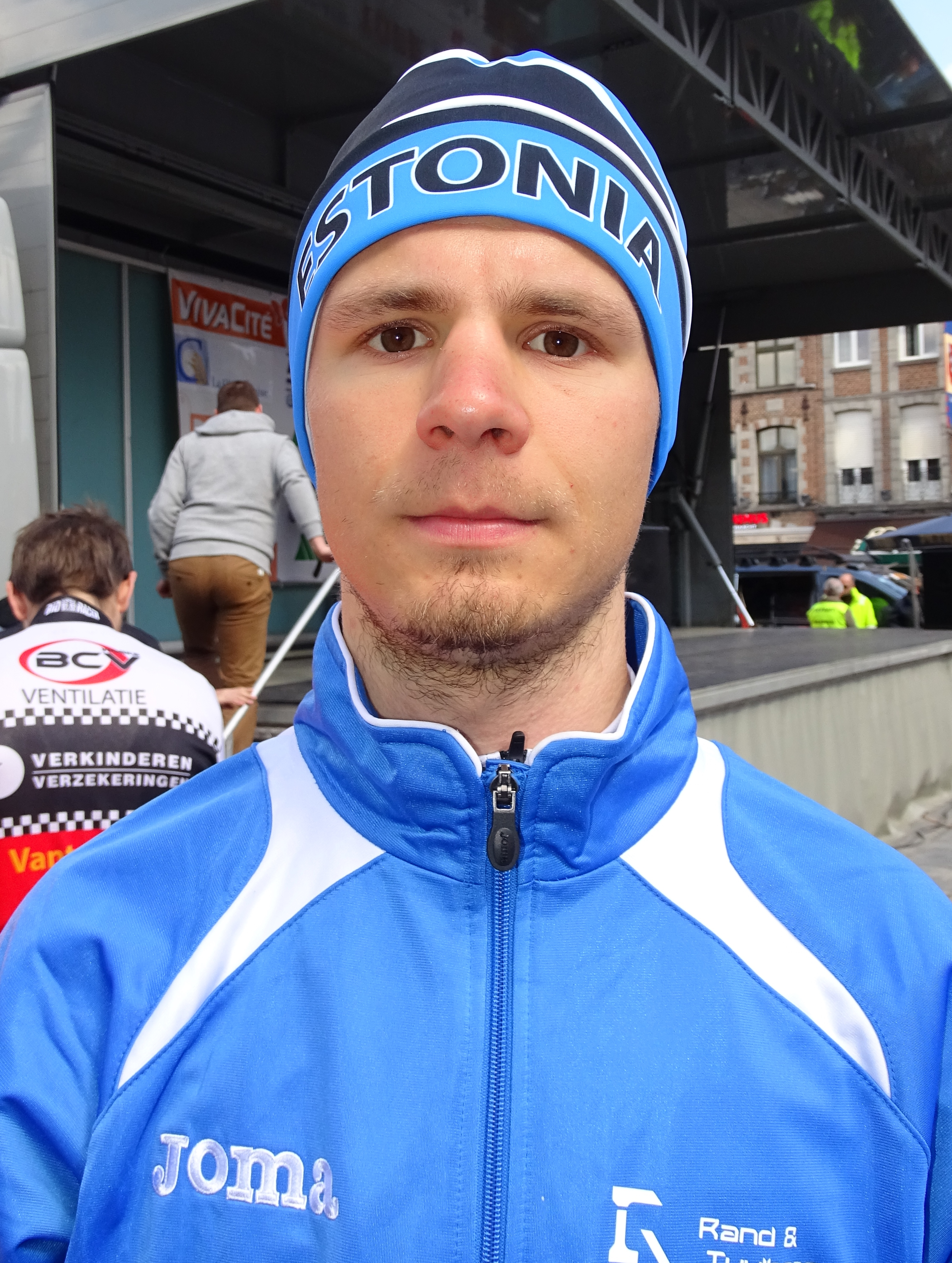
- Räim in 2015.

Personal information
- Full name: Mihkel Räim
- Nickname: Miku
- Born: 3 July 1993 (age 33) Kuressaare, Estonia
- Height: 1.76 m (5 ft 9 in)
- Weight: 70 kg (154 lb)

Cycling career
- Sport: Cycling
- Current team: Quick Pro Team
- Discipline: Road
- Role: Rider
- Rider type: Sprinting, one day races

Amateur teams
- 2010–2011: SJK Viiking
- 2012: CR4C Roanne
- 2014: EC Saint-Étienne Loire
- 2015: Pro Immo Nicolas Roux

Professional teams
- 2013: Amore & Vita
- 2014: Amore & Vita–Selle SMP (stagiaire)
- 2016–2020: Cycling Academy
- 2021: Mazowsze Serce Polski
- 2022: Burgos BH
- 2023: ATT Investments
- 2024–: Ferei Quick-Panda Podium Mongolia Team

Major wins
- One-day races and Classics National Road Race Championships (2016, 2018, 2021, 2022)

Mihkel Räim (born 3 July 1993) is an Estonian cyclist, who currently rides for Quick Pro Team. In October 2020, he was named in the startlist for the 2020 Vuelta a España. He is four time Estonian national road race champion. In his career he earned more than 15 UCI victories in different categories.

== Major results ==
2010
1st Road race, National Junior Road Championships
1st Overall Tour de la Region de Łódź

1st Stages 1, 3 & 4

2011
1st Road race, Island Games
2012
9th Jūrmala Grand Prix
2013
1st Stage 5 Baltic Chain Tour
8th Jūrmala Grand Prix
2014
7th Overall Tour of Estonia
2015
1st Road race, Island Games
Grand Prix Chantal Biya

1st Points classification
1st Stages 1 & 3

2nd Coppa dei Laghi-Trofeo Almar
6th Ronde van Vlaanderen Beloften
2016
1st Road race, National Road Championships
1st Overall Tour de Hongrie

1st Stage 1

Tour de Beauce

1st Stages 1 & 4

3rd Overall Tour of Estonia
3rd Overall Grand Prix Cycliste de Saguenay
5th GP Kranj
9th GP Adria Mobil
9th Tro-Bro Léon
2017
1st Road race, Island Games
1st Stage 1 Tour d'Azerbaïdjan
1st Stage 4 Colorado Classic
4th Overall Okolo Slovenska

1st Stage 1

5th Overall Tour of Estonia
8th Coppa Bernocchi
10th Schaal Sels
2018
1st Road race, National Road Championships
1st Great War Remembrance Race
1st Stage 2 Vuelta a Castilla y León
1st Stage 4 Tour of Japan
2nd Rund um Köln
7th Overall Tour de Korea

1st Stage 2

2019
1st Overall Tour of Estonia

1st Points classification
1st Stage 2

1st Stage 3 Tour of Romania
4th Overall Tour of Taihu Lake
4th Grand Prix de la Somme
6th Antwerp Port Epic
7th Grote Prijs Stad Zottegem
2020
1st Stage 1 Tour of Antalya
2021
1st Road race, National Road Championships
1st Overall Belgrade–Banja Luka

1st Stage 4

1st Stage 3 Istrian Spring Trophy
1st Stage 3 Tour of Bulgaria
5th Visegrad 4 Bicycle Race – GP Polski
6th Overall Baltic Chain Tour
7th GP Slovenian Istria
2022
1st Road race, National Road Championships
8th Overall Tour of Estonia
8th Overall Baltic Chain Tour
2023
6th GP Adria Mobil
7th Fyen Rundt
2024
2nd Overall Tour of Huangshan
9th Overall Tour of Lithuania

=== Grand Tour general classification results timeline ===
Grand Tour	2020
Giro d'Italia	—
Tour de France	—
Vuelta a España	139

Legend
—	Did not compete
DNF	Did not finish
