= Icelandic Cycling Union =

National governing body of cycle racing in Iceland

- Sport: Bicycle racing
- Jurisdiction: National
- Abbreviation: HRÍ
- Affiliation: UCI
- Headquarters: Reykjavík

Official website
- hri.is
- (Iceland)

The Icelandic Cycling Union or HRÍ (in Icelandic: Hjólreiðasamband Íslands) is the national governing body of cycle racing in Iceland.

The HRÍ was created in June 2014. It was granted provisional membership by the UCI Management Committee in June 2015 and admitted as a full member at the UCI Congress in September 2015.) The HRÍ is also a member of the UEC.

The most important competition organized by the HRÍ are the Icelandic National Road Championships.
