= Beth McCluskey =

Irish mountain bike racer

Personal information
- Born: Ireland
- Height: 164 cm (5 ft 5 in)
- Weight: 50 kg (110 lb)

Cycling career
- Sport: Cycling
- Discipline: Mountain bike racing
- Role: Rider
- Rider type: Cross-country cycling

Major wins
- Irish champion in cross-country cycling cyclocross

Beth McCluskey is an Irish mountain bike racer, cyclocross racer, road racer, mountain runner and adventure racer.

== Titles ==
2007 2009
(Republic of Ireland) Irish champion in Olympic format cross-country cycling

2016 and 2017 Irish champion in cyclocross racing
