= Jeremy Martin =

Canadian cyclist

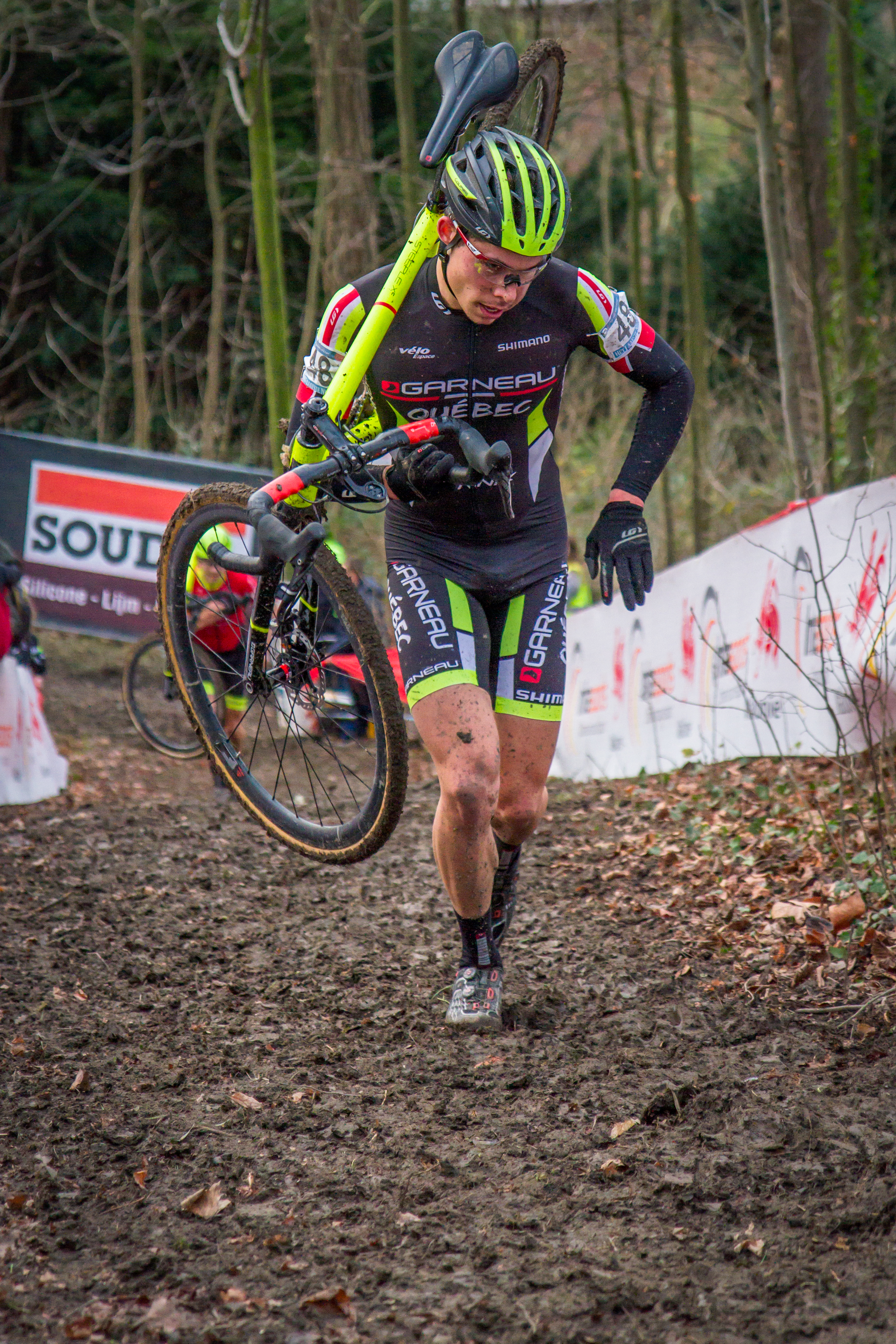

Personal information
- Born: 25 May 1992 (age 34) Toronto, Ontario, Canada

Cycling career
- Sport: Cycling
- Disciplines: Cyclo-cross mountain bike
- Role: Rider

Jeremy Martin (born 25 May 1992) is a Canadian male mountainbiker and cyclo-cross cyclist. He represented his nation on the mountainbike in the men's cross country event at the 2010 UCI Mountain Bike & Trials World Championships and in cyclo-croos in the men's elite event at the 2016 UCI Cyclo-cross World Championships in Heusden-Zolder.
