= Dominique Mayho =

Bermudian cyclist

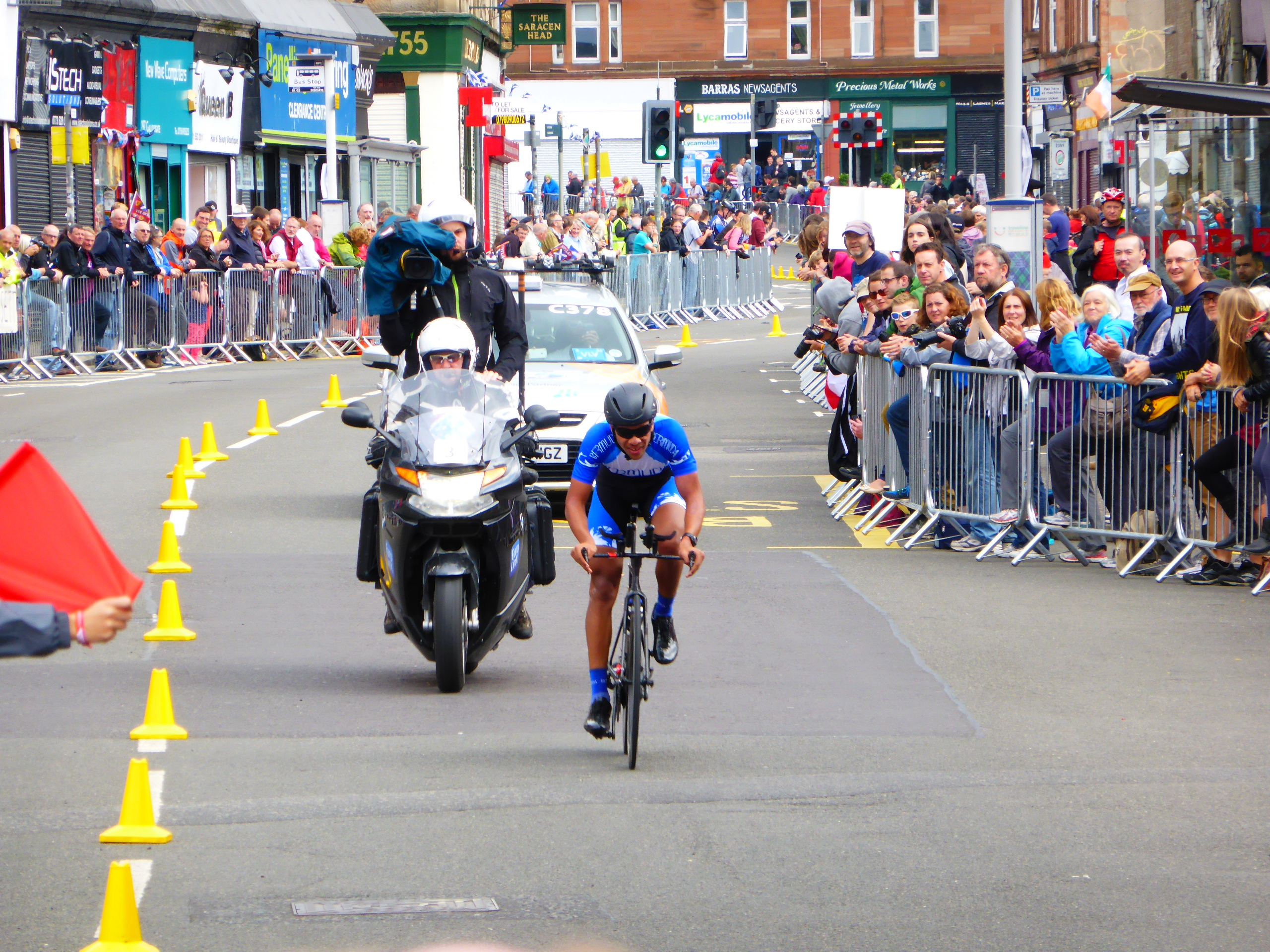
- Mayho at the 2014 Commonwealth Games

Personal information
- Full name: Dominique Sidney Mayho
- Born: 29 November 1993 (age 32) Hamilton, Bermuda

Cycling career
- Sport: Cycling
- Discipline: Road
- Role: Rider

Amateur teams
- 2015: Ride with Rendall p/b Blemme
- 2016: Jonge Rakkers Vollezele
- 2017–2018: Asfra Racing Oudenaarde
- 2019: VT Construction–Madison
- 2020: Landis Trek Team
- 2023–2024: VT Construction

Dominique Sidney Mayho (born 29 November 1993) is a Bermudian cyclist, who most recently rode for Bermudian amateur team VT Construction.

== Major results ==
2012
National Road Championships

1st Road race
1st Time trial

2013
1st Road race, National Road Championships
2015
1st Criterium, Island Games
1st Road race, National Road Championships
2016
1st Road race, National Road Championships
2017
National Road Championships

1st Road race
1st Time trial

2018
National Road Championships

1st Road race
2nd Time trial

2019
1st Road race, National Road Championships
2021
1st Road race, National Road Championships
