= Torkil Veyhe =

Faroese road racing cyclist

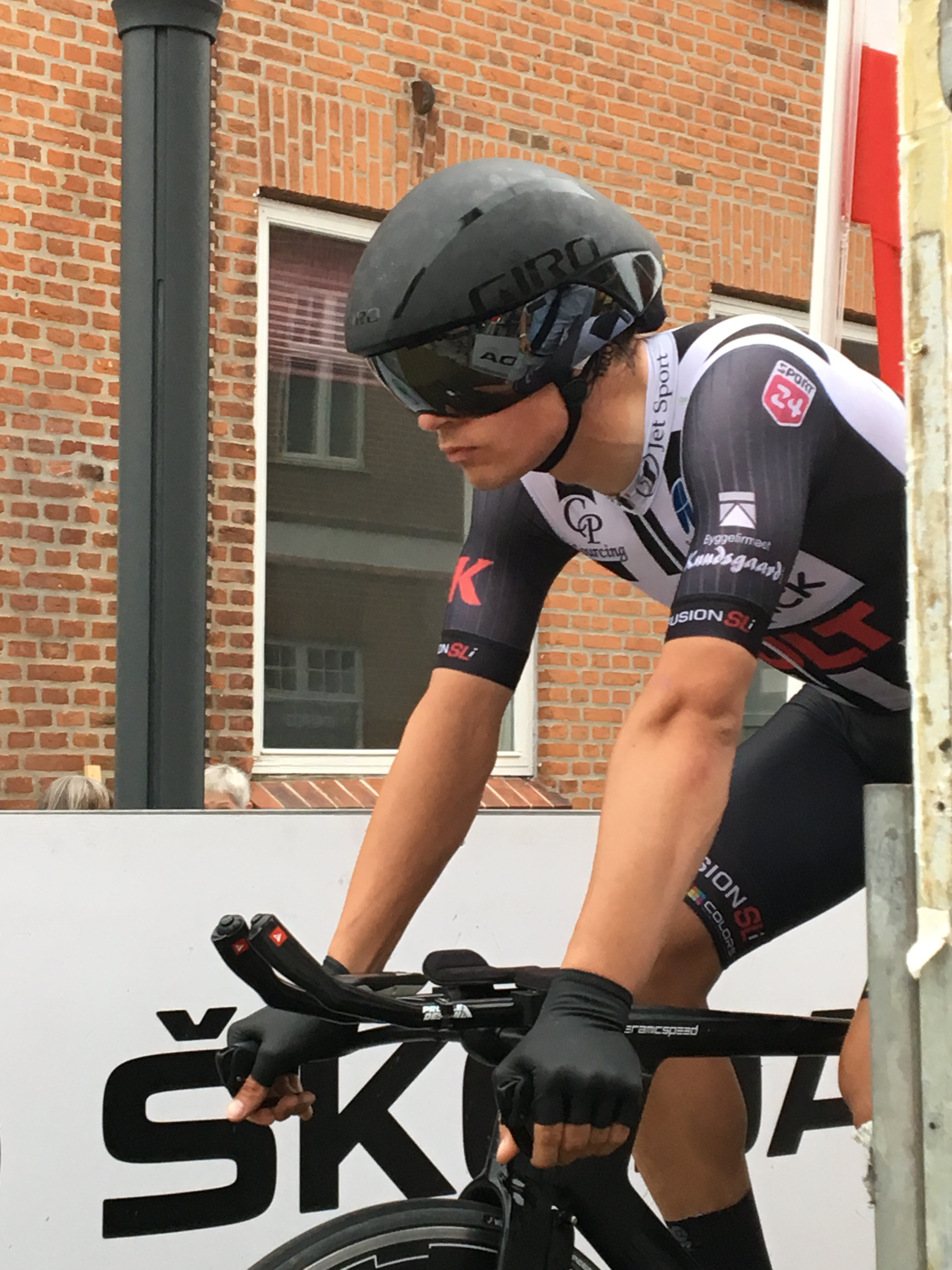
- Torkil Veyhe in 2017

Personal information
- Full name: Torkil Eyðfinsson Veyhe
- Born: 9 January 1990 (age 36) Tórshavn, Faroe Islands
- Height: 186 cm (6 ft 1 in)
- Weight: 80 kg (180 lb)

Cycling career
- Sport: Cycling
- Current team: Retired
- Discipline: Road
- Role: Rider

Amateur teams
- 2007–2012: Tórshavnar Súkklufelag
- 2012–2015: Odder Cykel Klub
- 2015–2016: Team WeBike-CK Aarhus

Professional teams
- 2017: Team ColoQuick–Cult
- 2018: Team Virtu Cycling
- 2019–2020: Riwal Readynez
Medal record
Representing Faroe Islands
Island Games
| Gold medal – first place | 2017 Gotland | Time trial |
| Gold medal – first place | 2015 Jersey | Time trial |
| Silver medal – second place | 2017 Gotland | Town Center Criterium |
| Silver medal – second place | 2013 Bermuda | Time trial |
| Silver medal – second place | 2013 Bermuda | Road race |
| Silver medal – second place | 2009 Åland Islands | Team |
| Bronze medal – third place | 2015 Jersey | Road race |
| Bronze medal – third place | 2015 Jersey | Team |

Torkil Eyðfinsson Veyhe (born 9 January 1990) is a Faroese former professional road bicycle racer, who rode professionally between 2017 and 2020 for Team ColoQuick–Cult, Team Waoo and Riwal Securitas. He also rode for the national cycling team of the Faroe Islands at the Island Games, winning two gold medals, four silver medals and two bronze medals. In 2016 he rode for the Danish national team at the Danmark Rundt and in 2017 at the European Road Championships in the men's road race. Earlier he rode for the DCU team Team WeBike–CK Aarhus, the Danish club Odder Cykel Klub and the Faroese club Tórshavnar Súkklufelag. In 2016 he won his first A-race in Denmark and his first UCI points.

== Background and education ==
Torkil Veyhe comes from the Faroe Islands, from the capital Tórshavn. He started as a cyclist there and soon became a multiple Faroese Champion as well as multiple winner of Tour of Faroe Islands (Kring Føroyar) road race. After finishing the Higher Commercial Examination Programme (HHX) in Tórshavn in 2010, Veyhe moved to Aarhus in Denmark to study for Engineer and to compete in Danish cycling competitions. First he took one year of preparation for the education he wanted to study, and the following year he started the education. He took the Bachelor of Engineering (B.E.) in Structural Engineering from the Aarhus University School of Engineering in 2014. The same year he continued to study for the Master of Science in Engineering degree which he finished in 2016. Veyhe defended his MS final thesis on the day after competing at the Danish Championships time trial, where he was number 9, and two days after the exam he competed at the Danish Championships road race, hitting an early break out together with three other cyclists Chris Anker Sørensen, Michael Reihs, and Mark Sehested Pedersen. After the Danish Championships he was elected for the Danish national team.

== Career as a cyclist ==
He has won competitions like Island Games in 2015 and Kring Føroyar in 2009, 2010, 2012, 2014, 2015 and 2017. He was Faroese champion in the time trial and in road race 2009. Veyhe competed at several events at the 2007 Island Games in Rhodes.

Torkil Veyhe moved to live in Denmark to study and at the same time he continued to cycle on a high level. The first years in Denmark, he competed in lower class, but soon he won a 124-km race in Hjørring for license cyclists in the B class. After competing in five races in Denmark in 2013 he was promoted to the A class. Veyhe competed at the 2013 Island Games in Bermuda where he took two silver medals. In June 2015 he took bronze in the Nishiki Løbet 2015 (Nishiki Race 2015) in Randers. Veyhe won the first Faroese gold medal at the 2015 Island Games, when he took gold in the men's individual time trial on 28 June 2015. He also won bronze in the men's road race at the 2015 Island Games.

On 15 October 2015 Veyhe got a two-year agreement with Tryggingarfelagið Føroyar (a Faroese insurance company), which will support him financially until October 2017.

After joining Team We-Bike CK Aarhus in November 2015 he sat two goals for 2016, he would win an A-race and he would win his first UCI points. In April and May 2016 both goals were achieved, he won his first 3 UCI points when finishing as number eight at the Himmerland Rundt UCI category 1.2 on 29 April 2016 and two weeks later he won the A-race JE.DK in Herning. After the Danish Championships in June 2016 he was elected to ride for the Danish national team at the Danmark Rundt, along with teammate Niklas Pedersen. At the third stage he won the combativity award.

In 2017, Veyhe was the winner of the Faroese National Road Race Championships in front of Helgi W. Olsen and Jan Hjaltalin. He also won the 10-kilometre (6.2-mile) time trial by more than three minutes, and the criterium.

== Major results ==
2007
Island Games

2nd Team road race
8th Time trial

2009
2nd Team road race, Island Games (with Eli Christiansen, Gunnar Dahl-Olsen, Bogi Kristiansen & Sigmund Olsson)
2013
Island Games

2nd Time trial
2nd Road race

2015
Island Games

1st Time trial
3rd Road race
3rd Team time trial

2016
1st JE.DK Løbet Herning
1st Pinsecuppen
2nd Sønderborg-Post Cup
2nd Designa løbet
2nd Post Cup
4th Hjørring-Sparekassen Vendsyssel
5th Grenaa CC
8th Himmerland Rundt
8th Kolding BC
9th Time trial, Danish National Road Championships
9th GP Horsens Posten
Combativity award, Stage 3 Danmark Rundt
2017
Island Games

1st Time trial
2nd Criterium
3rd Team road race
3rd Team time trial
5th Road race

Faroese National Championships

1st Road race
1st Time trial
1st Criterium

1st DCU-A Rødekro
3rd GP Horsens
3rd Skive-Løbet
5th Fyen Rundt
6th Overall Danmark Rundt
6th GP Herning
7th Edlund Løbet
8th Overall Ronde van Midden-Nederland
10th Time trial, Danish National Road Championships
Tour des Fjords

Most active rider, Stages 1 & 4
