= Martin Loo =

Estonian cross-country mountain biker (born 1988)

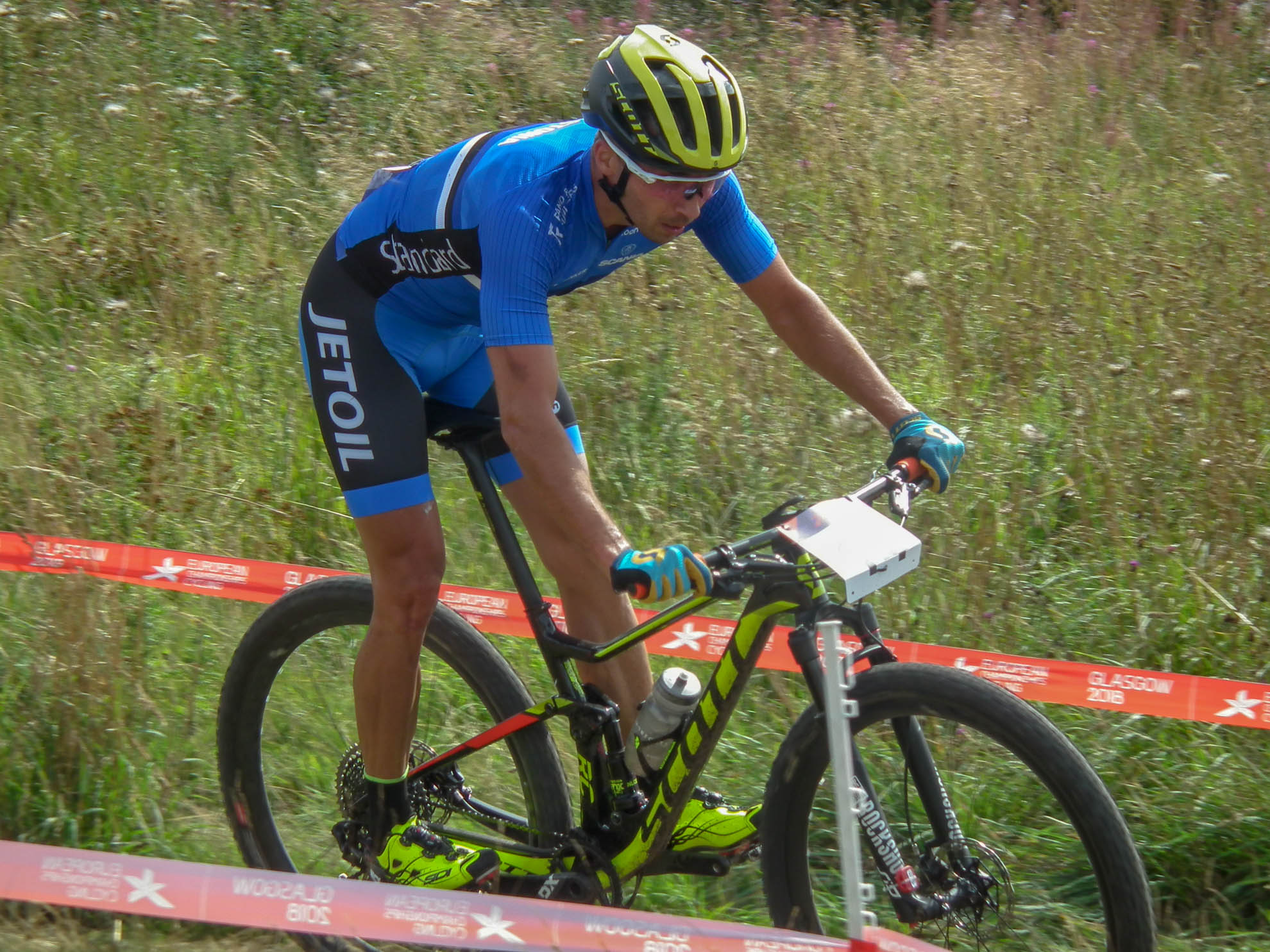
- Martin Loo in 2018

Personal information
- Born: 9 April 1988 (age 38)
- Height: 1.78 m (5 ft 10 in)
- Weight: 70 kg (154 lb)

Cycling career
- Sport: Cycling
- Disciplines: Cross-country, Cyclo-cross
- Role: Rider

Professional teams
- 2008: Merida Biking Team
- 2010–2011: Infotre–LeeCougan
- 2012: HardRock–Canossa
- 2013: Merida Italia Team

Martin Loo (born 9 April 1988) is an Estonian cross-country mountain biker. He also competes in cyclo-cross.

== Major results ==
2007
1st National Cross-country Championships
2012
1st National Cross-country Championships
2013
1st National Cross-country Championships
2014
1st National Cross-country Championships
2015
1st National Cyclo-cross Championships
2016
1st National Cyclo-cross Championships
2017
1st National Cross-country Marathon Championships
1st National Cyclo-cross Championships
2018
1st National Cyclo-cross Championships
