= Gunnar Dahl-Olsen =

Faroese cyclist

Personal information
- Born: 12 January 1965 (age 61)

Cycling career
- Sport: Cycling
- Discipline: Road
- Role: Rider

Gunnar Dahl-Olsen (born 12 January 1965) is a Faroese road cyclist, who is a multiple time national road and time trial champion.

== Major results ==
1992
2nd National Time Trial Championships
1995
2nd Road race, Island Games
1996
3rd National Road Race Championships
3rd National Time Trial Championships
1997
3rd National Road Race Championships
3rd Overall Tour of Faroe Islands

1st Stage 4

1998
2nd National Road Race Championships
2nd National Time Trial Championships
2nd Overall Tour of Faroe Islands

1st Stage 1

1999
2nd National Road Race Championships
2nd National Time Trial Championships
2000
1st National Road Race Championships
3rd National Time Trial Championships
3rd Overall Tour of Faroe Islands

1st Stage 4

2001
1st National Road Race Championships
1st National Time Trial Championships
3rd Overall Tour of Faroe Islands
2002
1st National Road Race Championships
1st National Time Trial Championships
2003
1st National Road Race Championships
1st National Time Trial Championships
3rd Road race, Island Games
3rd Overall Tour of Faroe Islands

1st Stage 3

2004
1st National Road Race Championships
1st National Time Trial Championships
2nd Overall Tour of Faroe Islands

1st Stage 1

2005
1st National Road Race Championships
1st National Time Trial Championships
2nd Overall Tour of Faroe Islands

1st Prologue & Stage 2

2006
2nd Overall Tour of Faroe Islands

1st Stage 4

2008
1st National Road Race Championships
3rd National Time Trial Championships
2009
2nd National Road Race Championships
2nd National Time Trial Championships
2010
1st Stage 4 Tour of Faroe Islands
2011
1st National Time Trial Championships
3rd Overall Tour of Faroe Islands

1st Stage 4

2012
2nd National Road Race Championships
2nd National Time Trial Championships
3rd Overall Tour of Faroe Islands
2013
1st National Road Race Championships
2nd National Time Trial Championships
2014
1st National Road Race Championships
1st National Time Trial Championships
2015
2nd National Road Race Championships
2nd National Time Trial Championships
2016
1st National Road Race Championships
1st National Time Trial Championships
2017
3rd National Time Trial Championships
