= Ingvar Ómarsson =

Icelandic cyclist (born 1989)

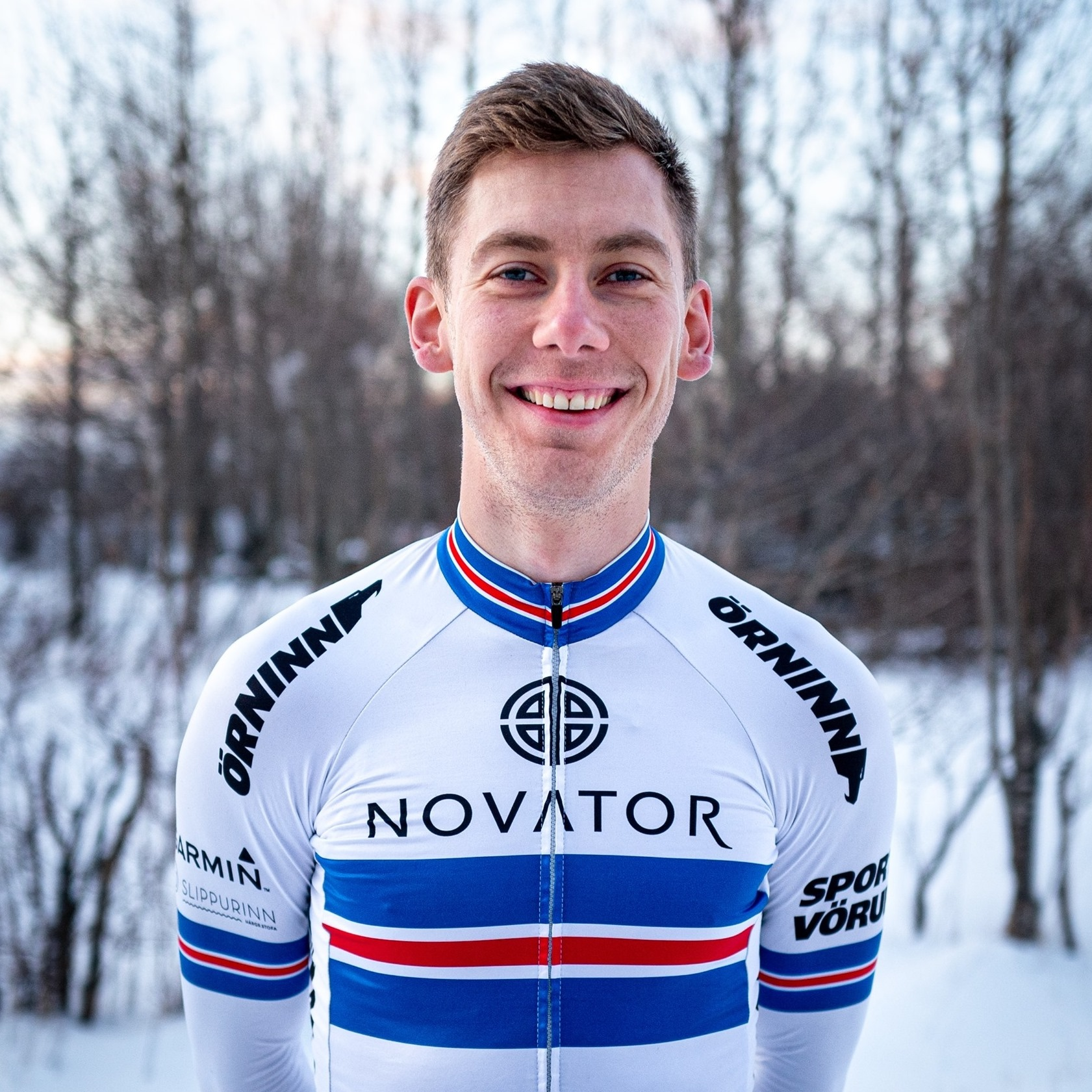
- Ingvar Ómarsson (2021)

Personal information
- Full name: Ingvar Ómarsson
- Born: 13 April 1989 (age 37) Reykjavík, Iceland
- Height: 179 cm (5 ft 10 in)
- Weight: 68 kg (150 lb)

Cycling career
- Sport: Cycling
- Current team: Novator–Örninn; Breiðablik
- Disciplines: Road; Cyclo-cross; Mountain biking; Gravel
- Role: Rider

Amateur teams
- 2011–2014: Kria Racing
- 2018–: Breiðablik

Professional teams
- 2015–2018: Novator–Kria
- 2019–: Novator–Örninn

Major wins
- One-Day Races and Classics National Cross Country Marathon Championships (2016-2022) National Road Race Championships (2013–2015, 2018, 2021-2022) National Time Trial Championships (2019-2020, 2022) National Cross Country Championships (2012, 2014–2022) National Cyclo-cross Championship (2015, 2016, 2018-2022) National Criterium Championship (2022)

Ingvar Ómarsson (born 13 April 1989) is an Icelandic professional racing cyclist. He is a multiple national champion in road cycling, cross country mountain biking, and cyclocross.

He was the first Icelandic native to become a full-time professional cyclist, he was also the first person to finish a mountain biking World Championship race for Iceland. In 2022 he was the first Icelander to finish a major road race championship in the Elite category, at the European Championships in Munchen. He specializes in cross-country mountain biking, and races both olympic cross-country (XCO) and marathon cross-country (XCM).

Ingvar was voted the Icelandic Cyclist of The Year for eight consecutive years from 2014 to 2021.

== Major results ==
=== Road ===
2013
1st Road race, National Championships
1st Vesturgatan
1st Nesjavellir Hill Climb
2nd Reykjarnes Tournament
3rd Alvogen Midnight Time Trial
2014
National Championships

1st Road race
3rd Time trial

1st Vesturgatan
2nd Overall Landskeppni

1st Prologue & Stage 2

2nd Krýsuvik Time Trial
2nd Jökulmílan
2015
1st Road race, National Championships
1st Jökulmílan
2017
5th Road race, National Championships
2018
National Championships

1st Road race
2nd Time trial

1st Reykjarnes Tournament
2nd Tour of Reykjavík
2019
National Road Championships

1st Time trial
2nd Road race

2020
1st Time trial, National Championships
2021
National Championships

1st Road race
2nd Time trial

2022
National Championships

1st Road race
1st Time trial
1st Criterium

2023
National Championships

1st Road race
1st Time trial

=== Mountain bike ===
2012
1st Cross-country, National Championships
2013
2nd Cross-country, National Championships
2014
1st Cross-country, National Championships
1st Sea Otter Classic XCO
2015
1st Cross-country, National Championships
2016
National Championships

1st Cross-country
1st Cross-country marathon

2017
National Championships

1st Cross-country
1st Cross-country marathon

2018
National Championships

1st Cross-country
1st Cross-country marathon

1st FitnessDK Marathon Slagelse
2019
National Championships

1st Cross-country
1st Cross-country marathon

2020
National Championships

1st Cross-country
1st Cross-country marathon

2021
National Championships

1st Cross-country
1st Cross-country marathon

2022
National Championships

1st Cross-country
1st Cross-country marathon

=== Cyclo-cross ===
2015–2016
1st National Championships
2016–2017
1st National Championships
2017–2018
2nd National Championships
2018–2019
1st National Championships
2021–2022
1st National Championships
2022–2023
1st National Championships

=== Gravel ===
2012
3rd Blue Lagoon Challenge
2013
3rd Blue Lagoon Challenge
2014
2nd Blue Lagoon Challenge
2015
2nd Blue Lagoon Challenge
2016
3rd Blue Lagoon Challenge
2018
1st Blue Lagoon Challenge
2019
1st Blue Lagoon Challenge
3rd The Rift
2021
2nd The Rift
2nd Blue Lagoon Challenge
2022
1st Blue Lagoon Challenge
4th The Rift
